= 1978–79 Bristol City F.C. season =

Bristol City
1978–79 season
- Manager: Alan Dicks
- Stadium: Ashton Gate
- First Division: 13th
- FA Cup: Fourth round
- League Cup: Second round

During the 1978–79 English football season, Bristol City competed in the Football League First Division.

== Season summary ==
Bristol City comfortably avoided relegation, finishing 13th in the First Division.

Pos	Team	Pld	W	D	L	GF	GA	GD	Pts	Qualification or relegation
1	Liverpool (C)	42	30	8	4	85	16	+69	68	Qualification for the European Cup first round (Note: Nottingham Forest qualified for the European Cup first round as the 1978–79 European Cup winners.)
2	Nottingham Forest	42	21	18	3	61	26	+35	60	Qualification for the European Cup first round
3	West Bromwich Albion	42	24	11	7	72	35	+37	59	Qualification for the UEFA Cup first round
4	Everton	42	17	17	8	52	40	+12	51	Qualification for the UEFA Cup first round
5	Leeds United	42	18	14	10	70	52	+18	50	Qualification for the UEFA Cup first round
6	Ipswich Town	42	20	9	13	63	49	+14	49	Qualification for the UEFA Cup first round
7	Arsenal	42	17	14	11	61	48	+13	48	Qualification for the European Cup Winners' Cup first round (Note: Arsenal qualified for the European Cup Winners' Cup first round as the 1978–79 FA Cup winners.)
8	Aston Villa	42	15	16	11	59	49	+10	46	
9	Manchester United	42	15	15	12	60	63	−3	45	
10	Coventry City	42	14	16	12	58	68	−10	44	
11	Tottenham Hotspur	42	13	15	14	48	61	−13	41	
12	Middlesbrough	42	15	10	17	57	50	+7	40	
13	Bristol City	42	15	10	17	47	51	−4	40	
14	Southampton	42	12	16	14	47	53	−6	40	
15	Manchester City	42	13	13	16	58	56	+2	39	
16	Norwich City	42	7	23	12	51	57	−6	37	
17	Bolton Wanderers	42	12	11	19	54	75	−21	35	
18	Wolverhampton Wanderers	42	13	8	21	44	68	−24	34	
19	Derby County	42	10	11	21	44	71	−27	31	
20	Queens Park Rangers (R)	42	6	13	23	45	73	−28	25	Relegation to the Second Division
21	Birmingham City (R)	42	6	10	26	37	64	−27	22	Relegation to the Second Division
22	Chelsea (R)	42	5	10	27	44	92	−48	20	Relegation to the Second Division

Source: World Football
Rules for classification: 1) Points; 2) Goal difference; 3) Goals scored
(C) Champions; (R) Relegated

== Kit ==
Bristol City's kit was produced by Umbro.

== First-team squad ==
Note: Flags indicate national team as defined under FIFA eligibility rules; some limited exceptions apply. Players may hold more than one non-FIFA nationality.

Pos.	Nation	Player
GK	SCO	John Shaw
DF	SCO	Gerry Sweeney
DF	SCO	Donnie Gillies
MF	SCO	Gerry Gow
DF	ENG	David Rodgers
DF	ENG	Norman Hunter
MF	ENG	Trevor Tainton
FW	SCO	Tom Ritchie
FW	ENG	Joe Royle
FW	ENG	Kevin Mabbutt
MF	ENG	Clive Whitehead

Pos.	Nation	Player
MF	ENG	Jimmy Mann
MF	SCO	Peter Cormack
DF	ENG	Terry Cooper
DF	ENG	Gary Collier
MF	NED	Geert Meijer
FW	ENG	Chris Garland
MF	ENG	John Bain
GK	ENG	Ray Cashley
MF	WAL	Howard Pritchard
MF	FIN	Pertti Jantunen

== Awards ==
At the end of season, Gerry Gow was given the club's Player of the Season award.
