= List of Bristol City F.C. seasons =

Bristol City League Performances

Bristol City Football Club is an English association football club based in the city of Bristol. Founded in 1894 as Bristol South End, the team first entered the FA Cup in 1895–96, and played in the Western League in 1896–97. The club then turned professional, changed its name to Bristol City, and joined the Southern League. In 1900, City merged with another Southern League club, Bedminster, and the following season gained admission to the Football League, in which the first team have played ever since. They won the Second Division title in 1905–06, and followed up with a runners-up finish in the 1906–07 First Division, three points behind champions Newcastle United. That remains the club's best Football League placing, and two years later they set another record in the 1908–09 FA Cup. City entered the competition at the first-round stage and despite needing a replay in every round apart from the third, went on to reach the final, in which they lost 1–0 to league champions Manchester United. After five seasons in the top flight, City were relegated back to the second tier.

Between the wars, they regularly moved between the second and third tiers, collecting two Third Division South titles in 1922–23 and 1926–27. In the 1930s, they entered the Welsh Cup, and beat another English club, Tranmere Rovers, after a replay to win the 1934 final. When competitive football resumed after the Second World War, City continued to yo-yo between the divisions until 1976, when they returned to the First Division for another four seasons. Financial problems multiplied as the team suffered successive relegations, and the club was on the verge of failure when eight senior players – dubbed the Ashton Gate Eight after the name of City's stadium – agreed to cancel their lengthy contracts. Although the team were again relegated at the end of the 1981–82 season, taking them into the Fourth Division for the first time in their history as well as setting an unwanted record of three consecutive Football League relegations, the club was able to continue in business.

City spent only two seasons in the fourth tier. In 1988–89 they made their second appearance in the semi-final of the League Cup – the first came in 1970–71 – and they returned to the second tier in 1990. In the next 25 years, they experienced three relegations and three promotions between second and third tiers. While in the third tier, they won the Football League Trophy – a competition for teams in the lower divisions of the Football League – three times, in 1986, 2003 and 2015, as well as reaching the final twice more.

As of the end of the 2025–26 season, Bristol City have spent 2 seasons in the fourth tier of the English football league system, 45 in the third, 58 in the second and 9 in the top tier. The table details the team's achievements and the top goalscorer in senior first-team competitions from their first season in the FA Cup in 1895–96 to the end of the most recently completed season.

== Key ==
Key to league record:

- Pld – Matches played
- W – Matches won
- D – Matches drawn
- L – Matches lost
- GF – Goals for
- GA – Goals against
- Pts – Points
- Pos – Final position

Key to colours and symbols:
Symbol	Meaning
1st or W	Winners
2nd or F	Runners-up
↑	Promoted
↓	Relegated
♦	Top league scorer in Bristol City's division

Key to divisions:

- West 1 – Western League First Division
- West P – Western League Professional Section
- South – Southern League First Division
- United – United League (Note: This United League was established in 1896, to be played as a supplementary competition to fill vacant dates in the season without the trouble and expense of arranging friendly matches. Its inaugural season involved eight teams from an area stretching from London to Leicestershire. Bristol City finished fifth in the 11-team league in the 1898–99 season, but the directors reported that "some of the United League matches failed to prove sufficiently attractive to make them a success financially", so they did not participate again.)
- Div 1 – Football League First Division
- Div 2 – Football League Second Division
- Div 3 – Football League Third Division
- Div 3S – Football League Third Division South
- Div 4 – Football League Fourth Division
- Champ – Football League Championship, EFL Championship
- League 1 – Football League One
- League 2 – Football League Two

Key to rounds:

- Group – Group stage
- Int'l – International group stage
- Prelim – Preliminary round
- QR1 – First qualifying round
- QR2 – Second qualifying round, etc.
- Inter – Intermediate round (between qualifying rounds and rounds proper)
- R1 – First round
- R2 – Second round, etc.
- QF – Quarter-final
- SF – Semi-final
- F – Final
- W – Winners
- (S) – Southern section of regionalised stage

Details of the abandoned 1939–40 Football League season are shown in italics and appropriately footnoted.

== Seasons ==
Season	League									FA Cup (Note: Beginning with the 1925–26 season, the FA Cup was structured so that the third round proper contained 64 teams. Prior to that date, the structure had varied, so rounds are not directly comparable to the round of the same name after 1925. For example, in 1895–96, when Bristol South End first entered the competition, there were only three rounds proper before the semifinal, as compared with the current six.)	League Cup	Other		Top league scorer(s)	
Season	Division (Note: Divisions are sorted according to their level within the English football league system at the time.)	Pld	W	D	L	GF	GA	Pts	Pos (Note: In seasons when the club played in more than one league, the column is sorted on the Southern League position.)	FA Cup	League Cup	Competition	Result	Player(s)	Goals
1895–96	—	—	—	—	—	—	—	—	—	QR1	—	—	—	—	—
1896–97	West 1	16	11	0	5	28	22	22	2nd	QR1	—	—	—	Not known	—
1897–98	South; West P	22; 14	13; 11	7; 1	2; 2	67; 51	33; 16	33; 23	2nd; 1st	QR3	—	—	—	Not known	—
1898–99	South; United	24; 20	15; 11	3; 0	6; 9	55; 43	33; 31	33; 22	2nd; 5th	R1	—	—	—	Not known	—
1899–1900	South; West 1	28; 6	9; 2	7; 0	12; 4	43; 12	47; 12	25; 4	9th; 4th	R2	—	—	—	Not known	—
1900–01	South; West 1	28; 16	17; 6	5; 4	6; 6	54; 25	27; 26	39; 16	2nd; 5th	Inter	—	—	—	Not known	—
1901–02	Div 2	34	17	6	11	52	35	40	6th	QR4	—	—	—	Bertie Banks	9
1902–03	Div 2	34	17	8	9	59	38	42	4th	R2	—	—	—	Dick Wombwell	11
1903–04	Div 2	34	18	6	10	73	41	42	4th	R1	—	—	—	Alf Dean	14
1904–05	Div 2	34	19	4	11	66	45	42	4th	R2	—	—	—	Sam Gilligan	14
1905–06	Div 2 ↑	38	30	6	2	83	28	66	1st	R1	—	—	—	William Maxwell	27 ♦
1906–07	Div 1	38	20	8	10	66	47	48	2nd (Note: Runners-up in the First Division straight after promotion as Second Division champions. Remains their highest league finish.)	R2	—	—	—	William Maxwell	17
1907–08	Div 1	38	12	12	14	58	61	36	10th	R1	—	—	—	Sam Gilligan	16
1908–09	Div 1	38	13	12	13	45	58	38	8th	F (Note: After needing a replay in every round but the third, Bristol City reached the 1909 FA Cup Final, in which they lost 1–0 to Manchester United.)	—	—	—	Sam Gilligan	9
1909–10	Div 1	38	12	8	18	45	60	32	16th	R2	—	—	—	Jack Cowell	20
1910–11	Div 1 ↓	38	11	5	22	43	66	27	19th	R1	—	—	—	Ginger Owers	16
1911–12	Div 2	38	14	6	18	41	60	34	13th	R1	—	—	—	Jock Butler	11
1912–13	Div 2	38	9	15	14	46	72	33	16th	R1	—	—	—	Ginger Owers	13
1913–14	Div 2	38	16	9	13	52	50	41	8th	R1	—	—	—	Billy Brown	10
1914–15	Div 2	38	15	7	16	62	56	37	13th	R1	—	—	—	Billy Brown	13
1915–19	League and FA Cup football was suspended until after the First World War.														
1919–20	Div 2	42	13	17	12	46	43	43	8th	SF	—	—	—	Tommy Howarth	14
1920–21	Div 2	42	19	13	10	49	29	51	3rd	R1	—	—	—	Bill Pocock; Jonah Wilcox	14
1921–22	Div 2 ↓	42	12	9	21	37	58	33	22nd	R1	—	—	—	Albert Fairclough	12
1922–23	Div 3S ↑	42	24	11	7	66	40	59	1st	R2	—	—	—	Albert Fairclough	19
1923–24	Div 2 ↓	42	7	15	20	32	65	29	22nd	R3	—	—	—	Albert Fairclough	8
1924–25	Div 3S	42	22	9	11	60	41	53	3rd	R2	—	—	—	Tot Walsh	20
1925–26	Div 3S	42	21	9	12	72	51	51	4th	R3	—	—	—	Tot Walsh	25
1926–27	Div 3S ↑	42	27	8	7	104	54	60	1st	R2	—	—	—	Tot Walsh	32
1927–28	Div 2	42	15	9	18	76	79	39	12th	R3	—	—	—	Albert Keating	16
1928–29	Div 2	42	13	10	19	58	72	36	20th	R3	—	—	—	Cecil Blakemore; Percy Vials	13
1929–30	Div 2	42	13	9	20	61	83	35	20th	R3	—	—	—	Bertie Williams	16
1930–31	Div 2	42	15	8	19	54	82	38	16th	R3	—	—	—	Sid Elliott	15
1931–32	Div 2 ↓	42	6	11	25	39	78	23	22nd	R4	—	—	—	Charlie Sargeant	10
1932–33	Div 3S	42	12	13	17	83	90	37	15th	R2	—	Welsh Cup	R7	Ted Bowen	28
1933–34	Div 3S	42	10	13	19	58	85	33	19th	R3	—	Welsh Cup; Third Division South Cup	W; R1	Joe Riley	13
1934–35	Div 3S	42	15	9	18	52	68	39	15th	R5	—	Third Division South Cup	R2	Ted Harston	15
1935–36	Div 3S	42	15	10	17	48	59	40	13th	R1	—	Welsh Cup; Third Division South Cup	R6; R2	Dick Armstrong	11
1936–37	Div 3S	42	15	6	21	58	70	36	16th	R1	—	Welsh Cup; Third Division South Cup	R6; R1	Jack Haycox	17
1937–38	Div 3S	42	21	13	8	68	40	55	2nd	R2	—	Welsh Cup; Third Division South Cup	R6; F (Note: Lost 6–2 on aggregate to Reading.)	Alf Rowles	18
1938–39	Div 3S	42	16	12	14	61	63	44	8th	R1	—	Third Division South Cup	QF	Lew Booth	15
1939–40	Div 3S	3	1	1	1	5	5	3	— (Note: The 1939–40 Football League season was abandoned with three matches played when the Second World War began.)	—	—	—	—	five players (Note: Dick Armstrong, Clarrie Bourton, Frank Curran, Frank Gallacher and John Turner each scored once before the 1939–40 season was abandoned.)	1
1939–45	League and FA Cup football was suspended until after the Second World War.														
1945–46	—	—	—	—	—	—	—	—	—	R4 (Note: Although the Football League did not resume until the 1946–47 season, the FA Cup was contested in 1945–46. From the first round proper to the sixth round (quarter-final), results were determined on aggregate score over two legs.)	—	—	—	—	—
1946–47	Div 3S	42	20	11	11	94	56	51	3rd	R2	—	—	—	Don Clark	36 ♦
1947–48	Div 3S	42	18	7	17	77	65	43	7th	R2	—	—	—	Len Townsend	29 ♦
1948–49	Div 3S	42	11	14	17	44	62	36	16th	R3	—	—	—	Len Townsend	14
1949–50	Div 3S	42	15	10	17	60	61	40	15th	R1	—	—	—	Arnold Rodgers	18
1950–51	Div 3S	46	20	11	15	64	59	51	10th	R5	—	—	—	Arnold Rodgers	20
1951–52	Div 3S	46	15	12	19	58	69	42	15th	R2	—	—	—	John Atyeo; Arnold Rodgers	12
1952–53	Div 3S	46	22	15	9	95	61	59	5th	R1	—	—	—	Arnold Rodgers	26
1953–54	Div 3S	46	25	6	15	88	66	56	3rd	R3	—	—	—	John Atyeo	22
1954–55	Div 3S ↑	46	30	10	6	101	47	70	1st	R1	—	—	—	John Atyeo	28
1955–56	Div 2	42	19	7	16	80	64	45	11th	R3	—	—	—	John Atyeo	30
1956–57	Div 2	42	16	9	17	74	79	41	13th	R5	—	—	—	John Atyeo	23
1957–58	Div 2	42	13	9	20	63	88	35	17th	R5	—	—	—	John Atyeo	23
1958–59	Div 2	42	17	7	18	74	70	41	10th	R4	—	—	—	John Atyeo	26
1959–60	Div 2 ↓	42	11	5	26	60	97	27	22nd	R3	—	—	—	John Atyeo; Jimmy Rogers	16
1960–61	Div 3	46	17	10	19	70	68	44	14th	R4	R3	—	—	John Atyeo	19
1961–62	Div 3	46	23	8	15	94	72	54	6th	R3	R1 (Note: The Football League Cup competition started in the 1960–61 season.)	Welsh Cup	QF	John Atyeo	26
1962–63	Div 3	46	16	13	17	100	92	45	14th	R3	R2	—	—	Brian Clark	23
1963–64	Div 3	46	20	15	11	84	64	55	5th	R4	R1	—	—	John Atyeo	21
1964–65	Div 3 ↑	46	24	11	11	92	55	59	2nd	R3	R2	—	—	John Atyeo; Brian Clark	23
1965–66	Div 2	42	17	17	8	63	48	51	5th	R3	R2	—	—	John Atyeo	19
1966–67	Div 2	42	12	14	16	56	62	38	15th	R5	R2	—	—	Roger Peters	9
1967–68	Div 2	42	13	10	19	48	62	36	19th	R5	R2	—	—	John Galley	26
1968–69	Div 2	42	11	16	15	46	53	38	16th	R3	R3	—	—	John Galley	18
1969–70	Div 2	42	13	13	16	54	50	39	14th	R3	R2	—	—	Gerry Sharpe	10
1970–71	Div 2	42	10	11	21	46	64	31	19th	R3	SF	—	—	John Galley	12
1971–72	Div 2	42	18	10	14	61	49	46	8th	R3	R1	—	—	John Galley	22
1972–73	Div 2	42	17	12	13	63	51	46	5th	R4	R2	—	—	Gerry Gow	12
1973–74	Div 2	42	14	10	18	47	54	38	16th	QF	R3	Watney Cup	SF	Keith Fear	8
1974–75	Div 2	42	21	8	13	47	33	50	5th	R3	R3	—	—	Keith Fear; Donnie Gillies	9
1975–76	Div 2 ↑	42	19	15	8	59	35	53	2nd	R3	R2	Anglo-Scottish Cup	Group	Tom Ritchie	18
1976–77	Div 1	42	11	13	18	38	48	35	19th	R3	R2	Anglo-Scottish Cup	Group	Chris Garland; Tom Ritchie	7
1977–78	Div 1	42	11	13	18	49	53	35	17th	R3	R3	Anglo-Scottish Cup	W (Note: Beat St Mirren 3–2 on aggregate in the final.)	Tom Ritchie	11
1978–79	Div 1	42	15	10	17	47	51	40	13th	R4	R2	Anglo-Scottish Cup	QF	Kevin Mabbutt; Tom Ritchie	9
1979–80	Div 1 ↓	42	9	13	20	37	66	31	20th	R4	R4	—	—	Tom Ritchie	13
1980–81	Div 2 ↓	42	7	16	19	29	51	30	21st	R5	R2	—	—	Kevin Mabbutt	9
1981–82	Div 3 ↓	46	11	13	22	40	65	46 (Note: The 1981–82 season saw the introduction of three points for a win instead of two.)	23rd	R4	R3	—	—	Mick Harford	11
1982–83	Div 4	46	13	17	16	59	70	56	14th	R1	R2	Football League Group Cup	Group	Glyn Riley	16
1983–84	Div 4 ↑	46	24	10	12	70	44	82	4th	R3	R1	Associate Members' Cup	R1	Glyn Riley	16
1984–85	Div 3	46	24	9	13	74	47	81	5th	R2	R2	Associate Members' Cup	QF(S)	Alan Walsh	20
1985–86	Div 3	46	18	14	14	69	60	68	9th	R2	R1	Associate Members' Cup	W (Note: Beat Bolton Wanderers 3–0 to win the Associate Members' Cup for the first time.)	Steve Neville	20
1986–87	Div 3	46	21	14	11	63	36	77	6th	R3	R2	Associate Members' Cup	F (Note: Lost to Mansfield Town on penalties in the final.)	Alan Walsh	16
1987–88	Div 3	46	21	12	13	77	62	75	5th (Note: After beating Sheffield United 2–1 on aggregate in the play-off semi-final, Bristol City drew 3–3 on aggregate with Walsall in the final, which meant a replay was required. The teams held a penalty shoot-out to decide which club would host the match; Bristol City lost the shoot-out and went on to lose the replay 4–0.)	R2	R1	Associate Members' Cup	R1(S)	Alan Walsh	12
1988–89	Div 3	46	18	9	19	53	55	63	11th	R3	SF	Associate Members' Cup	R1(S)	Alan Walsh	11
1989-90	Div 3 ↑	46	27	10	9	76	40	91	2nd	R5	R1	Associate Members' Cup	R1(S)	Bob Taylor	27 ♦
1990–91	Div 2	46	20	7	19	68	71	67	9th	R3	R2	Full Members Cup	R1(S)	Nicky Morgan	13
1991–92	Div 2	46	13	15	18	55	71	54	14th	R5	R2	Full Members Cup	R2(S)	Wayne Allison	10
1992–93	Div 1 (Note: The newly formed FA Premier League split from the Football League, and the remaining divisions of the Football League were renumbered upwards.)	46	14	14	18	49	67	56	15th	R3	R2	Anglo-Italian Cup	Int'l	Andy Cole	12
1993–94	Div 1	46	16	16	14	47	50	64	13th	R5	R1	Anglo-Italian Cup	Prelim	Wayne Allison	15
1994–95	Div 1 ↓	46	11	12	23	42	63	45	23rd	R4	R2	—	—	Wayne Allison	13
1995–96	Div 2	46	15	15	16	55	60	60	13th	R1	R2	—	—	Paul Agostino; David Seal	10
1996–97	Div 2	46	21	10	15	69	51	73	5th (Note: Lost 4–2 on aggregate to Brentford in the play-off semi-final.)	R3	R2	—	—	Shaun Goater	23
1997–98	Div 2 ↑	46	25	10	11	69	39	85	2nd	R2	R2	Football League Trophy	QF(S)	Shaun Goater	16
1998–99	Div 1 ↓	46	9	15	22	57	80	42	24th	R3	R2	—	—	Ade Akinbiyi	19
1999–2000	Div 2	46	15	19	12	59	57	64	9th	R3	R2	Football League Trophy	F (Note: Lost 2–1 to Stoke City in the final.)	Tony Thorpe	13
2000–01	Div 2	46	18	14	14	70	56	68	9th	R5	R1	Football League Trophy	R1(S)	Tony Thorpe	19
2001–02	Div 2	46	21	10	15	68	53	73	7th	R1	R2	Football League Trophy	F(S)	Tony Thorpe	17
2002–03	Div 2	46	24	11	11	79	48	83	3rd (Note: Lost 1–0 on aggregate to Cardiff City in the play-off semi-final.)	R3	R2	Football League Trophy	W (Note: Beat Carlisle United 2–0 in the final.)	Scott Murray	19
2003–04	Div 2	46	23	13	10	58	37	82	3rd (Note: After beating Hartlepool United 3–2 on aggregate in the play-off semi-final, lost 1–0 to Brighton & Hove Albion in the final.)	R2	R3	Football League Trophy	R1(S)	Lee Peacock	14
2004–05	League 1 (Note: From the 2004–05 season, the Football League divisions were rebranded: Division One was renamed the Football League Championship, and Divisions Two and Three became Football League One and Football League Two respectively.)	46	18	16	12	74	57	70	7th	R1	R2	Football League Trophy	QF(S)	Leroy Lita	24
2005–06	League 1	46	18	11	17	66	62	65	9th	R1	R1	Football League Trophy	R1(S)	Steve Brooker	16
2006–07	League 1 ↑	46	25	10	11	63	39	85	2nd	R4	R1	Football League Trophy	F(S) (Note: Lost 1–0 on aggregate to city rivals Bristol Rovers in the southern area final.)	Phil Jevons	11
2007–08	Champ	46	20	14	12	54	53	74	4th (Note: After beating Crystal Palace 4–2 on aggregate in the play-off semi-final, lost 1–0 to Hull City in the final.)	R3	R2	—	—	Darren Byfield	8
2008–09	Champ	46	15	16	15	54	54	61	10th	R3	R2	—	—	Nicky Maynard	11
2009–10	Champ	46	15	18	13	56	65	63	10th	R3	R2	—	—	Nicky Maynard	20 ♦
2010–11	Champ	46	17	9	20	62	65	60	15th	R3	R1	—	—	Brett Pitman	13
2011–12	Champ	46	12	13	21	44	68	49	20th	R3	R1	—	—	Nicky Maynard	8
2012–13	Champ ↓	46	11	8	27	59	84	41	24th	R3	R1	—	—	Steve Davies	13
2013–14	League 1	46	13	19	14	70	67	58	12th	R3	R3	Football League Trophy	R2(S)	Sam Baldock	24 ♦
2014–15	League 1 ↑	46	29	12	5	96	38	99	1st	R4	R1	Football League Trophy	W (Note: Beat Walsall 2–0 in the final to become the first team to win the trophy for a third time.)	Aaron Wilbraham	18
2015–16	Champ	46	13	13	20	54	71	52	18th	R3	R1	—	—	Jonathan Kodjia	19
2016–17	Champ	46	15	9	22	60	66	54	17th	R4	R4	—	—	Tammy Abraham	23
2017–18	Champ	46	17	16	13	67	58	67	11th	R3	SF	—	—	Bobby Reid	19
2018–19	Champ	46	19	13	14	59	53	70	8th	R5	R1	—	—	Famara Diédhiou	13
2019–20	Champ	46	17	12	17	60	65	63	12th	R3	R1	—	—	Famara Diédhiou	12
2020–21	Champ	46	15	6	25	46	68	51	19th	R5	R3	—	—	Nahki Wells	10
2021–22	Champ	46	15	10	21	62	77	55	17th	R3	R1	—	—	Andreas Weimann	22
2022–23	Champ	46	15	14	17	55	56	59	14th	R5	R3	—	—	Nahki Wells	11
2023–24	Champ	46	17	11	18	53	51	62	11th	R4	R2	—	—	Tommy Conway	10
2024–25	Champ	46	17	17	12	59	55	68	6th	R3	R1	—	—	Anis Mehmeti	12
2025–26	Champ	46	17	11	18	59	59	62	12th	R4	R2	—	—	Scott Twine	11
