= Coventry City 2–2 Bristol City (1977) =

Football match in England

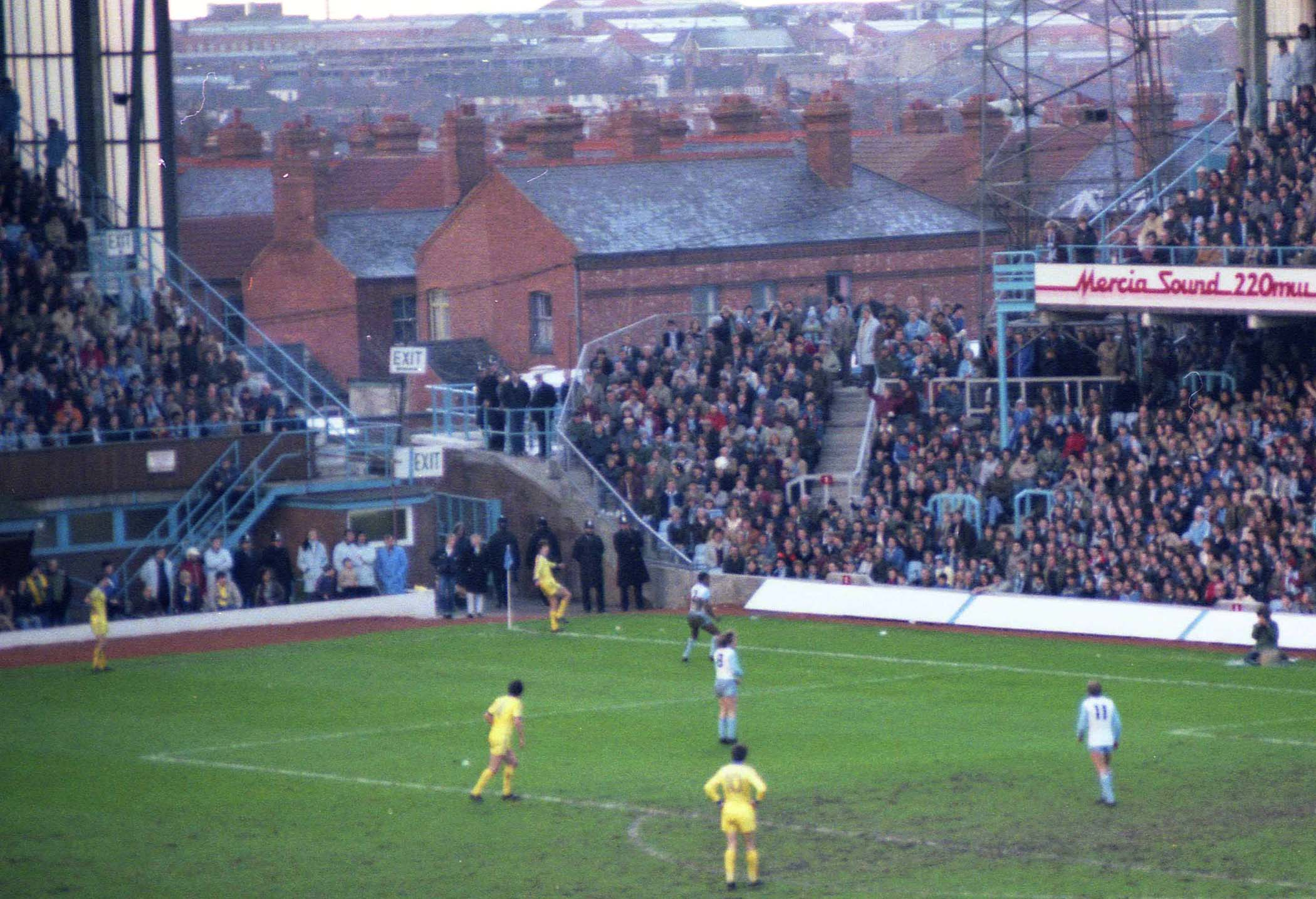
- The match took place at Highfield Road (pictured in 1982)
- Event: 1976–77 Football League
Coventry City	Bristol City
2	2
- Date: 19 May 1977
- Venue: Highfield Road, Coventry
- Referee: Ron Challis (Tonbridge)
- Attendance: 36,892

On 19 May 1977, the English association football clubs Coventry City and Bristol City contested a match in the Football League First Division at Highfield Road, Coventry. It was the final game of the 1976–77 Football League season for both clubs, and both faced possible relegation to the Second Division. A third club, Sunderland, were also in danger of relegation and were playing their final game at the same time, against Everton at Goodison Park.

As a result of many Bristol City supporters being delayed in traffic as they travelled to the game, the kick-off in the Coventry–Bristol City game was delayed by five minutes, to avoid crowd congestion. Coventry took a 2–0 lead with goals in the 15th and 51st minutes, both scored by midfielder Tommy Hutchison. Bristol City then scored through Gerry Gow and Donnie Gillies to level the match at 2–2 after 79 minutes. With five minutes remaining, the supporters and players received the news that Sunderland had lost to Everton and that a draw would be sufficient for both Coventry and Bristol City to escape relegation at Sunderland's expense. As a result, the last five minutes were played out with neither team's players attempting to score and the match finished as a 2–2 draw.

Sunderland made a complaint about the incident, and the Football League conducted an investigation, but both Coventry and Bristol City were eventually cleared of any wrongdoing.

== Background ==
Coventry City were playing their tenth season in the Football League First Division, the then-highest tier in English football, having achieved promotion under former manager Jimmy Hill in 1966–67. Hill left the club after only a few games in the top flight, having decided to pursue a career in broadcasting with London Weekend Television, and the club survived relegation battles on the final day of the season in both of their first two seasons. They had also achieved some success with a top-six finish in 1969–70, which earned them a place in the European Fairs Cup for the 1970–71 season. Hill had returned to the club as managing director in 1975 but he sold several key players and both bookmakers and the club's supporters believed that Coventry were favourites for relegation prior to the 1976–77 campaign. They lost the opening two games, but a victory against Leeds United, with Coventry's line-up featuring new signings Terry Yorath, Ian Wallace and Bobby McDonald, as well as a breakthrough performance by young striker Mick Ferguson, marked the start of a better run of form. By early December, they had risen to 10th position. A series of poor results followed after the new year, however, leaving the team in the bottom three going into the final game.

Bristol City had been promoted to the top flight from the Second Division in the 1975–76 season, finishing second behind Sunderland. They started the 1976–77 campaign with a surprise win against Arsenal at Highbury followed by a draw against Stoke City and a victory over Sunderland. The good start was tainted by a career-ending injury to striker Paul Cheesley against Stoke, and a 2–1 defeat against Manchester City marked the start of a dramatic fall down the table from second to twentieth between September and October. Lacking a quality forward, Bristol City failed to score goals and their slide down the table included a run of six defeats with only two goals scored. Their manager Alan Dicks was unable to find a striker on the transfer market, but his signing of veteran Leeds United defender Norman Hunter briefly revived the club's fortunes. Wins over Tottenham Hotspur and Norwich City took them briefly out of the relegation zone to 17th place, but Bristol City's form was poor after Christmas. Although they achieved a second win of the season against Arsenal, they suffered defeat to then-bottom-placed Sunderland at Roker Park, and a run of just one win in nine games up to early April left Bristol City themselves at the bottom of the table. A better run followed, including another win over Tottenham, and a surprise win over Liverpool at Ashton Gate in the penultimate game left Bristol City needing only a draw against Coventry to guarantee survival.

In addition to Coventry and Bristol City, Sunderland were the third team involved in the last-day relegation fight. They had been promoted from the Second Division as champions the previous season, but they performed poorly in the first half of the campaign and were bottom of the table in mid-January. They performed much better thereafter, and by the last week of the season had secured nine wins and seven draws from their previous eighteen games.

Coventry and Bristol City had played each other twice in the 1976–77 season. The first meeting was at Ashton Gate in late August in the second round of the Football League Cup, the fourth cup match between the two clubs in just three years. For the fourth time in those encounters, it was Coventry who prevailed, winning the game 1–0 with a Ferguson goal after 41 minutes. Bristol City had numerous chances to score throughout the game, but Coventry kept a clean sheet as a result of a string of saves by goalkeeper Jim Blyth. The sides met again at Ashton Gate in the league fixture on 6 November 1976. It was a match of few shots on goal as both sides failed to establish sustained attacks. The limited chances that did materialise were wasted, and the game finished 0–0. The league fixture at Coventry's Highfield Road ground was originally scheduled for New Year's Day, but was postponed until the end of the season due to a frozen pitch.

== Pre-match ==
Bottom of the Division One table prior to the match (Note: The 1976–77 season preceded the introduction of three points for a win, so a win was worth 2 points and a draw worth 1 point.)
Pos	Team	Pld	W	D	L	GF	GA	GD	Pts	Relegation
17	West Ham United	42	11	14	17	46	65	−19	36	
18	Sunderland	41	11	12	18	46	52	−6	34	
19	Bristol City	41	11	12	18	36	46	−10	34	
20	Coventry City	41	10	14	17	46	57	−11	34	Relegation zone
21	Stoke City	42	10	14	18	28	51	−23	34	Relegation zone
22	Tottenham Hotspur (R)	42	12	9	21	48	72	−24	33	Relegation zone

(R) Relegated

Tottenham, Stoke and West Ham had completed all their league fixtures by the previous Monday. Tottenham were already confirmed as relegated, while Stoke's goal difference was so inferior to that of Coventry, Bristol City and Sunderland that their chances of survival were effectively nonexistent. (Note: According to reporters at the Aberdeen Press and Journal on 17 May 1977: "Stoke have the same points – 34 – as Sunderland, Bristol City and Coventry, but for them the season is over and their goal difference is so inferior that they must go down with Tottenham.") West Ham United had finished with two more points, but could not be overtaken by all three teams below them and were thus safe. This left Bristol City, Coventry and Sunderland battling to avoid the final relegation position. A draw would have been sufficient for Sunderland to achieve safety, by finishing ahead of at least one of the other two clubs. Similarly, Bristol City could avoid relegation by drawing the game, as that would guarantee their finishing above Coventry. Coventry needed a win to guarantee their safety, but they could also survive by drawing the game if Sunderland were to lose.

Sunderland's final game of the season was away against Everton, at Goodison Park, and was to be played at the same time as Coventry City's match against Bristol City.

Approximately 10,000 of the 36,892 supporters were Bristol City fans, many of whom were delayed in traffic as they travelled to Coventry. As a result of this, to avoid crowd congestion, the kick-off was put back by five minutes. This was to prove very significant as the evening progressed, although club historians are not certain whether it was initiated by Coventry City, by the West Midlands Police or by the referee, Ron Challis. Hill later wrote in his autobiography that the decision had been made by the referee, whereas The Guardian's Rob Smyth maintained in a 2012 article that it was "generally perceived that [the delay] was the doing of Hill".

== Match ==
=== Summary ===
Coventry began the match in attacking style, seeking to secure the win which for them was the only way to be certain of survival. Committing several players to attack left Coventry vulnerable, and Bristol City twice found themselves with the ball behind Coventry's defence. The two chances fell to Chris Garland and Jimmy Mann, but neither was able to beat Coventry goalkeeper Les Sealey. Two minutes after Mann's miss, Coventry took the lead. A free kick by Mick Coop was parried weakly by Bristol City goalkeeper John Shaw and fell to Tommy Hutchison, who scored his second goal of the season with a powerful shot. Bristol City had several chances to equalise just before half-time – first through a goal-line clearance by McDonald, then through Trevor Tainton, whose 20-yard shot was saved by Sealey. The final Bristol City chance of the half resulted from a Coventry defensive mix-up; Yorath allowed a pass from Donnie Gillies through to Sealey, but the goalkeeper was not expecting it and the ball only narrowly missed the Coventry goal. The score remained 1–0 to Coventry at half-time.

Seven minutes into the second half, Coventry scored again to double their lead to 2–0. Barry Powell hit the goalpost with a shot, and when it rebounded, Hutchison scored his second goal of the game with a shot which went in off the crossbar. Bristol City's historian David Woods wrote that "it looked all up" for them at this point, with the club apparently heading for relegation, but he noted that "fortunately, the players did not give up the ghost". They pulled a goal back just a few minutes after Coventry's second, when Gerry Gow received the ball from Gillies and fired a shot past Sealey from 12 yards. From that moment, Bristol City began to dominate the game, doing all the attacking as Coventry's defence struggled. Peter Cormack came on as a substitute to replace the injured Clive Whitehead, and Bristol City continued to seek the equaliser. That arrived in the 79th minute, when Garland headed the ball across to Gillies who struck it into the far corner of the Coventry goal. With the match level, it was once again Coventry who needed to score again to be certain of survival, but their players were exhausted and it was Bristol City who continued to press, looking for a winner.

With five minutes remaining, news reached the Coventry directors' box that the game at Goodison Park was over, the earlier finish a consequence of the delayed start in the Coventry–Bristol City game. Everton had beaten Sunderland 2–0, which meant that should the game at Highfield Road remain a draw, both sides would be safe at Sunderland's expense. Conversely, if either side were to lose, that side would be relegated. Jimmy Hill immediately went to speak to the scoreboard operator, asking for the Everton–Sunderland score to be displayed across the ground. Seeing this, and realising its significance, the two sides called an unofficial truce. Coventry retreated to their own half, making no further attempt to gain the ball or to score, while Bristol City passed the ball around between their defence and goalkeeper, similarly making no attempt to advance up the field. The final five minutes were played out in this fashion, in what authors Geoff Harvey and Vanessa Strowger later described as "a good-natured kickabout". Referee Challis called a halt to the game without playing any injury time, and it finished as a 2–2 draw.

=== Details ===
19 May 1977

Coventry City	2–2	Bristol City
Hutchison 15', 51'	Report	Gow 52'; Gillies 79'

Highfield Road, Coventry
Attendance: 36,892
Referee: Ron Challis (Tonbridge)

Coventry City	Bristol City

1	(England) Les Sealey
2	(England) Graham Oakey
3	(Scotland) Bobby McDonald
4	(Wales) Terry Yorath
5	(Scotland) Jim Holton
6	(England) Mick Coop
7	(England) John Beck
8	(Scotland) Ian Wallace
9	(England) Mick Ferguson
10	(England) Barry Powell
11	(Scotland) Tommy Hutchison
Manager:
(England) Gordon Milne

1	(Scotland) John Shaw
2	(Scotland) Donnie Gillies
3	(Scotland) Gerry Sweeney
4	(Scotland) Gerry Gow
5	(England) Gary Collier
6	(England) Norman Hunter
7	(England) Trevor Tainton
8	(Scotland) Tom Ritchie
9	(England) Chris Garland
10	(England) Jimmy Mann
11	(England) Clive Whitehead	(substituted off)
Substitutes:
12	(Scotland) Peter Cormack	(substituted on)
Manager:
(England) Alan Dicks

Match rules

- 90 minutes, no extra time or penalties.
- Two points awarded to winner, none to loser.
- One point awarded to each in the event of a draw.

== Post-match and legacy ==
Bottom of the Division One table at the end of the 1976–77 season
Pos	Team	Pld	W	D	L	GF	GA	GD	Pts	Relegation
17	West Ham United	42	11	14	17	46	65	−19	36	
18	Bristol City	42	11	13	18	38	48	−10	35	
19	Coventry City	42	10	15	17	48	59	−11	35	
20	Sunderland (R)	42	11	12	19	46	54	−8	34	Relegated
21	Stoke City (R)	42	10	14	18	28	51	−23	34	Relegated
22	Tottenham Hotspur (R)	42	12	9	21	48	72	−24	33	Relegated

(R) Relegated

When the match concluded, the players embraced each other, while the supporters of both teams began to celebrate their mutual survival together. Hundreds of supporters invaded the pitch after the game, while some climbed onto the roofs of the executive boxes. Supporters of both teams went to Coventry city centre after the game to continue the celebrations, with some causing damage to infrastructure. Seventeen Bristol City and three Coventry supporters were arrested for assaulting police officers, threatening behaviour and drunkenness.

At Goodison Park, many Sunderland supporters had remained in the ground after the conclusion of their match to await news from Coventry. The result was announced on the public-address system, bringing the news that their team would be relegated. Sunderland made a complaint about the incident, and the Football League (FL) conducted an investigation. Coventry were eventually cleared of any wrong-doing, although the FL secretary Alan Hardaker sent a letter to the club "reprimanding Coventry City for their actions".

Supporters of Sunderland maintained a grudge against Hill and Coventry City for decades after the match. At a 2008 game between Sunderland and Fulham – a club for which Hill had worked as both player and chairman – the visiting Sunderland fans directed angry chants towards Hill when he entered the pitch as part of a pre-match tribute to Johnny Haynes. Hill waved to the fans in response, but he had to receive a police escort for his safety.

Coventry and Sunderland were involved in another last-day relegation battle 20 years later, at the end of the 1996–97 FA Premier League season. Coventry, managed at the time by Gordon Strachan, required a win against Tottenham Hotspur at White Hart Lane to survive, in addition to favourable results in games involving Sunderland and Middlesbrough. David Lacey of The Guardian mentioned the 1977 events in advance of the game, commenting that "should Sunderland survive at Coventry's expense ... Wearside will feel that an ancient wrong ... has been put right". As in 1977, Coventry's game started late, by 15 minutes, again as a result of travelling fans being delayed in traffic. Sunderland lost their game, while Middlesbrough drew, at which point Coventry were leading 2–1 with 15 minutes remaining. Manchester United manager Alex Ferguson later labelled this situation a "disgrace", but Strachan thought that the delay had hindered his players. He told reporters that knowing the outcome was in their hands, and that conceding a goal would relegate them, caused them to lose control of a game they had been dominating. Coventry held on for the win, consigning both Sunderland and Middlesbrough to relegation. Discussing the late kick-off, journalist Glenn Moore of The Independent commented that it evoked "memories of the notorious escape of 1977".

== See also ==
- 2021 Los Angeles Chargers–Las Vegas Raiders game, the final NFL game where both teams would have reached the playoffs with a tie
- West Germany 1–0 Austria, 1982 World Cup result which saw both teams proceed at the expense of Algeria
- Worcestershire v Somerset, 1979, a similar situation in one-day cricket

== General and cited references ==
- Brassington, David (1989). Singers to Sky Blues: The story of Coventry City Football Club (second ed.). Buckingham, UK: Sporting and Leisure Press Limited. ISBN 978-0-86023-452-4.
- Brown, Jim (1998). Coventry City: The Elite Era : a Complete Record. Westcliff-on-Sea, UK: Desert Island Books. ISBN 978-1-87428-703-2.
- Harvey, Geoff & Strowger, Vanessa (2004). Rivals: The Off-Beat Guide to the 92 League Clubs. Buckingham, UK: Aesculus Press Ltd. ISBN 978-1-90432-813-1.
- Hudson, John & Callaghan, Paul, eds. (1999). Sunderland A.F.C. – the official history 1879–2000. Sunderland, UK: Leighton. ISBN 978-0-95369-841-7.
- Woods, David (2000). Bristol City: The Modern Era: A Complete Record. Westcliff-on-Sea, UK: Desert Island Books. ISBN 978-1-87428-728-5.
