= 1976–77 Football League First Division =

1976–77 season of Football League First Division

Football League First Division
- Season: 1976–77
- Champions: Liverpool; 10th English title
- Relegated: Sunderland; Stoke City; Tottenham Hotspur
- European Cup: Liverpool
- European Cup Winners' Cup: Manchester United
- UEFA Cup: Manchester City; Ipswich Town; Aston Villa; Newcastle United
- Matches: 462
- Goals: 1,183 (2.56 per match)
- Top goalscorer: Andy Gray; Malcolm Macdonald (25 goals each)
- Biggest home win: Ipswich Town 7–0 West Bromwich Albion (6 November 1976)
- Biggest away win: Leicester City 0–5 West Bromwich Albion (7 March 1977)
- Highest scoring: Derby County 8–2 Tottenham Hotspur (16 October 1976)

Statistics of Football League First Division in the 1976–77 season.

== Overview ==
Liverpool retained their league championship trophy and won their first European Cup to confirm Bob Paisley as a successful replacement for Bill Shankly in his third season at the helm. Tottenham Hotspur and Stoke City's long spells in the First Division came to an end with relegation. Stoke sacked their manager Tony Waddington. On the last day of the season, Coventry City and Bristol City played out a controversial 2–2 draw, with play virtually stopping when it was heard that Sunderland had lost to Everton. Both clubs survived while Sunderland were relegated.

After Manchester United manager Tommy Docherty had admitted his affair with the wife of the club's physiotherapist, the club's directors decided that he had broken their moral code and he was sacked.

== League standings ==
Pos	Team	Pld	W	D	L	GF	GA	GD	Pts	Qualification or relegation
1	Liverpool (C)	42	23	11	8	62	33	+29	57	Qualification for the European Cup second round
2	Manchester City	42	21	14	7	60	34	+26	56	Qualification for the UEFA Cup first round
3	Ipswich Town	42	22	8	12	66	39	+27	52	Qualification for the UEFA Cup first round
4	Aston Villa	42	22	7	13	76	50	+26	51	Qualification for the UEFA Cup first round
5	Newcastle United	42	18	13	11	64	49	+15	49	Qualification for the UEFA Cup first round
6	Manchester United	42	18	11	13	71	62	+9	47	Qualification for the European Cup Winners' Cup first round (Note: Manchester United qualified for the European Cup Winners' Cup first round as the 1976–77 FA Cup winners.)
7	West Bromwich Albion	42	16	13	13	62	56	+6	45	
8	Arsenal	42	16	11	15	64	59	+5	43	
9	Everton	42	14	14	14	62	64	−2	42	
10	Leeds United	42	15	12	15	48	51	−3	42	
11	Leicester City	42	12	18	12	47	60	−13	42	
12	Middlesbrough	42	14	13	15	40	45	−5	41	
13	Birmingham City	42	13	12	17	63	61	+2	38	
14	Queens Park Rangers	42	13	12	17	47	52	−5	38	
15	Derby County	42	9	19	14	50	55	−5	37	
16	Norwich City	42	14	9	19	47	64	−17	37	
17	West Ham United	42	11	14	17	46	65	−19	36	
18	Bristol City	42	11	13	18	38	48	−10	35	
19	Coventry City	42	10	15	17	48	59	−11	35	
20	Sunderland (R)	42	11	12	19	46	54	−8	34	Relegation to the Second Division
21	Stoke City (R)	42	10	14	18	28	51	−23	34	Relegation to the Second Division
22	Tottenham Hotspur (R)	42	12	9	21	48	72	−24	33	Relegation to the Second Division

Source: World Football
Rules for classification: 1) Points; 2) Goal difference; 3) Goals scored
(C) Champions; (R) Relegated

=== Stats ===
Record

- Most wins: Liverpool (23)
- Fewest losses: Manchester City (7)
- Most goals scored: Aston Villa (76)
- Fewest goals conceded: Liverpool (33)
- Best goal difference ratio: Liverpool (+29)
- Most draws: Derby County (19)
- Fewest draws: Aston Villa (7)
- Most losses: Tottenham Hotspur
- Fewest wins: Derby County (9)
- Fewest goals scored: Stoke City (28)
- Most goals conceded: Tottenham Hotspur (72)
- Worst goal difference ratio: Tottenham Hotspur (–24)

== Results ==
Home \ Away	ARS	AST	BIR	BRI	COV	DER	EVE	IPS	LEE	LEI	LIV	MCI	MUN	MID	NEW	NWC	QPR	STK	SUN	TOT	WBA	WHU
Arsenal		3–0	4–0	0–1	2–0	0–0	3–1	1–4	1–1	3–0	1–1	0–0	3–1	1–1	5–3	1–0	3–2	2–0	0–0	1–0	1–2	2–3
Aston Villa	5–1		1–2	3–1	2–2	4–0	2–0	5–2	2–1	2–0	5–1	1–1	3–2	1–0	2–1	1–0	1–1	1–0	4–1	2–1	4–0	4–0
Birmingham City	3–3	2–1		3–0	3–1	5–1	1–1	2–4	0–0	1–1	2–1	0–0	2–3	3–1	1–2	3–2	2–1	2–0	2–0	1–2	0–1	0–0
Bristol City	2–0	0–0	0–1		0–0	2–2	1–2	1–2	1–0	0–1	2–1	1–0	1–1	1–2	1–1	3–1	1–0	1–1	4–1	1–0	1–2	1–1
Coventry City	1–2	2–3	2–1	2–2		2–0	4–2	1–1	4–2	1–1	0–0	0–1	0–2	1–1	1–1	2–0	2–0	5–2	1–2	1–1	1–1	1–1
Derby County	0–0	2–1	0–0	2–0	1–1		2–3	0–0	0–1	1–0	2–3	4–0	0–0	0–0	4–2	2–2	2–0	2–0	1–0	8–2	2–2	1–1
Everton	2–1	0–2	2–2	2–0	1–1	2–0		1–1	0–2	1–2	0–0	2–2	1–2	2–2	2–0	3–1	1–3	3–0	2–0	4–0	1–1	3–2
Ipswich Town	3–1	1–0	1–0	1–0	2–1	0–0	2–0		1–1	0–0	1–0	1–0	2–1	0–1	2–0	5–0	2–2	0–1	3–1	3–1	7–0	4–1
Leeds United	2–1	1–3	1–0	2–0	1–2	2–0	0–0	2–1		2–2	1–1	0–2	0–2	2–1	2–2	3–2	0–1	1–1	1–1	2–1	2–2	1–1
Leicester City	4–1	1–1	2–6	0–0	3–1	1–1	1–1	1–0	0–1		0–1	2–2	1–1	3–3	1–0	1–1	2–2	1–0	2–0	2–1	0–5	2–0
Liverpool	2–0	3–0	4–1	2–1	3–1	3–1	3–1	2–1	3–1	5–1		2–1	1–0	0–0	1–0	1–0	3–1	4–0	2–0	2–0	1–1	0–0
Manchester City	1–0	2–0	2–1	2–1	2–0	3–2	1–1	2–1	2–1	5–0	1–1		1–3	1–0	0–0	2–0	0–0	0–0	1–0	5–0	1–0	4–2
Manchester United	3–2	2–0	2–2	2–1	2–0	3–1	4–0	0–1	1–0	1–1	0–0	3–1		2–0	3–1	2–2	1–0	3–0	3–3	2–3	2–2	0–2
Middlesbrough	3–0	3–2	2–2	0–0	1–0	2–0	2–2	0–2	1–0	0–1	0–1	0–0	3–0		1–0	1–0	0–2	0–0	2–1	2–0	1–0	1–1
Newcastle United	0–2	3–2	3–2	0–0	1–0	2–2	4–1	1–1	3–0	0–0	1–0	2–2	2–2	1–0		5–1	2–0	1–0	2–0	2–0	2–0	3–0
Norwich City	1–3	1–1	1–0	2–1	3–0	0–0	2–1	0–1	1–2	3–2	2–1	0–2	2–1	1–0	3–2		2–0	1–1	2–2	1–3	1–0	1–0
Queens Park Rangers	2–1	2–1	2–2	0–1	1–1	1–1	0–4	1–0	0–0	3–2	1–1	0–0	4–0	3–0	1–2	2–3		2–0	2–0	2–1	1–0	1–1
Stoke City	1–1	1–0	1–0	2–2	2–0	1–0	0–1	2–1	2–1	0–1	0–0	0–2	3–3	3–1	0–0	0–0	1–0		0–0	0–0	0–2	2–1
Sunderland	2–2	0–1	1–0	1–0	0–1	1–1	0–1	1–0	0–1	0–0	0–1	0–2	2–1	4–0	2–2	0–1	1–0	0–0		2–1	6–1	6–0
Tottenham Hotspur	2–2	3–1	1–0	0–1	0–1	0–0	3–3	1–0	1–0	2–0	1–0	2–2	1–3	0–0	0–2	1–1	3–0	2–0	1–1		0–2	2–1
West Bromwich Albion	0–2	1–1	2–1	1–1	1–1	1–0	3–0	4–0	1–2	2–2	0–1	0–2	4–0	2–1	1–1	2–0	1–1	3–1	2–3	4–2		3–0
West Ham United	0–2	0–1	2–2	2–0	2–0	2–2	2–2	0–2	1–3	0–0	2–0	1–0	4–2	0–1	1–2	1–0	1–0	1–0	1–1	5–3	0–0	

Updated to match(es) played on unknown. Source: Ian Laschke: Rothmans Book of Football League Records 1888–89 to 1978–79. Macdonald and Jane’s, London & Sydney, 1980.
Legend: Blue = home team win; Yellow = draw; Red = away team win.

== Managerial changes ==
Team	Outgoing manager	Manner of departure	Date of vacancy	Position in table	Incoming manager	Date of appointment
Arsenal	(England) Bertie Mee	Retired	4 May 1976	Pre-season	(Northern Ireland) Terry Neill	7 July 1976
Tottenham Hotspur	(Northern Ireland) Terry Neill	Signed by Arsenal	7 July 1976	Pre-season	(England) Keith Burkinshaw	7 July 1976
Sunderland	(England) Bob Stokoe	Resigned	18 October 1976	22nd	(England) Jimmy Adamson	1 December 1976
Derby County	(Scotland) Dave Mackay	Resigned	25 November 1976	19th	(England) Colin Murphy	25 November 1976
Everton	(Northern Ireland) Billy Bingham	Sacked	8 January 1977	15th	(England) Gordon Lee	1 February 1977
Newcastle United	(England) Gordon Lee	Signed by Everton	1 February 1977	7th	(England) Richard Dinnis	1 February 1977
Stoke City	(England) Tony Waddington	Mutual consent	22 March 1977	14th	(England) George Eastham	24 March 1977
Middlesbrough	(England) Jack Charlton	Resigned	2 April 1977	10th	(England) Harold Shepherdson (caretaker)	2 April 1977

== Team locations ==
Locations of the Football League First Division 1976–1977 teams
Locations of the Football League First Division London teams 1976–1977
