= 1976–77 in English football =

Football in England
- Season: 1976–77

Men's football
- First Division: Liverpool
- Second Division: Wolverhampton Wanderers
- Third Division: Mansfield Town
- Fourth Division: Cambridge United
- FA Cup: Manchester United
- Anglo-Scottish Cup: Nottingham Forest
- League Cup: Aston Villa
- Charity Shield: Liverpool

The 1976–77 season was the 97th season of competitive football in England. This year The Football League revamped the tie-breaking criteria for teams level on points, replacing the traditional goal average tiebreaker with one based on goal difference to try to encourage more scoring. Coloured red and yellow cards were introduced for the first time in domestic English football.

== Diary of the season ==
21 August 1976: The First Division season opens with a surprise 1–0 win for promoted Bristol City over Arsenal at Highbury. Champions Liverpool beat Norwich City 1–0, but last year's runners-up Queens Park Rangers lose 4–0 at home to Everton.

31 August 1976: No fewer than nine teams are level on four points at the top of the First Division after three matches. Aston Villa lead on goal difference. Norwich City are the only team yet to register a point.

22 September 1976: West Bromwich Albion winger Willie Johnston is sent off, reportedly for "aiming a kick" at the referee, as his side are eliminated from the League Cup by Brighton & Hove Albion.

30 September 1976: Liverpool lead the First Division at the end of September, level on points with Middlesbrough. The two Manchester clubs are a point behind.

9 October 1976: Surprise package Middlesbrough move to the top of the First Division table following a 1–0 win at home to Norwich City.

13 October 1976: England beat Finland 2–1 at Wembley in their second World Cup qualifier.

16 October 1976: The 1975 champions Derby County belatedly record their first League win of the season when they thrash Tottenham Hotspur 8–2 at the Baseball Ground. Newly promoted West Bromwich Albion beat Manchester United 4–0.

18 October 1976: Sunderland manager Bob Stokoe stuns the world of football by handing in his resignation, saying that he believes a new manager will give the club a better chance of First Division survival. Despite a poor start which has seen the club marooned at the bottom of the table with no wins, Stokoe was still incredibly popular among the Roker Park faithful, due to his role in the club's victory in the 1973 FA Cup final.

31 October 1976: Liverpool are the First Division leaders at the end of October, three points ahead of a chasing group that comprises Manchester City, Ipswich Town, Newcastle United, Leicester City and Middlesbrough. West Ham United are bottom, and Sunderland and Bristol City make up the bottom three.

6 November 1976: Ipswich Town move up to second in the First Division with a 7–0 thrashing of West Bromwich Albion. Tottenham Hotspur suffer another heavy defeat, 5–3 at struggling West Ham United.

17 November 1976: With a team featuring six changes from their previous match, England suffer a major set-back in their attempt to reach the World Cup Finals when they are beaten 2–0 by Italy in Rome.

25 November 1976: Barely 18 months after winning the First Division title, Derby County manager Dave Mackay resigns following a poor start to the season, which has left the club just a single point off the bottom of the table. Reserve team coach Colin Murphy takes over as caretaker manager of the club, who are rumoured to be looking to reappoint former manager Brian Clough.

30 November 1976: Liverpool retain a three-point lead from Ipswich Town and Newcastle United at the end of November. Tottenham Hotspur have joined West Ham United and Sunderland in the relegation zone.

2 December 1976: After over a month without a permanent manager, Sunderland announce former Burnley manager Jimmy Adamson as Bob Stokoe's successor.

4 December 1976: Malcolm Macdonald scores a hat-trick for Arsenal in their 5–3 League win over his old team Newcastle United.

15 December 1976: Aston Villa beat Liverpool 5–1 in the League at Villa Park.

31 December 1976: At the end of the year, Liverpool's lead at the top of the First Division has been cut to two points over Ipswich Town, who have three games in hand, and Manchester City. Sunderland, West Ham United and Tottenham Hotspur continue to occupy the relegation zone.

8 January 1977: Tottenham Hotspur are beaten 1–0 by Second Division Cardiff City in the FA Cup third round. Northern Premier League side Northwich Victoria beat Watford 3–2.

10 January 1977: Everton sack manager Billy Bingham. The club had looked like possible title challengers early in the season, but a poor run of form has dropped them to the lower reaches of the table.

30 January 1977: Newcastle United manager Gordon Lee is appointed as Everton's new manager. Lee's assistant at Newcastle, Richard Dinnis takes over as acting manager of the Tyneside club.

31 January 1977: Liverpool still lead the First Division, but Ipswich Town are now just a point behind, and still have three games in hand. Manchester City are a further two points adrift.

2 February 1977: The Newcastle United squad, led by captain Geoff Nulty, threaten to strike unless Richard Dinnis is appointed as the club's permanent manager, with frictions exacerbated by the board signing Ralph Callachan without consulting either Dinnis or the other players. Later that day however, the board agree to the players' demands and appoint Dinnis as manager.

9 February 1977: England lose at home for the first time for four years when they are beaten 2–0 by Holland at Wembley.

15 February 1977: Ipswich Town move to the top of the First Division with a 5–0 thrashing of Norwich City in the East Anglia derby.

26 February 1977: Middlesbrough dump Arsenal out of the FA Cup with a 4–1 win at Ayresome Park in the fifth round. Manchester City lose 1–0 to Leeds United, and Manchester United draw 2–2 against Southampton in a repeat of last year's final.

28 February 1977: Two successive defeats for Ipswich Town have allowed Liverpool to regain top spot in the race for the title. At the bottom, Tottenham Hotspur now prop up the table, and are joined by Sunderland and Bristol City in the relegation zone.

5 March 1977: In a spectacular change in form, Sunderland beat West Ham United 6–0 at Roker Park. It is their third consecutive victory in a run in which they have scored sixteen goals.

8 March 1977: Holders Southampton are knocked out of the FA Cup 2–1 by Manchester United in their fifth round replay.

12 March 1977: The League Cup final ends in a 0–0 draw between Aston Villa and Everton at Wembley. Arsenal's 2–1 loss to Queens Park Rangers is their seventh consecutive League defeat, a club record.

16 March 1977: The Football League Cup final replay at Hillsborough ends in a 1–1 draw.

19 March 1977: First Division heavyweights Everton, Leeds United, Liverpool and Manchester United all win their FA Cup sixth round ties to reach the last four.

20 March 1977: Peter Houseman, who helped Chelsea win the FA Cup in 1970 and the European Cup Winners' Cup a year later, dies in a car crash at the age of 31. His wife is among the four people who die in the crash, which occurred near Oxford.

31 March 1977: With ten matches left, Ipswich Town have joined Liverpool at the top of the First Division table. Manchester City are three points behind with a game in hand, and Newcastle United are still in contention, a further point adrift. At the bottom, West Ham United, Sunderland, Derby County and Bristol City are separated by a single point.

9 April 1977: Liverpool beat Manchester City 2–1 in a crunch League match at Anfield. Ipswich Town continue their challenge by winning 1–0 at Norwich City.

13 April 1977: The Football League Cup final is decided at the third attempt when Aston Villa beat Everton 3–2 in the second replay at Old Trafford. A last minute goal from Brian Little sends the trophy to Villa Park and prevents the game from going to a third replay.

23 April 1977: Everton and Liverpool draw 2–2 in the FA Cup semi-final at Maine Road, with referee Clive Thomas disallowing a late goal from Everton's Bryan Hamilton. At Hillsborough, Manchester United beat Leeds United 2–1 to reach the final for the second consecutive year.

27 April 1977: Liverpool beat Everton 3–0 in the semi-final replay to reach the FA Cup final.

30 April 1977: Liverpool effectively end Ipswich Town's title challenge by beating them 2–1 at Anfield. Manchester City crash to a 4–0 defeat at relegation-threatened Derby County and are now two points behind the Reds having played a game more. Meanwhile, half the clubs in the division remain in danger of relegation: Bristol City are bottom, but just five points separate the ten teams immediately above them, with Tottenham Hotspur in most danger, having played more games than their rivals.

7 May 1977: Tottenham Hotspur's first relegation since 1935 is virtually guaranteed after the Londoners are thrashed 5–0 at Manchester City.

14 May 1977: Liverpool are confirmed champions of the First Division for the second season running and for the tenth time in total following a 0–0 draw with West Ham United. Manchester City finish second. Tottenham Hotspur's relegation is confirmed, but in an extraordinarily close finish to the season, six other clubs are still fighting to avoid the other two relegation spots.

16 May 1977: Stoke City lose 1–0 to Aston Villa and are relegated. West Ham United and Queens Park Rangers win their last matches of the season to survive, and Bristol City keep their hopes alive by beating Liverpool 2–1. They go into their last match level on points with Coventry City and Sunderland.

19 May 1977: Coventry City and Bristol City draw 2–2 at Highfield Road and both survive in the First Division as Sunderland lose 2–0 at Everton to take the final relegation slot.

21 May 1977: Liverpool's treble bid ends when they lose 2–1 to Manchester United in the FA Cup final. It is United's first major trophy since they won the European Cup nine years ago.

24 May 1977: The First Division fixture schedule is completed when Everton beat Newcastle United. Just five points separate the bottom ten clubs in one of the closest finishes in the history of the League.

25 May 1977: Liverpool win the European Cup for the first time, defeating Borussia Mönchengladbach of West Germany 3-1 Stadio Olimpico in Rome.

28 May 1977: Wimbledon, champions of the Southern League, are elected to the Fourth Division at the expense of Workington, who drop into the Northern Premier League.

31 May 1977: England lose to Wales at Wembley for the first time when Leighton James scores the only goal from the penalty spot in a Home Championship fixture.

4 June 1977: Scotland beat England 2–1 at Wembley to clinch the Home Championship, but their victory is overshadowed by a pitch invasion by celebrating supporters.

15 June 1977: After previous draws against Brazil and Argentina, England end their South American summer tour with a 0–0 draw against Uruguay.

1 July 1977: Liverpool sell striker Kevin Keegan to Hamburger SV for a European record fee of £500,000.

4 July 1977: Just six weeks after managing Manchester United to FA Cup glory, Tommy Docherty is sacked by the United board soon after admitting to having an affair with Mary Brown, the wife of club physiotherapist Laurie Brown.

11 July 1977: Don Revie announces his resignation as England manager after three years.

14 July 1977: Dave Sexton is announced as the new Manchester United manager.

== UEFA competitions ==
Liverpool won the European Cup for the first time, beating Borussia Mönchengladbach 3–1 in the final in Rome.

== FA Cup ==
Tommy Docherty guided Manchester United to a 2–1 win over Liverpool in the FA Cup final, but was sacked within weeks after announcing his affair with the wife of the club's physiotherapist.

A new competition, the Debenhams Cup, was introduced to reward the two teams from outside the top two divisions to progress furthest in the FA Cup. Chester beat Port Vale in the final but the competition was to last for only two seasons.

== League Cup ==
Ron Saunders took Aston Villa to their second League Cup victory in three seasons as the Midlanders continued to re-establish themselves as a top club.

== Football League ==
=== First Division ===
Liverpool retained their league championship trophy after a season long neck and neck battle with Ipswich Town and Manchester City that came down to the final game, City edging out Ipswich for second place.

Ipswich finished third, Aston Villa finished fourth and won their second League Cup in three seasons, while Newcastle United completed the top five. Manchester United finished sixth but beat Liverpool 2–1 to win the FA Cup final and prevent their opponents from becoming the first English team to win a treble of trophies in the same season.

Queens Park Rangers dropped to 14th place a year after almost winning the title, while 1975 champions Derby County finished 15th, with manager Dave Mackay being sacked before Christmas and replaced by 26-year-old coach Colin Murphy, one of the youngest managers ever to take charge of a Football League side.

Tottenham Hotspur and Stoke City's long spells in the First Division came to an end with relegation. Stoke sacked their manager Tony Waddington. On the last day of the season, with three teams hoping to avoid the last relegation place, Coventry City and Bristol City played out a controversial 2–2 draw. The kick-off had been delayed for fifteen minutes by Coventry chairman Jimmy Hill due to "crowd congestion". With ten minutes still to play, and the sides level, play virtually stopped when it was announced over the public address system that Sunderland had lost to Everton. Both clubs survived while Sunderland was relegated.

Pos	Team	Pld	W	D	L	GF	GA	GD	Pts	Qualification or relegation
1	Liverpool (C)	42	23	11	8	62	33	+29	57	Qualification for the European Cup second round
2	Manchester City	42	21	14	7	60	34	+26	56	Qualification for the UEFA Cup first round
3	Ipswich Town	42	22	8	12	66	39	+27	52	Qualification for the UEFA Cup first round
4	Aston Villa	42	22	7	13	76	50	+26	51	Qualification for the UEFA Cup first round
5	Newcastle United	42	18	13	11	64	49	+15	49	Qualification for the UEFA Cup first round
6	Manchester United	42	18	11	13	71	62	+9	47	Qualification for the European Cup Winners' Cup first round (Note: Manchester United qualified for the European Cup Winners' Cup first round as the 1976–77 FA Cup winners.)
7	West Bromwich Albion	42	16	13	13	62	56	+6	45	
8	Arsenal	42	16	11	15	64	59	+5	43	
9	Everton	42	14	14	14	62	64	−2	42	
10	Leeds United	42	15	12	15	48	51	−3	42	
11	Leicester City	42	12	18	12	47	60	−13	42	
12	Middlesbrough	42	14	13	15	40	45	−5	41	
13	Birmingham City	42	13	12	17	63	61	+2	38	
14	Queens Park Rangers	42	13	12	17	47	52	−5	38	
15	Derby County	42	9	19	14	50	55	−5	37	
16	Norwich City	42	14	9	19	47	64	−17	37	
17	West Ham United	42	11	14	17	46	65	−19	36	
18	Bristol City	42	11	13	18	38	48	−10	35	
19	Coventry City	42	10	15	17	48	59	−11	35	
20	Sunderland (R)	42	11	12	19	46	54	−8	34	Relegation to the Second Division
21	Stoke City (R)	42	10	14	18	28	51	−23	34	Relegation to the Second Division
22	Tottenham Hotspur (R)	42	12	9	21	48	72	−24	33	Relegation to the Second Division

Source: World Football
Rules for classification: 1) Points; 2) Goal difference; 3) Goals scored
(C) Champions; (R) Relegated

=== Second Division ===
Wolves sealed an instant return to the First Division as champions of the Second Division. They were joined by Chelsea, back in the First Division after two seasons away, and by Brian Clough's ambitious Nottingham Forest side. Bolton Wanderers and Blackpool stayed down by a single point.

Hereford United, Plymouth Argyle and Carlisle United were relegated to the Third Division. Hereford became the first club to finish bottom of the Second Division after winning the Third Division the previous season.

Pos	Team	Pld	W	D	L	GF	GA	GD	Pts	Qualification or relegation
1	Wolverhampton Wanderers (C, P)	42	22	13	7	84	45	+39	57	Promotion to the First Division
2	Chelsea (P)	42	21	13	8	73	53	+20	55	Promotion to the First Division
3	Nottingham Forest (P)	42	21	10	11	77	43	+34	52	Promotion to the First Division
4	Bolton Wanderers	42	20	11	11	75	54	+21	51	
5	Blackpool	42	17	17	8	58	42	+16	51	
6	Luton Town	42	21	6	15	67	48	+19	48	
7	Charlton Athletic	42	16	16	10	71	58	+13	48	
8	Notts County	42	19	10	13	65	60	+5	48	
9	Southampton	42	17	10	15	72	67	+5	44	
10	Millwall	42	15	13	14	57	53	+4	43	
11	Sheffield United	42	14	12	16	54	63	−9	40	
12	Blackburn Rovers	42	15	9	18	42	54	−12	39	
13	Oldham Athletic	42	14	10	18	52	64	−12	38	
14	Hull City	42	10	17	15	45	53	−8	37	
15	Bristol Rovers	42	12	13	17	53	68	−15	37	
16	Burnley	42	11	14	17	46	64	−18	36	
17	Fulham	42	11	13	18	54	61	−7	35	
18	Cardiff City	42	12	10	20	56	67	−11	34	Qualification for the Cup Winners' Cup first round
19	Orient	42	9	16	17	37	55	−18	34	
20	Carlisle United (R)	42	11	12	19	49	75	−26	34	Relegation to the Third Division
21	Plymouth Argyle (R)	42	8	16	18	46	65	−19	32	Relegation to the Third Division
22	Hereford United (R)	42	8	15	19	57	78	−21	31	Relegation to the Third Division

Rules for classification: 1) Points; 2) Goal difference; 3) Goals scored
(C) Champions; (P) Promoted; (R) Relegated

=== Third Division ===
Mansfield Town won the Third Division title to seal a second promotion in three seasons. Alan Mullery guided Brighton to promotion. The last promotion place was sealed by Crystal Palace, where Terry Venables was enjoying a dream start to his managerial career. Rotherham United stayed down on goal difference, while Wrexham missed out by a single point.

Sheffield Wednesday progressed to an eighth-place finish after almost slipping into the Fourth Division a year earlier, while Lincoln City finished ninth. Manager Graham Taylor was subject of interest by a number of First and Second Division clubs, but ended up leaving Sincil Bank to drop into the Fourth Division and take over at Watford, who had just been taken over by Elton John.

York City, Northampton Town and Reading fell into the Fourth Division along with Grimsby Town who entered administration.

Pos	Team	Pld	W	D	L	GF	GA	GD	Pts	Promotion or relegation
1	Mansfield Town (C, P)	46	28	8	10	78	42	+36	64	Promotion to the Second Division
2	Brighton & Hove Albion (P)	46	25	11	10	83	40	+43	61	Promotion to the Second Division
3	Crystal Palace (P)	46	23	13	10	68	40	+28	59	Promotion to the Second Division
4	Rotherham United	46	22	15	9	69	44	+25	59	
5	Wrexham	46	24	10	12	80	54	+26	58	
6	Preston North End	46	21	12	13	64	43	+21	54	
7	Bury	46	23	8	15	64	59	+5	54	
8	Sheffield Wednesday	46	22	9	15	65	55	+10	53	
9	Lincoln City	46	19	14	13	77	70	+7	52	
10	Shrewsbury Town	46	18	11	17	65	59	+6	47	
11	Swindon Town	46	15	15	16	68	75	−7	45	
12	Gillingham	46	16	12	18	55	64	−9	44	
13	Chester	46	18	8	20	48	58	−10	44	
14	Tranmere Rovers	46	13	17	16	51	53	−2	43	
15	Walsall	46	13	15	18	57	65	−8	41	
16	Peterborough United	46	13	15	18	55	65	−10	41	
17	Oxford United	46	12	15	19	55	65	−10	39	
18	Chesterfield	46	14	10	22	56	64	−8	38	
19	Port Vale	46	11	16	19	47	71	−24	38	
20	Portsmouth	46	11	14	21	53	70	−17	36	
21	Reading (R)	46	13	9	24	49	73	−24	35	Relegation to the Fourth Division
22	Northampton Town (R)	46	13	8	25	60	75	−15	34	Relegation to the Fourth Division
23	Grimsby Town (R)	46	12	9	25	45	69	−24	33	Relegation to the Fourth Division
24	York City (R)	46	10	12	24	50	89	−39	32	Relegation to the Fourth Division

Source: rsssf.com
(C) Champions; (P) Promoted; (R) Relegated

=== Fourth Division ===
Cambridge United won the Fourth Division title under the management of Ron Atkinson, lifting them into the Third Division. Also promoted were Exeter City, Colchester United and Bradford City. Swansea City missed out on promotion by a single point.

A terrible season for Workington resulted in them having to apply for re-election to the Football League for the fourth season in succession, and this caused their fellow clubs to finally run out of patience and vote to end their membership of the League, a humiliation which saw them slip into the Northern Premier League. In their place were Southern League champions Wimbledon, who would make amazing progress over the next decade.

The British pop star Elton John took over Fourth Division side Watford and installed Graham Taylor as manager at the end of the season. Former Arsenal manager Bertie Mee came out of retirement to work at Watford as Taylor's assistant. John immediately asserted his ambition by promising to bring First Division football to Watford.

Pos	Team	Pld	W	D	L	GF	GA	GD	Pts	Promotion or relegation
1	Cambridge United (C, P)	46	26	13	7	87	40	+47	65	Promotion to the Third Division
2	Exeter City (P)	46	25	12	9	70	46	+24	62	Promotion to the Third Division
3	Colchester United (P)	46	25	9	12	77	43	+34	59	Promotion to the Third Division
4	Bradford City (P)	46	23	13	10	78	51	+27	59	Promotion to the Third Division
5	Swansea City	46	25	8	13	92	68	+24	58	
6	Barnsley	46	23	9	14	62	39	+23	55	
7	Watford	46	18	15	13	67	50	+17	51	
8	Doncaster Rovers	46	21	9	16	71	65	+6	51	
9	Huddersfield Town	46	19	12	15	60	49	+11	50	
10	Southend United	46	15	19	12	52	45	+7	49	
11	Darlington	46	18	13	15	59	64	−5	49	
12	Crewe Alexandra	46	19	11	16	47	60	−13	49	
13	Bournemouth	46	15	18	13	54	44	+10	48	
14	Stockport County	46	13	19	14	53	57	−4	45	
15	Brentford	46	18	7	21	77	76	+1	43	
16	Torquay United	46	17	9	20	59	67	−8	43	
17	Aldershot	46	16	11	19	49	59	−10	43	
18	Rochdale	46	13	12	21	50	59	−9	38	
19	Newport County	46	14	10	22	42	58	−16	38	
20	Scunthorpe United	46	13	11	22	49	73	−24	37	
21	Halifax Town	46	11	14	21	47	58	−11	36	Re-elected
22	Hartlepool	46	10	12	24	47	73	−26	32	Re-elected
23	Southport	46	3	19	24	33	77	−44	25	Re-elected
24	Workington (R)	46	4	11	31	41	102	−61	19	Failed re-election and demoted to the Northern Premier League

(C) Champions; (P) Promoted; (R) Relegated

=== Top goalscorers ===
First Division

- Andy Gray (Aston Villa), Malcolm Macdonald (Arsenal) – 25 goals

Second Division

- Mickey Walsh (Blackpool) – 26 goals

Third Division

- Peter Ward (Brighton & Hove Albion) – 32 goals

Fourth Division

- Brian Joicey (Barnsley) – 25 goals

== Non-league football ==
Competition	Winners
Isthmian League	Enfield
Northern Premier League	Boston United
Southern League	Wimbledon
FA Trophy	Scarborough
FA Vase	Billericay Town

== Star players ==
- Aston Villa's exciting young striker Andy Gray finished the season with a League Cup winners medal as well as being voted PFA Players' Player of the Year and PFA Young Player of the Year.
- Liverpool captain Emlyn Hughes added the FWA Footballer of the Year award to his league championship and European Cup winners medals.
- Manchester United's FA Cup winners included promising young players Steve Coppell and Arthur Albiston.
- Fulham's Football League Second Division team starred ex Manchester United player George Best alongside ex Queens Park Rangers player Rodney Marsh

== Star managers ==
- Bob Paisley retained Liverpool's league title and guided them to their first European Cup triumph.
- Tommy Docherty ended Manchester United's 14-year wait for the FA Cup and delivered their first trophy of the post-Matt Busby era.
- Ron Saunders delivered another League Cup victory for Aston Villa.
- Brian Clough guided Nottingham Forest to promotion to the First Division.

== Deaths ==
- 22 October 1976 – Willie Hamilton, 38, former Scottish international forward who had played for Sheffield United, Middlesbrough and Aston Villa as well as several Scottish clubs. Died in Canada as a result of a heart attack.
- 20 March 1977 – Peter Houseman, 31, Oxford United midfielder who had previously played for Chelsea when they won the F.A Cup in 1970 and the Cup Winners Cup a year later. Houseman died in a car crash near Oxford. His wife also died in the crash.
- 18 May 1977 - Tony Aveyard, 21, Scarborough winger, died in hospital after collapsing as a result of a head injury in a Northern Premier League fixture two days earlier.
