= Len Bond =

English footballer

Personal information
- Full name: Leonard Allan Bond
- Date of birth: 12 February 1954 (age 72)
- Place of birth: Barrington, Somerset, England
- Position: Goalkeeper

Youth career
- 1969–1971: Bristol City

Senior career*
Years	Team	Apps	(Gls)
1971–1976	Bristol City	30	(0)
1974–1975	→ Exeter (loan)	30	(0)
1975	→ Torquay United (loan)	3	(0)
1975–1976	→ Scunthorpe United (loan)	8	(0)
1976	→ Colchester United (loan)	3	(0)
1976	→ St. Louis Stars	15	(0)
1977–1980	Brentford	122	(0)
1980–1984	Exeter	138	(0)
- Yeovil Town
198?–1987	Weymouth		
1987–1988	Bath City	34	(0)
1988–1991	Yeovil Town		
1990–1991	→ Gloucester City (loan)		
- * Club domestic league appearances and goals

Len Bond (born 2 December 1954) is an English former professional football goalkeeper. He made more than 300 appearances in the Football League, including 168 for Exeter City and 122 for Brentford.

== Career ==
Bond was born in Ilminster, Somerset. He began his career as an apprentice with Bristol City, turning professional in September 1971, although he had made his league debut on the last day of the previous season. He remained at Ashton Gate for a further six years, most of which was spent as deputy to John Shaw or Ray Cashley. In November 1974 he was loaned to Exeter City, playing 30 league games.

The following season, he was loaned three times, to Torquay United in October 1975, to Scunthorpe United in December 1975, and to Colchester United in January 1976, before joining NASL side St. Louis Stars on loan for the 1976 season. Finally, in August 1977, after 30 league games for Bristol City, Bond moved to Brentford, where he was to find regular first-team football, playing 130 games in the next 3 years.

In October 1980 he returned to the south-west, joining Exeter City, playing 138 league games before leaving league football, and joining Yeovil Town. He later joined Weymouth from where he moved to Bath City in October 1987 for a fee of £2,000. He was ever-present for the rest of the season, but chose to return to Yeovil Town after City's relegation from the Conference at the end of the season.

He remained with Yeovil until his retirement, although did have a loan spell with Gloucester City from November 1990 and played three games for them the following season. Soon after his retirement, a chance meeting with Alan Ball led to him becoming goalkeeping coach at Exeter City, while also running a newsagents in Exeter. He subsequently worked as a coach at a number of clubs before coaching in the United States. He returned to the UK and worked with a number of clubs as well as coaching the FA's Youth Academy. He spent three years as goalkeeping coach with Bristol City's Youth Academy before another spell coaching in the United States.

On his return he coached at Exeter City and Torquay United before returning as goalkeeping coach to Yeovil Town. He then joined Bristol Rovers as goalkeeping coach. In 2011 Bond left Yeovil Town to concentrate on his sportswear business.

== Honours ==
Brentford

- Football League Fourth Division fourth-place promotion: 1977–78

Individual

- Brentford Players' Player of the Year: 1978–79
