= John Shaw (footballer, born 1954) =

Scottish footballer

Personal information
- Date of birth: 4 February 1954 (age 72)
- Place of birth: Stirling, Scotland
- Height: 6 ft 1 in (1.85 m)
- Position: Goalkeeper

Youth career
- 1969–1971: Leeds United

Senior career*
Years	Team	Apps	(Gls)
1971–1974	Leeds United	2	(0)
1974–1985	Bristol City	295	(0)
1985–1988	Exeter City	109	(0)
1988–1989	Gloucester City	68	(0)
Total		474	(0)
- * Club domestic league appearances and goals

John Shaw (born 4 February 1954) is a Scottish former footballer who played as a goalkeeper. He made over 400 Football League appearances in the 1970s and 1980s.

== Career ==
John Shaw played youth football with Leeds United. Shaw signed professional for Leeds United in February 1971. Shaw gained first team experience in the UEFA Cup with Leeds United, notably in a 0–4 defeat at home to Lierse S. K. of Belgium, but never appeared in the Football League for the club. He married the love of his life, Jean, and moved south. Alan Dicks signed Shaw in May 1974 on a free transfer from Leeds United for Bristol City. Jimmy Mann made the same move at the same time.

John Shaw had to wait in line behind regular goalkeeper Ray Cashley who was ever present in 1974–75 and again in 1975–76 when Bristol City finished runners up in the Second Division and won promotion back into the First Division after a wait of 65 years since 1911. However Shaw did make two substitute appearances in the Anglo Scottish Cup in August 1975. Cashley started in goal in season 1976–77 in the First Division before Len Bond was given a chance with two games but was injured so John Shaw finally made his League debut in goal for Bristol City in a 0–1 defeat v Birmingham City on 26 October 1976. This was the start of a run of 103 successive league appearances for Shaw. Bristol City hovered around the relegation places throughout their first season back in the First Division. Lying bottom in 22nd place with four games to go they managed two wins and two draws to finish 18th. The final game at Coventry City ended in a 2–2 draw which was enough to save both teams from relegation with the ball hardly leaving the centre circle during the last 15 minutes of the game. Shaw made 33 appearances in 1976–77. John Shaw was the only ever present City player in 1977–78 with 42 appearances as the "Robins" rose to 17th in the table. Shaw also played in all nine Anglo Scottish cup ties culminating in a two legged final 3–2 aggregate win over St Mirren in December 1977. It was during this period that John Shaw was spoken of as a possible replacement for Alan Rough in the Scotland full international team; but despite his splendid form the call to international duty never came.

With Bristol City rising to 13th place in the First Division in 1978–79 John Shaw started the season in the team and missed only two games making 40 appearances. John Shaw was initially chosen as no.1 again in season 1979–80 which ended with relegation in 20th place to the Second Division. Shaw played in the first 27 league games but was replaced by Ray Cashley after a run of ten matches conceding 22 goals without a win. Shaw made 28 appearances in 1979–80 and also played in 8 of the 9 Anglo Scottish Cup ties which ended in an aggregate 1–5 defeat to St Mirren in the final. Back in the Second Division in 1980–81 Bristol City finished 21st and were relegated on downwards to the Third Division. Cashley began the season in goal before John Shaw was given his chance in December at Shrewsbury Town where City lost 0–4. The signing of Jan Möller later in December restricted Shaw to making 5 appearances in 1980–81.

Bristol City suffered a third successive relegation in 1981–82 but very nearly failed to survive a mid season financial crisis in February 1982 when only a last minute acceptance of redundancy by the "Ashton Gate Eight" saved the club from potential extinction. Moller began the momentous season in goal but was a further victim of the crisis leaving the club after which Shaw took over in March making 15 appearances. This was the start of another long run of 124 successive league appearances by John Shaw. Down in the Fourth Division in 1982–83 John Shaw was the only ever present with 46 appearances as Bristol City finished in 14th place. Shaw was ever present in goal again in 1983–84 when Bristol City won promotion back to the Third Division by finishing in 4th place conceding only 44 goals the second best record in the division. Shaw made 41 appearances in the Third Division in 1984–85 as Bristol City narrowly missed another promotion finishing in 5th place. Bristol City played a benefit match for John Shaw v West Bromwich Albion on 13 May 1985 before a crowd of 1,950 fans. Shaw left Bristol City and moved on to Exeter City in July 1985. After three seasons with Exeter City Shaw joined Gloucester City of the Southern League in 1988.

John Shaw overcame the loss of his hair due to alopecia while at Bristol City. Shaw's unquenchable spirit in the face of adversity won widespread admiration, and he joked about his baldness with teammates telling them: "You try playing behind the City defence for 11 years and see what you'd look like!".

== Honours ==
Bristol City

- Anglo Scottish Cup winner: 1977–78
- Anglo Scottish Cup runner up: 1979–80
- Football League Fourth Division 4th place: 1983–84
