= Pertti Jantunen =

Finnish footballer and manager (born 1952)

Personal information
- Date of birth: 25 June 1952 (age 74)
- Place of birth: Lahti, Finland
- Height: 1.74 m (5 ft 8 1/2 in)
- Position: Midfielder

Senior career*
Years	Team	Apps	(Gls)
1971–1977	Reipas Lahti	121	(28)
1977	CD Málaga	14	(0)
1978	IFK Eskilstuna	24	(3)
1979–1980	Bristol City	8	(1)
1980	Reipas Lahti	13	(0)
1981–1983	Västerås SK	65	(6)
1984–1989	Reipas Lahti	98	(9)
1990–1991	Peli-Karhut	33	(2)

International career
1975–1978	Finland	26	(1)

Managerial career
- 1999: Pallo-Lahti
- 2003–2006: City Stars
- 2010–2013: MPS (women)
- * Club domestic league appearances and goals

Pertti Jantunen, born 25 June 1952, is a Finnish football manager and a former footballer.

== Club career ==
Jantunen played for Reipas Lahti in the Finnish premier division Mestaruussarja before joining CD Málaga in 1977 as the first ever Finnish footballer in Spain. In 1979, he was signed by Bristol City. Jantunen was the first Finn playing the top level in England. He also played for IFK Eskilstuna and Västerås SK in Sweden.

== International career ==
Jantunen was capped 26 times for Finland, making his international debut in September 1975 against the Netherlands in Nijmegen.
