= Harold Shepherdson =

English footballer, coach, and manager

Harold Shepherdson MBE
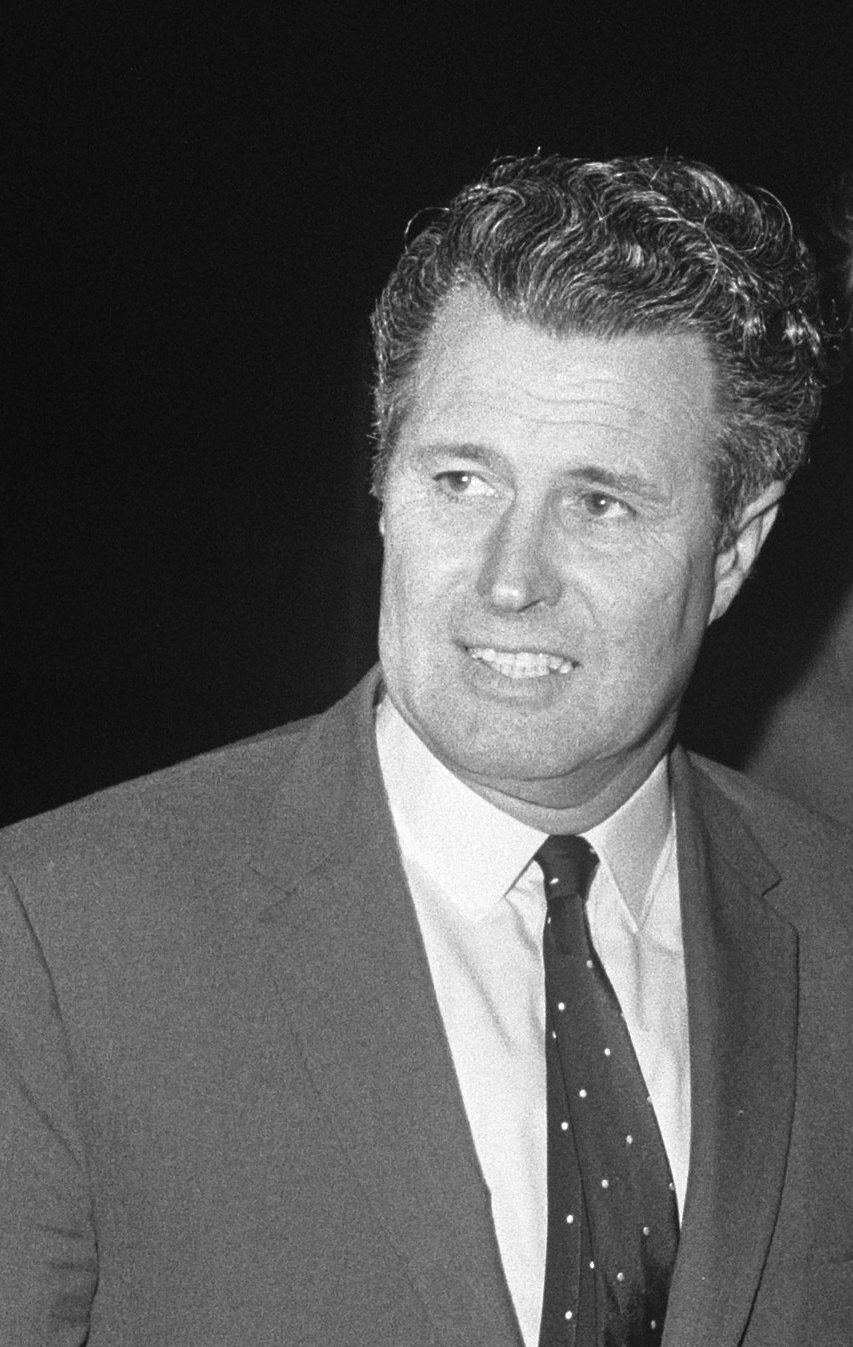
- Shepherdson in 1969

Personal information
- Full name: Harold Shepherdson
- Date of birth: 28 October 1918
- Place of birth: Middlesbrough, England
- Date of death: 13 September 1995 (aged 76)
- Place of death: Middlesbrough, England
- Position: Centre half

Youth career
- Middlesbrough

Senior career*
Years	Team	Apps	(Gls)
- South Bank
1936–1947	Middlesbrough	17	(0)
1947	Southend United	0	(0)

Managerial career
- 1966: Middlesbrough (caretaker)
- 1973: Middlesbrough (caretaker)
- 1977: Middlesbrough (caretaker)
- 1982: Middlesbrough (caretaker)
- * Club domestic league appearances and goals

Harold Shepherdson MBE (28 October 1918 – 13 September 1995) was an English football player, coach and manager.

Born in Middlesbrough, Shepherdson signed for his hometown club in 1936, but saw his playing career interrupted by the Second World War and ultimately made just 17 league appearances.

He is most notable for having been Alf Ramsey's long-term assistant as England manager, including during the successful 1966 World Cup campaign. Shepherdson also had four spells as caretaker manager at Middlesbrough.

Shepherdson was appointed Member of the Order of the British Empire (MBE) in the 1969 Birthday Honours.

Originally, only the eleven players who featured in the 4–2 win over West Germany in the 1966 World Cup final received medals. Following a Football Association led campaign to persuade FIFA to award medals to every non-playing squad and staff member, Margaret Shepherdson received a medal on behalf of her late husband from Gordon Brown at a ceremony at 10 Downing Street on 10 June 2009.

The flyover road leading to Middlesbrough's Riverside Stadium was named Shepherdson Way in honour of his contribution to the club.
