= Kevin Mabbutt =

English footballer

Personal information
- Date of birth: 5 December 1958 (age 67)
- Place of birth: Bristol, England
- Position: Striker

Youth career
- Bristol City

Senior career*
Years	Team	Apps	(Gls)
1977–1981	Bristol City	129	(29)
1981–1985	Crystal Palace	75	(22)

International career
1974	England Schoolboys	7	(3)
1977	England Youth	5	(0)
- * Club domestic league appearances and goals

Kevin Mabbutt (born 5 December 1958) is an English retired footballer who played for Bristol City and Crystal Palace in the Football League.

He played over 100 league games for Bristol City, before joining Crystal Palace in October 1981 in exchange for Terry Boyle. He was their top scorer that season, with eight goals, and helped them avoid a second successive relegation.

He came to national attention on 21 October 1978 when he scored 3 goals for Bristol City in a 3–1 win over Manchester United at Old Trafford. He remains one of only a handful of opposing players to have scored a hat-trick at the home of Manchester United.

His father is Ray Mabbutt and his brother is Gary Mabbutt.

As of 2005 he owns a restaurant in Los Angeles.
