= Clive Whitehead =

English footballer

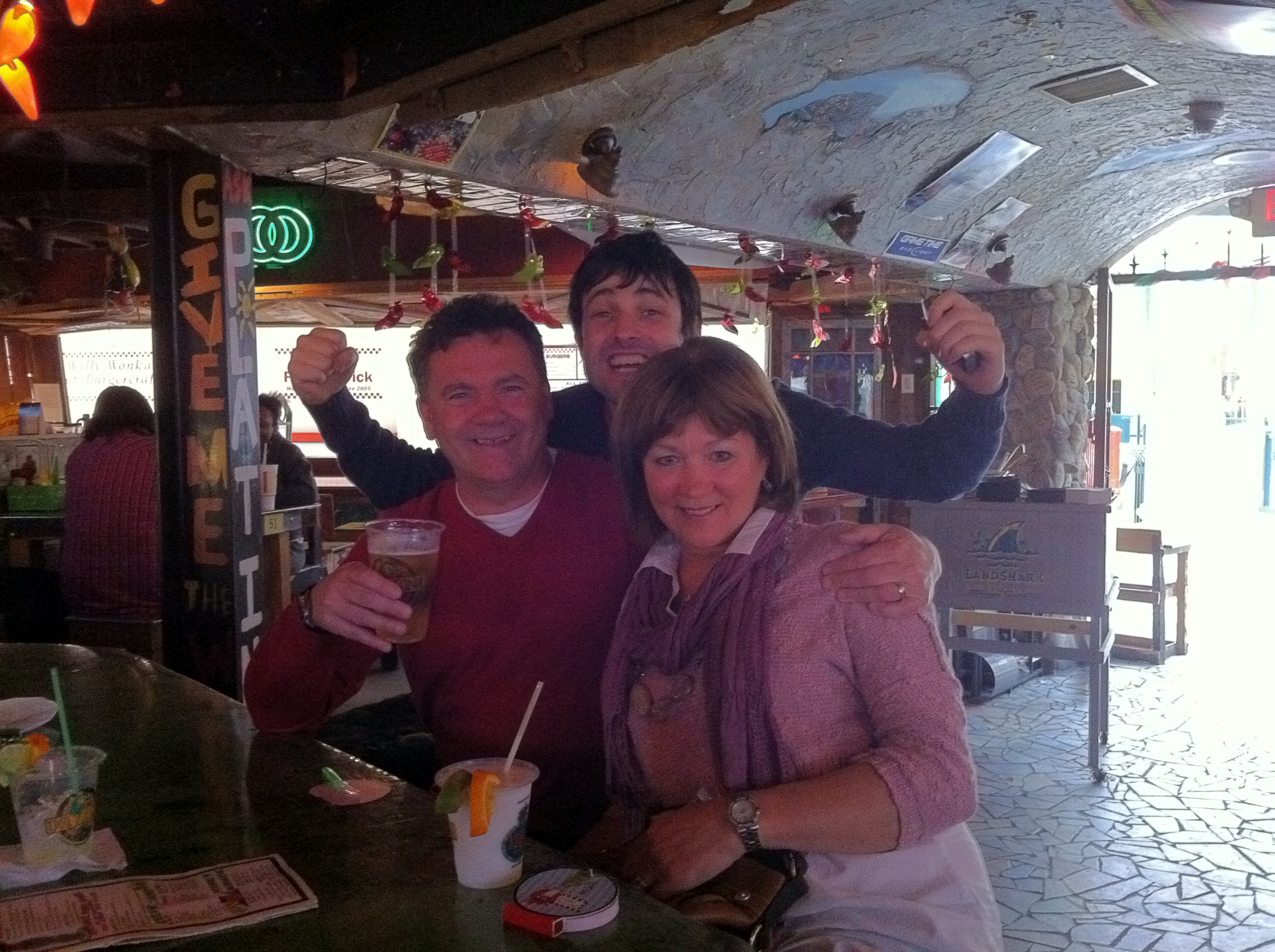

Personal information
- Full name: Clive Robert Whitehead
- Date of birth: 24 November 1955 (age 70)
- Place of birth: Northfield, Birmingham, England
- Height: 5 ft 11 in (1.80 m)
- Position: Utility player

Youth career
- 1973: Bristol City

Senior career*
Years	Team	Apps	(Gls)
1973–1981	Bristol City	229	(10)
1981–1987	West Bromwich Albion	168	(6)
1986	→ Wolves (loan)	2	(0)
1987–1989	Portsmouth	65	(2)
1989–1990	Exeter City	46	(5)
1990–1991	Yeovil Town	?	(?)

International career
1973	England Youth	2	(1)

Managerial career
- 1990–1991: Yeovil Town (player-manager)
- * Club domestic league appearances and goals

Clive Robert Whitehead (born 24 November 1955) is an English former footballer.

== Life and career ==
Whitehead was born in Northfield, Birmingham. He played for Bordesley Green Boys and Northfield Juniors during his youth and had a trial with Wolverhampton Wanderers in 1971. In March 1973, he joined Bristol City and became a professional with the club five months later. He scored the winning goal to help the club achieve promotion from the Second Division in 1975–76. Whitehead was transferred to West Bromwich Albion in November 1981, for a fee of £100,000, and made his debut for his new club away at Tottenham Hotspur in a First Division match. During the 1985–86 season he was loaned to Albion's local rivals Wolverhampton Wanderers. He joined Portsmouth on a free transfer in July 1987 and remained with the club until another free transfer to Exeter City in July 1989. A move to Yeovil Town followed in October 1990, with Whitehead taking up the role of player-manager, but he was dismissed from the position in April 1991. He then worked as an academy coach and scout at his former club Bristol City. He flirted with the idea of becoming the clubs first ever Community Officer, and later as a football agent and referee's assessor.

Whitehead's older brother Alan also played professional football.

== Honours ==
Exeter City

- Football League Fourth Division: 1989–90
