= Ray Cashley =

English footballer

Personal information
- Full name: Alec Raymond Cashley
- Date of birth: 23 October 1951 (age 75)
- Place of birth: Bristol, England
- Position: Goalkeeper

Youth career
- Bristol City

Senior career*
Years	Team	Apps	(Gls)
1970–1981	Bristol City	227	(1)
1981	→ Hereford United (loan)	20	(0)
- Clevedon Town
1982–1985	Bristol Rovers	53	(0)
1985	Trowbridge Town		
1985–1986	Chester City	9	(0)
1986–?	East Worle		
- Weston-super-Mare
- * Club domestic league appearances and goals as of 08:23, 14 January 2009 (UTC)

Alec Raymond "Ray" Cashley (born 23 October 1951 in Bristol, England) is an English former professional football goalkeeper.

He joined Bristol City as a youth player and was their number one goalkeeper in the early 1970s despite starting his career as a fullback. He made his debut for Bristol City against Southampton in the FA Cup in 1970. In the 1975–76 season, City were promoted to the First Division but Cashley lost his place to John Shaw soon afterwards and had only brief spells in the side for the remainder of his time with City. Cashley even scored a goal for City on 18 September 1973, with a long clearance from his own penalty area against Hull City on a gusty night. In total, he made 262 appearances, 227 of those in the league for The Robins.

Cashley had a loan spell with Hereford United in 1981, making 20 league and 6 additional appearances for The Whites before playing for Clevedon Town.

In August 1982, he returned to professional football with Bristol Rovers, who he made 53 league appearances for. He then played for Trowbridge Town before again returning to The Football League when he joined Chester City in October 1985. Cashley made nine appearances as City were promoted from Division Four at the end of the season.

After Chester, City came calling yet again, offering Cashley a role in the reserves, albeit without a contract. He would be able to step in to play for City if Keith Waugh was unable and Cashley jumped at the chance for full-time football once again.

He subsequently played for non-league sides East Worle and Weston-super-Mare.
