= Donnie Gillies =

Scottish footballer

Personal information
- Full name: Donald George Gillies
- Date of birth: 20 June 1951
- Place of birth: Glencoe, Scotland
- Position: Full back

Youth career
- Inverness Clachnacuddin

Senior career*
Years	Team	Apps	(Gls)
1971–1973	Morton	47	(23)
1973–1980	Bristol City	200	(26)
1980–1982	Bristol Rovers	59	(0)
1982–19??	Paulton Rovers	??	(?)
19??–19??	Gloucester City	??	(?)
19??–19??	Bath City	??	(?)
19??–19??	Trowbridge Town	??	(?)
19??–19??	Anorthosis	??	(?)
19??–19??	Trowbridge Town	??	(?)
1986–1987	Yeovil Town	??	(?)
19??–19??	Clutton		
Total		306	(49)

International career
1974	Scotland under-23	1	(0)
- * Club domestic league appearances and goals

Donald George Gillies (born 20 June 1951) is a Scottish former footballer, who played initially as a forward but latterly as a right back. He made over 230 Football League appearances and 45 Scottish League appearances in the 1970s.

== Career ==
A product of the Scottish Highland Football League, Gillies first professional club was Inverness Clachnacuddin FC, of the Scottish Highland Football League. Gillies joined Greenock Morton in October 1971 and was twice top scorer. Alan Dicks signed Gillies for £30,000 in March 1973 from Morton for Bristol City. Steve Ritchie moved in the opposite direction to Morton. Gillies made his debut for Bristol City. Gillies joined his former "Robins" teammate, Terry Cooper then the manager, to Bristol Rovers for £50,000 in June 1980. Gillies subsequently played for several West Country clubs in the Western & Southern Leagues with a spell in Cyprus playing for Anorthosis.

After retiring from playing football, Gillies worked as a sales representative until the death of his wife in July 1990. In 1997 Gillies was still living locally at Temple Cloud to the South of Bristol.

== Honours ==
with Bristol City

- Football League Second Division runners up: 1975–76
- Anglo-Scottish Cup winners: 1977–78
