= 1976–77 Football League =

78th season of the Football League

The Football League
- Season: 1976–77
- Champions: Liverpool
- Relegated: Workington

The 1976–77 season was the 78th completed season of The Football League.

As of this season, goal difference (GD in league tables) was used to separate the clubs finishing level on points. The earlier system, used from the season 1894–95 until the 1975–76 had been the so-called goal average (goals scored divided by goals conceded), or more properly put, goal ratio. In case one or more teams had the same positive goal difference, this earlier system favoured those teams who had scored fewer goals. Now the system would favour the teams that had scored more goals, and it was hoped that more goals would be seen as a result of this new system.

The season was also the first in which the referee used the yellow card and the red card, with the yellow to caution the offending player, and the red to show spectators and viewers that the player had been ejected from the game. Writing in The Observer, sportswriter Bob Houston noted that the season opener was "the day the Football League went Continental, arming its referees with those coloured cards we've all learned to watch for in European and World Cup matches."

On 2 October 1976, Dave Wagstaffe of Blackburn Rovers became the first player in Football League history to be shown the red card when he was sent off in a 1-0 win over Orient in a Division 2 match.

== Overview ==
Liverpool retained their league championship trophy and won their first European Cup to confirm Bob Paisley as a successful replacement for Bill Shankly in his third season at the helm. Tottenham Hotspur and Stoke City's long spells in the First Division came to an end with relegation. Stoke sacked their manager Tony Waddington. On the last day of the season, Coventry City and Bristol City played out a controversial 2–2 draw, with play virtually stopping when it was heard that Sunderland had lost to Everton. Both clubs survived while Sunderland was relegated.

After Manchester United manager Tommy Docherty had admitted his affair with the wife of the club's physiotherapist, the club's directors decided that he had broken their moral code and he was sacked.

Wolverhampton Wanderers, Chelsea and Nottingham Forest gained promotion to the First Division. Brian Clough's Forest would achieve success beyond the dreams of most supporters over the next few seasons. Carlisle United, Plymouth Argyle and Hereford United occupied the three relegation places. Hereford became the first club to finish bottom of the Second Division after winning the Third Division the previous season.

Mansfield Town, Brighton & Hove Albion and Crystal Palace were the three teams promoted to the Second Division. Palace's manager was a certain Terry Venables who would enjoy more success at Palace and elsewhere over the next 20 years. Going down were Reading, Northampton Town, Grimsby Town and York City.

Cambridge United, Exeter City, Colchester United and Bradford City occupied the four promotion places in the league's lowest division. A terrible season for Workington was compounded by their failure to gain re-election to the Football League, a humiliation which saw them slip into the Northern Premier League. In their place were Southern League champions Wimbledon, who would make amazing progress over the next decade.

The British pop star Elton John took over Fourth Division side Watford and installed Graham Taylor as manager. Former Arsenal manager Bertie Mee came out of retirement to work at Watford as assistant to Graham Taylor. John immediately asserted his ambition by promising to bring First Division football to Watford.

== Final league tables and results ==
The tables and results below are reproduced here in the exact form that they can be found at The Rec.Sport.Soccer Statistics Foundation website and in Rothmans Book of Football League Records 1888–89 to 1978–79, with home and away statistics separated.

Beginning with the season 1894–95, clubs finishing level on points were separated according to goal average (goals scored divided by goals conceded), or more properly put, goal ratio. In case one or more teams had the same goal difference, this system favoured those teams who had scored fewer goals. The goal average system was eventually scrapped beginning with this season.

Re-election: During the first five seasons of the league, that is, until the season 1893–94, re-election process concerned the clubs which finished in the bottom four of the league. From the 1894–95 season and until the 1920–21 season the re-election process was required of the clubs which finished in the bottom three of the league. From the 1922–23 season on it was required of the bottom two teams of both Third Division North and Third Division South. Since the Fourth Division was established in the 1958–59 season, the re-election process has concerned the bottom four clubs in that division.

== First Division ==
First Division
- Season: 1976–77
- Champions: Liverpool; 10th English title
- Relegated: Sunderland; Stoke City; Tottenham Hotspur
- European Cup: Liverpool
- Cup Winners' Cup: Manchester United
- UEFA Cup: Aston Villa; Ipswich Town; Manchester City; Newcastle United
- Matches: 462
- Goals: 1,183 (2.56 per match)
- Top goalscorer: Andy Gray; Malcolm Macdonald (25 goals each)
- Biggest home win: Ipswich Town 7–0 West Bromwich Albion (6 November 1976)
- Biggest away win: Leicester City 0–5 West Bromwich Albion (7 May 1977)
- Highest scoring: Derby County 8–2 Tottenham Hotspur (16 October 1976)

Despite failing to win any of their final four matches, Liverpool retained the First Division title against a strong challenge by Manchester City and went on to win the European Cup for the first time, although their bid for a unique treble was ended when they lost to Manchester United in the final of the FA Cup. Liverpool finished a point ahead of Manchester City in the league. Ipswich Town, Aston Villa and Newcastle United completed the top five. Newly promoted West Bromwich Albion finished seventh.

Tottenham Hotspur went down in bottom place after a 27-year run in the First Division, along with Stoke City who had been in the First Division continuously since 1963. The final relegation place went to Sunderland, just one year after promotion.

Pos	Team	Pld	W	D	L	GF	GA	GD	Pts	Qualification or relegation
1	Liverpool (C)	42	23	11	8	62	33	+29	57	Qualification for the European Cup second round
2	Manchester City	42	21	14	7	60	34	+26	56	Qualification for the UEFA Cup first round
3	Ipswich Town	42	22	8	12	66	39	+27	52	Qualification for the UEFA Cup first round
4	Aston Villa	42	22	7	13	76	50	+26	51	Qualification for the UEFA Cup first round
5	Newcastle United	42	18	13	11	64	49	+15	49	Qualification for the UEFA Cup first round
6	Manchester United	42	18	11	13	71	62	+9	47	Qualification for the European Cup Winners' Cup first round (Note: Manchester United qualified for the European Cup Winners' Cup first round as the 1976–77 FA Cup winners.)
7	West Bromwich Albion	42	16	13	13	62	56	+6	45	
8	Arsenal	42	16	11	15	64	59	+5	43	
9	Everton	42	14	14	14	62	64	−2	42	
10	Leeds United	42	15	12	15	48	51	−3	42	
11	Leicester City	42	12	18	12	47	60	−13	42	
12	Middlesbrough	42	14	13	15	40	45	−5	41	
13	Birmingham City	42	13	12	17	63	61	+2	38	
14	Queens Park Rangers	42	13	12	17	47	52	−5	38	
15	Derby County	42	9	19	14	50	55	−5	37	
16	Norwich City	42	14	9	19	47	64	−17	37	
17	West Ham United	42	11	14	17	46	65	−19	36	
18	Bristol City	42	11	13	18	38	48	−10	35	
19	Coventry City	42	10	15	17	48	59	−11	35	
20	Sunderland (R)	42	11	12	19	46	54	−8	34	Relegation to the Second Division
21	Stoke City (R)	42	10	14	18	28	51	−23	34	Relegation to the Second Division
22	Tottenham Hotspur (R)	42	12	9	21	48	72	−24	33	Relegation to the Second Division

Source: World Football
Rules for classification: 1) Points; 2) Goal difference; 3) Goals scored
(C) Champions; (R) Relegated

=== Results ===
Home \ Away	ARS	AST	BIR	BRI	COV	DER	EVE	IPS	LEE	LEI	LIV	MCI	MUN	MID	NEW	NWC	QPR	STK	SUN	TOT	WBA	WHU
Arsenal		3–0	4–0	0–1	2–0	0–0	3–1	1–4	1–1	3–0	1–1	0–0	3–1	1–1	5–3	1–0	3–2	2–0	0–0	1–0	1–2	2–3
Aston Villa	5–1		1–2	3–1	2–2	4–0	2–0	5–2	2–1	2–0	5–1	1–1	3–2	1–0	2–1	1–0	1–1	1–0	4–1	2–1	4–0	4–0
Birmingham City	3–3	2–1		3–0	3–1	5–1	1–1	2–4	0–0	1–1	2–1	0–0	2–3	3–1	1–2	3–2	2–1	2–0	2–0	1–2	0–1	0–0
Bristol City	2–0	0–0	0–1		0–0	2–2	1–2	1–2	1–0	0–1	2–1	1–0	1–1	1–2	1–1	3–1	1–0	1–1	4–1	1–0	1–2	1–1
Coventry City	1–2	2–3	2–1	2–2		2–0	4–2	1–1	4–2	1–1	0–0	0–1	0–2	1–1	1–1	2–0	2–0	5–2	1–2	1–1	1–1	1–1
Derby County	0–0	2–1	0–0	2–0	1–1		2–3	0–0	0–1	1–0	2–3	4–0	0–0	0–0	4–2	2–2	2–0	2–0	1–0	8–2	2–2	1–1
Everton	2–1	0–2	2–2	2–0	1–1	2–0		1–1	0–2	1–2	0–0	2–2	1–2	2–2	2–0	3–1	1–3	3–0	2–0	4–0	1–1	3–2
Ipswich Town	3–1	1–0	1–0	1–0	2–1	0–0	2–0		1–1	0–0	1–0	1–0	2–1	0–1	2–0	5–0	2–2	0–1	3–1	3–1	7–0	4–1
Leeds United	2–1	1–3	1–0	2–0	1–2	2–0	0–0	2–1		2–2	1–1	0–2	0–2	2–1	2–2	3–2	0–1	1–1	1–1	2–1	2–2	1–1
Leicester City	4–1	1–1	2–6	0–0	3–1	1–1	1–1	1–0	0–1		0–1	2–2	1–1	3–3	1–0	1–1	2–2	1–0	2–0	2–1	0–5	2–0
Liverpool	2–0	3–0	4–1	2–1	3–1	3–1	3–1	2–1	3–1	5–1		2–1	1–0	0–0	1–0	1–0	3–1	4–0	2–0	2–0	1–1	0–0
Manchester City	1–0	2–0	2–1	2–1	2–0	3–2	1–1	2–1	2–1	5–0	1–1		1–3	1–0	0–0	2–0	0–0	0–0	1–0	5–0	1–0	4–2
Manchester United	3–2	2–0	2–2	2–1	2–0	3–1	4–0	0–1	1–0	1–1	0–0	3–1		2–0	3–1	2–2	1–0	3–0	3–3	2–3	2–2	0–2
Middlesbrough	3–0	3–2	2–2	0–0	1–0	2–0	2–2	0–2	1–0	0–1	0–1	0–0	3–0		1–0	1–0	0–2	0–0	2–1	2–0	1–0	1–1
Newcastle United	0–2	3–2	3–2	0–0	1–0	2–2	4–1	1–1	3–0	0–0	1–0	2–2	2–2	1–0		5–1	2–0	1–0	2–0	2–0	2–0	3–0
Norwich City	1–3	1–1	1–0	2–1	3–0	0–0	2–1	0–1	1–2	3–2	2–1	0–2	2–1	1–0	3–2		2–0	1–1	2–2	1–3	1–0	1–0
Queens Park Rangers	2–1	2–1	2–2	0–1	1–1	1–1	0–4	1–0	0–0	3–2	1–1	0–0	4–0	3–0	1–2	2–3		2–0	2–0	2–1	1–0	1–1
Stoke City	1–1	1–0	1–0	2–2	2–0	1–0	0–1	2–1	2–1	0–1	0–0	0–2	3–3	3–1	0–0	0–0	1–0		0–0	0–0	0–2	2–1
Sunderland	2–2	0–1	1–0	1–0	0–1	1–1	0–1	1–0	0–1	0–0	0–1	0–2	2–1	4–0	2–2	0–1	1–0	0–0		2–1	6–1	6–0
Tottenham Hotspur	2–2	3–1	1–0	0–1	0–1	0–0	3–3	1–0	1–0	2–0	1–0	2–2	1–3	0–0	0–2	1–1	3–0	2–0	1–1		0–2	2–1
West Bromwich Albion	0–2	1–1	2–1	1–1	1–1	1–0	3–0	4–0	1–2	2–2	0–1	0–2	4–0	2–1	1–1	2–0	1–1	3–1	2–3	4–2		3–0
West Ham United	0–2	0–1	2–2	2–0	2–0	2–2	2–2	0–2	1–3	0–0	2–0	1–0	4–2	0–1	1–2	1–0	1–0	1–0	1–1	5–3	0–0	

Updated to match(es) played on unknown. Source: Ian Laschke: Rothmans Book of Football League Records 1888–89 to 1978–79. Macdonald and Jane’s, London & Sydney, 1980.
Legend: Blue = home team win; Yellow = draw; Red = away team win.

=== Maps ===
Locations of the Football League First Division London teams 1976–1977
Locations of the Football League First Division 1976–1977 teams

== Second Division ==
Second Division
- Season: 1976–77
- Champions: Wolverhampton Wanderers
- Promoted: Wolverhampton Wanderers; Chelsea; Nottingham Forest
- Relegated: Carlisle United; Plymouth Argyle; Hereford United
- Cup Winners' Cup: Cardiff City
- Matches: 462
- Goals: 1,290 (2.79 per match)
- Top goalscorer: Mickey Walsh (26 goals)
- Biggest home win: Blackburn Rovers 6–1 Notts County (9 October 1976); Nottingham Forest 6–1 Sheffield United (9 October 1976); Fulham 5–0 Oldham Athletic (4 December 1976); Fulham 6–1 Orient (7 March 1977); Luton Town 5–0 Carlisle United (26 March 1977)
- Biggest away win: Carlisle United 0–6 Southampton (22 January 1977)
- Highest scoring: Charlton Athletic 6–2 Southampton (24 September 1976); Wolverhampton Wanderers 2–6 Southampton (5 October 1976); Burnley 4–4 Charlton Athletic (16 October 1976); Oldham Athletic 3–5 Hereford United (16 April 1977)

Wolverhampton Wanderers achieved an instant return to the First Division as champions of the Second Division, while runners-up Chelsea regained their top flight status two years after losing it. Brian Clough steered Nottingham Forest into the final promotion place, while Bolton Wanderers and Blackpool missed out by a single point.

Hereford United, Plymouth Argyle and Carlisle United went down to the Third Division.

Pos	Team	Pld	W	D	L	GF	GA	GD	Pts	Qualification or relegation
1	Wolverhampton Wanderers (C, P)	42	22	13	7	84	45	+39	57	Promotion to the First Division
2	Chelsea (P)	42	21	13	8	73	53	+20	55	Promotion to the First Division
3	Nottingham Forest (P)	42	21	10	11	77	43	+34	52	Promotion to the First Division
4	Bolton Wanderers	42	20	11	11	75	54	+21	51	
5	Blackpool	42	17	17	8	58	42	+16	51	
6	Luton Town	42	21	6	15	67	48	+19	48	
7	Charlton Athletic	42	16	16	10	71	58	+13	48	
8	Notts County	42	19	10	13	65	60	+5	48	
9	Southampton	42	17	10	15	72	67	+5	44	
10	Millwall	42	15	13	14	57	53	+4	43	
11	Sheffield United	42	14	12	16	54	63	−9	40	
12	Blackburn Rovers	42	15	9	18	42	54	−12	39	
13	Oldham Athletic	42	14	10	18	52	64	−12	38	
14	Hull City	42	10	17	15	45	53	−8	37	
15	Bristol Rovers	42	12	13	17	53	68	−15	37	
16	Burnley	42	11	14	17	46	64	−18	36	
17	Fulham	42	11	13	18	54	61	−7	35	
18	Cardiff City	42	12	10	20	56	67	−11	34	Qualification for the Cup Winners' Cup first round
19	Orient	42	9	16	17	37	55	−18	34	
20	Carlisle United (R)	42	11	12	19	49	75	−26	34	Relegation to the Third Division
21	Plymouth Argyle (R)	42	8	16	18	46	65	−19	32	Relegation to the Third Division
22	Hereford United (R)	42	8	15	19	57	78	−21	31	Relegation to the Third Division

Rules for classification: 1) Points; 2) Goal difference; 3) Goals scored
(C) Champions; (P) Promoted; (R) Relegated

=== Results ===
Home \ Away	BLB	BLP	BOL	BRR	BUR	CAR	CRL	CHA	CHE	FUL	HER	HUL	LUT	MIL	NOT	NTC	OLD	ORI	PLY	SHU	SOU	WOL
Blackburn Rovers		0–1	3–1	0–0	2–2	2–1	1–3	0–0	0–2	1–0	1–0	1–0	1–0	2–0	1–3	6–1	2–0	2–2	2–0	1–0	3–0	0–2
Blackpool	1–1		1–0	4–0	1–1	1–0	0–0	2–2	0–1	3–2	2–1	0–0	1–0	4–2	1–0	1–1	0–2	3–0	0–2	1–0	1–0	2–2
Bolton Wanderers	3–1	0–3		1–0	2–1	2–1	3–4	1–0	2–2	2–1	3–1	5–1	2–1	3–1	1–1	4–0	3–0	2–0	3–0	1–2	3–0	0–1
Bristol Rovers	0–0	1–4	2–2		1–1	1–1	2–1	1–1	2–1	2–1	2–3	3–0	1–0	0–0	1–1	5–1	0–0	1–0	1–1	3–1	2–3	1–5
Burnley	3–1	0–0	0–0	1–1		0–0	2–0	4–4	1–0	3–1	1–1	0–0	1–2	1–3	0–1	3–1	1–0	3–3	0–2	1–0	2–0	0–0
Cardiff City	2–1	2–2	3–2	1–2	0–1		1–1	1–1	1–3	3–0	3–1	1–1	4–2	0–0	0–3	2–3	3–1	0–1	0–1	0–2	1–0	2–2
Carlisle United	1–1	1–1	0–1	2–3	2–1	4–3		4–2	0–1	1–2	2–2	1–1	1–1	0–1	1–1	0–2	1–1	1–0	3–1	4–1	0–6	2–1
Charlton Athletic	4–0	1–2	1–1	4–3	5–2	0–2	1–0		4–0	1–1	1–1	3–1	4–3	3–2	2–1	1–1	2–1	2–0	3–1	3–2	6–2	1–1
Chelsea	3–1	2–2	2–1	2–0	2–1	2–1	2–1	2–1		2–0	5–1	4–0	2–0	1–1	2–1	1–1	4–3	1–1	2–2	4–0	3–1	3–3
Fulham	2–0	0–0	0–2	1–0	2–2	1–2	2–0	1–1	3–1		4–1	0–0	1–2	2–3	2–2	1–5	5–0	6–1	2–0	3–2	1–1	0–0
Hereford United	1–0	1–1	3–3	1–1	3–0	2–2	0–0	1–2	2–2	1–0		1–0	0–1	3–1	0–1	1–4	0–0	2–3	1–1	2–2	2–0	1–6
Hull City	1–0	2–2	2–2	0–1	4–1	1–2	3–1	0–0	1–1	1–0	1–1		3–1	0–0	1–0	0–1	0–1	1–1	3–1	1–1	4–0	2–0
Luton Town	2–0	0–0	1–1	4–2	2–0	2–1	5–0	2–0	4–0	0–2	2–0	2–1		1–2	1–1	4–2	1–0	0–0	1–1	2–0	1–4	2–0
Millwall	0–1	1–1	3–0	2–0	2–0	0–2	1–1	1–1	3–0	0–0	4–2	2–1	4–2		0–2	2–5	2–1	0–1	3–0	0–1	0–0	1–1
Nottingham Forest	3–0	3–0	3–1	4–2	5–2	0–1	5–1	1–1	1–1	3–0	4–3	2–0	1–2	1–0		1–2	3–0	3–0	1–1	6–1	2–1	1–3
Notts County	0–0	2–0	0–1	2–1	5–1	1–0	2–1	0–1	2–1	0–0	3–2	1–1	0–4	1–2	1–1		1–0	0–1	2–0	2–1	3–1	1–1
Oldham Athletic	2–0	1–0	2–2	4–0	3–1	3–2	4–1	1–1	0–0	1–0	3–5	3–0	1–2	2–1	1–0	1–1		0–0	2–2	1–2	2–1	0–2
Orient	0–1	0–1	2–2	2–0	0–1	3–0	0–0	0–0	0–1	0–0	1–1	1–1	1–0	1–1	0–1	1–0	0–2		2–2	0–2	2–3	2–4
Plymouth Argyle	4–0	2–0	1–1	1–1	0–1	2–2	0–1	1–0	2–3	2–2	2–1	1–2	1–0	2–2	1–2	1–2	2–2	1–2		0–0	1–1	0–0
Sheffield United	1–1	1–5	2–3	2–3	1–0	3–0	3–0	3–0	1–0	1–1	1–1	1–1	0–3	1–1	2–0	1–0	2–1	1–1	1–0		2–2	2–2
Southampton	2–0	3–3	1–3	2–1	2–0	3–2	1–2	2–1	1–1	4–1	1–0	2–2	1–0	0–2	1–1	2–1	4–0	2–2	4–1	1–1		1–0
Wolverhampton Wanderers	1–2	2–1	1–0	1–0	0–0	4–1	4–0	3–0	1–1	5–1	2–1	2–1	1–2	3–1	2–1	2–2	5–0	1–0	4–0	2–1	2–6	

Updated to match(es) played on unknown. Source: Ian Laschke: Rothmans Book of Football League Records 1888–89 to 1978–79. Macdonald and Jane’s, London & Sydney, 1980.
Legend: Blue = home team win; Yellow = draw; Red = away team win.

=== Maps ===
Locations of the Football League Second Division London teams 1976–1977
Locations of the Football League Second Division 1976–1977 teams

== Third Division ==
Football League Third Division
- Season: 1976–77
- Champions: Mansfield Town (1st title)
- Promoted: Brighton & Hove Albion; Crystal Palace
- Relegated: Grimsby Town; Northampton Town; Reading; York City
- Matches: 552
- Goals: 1,462 (2.65 per match)
- Top goalscorer: Peter Ward (Brighton & Hove Albion), 32

Pos	Team	Pld	W	D	L	GF	GA	GD	Pts	Promotion or relegation
1	Mansfield Town (C, P)	46	28	8	10	78	42	+36	64	Promotion to the Second Division
2	Brighton & Hove Albion (P)	46	25	11	10	83	40	+43	61	Promotion to the Second Division
3	Crystal Palace (P)	46	23	13	10	68	40	+28	59	Promotion to the Second Division
4	Rotherham United	46	22	15	9	69	44	+25	59	
5	Wrexham	46	24	10	12	80	54	+26	58	
6	Preston North End	46	21	12	13	64	43	+21	54	
7	Bury	46	23	8	15	64	59	+5	54	
8	Sheffield Wednesday	46	22	9	15	65	55	+10	53	
9	Lincoln City	46	19	14	13	77	70	+7	52	
10	Shrewsbury Town	46	18	11	17	65	59	+6	47	
11	Swindon Town	46	15	15	16	68	75	−7	45	
12	Gillingham	46	16	12	18	55	64	−9	44	
13	Chester	46	18	8	20	48	58	−10	44	
14	Tranmere Rovers	46	13	17	16	51	53	−2	43	
15	Walsall	46	13	15	18	57	65	−8	41	
16	Peterborough United	46	13	15	18	55	65	−10	41	
17	Oxford United	46	12	15	19	55	65	−10	39	
18	Chesterfield	46	14	10	22	56	64	−8	38	
19	Port Vale	46	11	16	19	47	71	−24	38	
20	Portsmouth	46	11	14	21	53	70	−17	36	
21	Reading (R)	46	13	9	24	49	73	−24	35	Relegation to the Fourth Division
22	Northampton Town (R)	46	13	8	25	60	75	−15	34	Relegation to the Fourth Division
23	Grimsby Town (R)	46	12	9	25	45	69	−24	33	Relegation to the Fourth Division
24	York City (R)	46	10	12	24	50	89	−39	32	Relegation to the Fourth Division

Source: rsssf.com
(C) Champions; (P) Promoted; (R) Relegated

=== Results ===
Home \ Away	B&HA	BRY	CHE	CHF	CRY	GIL	GRI	LIN	MAN	NOR	OXF	PET	POR	PTV	PNE	REA	ROT	SHW	SHR	SWI	TRA	WAL	WRE	YOR
Brighton & Hove Albion		1–1	3–0	2–1	1–1	2–0	3–0	4–0	3–1	2–0	3–2	1–0	4–0	1–0	2–0	2–0	3–1	3–2	4–0	4–0	1–1	7–0	0–2	7–2
Bury	3–0		2–0	3–1	0–1	3–1	2–0	3–0	2–0	1–1	2–1	4–1	1–0	3–0	3–2	1–0	1–1	1–3	0–1	0–1	2–1	0–2	0–2	4–2
Chester	0–1	1–0		1–2	2–1	1–0	2–0	1–0	1–0	2–1	1–3	2–1	1–1	1–1	0–0	3–1	1–3	1–0	1–2	2–1	1–0	1–0	1–2	1–0
Chesterfield	1–1	7–0	1–0		0–2	1–0	0–1	1–4	0–1	0–0	2–0	0–0	1–2	4–0	1–1	4–0	1–0	2–0	1–1	0–1	0–0	1–0	0–6	2–0
Crystal Palace	3–1	2–1	1–2	0–0		3–1	2–1	4–1	2–0	1–1	2–2	0–0	2–1	2–0	1–0	1–1	2–1	4–0	2–1	5–0	1–0	3–0	2–1	1–0
Gillingham	0–1	1–0	1–0	2–1	0–3		1–1	0–1	3–1	1–1	1–1	1–1	2–1	1–1	1–1	2–2	1–2	1–0	2–1	2–2	3–0	1–0	2–0	2–0
Grimsby Town	2–0	2–0	0–0	1–2	0–1	1–1		1–2	0–1	0–1	1–2	2–2	1–0	2–4	1–0	2–1	1–1	1–1	2–1	2–0	1–0	2–2	3–0	1–0
Lincoln City	2–2	2–3	3–3	3–2	3–2	4–0	2–0		3–2	5–4	0–1	1–1	2–1	2–0	2–0	3–1	2–2	1–1	1–1	0–0	2–2	4–1	1–1	2–0
Mansfield Town	1–1	5–0	1–1	2–1	1–0	2–2	3–0	3–1		3–0	3–0	1–1	2–0	2–1	3–1	4–0	3–1	1–0	1–0	1–1	1–1	3–0	2–0	4–1
Northampton Town	0–2	3–0	0–0	2–1	3–0	1–2	0–0	1–0	0–1		1–0	2–2	3–1	3–0	0–1	1–2	1–4	0–2	5–3	1–1	3–4	0–1	0–2	3–0
Oxford United	1–0	2–2	2–0	3–2	0–1	3–1	5–2	1–2	0–3	1–0		2–3	2–1	0–0	2–2	1–0	1–2	1–1	4–2	0–0	1–1	0–0	2–2	0–2
Peterborough United	2–0	0–1	3–2	0–3	0–0	0–1	3–1	1–2	2–1	3–1	2–0		4–2	1–1	0–0	2–1	0–2	1–2	2–1	1–0	0–0	3–5	0–2	3–0
Portsmouth	1–0	1–1	2–1	0–1	0–0	3–2	1–2	1–1	2–2	2–1	1–1	0–0		1–1	0–0	0–2	5–1	0–3	2–0	2–1	0–3	1–1	0–1	3–1
Port Vale	2–2	0–1	1–0	1–1	4–1	1–2	2–0	1–0	1–4	2–1	2–1	1–1	1–0		0–0	1–0	1–4	2–0	1–2	2–2	1–1	0–0	2–3	0–2
Preston North End	1–1	0–1	3–4	2–2	2–1	1–0	2–1	3–0	1–2	3–0	2–1	6–2	0–0	4–0		3–0	0–0	4–1	2–1	2–0	1–0	0–1	2–1	4–2
Reading	2–3	1–3	2–0	2–0	0–0	1–2	2–0	1–2	1–0	2–4	2–0	1–0	2–0	1–1	0–2		0–3	0–1	0–0	4–1	0–0	2–1	2–0	1–1
Rotherham United	0–0	3–0	1–1	1–0	1–1	1–0	3–2	1–0	3–0	2–0	1–1	0–0	2–2	1–1	2–0	1–2		0–1	1–0	1–1	1–2	1–0	2–0	1–1
Sheffield Wednesday	0–0	1–0	3–0	4–1	1–0	2–0	1–0	1–1	0–2	2–1	2–0	4–0	1–1	1–2	1–0	2–1	1–3		0–1	3–1	3–1	0–0	3–1	3–2
Shrewsbury Town	1–0	0–1	2–0	3–0	1–1	4–2	2–1	2–1	0–0	3–0	1–0	2–1	4–1	1–1	1–2	2–0	0–0	1–1		2–2	2–2	1–2	3–2	2–1
Swindon Town	2–1	0–1	2–1	3–0	1–1	2–2	4–1	2–2	0–1	5–1	1–0	0–4	4–3	1–0	0–1	2–2	2–4	5–2	1–0		1–1	2–2	3–2	5–1
Tranmere Rovers	1–3	1–2	0–1	2–1	1–0	2–0	2–0	2–2	4–0	2–1	1–1	2–0	1–3	1–1	0–0	2–1	0–1	1–0	2–1	0–1		0–0	0–0	4–4
Walsall	1–0	3–3	1–0	2–2	0–0	1–2	1–0	1–3	1–2	0–3	2–2	1–1	1–1	3–1	0–1	6–1	0–1	5–1	3–3	2–0	2–0		2–3	1–2
Wrexham	0–0	0–0	4–2	3–1	2–4	2–1	3–2	3–0	0–1	3–1	1–1	2–0	2–0	6–2	2–0	3–1	2–1	2–2	1–0	2–2	2–0	1–0		1–1
York City	0–1	2–2	0–2	2–1	2–1	2–2	1–1	2–2	0–1	1–4	2–1	2–1	1–4	1–0	0–2	1–1	1–1	0–2	0–3	4–2	1–0	0–0	0–0	

Updated to match(es) played on unknown. Source: Ian Laschke: Rothmans Book of Football League Records 1888–89 to 1978–79. Macdonald and Jane’s, London & Sydney, 1980.
Legend: Blue = home team win; Yellow = draw; Red = away team win.

=== Maps ===
Locations of the Football League Third Division teams 1976–1977

== Fourth Division ==
Football League Fourth Division
- Season: 1976–77
- Champions: Cambridge United (1st title)
- Promoted: Bradford City; Colchester United; Exeter City
- Failed re-election: Workington
- Matches: 552
- Goals: 1,423 (2.58 per match)
- Top goalscorer: Brian Joicey (Barnsley), 25

Pos	Team	Pld	W	D	L	GF	GA	GD	Pts	Promotion or relegation
1	Cambridge United (C, P)	46	26	13	7	87	40	+47	65	Promotion to the Third Division
2	Exeter City (P)	46	25	12	9	70	46	+24	62	Promotion to the Third Division
3	Colchester United (P)	46	25	9	12	77	43	+34	59	Promotion to the Third Division
4	Bradford City (P)	46	23	13	10	78	51	+27	59	Promotion to the Third Division
5	Swansea City	46	25	8	13	92	68	+24	58	
6	Barnsley	46	23	9	14	62	39	+23	55	
7	Watford	46	18	15	13	67	50	+17	51	
8	Doncaster Rovers	46	21	9	16	71	65	+6	51	
9	Huddersfield Town	46	19	12	15	60	49	+11	50	
10	Southend United	46	15	19	12	52	45	+7	49	
11	Darlington	46	18	13	15	59	64	−5	49	
12	Crewe Alexandra	46	19	11	16	47	60	−13	49	
13	Bournemouth	46	15	18	13	54	44	+10	48	
14	Stockport County	46	13	19	14	53	57	−4	45	
15	Brentford	46	18	7	21	77	76	+1	43	
16	Torquay United	46	17	9	20	59	67	−8	43	
17	Aldershot	46	16	11	19	49	59	−10	43	
18	Rochdale	46	13	12	21	50	59	−9	38	
19	Newport County	46	14	10	22	42	58	−16	38	
20	Scunthorpe United	46	13	11	22	49	73	−24	37	
21	Halifax Town	46	11	14	21	47	58	−11	36	Re-elected
22	Hartlepool	46	10	12	24	47	73	−26	32	Re-elected
23	Southport	46	3	19	24	33	77	−44	25	Re-elected
24	Workington (R)	46	4	11	31	41	102	−61	19	Failed re-election and demoted to the Northern Premier League

(C) Champions; (P) Promoted; (R) Relegated

=== Results ===
Home \ Away	BOU	ALD	BAR	BRA	BRE	CAM	COL	CRE	DAR	DON	EXE	HAL	HAR	HUD	NPC	ROC	SCU	STD	SOU	STP	SWA	TOR	WAT	WRK
AFC Bournemouth		4–1	1–0	1–1	3–1	0–1	0–0	0–0	0–1	3–1	2–0	3–0	2–0	1–0	1–0	1–1	2–2	2–0	5–0	3–0	1–1	1–1	2–1	1–1
Aldershot	1–0		0–1	2–1	1–1	1–3	1–1	1–1	1–2	1–0	2–2	0–0	3–0	1–0	4–0	0–2	1–1	0–0	1–0	2–0	2–2	0–1	2–1	2–0
Barnsley	3–1	1–0		2–2	2–0	2–1	0–1	2–2	1–1	1–1	3–4	1–0	3–0	2–1	2–0	2–0	5–1	3–1	1–0	1–0	1–0	2–1	1–1	4–0
Bradford City	1–1	3–1	0–0		3–2	0–0	1–0	1–0	3–1	3–1	1–1	3–0	2–2	3–1	3–1	3–0	4–0	2–0	1–0	3–3	4–1	3–2	0–0	4–1
Brentford	3–2	0–1	0–1	4–0		0–2	1–4	0–0	0–3	2–2	1–0	2–1	3–1	1–3	1–1	3–2	4–2	1–0	3–0	4–0	4–0	3–2	3–0	5–0
Cambridge United	2–0	4–1	0–0	2–1	3–2		2–0	2–0	4–0	3–0	1–1	4–0	2–0	1–1	3–1	0–0	1–0	2–3	5–1	2–2	2–3	4–1	4–0	4–1
Colchester United	1–0	1–0	1–0	2–1	2–1	0–1		3–2	4–0	1–0	3–1	3–0	6–2	3–1	5–0	1–0	1–1	0–1	4–1	1–0	1–1	4–0	1–0	3–1
Crewe Alexandra	2–1	1–0	1–0	1–0	3–2	1–0	1–0		1–1	1–2	2–0	3–1	3–1	0–0	2–0	1–1	2–1	1–1	0–0	2–1	3–1	2–1	2–0	1–1
Darlington	4–0	2–1	2–1	0–0	2–2	0–2	2–0	4–0		1–3	2–1	0–0	3–1	2–0	1–0	0–2	5–2	0–0	2–1	0–2	0–4	2–1	0–0	3–2
Doncaster Rovers	0–0	1–2	2–1	2–3	5–0	1–1	3–2	3–0	4–0		0–3	3–0	2–1	2–0	1–0	2–0	3–0	0–3	3–1	1–0	2–1	0–4	1–0	6–3
Exeter City	1–1	3–0	1–0	0–0	3–2	1–1	1–0	3–0	1–0	0–2		1–0	3–1	2–0	1–0	2–1	2–0	3–1	3–1	2–1	2–0	3–0	2–2	0–0
Halifax Town	2–3	2–0	0–1	2–1	0–0	0–2	1–2	3–0	2–1	6–0	1–2		1–0	0–0	0–0	0–0	0–1	3–1	1–1	2–1	1–0	2–0	1–1	6–1
Hartlepool	0–1	0–2	0–2	0–1	2–0	2–2	2–2	3–0	1–1	0–0	2–2	1–0		0–1	0–1	2–0	3–0	1–1	1–1	1–1	2–2	4–0	1–0	2–0
Huddersfield Town	0–0	2–0	1–0	3–0	1–0	1–2	0–0	0–1	3–1	2–1	0–1	1–0	4–1		3–0	2–1	1–0	1–1	1–0	2–0	2–2	2–1	2–2	2–1
Newport County	1–0	2–1	1–1	2–0	3–1	4–2	1–2	2–1	0–1	1–2	0–3	1–1	1–1	1–1		3–0	0–0	3–0	3–1	0–1	0–2	0–0	3–0	1–0
Rochdale	0–0	2–1	2–3	0–1	2–3	2–2	1–0	0–1	2–2	1–0	1–2	4–1	0–1	2–2	0–0		5–0	0–0	3–0	1–1	1–0	0–1	3–1	0–3
Scunthorpe United	0–0	1–3	1–2	2–1	2–1	0–2	2–0	4–0	3–0	1–1	4–1	2–1	2–0	0–4	1–0	0–1		1–0	1–1	2–2	0–3	0–0	0–0	3–1
Southend United	2–2	5–0	1–1	4–1	2–1	0–1	0–0	1–0	0–0	2–1	2–0	1–1	1–0	1–1	1–1	3–0	1–1		3–2	0–0	1–2	0–3	2–1	2–0
Southport	0–0	0–1	1–0	0–4	1–2	0–0	1–3	0–0	0–0	2–2	1–1	0–0	1–2	2–2	0–1	1–1	2–1	0–0		1–0	1–3	1–1	1–3	1–1
Stockport County	1–0	0–0	2–1	1–1	2–0	0–0	1–1	1–2	2–2	2–1	0–0	1–1	1–0	2–3	2–1	0–1	1–0	0–0	2–2		3–0	2–1	2–2	1–0
Swansea City	3–0	4–2	2–1	2–3	5–3	3–1	2–1	3–0	2–1	1–1	0–0	2–1	4–2	2–1	3–1	3–2	2–0	2–0	2–1	4–4		4–1	1–4	4–0
Torquay United	2–1	0–1	1–0	0–3	1–1	2–2	2–2	5–0	2–0	0–1	0–1	3–2	1–0	1–0	1–0	2–0	1–3	0–0	0–0	1–2	2–1		3–1	3–1
Watford	1–1	1–1	1–0	1–1	0–1	2–0	2–1	3–1	1–1	5–1	4–1	0–0	4–0	2–0	2–0	3–1	2–1	1–1	2–0	1–1	2–0	4–0		2–0
Workington	1–1	1–1	0–1	0–1	1–3	0–2	2–4	1–0	2–3	1–1	1–3	1–1	1–1	3–2	0–1	0–2	1–0	0–3	2–2	2–2	1–3	2–4	0–1	

Updated to match(es) played on unknown. Source: Ian Laschke: Rothmans Book of Football League Records 1888–89 to 1978–79. Macdonald and Jane’s, London & Sydney, 1980.
Legend: Blue = home team win; Yellow = draw; Red = away team win.

=== Maps ===
Locations of the Football League Fourth Division London teams 1976–1977
Locations of the Football League Fourth Division teams 1976–1977

== Attendances ==
=== Division One ===
#	Football club	Average attendance
1	Manchester United	53,710
2	Liverpool FC	47,221
3	Manchester City FC	40,058
4	Aston Villa FC	37,903
5	Newcastle United FC	33,599
6	Sunderland AFC	32,943
7	Arsenal FC	32,663
8	Leeds United FC	30,530
9	Tottenham Hotspur FC	30,173
10	Everton FC	30,046
11	Birmingham City FC	28,338
12	Ipswich Town FC	26,672
13	West Ham United FC	26,064
14	Derby County FC	25,008
15	West Bromwich Albion FC	24,525
16	Bristol City FC	23,522
17	Norwich City FC	22,305
18	Middlesbrough FC	21,480
19	Coventry City FC	21,247
20	Queens Park Rangers FC	21,062
21	Stoke City FC	19,027
22	Leicester City FC	18,807

=== Division Two ===
#	Football club	Average attendance
1	Chelsea FC	30,633
2	Bolton Wanderers FC	21,795
3	Wolverhampton Wanderers FC	21,227
4	Southampton FC	19,480
5	Nottingham Forest FC	18,064
6	Sheffield United FC	16,779
7	Fulham FC	14,589
8	Plymouth Argyle FC	13,329
9	Blackpool FC	13,171
10	Cardiff City FC	12,790
11	Burnley FC	12,173
12	Luton Town FC	11,387
13	Charlton Athletic FC	11,057
14	Notts County FC	10,943
15	Millwall FC	10,601
16	Blackburn Rovers FC	10,130
17	Oldham Athletic FC	9,944
18	Bristol Rovers FC	8,431
19	Hull City AFC	7,924
20	Carlisle United FC	7,680
21	Hereford United FC	7,240
22	Leyton Orient FC	6,222

=== Division Three ===
#	Football club	Average attendance
1	Brighton & Hove Albion FC	20,197
2	Crystal Palace FC	16,106
3	Sheffield Wednesday FC	13,688
4	Portsmouth FC	11,564
5	Wrexham AFC	9,328
6	Mansfield Town FC	8,439
7	Preston North End FC	7,987
8	Swindon Town FC	7,846
9	Lincoln City FC	7,145
10	Reading FC	6,761
11	Rotherham United FC	6,682
12	Peterborough United FC	5,996
13	Northampton Town FC	5,750
14	Walsall FC	5,498
15	Gillingham FC	5,444
16	Chesterfield FC	5,322
17	Bury FC	5,299
18	Oxford United FC	5,152
19	Shrewsbury Town FC	4,974
20	Grimsby Town FC	4,738
21	Chester City FC	4,609
22	Port Vale FC	4,357
23	Tranmere Rovers	3,251
24	York City FC	3,005

=== Division Four ===
#	Football club	Average attendance
1	Huddersfield Town AFC	6,148
2	Watford FC	6,035
3	Bradford City AFC	5,630
4	Southend United FC	5,551
5	Barnsley FC	5,529
6	Swansea City AFC	5,311
7	Brentford FC	5,121
8	Colchester United FC	4,651
9	Doncaster Rovers FC	4,631
10	Exeter City FC	4,624
11	Cambridge United FC	4,445
12	AFC Bournemouth	4,035
13	Stockport County FC	3,851
14	Aldershot Town FC	3,631
15	Scunthorpe United FC	3,483
16	Torquay United FC	2,958
17	Darlington FC	2,744
18	Newport County AFC	2,612
19	Crewe Alexandra FC	2,379
20	Halifax Town AFC	2,340
21	Hartlepool United FC	1,911
22	Rochdale AFC	1,745
23	Southport FC	1,438
24	Workington AFC	1,338

== See also ==
- 1976-77 in English football
