= Tom Ritchie =

Scottish footballer (born 1952)

Personal information
- Full name: Thomas Gibb Ritchie
- Date of birth: 2 January 1952 (age 74)
- Place of birth: Edinburgh, Scotland
- Position: Forward

Youth career
- Bean Cross Imperials

Senior career*
Years	Team	Apps	(Gls)
1969–1981	Bristol City	321	(77)
1981–1982	Sunderland	35	(8)
1982	Carlisle United	15	(0)
1982–1984	Bristol City	93	(25)
1984–1985	Yeovil Town		
- * Club domestic league appearances and goals

Thomas Gibb Ritchie (born 2 January 1952) is a Scottish former footballer who made over 440 appearances in the Football League scoring 110 league goals playing as a striker, most notably for Bristol City.

== Career ==
Born in Edinburgh, Tom Ritchie played locally for Bridgend Thistle in Scotland. Bristol City manager Alan Dicks signed Ritchie in July 1969. Ritchie established himself in the Bristol City attack, playing a key role in the club's rise to the First Division by 1976. He stayed with Bristol City until January 1981 when, following City's relegation, he transferred to Sunderland for £180,000. Then followed a loan spell at Carlisle United. Ritchie returned to Bristol City when manager Terry Cooper signed him on a free transfer in June 1982 following the club's relegation to the Fourth Division. Ritchie would become one of the few players to play for Bristol City in all four divisions along with Chris Garland. Ritchie left Bristol City for the second time in December 1984 when signed by former colleague Gerry Gow for Yeovil Town in the Southern League.
