= Jimmy Mann (footballer) =

English footballer (1952–2026)

Personal information
- Full name: James Arthur Mann
- Date of birth: 15 December 1952
- Place of birth: Goole, England
- Date of death: May 2026 (aged 73)
- Position: Midfielder

Senior career*
Years	Team	Apps	(Gls)
1969–1974	Leeds United	2	(0)
1974–1982	Bristol City	231	(31)
1982–1983	Barnsley	15	(0)
1983	Scunthorpe United	2	(0)
1983	Doncaster Rovers	13	(0)
1983–19??	Goole Town		
- * Club domestic league appearances and goals

James Arthur Mann (15 December 1952 – May 2026) was an English footballer who made over 230 appearances in the Football League as a midfielder, predominantly for Bristol City.

== Career ==
Jimmy Mann began his career at Leeds United. In 1974, he joined Bristol City and played a role in the Robins' promotion to the First Division under Alan Dicks in 1976.

He remained at Bristol City until the 1981–82 season, when he left the club as one of the "Ashton Gate Eight". Brief spells at Barnsley, Scunthorpe United and Doncaster Rovers followed before moving into non-league football with Goole Town and Bentley Victoria.

After retiring from football, Mann returned to hometown of Goole as a mobile security officer, then as a milkman. In 1994, he became a marine operator at Goole Docks.

== Personal life and death ==
Mann was born in Goole, Yorkshire, on 15 December 1952. He died in May 2026, at the age of 73.
