= Alan Dicks =

English footballer and manager

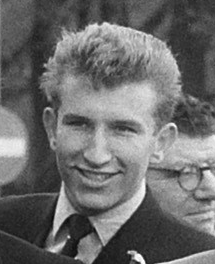
- Dicks in 1955

Personal information
- Date of birth: 29 August 1934 (age 92)
- Place of birth: Kennington, London, England
- Position: Wing half

Senior career*
Years	Team	Apps	(Gls)
1952–1958	Chelsea	33	(1)
1958–1962	Southend United	85	(2)

Managerial career
- 1967–1980: Bristol City
- 1982–1983: Ethnikos Piraeus
- 1984–1985: Apollon Limassol
- 1989–1990: Al-Rayyan SC
- 1990–1991: Fulham
- 1996–1997: Carolina Dynamo
- 1999–2001: Charleston Battery
- * Club domestic league appearances and goals

Alan Dicks (born 29 August 1934) is an English retired football player and manager. He managed Bristol City for thirteen years and managed clubs in four countries on three continents.

== Career ==
Born in London, he signed for Chelsea at the age of 17, though his playing time in the first team was limited to 35 matches in six years, during this time he completed his two years national service with the RAF and so only played one game in Chelsea's 1954–55 championship season. In 1958 he moved to Southend United, and in 1962 joined Coventry City as assistant manager and coach under Jimmy Hill.

In 1967 Hill recommended him for the vacant manager's job at Bristol City. He held it for thirteen years. In that time he consolidated City's position in the Second Division, and eventually, in 1976, led them to promotion to the First Division – then English football's top flight. During his spell as manager the club also made the semi-finals of the 1971 League Cup and won the 1978 Anglo-Scottish Cup. Dicks remained as manager throughout City's four-year stay in Division 1, but relegation at the end of the 1979–80 season and a poor start to the following season saw him leave on 8 September 1980. 20 months later City were in the 4th Division.

Dicks also managed Ethnikos Piraeus in Greece, Apollon Limassol in Cyprus and in Qatar (where he won the championship with Al-Rayyan Sports Club).

He managed Fulham for one season in 1990–91 having been initially recruited to help manager Ray Lewington. It was his first job back in English football for over a decade. The team's performance was poor. They finished 21st in the league (a position which normally would have seen them relegated to Division Four, though they were saved from this fate thanks to league restructuring) and were eliminated from the FA Cup by non-league side Hayes. Things appeared to be going better in the following season, but a run of five successive defeats near the end of 1991 saw him sacked. After leaving Fulham he moved to the United States and subsequently became head coach of Carolina Dynamo and then Charleston Battery in the A-League.

== Personal life ==
He is the younger brother of fellow footballer Ronnie Dicks, who played for Middlesbrough.

== Managerial statistics ==
Managerial record by team and tenure
Team	From	To	Record				
Team	From	To	P	W	D	L	Win %
Bristol City	1 October 1967	8 September 1980	611	202	174	235	33.1
Fulham	9 July 1990	31 December 1991	75	17	23	35	22.7
Total			686	219	197	270	31.9
