= 1980–81 Colchester United F.C. season =

Colchester United
1980–81 season
- Chairman: Jack Rippingale
- Manager: Bobby Roberts
- Stadium: Layer Road
- Third Division: 22nd (relegated)
- FA Cup: 3rd round (eliminated by Watford)
- League Cup: 1st round (eliminated by Gillingham)
- Top goalscorer: League: Kevin Bremner (10); All: Kevin Bremner (8)
- Highest home attendance: 7,769 v Watford, 3 January 1981
- Lowest home attendance: 1,430 v Carlisle United, 2 May 1981
- Average home league attendance: 2,956
- Biggest win: 3–0 v Millwall, 13 September 1980 v Portsmouth, 22 November 1980 v Oxford United, 29 November 1980
- Biggest defeat: 0–4 v Exeter City, 30 August 1980 v Carlisle United, 6 December 1980
Home colours

The 1980–81 season was Colchester United's 39th season in their history and fourth successive season in third tier of English football, the Third Division. Alongside competing in the Third Division, the club also participated in the FA Cup and the League Cup.

On the back of the success of the previous season, Colchester crashed out of the Third Division, relegated in 22nd-position. Several winless streaks contributed to their downfall. In the cup competitions, the U's were defeated in the first round of the League Cup by Gillingham, while Watford overcame Colchester in the third round of the FA Cup.

== Season overview ==
The club's chairman warned financial difficulties would result in an exodus of players, but in the summer months, only Steve Dowman left the club, joining Wrexham for £75,000. The club also received their first-ever shirt sponsorship from Royal London Insurance.

In the opening game of the season in the League Cup against Gillingham, debutant Nigel Crouch became the first Colchester player to be sent off on their debut following an altercation with Gillingham's Steve Bruce. Colchester failed to win any of their opening eight games. When they beat Millwall 3–0 in their ninth game, it attracted national media coverage. Sergeant Frank Ruggles of Essex Police marched on the field during play and attempted to arrest Millwall defender Mel Blyth for swearing.

Manager Bobby Roberts signed unknown Highland League player Kevin Bremner for a then-club record £25,000. Following this came six consecutive home wins, and Colchester were well-placed in the table by Christmas. However, after Trevor Lee moved to Gillingham for a club record deal worth £90,000, the U's form dipped and they began to slip down the table again. In response to this, on transfer deadline day, Roberts matched Colchester's record fee paid for Bremner, signing Roger Osborne from Ipswich Town, while also paying £15,000 each for Roy McDonough and Phil Coleman.

Eight games without a win from March to the penultimate game of the season ensured Colchester were relegated by just two points. Amid news of a 25,000 all-seater stadium development in the pipeline, the stark reality was that a new all-time low attendance of 1,430 witnessed the final day 1–0 win over Carlisle United, with a league average of just 2,641.

Despite relegation, Roberts was given a vote of confidence by the board, while the local Council refused the new stadium plans ensuring the U's would remain at Layer Road for the foreseeable future.

== Players ==
As of match played 2 May 1981.

Name	Position	Nationality	Place of birth	Date of birth	Apps	Goals	Signed from	Date signed	Fee
Goalkeepers
Ian Cranstone	GK	(England)	Rochford		0	0	(England) Tottenham Hotspur	Summer 1977	Free transfer
Bobby Hamilton	GK				0	0	Unknown	Summer 1977	
Mike Walker	GK	(Wales)	Colwyn Bay	28 November 1945 (aged 34)	366	0	(England) Watford	July 1973	£4,000
Defenders
Phil Coleman	FB	(England)	Woolwich	8 September 1960 (aged 19)	0	0	(England) Millwall	February 1981	£15,000
Micky Cook	FB	(England)	Enfield	9 April 1951 (aged 29)	501	15	(England) Orient	1 March 1969	Free transfer
Nigel Crouch	FB	(England)	Ardleigh	24 November 1958 (aged 21)	0	0	(England) Ipswich Town	Summer 1980	Free transfer
Leo Cusenza	FB	(England)	Edmonton	20 February 1963 (aged 17)	0	0	Apprentice	Summer 1979	Free transfer
Mick Packer	FB	(England)	Willesden	20 April 1950 (aged 30)	317	18	(England) Watford	July 1973	Free transfer
Steve Wignall	CB	(England)	Liverpool	17 September 1954 (aged 25)	135	9	(England) Doncaster Rovers	September 1977	£5,000
Steve Wright	CB	(England)	Clacton-on-Sea	16 June 1959 (aged 20)	76	2	(England) Woods Athletic	1 October 1977	Free transfer
Midfielders
Russell Cotton	MF	(England)	Wellington	4 April 1960 (aged 20)	7	0	Apprentice	26 October 1977	Free transfer
Tony Evans	MF	(England)	Colchester	14 March 1960 (aged 20)	22	2	Apprentice	4 March 1978 (Note: Date of signing refers to the date of the player's first game for the club)	Free transfer
Steve Foley	MF	(England)	Clacton-on-Sea	21 June 1953 (aged 26)	276	51	Apprentice	July 1969	Free transfer
Steve Leslie	MF	(England)	Hornsey	4 September 1952 (aged 27)	344	41	Apprentice	20 April 1971	Free transfer
Dennis Longhorn	MF	(England)	Hythe	12 September 1950 (aged 29)	0	0	(England) Aldershot	May 1980	Free transfer
Roger Osborne	MF	(England)	Otley	9 March 1950 (aged 30)	0	0	(England) Ipswich Town	February 1981	£25,000
Eddie Rowles	MF	(England)	Gosport	10 March 1951 (aged 29)	71	18	(England) Darlington	26 December 1977	£15,000
Forwards
Tony Adcock	FW	(England)	Bethnal Green	27 March 1963 (aged 17)	0	0	Apprentice	31 March 1981	Free transfer
Ian Allinson	WG	(England)	Hitchin	1 October 1957 (aged 22)	205	23	Apprentice	Summer 1974	Free transfer
Kevin Bremner	FW	(Scotland)	Banff	7 October 1957 (aged 22)	0	0	(Scotland) Keith	October 1980	£25,000
Gary Harvey	FW	(England)	Colchester	19 November 1961 (aged 18)	4	2	Apprentice	March 1978	Free transfer
Bobby Hodge	WG	(England)	Exeter	30 April 1952 (aged 28)	82	10	(England) Exeter City	September 1978	£15,000
Roy McDonough	FW	(England)	Solihull	16 October 1958 (aged 21)	0	0	(England) Chelsea	February 1981	£15,000

== Transfers ==
=== In ===
Date	Position	Nationality	Name	From	Fee	Ref.
Summer 1980	FB	(England)	Nigel Crouch	(England) Ipswich Town	Free transfer	
May 1980	MF	(England)	Dennis Longhorn	(England) Aldershot	Free transfer	
October 1980	FW	(Scotland)	Kevin Bremner	(Scotland) Keith	£25,000	
February 1981	FB	(England)	Phil Coleman	(England) Millwall	£15,000	
February 1981	MF	(England)	Roger Osborne	(England) Ipswich Town	£25,000	
February 1981	FW	(England)	Roy McDonough	(England) Chelsea	£15,000	
31 March 1981	FW	(England)	Tony Adcock	Apprentice	Free transfer	

- Total spending: ▼ ~ £80,000

=== Out ===
Date	Position	Nationality	Name	To	Fee	Ref.
End of season	CB	(England)	Steve Dowman	(Wales) Wrexham	£75,000	
3 January 1981	FW	(England)	Trevor Lee	(England) Gillingham	£90,000	(Note: Date of departure refers to the date of the player's final game for the club)
March 1981	FW	(England)	Bobby Gough	(England) Hendon	Released	

- Total incoming: ▲ ~ £170,000

=== Loans out ===
Date	Position	Nationality	Name	To	End date	Ref.
Late 1980	MF	(England)	Tony Evans	(Norway) Kongsvinger	Late 1980	
Late 1980	FW	(England)	Gary Harvey	(Norway) Kongsvinger	Late 1980	

== Match details ==
=== Third Division ===
==== Results round by round ====
Round	1	2	3	4	5	6	7	8	9	10	11	12	13	14	15	16	17	18	19	20	21	22	23	24	25	26	27	28	29	30	31	32	33	34	35	36	37	38	39	40	41	42	43	44	45	46
Ground	H	A	H	A	A	H	H	A	H	A	A	H	H	A	A	H	H	A	A	H	H	A	H	A	H	A	H	H	A	A	H	A	H	A	H	H	A	H	A	H	A	A	A	H	A	H
Result	D	L	D	L	L	W	D	W	D	L	L	W	D	D	L	D	W	L	L	W	W	D	W	L	W	L	W	W	L	L	L	L	W	D	W	L	W	L	L	D	L	L	D	L	L	W
Position	9	16	15	22	22	21	18	15	15	19	20	16	17	17	18	19	16	18	19	18	14	15	13	15	13	14	12	12	15	15	15	16	15	14	12	13	14	14	16	19	20	21	21	21	22	22

Source: 11v11.com
A = Away; H = Home; W = Win; D = Draw; L = Loss

==== League table ====
Pos	Team	Pld	W	D	L	GF	GA	GD	Pts	Promotion or relegation
20	Walsall	46	13	15	18	59	74	−15	41	
21	Sheffield United (R)	46	14	12	20	65	63	+2	40	Relegation to the Fourth Division
22	Colchester United (R)	46	14	11	21	45	65	−20	39	Relegation to the Fourth Division
23	Blackpool (R)	46	9	14	23	45	75	−30	32	Relegation to the Fourth Division
24	Hull City (R)	46	8	16	22	40	71	−31	32	Relegation to the Fourth Division

Source: rsssf.com
(R) Relegated

==== Matches ====
16 August 1980 1	Colchester United	2–2	Plymouth Argyle	Colchester
	Hodge 53'; Gough 90'	Report	Kemp 18'; Murphy 46'	Stadium: Layer Road; Attendance: 2,061; Referee: D Letts

20 August 1980 2	Fulham	1–0	Colchester United	Fulham
	Lock 59' (pen.)	Report		Stadium: Craven Cottage; Attendance: 4,250; Referee: R Toseland

23 August 1980 3	Colchester United	1–1	Walsall	Colchester
	Rowles 74'	Report	O'Kelly 23'	Stadium: Layer Road; Attendance: 1,979; Referee: Ron Challis

30 August 1980 4	Exeter City	4–0	Colchester United	Exeter
	Neville 45'; Giles 64'; Delve 72'; Kellow 82' (pen.)	Report		Stadium: St James Park; Attendance: 3,918; Referee: T Spencer

6 September 1980 5	Burnley	1–0	Colchester United	Burnley
	Hamilton 27'	Report		Stadium: Turf Moor; Attendance: 4,391; Referee: T Farley

13 September 1980 6	Colchester United	3–0	Millwall	Colchester
	Foley 23'; Lee 51'; Rowles 74'	Report		Stadium: Layer Road; Attendance: 2,724; Referee: H Taylor

16 September 1980 7	Colchester United	1–1	Chesterfield	Colchester
	Lee 60'	Report	Green 39'	Stadium: Layer Road; Attendance: 2,171; Referee: J Deakin

20 September 1980 8	Charlton Athletic	1–2	Colchester United	Charlton
	Hales 35' (pen.)	Report	Foley 43'; Hodge 88'	Stadium: The Valley; Attendance: 4,323; Referee: L Burden

27 September 1980 9	Colchester United	1–1	Chester	Colchester
	Lee 90'	Report	Jones 77'	Stadium: Layer Road; Attendance: 2,147; Referee: J Martin

30 September 1980 10	Chesterfield	3–0	Colchester United	Chesterfield
	Moss 4'; Walker 43'; Birch 44'	Report		Stadium: Saltergate; Attendance: 6,674; Referee: George Courtney

4 October 1980 11	Huddersfield Town	2–0	Colchester United	Huddersfield
	Kindon 50' (pen.); Brown 64'	Report		Stadium: Leeds Road; Attendance: 8,400; Referee: K McNally

7 October 1980 12	Colchester United	1–0	Portsmouth	Colchester
	Lee 86'	Report		Stadium: Layer Road; Attendance: 2,702; Referee: Tony Ward

11 October 1980 13	Colchester United	2–2	Barnsley	Colchester
	Gough 20'; Hodge 87'	Report	Parker 30'; Glavin 37'	Stadium: Layer Road; Attendance: 2,749; Referee: M Dimblebee

18 October 1980 14	Blackpool	1–1	Colchester United	Blackpool
	Williams 24'	Report	Allinson 57'	Stadium: Bloomfield Road; Attendance: 6,997; Referee: G Owen

22 October 1980 15	Reading	1–0	Colchester United	Reading
	Williams 37'	Report		Stadium: Elm Park; Attendance: 3,955; Referee: A Hamil

25 October 1980 16	Colchester United	0–0	Rotherham United	Colchester
		Report		Stadium: Layer Road; Attendance: 2,623; Referee: B Hill

28 October 1980 17	Colchester United	2–0	Hull City	Colchester
	Allinson 16'; Lee 89'	Report		Stadium: Layer Road; Attendance: 2,239; Referee: D Reeves

1 November 1980 18	Sheffield United	3–0	Colchester United	Sheffield
	Kenworthy 1'; Trusson 44'; Charles 68'	Report		Stadium: Bramall Lane; Attendance: 12,810; Referee: G Nolan

4 November 1980 19	Portsmouth	2–1	Colchester United	Portsmouth
	Gregory 34', 65'	Report	Lee 38'	Stadium: Fratton Park; Attendance: 10,895; Referee: E Read

8 November 1980 20	Colchester United	1–0	Swindon Town	Colchester
	Hodge 76' (pen.)	Report		Stadium: Layer Road; Attendance: 2,153; Referee: B Martin

11 November 1980 21	Colchester United	3–2	Fulham	Colchester
	Wignall 16'; Allinson 17', 70'	Report	Beck 24'; Davies 53'	Stadium: Layer Road; Attendance: 2,543; Referee: D Lloyd

15 November 1980 22	Plymouth Argyle	1–1	Colchester United	Plymouth
	Kemp 78'	Report	Bremner 38'	Stadium: Home Park; Attendance: 4,905; Referee: David Hutchinson

29 November 1980 23	Colchester United	3–0	Oxford United	Colchester
	Hodge 73' (pen.); Bremner 75', 78'	Report		Stadium: Layer Road; Attendance: 2,114; Referee: Colin Downey

6 December 1980 24	Carlisle United	4–0	Colchester United	Carlisle
	Brown 34'; Beardsley 43', 46'; Staniforth 75'	Report		Stadium: Brunton Park; Attendance: 3,196; Referee: J Hough

20 December 1980 25	Colchester United	1–0	Newport County	Colchester
	Hodge 43' (pen.)	Report		Stadium: Layer Road; Attendance: 2,160; Referee: Alf Grey

26 December 1980 26	Brentford	2–1	Colchester United	Brentford
	Kruse 18'; Hurlock 71'	Report	Bremner 43'	Stadium: Griffin Park; Attendance: 6,240; Referee: G Napthine

27 December 1980 27	Colchester United	2–1	Gillingham	Colchester
	Packer 27'; Lee 90'	Report	Price 37'	Stadium: Layer Road; Attendance: 3,879; Referee: C White

10 January 1981 28	Colchester United	3–2	Blackpool	Colchester
	Foley 12'; Gough 56', 74'	Report	Morris 37'; Ball 68'	Stadium: Layer Road; Attendance: 2,378; Referee: M Bidmead

17 January 1981 29	Oxford United	2–1	Colchester United	Oxford
	Shotton 18'; Jeffrey 68'	Report	Foley 89'	Stadium: Manor Ground; Attendance: 3,498; Referee: M Baker

31 January 1981 30	Walsall	3–1	Colchester United	Walsall
	Waddington 8'; Mower 25'; Smith 90'	Report	Allinson 78'	Stadium: Fellows Park; Attendance: 3,195; Referee: D Owen

3 February 1981 31	Colchester United	1–2	Exeter City	Colchester
	Bremner 33'	Report	Forbes 11'; Pullar 29'	Stadium: Layer Road; Attendance: 2,357; Referee: J Bray

7 February 1981 32	Millwall	3–1	Colchester United	New Cross
	Bartley 18'; Martin 57'; Horrix 66'	Report	Bremner 44'	Stadium: The Den; Attendance: 4,565; Referee: L Shapter

14 February 1981 33	Colchester United	2–1	Burnley	Colchester
	McDonough 25'; Bremner 63'	Report	Hamilton 79'	Stadium: Layer Road; Attendance: 3,082; Referee: Tom Bune

21 February 1981 34	Chester	0–0	Colchester United	Chester
		Report		Stadium: Sealand Road; Attendance: 1,778; Referee: A Challinor

28 February 1981 35	Colchester United	2–0	Charlton Athletic	Colchester
	Foley 6'; Packer 10' (pen.)	Report	Tydeman (yellow card) 80' (red card)	Stadium: Layer Road; Attendance: 4,864; Referee: D Richardson

7 March 1981 36	Colchester United	1–2	Huddersfield Town	Colchester
	Packer 45'	Report	Robins 39'; Lillis 67'	Stadium: Layer Road; Attendance: 3,644; Referee: J Deakin

17 March 1981 37	Hull City	0–1	Colchester United	Kingston upon Hull
		Report	Cotton 4'	Stadium: Boothferry Park; Attendance: 3,586; Referee: R Chadwick

22 March 1981 38	Colchester United	1–2	Reading	Colchester
	Bremner 27'	Report	Heale 8', 35'	Stadium: Layer Road; Attendance: 3,705; Referee: Ron Challis

28 March 1981 39	Rotherham United	2–0	Colchester United	Rotherham
	Moore 7', 76'	Report		Stadium: Millmoor; Attendance: 7,956; Referee: Peter Willis

4 April 1981 40	Colchester United	1–1	Sheffield United	Colchester
	Allinson 13'	Report	Wiggan 52'	Stadium: Layer Road; Attendance: 2,439; Referee: K Salmon

7 April 1981 41	Barnsley	3–0	Colchester United	Barnsley
	McHale 30'; Parker 37', 84'	Report		Stadium: Oakwell; Attendance: 13,283; Referee: P Richardson

11 April 1981 42	Swindon Town	3–0	Colchester United	Swindon
	Rideout 33', 77'; Rowland 74'	Report		Stadium: County Ground; Attendance: 6,120; Referee: Rob Lewis

18 April 1981 43	Gillingham	0–0	Colchester United	Gillingham
15:00 BST		Report		Stadium: Priestfield Stadium; Attendance: 4,408; Referee: A Robinson

20 April 1981 44	Colchester United	0–2	Brentford	Colchester
		Report	Shrubb 22'; Booker 43'	Stadium: Layer Road; Attendance: 2,609; Referee: B Hill

25 April 1981 45	Newport County	1–0	Colchester United	Newport
	Aldridge 24'	Report		Stadium: Somerton Park; Attendance: 4,619; Referee: T Spencer

2 May 1981 46	Colchester United	1–0	Carlisle United	Colchester
	McDonough 24'	Report		Stadium: Layer Road; Attendance: 1,430; Referee: Tony Ward

=== League Cup ===
9 August 1980 1st round 1st leg	Colchester United	0–2	Gillingham	Colchester
	Crouch (red card)	Report	Price 13'; Bruce 60'	Stadium: Layer Road; Attendance: 2,514; Referee: K Salmon

12 August 1980 1st round 2nd leg	Gillingham	2–1	Colchester United	Gillingham
	Ford 88'; Bruce 90'	Report	Gough 52'	Stadium: Priestfield Stadium; Attendance: 5,220
Note: Gillingham won 4–1 on aggregate

=== FA Cup ===
22 November 1980 1st round	Colchester United	3–0	Portsmouth	Colchester
	Lee 26'; Allinson 81'; Bremner 87'	Report		Stadium: Layer Road; Attendance: 5,387; Referee: C Maskell

13 December 1980 2nd round	Colchester United	1–1	Yeovil Town	Colchester
	Wignall 86'	Report	Green 14'; Broom (red card)	Stadium: Layer Road; Attendance: 3,394; Referee: K Salmon

17 December 1980 2nd round replay	Yeovil Town	0–2	Colchester United	Yeovil
		Report	Lee 58'; Bremner 67'	Stadium: Huish Athletic Ground; Attendance: 5,803

3 January 1981 3rd round	Colchester United	0–1	Watford	Colchester
		Report	Poskett	Stadium: Layer Road; Attendance: 7,769; Referee: J Martin

== Squad statistics ==
=== Appearances and goals ===
No.	Pos	Nat	Player	Total		Third Division		FA Cup		League Cup	
No.	Pos	Nat	Player	Apps	Goals	Apps	Goals	Apps	Goals	Apps	Goals
	GK	(Wales) WAL	Mike Walker	52	0	46	0	4	0	2	0
	DF	(England) ENG	Phil Coleman	4	0	4	0	0	0	0	0
	DF	(England) ENG	Micky Cook	50	0	45	0	4	0	1	0
	DF	(England) ENG	Nigel Crouch	11	0	9+1	0	0	0	1	0
	DF	(England) ENG	Leo Cusenza	1	0	0	0	0	0	1	0
	DF	(England) ENG	Mick Packer	49	3	43	3	4	0	2	0
	DF	(England) ENG	Steve Wignall	48	2	42	1	4	1	2	0
	DF	(England) ENG	Steve Wright	17	0	17	0	0	0	0	0
	MF	(England) ENG	Russell Cotton	20	1	18+1	1	0	0	1	0
	MF	(England) ENG	Tony Evans	10	0	6+2	0	0	0	0+2	0
	MF	(England) ENG	Steve Foley	36	5	30+1	5	3	0	2	0
	MF	(England) ENG	Steve Leslie	47	0	41+2	0	4	0	0	0
	MF	(England) ENG	Dennis Longhorn	26	0	21+1	0	2+1	0	1	0
	MF	(England) ENG	Roger Osborne	12	0	11+1	0	0	0	0	0
	MF	(England) ENG	Eddie Rowles	26	2	21	2	3	0	2	0
	FW	(England) ENG	Tony Adcock	1	0	1	0	0	0	0	0
	FW	(England) ENG	Ian Allinson	52	7	43+3	6	4	1	2	0
	FW	(Scotland) SCO	Kevin Bremner	38	10	33+1	8	4	2	0	0
	FW	(England) ENG	Gary Harvey	2	0	2	0	0	0	0	0
	FW	(England) ENG	Bobby Hodge	29	6	22+2	6	3	0	2	0
	FW	(England) ENG	Roy McDonough	12	2	11+1	2	0	0	0	0
Players who appeared for Colchester who left during the season
	FW	(England) ENG	Bobby Gough	18	5	15	4	1+1	0	1	1
	FW	(England) ENG	Trevor Lee	32	9	25+1	7	4	2	2	0

=== Goalscorers ===
Place	Nationality	Position	Name	Third Division	FA Cup	League Cup	Total
1	(Scotland)	FW	Kevin Bremner	8	2	0	10
2	(England)	FW	Trevor Lee	7	2	0	9
3	(England)	WG	Ian Allinson	6	1	0	7
4	(England)	WG	Bobby Hodge	6	0	0	6
5	(England)	MF	Steve Foley	5	0	0	5
5	(England)	FW	Bobby Gough	4	0	1	5
7	(England)	FB	Mick Packer	3	0	0	3
8	(England)	FW	Roy McDonough	2	0	0	2
8	(England)	MF	Eddie Rowles	2	0	0	2
8	(England)	CB	Steve Wignall	1	1	0	2
11	(England)	MF	Russell Cotton	1	0	0	1
			Own goals	0	0	0	0
			TOTALS	45	6	1	52

=== Disciplinary record ===
Nationality	Position	Name	Third Division		FA Cup		League Cup		Total	
Nationality	Position	Name	Yellow card	Red card	Yellow card	Red card	Yellow card	Red card	Yellow card	Red card
(England)	FB	Nigel Crouch	0	0	0	0	0	1	0	1
(England)	MF	Steve Foley	0	0	0	0	1	0	1	0
		TOTALS	0	0	0	0	1	1	1	1

=== Clean sheets ===
Number of games goalkeepers kept a clean sheet.

Place	Nationality	Player	Third Division	FA Cup	League Cup	Total
1	(Wales)	Mike Walker	12	2	0	14
		TOTALS	12	2	0	14

=== Player debuts ===
Players making their first-team Colchester United debut in a fully competitive match.

Position	Nationality	Player	Date	Opponent	Ground	Notes
FB	(England)	Nigel Crouch	9 August 1980	Gillingham	Layer Road	
FB	(England)	Leo Cusenza	9 August 1980	Gillingham	Layer Road	
MF	(England)	Dennis Longhorn	9 August 1980	Gillingham	Layer Road	
FW	(Scotland)	Kevin Bremner	11 October 1980	Barnsley	Layer Road	
MF	(England)	Roger Osborne	14 February 1981	Burnley	Layer Road	
FW	(England)	Roy McDonough	14 February 1981	Burnley	Layer Road	
FB	(England)	Phil Coleman	21 February 1981	Chester	Sealand Road	
FW	(England)	Tony Adcock	2 May 1981	Carlisle United	Layer Road	

== See also ==
- List of Colchester United F.C. seasons
