= 1987 Associate Members' Cup final =

1987 Associate Members' Cup Final
- Event: 1986–87 Associate Members' Cup
Bristol City	Mansfield Town
1	1
- Mansfield Town won 5–4 on penalties
- Date: 24 May 1987
- Venue: Wembley Stadium, London
- Referee: A.Gunn (Burgess Hill)
- Attendance: 58,586

The 1987 Associate Members' Cup Final, known as the Freight Rover Trophy for sponsorship reasons, was the 4th final of the domestic football cup competition for teams from the Third Division and Fourth Division. The final was played at Wembley Stadium, London on 24 May 1987, and was contested by Bristol City and Mansfield Town. With the score tied at 1–1 after extra time, Mansfield Town won the match in a penalty shootout.

The match was the first ever final at Wembley to be decided by a penalty shootout, and the trophy was Mansfield Town's first and last major honour in the club's history.

== Match details ==
24 May 1987

Bristol City	1–1 (a.e.t.)	Mansfield Town
Riley 88'	Report	Kent 57'
Penalties
Williams (penalty scored); Newman (penalty scored); MacPhail (penalty scored); Curle (penalty scored); Owen (penalty missed); Moyes (penalty missed)	4–5	(penalty scored) Kearney; (penalty missed) Cassells; (penalty scored) Stringfellow; (penalty scored) Pollard; (penalty scored) Kent; (penalty scored) Kenworthy

Wembley Stadium, London
Attendance: 58,586
Referee: A.Gunn (Burgess Hill)

GK	1	Keith Waugh
DF	2	Rob Newman
DF	3	Brian Williams
DF	4	David Moyes
DF	5	John MacPhail
MF	6	Andy Llewellyn
MF	7	Gordon Owen
MF	8	Gary Marshall	(substituted off) 115'
MF	9	Glyn Riley
FW	10	Alan Walsh	(substituted off) 70'
FW	11	Joe Jordan
Substitutes:
MF	12	Paul Fitzpatrick	(substituted on) 115'
DF	14	Keith Curle	(substituted on) 70'
Manager:
Terry Cooper

GK	1	Kevin Hitchcock
DF	2	Mike Graham
DF	3	Paul Garner
MF	4	Tony Lowery
DF	5	George Foster
DF	6	Tony Kenworthy
MF	7	Kevin Kent
MF	8	Jason Danskin	(substituted off) 90'
FW	9	Neil Whatmore	(substituted off) 65'
FW	10	Keith Cassells
MF	11	Mark Kearney
Substitutes:
DF	12	Gary Pollard	(substituted on) 90'
FW	14	Ian Stringfellow	(substituted on) 65'
Manager:
Ian Greaves

MATCH RULES

- 90 minutes.
- 30 minutes of extra-time if necessary.
- Penalty shoot-out if scores still level.
- Two named substitutes
- Maximum of two substitutions.
