= 1981–82 Colchester United F.C. season =

Colchester United
1981–82 season
- Chairman: Maurice Cadman
- Manager: Bobby Roberts (until 3 May); Ray Bunkell (from 3 May to 5 May); Allan Hunter (from 5 May)
- Stadium: Layer Road
- Fourth Division: 6th
- FA Cup: 3rd round (eliminated by Newcastle United)
- League Cup: 3rd round (eliminated by Tranmere Rovers)
- Top goalscorer: League: Ian Allinson; Kevin Bremner (21); All: Ian Allinson (26)
- Highest home attendance: 7,505 v Newcastle United, 18 January 1982
- Lowest home attendance: 1,470 v Port Vale, 3 May 1982
- Average home league attendance: 3,161
- Biggest win: 4–0 v Tranmere Rovers, 4 September 1981 v York City, 16 October 1981 v Hereford United, 20 October 1981; 5–1 v Northampton Town, 2 October 1981
- Biggest defeat: 0–3 v York City, 5 March 1982
Home colours

The 1981–82 season was Colchester United's 40th season in their history and first season back in fourth tier of English football, the Fourth Division following relegation the previous campaign. Alongside competing in the Fourth Division, the club also participated in the FA Cup and the League Cup.

Colchester mounted a serious promotion challenge for much of the season, but a downturn in form in the second half of the season led to Bobby Roberts losing his job as manager, with Allan Hunter recruited to replace him in May when the U's promotion hopes were over for the season. They exited both cups in the third round, although they took Second Division Newcastle United to a thrilling extra time finale at Layer Road where the hosts were eventually defeated 4–3.

== Season overview ==
After the board had decided to keep the faith in Bobby Roberts for the new season despite relegation, the introduction of the three-points for a win format for this year helped Colchester hit the top of the league by November 1981, scoring an impressive 41 goals. The U's also reached the third round of the FA Cup, taking Newcastle United to a replay before losing 4–3 following extra time at Layer Road.

A £25,000 outlay brought forward John Lyons to Layer Road who promptly scored on his debut as Colchester thrashed promotion rivals Sheffield United 5–2 in front of the Match of the Day cameras. However, a host of injuries and suspensions in the latter stages of the season saw Colchester drop down the table, and as such the board requested Roberts resign in April. He refused to do so and was sacked a month later. Former player Ray Bunkell filled the brief void before Allan Hunter was brought in as his replacement, tasked with his first managerial role.

Colchester had gone from promotion favourites to sixth, 16 points off the promotion places, despite a prolific strike force in Ian Allinson, who scored 26 goals, and Kevin Bremner, who scored 24 goals.

== Players ==
As of match played 15 May 1982.

Name	Position	Nationality	Place of birth	Date of birth	Apps	Goals	Signed from	Date signed	Fee
Goalkeepers
Ian Cranstone	GK	(England)	Rochford		0	0	(England) Tottenham Hotspur	Summer 1977	Free transfer
Bobby Hamilton	GK				0	0	Unknown	Summer 1977	
Mike Walker	GK	(Wales)	Colwyn Bay	28 November 1945 (aged 35)	418	0	(England) Watford	July 1973	£4,000
Jeff Wood	GK	(England)	Islington	4 February 1954 (aged 27)	0	0	(England) Charlton Athletic	Summer 1981	Undisclosed
Defenders
Phil Coleman	FB	(England)	Woolwich	8 September 1960 (aged 20)	4	0	(England) Millwall	February 1981	£15,000
Micky Cook	FB	(England)	Enfield	9 April 1951 (aged 30)	551	15	(England) Orient	1 March 1969	Free transfer
Allan Hunter	CB	(Northern Ireland)	Sion Mills	30 June 1946 (aged 34)	0	0	(England) Ipswich Town	May 1982	Player-manager
Mick Packer	FB	(England)	Willesden	20 April 1950 (aged 31)	366	21	(England) Watford	July 1973	Free transfer
Wayne Ward	FB	(England)	Colchester	28 April 1964 (aged 17)	0	0	Apprentice	April 1982	Free transfer
Steve Wignall	CB	(England)	Liverpool	17 September 1954 (aged 26)	183	11	(England) Doncaster Rovers	September 1977	£5,000
Midfielders
Andy Gooding	MF				0	0	Apprentice	Summer 1981	Free transfer
Steve Leslie	MF	(England)	Hornsey	4 September 1952 (aged 28)	391	41	Apprentice	20 April 1971 (Note: Date of signing refers to the date of the player's first game for the club)	Free transfer
Dennis Longhorn	MF	(England)	Hythe	12 September 1950 (aged 30)	26	0	(England) Aldershot	May 1980	Free transfer
Roger Osborne	MF	(England)	Otley	9 March 1950 (aged 31)	12	0	(England) Ipswich Town	February 1981	£25,000
Forwards
Tony Adcock	FW	(England)	Bethnal Green	27 March 1963 (aged 18)	1	0	Apprentice	31 March 1981	Free transfer
Ian Allinson	WG	(England)	Hitchin	1 October 1957 (aged 23)	257	30	Apprentice	Summer 1974	Free transfer
Kevin Bremner	FW	(Scotland)	Banff	7 October 1957 (aged 23)	38	10	(Scotland) Keith	October 1980	£25,000
Perry Groves	WG	(England)	Bow	19 April 1965 (aged 16)	0	0	(England) Cornard Dynamos	Summer 1981	Free transfer
John Lyons	FW	(Wales)	Buckley	8 November 1956 (aged 24)	0	0	(England) Cambridge United	February 1982	£25,000
Roy McDonough	FW	(England)	Solihull	16 October 1958 (aged 22)	12	2	(England) Chelsea	February 1981	£15,000
John Taylor	FW	(England)	Norwich	24 October 1964 (aged 16)	0	0	Apprentice	Summer 1981	Free transfer

== Transfers ==
=== In ===
Date	Position	Nationality	Name	From	Fee	Ref.
Summer 1981	GK	(England)	Jeff Wood	(England) Charlton Athletic	Undisclosed	
Summer 1981	MF		Andy Gooding	Apprentice	Free transfer	
Summer 1981	WG	(England)	Perry Groves	(England) Cornard Dynamos	Free transfer	
Summer 1981	FW	(England)	John Taylor	Apprentice	Free transfer	
February 1982	FW	(Wales)	John Lyons	(England) Cambridge United	£25,000	
April 1982	FB	(England)	Wayne Ward	Apprentice	Free transfer	
May 1982	CB	(Northern Ireland)	Allan Hunter	(England) Ipswich Town	Player-manager	

- Total spending: ▼ ~ £25,000

=== Out ===
Date	Position	Nationality	Name	To	Fee	Ref.
End of season	FB	(England)	Nigel Crouch	(England) Harwich & Parkeston	Released	
End of season	FB	(England)	Leo Cusenza	(England) Harlow Town	Released	
End of season	MF	(England)	Tony Evans	(England) Tiptree United	Released	
End of season	WG	(England)	Bobby Hodge	(England) Torquay United	Released	
End of season	FW	(England)	Gary Harvey	(England) Harwich & Parkeston	Released	
12 September 1981	MF	(England)	Steve Foley	(England) Wivenhoe Town	Released	(Note: Date of departure refers to the date of the player's final game for the club)
23 January 1982	MF	(England)	Eddie Rowles	Free agent	Retired	
30 March 1982	MF	(England)	Russell Cotton	Free agent	Released	
7 May 1982	CB	(England)	Steve Wright	(Finland) HJK Helsinki	Undisclosed	

- Total incoming: ▲ ~ £0

== Match details ==
=== Fourth Division ===
==== Results round by round ====
Round	1	2	3	4	5	6	7	8	9	10	11	12	13	14	15	16	17	18	19	20	21	22	23	24	25	26	27	28	29	30	31	32	33	34	35	36	37	38	39	40	41	42	43	44	45	46
Ground	A	H	A	H	H	A	A	H	A	H	H	A	H	A	A	H	A	H	A	H	H	A	H	A	A	H	H	A	A	A	H	H	A	A	H	H	A	H	A	A	H	H	A	H	H	A
Result	W	W	L	W	D	L	L	W	W	W	W	W	L	W	W	W	W	W	D	D	D	L	W	D	W	L	W	L	L	D	D	L	L	D	W	D	L	L	D	D	W	D	L	W	L	W
Position	2	1	6	1	3	7	8	6	7	4	5	3	4	2	4	2	1	1	1	2	2	3	3	5	4	6	5	7	7	7	6	7	7	6	6	6	6	6	6	6	6	6	6	6	6	6

Source: 11v11.com
A = Away; H = Home; W = Win; D = Draw; L = Loss

==== League table ====
Pos	Team	Pld	W	D	L	GF	GA	GD	Pts	Promotion
4	Bournemouth (P)	46	23	19	4	62	30	+32	88	Promotion to the Third Division
5	Peterborough United	46	24	10	12	71	57	+14	82	
6	Colchester United	46	20	12	14	82	57	+25	72	
7	Port Vale	46	18	16	12	56	49	+7	70	
8	Hull City	46	19	12	15	70	61	+9	69	

(P) Promoted

==== Matches ====
29 August 1981 1	Hartlepool United	1–3	Colchester United	Hartlepool
	Harding 81'	Report	Bremner 34', 59'; Packer 39' (pen.)	Stadium: Victoria Park; Attendance: 2,007; Referee: N Wilson

4 September 1981 2	Colchester United	4–0	Tranmere Rovers	Colchester
	Allinson 9', 36' (pen.); Cook 58'; Bremner 90'	Report		Stadium: Layer Road; Attendance: 2,474; Referee: Tony Ward

12 September 1981 3	Sheffield United	1–0	Colchester United	Sheffield
	Hatton 43'	Report		Stadium: Bramall Lane; Attendance: 11,293; Referee: A Robinson

18 September 1981 4	Colchester United	3–0	Torquay United	Colchester
	Adcock 18', 77'; Cook 51'	Report		Stadium: Layer Road; Attendance: 2,820; Referee: K Salmon

22 September 1981 5	Colchester United	1–1	Aldershot	Colchester
	Coleman 39'	Report	Crosby 46'	Stadium: Layer Road; Attendance: 2,719; Referee: B Hill

26 September 1981 6	Bradford City	2–1	Colchester United	Bradford
	Gallagher 5'; Staniforth 88'	Report	Leslie 63'	Stadium: Valley Parade; Attendance: 4,772; Referee: M Heath

28 September 1981 7	Port Vale	2–1	Colchester United	Burslem
	Sproson 80'; Moss 88'	Report	McDonough 52'	Stadium: Vale Park; Attendance: 3,351

2 October 1981 8	Colchester United	5–1	Northampton Town	Colchester
	Coleman 5'; Allinson 7' (pen.); Bremner 72', 86'; McDonough 83'	Report	Denyer 50' (pen.)	Stadium: Layer Road; Attendance: 2,760; Referee: D Reeves

11 October 1981 9	Rochdale	1–2	Colchester United	Rochdale
	Wellings 51'	Report	Allinson 66'; McDonough 84'	Stadium: Spotland Stadium; Attendance: 1,366

16 October 1981 10	Colchester United	4–0	York City	Colchester
	McDonough 8'; Bremner 38'; Leslie 70'; Allinson 76'; Wright (red card) 39'	Report	Walwyn (red card) 39'	Stadium: Layer Road; Attendance: 3,139; Referee: Alan Gunn

20 October 1981 11	Colchester United	4–0	Hereford United	Colchester
19:30 BST	Allinson 20'; Bremner 40'; Osborne 56', 61'	Report		Stadium: Layer Road; Attendance: 3,064; Referee: J Deakin

24 October 1981 12	Halifax Town	0–2	Colchester United	Halifax
		Report	Allinson 2' (pen.); McDonough 50'	Stadium: The Shay; Attendance: 1,374; Referee: David Webb

30 October 1981 13	Colchester United	1–2	Wigan Athletic	Colchester
	Coleman 86'	Report	McMahon 11'; Houghton 42'	Stadium: Layer Road; Attendance: 3,882; Referee: M James

2 November 1981 14	Mansfield Town	1–3	Colchester United	Mansfield
	Morgan 84'	Report	Allinson 42', 57', 81' (pen.)	Stadium: Field Mill; Attendance: 2,294; Referee: Joe Worrall

7 November 1981 15	Hull City	2–3	Colchester United	Kingston upon Hull
19:30 GMT	Mutrie 15'; Roberts 48'	Report	Bremner 12'; McDonough 61', 77'	Stadium: Boothferry Park; Attendance: 3,040; Referee: T Fitzharris

13 November 1981 16	Colchester United	2–1	Scunthorpe United	Colchester
	Allinson 38'; Cook 65'	Report	Stewart 36'	Stadium: Layer Road; Attendance: 3,838; Referee: D Letts

28 November 1981 17	Darlington	1–2	Colchester United	Darlington
15:00 GMT	Speedie 25'	Report	Bremner 5'; Osborne 53'	Stadium: Feethams; Attendance: 1,456; Referee: T Mills

4 December 1981 18	Colchester United	2–1	Blackpool	Colchester
	Allinson 14'; Noble 84' (o.g.)	Report	Bamber 31'	Stadium: Layer Road; Attendance: 3,875; Referee: A Robinson

26 December 1981 19	Bournemouth	1–1	Colchester United	Bournemouth
	Goddard 20'	Report	McDonough 78'	Stadium: Dean Court; Attendance: 8,829; Referee: S Bates

16 January 1982 20	Colchester United	1–1	Bury	Colchester
	Adcock 14'	Report	Hilton 18'	Stadium: Layer Road; Attendance: 3,504; Referee: Tom Bune

23 January 1982 21	Colchester United	3–3	Hartlepool United	Colchester
15:00 GMT	McDonough 10'; Bird 58' (o.g.); Allinson 64' (pen.)	Report	Houchen 14', 16' (pen.); Bird 38'	Stadium: Layer Road; Attendance: 2,862; Referee: Martin Bodenham

30 January 1982 22	Torquay United	1–0	Colchester United	Torquay
19:30 GMT	Unknown goalscorer	Report		Stadium: Plainmoor; Attendance: 2,037; Referee: B Stevens

6 February 1982 23	Colchester United	5–2	Sheffield United	Colchester
15:00 GMT	Lyons 4'; McDonough 8'; Allinson 9', 36'; Bremner 59'	Report	Kenworthy 38' (pen.); Edwards 62'	Stadium: Layer Road; Attendance: 5,194; Referee: C White

9 February 1982 24	Aldershot	1–1	Colchester United	Aldershot
19:45 GMT	Jopling 33'	Report	Lyons 44'	Stadium: Recreation Ground; Attendance: 2,324; Referee: Howard King

14 February 1982 25	Northampton Town	1–2	Colchester United	Northampton
15:00 GMT	Coffill 56'	Report	Allinson 19'; Bremner 75'	Stadium: County Ground; Attendance: 3,102; Referee: P Richardson

19 February 1982 26	Colchester United	1–2	Bradford City	Colchester
	Cook 73'	Report	Jackson 41'; McNiven 58'	Stadium: Layer Road; Attendance: 3,975; Referee: Tony Ward

26 February 1982 27	Colchester United	3–2	Rochdale	Colchester
	Bremner 29'; Adcock 38', 88'	Report	O'Loughlin 28'; Hilditch 75'	Stadium: Layer Road; Attendance: 2,760; Referee: M Dimblebee

2 March 1982 28	Tranmere Rovers	2–1	Colchester United	Birkenhead
	Craven 12'; Kerr 34'	Report	Bremner 75'	Stadium: Prenton Park; Attendance: 1,252; Referee: Peter Willis

5 March 1982 29	York City	3–0	Colchester United	York
	Hood 35' (pen.); Walwyn 77', 90'	Report		Stadium: Bootham Crescent; Attendance: 1,854; Referee: R Chadwick

10 March 1982 30	Hereford United	2–2	Colchester United	Hereford
	Phillips 23', 82'	Report	Allinson 48' (pen.); Osborne 54'	Stadium: Edgar Street; Attendance: 2,060; Referee: A Hamil

12 March 1982 31	Colchester United	1–1	Halifax Town	Colchester
	Bremner 8'	Report	Ayre 28'	Stadium: Layer Road; Attendance: 2,464; Referee: D Reeves

16 March 1982 32	Colchester United	0–1	Mansfield Town	Colchester
		Report	Lumby 81'	Stadium: Layer Road; Attendance: 2,000; Referee: Alf Grey

20 March 1982 33	Wigan Athletic	3–2	Colchester United	Wigan
15:00 GMT	Barrow 1', 60'; Bradd 27'	Report	Bremner 62'; Osborne 88'	Stadium: Springfield Park; Attendance: 6,747; Referee: J Hough

22 March 1982 34	Stockport County	0–0	Colchester United	Stockport
		Report		Stadium: Edgeley Park; Attendance: 1,740; Referee: G Flint

26 March 1982 35	Colchester United	2–0	Hull City	Colchester
	Bremner 54'; Coleman 78'	Report		Stadium: Layer Road; Attendance: 2,195; Referee: Colin Downey

30 March 1982 36	Colchester United	1–1	Crewe Alexandra	Colchester
	Allinson 35'	Report	Palios 41'	Stadium: Layer Road; Attendance: 1,904; Referee: K Baker

2 April 1982 37	Scunthorpe United	2–1	Colchester United	Scunthorpe
19:15 BST	Moss 19'; Telfer 60'	Report	Bremner 65'	Stadium: Old Showground; Attendance: 1,762; Referee: David Allison

10 April 1982 38	Colchester United	1–2	Bournemouth	Colchester
	Allinson 76'	Report	Funnell 30'; Crawford 34'	Stadium: Layer Road; Attendance: 2,662; Referee: Ian Borrett

13 April 1982 39	Peterborough United	2–2	Colchester United	Peterborough
19:30 BST	Smith 56'; Kellock 60'	Report	Allinson 58'; McDonough 79'	Stadium: London Road Stadium; Attendance: 5,402; Referee: A Challinor

17 April 1982 40	Blackpool	0–0	Colchester United	Blackpool
15:00 BST		Report		Stadium: Bloomfield Road; Attendance: 2,298; Referee: K Redfearn

24 April 1982 41	Colchester United	1–0	Darlington	Colchester
	Bremner 77'	Report		Stadium: Layer Road; Attendance: 1,764; Referee: Rob Lewis

27 April 1982 42	Colchester United	1–1	Peterborough United	Colchester
	Bremner 34'; Wright (yellow card) 52' (red card)	Report	Syrett 76'; Smith (yellow card) (red card)	Stadium: Layer Road; Attendance: 2,212; Referee: M Taylor

1 May 1982 43	Bury	4–3	Colchester United	Bury
15:15 BST	Butler 18'; Madden 41', 60'; Hilton 44'	Report	Lyons 40'; Bremner 68'; McDonough 86'	Stadium: Gigg Lane; Attendance: 1,720; Referee: C Seel

3 May 1982 44	Colchester United	1–0	Port Vale	Colchester
	McDonough 6'	Report		Stadium: Layer Road; Attendance: 1,470; Referee: K Salmon

7 May 1982 45	Colchester United	0–1	Stockport County	Colchester
		Report	Phillips 83'	Stadium: Layer Road; Attendance: 2,132; Referee: D Letts

15 May 1982 46	Crewe Alexandra	1–3	Colchester United	Crewe
15:00 BST	Scott 44'; Heath (red card) 67'	Report	Bremner 1'; Allinson 39'; McDonough 41'	Stadium: Gresty Road; Attendance: 1,226; Referee: Keith Hackett

=== League Cup ===
1 September 1981 1st round 1st leg	Colchester United	2–0	Gillingham	Colchester
	Bremner 11'; Allinson 60' (pen.)	Report		Stadium: Layer Road; Attendance: 2,431; Referee: J Bray

15 September 1981 1st round 2nd leg	Gillingham	1–1	Colchester United	Gillingham
	Price 53'	Report	Bremner 52'	Stadium: Priestfield Stadium; Attendance: 3,260; Referee: Colin Downey
Note: Colchester won 3–1 on aggregate

6 October 1981 2nd round 1st leg	Colchester United	3–1	Cambridge United	Colchester
	Cook 27'; McDonough 82', 88'	Report	Gibbins 87'	Stadium: Layer Road; Attendance: 3,844; Referee: J Martin

27 October 1981 2nd round 2nd leg	Cambridge United	3–2 (a.e.t.)	Colchester United	Cambridge
19:45 GMT	Gibbins 20', 54'; Reilly 65'; Donaldson (red card) 34'	Report	Allinson 17'; Bremner 110'	Stadium: Abbey Stadium; Attendance: 4,762; Referee: Rob Lewis
Note: Colchester won 5–4 on aggregate after extra time

10 November 1981 3rd round	Tranmere Rovers	1–0	Colchester United	Birkenhead
	Hutchinson 1'	Report		Stadium: Prenton Park; Attendance: 2,502; Referee: M Baker

=== FA Cup ===
21 November 1981 1st round	Colchester United	2–0	Newport County	Colchester
15:00 GMT	Leslie 50'; Adcock 74'	Report		Stadium: Layer Road; Attendance: 3,535; Referee: B Hill

16 December 1981 2nd round	Brentford	1–1	Colchester United	Brentford
15:00 GMT	Roberts 33'	Report	Allinson 15'	Stadium: Griffin Park; Attendance: 5,550; Referee: David Hutchinson

30 December 1981 2nd round replay	Colchester United	1–0	Brentford	Colchester
	McNichol 37' (o.g.)	Report		Stadium: Layer Road; Attendance: 5,532; Referee: J Deakin

4 January 1982 3rd round	Newcastle United	1–1	Colchester United	Newcastle upon Tyne
	Varadi 31'	Report	Wignall 83'	Stadium: St James' Park; Attendance: 16,977

18 January 1982 3rd round replay	Colchester United	3–4 (a.e.t.)	Newcastle United	Colchester
19:30 GMT	Cook 44'; Allinson 67' (pen.), 116' (pen.)	Report	Waddle 12'; Saunders 42'; Brownlie 94'; Varadi 115'	Stadium: Layer Road; Attendance: 7,505; Referee: T Mills

== Squad statistics ==
=== Appearances and goals ===
No.	Pos	Nat	Player	Total		Fourth Division		FA Cup		League Cup	
No.	Pos	Nat	Player	Apps	Goals	Apps	Goals	Apps	Goals	Apps	Goals
	GK	(Wales) WAL	Mike Walker	56	0	46	0	5	0	5	0
	DF	(England) ENG	Phil Coleman	47	4	34+3	4	4+1	0	4+1	0
	DF	(England) ENG	Micky Cook	56	6	46	4	5	1	5	1
	DF	(Northern Ireland) NIR	Allan Hunter	1	0	1	0	0	0	0	0
	DF	(England) ENG	Mick Packer	15	1	14	1	0	0	1	0
	DF	(England) ENG	Wayne Ward	5	0	3+2	0	0	0	0	0
	DF	(England) ENG	Steve Wignall	53	1	43	0	5	1	5	0
	MF	(England) ENG	Steve Leslie	44	3	31+3	2	4+1	1	5	0
	MF	(England) ENG	Dennis Longhorn	23	0	14+7	0	0	0	1+1	0
	MF	(England) ENG	Roger Osborne	48	5	39	5	5	0	4	0
	FW	(England) ENG	Tony Adcock	48	6	31+9	5	2+1	1	4+1	0
	FW	(England) ENG	Ian Allinson	52	26	41+1	21	5	3	5	2
	FW	(Scotland) SCO	Kevin Bremner	56	24	46	21	5	0	5	3
	FW	(England) ENG	Perry Groves	9	0	9	0	0	0	0	0
	FW	(Wales) WAL	John Lyons	18	3	16+2	3	0	0	0	0
	FW	(England) ENG	Roy McDonough	50	16	40	14	5	0	5	2
Players who appeared for Colchester who left during the season
	DF	(England) ENG	Steve Wright	48	0	38	0	5	0	5	0
	MF	(England) ENG	Russell Cotton	11	0	9+2	0	0	0	0	0
	MF	(England) ENG	Steve Foley	2	0	1+1	0	0	0	0	0
	MF	(England) ENG	Eddie Rowles	12	0	4+2	0	5	0	1	0

=== Goalscorers ===
Place	Nationality	Position	Name	Fourth Division	FA Cup	League Cup	Total
1	(England)	WG	Ian Allinson	21	3	2	26
2	(Scotland)	FW	Kevin Bremner	21	0	3	24
3	(England)	FW	Roy McDonough	14	0	2	16
4	(England)	FW	Tony Adcock	5	1	0	6
4	(England)	FB	Micky Cook	4	1	1	6
6	(England)	MF	Roger Osborne	5	0	0	5
7	(England)	FB	Phil Coleman	4	0	0	4
8	(England)	MF	Steve Leslie	2	1	0	3
8	(Wales)	FW	John Lyons	3	0	0	3
10	(England)	FB	Mick Packer	1	0	0	1
10	(England)	CB	Steve Wignall	0	1	0	1
			Own goals	2	1	0	3
			TOTALS	82	8	8	98

=== Disciplinary record ===
Nationality	Position	Name	Fourth Division		FA Cup		League Cup		Total	
Nationality	Position	Name	Booked	Sent off (straight red)	Booked	Sent off (straight red)	Booked	Sent off (straight red)	Booked	Sent off (straight red)
(England)	CB	Steve Wright	2	2	0	0	0	0	2	2
(England)	FW	Roy McDonough	1	0	0	0	0	0	1	0
		TOTALS	3	2	0	0	0	0	3	2

=== Clean sheets ===
Number of games goalkeepers kept a clean sheet.

Place	Nationality	Player	Fourth Division	FA Cup	League Cup	Total
1	(Wales)	Mike Walker	10	2	1	13
		TOTALS	10	2	1	13

=== Player debuts ===
Players making their first-team Colchester United debut in a fully competitive match.

Position	Nationality	Player	Date	Opponent	Ground	Notes
FW	(Wales)	John Lyons	6 February 1982	Sheffield United	Layer Road	
WG	(England)	Perry Groves	10 April 1982	Bournemouth	Layer Road	
FB	(England)	Wayne Ward	24 April 1982	Darlington	Layer Road	
CB	(Northern Ireland)	Allan Hunter	15 May 1982	Crewe Alexandra	Gresty Road	

== See also ==
- List of Colchester United F.C. seasons
