= 1986 Associate Members' Cup final =

1986 Associate Members' Cup Final
- Event: 1985–86 Associate Members' Cup
Bristol City	Bolton Wanderers
3	0
- Date: 24 May 1986
- Venue: Wembley Stadium, London
- Man of the Match: Steve Neville
- Referee: G.Tyson (Sunderland)
- Attendance: 54,502

The 1986 Associate Members' Cup Final, known as the Freight Rover Trophy for sponsorship reasons, was the 3rd final of the domestic football cup competition for teams from the Third Division and Fourth Division. The final was played at Wembley Stadium, London on 24 May 1986, and was contested by Bristol City and Bolton Wanderers. Bristol City won the match 3–0.

== Match details ==
24 May 1986

Bristol City	3–0	Bolton Wanderers
Riley, Pritchard	Report

Wembley Stadium, London
Attendance: 54,502
Referee: G.Tyson (Sunderland)

Keith Waugh
Rob Newman
Brian Williams
Keith Curle
David Moyes
Glyn Riley
Howard Pritchard
Bobby Hutchinson (c)
David Harle
Alan Walsh
Steve Neville
Substitutes:
Andy Llewellyn
Gary Marshall
Manager:
Terry Cooper

Simon Farnworth
Derek Scott
Jimmy Phillips
Dave Sutton
Mark Came
Steve Thompson
Phil Neal
George Oghani
Tony Caldwell
Asa Hartford
Mark Gavin
Substitutes:
Graham Bell Sam Allardyce
Player/Manager:
Phil Neal

MATCH RULES

- 90 minutes.
- 30 minutes of extra-time if necessary.
- Penalty shoot-out if scores still level.
- Two named substitutes
- Maximum of two substitutions.
