= 1978–79 Colchester United F.C. season =

Colchester United
1978–79 season
- Chairman: Jack Rippingale
- Manager: Bobby Roberts
- Stadium: Layer Road
- Third Division: 7th
- FA Cup: 5th round (eliminated by Manchester United)
- League Cup: 1st round (eliminated by Charlton Athletic)
- Top goalscorer: League: Bobby Gough (16); All: Bobby Gough (22)
- Highest home attendance: 13,171 v Manchester United, 20 February 1979
- Lowest home attendance: 2,311 v Chester, 12 September 1978
- Average home league attendance: 3,921
- Biggest win: 4–0 v Leatherhead, 19 December 1978; 5–1 v Tranmere Rovers, 9 May 1979
- Biggest defeat: 0–4 v Carlisle United, 8 September 1978
Home colours

The 1978–79 season was Colchester United's 37th season in their history and second successive season in third tier of English football, the Third Division. Alongside competing in the Third Division, the club also participated in the FA Cup and the League Cup.

Colchester improved on their previous league campaign by one position, finishing in a strong seventh. The U's were eliminated in the League Cup by Charlton Athletic in the first round, but had greater success in the FA Cup. They saw off Oxford United, Leatherhead, Darlington and Newport County before facing Manchester United in the fifth round of the competition at Layer Road. Colchester held on until the 86th-minute before Jimmy Greenhoff broke the deadlock and denied the U's an Old Trafford replay.

== Season overview ==
Bobby Roberts kept the faith in his squad for their second season in the Third Division, but an injury to Eddie Rowles forced him into the transfer market. Despite Colchester suffering financial difficulty, the club spent £15,000 on Millwall forward Trevor Lee, who became the first black player to represent Colchester's first team.

A strong season in the league saw the club finish one position higher than the previous campaign in seventh, narrowly falling short of the promotion places – nine points behind third-placed Swansea City. In the final game of the season, Colchester recorded their then highest-ever away league victory with a 5–1 win at Tranmere Rovers, less than a month after they had stunned champions-elect Watford 3–0 at Vicarage Road on Good Friday.

Colchester had a productive run in the FA Cup, where they disposed of Oxford United 4–2 with Bobby Gough netting a hat-trick. They defeated non-League Leatherhead 4–0 in a replay, and overcame difficult away ties at Darlington and Newport County. In the fifth road, the U's welcomed First Division Manchester United to Layer Road. After the fixture was called off from its original Saturday date, the crowd of 13,171 saw the U's come four minutes within an Old Trafford replay after Jimmy Greenhoff finally broke the deadlock after 86-minutes to send Colchester out.

== Players ==
As of match played 9 May 1979.

Name	Position	Nationality	Place of birth	Date of birth	Apps	Goals	Signed from	Date signed	Fee
Goalkeepers
Ian Cranstone	GK	(England)	Rochford		0	0	(England) Tottenham Hotspur	Summer 1977	Free transfer
Bobby Hamilton	GK				0	0	Unknown	Summer 1977	
Mike Walker	GK	(Wales)	Colwyn Bay	28 November 1945 (aged 32)	257	0	(England) Watford	July 1973	£4,000
Defenders
Micky Cook	FB	(England)	Enfield	9 April 1951 (aged 27)	397	14	(England) Orient	1 March 1969	Free transfer
Steve Dowman	CB	(England)	Ilford	15 April 1958 (aged 20)	94	19	Apprentice	24 August 1976 (Note: Date of signing refers to the date of the player's first game for the club)	Free transfer
Mick Packer	FB	(England)	Willesden	20 April 1950 (aged 28)	219	13	(England) Watford	July 1973	Free transfer
Steve Wignall	CB	(England)	Liverpool	17 September 1954 (aged 23)	38	2	(England) Doncaster Rovers	September 1977	£5,000
Steve Wright	CB	(England)	Clacton-on-Sea	16 June 1959 (aged 18)	1	0	(England) Woods Athletic	1 October 1977	Free transfer
Midfielders
Ray Bunkell	MF	(England)	Edmonton	18 September 1949 (aged 28)	137	9	(England) Swindon Town	December 1973	Part exchange
Russell Cotton	MF	(England)	Wellington	4 April 1960 (aged 18)	2	0	Apprentice	26 October 1977	Free transfer
Paul Dyer	MF	(England)	Leicester	24 January 1953 (aged 25)	115	2	(England) Notts County	Summer 1975	Undisclosed
Tony Evans	MF	(England)	Colchester	14 March 1960 (aged 18)	7	0	Apprentice	4 March 1978	Free transfer
Steve Foley	MF	(England)	Clacton-on-Sea	21 June 1953 (aged 24)	184	36	Apprentice	July 1969	Free transfer
Steve Leslie	MF	(England)	Hornsey	4 September 1952 (aged 25)	286	40	Apprentice	20 April 1971	Free transfer
Eddie Rowles	MF	(England)	Gosport	10 March 1951 (aged 27)	9	3	(England) Darlington	26 December 1977	£15,000
Forwards
Ian Allinson	WG	(England)	Hitchin	1 October 1957 (aged 20)	104	14	Apprentice	Summer 1974	Free transfer
Bobby Gough	FW	(England)	Ladywood	20 July 1949 (aged 28)	125	41	(England) Southport	January 1976	£7,000
Gary Harvey	FW	(England)	Colchester	19 November 1961 (aged 16)	0	0	Apprentice	March 1978	Free transfer
Bobby Hodge	WG	(England)	Exeter	30 April 1952 (aged 26)	0	0	(England) Exeter City	September 1978	£15,000
Trevor Lee	FW	(England)	Lewisham	3 June 1954 (aged 23)	0	0	(England) Millwall	November 1978	£15,000

== Transfers ==
=== In ===
Date	Position	Nationality	Name	From	Fee	Ref.
12 August 1978	MF	(Northern Ireland)	Pat Sharkey	(England) Mansfield Town	£10,000	(Note: Date of signing refers to the date of the player's first game for the club)
September 1978	WG	(England)	Bobby Hodge	(England) Exeter City	£15,000	
November 1978	FW	(England)	Trevor Lee	(England) Millwall	£15,000	

- Total spending: ▼ ~ £40,000

=== Out ===
Date	Position	Nationality	Name	To	Fee	Ref.
End of season	FB	(England)	Johnny Williams	(England) Margate	Free transfer	
31 March 1979	MF	(Northern Ireland)	Pat Sharkey	(England) Peterborough United	£8,000	

- Total incoming: ▲ ~ £8,000

== Match details ==
=== Third Division ===
==== Results round by round ====
Round	1	2	3	4	5	6	7	8	9	10	11	12	13	14	15	16	17	18	19	20	21	22	23	24	25	26	27	28	29	30	31	32	33	34	35	36	37	38	39	40	41	42	43	44	45	46
Ground	H	A	A	H	A	H	H	A	A	H	H	A	A	H	A	H	A	H	H	H	A	A	A	H	A	H	H	A	H	A	A	A	H	A	A	H	H	A	H	A	H	H	A	H	H	A
Result	D	L	D	D	L	W	W	D	L	W	W	D	L	D	D	W	L	W	D	L	L	D	L	D	L	W	W	D	W	L	D	W	D	L	W	W	W	W	D	L	W	D	D	W	D	W
Position	9	17	16	15	18	18	11	15	16	14	6	7	12	9	13	7	14	12	11	12	14	16	16	12	13	14	13	12	13	14	14	11	11	11	12	9	9	9	9	9	8	8	8	8	8	7

Source: 11v11.com
A = Away; H = Home; W = Win; D = Draw; L = Loss

==== League table ====
Pos	Team	Pld	W	D	L	GF	GA	GD	Pts
5	Swindon Town	46	25	7	14	74	52	+22	57
6	Carlisle United	46	15	22	9	53	42	+11	52
7	Colchester United	46	17	17	12	60	55	+5	51
8	Hull City	46	19	11	16	66	61	+5	49
9	Exeter City	46	17	15	14	61	56	+5	49

Source: rsssf.com

==== Matches ====
19 August 1978 1	Colchester United	2–2	Swansea City	Colchester
	Foley 28'; Rowles 75'	Report	James 55', 61'	Stadium: Layer Road; Attendance: 2,918; Referee: Ron Challis

21 August 1978 2	Brentford	1–0	Colchester United	Brentford
	Kruse 15'	Report		Stadium: Griffin Park; Attendance: 6,800; Referee: T Spencer

26 August 1978 3	Sheffield Wednesday	0–0	Colchester United	Sheffield
		Report		Stadium: Hillsborough Stadium; Attendance: 10,685; Referee: D Owen

2 September 1978 4	Colchester United	0–0	Rotherham United	Colchester
		Report		Stadium: Layer Road; Attendance: 2,448; Referee: John Homewood

8 September 1978 5	Carlisle United	4–0	Colchester United	Carlisle
	McCartney 5' (pen.); Bonnyman 12'; Hamilton 32'; Tait 44'	Report		Stadium: Brunton Park; Attendance: 4,430; Referee: R Chadwick

12 September 1978 6	Colchester United	2–1	Chester	Colchester
	Gough 63'; Cook 85'	Report	Phillips 62'	Stadium: Layer Road; Attendance: 2,311; Referee: Alf Grey

15 September 1978 7	Colchester United	1–0	Shrewsbury Town	Colchester
	Foley 67'	Report	Chapman (red card) 82'	Stadium: Layer Road; Attendance: 2,788; Referee: T Cox

23 September 1978 8	Walsall	2–2	Colchester United	Walsall
	King 22'; Buckley 73'	Report	Gough 51'; Foley 53'	Stadium: Fellows Park; Attendance: 4,052; Referee: E Read

27 September 1978 9	Exeter City	2–1	Colchester United	Exeter
	Kellow 5' (pen.); Bowker 75'	Report	Gough 24'	Stadium: St James Park; Attendance: 3,421

30 September 1978 10	Colchester United	3–1	Blackpool	Colchester
	Rowles 48'; Gough 78', 89'	Report	Hockaday 87'	Stadium: Layer Road; Attendance: 3,007; Referee: K Salmon

6 October 1978 11	Colchester United	3–2	Swindon Town	Colchester
	Rowles 53'; Evans 77'; Gough 89'	Report	Gilchrist 14'; Bates 43'	Stadium: Layer Road; Attendance: 3,324; Referee: C Maskell

13 October 1978 12	Lincoln City	0–0	Colchester United	Lincoln
		Report		Stadium: Sincil Bank; Attendance: 3,541; Referee: P Scott

18 October 1978 13	Chesterfield	2–1	Colchester United	Chesterfield
	Burton 48'; Walker 68'	Report	Dyer 54'	Stadium: Saltergate; Attendance: 4,394; Referee: B Hill

20 October 1978 14	Colchester United	1–1	Southend United	Colchester
	Evans 70'	Report	Laverick 41'	Stadium: Layer Road; Attendance: 5,881; Referee: A Glasson

28 October 1978 15	Mansfield Town	1–1	Colchester United	Mansfield
	Moss 82'	Report	Wignall 48'	Stadium: Field Mill; Attendance: 4,515; Referee: R Perkin

3 November 1978 16	Colchester United	2–1	Plymouth Argyle	Colchester
	Bunkell 75'; Gough 90'	Report	Binney 45'	Stadium: Layer Road; Attendance: 4,564; Referee: J Martin

11 November 1978 17	Rotherham United	1–0	Colchester United	Rotherham
	Finney 40'; Dawson (red card) 90'	Report	Packer (red card) 90'	Stadium: Millmoor; Attendance: 3,777; Referee: E Morrisey

18 November 1978 18	Colchester United	1–0	Sheffield Wednesday	Colchester
	Wignall 83'	Report		Stadium: Layer Road; Attendance: 4,346; Referee: Alan Gunn

9 December 1978 19	Colchester United	0–0	Bury	Colchester
		Report		Stadium: Layer Road; Attendance: 2,732; Referee: D Reeves

23 December 1978 20	Colchester United	0–1	Watford	Colchester
		Report	Jenkins 43'	Stadium: Layer Road; Attendance: 5,424; Referee: Alf Grey

26 December 1978 21	Oxford United	2–0	Colchester United	Oxford
	Foley 75'; Graydon 80' (pen.)	Report		Stadium: Manor Ground; Attendance: 4,892; Referee: Tom Bune

17 January 1979 22	Chester	2–2	Colchester United	Chester
	Henderson 24'; Phillips 75'	Report	Foley 32', 65'	Stadium: Sealand Road; Attendance: 2,339; Referee: K Butcher

19 January 1979 23	Shrewsbury Town	2–0	Colchester United	Shrewsbury
	Biggins 22'; Chapman 59'	Report		Stadium: Gay Meadow; Attendance: 2,119; Referee: D Shaw

2 February 1979 24	Colchester United	2–2	Exeter City	Colchester
	Roberts 39' (o.g.); Allinson 50' (pen.)	Report	Neville 64', 65'	Stadium: Layer Road; Attendance: 2,767; Referee: B Hill

10 February 1979 25	Blackpool	2–1	Colchester United	Blackpool
	Spence 21', 86'	Report	Allinson 54'	Stadium: Bloomfield Road; Attendance: 3,446; Referee: D Owen

23 February 1979 26	Colchester United	2–0	Lincoln City	Colchester
	Lee 60'; Hodge 80'	Report		Stadium: Layer Road; Attendance: 2,861; Referee: Colin Downey

27 February 1979 27	Colchester United	2–0	Walsall	Colchester
	Hodge 15'; Wignall 74'	Report		Stadium: Layer Road; Attendance: 3,135; Referee: T Cox

2 March 1979 28	Southend United	1–1	Colchester United	Southend-on-Sea
	Parker 63'	Report	Lee 75'	Stadium: Roots Hall; Attendance: 6,957; Referee: Alan Gunn

9 March 1979 29	Colchester United	1–0	Mansfield Town	Colchester
	Gough 18'	Report		Stadium: Layer Road; Attendance: 2,866; Referee: Malcolm Sinclair

13 March 1979 30	Hull City	1–0	Colchester United	Kingston upon Hull
	Stewart 87'	Report		Stadium: Boothferry Park; Attendance: 4,201; Referee: Pat Partridge

17 March 1979 31	Plymouth Argyle	1–1	Colchester United	Plymouth
	Binney 82'	Report	Dyer 2'	Stadium: Home Park; Attendance: 5,342; Referee: E Hughes

20 March 1979 32	Swindon Town	1–2	Colchester United	Swindon
	Rowland 57'	Report	Lee 63', 77'	Stadium: County Ground; Attendance: 6,678; Referee: A Hamil

24 March 1979 33	Colchester United	1–1	Brentford	Colchester
	Hodge 73' (pen.)	Report	Shrubb 66'	Stadium: Layer Road; Attendance: 3,528; Referee: J Bray

27 March 1979 34	Swansea City	4–1	Colchester United	Swansea
	Waddle 8', 48'; James 83'; Attley 90'	Report	Lee 90'	Stadium: Vetch Field; Attendance: 11,645; Referee: W Brombroff

31 March 1979 35	Peterborough United	1–2	Colchester United	Peterborough
	Robson 82'	Report	Gough 42'; Allinson 52'	Stadium: London Road Stadium; Attendance: 3,559; Referee: M Peck

2 April 1979 36	Colchester United	2–1	Carlisle United	Colchester
	Lee 85'; Wignall 87'	Report	Lumby 30'	Stadium: Layer Road; Attendance: 2,608; Referee: C White

6 April 1979 37	Colchester United	1–0	Tranmere Rovers	Colchester
	Lee 18'	Report		Stadium: Layer Road; Attendance: 2,578; Referee: David Hutchinson

13 April 1979 38	Watford	0–3	Colchester United	Watford
15:00 BST		Report	Lee 43', 57'; Gough 84'	Stadium: Vicarage Road; Attendance: 17,903; Referee: Ron Challis

14 April 1979 39	Colchester United	1–1	Oxford United	Colchester
	Gough 16'	Report	Taylor 76'	Stadium: Layer Road; Attendance: 3,892; Referee: C Maskell

16 April 1979 40	Gillingham	3–0	Colchester United	Gillingham
	Price 17'; Westwood 64'; Funnell 75'	Report		Stadium: Priestfield Stadium; Attendance: 12,030; Referee: A Robinson

21 April 1979 41	Colchester United	2–1	Hull City	Colchester
	Rowles 74'; Gough 84'	Report	Edwards 56'	Stadium: Layer Road; Attendance: 2,762; Referee: Rob Lewis

24 April 1979 42	Colchester United	0–0	Chesterfield	Colchester
		Report		Stadium: Layer Road; Attendance: 2,762; Referee: D Reeves

28 April 1979 43	Bury	2–2	Colchester United	Bury
	Hilton 23'; Wilson 46'	Report	Gough 6'; Wright 75'	Stadium: Gigg Lane; Attendance: 2,905; Referee: B Martin

4 May 1979 44	Colchester United	4–2	Peterborough United	Colchester
	Foley 11'; Allinson 61'; Dowman 77', 87'	Report	Guy 36'; Cooke 38'	Stadium: Layer Road; Attendance: 2,662; Referee: A Glasson

7 May 1979 45	Colchester United	2–2	Gillingham	Colchester
	Allinson 54'; Gough 78'	Report	Armstrong 9'; Westwood 53'	Stadium: Layer Road; Attendance: 6,317; Referee: John Homewood

9 May 1979 46	Tranmere Rovers	1–5	Colchester United	Birkenhead
	Peplow 71'	Report	Gough 20', 80'; Packer 46'; Lee 66', 74'	Stadium: Prenton Park; Attendance: 1,016; Referee: D Clarke

=== League Cup ===
12 August 1978 1st round 1st leg	Colchester United	2–3	Charlton Athletic	Colchester
	Rowles 30'; Dowman 90'	Report	Hales 8'; Brisley 78'; Robinson 82'	Stadium: Layer Road; Attendance: 3,016; Referee: R Toseland

15 August 1978 1st round 2nd leg	Charlton Athletic	0–0	Colchester United	Charlton
		Report		Stadium: The Valley; Attendance: 7,205
Note: Charlton won 3–2 on aggregate

=== FA Cup ===
25 November 1978 1st round	Colchester United	4–2	Oxford United	Colchester
	Gough 30', 74', 87'; Foley 46'	Report	Foley 22'; Seacole 53'	Stadium: Layer Road; Attendance: 4,170; Referee: C Maskell

16 December 1978 2nd round	Leatherhead	1–1	Colchester United	Leatherhead
15:00 GMT	Kelly 73'	Report	Gough 30'	Stadium: Fetcham Grove; Attendance: 2,250; Referee: P Reeves

19 December 1978 2nd round replay	Colchester United	4–0	Leatherhead	Colchester
	Lee 40'; Gough 67'; Dowman 68', 71'	Report		Stadium: Layer Road; Attendance: 3,920; Referee: P Reeves

9 January 1979 3rd round	Darlington	0–1	Colchester United	Darlington
		Report	Hodge 8'	Stadium: Feethams; Attendance: 3,465; Referee: D Mills

30 January 1979 4th round	Newport County	0–0	Colchester United	Newport
		Report		Stadium: Somerton Park; Attendance: 10,329; Referee: D Turner

5 February 1979 4th round replay	Colchester United	1–0	Newport County	Colchester
	Gough 26'	Report		Stadium: Layer Road; Attendance: 7,025; Referee: D Turner

20 February 1979 5th round	Colchester United	0–1	Manchester United	Colchester
19:30 GMT		Report	J. Greenhoff 85'	Stadium: Layer Road; Attendance: 13,171; Referee: Ron Challis

== Squad statistics ==
=== Appearances and goals ===
No.	Pos	Nat	Player	Total		Third Division		FA Cup		League Cup	
No.	Pos	Nat	Player	Apps	Goals	Apps	Goals	Apps	Goals	Apps	Goals
	GK	(Wales) WAL	Mike Walker	55	0	46	0	7	0	2	0
	DF	(England) ENG	Micky Cook	54	1	46	1	7	0	1	0
	DF	(England) ENG	Steve Dowman	47	5	37+1	2	7	2	2	1
	DF	(England) ENG	Mick Packer	49	1	40+2	1	5	0	2	0
	DF	(England) ENG	Steve Wignall	51	4	42	4	7	0	2	0
	DF	(England) ENG	Steve Wright	42	1	33+2	1	6+1	0	0	0
	MF	(England) ENG	Ray Bunkell	15	1	10+2	1	2	0	1	0
	MF	(England) ENG	Russell Cotton	1	0	1	0	0	0	0	0
	MF	(England) ENG	Paul Dyer	47	2	37+3	2	5	0	2	0
	MF	(England) ENG	Tony Evans	9	2	8+1	2	0	0	0	0
	MF	(England) ENG	Steve Foley	42	7	34	6	6	1	2	0
	MF	(England) ENG	Steve Leslie	4	0	3	0	0	0	1	0
	MF	(England) ENG	Eddie Rowles	23	5	19+2	4	0	0	2	1
	FW	(England) ENG	Ian Allinson	55	5	45+1	5	7	0	2	0
	FW	(England) ENG	Bobby Gough	50	22	42	16	6	6	2	0
	FW	(England) ENG	Bobby Hodge	38	4	31	3	7	1	0	0
	FW	(England) ENG	Trevor Lee	32	12	27	11	5	1	0	0
Players who appeared for Colchester who left during the season
	MF	(Northern Ireland) NIR	Pat Sharkey	8	0	5+1	0	0	0	1+1	0

=== Goalscorers ===
Place	Nationality	Position	Name	Third Division	FA Cup	League Cup	Total
1	(England)	FW	Bobby Gough	16	6	0	22
2	(England)	FW	Trevor Lee	11	1	0	12
3	(England)	MF	Steve Foley	6	1	0	7
4	(England)	WG	Ian Allinson	5	0	0	5
4	(England)	CB	Steve Dowman	2	2	1	5
4	(England)	MF	Eddie Rowles	4	0	1	5
7	(England)	WG	Bobby Hodge	3	1	0	4
7	(England)	CB	Steve Wignall	4	0	0	4
9	(England)	MF	Paul Dyer	2	0	0	2
9	(England)	MF	Tony Evans	2	0	0	2
11	(England)	MF	Ray Bunkell	1	0	0	1
11	(England)	FB	Micky Cook	1	0	0	1
11	(England)	FB	Mick Packer	1	0	0	1
11	(England)	CB	Steve Wright	1	0	0	1
			Own goals	1	0	0	1
			TOTALS	60	11	2	73

=== Disciplinary record ===
Nationality	Position	Name	Third Division		FA Cup		League Cup		Total	
Nationality	Position	Name	Yellow card	Red card	Yellow card	Red card	Yellow card	Red card	Yellow card	Red card
(England)	FB	Mick Packer	3	1	0	0	0	0	3	1
(England)	MF	Paul Dyer	1	0	0	0	0	0	1	0
(England)	CB	Steve Wignall	1	0	0	0	0	0	1	0
		TOTALS	5	1	0	0	0	0	5	1

=== Clean sheets ===
Number of games goalkeepers kept a clean sheet.

Place	Nationality	Player	Third Division	FA Cup	League Cup	Total
1	(Wales)	Mike Walker	12	4	1	17
		TOTALS	12	4	1	17

=== Player debuts ===
Players making their first-team Colchester United debut in a fully competitive match.

Position	Nationality	Player	Date	Opponent	Ground	Notes
MF	(Northern Ireland)	Pat Sharkey	12 August 1978	Charlton Athletic	Layer Road	
WG	(England)	Bobby Hodge	27 September 1978	Exeter City	St James Park	
FW	(England)	Trevor Lee	3 November 1978	Plymouth Argyle	Layer Road	

== See also ==
- List of Colchester United F.C. seasons
