= Phil Walker =

Phil Walker may refer to:

- Phil Walker (basketball) (born 1956), retired American basketball player
- Phil Walker (footballer, born 1954) (1954–2022), English football player for Millwall
- Phil Walker (footballer, born 1957), English football player for Chesterfield
- Phil Walker (journalist) (1944–2011), British newspaper editor

== See also ==
- Phillip Walker (disambiguation)
