= Gary Harvey =

Gary Harvey may refer to:

- Gary Harvey (director), Canadian television director and producer
- Gary Harvey (footballer) (born 1961), English former footballer
