= Keith Waugh =

English footballer

Personal information
- Date of birth: 27 October 1956 (age 70)
- Place of birth: Sunderland, England
- Position: Goalkeeper

Youth career
- 1971–1973: Sunderland

Senior career*
Years	Team	Apps	(Gls)
1973–1976	Sunderland	0	(0)
1976–1981	Peterborough United	195	(0)
1981–1985	Sheffield United	99	(0)
1984	→ Cambridge United (loan)	4	(0)
1984–1985	→ Bristol City (loan)	3	(0)
1985–1989	Bristol City	167	(0)
1989–1991	Coventry City	1	(0)
1990–1991	→ Watford (loan)	0	(0)
1991–1993	Watford	7	(0)
Total		476	(0)
- * Club domestic league appearances and goals

Keith Waugh (born 27 October 1956) is an English-born footballer who played as a goalkeeper in the Football League between the 1970s and 1990s, most notably with Peterborough United, Sheffield United and Bristol City.

He started as a trainee with Sunderland, but did not play any League games with them, and he moved to Peterborough United, first playing a league game for them in 1976–77. He went on to make 195 League appearances for The Posh.

He moved to Sheffield United in 1981 for a fee of £100,000, and made 99 League appearances for the club

He moved to Bristol City in the mid-1980s, although he had loan spells at Bristol City and Cambridge United during the 1984–85 season before his permanent move to The Robins.

Waugh was to make 167 League appearances for the Ashton Gate club (including appearing in the 1986 Football League Trophy Final) before a brief spell at Coventry City in the late 1980s. He then moved to Watford and made a total of 7 league appearances for them. On 23 March 1993 he was recalled to the Watford team for the first time in 14 months against Newcastle United, and put in an excellent performance in Watford's 1–0 victory. His final Football League appearance came against Charlton Athletic on 6 April 1993. After his playing career finished he remained at Watford as youth team coach.

== Honours ==
Sheffield United

- Football League Second Division promotion: 1983–84
- Football League Fourth Division: 1981–82

Bristol City

- Associate Members' Cup: 1985–86; runner-up: 1986–87
