= Still, We Believe: The Boston Red Sox Movie =

- Still, We Believe: The Boston Red Sox Movie
- Directed by: Paul Doyle Jr.
- Produced by: Daniel Carey, Peter Frechette, Michael Meyer, Bob Potter
- Starring: Joe Castiglione, Jim Connors, Steve Craven, Johnny Damon, Theo Epstein, Nomar Garciaparra, Grady Little, Derek Lowe, Larry Lucchino
- Cinematography: Anthony Flanagan
- Edited by: Paul Doyle Jr.
- Production companies: Bombo Sports & Entertainment
- Distributed by: Hart Sharp Video, ThinkFilm
- Release date: May 7, 2004 (US)
- Running time: 110 min.
- Country: United States
- Language: English
- Box office: $396,803 (domestic)

Still, We Believe: The Boston Red Sox Movie is a 2004 documentary/sport film documenting the Boston Red Sox' 2003 season and the team's relationship with its fans. It was directed by Paul Doyle Jr. and was first released on May 7, 2004 at the Loew’s Boston Common Theater in Boston, Massachusetts.

== Synopsis ==
The film documents the 2003 season of the Boston Red Sox, beginning with their annual spring training and culminating in the American League Championship Series. The documentary also looks into the team's fandom, as well as the team's interactions with their fans.

== Cast ==
- Joe Castiglione
- Jim Connors
- Paul Constine
- Steve Craven
- Dan Cummings
- Johnny Damon
- Theo Epstein
- Jermaine Evans
- Jessamy Finet
- Nomar Garciaparra
- John Henry
- Grady Little
- Derek Lowe
- Larry Lucchino
- Harry Mann

== Production ==
The film's title was chosen by Red Sox fans after the documentary's director asked them to choose an appropriate title from four available choices. Other alternate titles were This Is the Year, The Ecstasy and the Agony, and Always the Bridesmaid. One of the people interviewed for the movie, a fan by the name of Jessamy Finet, was later asked to perform in the 2005 film Fever Pitch based upon her role in Still, We Believe.

== Reception ==
Critical reception was mostly positive. The Hartford Courant gave an overly positive review, but remarked that "As good as Doyle's film is, he avoids the financial issues, betraying his lack of independence from Red Sox management, whose cooperation was essential and who probably had final cut." The review from the Boston Globe was also predominantly positive, but noted that the movie covered so much material that Doyle "never goes deep enough into the season or individual games; like the sped-up overhead shots of Fenway groundskeepers that punctuate the movie, "Believe" is always rushing to the next moment."
