= Gary Marshall =

Gary Marshall may refer to:

- Garry Marshall (1934–2016), American filmmaker and actor
- Gary Marshall (politician), American politician in Idaho
- Gary Marshall (footballer), English footballer
