= Jason Danskin =

English footballer

Personal information
- Full name: Jason Danskin
- Date of birth: 28 December 1967 (age 58)
- Place of birth: Winsford, England
- Height: 5 ft 8 in (1.73 m)
- Position: Midfielder

Senior career*
Years	Team	Apps	(Gls)
1984–1985	Everton	1	(0)
1986–1987	Mansfield Town	10	(0)
1987–1988	→ Hartlepool United (loan)	3	(0)
- Northwich Victoria
Total		14	(0)
- * Club domestic league appearances and goals

Jason Danskin (born 28 December 1967) is an English former footballer who played in the Football League for Everton, Hartlepool United and Mansfield Town. At Mansfield he helped them win the 1986–87 Associate Members' Cup, playing in the final.

== Honours ==
Mansfield Town

- Associate Members' Cup: 1986–87
