= Gary Pollard =

English footballer

Personal information
- Full name: Gary Pollard
- Date of birth: 30 December 1959 (age 66)
- Place of birth: Staveley, England
- Height: 6 ft 1 in (1.85 m)
- Position: Defender

Youth career
- Chesterfield

Senior career*
Years	Team	Apps	(Gls)
1977–1983	Chesterfield	87	(1)
1983–1984	Port Vale	18	(0)
1984–1987	Mansfield Town	67	(1)
1987–1989	Peterborough United	20	(0)
- → Eastwood Town (loan)
- → Goole Town (loan)
Total		192	(2)
- * Club domestic league appearances and goals

Gary Pollard (born 30 December 1959) is an English former footballer. A defender, he scored two goals in 192 league appearances in a 12-year career in the Football League. He played for Chesterfield, Port Vale, Mansfield Town, Peterborough United, Eastwood Town, and Goole Town. He was promoted out of the Fourth Division with Mansfield in 1985–86 and won the Football League Trophy with the club in 1987.

== Career ==
Pollard began his career at Chesterfield, who finished ninth in the Third Division in 1977–78. Arthur Cox's "Spireites" posted a 20th-place finish in 1978–79 before finishing one place and one point outside the promotion places in 1979–80. They finished fifth in 1980–81 under the stewardship of Frank Barlow, just three points short of promotion. They dropped down to 11th spot in 1981–82, before suffering relegation in last place in 1982–83. He spent six years as a professional at Saltergate and scored one goal in 87 league games. Pollard signed with John McGrath's Port Vale in June 1983. He played 18 Third Division games in the 1983–84 season, as the "Valiants" were relegated despite an improvement under new boss John Rudge. He left Vale Park and moved on to Ian Greaves's Mansfield Town on a free transfer in July 1984. The "Stags" finished 14th in the Fourth Division in 1984–85, and then secured promotion with a third-place finish in 1985–86. They secured a 10th-place finish in the Third Division in 1986–87. He was a late substitute for Jason Danskin in the 1987 League Trophy final at Wembley, and converted his penalty as Mansfield beat Bristol City in the penalty shoot-out. In his three years at Field Mill, Pollard scored two goals in 82 league and cup games. He moved on to Noel Cantwell's Peterborough United, helping the club to finish seventh in the Fourth Division in 1987–88, before new boss Mick Jones took them to a 17th-place finish in 1988–89. He only played 20 league games in his two years at London Road, and was loaned out to Northern Premier League sides Eastwood Town and Goole Town.

== Career statistics ==
Appearances and goals by club, season and competition
Club	Season	League			FA Cup		Other		Total	
Club	Season	Division	Apps	Goals	Apps	Goals	Apps	Goals	Apps	Goals
Chesterfield	1977–78	Third Division	19	0	0	0	2	0	21	0
Chesterfield	1978–79	Third Division	1	0	0	0	0	0	1	0
Chesterfield	1979–80	Third Division	1	0	0	0	0	0	1	0
Chesterfield	1980–81	Third Division	17	0	6	0	4	0	27	0
Chesterfield	1981–82	Third Division	17	0	2	0	1	0	20	0
Chesterfield	1982–83	Third Division	32	1	1	0	1	0	34	1
Chesterfield	Total		87	1	9	0	8	0	104	1
Port Vale	1983–84	Third Division	18	0	1	0	3	0	22	0
Mansfield Town	1984–85	Fourth Division	18	0	1	0	6	0	25	0
Mansfield Town	1985–86	Fourth Division	35	1	2	0	5	1	42	1
Mansfield Town	1986–87	Third Division	14	0	0	0	5	0	19	0
Mansfield Town	Total		67	1	3	0	16	1	86	2
Peterborough United	1987–88	Fourth Division	12	0	0	0	4	0	16	0
Peterborough United	1988–89	Fourth Division	8	0	0	0	0	0	8	0
Peterborough United	Total		20	0	0	0	4	0	24	0
Career total			192	2	13	0	31	1	236	3

== Honours ==
Mansfield Town

- Football League Fourth Division third-place promotion: 1985–86
- Associate Members' Cup: 1986–87
