= David Harle =

English footballer

Personal information
- Full name: David Harle
- Date of birth: 15 August 1963 (age 63)
- Place of birth: Denaby, England
- Height: 5 ft 9 in (1.75 m)
- Position: Midfielder

Senior career*
Years	Team	Apps	(Gls)
1979–1982	Doncaster Rovers	61	(3)
1982–1983	Exeter City	43	(6)
1983–1985	Doncaster Rovers	83	(17)
1985–1986	Leeds United	3	(0)
1986–1987	Bristol City	23	(2)
1987–1989	Scunthorpe United	89	(10)
1989–1990	Peterborough United	22	(2)
1990–1992	Doncaster Rovers	45	(3)
Total		369	(43)

International career
1982	England Youth	1	(0)
- * Club domestic league appearances and goals

David Harle (born 15 August 1963) is an English former footballer who played in the Football League for Doncaster Rovers, Exeter City, Leeds United, Bristol City, Scunthorpe United and Peterborough United.

He had a short career in non-league football with Goole and Mossley in 1992–93 before he subsequently worked for the Council in Doncaster.

== Honours ==
Bristol City

- Associate Members' Cup: 1985–86
