= John MacPhail =

Scottish footballer

Personal information
- Full name: John MacPhail
- Date of birth: 7 December 1955 (age 70)
- Place of birth: Dundee, Scotland
- Height: 6 ft 0 in (1.83 m)
- Position: Defender

Senior career*
Years	Team	Apps	(Gls)
1975–1979	Dundee	68	(0)
1978–1983	Sheffield United	135	(7)
1983–1986	York City	142	(24)
1986–1987	Bristol City	26	(1)
1987–1990	Sunderland	130	(22)
1990–1994	Hartlepool United	163	(4)
Total		664	(58)

Managerial career
- 1993–1994: Hartlepool United
- * Club domestic league appearances and goals

John MacPhail (born 7 December 1955) is a Scottish former footballer who played as a defender.

== Career ==
Born in Dundee, Scotland, MacPhail started out at St Columba BC before moving to Dundee. From Dundee MacPhail journeyed south to Sheffield United. He stayed at United for five years, making 135 appearances and forming an effective partnership in central defence with Tony Kenworthy.

MacPhail moved on in 1983 and won the York City Clubman of the Year award two seasons running, winning the 1983–84 and 1984–85 awards. MacPhail left York for Bristol City in July 1986. A year later he was re-united with former boss, Denis Smith at Sunderland. He captained Sunderland to two promotions as they returned to First Division in 1990. His only top flight appearance was on the opening day of the 1990–91 season. He left Sunderland for Hartlepool United, initially as a player. He was appointed player/manager of Hartlepool on 24 November 1993 and was sacked on 9 September 1994.

== Honours ==
Sheffield United

- Football League Fourth Division: 1981–82

York City

- Football League Fourth Division: 1983–84

Bristol City

- Associate Members' Cup runner-up: 1986–87

Sunderland

- Football League Third Division: 1987–88
