= Phillip Walker =

Phillip Walker may refer to:

- Phillip Walker (musician) (1937–2010), American blues guitarist
- Phillip Walker (politician), American politician
- P. J. Walker (born 1995), American football quarterback
- Phillip Walker House, historic American Colonial house in Rhode Island

== See also ==
- Phil Walker (disambiguation)
