= Trenton Wiggan =

Jamaican footballer (born 1962)

Personal information
- Full name: Trenton Ashton Wiggan
- Date of birth: 20 September 1962 (age 64)
- Place of birth: Jamaica
- Height: 5 ft 10 in (1.78 m)
- Position: Forward

Youth career
- Sheffield United

Senior career*
Years	Team	Apps	(Gls)
1979–1982	Sheffield United	24	(3)
1982–1983	Gainsborough Trinity		
1983–1986	Scarborough	124	(25)
- Frickley Athletic
- Gainsborough Trinity
1991–1992	Bishop Auckland		
1992–1993	Buxton		

International career
1978	England Schoolboys	4	(0)
- * Club domestic league appearances and goals

Trenton Ashton Wiggan (born 20 September 1962) is a retired footballer who played primarily as a forward. Born in Jamaica, he moved to England as a child and represented his adopted country at schoolboy international level, and played in the Football League for Sheffield United before moving on to a number of clubs in non-league.

== Career ==
Wiggan was a product of Sheffield United's youth system and had appeared for England Schoolboys when made his first team debut as a 16-year-old amateur in August 1979, appearing as a substitute in a League Cup fixture against Doncaster Rovers. Turning professional, Wiggan began to play regularly during the 1980–81 season that saw the Blades relegated from Division Three. Having started a few games in the early part of the following season, Wiggan soon lost his place and was eventually released in the summer of 1982.

Wiggan joined non-league Gainsborough Trinity where he remained for a year before joining Scarborough in the summer of 1983. Following three seasons with the east coast club, Wiggan had spells at a succession of clubs; Frickley Athletic, a second spell at Gainsborough, Bishop Auckland and Buxton before retiring from playing in 1993.
