= Nigel Crouch =

English footballer

Personal information
- Full name: Nigel John Crouch
- Date of birth: 24 November 1958 (age 67)
- Place of birth: Ardleigh, England
- Height: 5 ft 8 in (1.73 m)
- Position: Full-back

Youth career
- 1976–1978: Ipswich Town

Senior career*
Years	Team	Apps	(Gls)
1978–1980	Ipswich Town	0	(0)
1979	→ Lincoln City (loan)	7	(0)
1980–1981	Colchester United	10	(0)
- Harwich & Parkeston
- Brantham Athletic
- Mistley
Total		17	(0)
- * Club domestic league appearances and goals

Nigel John Crouch (born 24 November 1958) is an English former professional footballer who played as a full-back in the Football League for Lincoln City on loan from Ipswich Town, and for Colchester United.

Crouch began his career with Ipswich, where he progressed through the youth team. He earned a professional contract in 1978, but failed to make a first-team appearance for the Suffolk club. He was loaned out to Lincoln City in 1979, where he made his professional debut, going on to make seven appearances. Following his release from Ipswich in the summer of 1980, he joined local rivals Colchester United, where he became the club's first-ever player to be sent off on his debut. He went on to make ten further league appearances for the U's, but he was released at the end of the season. He would later go on to represent non-League clubs Harwich & Parkeston, Brantham Athletic and Mistley.

== Career ==
Crouch, born in Ardleigh, Essex, began his career with Ipswich Town in 1976, joining up with the youth team at the age of 17. He made 17 reserve team appearances for the club during the 1976–77 season and made 33 appearances in the 1977–78 season.

Crouch signed his first professional deal with Ipswich in November 1978, making a further 34 reserve team appearances that season in addition to appearing alongside first-team regulars in Trevor Whymark's testimonial match on 5 February 1979 against Norwich City in a team managed by Bobby Robson.

In August 1979, Crouch was loaned out to Fourth Division side Lincoln City. He made his Football League debut on 18 August 1979 in Lincoln's 1–0 home defeat by Peterborough United. He went on to make seven appearances for the Imps, playing his seventh and final match on 18 September, a 3–0 defeat at Walsall.

On his return to Ipswich, Crouch found himself back in the reserves, playing 27 games while also featuring for Town in a 1–0 friendly win against the New Zealand national team on 17 October 1979.

Crouch left Ipswich in the summer of 1980 and was brought to Third Division side Colchester United by manager Bobby Roberts. He had a memorable debut for the club on 9 August 1980 when he became the first U's player to be sent off on their debut. He had retaliated to a challenge by Gillingham's Steve Bruce in their League Cup first round first-leg 2–0 defeat at Layer Road. Following nine consecutive league appearances through September and October 1980, Crouch found his opportunities limited, and played just once more for Colchester on 18 April 1981, when his side drew 0–0 with Gillingham at Priestfield. He was released by the club at the end of the season.

On the back of his release from Colchester, Crouch moved into non-League football with Harwich & Parkeston and then Brantham Athletic, experiencing long spells with both clubs. He later finished his career with Mistley in the Essex and Suffolk Border League.

== Career statistics ==
Appearances and goals by club, season and competition
Club	Season	League			FA Cup		League Cup		Other		Total	
Club	Season	Division	Apps	Goals	Apps	Goals	Apps	Goals	Apps	Goals	Apps	Goals
Ipswich Town	1979–80	First Division Division	0	0	0	0	0	0	0	0	0	0
Lincoln City (loan)	1979–80	Fourth Division	7	0	0	0	0	0	0	0	7	0
Colchester United	1980–81	Third Division	10	0	0	0	1	0	0	0	11	0
Career total			17	0	0	0	1	0	0	0	18	0

== Personal life ==
Crouch is brother-in-law former Colchester player and caretaker manager Steve Foley. Crouch's son Ross was also a member of Colchester's youth team setup. He was an apprentice between 2001 and 2004, and had represented the under-19 team while just 14-years-old. After captaining the youth team, Ross was handed a professional one-year contract by Colchester manager Phil Parkinson in April 2004. After leaving Colchester and playing for Halstead Town, and being named in the Gazette Non-League Team of the Year in 2008 while playing for Stanway Rovers, Ross was tragically killed in May 2008 after being struck by a car while walking home. In memory of Ross, a stand at Brantham Athletic's ground was named after him, officially opened by his uncle Steve Foley in a match between his two former sides Brantham and Stanway Rovers.
