= David Pullar =

English footballer and publican

Personal information
- Full name: David Harry Pullar
- Date of birth: 13 February 1959 (age 67)
- Place of birth: Durham, England
- Height: 5 ft 11 in (1.80 m)
- Position: Winger

Senior career*
Years	Team	Apps	(Gls)
- Selsey
1977–1979	Portsmouth	93	(4)
1979–1983	Exeter City	130	(22)
1983–1987	Crewe Alexandra	132	(7)
1987–?	Waterlooville		
Total		355	(33)
- * Club domestic league appearances and goals

David Harry Pullar (born 13 February 1959) is an English former footballer who played as a winger in the Football League for Portsmouth, Exeter City and Crewe Alexandra.

Pullar was born in Durham and moved to Selsey at the age of 14. He played for Selsey F.C. in the West Sussex League before joining Portsmouth as an apprentice. He made his debut in a Second Division match against Leyton Orient on 13 April 1976 and earned a professional contract in February 1977.

Pullar joined Exeter City in July 1979 and made his debut against Grimsby Town in the first match of the 1979–80 season. He missed just three matches in his first season at, helping the club to an eighth-place finish. The following season, he was part of the side that reached the quarter-finals of the FA Cup. He moved to Crewe Alexandra in 1983, spending four seasons with the Cheshire club.

After leaving Crewe Alexandra in 1978, he joined Waterlooville. He later became a publican in Rowland's Castle.
