= Alan Birch (footballer) =

English footballer (born 1956)

Personal information
- Full name: Alan Birch
- Date of birth: 12 August 1956 (age 70)
- Place of birth: West Bromwich, England
- Height: 5 ft 6 in (1.68 m)
- Position: Winger

Senior career*
Years	Team	Apps	(Gls)
1972–1979	Walsall	171	(23)
1979–1981	Chesterfield	90	(35)
1981–1982	Wolverhampton Wanderers	15	(0)
1982–1983	Barnsley	44	(10)
1983–1984	Chesterfield	32	(5)
1984–1986	Rotherham United	101	(28)
1986–1987	Scunthorpe United	23	(2)
1987–1988	Stockport County	20	(3)
- Frickley Athletic
Total		496	(106)
- * Club domestic league appearances and goals

Alan Birch (born 12 August 1956) is an English former professional footballer who played as a winger, making over 400 career appearances.

== Career ==
Born in West Bromwich, Birch played for Walsall, Chesterfield, Wolverhampton Wanderers, Barnsley, Rotherham United, Scunthorpe United, Stockport County and Frickley Athletic.

== Personal life ==
His brother Paul played for Aston Villa and Wolverhampton Wanderers.
