= Brian Williams (footballer, born 1955) =

English footballer

Personal information
- Full name: Brian Williams
- Date of birth: 5 November 1955 (age 70)
- Place of birth: Salford, England
- Height: 5 ft 9 in (1.75 m)
- Position: Winger

Senior career*
Years	Team	Apps	(Gls)
1973–1977	Bury	159	(19)
1977–1978	Queens Park Rangers	19	(0)
1978–1981	Swindon Town	99	(8)
1981–1985	Bristol Rovers	172	(21)
1985–1987	Bristol City	77	(3)
1987–1991	Shrewsbury Town	65	(1)
1991–????	Alvechurch		
Total		591	(52)
- * Club domestic league appearances and goals

Brian Williams (born 5 November 1955) is a former professional footballer who played in a total of 591 games for six different clubs in The Football League during an eighteen-year career spanning the period from 1973 to 1991.

Williams, who was originally from Salford, started his career as an apprentice with one of his local sides, Bury, turning professional with them in 1973. He went on to make 159 league appearances with the Lancashire club, and scored 19 goals before leaving to join Queens Park Rangers for a single season in 1977. He began a nine-year spell in the West Country in 1978, spending three years with Swindon Town, four years with Bristol Rovers, and two with Bristol City, becoming one of the few players to represent both sides in Bristol derbies in the process. His transfer from Swindon to Bristol Rovers was a swap deal, with midfielder Gary Emmanuel moving in the opposite direction. Whilst at Swindon Brian was fondly known as "Animal".

His final League club was Shrewsbury Town, who he represented between 1987 and 1991. He then joined non-League side Alvechurch, just two years before they folded in 1993.

Following his playing retirement, Williams worked as a "Football in the Community" officer, first for Hereford United and then his former club Shrewsbury Town until is final retirement in December 2015.

== Honours ==
Bristol City

- Associate Members' Cup: 1985–86; runner-up: 1986–87
