= John Bartley (footballer) =

English footballer

Personal information
- Full name: John Reginald Bartley
- Date of birth: 15 September 1958 (age 68)
- Place of birth: Camberwell, England
- Height: 5 ft 9 in (1.75 m)
- Position: Forward

Senior career*
Years	Team	Apps	(Gls)
1975–1980	Welling United	326	(450)
1980–1982	Millwall	40	(8)
1982	Kuopion Elo	8	(5)
1982–1984	Maidstone United	98	(72)
1984–1986	Welling United	75	(76)
1986–1987	Maidstone United	16	(13)
1987–1988	Chelmsford City	27	(21)
1988–1989	Dartford	38	(31)
1989–1991	Alma Swanley	86	(86)
- * Club domestic league appearances and goals

John Reginald Bartley (born 15 September 1958) is an English former professional footballer who played in the English Football League as a forward. He was a prolific scorer, scoring over 500 goals for Welling United.

== Career ==
Bartley began his career with Welling United, where he played as a youth. For the under-18s, he scored 64 goals in 40 games. He debuted for the first team in the 1974–75 season in the Athenian League and continued to play for both the senior and youth teams the following season. For both teams in 1975-76, he scored 113 goals. For the next five seasons, his average scoring remained over a goal per game. For Welling, he scored 450 goals in 326 appearances.

Thanks to his prolific goalscoring, Bartley signed for Second Division Millwall for £12,000 in 1980, but failed to score consistently. After a brief spell in Finland, he then joined Maidstone United in the Alliance Premier League for around £5,000. With Maidstone, he finished second and then won the league in 1983–84.

Bartley returned to Welling in 1984–85 for a club record fee of £8,000 and won the championship in 1985-86, scoring 60 goals in 58 appearances, 57 of those goals in 55 league appearances. He left Welling after a disagreement and returned to Maidstone. Bartley then played for Chelmsford City in the Southern League. After their relegation, Bartley moved to Dartford for £6,000. He finished his career at Alma Swanley in the Kent League, scoring 86 goals in 86 games. Bartley scored around 770 goals and 100 hattricks throughout his career.

== Sources ==
- Profile at Neil Brown
