= Richard Dawson (footballer, born 1960) =

English footballer

Personal information
- Full name: Richard Dawson
- Date of birth: 19 January 1960
- Place of birth: Chesterfield, Derbyshire, England
- Date of death: 9 August 2020 (aged 60)
- Position: Forward

Senior career*
Years	Team	Apps	(Gls)
1978–1981	Rotherham United	24	(3)
1981–1982	Doncaster Rovers	43	(14)
1982	Chesterfield	12	(0)
1982–1983	Scarborough		
1983-1984	Gainsborough Trinity		
1984–1986	Kettering Town	80	(5)
1986–1988	Matlock Town		
1988	Staveley MW		
Total		79	(17)
- * Club domestic league appearances and goals

Richard Dawson (19 January 1960 – 9 August 2020) was an English professional footballer who made his professional debut representing Rotherham United in 1978.

== Career ==
Dawson began his playing career at Rotherham United. After making twenty-one league starts and a further three as a substitute and netting three times he was poached by local rivals Doncaster Rovers in February 1981 to help with their 1980-81 promotion push. He made his debut in a home win against Hereford United with Doncaster Rovers winning three goals to one. In his first season with Doncaster Rovers they won promotion from Division Four, with Dawson finding the back of the net six times before the end of the season. During the 1981–1982 season he was Doncaster Rovers' top scorer with eight in all competitions. His home team Chesterfield signed Dawson in 1983 on a series of monthly contracts to help dig them out of a hole. The club's circumstances at the time made it difficult for Richard to make a good go of it and he signed for Scarborough in December 1982

== Personal life ==
After ending his playing career in 1988, Dick became a HGV truck driver. During the 1990s he drove for the same firm as former Sunderland legend Joe Bolton and Sheffield United goal machine Keith Edwards.
