= Leo Cusenza =

English footballer

Personal information
- Full name: Leo Calogero Cusenza
- Date of birth: 20 February 1963 (age 63)
- Place of birth: Edmonton, London, England
- Position: Defender

Youth career
- Colchester United

Senior career*
| Years | Team | Apps | (Gls) |
| 1980 | Colchester United | 1 | (0) |
| 1981 | Harlow Town | 389 | (15) |
| Total | | 390 | (15) |
- * Club domestic league appearances and goals

Leo Calogero Cusenza (born 20 February 1963) is an English former footballer who played for Football League club Colchester United as a defender. Is now involved coaching local Football for Cuffley Youth FC after having passed his coaching accreditations

== Career ==
Born in Edmonton, London, Cusenza joined Colchester United as a schoolboy. He made one appearance for the first-team in a 2–0 League Cup defeat to Gillingham on 9 August 1980. He went on to nearly 400 appearances for Harlow Town after leaving Colchester. and now coaches in local football in Hertfordshire after attaining his coaching accreditations
