= Steve Craven =

English Footballer

Steve Craven (born 17 September 1957, Birkenhead) is a footballer who played as midfielder for Tranmere Rovers and Crewe Alexandra.
