= Steve Neville =

English footballer (born 1957)

Steve Neville (born 18 September 1957) is an English former professional footballer. He is assistant coach at Sorrento FC in Perth, Western Australia. In his 14-season career in the English Football League, he played in 494 games, in which he scored 135 goals for Southampton, Sheffield United, Bristol City and in three spells at Exeter City. In England he was part of two divisional title-winning teams and was a winner of the Football League Trophy. Near the end of his playing career, he picked up a league champions medal while playing for South China AA in Hong Kong.

== Playing career ==
=== Southampton ===
Neville began his career as an apprentice with Southampton. He made half a dozen league appearances for Saints in 1977–78. Managed by Lawrie McMenemy, Southampton finished that season as runners up in England's second tier, earning promotion to English football's top flight.

=== Exeter City (first spell) ===
Aged 20, Neville signed for Exeter City in the summer of 1978. This coincided with the beginning of three of the best seasons in the club's history in terms of league finishes. The three-season spell of Third Division finishes of 9th, 8th and 11th have only been bettered by the club in the early 1930s. He was a regular during the club's stay in the third tier, in which he hit 22 goals in his 93 league games. Exeter also enjoyed some creditable cup runs. In Neville's first season there, they included League Cup wins against Bolton Wanderers and Blackburn Rovers before being knocked out in the fourth round by Graham Taylor's resurgent Watford. The next season Exeter reached the same stage knocking out Birmingham City en route before losing 2–0 to Liverpool at Anfield.

=== Sheffield United ===
He joined a Sheffield United side mid-season in 1980 who failed to hold their place in the Third Division. The season after, The Blades bounced back to win the 1981–82 Fourth Division title under Ian Porterfield's management.

=== Exeter City (second spell) ===
Aged 22, in the 1982 close season he rejoined Exeter. The team had already peaked, though, and Exeter did not reach the heights they did in Neville's first spell there. Exeter were relegated in 1983–84, the season of the ill-fated reign of Gerry Francis. In his 92 league games, Neville scored 27 goals.

=== Bristol City ===
In another mid-season transfer he joined Bristol City in 1984 signed by Terry Cooper. In his late 20s, it was here Neville was to play the highest-level football of his career. The Robins were competitive in the Third Division throughout Neville's time there, challenging for promotion with finishes of 5th, 9th and 6th. In his fourth season there, Bristol City finished fifth, meriting a place in the playoffs, where Walsall ultimately won the final. Neville hit 40 goals from his 134 league games.

=== Exeter City (third spell) ===
Aged 31, he rejoined Exeter for a third spell in the summer of 1988. Neville was again under Cooper's management. In 1989–90 Exeter also enjoyed another League Cup run where Swansea, Blackpool and Blackburn were eliminated as Exeter reached the fourth round again. They were knocked out by Sunderland in a replay after drawing 2–2 at home.

Neville helped the club win promotion back to Division Three in 1990.

In this spell Neville played in 120 Exeter first team league games, in which he scored 39 goals. In total for Exeter in the League, he played in 305 games and scored 98 league goals.

=== South China ===
In 1991 Neville left to play for South China AA, the historically most successful club in the Hong Kong league. South China ended the season as champions. In what has been described as a great period for Hong Kong domestic football,

== Coaching career ==
In 1993 he joined Western Australian state league side Sorrento as a coach. He is still in this role for the 2020 NPL Season.

== Honours ==
Sheffield United

- Football League Fourth Division: 1981–82

Bristol City

- Associate Members' Cup: 1985–86

Exeter City

- Football League Fourth Division: 1989–90

Individual

- PFA Team of the Year: 1989–90 Fourth Division
