= Gary Marshall (footballer) =

English professional footballer

Personal information
- Full name: Gary Marshall
- Date of birth: 20 April 1964 (age 62)
- Place of birth: Bristol, England
- Height: 5 ft 11 in (1.80 m)
- Position: Winger

Youth career
- Exeter City
- Shepton Mallet Town

Senior career*
| Years | Team | Apps | (Gls) |
| 1983–1988 | Bristol City | 68 | (7) |
| 1984 | → Torquay United (loan) | 7 | (1) |
| 1988–1989 | Carlisle United | 21 | (2) |
| 1989–1990 | Scunthorpe United | 41 | (3) |
| 1990–1992 | Exeter City | 60 | (6) |
| 1992–1993 | Clevedon Town | | |
- * Club domestic league appearances and goals

Gary Marshall (born 20 April 1964) is an English former footballer who made nearly 200 appearances in the Football League playing as a winger for Bristol City, Torquay United, Carlisle United, Scunthorpe United and Exeter City.

== Honours ==
Bristol City

- Associate Members' Cup runner-up: 1986–87
