= Tony Ward (referee) =

English football referee

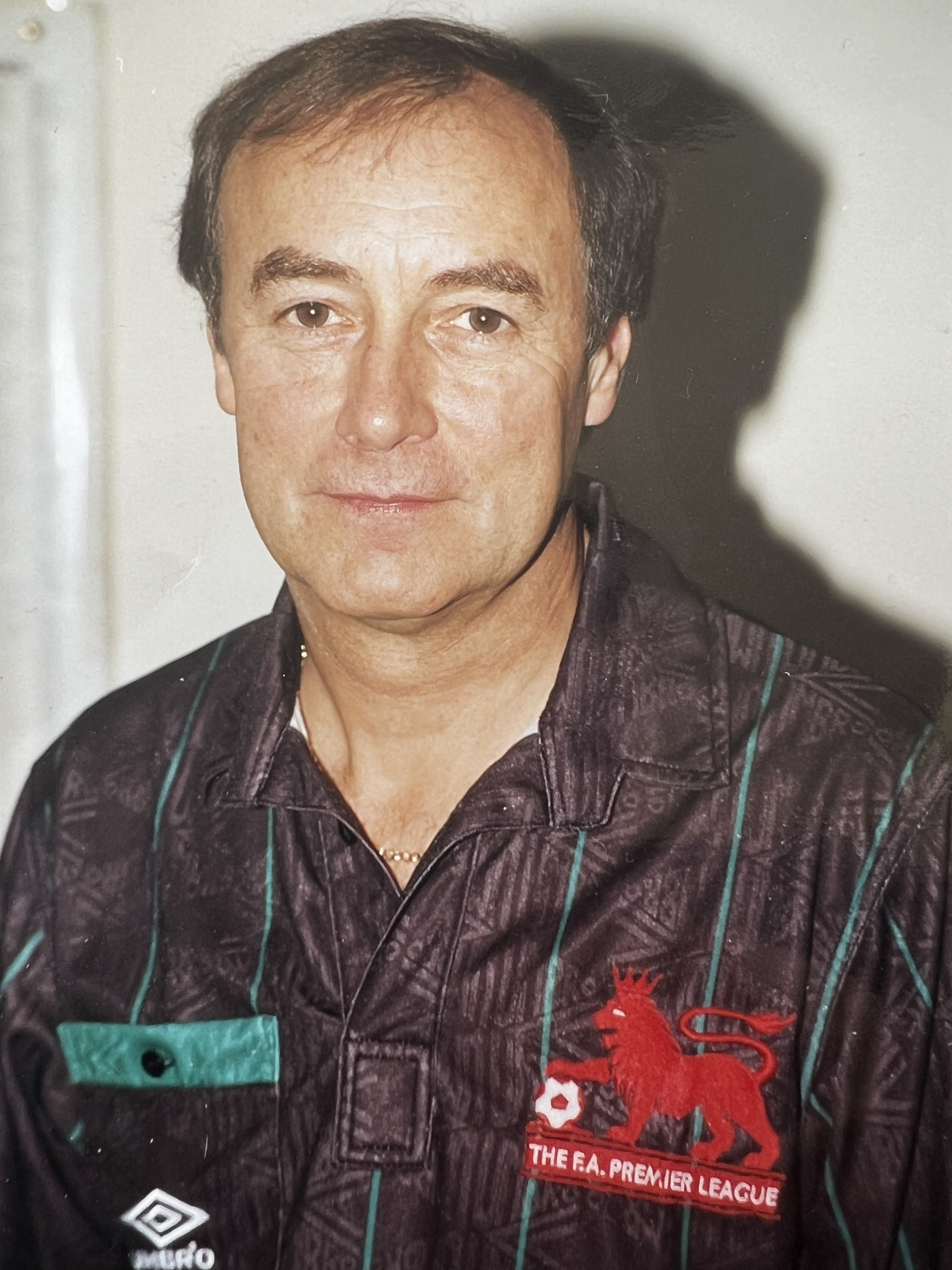
- Ward in 1993
- Born: 5 December 1941 (age 84)

Domestic
Years	League	Role
1962	South East Counties, Spartan, Athenian and Isthmian leagues	
1974	Football League	Linesman
1990	Football League	Referee

Tony Ward (born 5 December 1941 in Highgate, London) is a former football referee and assistant referee. During his career he officiated in the English Football League and Premier League, as well as in FIFA-sanctioned matches. He resided in New Southgate, London.

== Career ==
Ward started his career in 1962, serving the South East Counties, Spartan, Athenian and Isthmian leagues, before becoming a Football League linesman in 1974. His first match was a Second Division game between Portsmouth and Nottingham Forest. In 1980, he was promoted to the Referees List of the Football League; his first match was between Lincoln City and Wigan Athletic.

Ward reached the normal retirement age of 48 in 1990, but he was retained for a further three seasons along with other high-performing referees. He did not have Premier League appointments initially on its formation in 1992-1993 but was regularly chosen for matches in the second half of the season. His final match was Liverpool v Coventry City in April 1993.

When Arsenal moved from Highbury to the Emirates Stadium in 2006, he was appointed Arsenal’s Hon Referees Liaison Officer.

=== Appointments ===
Ward's notable appointments include:

- FA trophy Final at Wembley between Altrincham and Runcorn
- FA Vase Final 1979
- Football League Cup Semifinal 1993
- West Germany vs Brazil (Linesman) 1981
- Reserve referee football league cup final 1989
- Linesman European cup winners cup final 1989 Barcelona vs Sampdoria (referee George Courtney)

=== Testimonial Matches ===
In addition to Robin Wainwright and George Parish, Ward refereed testimonial matches for:

- Glenn Hoddle
- Ossie Ardiles
- Pat Jennings
- Ray Clemence
- Chris Hughton
- Ron "Chopper" Harris
- Tony Gale
- Ray Kennedy
- Graham Rix
- Tony Adams
- Ron Hillyard
- Terry Gibson
- Barry Fry
- Danny Blanchflower
- Eddie Baily
- David O'Leary
- Michael Watson
- Alan Nelmes
- Mick Leach
- Ray Kennedy
- Keith Millen
- Tony Gale

=== Deliberate handball ===
Ward became the first referee to dismiss a player for deliberate handball when he sent off Reading player Lawrie Sanchez in a match against Oxford in August 1982. Ten days later he dismissed Colin Todd of Nottingham Forest against Manchester United; Todd became the first Division One player to be sent off for handball.

=== Numbers board ===
As fourth official for England v Ireland in 1986 Ward was the first official to use the numbers board for substitutions, the referee was Clive Thomas of Wales.

== Private life ==
He married in August 1963, and has two children and four grandchildren. He worked for 35 years for Mirror Group Newspapers. He is a keen follower of cricket and baseball.
