= Glyn Riley =

English footballer

Personal information
- Date of birth: 24 July 1958 (age 68)
- Place of birth: Barnsley, England
- Height: 5 ft 10 in (1.78 m)
- Position: Striker

Youth career
- Barnsley

Senior career*
Years	Team	Apps	(Gls)
1974–1982	Barnsley	131	(16)
1980	→ Doncaster Rovers (loan)	8	(2)
1982–1987	Bristol City	199	(61)
1987	→ Torquay United (loan)	6	(1)
1987–1989	Aldershot	58	(5)
- Bath City
Total		402	(85)
- * Club domestic league appearances and goals

Glyn Riley (born 24 July 1958) is an English former professional footballer who played as a striker.

== Career ==
Born in Barnsley, Riley played for Barnsley, Doncaster Rovers, Bristol City, Torquay United, Aldershot and Bath City. Riley's effervescent playing style made him a popular figure amongst fans. His cult status was cemented in 1986 when Bristol City played at Wembley for the first time in their history. Riley scored two goals as Bristol City beat Bolton Wanderers 3–0 in the Football League Trophy final.

== Honours ==
Bristol City

- Associate Members' Cup: 1985–86; runner-up: 1986–87
