= Gary Harvey (footballer) =

English footballer

Personal information
- Full name: Gary Harvey
- Date of birth: 19 November 1961 (age 64)
- Place of birth: Colchester, England
- Position: Forward

Youth career
- Colchester United

Senior career*
Years	Team	Apps	(Gls)
1979–1981	Colchester United	6	(2)
- Kongsvinger
- Haverhill Rovers
2 spells at the club	Wivenhoe Town	Total 66	(Total 17)
- Harwich & Parkeston
- Tiptree United
- Chelmsford City
- Braintree Town
- Clacton Town
- Sudbury Wanderers

Managerial career
- –1999: Brightlingsea United
- 2003–2006: AFC Sudbury
- * Club domestic league appearances and goals

Gary Harvey (born 19 March 1957) is an English former footballer who played in the Football League as a forward for Colchester United. He is also joint owner of engineering company, MEL Aviation.

== Playing career ==
Born in Colchester, Harvey joined local club Colchester United as an apprentice, making his first team debut on 19 April 1980 in a 0–0 Third Division draw with Millwall. He scored his only goals for the club in the following match, scoring twice in a 3–2 victory over Swindon Town before being substituted for Tony Evans on 22 April 1980. He made a total of six appearances for Colchester alongside scoring his two goals, making his final appearance on 30 August 1980 in a 4–0 away defeat to Exeter City. After leaving Colchester, Harvey played for Kongsvinger, Haverhill Rovers, Wivenhoe Town, Harwich & Parkeston, Tiptree United, Chelmsford City, Braintree Town, Clacton Town and Sudbury Wanderers.

== Managerial career ==
Following his retirement from playing, Harvey went on to manage Brightlingsea United, before resigning in October 1999. In 2003, Harvey was appointed manager of AFC Sudbury. During Harvey's time at the club he guided Sudbury to two consecutive FA Vase finals, before retiring from management in April 2006.

== Other interests ==
At the age of 19, Harvey began running an engineering company, MEL Aviation, with Nick Smith and became joint owner.
