= Phil Walker (footballer, born 1957) =

English footballer

Personal information
- Full name: Philip Albert Walker
- Date of birth: 27 January 1957 (age 69)
- Place of birth: Kirkby-in-Ashfield, England
- Height: 6 ft 1 in (1.85 m)
- Position: Forward

Senior career*
Years	Team	Apps	(Gls)
1977–1983	Chesterfield	166	(38)
1982–1984	Rotherham United	25	(3)
1983–1984	→ Cardiff City (loan)	2	(0)
1984–1986	Chesterfield	38	(9)
1987–1988	Scarborough	1	(0)
Total		232	(50)
- * Club domestic league appearances and goals

Philip Albert Walker (born 27 January 1957) is an English former footballer who played in the Football League for Chesterfield, Rotherham United, Cardiff City and Scarborough.

He now coaches children at Center Parcs in Sherwood Forest, Nottingham and has been there since it opened in 1988.

Following his son's recovery from lymphoma, he has arranged a series of charity football matches raising well over £100,000. In April 2017 he became a magistrate.

== Honours ==
Chesterfield

- Football League Fourth Division: 1984–85
