= Tony Kenworthy =

English footballer and manager

Personal information
- Full name: Anthony David Kenworthy
- Date of birth: 30 October 1958 (age 68)
- Place of birth: Leeds, England
- Height: 5 ft 10 in (1.78 m)
- Position: Central defender

Youth career
- Sheffield United

Senior career*
Years	Team	Apps	(Gls)
1976–1986	Sheffield United	465	(39)
1986–1990	Mansfield Town	126	(0)
1993–1994	Ashfield United		
1994–1996	Oakham United		

International career
1977	England under-18	6	(1)

Managerial career
- 1998–1999: Grantham Town
- * Club domestic league appearances and goals

Anthony David Kenworthy (born 30 October 1958) is an English former footballer who played as a central defender in the Football League for Sheffield United and Mansfield Town.

== Football career ==
Kenworthy served his apprenticeship with Sheffield United and made his league debut for the Blades at Norwich City in April 1976. During his early days, he won England youth honours. He played for Sheffield United for ten years, captaining the club and making 465 appearances in all competitions with 39 goals, which is the most by a defender in Sheffield United's history. In 1986, he signed for Mansfield Town, where he made 120 league appearances and scored the winning penalty to defeat Bristol City in the Football League Trophy final at Wembley in 1987.

In 1998, he replaced Danny Bergara for a short spell as manager of Grantham Town.

== Honours ==
Sheffield United

- Football League Fourth Division: 1981–82

Mansfield Town

- Associate Members' Cup: 1986–87
