= 1986–87 Associate Members' Cup =

1986–87 Associate Members Cup
Freight Rover Trophy

Tournament details
- Country: England; Wales

The 1986–87 Associate Members' Cup, known as the 1986–87 Freight Rover Trophy, was the sixth staging of a secondary football league tournament, and the fourth staging of the Associate Members' Cup, a knock-out competition for English football clubs in the Third Division and the Fourth Division. The winners were Mansfield Town and the runners-up were Bristol City.

The competition began on 24 November 1986 and ended with the final on 24 May 1987 at Wembley Stadium.

In the first round, there were two sections split into eight groups: North and South. In the following rounds each section gradually eliminates teams in knock-out fashion until each has a winning finalist. At this point, the two winning finalists faced each other in the combined final for the honour of the trophy.

== Preliminary round ==
=== Northern Section ===
Group 1
Team	Pld	W	D	L	GF	GA	GD	Pts
Chesterfield	2	1	1	0	2	1	+1	4
Middlesbrough	2	1	0	1	4	2	+2	3
Doncaster Rovers	2	0	1	1	0	3	−3	1

Date	Team 1	Score	Team 2
24 Nov	Middlesbrough	3–0	Doncaster Rovers
2 Dec	Chesterfield	2–1	Middlesbrough
9 Dec	Doncaster Rovers	0–0	Chesterfield

Group 2
Team	Pld	W	D	L	GF	GA	GD	Pts
Chester City	2	1	1	0	3	2	+1	4
Preston North End	2	1	1	0	2	1	+1	4
Crewe Alexandra	2	0	0	2	1	3	−2	0

Date	Team 1	Score	Team 2
2 Dec	Crewe Alexandra	1–2	Chester City
16 Dec	Chester City	1–1	Preston North End
5 Jan	Preston North End	1–0	Crewe Alexandra

Group 3
Team	Pld	W	D	L	GF	GA	GD	Pts
Mansfield Town	2	0	2	0	3	3	0	2
Halifax Town	2	0	2	0	2	2	0	2
Rotherham United	2	0	2	0	1	1	0	2

Date	Team 1	Score	Team 2
2 Dec	Mansfield Town	2–2	Halifax Town
5 Dec	Halifax Town	0–0	Rotherham United
9 Dec	Rotherham United	1–1	Mansfield Town

Group 4
Team	Pld	W	D	L	GF	GA	GD	Pts
Lincoln City	2	1	1	0	1	0	+1	4
Scunthorpe United	2	1	0	1	1	1	0	3
Hartlepool United	2	0	1	1	0	1	−1	1

Date	Team 1	Score	Team 2
25 Nov	Lincoln City	1–0	Scunthorpe United
2 Dec	Scunthorpe United	1–0	Hartlepool United
6 Dec	Hartlepool United	0–0	Lincoln City

Group 5
Team	Pld	W	D	L	GF	GA	GD	Pts
Wrexham	2	1	1	0	8	3	+5	4
Wigan Athletic	2	1	1	0	5	4	+1	4
Tranmere Rovers	2	0	0	2	3	9	−6	0

Date	Team 1	Score	Team 2
25 Nov	Wrexham	6–1	Tranmere Rovers
16 Dec	Wigan Athletic	2–2	Wrexham
3 Feb	Tranmere Rovers	2–3	Wigan Athletic

Group 6
Team	Pld	W	D	L	GF	GA	GD	Pts
York City	2	1	1	0	5	2	+3	4
Rochdale	2	0	2	0	3	3	0	2
Darlington	2	0	1	1	3	6	−3	1

Date	Team 1	Score	Team 2
25 Nov	York City	4–1	Darlington
2 Dec	Darlington	2–2	Rochdale
6 Jan	Rochdale	1–1	York City

Group 7
Team	Pld	W	D	L	GF	GA	GD	Pts
Carlisle United	2	2	0	0	4	2	+2	6
Bury	2	1	0	1	5	4	+1	3
Stockport County	2	0	0	2	1	4	−3	0

Date	Team 1	Score	Team 2
6 Dec	Bury	3–1	Stockport County
8 Dec	Stockport County	0–1	Carlisle United
16 Dec	Carlisle United	3–2	Bury

Group 8
Team	Pld	W	D	L	GF	GA	GD	Pts
Bolton Wanderers	2	2	0	0	3	0	+3	6
Burnley	2	1	0	1	3	4	−1	3
Blackpool	2	0	0	2	2	4	−2	0

Date	Team 1	Score	Team 2
2 Dec	Bolton Wanderers	1–0	Blackpool
9 Dec	Blackpool	2–3	Burnley
16 Dec	Burnley	0–2	Bolton Wanderers

=== Southern Section ===
Group 1
Team	Pld	W	D	L	GF	GA	GD	Pts
Aldershot	2	1	1	0	7	5	+2	4
Colchester United	2	1	0	1	4	5	−1	3
Peterborough United	2	0	1	1	4	5	−1	1

Date	Team 1	Score	Team 2
25 Nov	Colchester United	2–1	Peterborough United
3 Dec	Peterborough United	3–3	Aldershot
9 Dec	Aldershot	4–2	Colchester United

Group 2
Team	Pld	W	D	L	GF	GA	GD	Pts
Gillingham	2	2	0	0	6	0	+6	6
Northampton Town	2	1	0	1	3	1	+2	3
Notts County	2	0	0	2	0	8	−8	0

Date	Team 1	Score	Team 2
25 Nov	Notts County	0–5	Gillingham
16 Dec	Gillingham	1–0	Northampton Town
5 Jan	Northampton Town	3–0	Notts County

Group 3
Team	Pld	W	D	L	GF	GA	GD	Pts
Southend United	2	2	0	0	7	5	+2	6
Fulham	2	1	0	1	5	2	+3	3
Cambridge United	2	0	0	2	4	9	−5	0

Date	Team 1	Score	Team 2
2 Dec	Cambridge United	0–4	Fulham
16 Dec	Southend United	5–4	Cambridge United
6 Jan	Fulham	1–2	Southend United

Group 4
Team	Pld	W	D	L	GF	GA	GD	Pts
Wolverhampton Wanderers	2	2	0	0	5	3	+2	6
Bournemouth	2	1	0	1	4	4	0	3
Cardiff City	2	0	0	2	0	2	−2	0

Date	Team 1	Score	Team 2
2 Dec	Cardiff City	0–1	Wolverhampton Wanderers
16 Dec	Wolverhampton Wanderers	4–3	Bournemouth
6 Jan	Bournemouth	1–0	Cardiff City

Group 5
Team	Pld	W	D	L	GF	GA	GD	Pts
Swansea City	2	1	1	0	3	0	+3	4
Walsall	2	1	0	1	1	3	−2	3
Torquay United	2	0	1	1	0	1	−1	1

Date	Team 1	Score	Team 2
2 Dec	Torquay United	0–0	Swansea City
9 Dec	Swansea City	3–0	Walsall
16 Dec	Walsall	1–0	Torquay United

Group 6
Team	Pld	W	D	L	GF	GA	GD	Pts
Bristol City	2	1	1	0	4	1	+3	4
Exeter City	2	0	2	0	2	2	0	2
Bristol Rovers	2	0	1	1	1	4	−3	1

Date	Team 1	Score	Team 2
26 Nov	Exeter City	1–1	Bristol City
16 Dec	Bristol City	3–0	Bristol Rovers
7 Jan	Bristol Rovers	1–1	Exeter City

Group 7
Team	Pld	W	D	L	GF	GA	GD	Pts
Brentford	2	2	0	0	9	3	+6	6
Swindon Town	2	1	0	1	5	4	+1	3
Leyton Orient	2	0	0	2	1	8	−7	0

Date	Team 1	Score	Team 2
9 Dec	Swindon Town	3–0	Leyton Orient
15 Dec	Leyton Orient	1–5	Brentford
6 Jan	Brentford	4–2	Swindon Town

Group 8
Team	Pld	W	D	L	GF	GA	GD	Pts
Hereford United	2	1	0	1	4	1	+3	3
Port Vale	2	1	0	1	2	2	0	3
Newport County	2	1	0	1	2	5	−3	3

Date	Team 1	Score	Team 2
10 Dec	Hereford United	4–0	Newport County
22 Dec	Port Vale	1–0	Hereford United
6 Jan	Newport County	2–1	Port Vale

== First round ==
=== Northern Section ===
Date	Home team	Score	Away team
20 January	Carlisle United	1–2	Preston North End
20 January	Chester City	1–1	Lincoln City
Chester City won on 5-4 penalties
20 January	Halifax Town	1–2	Middlesbrough
27 January	Bolton Wanderers	2–1	Burnley
27 January	Rochdale	3–0	Chesterfield
27 January	Scunthorpe United	1–2	Wrexham
27 January	York City	0–1	Mansfield Town
10 February	Bury	1–1	Wigan Athletic
Bury won on 5-4 penalties

=== Southern Section ===
Date	Home team	Score	Away team
20 January	Exeter City	0–1	Port Vale
26 January	Aldershot	2–0	Swansea City
26 January	Brentford	4–2	Walsall
26 January	Fulham	3–2	Northampton Town
26 January	Gillingham	2–0	Colchester United
26 January	Wolverhampton Wanderers	0–1	Hereford United
27 January	Bristol City	1–0	Southend United
29 January	Swindon Town	2–2	Bournemouth
Swindon Town won 4–2 on penalties

== Quarter-finals ==
=== Northern Section ===
Date	Home team	Score	Away team
10 February	Bolton Wanderers	1–2	Chester City
17 February	Rochdale	0–0	Middlesbrough
Middlesbrough won 4–3 on penalties
17 February	Wrexham	2–1	Preston North End
24 February	Bury	1–2	Mansfield Town

=== Southern Section ===
Date	Home team	Score	Away team
10 February	Aldershot	1–1	Fulham
Aldershot won 11–10 on penalties
10 February	Bristol City	3–0	Brentford
10 February	Port Vale	3–3	Gillingham
Gillingham won 5–4 on penalties
10 February	Swindon Town	4–2	Hereford United

== Area semi-finals ==
=== Northern Section ===
Date	Home team	Score	Away team
10 March	Middlesbrough	0–1	Mansfield Town
23 March	Wrexham	1 – 3	Chester City

=== Southern Section ===
Date	Home team	Score	Away team
10 March	Bristol City	2–0	Gillingham
10 March	Swindon Town	2–3	Aldershot

== Area finals ==
=== Northern Area final ===
8 April 1987

Mansfield Town	2–0	Chester City
	Report

Field Mill, Mansfield
Attendance: 7,679
15 April 1987

Chester City	(1) 1 – 0 (2)	Mansfield Town
	Report

Sealand Road, Chester
Attendance: 8,187

=== Southern Area final ===
8 April 1987

Aldershot	1–2	Bristol City
	Report

Recreation Ground, Aldershot
Attendance: 5,000
14 April 1987

Bristol City	(4) 2 – 0 (1)	Aldershot
	Report

Ashton Gate, Bristol
Attendance: 16,371

== Final ==
24 May 1987

Bristol City	1–1 (a.e.t.)	Mansfield Town
Riley 88'		Kent 57'
Penalties
Williams (penalty scored); Newman (penalty scored); MacPhail (penalty scored); Curle (penalty scored); Owen (penalty missed); Moyes (penalty missed)	4–5	(penalty scored) Kearney; (penalty missed) Cassells; (penalty scored) Stringfellow; (penalty scored) Pollard; (penalty scored) Kent; (penalty scored) Kenworthy

Wembley Stadium, London
Attendance: 58,586
Referee: A.Gunn (Burgess Hill)
