= Tony Evans (footballer, born 1960) =

English footballer

Personal information
- Full name: Anthony William Evans
- Date of birth: 14 March 1960 (age 66)
- Place of birth: Colchester, England
- Position: Midfielder

Senior career*
Years	Team	Apps	(Gls)
1977–1981	Colchester United	29	(2)
- Kongsvinger IL Toppfotball
1984	Wrexham	0	(0)
- Tiptree
- Chelmsford City
- Haverhill
- Wivenhoe Town
- * Club domestic league appearances and goals

Anthony William Evans (born 14 March 1960) is an English footballer who played as a midfielder in the Football League for Colchester United.

== Career ==
He started his career as an apprentice at Colchester United and made his first appearance for the club on 4 March 1978 against Hereford United. His first goal for the club came on 6 October 1978 in a 3–2 win over Swindon Town, with his other goal coming against Southend United. He joined Norwegian side Kingsvinger, in 1980 and had a brief spell at Wrexham as cover for the 1st team, before retiring from the professional game and returned to the Colchester area to work in the construction business with his father. Tony featured in season 5 of The Only Way is Essex, alongside Mick Norcross.
