= 1985–86 Associate Members' Cup =

1985–86 Associate Members Cup
Freight Rover Trophy

Tournament details
- Country: England; Wales

The 1985–86 Associate Members' Cup, known as the 1985–86 Freight Rover Trophy, was the fifth staging of a secondary football league tournament, and the third staging of the Associate Members' Cup, a knock-out competition for English football clubs in the Third Division and the Fourth Division. The winners were Bristol City and the runners-up were Bolton Wanderers.

The competition began on 14 January 1986 and ended with the final on 24 May 1986 at Wembley Stadium.

In the first round, there were two sections split into eight groups: North and South. In the following rounds each section gradually eliminates teams in knock-out fashion until each has a winning finalist. At this point, the two winning finalists faced each other in the combined final for the honour of the trophy.

== Preliminary round ==
=== Northern Section ===
Group 1
| Team | Pld | W | D | L | GF | GA | GD | Pts |
|---|---|---|---|---|---|---|---|---|
| Bolton Wanderers | 2 | 1 | 1 | 0 | 3 | 2 | +1 | 4 |
| Crewe Alexandra | 2 | 1 | 0 | 1 | 4 | 2 | +2 | 3 |
| Stockport County | 2 | 0 | 1 | 1 | 2 | 6 | −4 | 1 |

| Date | Team 1 | Score | Team 2 |
|---|---|---|---|
| 14 Jan | Crewe Alexandra | 4–1 | Stockport County |
| 20 Jan | Stockport County | 2–2 | Bolton Wanderers |
| 28 Jan | Bolton Wanderers | 1–0 | Crewe Alexandra |

Group 2
| Team | Pld | W | D | L | GF | GA | GD | Pts |
|---|---|---|---|---|---|---|---|---|
| Darlington | 2 | 1 | 1 | 0 | 3 | 1 | +2 | 4 |
| Burnley | 2 | 1 | 1 | 0 | 3 | 2 | +1 | 4 |
| Chesterfield | 2 | 0 | 0 | 2 | 1 | 4 | −3 | 0 |

| Date | Team 1 | Score | Team 2 |
|---|---|---|---|
| 14 Jan | Darlington | 2–0 | Chesterfield |
| 21 Jan | Chesterfield | 1–2 | Burnley |
| 13 Mar | Burnley | 1–1 | Darlington |

Group 3
| Team | Pld | W | D | L | GF | GA | GD | Pts |
|---|---|---|---|---|---|---|---|---|
| Scunthorpe United | 2 | 2 | 0 | 0 | 6 | 3 | +3 | 6 |
| Halifax Town | 2 | 0 | 1 | 1 | 3 | 4 | −1 | 1 |
| Lincoln City | 2 | 0 | 1 | 1 | 2 | 4 | −2 | 1 |

| Date | Team 1 | Score | Team 2 |
|---|---|---|---|
| 15 Jan | Lincoln City | 1–3 | Scunthorpe United |
| 21 Jan | Scunthorpe United | 3–2 | Halifax Town |
| 11 Feb | Halifax Town | 1–1 | Lincoln City |

Group 4
| Team | Pld | W | D | L | GF | GA | GD | Pts |
|---|---|---|---|---|---|---|---|---|
| Rotherham United | 2 | 1 | 1 | 0 | 3 | 0 | +3 | 4 |
| Hartlepool United | 2 | 1 | 0 | 1 | 3 | 5 | −2 | 3 |
| York City | 2 | 0 | 1 | 1 | 2 | 3 | −1 | 1 |

| Date | Team 1 | Score | Team 2 |
|---|---|---|---|
| 14 Jan | York City | 0–0 | Rotherham United |
| 21 Jan | Rotherham United | 3–0 | Hartlepool United |
| 28 Jan | Hartlepool United | 3–2 | York City |

Group 5
| Team | Pld | W | D | L | GF | GA | GD | Pts |
|---|---|---|---|---|---|---|---|---|
| Tranmere Rovers | 2 | 2 | 0 | 0 | 4 | 1 | +3 | 6 |
| Preston North End | 2 | 1 | 0 | 1 | 2 | 2 | 0 | 3 |
| Bury | 2 | 0 | 0 | 2 | 1 | 4 | −3 | 0 |

| Date | Team 1 | Score | Team 2 |
|---|---|---|---|
| 20 Jan | Tranmere Rovers | 2–0 | Preston North End |
| 29 Jan | Preston North End | 2–0 | Bury |
| 26 Feb | Bury | 1–2 | Tranmere Rovers |

Group 6
| Team | Pld | W | D | L | GF | GA | GD | Pts |
|---|---|---|---|---|---|---|---|---|
| Wigan Athletic | 2 | 2 | 0 | 0 | 8 | 0 | +8 | 6 |
| Rochdale | 2 | 1 | 0 | 1 | 1 | 6 | −5 | 3 |
| Chester City | 2 | 0 | 0 | 2 | 0 | 3 | −3 | 0 |

| Date | Team 1 | Score | Team 2 |
|---|---|---|---|
| 20 Jan | Rochdale | 1–0 | Chester City |
| 22 Jan | Chester City | 0–2 | Wigan Athletic |
| 28 Jan | Wigan Athletic | 6–0 | Rochdale |

Group 7
| Team | Pld | W | D | L | GF | GA | GD | Pts |
|---|---|---|---|---|---|---|---|---|
| Port Vale | 2 | 1 | 1 | 0 | 4 | 2 | +2 | 4 |
| Wrexham | 2 | 0 | 2 | 0 | 3 | 3 | 0 | 2 |
| Blackpool | 2 | 0 | 1 | 1 | 3 | 5 | −2 | 1 |

| Date | Team 1 | Score | Team 2 |
|---|---|---|---|
| 21 Jan | Wrexham | 1–1 | Port Vale |
| 23 Jan | Blackpool | 2–2 | Wrexham |
| 10 Feb | Port Vale | 3–1 | Blackpool |

Group 8
| Team | Pld | W | D | L | GF | GA | GD | Pts |
|---|---|---|---|---|---|---|---|---|
| Doncaster Rovers | 2 | 1 | 0 | 1 | 1 | 1 | 0 | 3 |
| Mansfield Town | 2 | 1 | 0 | 1 | 1 | 1 | 0 | 3 |
| Notts County | 2 | 1 | 0 | 1 | 1 | 1 | 0 | 3 |

| Date | Team 1 | Score | Team 2 |
|---|---|---|---|
| 16 Jan | Notts County | 1–0 | Doncaster Rovers |
| 21 Jan | Doncaster Rovers | 1–0 | Mansfield Town |
| 11 Mar | Mansfield Town | 1–0 | Notts County |

Group 8 play-off
| Team | Pld | W | D | L | GF | GA | GD | Pts |
|---|---|---|---|---|---|---|---|---|
| Mansfield Town | 2 | 2 | 0 | 0 | 5 | 2 | +3 | 6 |
| Notts County | 1 | 0 | 0 | 1 | 0 | 1 | −1 | 0 |
| Doncaster Rovers | 1 | 0 | 0 | 1 | 2 | 4 | −2 | 0 |

| Date | Team 1 | Score | Team 2 |
|---|---|---|---|
| 17 Mar | Mansfield Town | 4–2 | Doncaster Rovers |
| 20 Mar | Notts County | 0–1 | Mansfield Town |

=== Southern Section ===
Group 1
| Team | Pld | W | D | L | GF | GA | GD | Pts |
|---|---|---|---|---|---|---|---|---|
| Leyton Orient | 2 | 2 | 0 | 0 | 6 | 1 | +5 | 6 |
| Bournemouth | 2 | 1 | 0 | 1 | 6 | 3 | +3 | 3 |
| Reading | 2 | 0 | 0 | 2 | 0 | 8 | −8 | 0 |

| Date | Team 1 | Score | Team 2 |
|---|---|---|---|
| 14 Jan | Leyton Orient | 3–1 | Bournemouth |
| 21 Jan | Bournemouth | 5–1 | Reading |
| 6 Mar | Reading | 0–3 | Leyton Orient |

Group 2
| Team | Pld | W | D | L | GF | GA | GD | Pts |
|---|---|---|---|---|---|---|---|---|
| Northampton Town | 2 | 2 | 0 | 0 | 5 | 2 | +3 | 6 |
| Colchester United | 2 | 1 | 0 | 1 | 5 | 3 | +2 | 3 |
| Southend United | 2 | 0 | 0 | 2 | 2 | 7 | −5 | 0 |

| Date | Team 1 | Score | Team 2 |
|---|---|---|---|
| 14 Jan | Colchester United | 4–1 | Southend United |
| 21 Jan | Northampton Town | 2–1 | Colchester United |
| 13 Mar | Southend United | 1–3 | Northampton Town |

Group 3
| Team | Pld | W | D | L | GF | GA | GD | Pts |
|---|---|---|---|---|---|---|---|---|
| Gillingham | 2 | 1 | 1 | 0 | 3 | 1 | +2 | 4 |
| Brentford | 2 | 0 | 2 | 0 | 1 | 1 | 0 | 2 |
| Derby County | 2 | 0 | 1 | 1 | 0 | 2 | −2 | 1 |

| Date | Team 1 | Score | Team 2 |
|---|---|---|---|
| 15 Jan | Brentford | 0–0 | Derby County |
| 22 Jan | Derby County | 0–2 | Gillingham |
| 29 Jan | Gillingham | 1–1 | Brentford |

Group 4
| Team | Pld | W | D | L | GF | GA | GD | Pts |
|---|---|---|---|---|---|---|---|---|
| Hereford United | 2 | 1 | 1 | 0 | 3 | 1 | +2 | 4 |
| Bristol Rovers | 2 | 1 | 0 | 1 | 2 | 3 | −1 | 3 |
| Swindon Town | 2 | 0 | 1 | 1 | 2 | 3 | −1 | 1 |

| Date | Team 1 | Score | Team 2 |
|---|---|---|---|
| 15 Jan | Hereford United | 2–0 | Bristol Rovers |
| 21 Jan | Bristol Rovers | 2–1 | Swindon Town |
| 11 Mar | Swindon Town | 1–1 | Hereford United |

Group 5
| Team | Pld | W | D | L | GF | GA | GD | Pts |
|---|---|---|---|---|---|---|---|---|
| Cambridge United | 2 | 2 | 0 | 0 | 5 | 1 | +4 | 6 |
| Peterborough United | 2 | 1 | 0 | 1 | 3 | 4 | −1 | 3 |
| Aldershot | 2 | 0 | 0 | 2 | 0 | 3 | −3 | 0 |

| Date | Team 1 | Score | Team 2 |
|---|---|---|---|
| 14 Jan | Aldershot | 0–1 | Cambridge United |
| 17 Jan | Cambridge United | 4–1 | Peterborough United |
| 17 Apr | Peterborough United | 2–0 | Aldershot |

Group 6
| Team | Pld | W | D | L | GF | GA | GD | Pts |
|---|---|---|---|---|---|---|---|---|
| Bristol City | 2 | 1 | 1 | 0 | 2 | 1 | +1 | 4 |
| Walsall | 2 | 1 | 0 | 1 | 2 | 2 | 0 | 3 |
| Plymouth Argyle | 2 | 0 | 1 | 1 | 0 | 1 | −1 | 1 |

| Date | Team 1 | Score | Team 2 |
|---|---|---|---|
| 14 Jan | Bristol City | 0–0 | Plymouth Argyle |
| 21 Jan | Plymouth Argyle | 0–1 | Walsall |
| 28 Jan | Walsall | 1–2 | Bristol City |

Group 7
| Team | Pld | W | D | L | GF | GA | GD | Pts |
|---|---|---|---|---|---|---|---|---|
| Swansea City | 2 | 1 | 1 | 0 | 3 | 1 | +2 | 4 |
| Newport County | 2 | 1 | 1 | 0 | 2 | 1 | +1 | 4 |
| Cardiff City | 2 | 0 | 0 | 2 | 0 | 3 | −3 | 0 |

| Date | Team 1 | Score | Team 2 |
|---|---|---|---|
| 20 Jan | Swansea City | 1–1 | Newport County |
| 21 Jan | Newport County | 1–0 | Cardiff City |
| 28 Jan | Cardiff City | 0–2 | Swansea City |

Group 8
| Team | Pld | W | D | L | GF | GA | GD | Pts |
|---|---|---|---|---|---|---|---|---|
| Torquay United | 2 | 1 | 1 | 0 | 2 | 1 | +1 | 4 |
| Wolverhampton Wanderers | 2 | 0 | 2 | 0 | 2 | 2 | 0 | 2 |
| Exeter City | 2 | 0 | 1 | 1 | 1 | 2 | −1 | 1 |

| Date | Team 1 | Score | Team 2 |
|---|---|---|---|
| 14 Jan | Exeter City | 1–1 | Wolverhampton Wanderers |
| 22 Jan | Wolverhampton Wanderers | 1–1 | Torquay United |
| 29 Jan | Torquay United | 1–0 | Exeter City |

== Quarter-finals ==
=== Northern Section ===
| Date | Home team | Score | Away team |
|---|---|---|---|
| 18 February | Wigan Athletic | 3–0 | Rotherham United |
| 10 March | Scunthorpe United | 1–1 | Port Vale |
Port Vale won 4–3 on penalties
| 11 March | Bolton Wanderers | 2–1 | Tranmere Rovers |
| 27 March | Darlington | 3–0 | Mansfield Town |

=== Southern Section ===
| Date | Home team | Score | Away team |
|---|---|---|---|
| 19 February | Swansea City | 1–0 | Torquay United |
| 24 February | Gillingham | 2–0 | Cambridge United |
| 24 March | Leyton Orient | 1–2 | Hereford United |
| 27 March | Bristol City | 3–2 | Northampton Town |

== Area semi-finals ==
=== Northern Section ===
| Date | Home team | Score | Away team |
|---|---|---|---|
| 26 March | Port Vale | 1–2 | Wigan Athletic |
| 1 May | Darlington | 0–3 | Bolton Wanderers |

=== Southern Section ===
| Date | Home team | Score | Away team |
|---|---|---|---|
| 2 April | Bristol City | 3–0 | Gillingham |
| 2 April | Hereford United | 0–0 | Swansea City |
Hereford United won 5–4 on penalties

== Area finals ==
=== Northern Area final ===
6 May 1986

| Wigan Athletic | 0–1 | Bolton Wanderers |
|---|---|---|
| | Report |

Springfield Park, Wigan
Attendance: 6,976
9 May 1986

| Bolton Wanderers | (3) 2 – 1 (1) | Wigan Athletic |
|---|---|---|
| | Report |

Burnden Park, Bolton
Attendance: 12,120

=== Southern Area final ===
6 May 1986

| Hereford United | 2–0 | Bristol City |

Edgar Street, Hereford
Attendance: 7,608
9 May 1986

| Bristol City | (3) 3 – 0 (2) | Hereford United |
|---|---|---|
| | Report |

Ashton Gate, Bristol
Attendance: 11,558

== Final ==
24 May 1986

| Bristol City | 3–0 | Bolton Wanderers |
|---|---|---|
| Riley, Pritchard | Report |

Wembley Stadium, London
Attendance: 54,502
Referee: G.Tyson (Sunderland)

== Notes ==
General

- statto.com

Specific
