= 1973–74 Colchester United F.C. season =

Colchester United
1973–74 season
- Chairman: Robert Jackson
- Manager: Jim Smith
- Stadium: Layer Road
- Fourth Division: 3rd (promoted)
- FA Cup: 1st round (eliminated by Peterborough United)
- League Cup: 1st round (eliminated by Gillingham)
- Top goalscorer: League: Bobby Svarc (25); All: Bobby Svarc (26)
- Highest home attendance: 10,007 v Gillingham, 20 April 1974
- Lowest home attendance: 3,460 v Bradford City, 1 December 1973
- Average home league attendance: 5,601
- Biggest win: 4–0 v Torquay United, 19 September 1973 v Chester, 14 November 1973 v Bradford City, 1 December 1973
- Biggest defeat: 1–4 v Gillingham, 8 December 1973
Home colours

The 1973–74 season was Colchester United's 32nd season in their history and their sixth successive season in the fourth tier of English football, the Fourth Division. Alongside competing in the Fourth Division, the club also participated in the FA Cup and the League Cup.

Jim Smith led his side to promotion to the Third Division in his first full season in charge, finishing in third position, five points behind winners Peterborough United. Colchester experienced first round cup exits in both competitions, coincidentally losing to both teams which finished above them in the league; a defeat to Peterborough in the FA Cup and a defeat at Gillingham in the League Cup.

== Season overview ==
Manager Jim Smith brought in Watford pair Mike Walker and Mick Packer during the summer break and also spent £8,000 on forward Paul Aimson from Bournemouth. While Aimson suffered a career-ending injury early in the season, Bobby Svarc found form and registered 25 league goals, including a record-equalling four goals at Chester in November.

At Christmas, Colchester led the Fourth Division table. Bobby Svarc's goalscoring waned, and Smith brought in Gary Moore on loan from Southend United. He scored seven goals in the U's eleven remaining games as Colchester sealed a promotion place. They finished in third position, five points behind Peterborough United and two adrift of Gillingham. The final home game of the season drew a crowd of 10,007, a game in which Gillingham won 2–0 and crept above Colchester in the league table. This would be the last time that Layer Road hosted a five-figure attendance in league competition.

In the cup competitions, Colchester were knocked out in the first round of both the FA Cup and League Cup, coincidentally against their two biggest league title rivals, Peterborough and Gillingham. Gillingham beat United 4–2 at Priestfield in the League Cup in August, while Peterborough triumphed 3–2 at Layer Road in the FA Cup first round.

== Players ==
As of match played 27 April 1974.

Name	Position	Nationality	Place of birth	Date of birth	Apps	Goals	Signed from	Date signed	Fee
Goalkeepers
Mike Walker	GK	(Wales)	Colwyn Bay	28 November 1945 (aged 27)	0	0	(England) Watford	July 1973	£4,000
Defenders
Micky Cook	FB	(England)	Enfield	9 April 1951 (aged 22)	146	1	(England) Orient	1 March 1969	Free transfer
Barry Dominey	CB	(England)	Edmonton	21 October 1955 (aged 17)	0	0	(England) Enfield WMC	September 1973	Free transfer
Ray Harford	CB	(England)	Halifax	1 June 1945 (aged 28)	21	1	(England) Port Vale	3 February 1973 (Note: Date of signing refers to the date of the player's first game for the club)	£1,750
Stuart Morgan	CB	(Wales)	Swansea	23 September 1949 (aged 23)	36	2	(England) Reading	August 1972	Free transfer
Mick Packer	FB	(England)	Willesden	20 April 1950 (aged 23)	0	0	(England) Watford	July 1973	Free transfer
Alex Smith	FB	(England)	Thornhill	11 May 1947 (aged 26)	0	0	(England) Southend United	27 January 1974	£5,000
Lindsay Smith	CB	(England)	Enfield	18 September 1954 (aged 18)	54	4	Apprentice	20 April 1971	Free transfer
Midfielders
Ray Bunkell	MF	(England)	Edmonton	18 September 1949 (aged 23)	0	0	(England) Swindon Town	December 1973	Part exchange
Steve Foley	MF	(England)	Clacton-on-Sea	21 June 1953 (aged 19)	57	13	Apprentice	July 1969	Free transfer
Steve Leslie	MF	(England)	Hornsey	4 September 1952 (aged 20)	80	16	Apprentice	20 April 1971	Free transfer
Bobby Mills	MF	(England)	Edmonton	16 March 1955 (aged 18)	8	0	Apprentice	4 March 1972	Free transfer
Bobby Roberts	MF	(Scotland)	Edinburgh	2 September 1940 (aged 32)	2	0	(England) Coventry City	1 March 1973	Free transfer
Phil Thomas	MF	(England)	Sherborne	14 December 1952 (aged 20)	35	2	(England) Bournemouth	Summer 1972	Free transfer
Tony Wingate	MF	(England)	Islington	21 March 1955 (aged 18)	1	0	Apprentice	18 March 1972	Free transfer
Forwards
Barry Dyson	FW	(England)	Oldham	6 September 1942 (aged 30)	0	0	(England) Orient	25 August 1973	Free transfer
Colwyn Rowe	WG	(England)	Ipswich	22 March 1956 (aged 17)	0	0	Apprentice	October 1973	Free transfer
Bobby Svarc	FW	(England)	Leicester	8 February 1946 (aged 27)	20	8	(England) Boston United	December 1972	£6,000

== Transfers ==
=== In ===
Date	Position	Nationality	Name	From	Fee	Ref.
Summer 1973	RB	(England)	Will Dixon	(England) Reading	Free transfer	
July 1973	GK	(Wales)	Mike Walker	(England) Watford	£4,000	
July 1973	FB	(England)	Mick Packer	(England) Watford	Free transfer	
1 August 1973	FW	(England)	Paul Aimson	(England) Bournemouth	£8,000	
25 August 1973	FW	(England)	Barry Dyson	(England) Bournemouth	Free transfer	(Note: Date of signing refers to the date of the player's first game for the club)
September 1973	CB	(England)	Barry Dominey	(England) Enfield WMC	Free transfer	
September 1973	CB	(England)	Barry Dominey	(England) Enfield WMC	Free transfer	
October 1973	WG	(England)	Colwyn Rowe	Apprentice	Free transfer	
December 1973	MF	(England)	Ray Bunkell	(England) Southend United	Part-exchange (£5,000)	
27 January 1974	FB	(England)	Alex Smith	(England) Southend United	£5,000	

- Total spending: ▼ ~ £22,000

=== Out ===
Date	Position	Nationality	Name	To	Fee	Ref.
30 April 1973	GK	(Scotland)	John McInally	(England) Braintree & Crittall Athletic	Player-manager	(Note: Date of departure refers to the date of the player's final game for the club)
30 April 1973	CB	(England)	Richard Bourne	(England) Ramsgate	Released	
30 April 1973	MF	(England)	Stan Brown	(England) Wimbledon	Released	
August 1973	MF	(England)	Phil Bloss	(England) Wimbledon	Released	
September 1973	RB	(England)	Will Dixon	(England) Swindon Town	Free transfer	
December 1973	FB	(England)	John McLaughlin	(England) Swindon Town	Part-exchange (£25,000)	
December 1973	WG	(England)	Mick Mahon	(England) Wimbledon	£3,000	
22 February 1974	FW	(England)	Paul Aimson	Free agent	Retired	

- Total incoming: ▲ ~ £28,000

=== Loans in ===
Date	Position	Nationality	Name	From	End date	Ref.
October 1973	FW	(England)	Peter Silvester	(England) Norwich City	2 November 1983	(Note: Loan start and end dates refer to the date of the player's first and final games for the club)
November 1973	FB	(England)	Alex Smith	(England) Southend United	5 January 1974	
1 February 1974	WG	(England)	Terry Anderson	(England) Norwich City	2 March 1974	
March 1974	MF	(England)	Paul Taylor	(England) York City	12 May 1974	
March 1974	FW	(England)	Gary Moore	(England) Southend United	4 May 1974	

== Match details ==
=== Fourth Division ===
==== Results round by round ====
Round	1	2	3	4	5	6	7	8	9	10	11	12	13	14	15	16	17	18	19	20	21	22	23	24	25	26	27	28	29	30	31	32	33	34	35	36	37	38	39	40	41	42	43	44	45	46
Ground	A	H	A	H	H	A	A	H	H	A	H	H	A	A	H	A	A	H	H	A	A	A	H	H	A	H	A	H	A	A	H	A	H	A	H	A	H	H	A	A	H	H	H	A	H	A
Result	W	W	D	D	W	W	L	W	D	D	W	W	D	D	W	D	W	W	W	L	W	L	D	W	W	W	W	W	L	L	W	L	W	L	L	L	D	W	W	W	W	D	W	D	L	D
Position	5	1	1	3	3	2	4	1	2	4	1	1	2	3	1	2	1	1	1	2	1	2	2	1	1	1	1	1	1	1	1	1	1	1	2	1	2	1	1	1	1	1	1	1	2	3

Source: 11v11.com
A = Away; H = Home; W = Win; D = Draw; L = Loss

==== League table ====
Pos	Team	Pld	W	D	L	GF	GA	GAv	Pts	Promotion or relegation
1	Peterborough United	46	27	11	8	75	38	1.974	65	Division Champions, promoted
2	Gillingham	46	25	12	9	90	49	1.837	62	Promoted
3	Colchester United	46	24	12	10	73	36	2.028	60	Promoted
4	Bury	46	24	11	11	81	49	1.653	59	Promoted
5	Northampton Town	46	20	13	13	63	48	1.313	53	

Source: rsssf.com

==== Matches ====
25 August 1973 1	Barnsley	0–1	Colchester United	Barnsley
		Report	Svarc 1'	Stadium: Oakwell; Attendance: 2,500; Referee: M Smith

1 September 1973 2	Colchester United	3–2	Crewe Alexandra	Colchester
	Aimson 46'; Svarc 48'; Morgan 76'	Report	Lugg 52'; Purdie 80'	Stadium: Layer Road; Attendance: 4,078; Referee: M Veith

7 September 1973 3	Northampton Town	0–0	Colchester United	Northampton
		Report		Stadium: County Ground; Attendance: 4,916; Referee: R Marshall

11 September 1973 4	Colchester United	0–0	Reading	Colchester
		Report		Stadium: Layer Road; Attendance: 4,565; Referee: R Robinson

15 September 1973 5	Colchester United	4–1	Newport County	Colchester
	Thomas 6'; Svarc 11'; Leslie 24'; Morgan 57'	Report	Hill 33'	Stadium: Layer Road; Attendance: 3,523; Referee: D Civil

19 September 1973 6	Torquay United	0–4	Colchester United	Torquay
	Stuckey (red card)	Report	Thomas 35'; Svarc 40'; Dyson 44'; Leslie 80'	Stadium: Plainmoor; Attendance: 3,428; Referee: A Glasgow

22 September 1973 7	Swansea City	2–0	Colchester United	Swansea
	Screen 37'; Thomas 67'	Report		Stadium: Vetch Field; Attendance: 1,981; Referee: R Brandon

28 September 1973 8	Colchester United	1–0	Exeter City	Colchester
	Leslie 83'	Report		Stadium: Layer Road; Attendance: 5,466; Referee: John Homewood

2 October 1973 9	Colchester United	2–2	Torquay United	Colchester
	Svarc 37', 50'	Report	Myers 9'; Morrall 31'	Stadium: Layer Road; Attendance: 5,291; Referee: T Page

6 October 1973 10	Hartlepool	0–0	Colchester United	Hartlepool
		Report; Report		Stadium: Victoria Park; Attendance: 1,910; Referee: R Clay

12 October 1973 11	Colchester United	3–0	Darlington	Colchester
	Foley 34', 55'; Svarc 78'	Report		Stadium: Layer Road; Attendance: 5,089; Referee: Tommy Dawes

19 October 1973 12	Colchester United	2–0	Scunthorpe United	Colchester
	Morgan 19'; Svarc 42'	Report		Stadium: Layer Road; Attendance: 4,862; Referee: K Salmon

24 October 1973 13	Reading	1–1	Colchester United	Reading
	Chappell 3'	Report	Svarc 70'	Stadium: Elm Park; Attendance: 12,310; Referee: K Baker

27 October 1973 14	Rotherham United	0–0	Colchester United	Rotherham
		Report		Stadium: Millmoor; Attendance: 4,594; Referee: R Walmsley

2 November 1973 15	Colchester United	3–0	Workington	Colchester
19:15 GMT	Morgan 33'; Cook 57'; Harford 77'	Report		Stadium: Layer Road; Attendance: 5,342; Referee: A Hamil

10 November 1973 16	Mansfield Town	2–2	Colchester United	Mansfield
	Longhorn 8'; Eccles 9'	Report	Foley 61', 72'	Stadium: Field Mill; Attendance: 3,033; Referee: J Butcher

14 November 1973 17	Chester	0–4	Colchester United	Chester
		Report	Svarc 25', 34', 62', 71'	Stadium: Sealand Road; Attendance: 1,973; Referee: D Richardson

17 November 1973 18	Colchester United	3–1	Stockport County	Colchester
14:15 GMT	Dyson 49' (pen.), 51' (pen.); Foley 71'	Report	Kirk 67'	Stadium: Layer Road; Attendance: 4,966; Referee: T Bone

1 December 1973 19	Colchester United	4–0	Bradford City	Colchester
	Svarc 26', 80'; Morgan 45'; Dyson 60'	Report		Stadium: Layer Road; Attendance: 3,460; Referee: K Dodd

8 December 1973 20	Gillingham	4–1	Colchester United	Gillingham
	Richardson 6'; Wilks 9', 60'; Jacks 70'	Report	L Smith 30'	Stadium: Priestfield Stadium; Attendance: 8,411; Referee: C Newsome

15 December 1973 21	Stockport County	0–3	Colchester United	Stockport
		Report	Svarc 15'; Foley 35', 80'	Stadium: Edgeley Park; Attendance: 1,472; Referee: Gordon Hill

22 December 1973 22	Exeter City	1–0	Colchester United	Exeter
	Binney 55'	Report		Stadium: St James Park; Attendance: 3,638; Referee: H Powell

26 December 1973 23	Colchester United	1–1	Peterborough United	Colchester
	Svarc 90'	Report	Hall 80'	Stadium: Layer Road; Attendance: 7,960; Referee: M Taylor

29 December 1973 24	Colchester United	1–0	Northampton Town	Colchester
	Dyson 77' (pen.)	Report		Stadium: Layer Road; Attendance: 5,042; Referee: B Martin

1 January 1974 25	Crewe Alexandra	1–2	Colchester United	Crewe
	Riley 89'	Report	Svarc 12'; Foley 44'	Stadium: Gresty Road; Attendance: 2,383; Referee: E Garner

5 January 1974 26	Colchester United	4–1	Lincoln City	Colchester
	Svarc 9', 43'; Morgan 20'; Leslie 49'	Report	McNeil 54'	Stadium: Layer Road; Attendance: 4,398; Referee: L Shapter

12 January 1974 27	Newport County	1–3	Colchester United	Newport
	Hooper 50'	Report	Cook 48'; Leslie 56'; Thomas 90'	Stadium: Somerton Park; Attendance: 3,304; Referee: P Richardson

19 January 1974 28	Colchester United	2–0	Barnsley	Colchester
	Svarc 9'; Dyson 82' (pen.)	Report		Stadium: Layer Road; Attendance: 5,793; Referee: C White

27 January 1974 29	Doncaster Rovers	2–0	Colchester United	Doncaster
	Ternent 58'; Kitchen 63'	Report		Stadium: Belle Vue; Attendance: 4,285; Referee: A Morrisey

3 February 1974 30	Bury	2–0	Colchester United	Bury
	Spence 74'; Rudd 86'	Report		Stadium: Gigg Lane; Attendance: 7,796; Referee: M Williams

8 February 1974 31	Colchester United	2–0	Swansea City	Colchester
	Morgan 4'; Svarc 71'	Report	Screen (red card)	Stadium: Layer Road; Attendance: 5,040; Referee: Alf Grey

16 February 1974 32	Darlington	1–0	Colchester United	Darlington
	Atkins 50'	Report		Stadium: Feethams; Attendance: 2,275; Referee: I Smith

22 February 1974 33	Colchester United	3–0	Hartlepool	Colchester
	A Smith 59'; Svarc 71'; Aimson 82'	Report		Stadium: Layer Road; Attendance: 5,608; Referee: Ron Challis

2 March 1974 34	Peterborough United	2–0	Colchester United	Peterborough
	Hall 12'; Cozens 83'	Report		Stadium: London Road Stadium; Attendance: 10,714; Referee: R Capey

8 March 1974 35	Colchester United	0–1	Rotherham United	Colchester
		Report	Goodfellow 19'	Stadium: Layer Road; Attendance: 5,180; Referee: A Hart

16 March 1974 36	Scunthorpe United	1–0	Colchester United	Scunthorpe
	Keeley 90'	Report		Stadium: Old Showground; Attendance: 2,134; Referee: J Hough

19 March 1974 37	Colchester United	1–1	Bury	Colchester
	Moore 34'	Report	Melledew 72'	Stadium: Layer Road; Attendance: 4,748; Referee: D Nippard

22 March 1974 38	Colchester United	1–0	Mansfield Town	Colchester
	Morgan 33'	Report		Stadium: Layer Road; Attendance: 4,695; Referee: Malcolm Sinclair

27 March 1974 39	Lincoln City	0–1	Colchester United	Lincoln
		Report	Svarc 50'	Stadium: Sincil Bank; Attendance: 2,638; Referee: E Wallace

30 March 1974 40	Workington	1–4	Colchester United	Workington
	Heslop 82'	Report	Thomas 5'; Moore 45'; Svarc 46'; Wood 88' (o.g.)	Stadium: Borough Park; Attendance: 1,103; Referee: A Porter

2 April 1974 41	Colchester United	3–0	Doncaster Rovers	Colchester
	Cook 47', 78'; Moore 74'	Report		Stadium: Layer Road; Attendance: 5,124; Referee: P Reeves

5 April 1974 42	Colchester United	1–1	Chester	Colchester
	Moore 89' (pen.)	Report	Owen 23'	Stadium: Layer Road; Attendance: 6,371; Referee: T Spencer

12 April 1974 43	Colchester United	2–1	Brentford	Colchester
	Moore 31', 76'	Report	Simmons 61'	Stadium: Layer Road; Attendance: 8,155; Referee: A Lees

16 April 1974 44	Brentford	0–0	Colchester United	Brentford
		Report		Stadium: Griffin Park; Attendance: 7,480; Referee: I Jones

20 April 1974 45	Colchester United	0–2	Gillingham	Colchester
15:00 BST		Report	Yeo 40', 52'	Stadium: Layer Road; Attendance: 10,007; Referee: R Crabb

27 April 1974 46	Bradford City	1–1	Colchester United	Bradford
	Fretwell 34' (pen.)	Report	Moore 28'	Stadium: Valley Parade; Attendance: 3,702; Referee: G Flint

=== League Cup ===
29 August 1973 1st round	Gillingham	4–2	Colchester United	Gillingham
	Peach 40'; Wilks 69'; Quirke 76'; Yeo 88'	Report	Cook 16'; Svarc 42'	Stadium: Priestfield Stadium; Attendance: 3,991; Referee: Gordon Kew

=== FA Cup ===
24 November 1973 1st round	Colchester United	2–3	Peterborough United	Colchester
	Mahon 22'; Harford 90'	Report	Cozens 71', 77'; Murray 73'	Stadium: Layer Road; Attendance: 9,664; Referee: P Reeves

== Squad statistics ==
=== Appearances and goals ===
No.	Pos	Nat	Player	Total		Fourth Division		FA Cup		League Cup	
No.	Pos	Nat	Player	Apps	Goals	Apps	Goals	Apps	Goals	Apps	Goals
	GK	(Wales) WAL	Mike Walker	48	0	46	0	1	0	1	0
	DF	(England) ENG	Micky Cook	46	5	44	4	1	0	1	1
	DF	(England) ENG	Barry Dominey	3	0	1+2	0	0	0	0	0
	DF	(England) ENG	Ray Harford	48	2	46	1	1	1	1	0
	DF	(Wales) WAL	Stuart Morgan	40	8	38	8	1	0	1	0
	DF	(England) ENG	Mick Packer	35	0	32+1	0	1	0	1	0
	DF	(England) ENG	Alex Smith	29	1	29	1	0	0	0	0
	DF	(England) ENG	Lindsay Smith	35	1	23+11	1	0+1	0	0	0
	MF	(England) ENG	Ray Bunkell	6	0	5+1	0	0	0	0	0
	MF	(England) ENG	Steve Foley	34	8	32	8	1	0	1	0
	MF	(England) ENG	Steve Leslie	24	0	21+3	0	0	0	0	0
	MF	(England) ENG	Bobby Mills	23	0	14+4	0	5	0	0	0
	MF	(England) ENG	Phil Thomas	42	4	38+2	4	1	0	1	0
	FW	(England) ENG	Barry Dyson	38	6	36	6	1	0	1	0
	FW	(England) ENG	Colwyn Rowe	1	0	0+1	0	0	0	0	0
	FW	(England) ENG	Bobby Svarc	48	26	46	25	1	0	1	1
Players who appeared for Colchester who left during the season
	DF	(England) ENG	John McLaughlin	20	0	18	0	1	0	1	0
	MF	(England) ENG	Paul Taylor	9	0	6+3	0	0	0	0	0
	FW	(England) ENG	Paul Aimson	5	2	3+1	2	0	0	1	0
	FW	(England) ENG	Terry Anderson	4	0	4	0	0	0	0	0
	FW	(England) ENG	Mick Mahon	14	1	9+3	0	1	1	1	0
	FW	(England) ENG	Gary Moore	11	7	11	7	0	0	0	0
	FW	(England) ENG	Peter Silvester	4	0	4	0	0	0	0	0

=== Goalscorers ===
Place	Nationality	Position	Name	Fourth Division	FA Cup	League Cup	Total
1	(England)	FW	Bobby Svarc	25	0	1	26
2	(England)	MF	Steve Foley	8	0	0	8
2	(Wales)	CB	Stuart Morgan	8	0	0	8
4	(England)	FW	Gary Moore	7	0	0	7
5	(England)	FW	Barry Dyson	6	0	0	6
6	(England)	FB	Micky Cook	4	0	1	5
6	(England)	MF	Steve Leslie	5	0	0	5
8	(England)	MF	Phil Thomas	4	0	0	4
9	(England)	FW	Paul Aimson	2	0	0	2
9	(England)	CB	Ray Harford	1	1	0	2
11	(England)	WG	Mick Mahon	0	1	0	1
11	(England)	FB	Alex Smith	1	0	0	1
11	(England)	CB	Lindsay Smith	1	0	0	1
			Own goals	1	0	0	1
			TOTALS	73	2	2	77

=== Disciplinary record ===
Nationality	Position	Name	Fourth Division		FA Cup		League Cup		Total	
Nationality	Position	Name	Booked	Sent off (straight red)	Booked	Sent off (straight red)	Booked	Sent off (straight red)	Booked	Sent off (straight red)
(Wales)	CB	Stuart Morgan	0	1	0	0	0	0	0	1
(England)	FB	Micky Cook	1	0	0	0	0	0	1	0
(England)	CB	Ray Harford	1	0	0	0	0	0	1	0
(England)	FB	Micky Cook	1	0	0	0	0	0	1	0
(England)	MF	Bobby Mills	1	0	0	0	0	0	1	0
(England)	FB	Mick Packer	1	0	0	0	0	0	1	0
(England)	FB	Alex Smith	1	0	0	0	0	0	1	0
(England)	CB	Lindsay Smith	1	0	0	0	0	0	1	0
		TOTALS	7	1	0	0	0	0	7	1

=== Clean sheets ===
Number of games goalkeepers kept a clean sheet.

Place	Nationality	Player	Fourth Division	FA Cup	League Cup	Total
1	(Wales)	Mike Walker	21	0	0	21
		TOTALS	21	0	0	21

=== Player debuts ===
Players making their first-team Colchester United debut in a fully competitive match.

Position	Nationality	Player	Date	Opponent	Ground	Notes
GK	(Wales)	Mike Walker	25 August 1973	Barnsley	Oakwell	
FB	(England)	Mick Packer	25 August 1973	Barnsley	Oakwell	
FW	(England)	Paul Aimson	25 August 1973	Barnsley	Oakwell	
FW	(England)	Barry Dyson	25 August 1973	Barnsley	Oakwell	
FW	(England)	Peter Silvester	6 October 1973	Hartlepool	Victoria Park	
FB	(England)	Alex Smith	10 November 1973	Mansfield Town	Field Mill	
MF	(England)	Ray Bunkell	8 December 1973	Gillingham	Priestfield Stadium	
FB	(England)	Alex Smith	27 January 1974	Doncaster Rovers	Belle Vue	(Note: Second debut for the club)
WG	(England)	Colwyn Rowe	3 February 1974	Bury	Gigg Lane	
WG	(England)	Terry Anderson	8 February 1974	Swansea City	Layer Road	
CB	(England)	Barry Dominey	16 March 1974	Scunthorpe United	Old Showground	
MF	(England)	Paul Taylor	16 March 1974	Scunthorpe United	Old Showground	
FW	(England)	Gary Moore	16 March 1974	Scunthorpe United	Old Showground	

== See also ==
- List of Colchester United F.C. seasons
