= 1974–75 Colchester United F.C. season =

Colchester United
1974–75 season
- Chairman: Robert Jackson (until November); Jack Rippingale (from November)
- Manager: Jim Smith
- Stadium: Layer Road
- Third Division: 11th
- FA Cup: 2nd round (eliminated by Leatherhead)
- League Cup: 5th round (eliminated by Aston Villa)
- Top goalscorer: League: Bobby Svarc (24); All: Bobby Svarc (25)
- Highest home attendance: 11,812 v Aston Villa, 3 December 1974
- Lowest home attendance: 3,202 v Bury, 2 May 1975
- Average home league attendance: 5,460
- Biggest win: 5–0 v Grimsby Town, 15 November 1974
- Biggest defeat: 1–4 v Swindon Town, 30 November 1974 v Charlton Athletic, 1 January 1975; 2–5; Walsall, 15 March 1975
Home colours

The 1974–75 season was Colchester United's 33rd season in their history and their first season back in the third tier of English football for six years, the Third Division. Alongside competing in the Third Division, the club also participated in the FA Cup and the League Cup.

Jim Smith consolidated Colchester's position back in the third tier by leading them to an eleventh position finish to the season. They experienced a successful cup run in the League Cup, eventually falling to Second Division Aston Villa in the quarter-final stage. However, they were knocked out of the FA Cup in the second round by non-League outfit Leatherhead.

== Season overview ==
Ahead of the new season, Colchester's board warned that a break-even gate of 9,200 was required and that players would be sold if attendances didn't reach an average of 7,500. However, manager Jim Smith returned to former club Boston United to sign Bobby Svarc's old strike partner John Froggatt for £6,000. The acquisition was fruitful, with Svarc finding the back of the net 24 times in the league and 25 times in total, with Froggatt registering 18 with 16 in the league.

Having reached the quarter-final of the FA Cup four seasons prior, the U's emulated that achievement in the League Cup. After beating Oxford United and Southend United, they hosted First Division Carlisle United, beating the Cumbrians 2–0 to earn a home tie with Southampton. A 0–0 draw at Layer Road led to a 1–0 replay win at The Dell, courtesy of a Barry Dominey goal. This set up a quarter-final tie with Second Division Aston Villa. Villa were just too strong for United, winning 2–1 before a Layer Road crowd of 11,812.

Colchester's success in the League Cup was not replicated in the FA Cup as they were knocked out by non-League outfit Leatherhead in the second round. In the league, a strong start to the season was followed up by a weaker second half to the campaign as the U's fell from fifth to eleventh where they ended the season.

Crowds fell a long way short of the target expected by the board, with a league average of 4,941 attending during the season.

== Players ==
As of match played 2 May 1975.

Name	Position	Nationality	Place of birth	Date of birth	Apps	Goals	Signed from	Date signed	Fee
Goalkeepers
Mike Walker	GK	(Wales)	Colwyn Bay	28 November 1945 (aged 28)	48	0	(England) Watford	July 1973	£4,000
Defenders
Stewart Bright	FB	(England)	Colchester	13 October 1957 (aged 16)	0	0	Apprentice	Summer 1974	Free transfer
Micky Cook	FB	(England)	Enfield	9 April 1951 (aged 23)	192	6	(England) Orient	1 March 1969	Free transfer
Barry Dominey	CB	(England)	Edmonton	21 October 1955 (aged 18)	3	0	(England) Enfield WMC	September 1973	Free transfer
Ray Harford	CB	(England)	Halifax	1 June 1945 (aged 29)	69	3	(England) Port Vale	3 February 1973 (Note: Date of signing refers to the date of the player's first game for the club)	£1,750
Mick Packer	FB	(England)	Willesden	20 April 1950 (aged 24)	35	0	(England) Watford	July 1973	Free transfer
Lindsay Smith	CB	(England)	Enfield	18 September 1954 (aged 19)	89	5	Apprentice	20 April 1971	Free transfer
Midfielders
Ray Bunkell	MF	(England)	Edmonton	18 September 1949 (aged 24)	6	0	(England) Swindon Town	December 1973	Part exchange
Steve Foley	MF	(England)	Clacton-on-Sea	21 June 1953 (aged 20)	91	21	Apprentice	July 1969	Free transfer
Steve Leslie	MF	(England)	Hornsey	4 September 1952 (aged 21)	104	21	Apprentice	20 April 1971	Free transfer
Jimmy Lindsay	MF	(Scotland)	Hamilton	12 July 1949 (aged 24)	0	0	(England) Watford	17 August 1974	Free transfer
Bobby Roberts	MF	(Scotland)	Edinburgh	2 September 1940 (aged 33)	2	0	(England) Coventry City	1 March 1973	Free transfer
Phil Thomas	MF	(England)	Sherborne	14 December 1952 (aged 21)	77	6	(England) Bournemouth	Summer 1972	Free transfer
Forwards
Ian Allinson	WG	(England)	Hitchin	1 October 1957 (aged 16)	0	0	Apprentice	Summer 1974	Free transfer
John Froggatt	FW	(England)	Stanton Hill	13 December 1945 (aged 28)	0	0	(England) Boston United	Summer 1974	£6,000
Bobby Svarc	FW	(England)	Leicester	8 February 1946 (aged 28)	68	34	(England) Boston United	December 1972	£6,000

== Transfers ==
=== In ===
Date	Position	Nationality	Name	From	Fee	Ref.
Summer 1974	FB	(England)	Stewart Bright	Apprentice	Free transfer	
Summer 1974	WG	(England)	Ian Allinson	Apprentice	Free transfer	
Summer 1974	FW	(England)	John Froggatt	(England) Boston United	£6,000	
17 August 1974	MF	(Scotland)	Jimmy Lindsay	(England) Watford	Free transfer	(Note: Date of signing refers to the date of the player's first game for the club)

- Total spending: ▼ ~ £6,000

=== Out ===
Date	Position	Nationality	Name	To	Fee	Ref.
Summer 1974	MF	(England)	Bobby Mills	(England) Chelmsford City	Nominal	
Summer 1974	MF	(England)	Tony Wingate	(England) Barnet	Released	
25 January 1975	CB	(Wales)	Stuart Morgan	(England) Bournemouth	£4,000	(Note: Date of departure refers to the date of the player's final game for the club)
February 1975	FB	(England)	Alex Smith	(England) Halifax Town	Nominal	
2 May 1975	WG	(England)	Colwyn Rowe	(England) Chelmsford City	Released	
31 March 1975	FW	(England)	Barry Dyson	(England) Chelmsford City	Released	

- Total incoming: ▲ ~ £4,000

=== Loans in ===
Date	Position	Nationality	Name	From	End date	Ref.
4 January 1975	FW	(England)	John Sims	(England) Derby County	10 January 1975	(Note: Loan start and end dates refer to the date of the player's first and final games for the club)
February 1975	FB	(Scotland)	Danny Cameron	(England) Sheffield Wednesday	4 March 1975	
February 1975	MF	(England)	Ian McDonald	(England) Liverpool	4 March 1975	

=== Loans out ===
Date	Position	Nationality	Name	To	End date	Ref.
February 1975	FW	(England)	Barry Dyson	(England) Chelmsford City	31 March 1975	(Note: Loan start and end dates refer to the date of the player's first and final games for the club)

== Match details ==
=== Third Division ===
==== Results round by round ====
Round	1	2	3	4	5	6	7	8	9	10	11	12	13	14	15	16	17	18	19	20	21	22	23	24	25	26	27	28	29	30	31	32	33	34	35	36	37	38	39	40	41	42	43	44	45	46
Ground	H	A	H	A	H	H	A	A	H	A	H	A	H	A	A	H	H	H	A	H	A	H	H	H	A	H	A	A	H	A	H	A	A	H	A	A	H	A	A	H	A	A	H	H	A	H
Result	D	L	W	D	W	W	W	D	L	D	W	W	W	L	D	D	D	L	L	W	L	W	D	W	L	D	L	L	W	L	D	D	W	W	L	W	L	L	L	W	L	L	D	W	D	W
Position	15	18	11	12	7	3	3	3	5	5	3	4	2	4	4	3	3	4	4	2	5	3	4	5	6	4	4	9	8	11	12	11	8	7	10	9	10	10	11	10	13	13	14	12	11	11

Source: 11v11.com
A = Away; H = Home; W = Win; D = Draw; L = Loss

==== League table ====
Pos	Team	Pld	W	D	L	GF	GA	GAv	Pts	Qualification or relegation
9	Preston North End	46	19	11	16	63	56	1.125	49	
10	Gillingham	46	17	14	15	65	60	1.083	48	
11	Colchester United	46	17	13	16	70	63	1.111	47	
12	Hereford United	46	16	14	16	64	66	0.970	46	
13	Wrexham	46	15	15	16	65	55	1.182	45	Qualification for the Cup Winners' Cup first round

Rules for classification: 1) Points; 2) Goal average; 3) Goals scored

==== Matches ====
17 August 1974 1	Colchester United	1–1	Watford	Colchester
	Leslie 37'	Report	Scullion 56'	Stadium: Layer Road; Attendance: 5,715; Referee: L Shapter

24 August 1974 2	Blackburn Rovers	3–2	Colchester United	Blackburn
	Martin 29'; Oates 46'; Hawkins 53'	Report	Cook 43'; Froggatt 51'	Stadium: Ewood Park; Attendance: 8,390; Referee: G Nolan

31 August 1974 3	Colchester United	1–0	Bournemouth	Colchester
	Cook 44'	Report		Stadium: Layer Road; Attendance: 4,930; Referee: R Toseland

7 September 1974 4	Chesterfield	1–1	Colchester United	Chesterfield
	Moss 83'	Report	Svarc 7'	Stadium: Saltergate; Attendance: 3,474; Referee: N Ashley

14 September 1974 5	Colchester United	3–0	Charlton Athletic	Colchester
	Leslie 23' (pen.); Thomas 31'; Svarc 67'	Report		Stadium: Layer Road; Attendance: 5,527; Referee: R Kirkpatrick

17 September 1974 6	Colchester United	1–0	Plymouth Argyle	Colchester
	Packer 90'	Report		Stadium: Layer Road; Attendance: 5,389; Referee: T Spencer

21 September 1974 7	Aldershot	0–1	Colchester United	Aldershot
		Report	Svarc 79'	Stadium: Recreation Ground; Attendance: 3,539; Referee: K Salmon

24 September 1974 8	Bury	0–0	Colchester United	Bury
		Report	Leslie (red card) 78'	Stadium: Gigg Lane; Attendance: 5,223; Referee: L Douglas

28 September 1974 9	Colchester United	1–2	Walsall	Colchester
	Svarc 56'	Report	Buckley 8', 80'	Stadium: Layer Road; Attendance: 4,877; Referee: Rob Lewis

30 September 1974 10	Port Vale	2–2	Colchester United	Burslem
	Williams 64'; Bailey 72'	Report	Froggatt 9'; Lindsay 47'	Stadium: Vale Park; Attendance: 3,722; Referee: J Cross

5 October 1974 11	Colchester United	4–2	Gillingham	Colchester
	Froggatt 20', 40'; Svarc 46', 79'	Report	Feely 18', 31'	Stadium: Layer Road; Attendance: 4,684; Referee: R Clay

12 October 1974 12	Preston North End	0–2	Colchester United	Preston
		Report	Harford 11', 84'	Stadium: Deepdale; Attendance: 10,259; Referee: J Hough

15 October 1974 13	Colchester United	2–0	Port Vale	Colchester
	Svarc 11', 30'	Report		Stadium: Layer Road; Attendance: 5,184; Referee: Ray Tinkler

23 October 1974 14	Hereford United	3–1	Colchester United	Hereford
	McNeil 7'; Redrobe 30'; Lee 70' (pen.)	Report	Thomas 88'	Stadium: Edgar Street; Attendance: 6,390; Referee: K Baker

26 October 1974 15	Halifax Town	1–1	Colchester United	Halifax
	Blair 31'	Report	Svarc 60'	Stadium: The Shay; Attendance: 1,935; Referee: I Smith

29 October 1974 16	Colchester United	1–1	Southend United	Colchester
	Lindsay 73' (pen.)	Report	Guthrie 26'	Stadium: Layer Road; Attendance: 6,547; Referee: P Richardson

2 November 1974 17	Colchester United	1–1	Wrexham	Colchester
	Svarc 20'	Report	Gareth Davies 78'	Stadium: Layer Road; Attendance: 4,432; Referee: T Page

6 November 1974 18	Colchester United	1–2	Hereford United	Colchester
	Svarc 69'	Report	McNeil 41'; Tyler 49'	Stadium: Layer Road; Attendance: 5,131; Referee: R Robinson

9 November 1974 19	Huddersfield Town	3–2	Colchester United	Huddersfield
	Gowling 17'; Gray 24'; Dolan 57'	Report	Froggatt 38'; Svarc 75'	Stadium: Leeds Road; Attendance: 5,233; Referee: D Richardson

15 November 1974 20	Colchester United	5–0	Grimsby Town	Colchester
	Froggatt 4', 12', 62'; Svarc 16', 87'	Report		Stadium: Layer Road; Attendance: 4,489; Referee: Ron Challis

30 November 1974 21	Swindon Town	4–1	Colchester United	Swindon
	Moss 20' (pen.), 54', 84' (pen.); Eastoe 22'	Report	Svarc 23'	Stadium: County Ground; Attendance: 10,072; Referee: Clive Thomas

6 December 1974 22	Colchester United	2–1	Tranmere Rovers	Colchester
	L Smith 32'; Froggatt 49'	Report	Tynan 34'	Stadium: Layer Road; Attendance: 4,554; Referee: A Glasson

20 December 1974 23	Colchester United	1–1	Crystal Palace	Colchester
	Leslie 63'	Report	Evans 28'	Stadium: Layer Road; Attendance: 6,914; Referee: A Robinson

28 December 1974 24	Colchester United	4–1	Peterborough United	Colchester
	Froggatt 2'; Dominey 4'; Cook 36'; Bradley 51' (o.g.)	Report	Turner 75'	Stadium: Layer Road; Attendance: 7,790; Referee: T Reynolds

1 January 1975 25	Charlton Athletic	4–1	Colchester United	Charlton
	Horsfield 12', 76'; Powell 39'; Warman 70'	Report	Dyson 16'	Stadium: The Valley; Attendance: 15,246; Referee: A Hamil

4 January 1975 26	Colchester United	0–0	Aldershot	Colchester
		Report		Stadium: Layer Road; Attendance: 5,096; Referee: Tom Bune

10 January 1975 27	Tranmere Rovers	2–0	Colchester United	Birkenhead
	Crossley 70' (pen.); Coppell 82'	Report		Stadium: Prenton Park; Attendance: 2,819

18 January 1975	Colchester United	A–A	Swindon Town	Colchester
	Lindsay; Cook; Morgan	Report		Stadium: Layer Road; Attendance: 4,441
Note: Match abandoned after 57-minutes with the score at 3–0 due to a waterlogged pitch.

25 January 1975 28	Brighton & Hove Albion	2–0	Colchester United	Hove
	Binney 28', 64'	Report	Morgan (red card)	Stadium: Goldstone Ground; Attendance: 9,937; Referee: B Newsome

1 February 1975 29	Colchester United	3–2	Huddersfield Town	Colchester
	Froggatt 23', 32'; Dominey 75'	Report	Gowling 59' (pen.), 73' (pen.)	Stadium: Layer Road; Attendance: 3,921; Referee: J Bent

8 February 1975 30	Wrexham	2–1	Colchester United	Wrexham
	Whittle 38'; Smallman 60'	Report	Lindsay 85'	Stadium: Racecourse Ground; Attendance: 3,433; Referee: W Johnson

15 February 1975 31	Colchester United	2–2	Brighton & Hove Albion	Colchester
	Svarc 5'; McDonald 6'	Report	Binney 14'; Towner 68'	Stadium: Layer Road; Attendance: 4,161; Referee: M Taylor

22 February 1975 32	Grimsby Town	1–1	Colchester United	Cleethorpes
	Lewis 61'	Report	McDonald 41'	Stadium: Blundell Park; Attendance: 5,608; Referee: G Trevett

1 March 1975 33	Bournemouth	0–2	Colchester United	Bournemouth
		Report	Froggatt 22'; Foley 61'	Stadium: Dean Court; Attendance: 4,578; Referee: Malcolm Sinclair

4 March 1975 34	Colchester United	2–0	Swindon Town	Colchester
	Svarc 14', 55'	Report		Stadium: Layer Road; Attendance: 4,041; Referee: L Shapter

15 March 1975 35	Walsall	5–2	Colchester United	Walsall
	Atthey 40'; Bennett 48'; Andrews 70'; Harrison 73'; Buckley 76'	Report	Foley 25'; Lindsay 64'	Stadium: Fellows Park; Attendance: 4,914; Referee: J Williams

19 March 1975 36	Watford	1–2	Colchester United	Watford
	Scullion 19'	Report	Froggatt 4'; Svarc 59'	Stadium: Vicarage Road; Attendance: 3,941; Referee: D Nippard

22 March 1975 37	Colchester United	1–2	Chesterfield	Colchester
	Lindsay 62'	Report	Shanahan 5'; Moss 17'	Stadium: Layer Road; Attendance: 4,152; Referee: R Crabb

25 March 1975 38	Crystal Palace	2–1	Colchester United	Selhurst
	Evans 67'; Cannon 78'	Report	Froggatt 54'	Stadium: Selhurst Park; Attendance: 16,851; Referee: E Read

28 March 1975 39	Peterborough United	1–0	Colchester United	Peterborough
	Gregory 79'	Report		Stadium: London Road Stadium; Attendance: 7,559

4 April 1975 40	Colchester United	2–0	Halifax Town	Colchester
	Svarc 4'; Rowe 29'	Report		Stadium: Layer Road; Attendance: 3,501; Referee: Ray Tinkler

12 April 1975 41	Gillingham	2–1	Colchester United	Gillingham
	Yeo 32'; Richardson 62'	Report	Rowe 50'	Stadium: Priestfield Stadium; Attendance: 6,504; Referee: D Biddle

15 April 1975 42	Plymouth Argyle	1–0	Colchester United	Plymouth
	Mariner 50'	Report		Stadium: Home Park; Attendance: 23,551; Referee: A Lees

19 April 1975 43	Colchester United	2–2	Preston North End	Colchester
	Bunkell 34'; Svarc 62'	Report	Smith 24'; Morley 77'	Stadium: Layer Road; Attendance: 5,228

22 April 1975 44	Colchester United	2–0	Blackburn Rovers	Colchester
	Lindsay 6'; Svarc 82'	Report		Stadium: Layer Road; Attendance: 4,183; Referee: John Homewood

25 April 1975 45	Southend United	1–1	Colchester United	Southend-on-Sea
	Dominey 44' (o.g.)	Report	Foley 78'	Stadium: Roots Hall; Attendance: 5,924; Referee: C White

2 May 1975 46	Colchester United	3–2	Bury	Colchester
	Froggatt 1'; Svarc 3', 5'	Report	Hamstead 41'; Bailey 82'	Stadium: Layer Road; Attendance: 3,202; Referee: K Salmon

=== League Cup ===
20 August 1974 1st round	Colchester United	1–0	Oxford United	Colchester
	Lindsay 27' (pen.)	Report		Stadium: Layer Road; Attendance: 4,609; Referee: M Taylor

11 September 1974 2nd round	Southend United	0–2	Colchester United	Southend-on-Sea
		Report	Leslie 64' (pen.), 67' (pen.)	Stadium: Roots Hall; Attendance: 7,865; Referee: J Bent

9 October 1974 3rd round	Colchester United	2–0	Carlisle United	Colchester
	Svarc 75'; Leslie 78' (pen.)	Report		Stadium: Layer Road; Attendance: 7,842; Referee: P Reeves

13 November 1974 4th round	Colchester United	0–0	Southampton	Colchester
		Report		Stadium: Layer Road; Attendance: 9,515; Referee: D Turner

25 November 1974 4th round replay	Southampton	0–1	Colchester United	Southampton
		Report	Dominey 58'	Stadium: The Dell; Attendance: 11,492; Referee: D Turner

3 December 1974 5th round	Colchester United	1–2	Aston Villa	Colchester
	Froggatt 84'	Report	Little 28'; Graydon 60'	Stadium: Layer Road; Attendance: 11,812; Referee: I Hunting

=== FA Cup ===
23 November 1974 1st round	Watford	0–1	Colchester United	Watford
		Report	Froggatt 75'	Stadium: Vicarage Road; Attendance: 8,228; Referee: I Hunting

14 December 1974 2nd round	Leatherhead	1–0	Colchester United	Leatherhead
	Doyle 20'	Report		Stadium: Fetcham Grove; Attendance: 3,500; Referee: A Hart

== Squad statistics ==
=== Appearances and goals ===
No.	Pos	Nat	Player	Total		Third Division		FA Cup		League Cup	
No.	Pos	Nat	Player	Apps	Goals	Apps	Goals	Apps	Goals	Apps	Goals
	GK	(Wales) WAL	Mike Walker	54	0	46	0	2	0	6	0
	DF	(England) ENG	Micky Cook	54	3	46	3	2	0	6	0
	DF	(England) ENG	Barry Dominey	32	3	22+5	2	2	0	3	1
	DF	(England) ENG	Ray Harford	49	2	40+1	2	2	0	6	0
	DF	(England) ENG	Mick Packer	37	1	30	1	2	0	5	0
	DF	(England) ENG	Lindsay Smith	49	1	38+5	1	1	0	2+3	0
	MF	(England) ENG	Ray Bunkell	34	1	23+6	1	1+1	0	3	0
	MF	(England) ENG	Steve Foley	18	3	16+2	3	0	0	0	0
	MF	(England) ENG	Steve Leslie	42	6	32+2	3	2	0	6	3
	MF	(Scotland) SCO	Jimmy Lindsay	52	7	45	6	2	0	5	1
	MF	(England) ENG	Phil Thomas	35	2	26+1	2	2	0	6	0
	FW	(England) ENG	Ian Allinson	1	0	0+1	0	0	0	0	0
	FW	(England) ENG	John Froggatt	54	18	46	16	2	1	6	1
	FW	(England) ENG	Bobby Svarc	50	25	42	24	2	0	6	1
Players who appeared for Colchester who left during the season
	DF	(Scotland) SCO	Danny Cameron	5	0	5	0	0	0	0	0
	DF	(Wales) WAL	Stuart Morgan	13	0	11	0	0	0	2	0
	DF	(England) ENG	Alex Smith	26	0	22	0	0	0	4	0
	MF	(England) ENG	Ian McDonald	5	2	5	2	0	0	0	0
	FW	(England) ENG	Barry Dyson	7	1	5+1	1	0	0	0+1	0
	FW	(England) ENG	Colwyn Rowe	11	2	4+7	2	0	0	0	0
	FW	(England) ENG	John Sims	2	0	2	0	0	0	0	0

=== Goalscorers ===
Place	Nationality	Position	Name	Third Division	FA Cup	League Cup	Total
1	(England)	FW	Bobby Svarc	24	0	1	25
2	(England)	FW	John Froggatt	16	1	1	18
3	(Scotland)	MF	Jimmy Lindsay	6	0	1	7
4	(England)	MF	Steve Leslie	3	0	3	6
5	(England)	FB	Micky Cook	3	0	0	3
5	(England)	CB	Barry Dominey	2	0	1	3
5	(England)	MF	Steve Foley	3	0	0	3
8	(England)	CB	Ray Harford	2	0	0	2
8	(England)	MF	Ian McDonald	2	0	0	2
8	(England)	WG	Colwyn Rowe	2	0	0	2
8	(England)	MF	Phil Thomas	2	0	0	2
12	(England)	MF	Ray Bunkell	1	0	0	1
12	(England)	FW	Barry Dyson	1	0	0	1
12	(England)	FB	Mick Packer	1	0	0	1
12	(England)	CB	Lindsay Smith	1	0	0	1
			Own goals	1	0	0	1
			TOTALS	70	1	7	78

=== Disciplinary record ===
Nationality	Position	Name	Third Division		FA Cup		League Cup		Total	
Nationality	Position	Name	Booked	Sent off (straight red)	Booked	Sent off (straight red)	Booked	Sent off (straight red)	Booked	Sent off (straight red)
(England)	MF	Steve Leslie	0	1	0	0	0	0	0	1
(Wales)	CB	Stuart Morgan	0	1	0	0	0	0	0	1
(England)	CB	Ray Harford	1	0	0	0	0	0	1	0
		TOTALS	1	2	0	0	0	0	1	2

=== Clean sheets ===
Number of games goalkeepers kept a clean sheet.

Place	Nationality	Player	Third Division	FA Cup	League Cup	Total
1	(Wales)	Mike Walker	13	1	5	19
		TOTALS	13	1	5	19

=== Player debuts ===
Players making their first-team Colchester United debut in a fully competitive match.

Position	Nationality	Player	Date	Opponent	Ground	Notes
MF	(Scotland)	Jimmy Lindsay	17 August 1974	Watford	Layer Road	
FW	(England)	John Froggatt	17 August 1974	Watford	Layer Road	
FW	(England)	John Sims	4 January 1975	Aldershot	Layer Road	
FB	(Scotland)	Danny Cameron	8 February 1975	Wrexham	Racecourse Ground	
MF	(England)	Ian McDonald	8 February 1975	Wrexham	Racecourse Ground	
WG	(England)	Ian Allinson	19 April 1975	Preston North End	Layer Road	

== See also ==
- List of Colchester United F.C. seasons
