= 1975–76 Colchester United F.C. season =

Colchester United
1975–76 season
- Chairman: Jack Rippingale
- Manager: Bobby Roberts
- Stadium: Layer Road
- Third Division: 22nd (relegated)
- FA Cup: 1st round (eliminated by Dover)
- League Cup: 1st round (eliminated by Crystal Palace)
- Top goalscorer: League: Steve Leslie (6); All: Steve Leslie (7)
- Highest home attendance: 6,240 v Crystal Palace, 10 January 1976
- Lowest home attendance: 2,245 v Chesterfield, 7 February 1976
- Average home league attendance: 3,385
- Biggest win: 3–1 v Crystal Palace, 25 August 1975; 2–0 v Brighton & Hove Albion, 20 September 1975 v Walsall, 11 October 1975 v Aldershot, 16 March 1976
- Biggest defeat: 0–6 v Brighton & Hove Albion, 17 January 1976
Home colours

The 1975–76 season was Colchester United's 34th season in their history and their second consecutive season in third tier of English football, the Third Division. Alongside competing in the Third Division, the club also participated in the FA Cup and the League Cup.

With Jim Smith departing for Second Division Blackburn Rovers in the summer, his former Colchester United coach Bobby Roberts was appointed manager in his place. A succession of poor results spelt relegation for Colchester, while they exited both cup competitions in the first round.

== Season overview ==
Jim Smith was prized away from Colchester by Second Division Blackburn Rovers over the summer. His coach Bobby Roberts was appointed manager but his early days in charge proved ominous for the remainder of the season. A winless first five games was only worsened by Smith returned to sign top scorer Bobby Svarc for £25,000 from the cash-strapped U's.

Colchester suffered defeat at the hands of non-League opposition in the FA Cup once again after being taken to a replay and then extra time by Dover. They were soundly beaten 4–1 at the end of extra time. They also lost out in the League Cup first round 4–3 on aggregate against Crystal Palace. Despite this, Colchester rallied for a mid-season resurgence of form to climb to twelfth position in the league table, but some crushing defeats including 6–1 at Chesterfield and 6–0 at Brighton & Hove Albion put the U's back in the relegation mire. Relegation was confirmed as Colchester finished 22nd position in the table, with Steve Leslie the club's top scorer with a record low of just six league goals.

== Players ==
As of match played 26 April 1976.

Name	Position	Nationality	Place of birth	Date of birth	Apps	Goals	Signed from	Date signed	Fee
Goalkeepers
Lee Smelt	GK	(England)	Edmonton	13 March 1958 (aged 17)	0	0	(England) Bishop's Stortford	Summer 1975	Free transfer
Mike Walker	GK	(Wales)	Colwyn Bay	28 November 1945 (aged 29)	102	0	(England) Watford	July 1973	£4,000
Defenders
Stewart Bright	FB	(England)	Colchester	13 October 1957 (aged 17)	0	0	Apprentice	Summer 1974	Free transfer
Micky Cook	FB	(England)	Enfield	9 April 1951 (aged 24)	246	9	(England) Orient	1 March 1969	Free transfer
Barry Dominey	CB	(England)	Edmonton	21 October 1955 (aged 19)	35	3	(England) Enfield WMC	September 1973	Free transfer
Derek Harrison	CB	(England)	Littlethorpe	9 February 1950 (aged 25)	0	0	(England) Torquay United	Summer 1975	Free transfer
Mick Packer	FB	(England)	Willesden	20 April 1950 (aged 25)	72	1	(England) Watford	July 1973	Free transfer
Lindsay Smith	CB	(England)	Enfield	18 September 1954 (aged 20)	138	6	Apprentice	20 April 1971 (Note: Date of signing refers to the date of the player's first game for the club)	Free transfer
Johnny Williams	FB	(England)	Tottenham	26 March 1947 (aged 28)	0	0	(England) Watford	June 1976	Undisclosed
Midfielders
Ray Bunkell	MF	(England)	Edmonton	18 September 1949 (aged 25)	40	1	(England) Swindon Town	December 1973	Part exchange
Paul Dyer	MF	(England)	Leicester	24 January 1953 (aged 22)	0	0	(England) Notts County	Summer 1975	Undisclosed
Steve Foley	MF	(England)	Clacton-on-Sea	21 June 1953 (aged 21)	109	24	Apprentice	July 1969	Free transfer
Steve Leslie	MF	(England)	Hornsey	4 September 1952 (aged 22)	146	27	Apprentice	20 April 1971	Free transfer
Forwards
Ian Allinson	WG	(England)	Hitchin	1 October 1957 (aged 17)	1	0	Apprentice	Summer 1974	Free transfer
Terry Anderson	WG	(England)	Woking	11 March 1944 (aged 31)	4	0	(United States) Baltimore Comets	23 August 1975 (Note: Date of signing refers to the date of the player's first game in his second spell for the club)	Free transfer
John Froggatt	FW	(England)	Stanton Hill	13 December 1945 (aged 29)	54	18	(England) Boston United	Summer 1974	£6,000
Colin Garwood	FW	(England)	Heacham	29 June 1949 (aged 25)	0	0	(England) Huddersfield Town	February 1976	£4,000
Bobby Gough	FW	(England)	Ladywood	20 July 1949 (aged 25)	0	0	(England) Southport	January 1976	£7,000

== Transfers ==
=== In ===
Date	Position	Nationality	Name	From	Fee	Ref.
Summer 1975	GK	(England)	Lee Smelt	(England) Bishop's Stortford	Free transfer	
Summer 1975	CB	(England)	Derek Harrison	(England) Torquay United	Free transfer	
Summer 1975	MF	(England)	Paul Dyer	(England) Notts County	Undisclosed	
June 1975	FB	(England)	Johnny Williams	(England) Watford	Undisclosed	
23 August 1975	WG	(England)	Terry Anderson	(United States) Baltimore Comets	Free transfer	(Note: Date of signing refers to the date of the player's first game in his second spell for the club)
January 1976	FW	(England)	Bobby Gough	(England) Southport	£7,000	
February 1976	FW	(England)	Colin Garwood	(England) Huddersfield Town	£4,000	

- Total spending: ▼ ~ £11,000

=== Out ===
Date	Position	Nationality	Name	To	Fee	Ref.
End of season	CB	(England)	Ray Harford	(England) Romford	Player-coach	
Summer 1975	MF	(Scotland)	Jimmy Lindsay	(England) Hereford United	£13,000	
18 August 1975	MF	(Scotland)	Bobby Roberts	(England) Colchester United	Manager	
October 1975	FW	(England)	Bobby Svarc	(England) Blackburn Rovers	£25,000	
January 1976	MF	(England)	Phil Thomas	Free agent	Retired	

- Total incoming: ▲ ~ £38,000

=== Loans in ===
Date	Position	Nationality	Name	From	End date	Ref.
16 August 1975	FB	(England)	Jon O'Donnell	(England) Cambridge United	16 August 1975	(Note: Loan start and end dates refer to the date of the player's first and final games for the club)
January 1976	FW	(England)	Billy Telford	(England) Peterborough United	7 February 1976	(Note: Loan end date refers to the date of the player's final game for the club)
24 January 1976	GK	(England)	Len Bond	(England) Bristol City	14 February 1976	
February 1976	FW	(England)	Colin Garwood	(England) Huddersfield Town	February 1976	

== Match details ==
=== Third Division ===
==== Results round by round ====
Round	1	2	3	4	5	6	7	8	9	10	11	12	13	14	15	16	17	18	19	20	21	22	23	24	25	26	27	28	29	30	31	32	33	34	35	36	37	38	39	40	41	42	43	44	45	46
Ground	A	H	A	H	A	H	A	A	H	H	A	H	H	A	A	H	A	A	H	A	H	A	H	H	A	A	H	A	H	A	H	H	A	A	H	H	H	A	H	H	A	H	H	A	A	A
Result	L	L	L	L	D	W	L	W	D	W	D	D	W	D	L	D	L	W	W	D	L	L	W	L	L	L	L	L	L	L	W	W	L	D	W	D	L	L	D	L	D	D	W	W	D	D
Position	15	24	24	24	24	21	24	21	21	18	19	17	14	14	17	18	20	18	14	12	18	19	18	19	19	19	19	21	23	23	22	19	19	24	23	21	22	23	24	24	24	24	23	21	22	22

Source: 11v11.com
A = Away; H = Home; W = Win; D = Draw; L = Loss

==== League table ====
Pos	Team	Pld	W	D	L	GF	GA	GAv	Pts	Qualification or relegation
20	Sheffield Wednesday	46	12	16	18	48	59	0.814	40	
21	Aldershot (R)	46	13	13	20	59	75	0.787	39	Relegation to the Fourth Division
22	Colchester United (R)	46	12	14	20	41	65	0.631	38	Relegation to the Fourth Division
23	Southend United (R)	46	12	13	21	65	75	0.867	37	Relegation to the Fourth Division
24	Halifax Town (R)	46	11	13	22	41	61	0.672	35	Relegation to the Fourth Division

Rules for classification: 1) Points; 2) Goal average; 3) Goals scored
(R) Relegated

==== Matches ====
16 August 1975 1	Preston North End	2–1	Colchester United	Preston
	Treacy 68', 70'	Report	Svarc 16'	Stadium: Deepdale; Attendance: 8,324; Referee: R Lee

23 August 1975 2	Colchester United	0–2	Mansfield Town	Colchester
		Report	Bird 40'; Clarke 42'	Stadium: Layer Road; Attendance: 3,333; Referee: B James

30 August 1975 3	Crystal Palace	3–2	Colchester United	Selhurst
	Unknown goalscorer	Report	Svarc 15'; Bunkell 16'	Stadium: Selhurst Park; Attendance: 13,713; Referee: R Kirkpatrick

6 September 1975 4	Colchester United	0–1	Halifax Town	Colchester
		Report	McHale 46' (pen.)	Stadium: Layer Road; Attendance: 2,819

13 September 1975 5	Hereford United	0–0	Colchester United	Hereford
		Report		Stadium: Edgar Street; Attendance: 5,577; Referee: A Hamil

20 September 1975 6	Colchester United	2–0	Brighton & Hove Albion	Colchester
	Froggatt 49'; Svarc 90'	Report		Stadium: Layer Road; Attendance: 3,176; Referee: E Read

24 September 1975 7	Chester	1–0	Colchester United	Chester
	Owen 5'	Report		Stadium: Sealand Road; Attendance: 3,954; Referee: G Flint

27 September 1975 8	Swindon Town	0–1	Colchester United	Swindon
		Report	Packer 82'	Stadium: County Ground; Attendance: 5,750; Referee: A Lees

4 October 1975 9	Colchester United	0–0	Bury	Colchester
		Report		Stadium: Layer Road; Attendance: 3,035; Referee: L Shapter

11 October 1975 10	Colchester United	2–0	Walsall	Colchester
	Froggatt 8'; Dominey 56'	Report		Stadium: Layer Road; Attendance: 2,980; Referee: L Burden

18 October 1975 11	Aldershot	2–2	Colchester United	Aldershot
	Howarth 7'; Bell 22'	Report	Foley 23', 60'	Stadium: Recreation Ground; Attendance: 3,586; Referee: D Reeves

21 October 1975 12	Colchester United	0–0	Rotherham United	Colchester
		Report		Stadium: Layer Road; Attendance: 3,468; Referee: D Lloyd

25 October 1975 13	Colchester United	1–0	Port Vale	Colchester
	Foley 17'	Report		Stadium: Layer Road; Attendance: 3,053; Referee: A Turvey

1 November 1975 14	Millwall	1–1	Colchester United	New Cross
	Hill 34'	Report	Smith 63'	Stadium: The Den; Attendance: 7,492; Referee: A Robinson

5 November 1975 15	Chesterfield	6–1	Colchester United	Chesterfield
	Darling 36', 78'; Moss 42'; Shanahan 45', 87', 90'	Report	Smith 43'	Stadium: Saltergate; Attendance: 2,906; Referee: Joe Worrall

8 November 1975 16	Colchester United	1–1	Shrewsbury Town	Colchester
	Smith 54'	Report	Bates 5'	Stadium: Layer Road; Attendance: 3,088; Referee: Ray Tinkler

15 November 1975 17	Cardiff City	2–0	Colchester United	Cardiff
	Evans 2'; Alston 83'	Report		Stadium: Ninian Park; Attendance: 6,781; Referee: T Bosi

29 November 1975 18	Gillingham	0–1	Colchester United	Gillingham
		Report	Foley 84'	Stadium: Priestfield Stadium; Attendance: 5,402; Referee: D Civil

6 December 1975 19	Colchester United	2–1	Sheffield Wednesday	Colchester
	Smith 69'; Cook 71'	Report	Potts 51'	Stadium: Layer Road; Attendance: 3,534; Referee: K Salmon

13 December 1975 20	Wrexham	1–1	Colchester United	Wrexham
	Lee 80'	Report	Froggatt 80'	Stadium: Racecourse Ground; Attendance: 2,143; Referee: I Smith

20 December 1975 21	Colchester United	0–2	Wrexham	Colchester
		Report	Lee 36'; Lyons 43'	Stadium: Layer Road; Attendance: 2,608; Referee: J Roost

26 December 1975 22	Southend United	2–0	Colchester United	Southend-on-Sea
	Brace 40', 49'	Report		Stadium: Roots Hall; Attendance: 6,167; Referee: Tom Bune

27 December 1975 23	Colchester United	1–0	Grimsby Town	Colchester
	Foley 62'	Report		Stadium: Layer Road; Attendance: 3,136; Referee: M Taylor

10 January 1976 24	Colchester United	0–3	Crystal Palace	Colchester
		Report	Taylor 7' (pen.); Swindlehurst 26'; Whittle 69'	Stadium: Layer Road; Attendance: 6,240; Referee: D Biddle

14 January 1976 25	Peterborough United	3–1	Colchester United	Peterborough
	Gregory 5'; Turner 58'; Hughes 81'	Report	Packer 88'	Stadium: London Road Stadium; Attendance: 7,453; Referee: Alf Grey

17 January 1976 26	Brighton & Hove Albion	6–0	Colchester United	Hove
	Mellor 16'; Rollings 37'; Binney 45', 64'; Fell 66', 75'	Report		Stadium: Goldstone Ground; Attendance: 16,302; Referee: T Reynolds

24 January 1976 27	Colchester United	1–4	Hereford United	Colchester
	Telford 3'	Report	McNeil 2', 38'; Dominey 27' (o.g.); Davey 87'	Stadium: Layer Road; Attendance: 2,626; Referee: D Richardson

31 January 1976 28	Rotherham United	2–0	Colchester United	Rotherham
	Spencer 30'; Leng 89'	Report		Stadium: Millmoor; Attendance: 3,943; Referee: E Garner

7 February 1976 29	Colchester United	2–3	Chesterfield	Colchester
	Bunkell 64' (pen.); Leslie 66'	Report	Cammack 20'; Fern 27'; Darling 57'	Stadium: Layer Road; Attendance: 2,245; Referee: R Crabb

14 February 1976 30	Shrewsbury Town	1–0	Colchester United	Shrewsbury
	Kearney 82'	Report		Stadium: Gay Meadow; Attendance: 4,485; Referee: T Spencer

21 February 1976 31	Colchester United	3–2	Cardiff City	Colchester
	Froggatt 60'; Garwood 64', 80'	Report	Dwyer 18'; Anderson 86' (pen.)	Stadium: Layer Road; Attendance: 3,248; Referee: B Martin

24 February 1976 32	Colchester United	1–0	Chester	Colchester
	Gough 54'	Report		Stadium: Layer Road; Attendance: 3,534; Referee: E Read

28 February 1976 33	Port Vale	3–2	Colchester United	Burslem
	Cullerton 8'; Brownbill 75'; Bailey 90'	Report	Dyer 20', 63'	Stadium: Vale Park; Attendance: 2,803; Referee: C Seel

13 March 1976 34	Walsall	1–1	Colchester United	Walsall
	Andrews 3'	Report	Leslie 64'	Stadium: Fellows Park; Attendance: 5,371; Referee: K Styles

16 March 1976 35	Colchester United	2–0	Aldershot	Colchester
	Gough 32'; Leslie 70'	Report		Stadium: Layer Road; Attendance: 3,040; Referee: P Reeves

20 March 1976 36	Colchester United	2–2	Gillingham	Colchester
	Bunkell 62'; Leslie 65'	Report	Richardson 74' (pen.); Durrell 84'	Stadium: Layer Road; Attendance: 3,981; Referee: C White

23 March 1976 37	Colchester United	0–1	Millwall	Colchester
		Report	Brisley 27'	Stadium: Layer Road; Attendance: 4,573; Referee: A Robinson

27 March 1976 38	Sheffield Wednesday	1–0	Colchester United	Sheffield
	Henson 72'	Report		Stadium: Hillsborough Stadium; Attendance: 6,905; Referee: R Perkin

3 April 1976 39	Colchester United	1–1	Preston North End	Colchester
	Leslie 34'	Report	Elwiss 17'; Williams (red card) 37'	Stadium: Layer Road; Attendance: 2,657; Referee: M Taylor

6 April 1976 40	Colchester United	1–2	Swindon Town	Colchester
	Leslie 23'	Report	Anderson 17' (pen.); Syrett 26'	Stadium: Layer Road; Attendance: 2,694; Referee: B James

12 April 1976 41	Bury	0–0	Colchester United	Bury
		Report	Froggatt (red card) 65'	Stadium: Gigg Lane; Attendance: 4,505; Referee: J Yates

16 April 1976 42	Colchester United	1–1	Peterborough United	Colchester
	Bunkell 2'; Foley (red card) 70'	Report	Leslie 48' (o.g.); Hughes (red card) 70'	Stadium: Layer Road; Attendance: 3,687; Referee: Rob Lewis

17 April 1976 43	Colchester United	2–1	Southend United	Colchester
	Gough 60'; Froggatt 69'	Report	Moody 44' (pen.)	Stadium: Layer Road; Attendance: 4,260; Referee: A Glasson

19 April 1976 44	Grimsby Town	0–1	Colchester United	Cleethorpes
		Report	Gough 18'	Stadium: Blundell Park; Attendance: 4,862; Referee: G Nolan

24 April 1976 45	Mansfield Town	0–0	Colchester United	Mansfield
		Report		Stadium: Field Mill; Attendance: 7,407

26 April 1976 46	Halifax Town	1–1	Colchester United	Halifax
	Smith 74' (o.g.)	Report	Gough 25'	Stadium: The Shay; Attendance: 856; Referee: A Hamil

=== League Cup ===
18 August 1975 1st round 1st leg	Crystal Palace	3–0	Colchester United	Selhurst
	Swindlehurst 2'; Kemp 26', 49'	Report		Stadium: Selhurst Park; Attendance: 10,006; Referee: R Robinson

25 August 1975 1st round 2nd leg	Colchester United	3–1	Crystal Palace	Colchester
	Svarc 40', 68'; Smith 66'	Report	Chatterton 16'	Stadium: Layer Road; Attendance: 3,912; Referee: R Robinson
Note: Colchester lost 4–3 on aggregate

=== FA Cup ===
22 November 1975 1st round	Colchester United	3–3	Dover	Colchester
	Leslie 24'; Dominey 40'; Smith 75'	Report	Coupland 16'; Waite 45'; Rogers 82'	Stadium: Layer Road; Attendance: 3,705; Referee: B James

26 November 1975 1st round replay	Dover	4–1 (a.e.t.)	Colchester United	River
	Hamshire 52'; Coxhill 102' (pen.); Coupland 108', 120'	Report	Packer 60' (pen.)	Stadium: Crabble Athletic Ground; Attendance: 3,779; Referee: B James

== Squad statistics ==
=== Appearances and goals ===
No.	Pos	Nat	Player	Total		Third Division		FA Cup		League Cup	
No.	Pos	Nat	Player	Apps	Goals	Apps	Goals	Apps	Goals	Apps	Goals
	GK	(Wales) WAL	Mike Walker	47	0	43	0	2	0	2	0
	DF	(England) ENG	Stewart Bright	20	0	18+2	0	0	0	0	0
	DF	(England) ENG	Micky Cook	43	1	39	1	2	0	2	0
	DF	(England) ENG	Barry Dominey	42	2	32+6	1	2	1	2	0
	DF	(England) ENG	Derek Harrison	8	0	5+2	0	1	0	0	0
	DF	(England) ENG	Mick Packer	46	3	44	2	2	1	0	0
	DF	(England) ENG	Lindsay Smith	45	6	39+2	4	2	1	2	1
	DF	(England) ENG	Johnny Williams	39	0	36	0	2	0	1	0
	MF	(England) ENG	Ray Bunkell	45	4	40+1	4	2	0	2	0
	MF	(England) ENG	Paul Dyer	40	2	34+2	2	2	0	2	0
	MF	(England) ENG	Steve Foley	30	5	26+3	5	1	0	0	0
	MF	(England) ENG	Steve Leslie	41	7	36+3	6	2	1	0	0
	FW	(England) ENG	Ian Allinson	5	0	3+2	0	0	0	0	0
	FW	(England) ENG	Terry Anderson	18	0	13+3	0	1+1	0	0	0
	FW	(England) ENG	John Froggatt	44	5	41	5	1	0	2	0
	FW	(England) ENG	Colin Garwood	15	2	15	2	0	0	0	0
	FW	(England) ENG	Bobby Gough	22	5	22	5	0	0	0	0
Players who appeared for Colchester who left during the season
	GK	(England) ENG	Len Bond	3	0	3	0	0	0	0	0
	DF	(England) ENG	Jon O'Donnell	1	0	1	0	0	0	0	0
	MF	(Scotland) SCO	Bobby Roberts	1	0	0	0	0	0	1	0
	MF	(England) ENG	Phil Thomas	10	0	7+1	0	0	0	2	0
	FW	(England) ENG	Bobby Svarc	10	5	8	3	0	0	2	2
	FW	(England) ENG	Billy Telford	2	1	1+1	1	0	0	0	0

=== Goalscorers ===
Place	Nationality	Position	Name	Third Division	FA Cup	League Cup	Total
1	(England)	MF	Steve Leslie	6	1	0	7
2	(England)	CB	Lindsay Smith	4	1	1	6
3	(England)	MF	Steve Foley	5	0	0	5
3	(England)	FW	John Froggatt	5	0	0	5
3	(England)	FW	Bobby Gough	5	0	0	5
3	(England)	FW	Bobby Svarc	3	0	2	5
7	(England)	MF	Ray Bunkell	4	0	0	4
8	(England)	FB	Mick Packer	2	1	0	3
9	(England)	CB	Barry Dominey	1	1	0	2
9	(England)	MF	Paul Dyer	2	0	0	2
9	(England)	FW	Colin Garwood	2	0	0	2
12	(England)	FB	Micky Cook	1	0	0	1
12	(England)	FW	Billy Telford	1	0	0	1
			Own goals	0	0	0	0
			TOTALS	41	4	3	48

=== Disciplinary record ===
Nationality	Position	Name	Third Division		FA Cup		League Cup		Total	
Nationality	Position	Name	Booked	Sent off (straight red)	Booked	Sent off (straight red)	Booked	Sent off (straight red)	Booked	Sent off (straight red)
(England)	MF	Steve Foley	0	1	0	0	0	0	0	1
(England)	FW	John Froggatt	0	1	0	0	0	0	0	1
(England)	FB	Micky Cook	1	0	0	0	0	0	1	0
(England)	FB	Johnny Williams	1	0	0	0	0	0	1	0
		TOTALS	2	2	0	0	0	0	2	2

=== Clean sheets ===
Number of games goalkeepers kept a clean sheet.

Place	Nationality	Player	Third Division	FA Cup	League Cup	Total
1	(Wales)	Mike Walker	14	0	0	14
		TOTALS	14	0	0	14

=== Player debuts ===
Players making their first-team Colchester United debut in a fully competitive match.

Position	Nationality	Player	Date	Opponent	Ground	Notes
MF	(England)	Paul Dyer	16 August 1975	Preston North End	Deepdale	
CB	(England)	Derek Harrison	16 August 1975	Preston North End	Deepdale	
FB	(England)	Jon O'Donnell	16 August 1975	Preston North End	Deepdale	
FB	(England)	Johnny Williams	23 August 1975	Mansfield Town	Layer Road	
FB	(England)	Stewart Bright	8 November 1975	Shrewsbury Town	Layer Road	
FW	(England)	Bobby Gough	10 January 1976	Crystal Palace	Layer Road	
GK	(England)	Len Bond	24 January 1976	Hereford United	Layer Road	
FW	(England)	Billy Telford	24 January 1976	Hereford United	Layer Road	
FW	(England)	Colin Garwood	14 February 1976	Shrewsbury Town	Gay Meadow	

== See also ==
- List of Colchester United F.C. seasons
