= Paul Taylor =

Paul Taylor may refer to:

== Arts and entertainment ==
- Paul Taylor (choreographer) (1930–2018), US choreographer
  - Paul Taylor Dance Company, a contemporary dance company
- Paul Taylor (saxophonist) (born 1960), American smooth jazz saxophonist
- Paul Taylor (keyboardist) (born 1960), American musician with Winger
- Paul Harrison Taylor (born 1957), Israeli sculptor
- Paul Taylor (art critic) (1957–1992), Australian art critic, curator, editor and publisher
- Paul Taylor (DJ) (born 1957), English club DJ
- Paul Taylor (director), British director of documentary film We Are Together
- Paul Taylor (comedian) (born 1986), British-Irish comedian

== Politics ==
- J. Paul Taylor (politician) (1920–2023), American politician, member of the New Mexico House of Representatives
- Paul D. Taylor (1939–2021), American ambassador
- Paul Frederick Taylor (born 1939), Canadian politician
- Paul M. Taylor (born 1982), Canadian food-security activist and political candidate

== Sports ==
- Paul Taylor (cricketer, born 1939), former English cricketer
- Paul Taylor (cricketer, born 1964), English cricketer
- Paul Taylor (fighter) (born 1979), English mixed martial artist
- Paul Taylor (footballer, born 1949), English football player and manager
- Paul Taylor (footballer, born 1966) (born 1966), Scottish footballer
- Paul Taylor (footballer, born 1987), English footballer who plays as a striker
- Paul Taylor (Gaelic footballer), played for and later managed Sligo
- Paul Taylor (rugby league) (born 1959), Australian rugby league footballer of the 1980s and 1990s
- Paul Taylor (rugby league, born 1947), Cronulla-Sutherland Sharks player
- Paul Taylor (bowls) (born 1988), Welsh lawn bowler
- Paul Taylor (referee) (born 1959), English football referee
- Paul Taylor III (born 1955), American professional wrestler known as Terry Taylor

== Other ==
- Paul C. Taylor (born 1967), professor of philosophy at Vanderbilt University, philosopher of race
- Paul Graham Taylor, emeritus professor of international relations at the London School of Economics and Political Science
- Paul Schuster Taylor (1895–1984), American agricultural economist
- Paul W. Taylor (1923–2015), American environmental philosopher
- Paul Taylor (priest) (born 1953), Archdeacon of Sherborne
- Paul Taylor (engineer) (1939–2021), pioneer in development of TTD (telecommunications device for the deaf), a.k.a. TTY
- Paul Taylor, English murderer, see Murder of Anthony Walker
- J. Paul Taylor (physician), American physician scientist and research hospital director

== See also ==
- Nigel Paul Taylor (born 1956), British botanist
