= Aimson =

Aimson is an English surname. Notable people with the surname include:

- Paul Aimson (1943–2008), English footballer
- Will Aimson (born 1994), English footballer
