= Genteel poverty =

Social class and literary trope

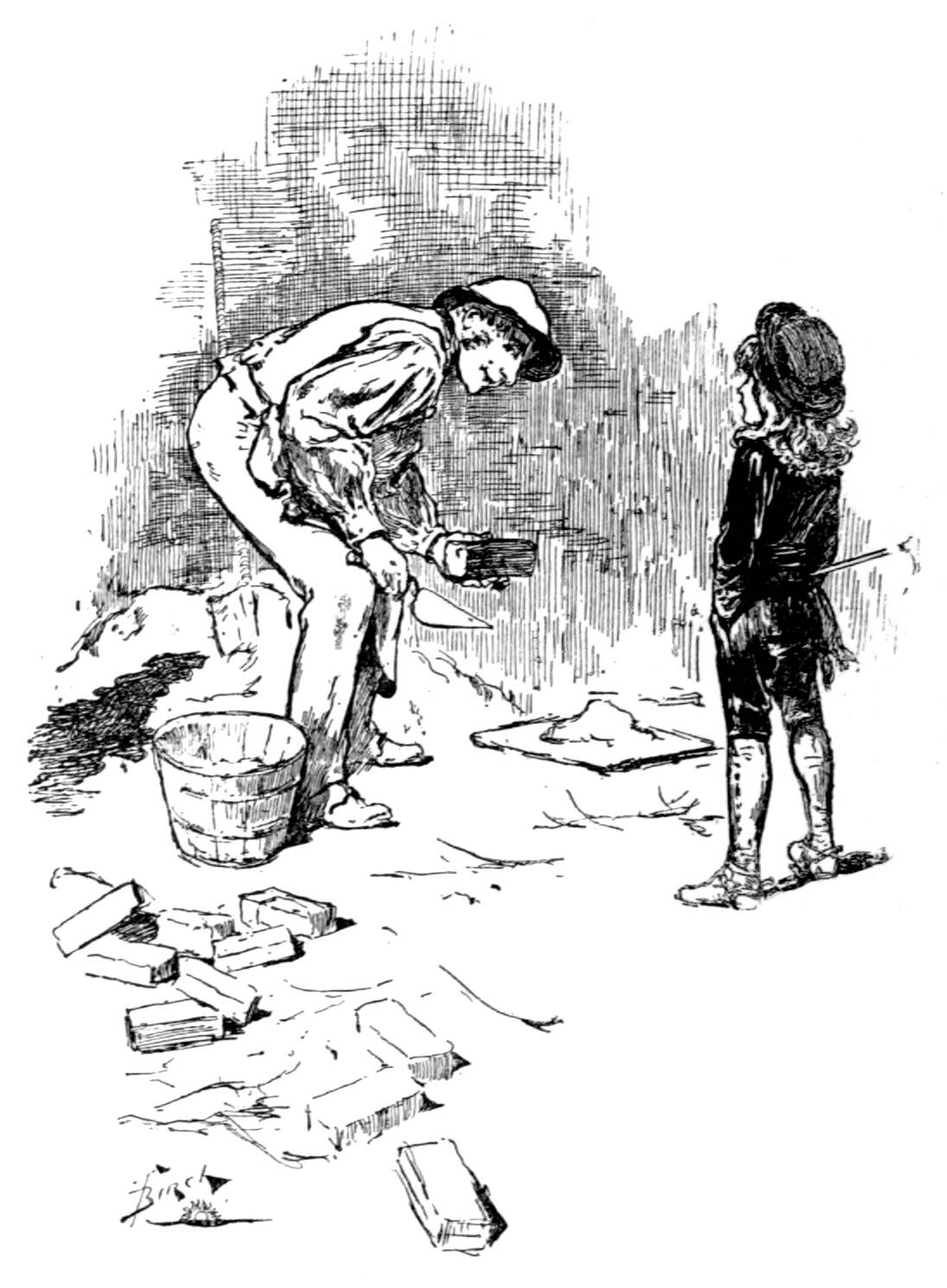
Illustration from an 1886 edition of Little Lord Fauntleroy. The book contrasts the genteel poor main character’s more refined mannerisms with the true working poor.

Genteel poverty is a state of poverty marked by one's connection or affectation towards a higher ("genteel") social class. Those in genteel poverty are often people, possibly titled, who have fallen from wealth out of various circumstances. The term can extend down to the lower-middle class.

Spinsters from wealthy families were likely to fall into genteel poverty during the points in history that barred women from earning a living wage through work. Aristocratic families with a lack of male heirs risk falling into genteel poverty if the family money then passes out of the household to the oldest male relative. Those described as the genteel poor who come from the aristocratic class may still retain one or more servants and live off rental income or income from a country estate, although the money may not sufficiently cover daily expenses or the luxuries typical to those from a lineage of landed gentry. The genteel poor may also describe those on fixed income such as pensioners. Genteel poverty is often associated with vicars, who tend to come from privileged highly-educated backgrounds but earn an amount determined by their local parish.

Working-class people who have a higher level of education or training such as teachers or skilled artisans may be considered members of the genteel poor.

== Usage ==
The term genteel poverty peaked in usage in the late 19th century.

=== Literary usage ===
Characters in genteel poverty are often seen in English literature of the 19th and early 20th centuries. The genteel poor as seen in those works are typically not working class. Notable books containing characters who are members of the genteel poor include I Capture the Castle, Little Lord Fauntleroy, and many of the works of Jane Austen; Austen herself faced genteel poverty from the death of her father. For example, in Emma, Miss Bates and Mrs. Bates have fallen into genteel poverty because of the death of Mr. Bates, who was Highbury's clergyman. In Sense and Sensibility, the main characters, the Dashwoods, fall into genteel poverty as their family inheritance passes to the family patriarch's son by his first wife.

The term can also describe people from working-class backgrounds who pretend towards a higher class through their interests and affectations. For example, Leonard Bast of the 1910 novel Howards End is a lower-middle class insurance clerk who reads and attends lectures in the pursuit of self-improvement. Forster thus ironically alludes to the English fixation on the genteel poor:

We are not concerned with the very poor. They are unthinkable, and only to be approached by the statistician or the poet. This story deals with gentlefolk, or with those who are obliged to pretend that they are gentlefolk.

Charlotte Brontë’s Jane Eyre may be considered a unique example of genteel poverty. As an orphan with no wealth or family to support her, Jane has very limited material means. However, she is not seen as “working class” because she was raised and educated as a gentlewoman. Her job as a governess (a position often filled by women of Jane’s background) highlights the status. Governesses were expected to have the manners, speech, and values of the upper classes, but because they earned a living, they did not fully belong to that world. That placed them in an awkward social position as too refined to be servants but too poor and dependent to be equals of the families that they served.

In her literary reviews, Elizabeth Eastlake expressed a conflicted and critical view of the governess role. On one hand, she believed a governess should be a "lady in every sense," someone well-born, well-mannered, and well-educated, just like herself. At the same time, she recognized that the governess as fitting in nowhere and saw her as socially isolated and uncomfortable. The governess could not mix easily with gentlemen, and the servants resented her because she was a dependent but still somehow above them. Eastlake’s view highlights how the governess’s role, like other working members of the genteel poverty class, was deeply unstable and lonely and reflected the tensions around class, gender, and labor in Victorian society.

Characters like Jane Eyre or Becky Sharp may technically cross class boundaries through marriage, but they are not "working girls" in the traditional sense. Instead, they are impoverished gentlewomen; women of social pedigree but lacking financial resources. These characters were acceptable marriage partners for upper-class men precisely because they retained the cultural capital of gentility. Victorian ideology idealized the wife as the “Angel in the House”, a figure who maintained the household’s respectability by performing domestic rituals, adhering to etiquette, organizing social visits, and overseeing servants; all tasks that required class literacy and etiquette. This meant that a man’s class identity depended on his wife’s performance of middle-class values. Genteel poverty in women was thus a socially useful condition in Victorian literature: it preserved class boundaries while offering a narrative of virtue and resilience. It allowed a woman to participate in society while still maintaining the illusion of domesticity. In contrast, lower working-class women, who were associated with physical labor and “dirt,” as shown in the real-life case of Hannah Cullwick, embodied the opposite of middle-class femininity and therefore were excluded from the sphere of legitimate marriage plots in fiction.

Genteel poverty served an important ideological function in Victorian society and its fiction. It allowed for a distinction between the acceptable and unacceptable poor: those who were poor but retained their class performance (impoverished gentlemen and gentlewomen), and those whose poverty was visible (the working-class). Genteel poverty was not merely a condition; it was a performance, and one that was necessary to sustain the Victorian power structure in literary works.

=== Modern usage ===
Theodore Dalrymple suggested that the genteel poor as a phenomenon had disappeared by the 1960s and the 1970s because of the decline of the genteel social class (that is, the British gentry) as well as inflation. In the book The Careless State, scholar Paul Graham Taylor characterized the British welfare state as including a pension sufficient to keep one in genteel poverty.

Some writers have described the state of many modern creatives as genteel poverty, including writer Cosmo Landesman, who calls this group the "undeserving not-quite-poor": those who may have enough cash flow to afford small luxuries but have trouble saving for larger expenses like medical debt or retirement. Landesman attributes this to a laissez-faire baby boomer attitude towards money, driven by a distaste for conventionally responsible squares and a pessimistic view of the future, combined with an increasingly limited welfare state and uncertain economy.

== See also ==
- Bourgeois
- High culture
- Landed gentry
- Nouveau pauvre
- Old Philadelphians
- Social status
