= Darren Cann (footballer) =

English footballer (born 1969)

Personal information
- Full name: Darren John Cann
- Date of birth: 17 June 1969 (age 57)
- Place of birth: Torquay, England
- Position: Central defender

Youth career
- Torquay United

Senior career*
Years	Team	Apps	(Gls)
1986–1988	Torquay United	12	(1)
- → Weymouth (loan)
1988–?	Barnstaple Town		
- Clevedon Town
	Gloucester City	13?	(0)
?–1995	Elmore		
1995–1998	Taunton Town		
1996	Bath City (loan)	1	(0)
1998–1999	Minehead Town		
1999–2001	Taunton Town		
- Dartmouth
- Newton Abbot
- Penzance
- * Club domestic league appearances and goals

Darren Cann (born 17 June 1969) is an English former professional footballer who played as a central defender. He is the men's soccer coach at St. Thomas University in New Brunswick.

== Career ==
Cann was born in Torquay. He joined Torquay United as an apprentice, making his debut v Burnley in the 1986–87 season whilst still an apprentice as Torquay, managed by Stuart Morgan struggled to retain their place in the Football League. He turned professional in June 1987, but was released at the end of the following season having made 12 league appearances, scoring one goal. In 1987 Cann was selected to represent the FA Colts 11. While with Torquay, he also had a spell on loan with Weymouth.

In July 1988 he joined Barnstaple Town and embarked on a successful career in semi-professional football. He later played for Clevedon Town, joining Gloucester City in the 1994–95 season. He played 13 times for Gloucester and was sent off in his final game, away to Atherstone United, before joining Elmore. In the summer of 1995 he left Elmore to join Taunton Town's successful Western League side, winning a Championship medal in his first season. He played one Conference game for Bath City in December 1996, before leaving Taunton for Minehead Town in the summer of 1998.

He helped Minehead to promotion and the Western League First Division title before returning to Taunton Town in the 1999 close-season, also playing for Tiverton Town, Dartmouth A.F.C. and Newton Abbot in the Devon County Football League, when available and had also played for Penzance. The following two seasons saw Taunton retain the Western League title, giving Cann his third winner's medal. During his playing career Cann was selected to play for Devon County FA 18 times.

He emigrated to his wife's hometown in New Brunswick, Canada at the end of the 2000–01 season, one of his final games for Taunton being the 2–1 FA Vase Final win over Berkhamsted Town on 6 May 2001 at Villa Park. This was especially apt for Cann as the tournament was sponsored by Carlsberg, for which he worked as a lorry driver.

On arriving in Canada he coached with the Fredericton and District Soccer Association at several soccer camps, building on his previous experience as a tournament coordinator for the Riviera International Cup held in Torbay.

On 18 July 2001, Cann was appointed as head coach to the University of New Brunswick men's soccer team, but left in 2003 when the job was turned into a position requiring a university degree. In October 2003, Cann was appointed as men's soccer coach at St Thomas University, also in New Brunswick. Cann received the ACAA Coach of the year for the season 2008–09.
