= Ray Lugg =

English footballer (born 1948)

Personal information
- Full name: Raymond Lugg
- Date of birth: 18 July 1948 (age 78)
- Place of birth: Jarrow, England
- Height: 5 ft 9 in (1.75 m)
- Position: Midfielder

Senior career*
Years	Team	Apps	(Gls)
1965–1969	Middlesbrough	37	(3)
1969–1972	Watford	59	(3)
1972–1973	Plymouth Argyle	24	(1)
1973–1978	Crewe Alexandra	185	(10)
1978–1980	Bury	71	(2)
Total		376	(19)
- * Club domestic league appearances and goals

Raymond Lugg (born 18 July 1948) is an English former professional footballer who played mainly as a midfielder for Middlesbrough, Watford, Plymouth Argyle, Crewe Alexandra and Bury during a 15-year career from the late 1960s through to 1980.

Lugg was born in Jarrow, and played for his hometown club, Jarrow Vikings, before joining Middlesbrough in 1965, where he helped them win promotion in 1968. Unable to retain a first-team place the following season, he was sold to Watford, who he also helped to promotion as well as helping reach an FA Cup semi-final in 1970 (beating Stoke City and Liverpool en route). He spent a season at Plymouth and then five years at Crewe, making 185 appearances. He was sold to Bury for £17,000, and later played for Chorley.

Lugg played a summer with Fort Lauderdale Strikers and was later a football coach in Fort Lauderdale in Florida.
