= John Cozens (footballer) =

English footballer and manager

John William Cozens
Personal information
- Full name: John William Cozens
- Date of birth: 14 May 1946 (age 80)
- Place of birth: Hammersmith, England
- Position: Forward

Senior career*
Years	Team	Apps	(Gls)
19xx–1965	Tonbridge		
1965–1968	Hayes		
1968–1970	Hillingdon Borough		
1970–1973	Notts County	45	(13)
1973–1978	Peterborough United	132	(41)
1977–1980	Cambridge United	61	(3)

Managerial career
- 1983–1984: Cambridge United (caretaker)
- 1985: Cambridge United (caretaker)
- 1988–1989: King's Lynn
- * Club domestic league appearances and goals

John William Cozens (born 14 May 1946) is an English former professional footballer who played in the Football League as a forward for Notts County, Peterborough United and Cambridge United. He began his career in non-league football with Tonbridge, was a prolific goalscorer for three seasons for Hayes, and signed professional forms with Hillingdon Borough in 1968, before moving into league football. Cozens went on to coach at Cambridge United, becoming assistant manager and on occasions caretaker manager, and managed non-league club King's Lynn for six months in the 1988–99 season.
