= Ray Ternent =

English footballer (born 1948)

Personal information
- Full name: Raymond Ternent
- Date of birth: 9 September 1948 (age 78)
- Place of birth: Blyth, England
- Height: 5 ft 9 in (1.75 m)
- Position: Full back

Senior career*
Years	Team	Apps	(Gls)
1966–1971	Burnley	13	(0)
1971–1973	Southend United	82	(1)
1973–1977	Doncaster Rovers	84	(3)
1977–??	Frickley Athletic		
- * Club domestic league appearances and goals

Raymond Ternent (born 9 September 1948) is an English former football defender, who played in the Football League in the 1960s and 1970s.

He was spotted by scout Jack Hixon in his native north-east and Ternent joined Burnley from school in April 1964 and made his first team debut against Southampton on 8 April 1967.

However, Ternent only managed 13 league appearances for Burnley before moving to Southend United in June 1971, where he was part of the 1971-72 team who were promoted from Division Four. After two seasons he moved back north with Doncaster Rovers and also made over 80 league appearances for them before moving into non-league football with Frickley Athletic.

Despite being at Burnley at the same time as Stan Ternent, Stan and Ray were not brothers, contrary to some reports.
