= Phil Warman =

English footballer

Personal information
- Full name: Philip Roy Warman
- Date of birth: 18 December 1950 (age 75)
- Place of birth: Bromley, London, England
- Position: Left back

Senior career*
Years	Team	Apps	(Gls)
1969–1981	Charlton Athletic	316	(19)
1981–1982	Millwall	27	(1)
Total		343	(20)
- * Club domestic league appearances and goals

Philip Roy Warman (born 18 December 1950) is an English footballer who had played as a left back in the Football League.
