= Bruce Stuckey =

English footballer

Personal information
- Date of birth: 19 February 1947 (age 79)
- Place of birth: Torquay, England
- Position: Right winger

Youth career
- –1965: Exeter City

Senior career*
| Years | Team | Apps | (Gls) |
| 1965–1968 | Exeter City | 39 | (6) |
| 1968–1970 | Sunderland | 26 | (2) |
| 1970–1973 | Torquay United | 88 | (6) |
| 1973–1977 | Reading | 97 | (7) |
| 1975 | → Torquay United (loan) | 4 | (0) |
| 1976 | → Bournemouth (loan) | 5 | (0) |
| 1977 | Connecticut Bicentennials | 13 | (1) |
| Total | | 272 | (22) |
- * Club domestic league appearances and goals

Bruce Stuckey (born 19 February 1947) is an English former professional footballer who played as a right winger. Active in both England and the United States, Stuckey made over 250 career appearances.

== Career ==
Born in Torquay, Stuckey began his career with the youth team of Exeter City, and made his debut for the senior team in the Football League during the 1965–1966 season. Stuckey also played in the Football League for Sunderland, Torquay United, Reading and Bournemouth, before playing in the North American Soccer League with the Connecticut Bicentennials.
