= Graham Oates (footballer, born 1949) =

English footballer

Personal information
- Date of birth: 14 March 1949 (age 77)
- Place of birth: Bradford, England
- Height: 6 ft 2 in (1.88 m)
- Positions: Defender; midfielder

Youth career
- Manningham Mills

Senior career*
Years	Team	Apps	(Gls)
1969–1974	Bradford City	161	(19)
1974–1976	Blackburn Rovers	76	(10)
1976–1978	Newcastle United	35	(3)
1978–1980	Detroit Express	86	(17)
1981	California Surf	24	(5)
- * Club domestic league appearances and goals

Graham Oates (born 14 March 1949) is an English former footballer who played as defender or midfielder. He played for Bradford City, Blackburn Rovers and Newcastle United in England, and Detroit Express and the California Surf in the North American Soccer League (NASL).

Oates scored an own goal against Leeds United in the fourth minute of his home debut for Newcastle, lobbing goalkeeper Willie McFaul.

While a member of the Detroit Express, Oates coached the Bloomfield Hills Andover High School boys soccer team through the 1978 and 1979 seasons. In his first stint as a head coach, Oates led the 1978 squad to the Michigan High School State Soccer Championship.
