= Ray Harford =

English footballer & manager

Personal information
- Full name: Raymond Thomas Harford
- Date of birth: 1 June 1945
- Place of birth: Halifax, England
- Date of death: 9 August 2003 (aged 58)
- Height: 6 ft 1 in (1.85 m)
- Position: Central defender

Youth career
- 1961–1964: Charlton Athletic

Senior career*
| Years | Team | Apps | (Gls) |
| 1964–1966 | Charlton Athletic | 3 | (0) |
| 1966–1967 | Exeter City | 55 | (1) |
| 1967–1971 | Lincoln City | 161 | (10) |
| 1971 | Mansfield Town | 7 | (0) |
| 1971–1973 | Port Vale | 20 | (1) |
| 1973 | → Colchester United (loan) | 3 | (0) |
| 1973–1975 | Colchester United | 105 | (4) |
| 1975 | Romford | 5 | (1) |
| Total | | 359 | (17) |

Managerial career
- 1984–1986: Fulham
- 1987–1990: Luton Town
- 1990–1991: Wimbledon
- 1995–1996: Blackburn Rovers
- 1997: West Bromwich Albion
- 1997–1998: Queens Park Rangers
- 2000: Millwall (caretaker)
- * Club domestic league appearances and goals

Raymond Thomas Harford (1 June 1945 – 9 August 2003) was an English footballer, better known for his successes as a coach and manager than as a player. He is considered to have been one of the top coaches of his generation.

During his playing days, he was a central defender and made 354 league appearances in an eleven-year career in the Football League. He began as a youth player at Charlton Athletic in 1960. However, he only managed three league appearances before his departure in 1966, when he joined Exeter City. He then moved on to Lincoln City, making 161 league appearances for the club before his departure to Mansfield Town. He was bought by Port Vale for a £5,000 fee in December 1971, who then sold him on to Colchester United in February 1973 for £1,750. He helped Colchester to promotion out of the Fourth Division in 1973–74 before he moved into non-League football with Romford in 1975, before retiring due to a knee injury.

He was appointed as Fulham manager in April 1984, though he resigned in June 1986 after a financial crisis led to his team suffering relegation. He took charge at Luton Town in June 1987 and led the club to the final of the League Cup in 1988 and 1989, as Luton won the cup in 1988 before tasting defeat in 1989. Sacked in January 1990, he was appointed Wimbledon manager in the summer before he resigned in October 1991. After spending four years as Kenny Dalglish's assistant, he was promoted to manager at Blackburn Rovers in June 1995. However, he resigned in October 1996 following the sale of star striker Alan Shearer. Taking charge at West Bromwich Albion in February 1997, he switched clubs to Queens Park Rangers ten months later. He was sacked in September 1998 and subsequently became a coach at Millwall; he was still on the coaching staff at the club at the time of his death.

== Playing career ==
He was born in Halifax. He grew up in south London. He started his playing career as a centre-half at Charlton Athletic as an amateur in May 1961, turning professional at Frank Hill's Second Division side in May 1964. He joined Exeter City for a fee of £750 in January 1966 following a recommendation to the club trainer Jock Basford, who was at Charlton when Harford joined them from school. He made his debut in a 5–2 defeat to Peterborough United at St James Park and missed just one Third Division game in the remainder of the 1965–66 season. He played in 38 league matches throughout the 1966–67 season, scoring one goal against Bradford Park Avenue.

In July 1967, he signed with Lincoln City, then in the Fourth Division and led by Ron Gray. The "Imps" missed out on promotion by five points in 1968–69 and finished eighth in 1969–70, before dropping down to the re-election zone under Bert Loxley in 1970–71. Harford had played nearly 200 games in four years at Sincil Bank. In June 1971, he secured a move to Third Division Mansfield Town, quickly followed by a move to league rivals Port Vale in December 1971, whose manager Gordon Lee paid Mansfield £5,000 for his services. He was a regular for the rest of the season but fell out of favour in August 1972. In January 1973, he was loaned out to Jim Smith's Colchester United, before the deal was made permanent the next month for a price of £1,750. The Layer Road side finished in the Football League's re-election zone in 1972–73, with Harford making 21 appearances, scoring one goal.

The "U's" secured promotion in 1973–74 with a third-place finish; Harford was also given the Colchester United Player of the Year award in 1974 for his performances in this 48 games that season. After another 49 appearances in the 1974–75 campaign, he left the United to play for non-League Romford. The next year, knee troubles ended his playing career, and he returned to Colchester as youth coach in September 1975.

== Managerial career ==
=== Fulham ===
In 1982, Harford was appointed assistant manager at Fulham under Malcolm Macdonald, helping the side finish fourth in the Second Division a year after promotion – one place short of promotion to the First Division. In April 1984, he was promoted to the position of manager. His first full season as a manager was reasonably successful, with the club managing a ninth-place finish, nine points off promotion. At the end of the season, however, the club had fallen into severe financial difficulties, forcing the sale of most of the first team. Harford was able to cobble together a side for the next season from free transfers and youth players, but it wasn't enough. The side were relegated by a huge margin, and Harford resigned shortly afterwards.

=== Luton Town ===
In the summer of 1986, Luton Town manager David Pleat resigned and was replaced by John Moore. Harford was signed by Luton as assistant manager and helped the club finish seventh in the old First Division. At the end of the 1986–87 season, Moore resigned as manager and Harford was promoted as his replacement. It proved to be an impressive decision. In his first season as Luton manager, Harford guided the Kenilworth Road club to a 3–2 win over Arsenal in the League Cup final – the club's first ever major trophy. But Luton were forbidden to enter the 1988–89 UEFA Cup because the ban on English teams in European competition arising from the 1985 Heysel Stadium disaster still had two years to run. They also reached the FA Cup semi-finals that year, losing 2–1 to eventual winners Wimbledon – which made Luton the latest of several clubs to have come close to winning the then elusive domestic cup double.

In 1988–89, Luton again reached the League Cup final but surrendered their crown after losing 3–1 to Nottingham Forest. By the following January, Luton were battling against relegation to the Second Division. Harford was controversially sacked – the relegation battle was won by his successor Jim Ryan who remained in charge until the end of the following season when he was sacked even though Luton had avoided relegation again.

=== Wimbledon ===
Soon after being sacked as manager of Luton, Harford was recruited by Wimbledon as assistant manager to Bobby Gould, succeeding Don Howe, who had been appointed manager of Queens Park Rangers. The partnership lasted just five months until July 1990, when Gould was sacked from his post, and Harford was promoted from assistant manager to manager for the third time in his career.

In 1990–91, Wimbledon did well to finish seventh in the First Division, and there were high hopes that the club could qualify for European competition or win one of the two domestic cups during the 1991–92 season. Wimbledon made a slow start to the season, and then Harford resigned in October to take up a lucrative offer at Blackburn Rovers. He was briefly replaced by Peter Withe, who lasted just three months before being sacked and replaced by Joe Kinnear. In the same month that Harford left Wimbledon, the former Liverpool manager Kenny Dalglish had been appointed as manager of Second Division Blackburn Rovers who had been out of the top division since 1966. Their wealthy benefactor Jack Walker was determined to get the Ewood Park side into the new Premier League, which was due to start in the 1992–93 season. He offered Harford the position of assistant manager at Blackburn and Harford accepted.

=== Blackburn Rovers ===
==== Success as assistant manager ====
While Harford was assistant manager of Blackburn, he helped Kenny Dalglish in the club's quest for success. In 1992, the club won promotion to the new Premier League via the promotion playoffs. In the new Premier League in 1993, Blackburn finished fourth thanks to a side made up of mostly new players like £3.3 million record-signing striker Alan Shearer, who scored 16 league goals before a serious injury sustained just before the turn of the new year ruled him out for the rest of the season. Blackburn topped the league at several stages that season, but Manchester United eventually finished as champions.

The following season, Blackburn finished runners-up to double winners Manchester United. Still, a consolation for the disappointment came in the form of a UEFA Cup place. For much of the season, it had looked certain that the league title would remain at Old Trafford. Still, an erratic run of form by United in March meant that Blackburn drew level on points in early April (kept off the top only on goal difference), but in the end, United surged to the title.

In 1994–95, Blackburn suffered early exits from the UEFA Cup, FA Cup and League Cup but their league form was excellent. On the final day of the season, they lost 2–1 to Dalglish's old club Liverpool, but their nearest rivals, Manchester United, were unable to beat West Ham United and the English league championship went to Blackburn Rovers for the first time since 1914. It was also the first time in Harford's career that he had been associated with a title-winning side.

A month after the title success, Kenny Dalglish was promoted to Director of football, and the board offered Harford to fill the manager's seat. On arriving at Ewood Park, he had vowed never to make a fourth move from assistant manager to manager but went back on his word and accepted the offer.

==== Frustrating time as manager ====
1995–96 was a frustrating season for Harford and Blackburn. Chris Sutton, Jason Wilcox and Graeme Le Saux missed a lot of games through injury, although Alan Shearer was still brilliant, with 31 Premiership goals. Despite an early exit from the 1995–96 UEFA Champions League, Blackburn improved as the season progressed. Although they never looked like regaining their Premiership title, they were in contention for a UEFA Cup place until the last game of the season but lost out to Arsenal and finished seventh. It wasn't a bad finish, though, considering that Blackburn had been in the bottom half of the Premier League for much of the season. During the summer of 1996, Alan Shearer was sold to Newcastle United for a then world record fee of £15 million, and Harford failed to replace him adequately. Harford stated, "I'm told we need a big name. Engelbert Humperdinck is a big name but it doesn't mean he can play football."

The 1996–97 season also started badly for Blackburn. They failed to win any of their first ten games and were knocked out of the League Cup by Division Two side Stockport. Harford handed in his resignation on 25 October and was replaced temporarily by coach Tony Parkes, who took charge until the end of the season and guided Rovers to 13th in the final table before Roy Hodgson was appointed as permanent manager.

=== West Bromwich Albion ===
In February 1997, Harford was named as West Bromwich Albion's new manager in place of Alan Buckley. Albion were hovering just above the relegation zone in Division One (which had been a familiar pattern since their promotion in 1993), and Harford did much to keep the club clear of relegation. Despite a promising start to the following season, he said that he found it tiring to travel over 100 miles (160 km) from his Berkshire home to the Midlands on an almost daily basis, and in December 1997 moved to Division One rivals Queens Park Rangers. His successor, Denis Smith, claimed that Harford had told him the real reason he decided to leave the club was that an ageing team and a lack of investment from the boardroom meant that the club were "heading for a fall".

=== QPR ===
Queens Park Rangers were struggling in Division One, they had slipped from the Premiership in 1996 after 13 consecutive seasons of top division football. Harford was appointed successor to Stewart Houston and hoped to get the club back into the Premiership. At the end of the 1997–98 season, the Loftus Road club avoided relegation at the expense of Manchester City, Stoke City and Reading but the club's directors and supporters expected more. And after a poor start to the 1998–99 season, Harford was sacked in September and replaced by Gerry Francis.

=== Millwall ===
In the summer of 1999, Harford made a return to football as first-team coach under then Millwall manager Keith Stevens. Millwall had been in Division Two since 1996, and the club's directors were desperate to win promotion. Stevens was young and inexperienced, and by September 2000, the Millwall board had decided they wanted a more experienced manager, so they terminated his contract. Harford was appointed manager temporarily, and it seemed possible he would be given the job permanently. But that fifth promotion from within never happened, and Mark McGhee was given the job instead. Harford remained on the club's coaching staff and was crucial in Millwall's Division Two championship that season which ended a five-year exile from the upper tier of the English league.

In 2001–02, Millwall finished fourth in Division One and qualified for the promotion playoffs. Everyone at the club was hopeful that a second successive promotion could be achieved. However, those hopes were ended in a semi-final defeat by eventual winners Birmingham City.

== Retirement and death ==
In October 2002, Harford was diagnosed with lung cancer and spent the rest of the season away from his job at Millwall receiving treatment for his illness.

Early on the morning of 9 August 2003, Ray Harford died while he was still officially a member of the Millwall coaching staff under Mark McGhee. His funeral was held in All Saints Church, Banstead, Surrey, with many members of the football community in attendance. He was survived by his wife, Maureen, and son Paul. Paul also became a professional footballer and was on the books of Arsenal and Blackburn Rovers, but did not play a senior game for either side. However, he did manage a few senior appearances in subsequent spells with Wigan Athletic and Shrewsbury Town, before a more active career at non-league level.

== Career statistics ==
=== Playing statistics ===
Appearances and goals by club, season and competition
| Club | Season | League | | | FA Cup | | League Cup | | Total | |
| Club | Season | Division | Apps | Goals | Apps | Goals | Apps | Goals | Apps | Goals |
|---|---|---|---|---|---|---|---|---|---|---|
| Charlton Athletic | 1965–66 | Second Division | 3 | 0 | 0 | 0 | 0 | 0 | 3 | 0 |
| Exeter City | 1965–66 | Third Division | 17 | 0 | 0 | 0 | 0 | 0 | 17 | 0 |
| Exeter City | 1966–67 | Fourth Division | 38 | 1 | 1 | 0 | 4 | 2 | 43 | 3 |
| Exeter City | Total | | 55 | 1 | 1 | 0 | 4 | 2 | 60 | 3 |
| Lincoln City | 1967–68 | Fourth Division | 46 | 3 | 1 | 0 | 5 | 0 | 52 | 3 |
| Lincoln City | 1968–69 | Fourth Division | 43 | 3 | 4 | 0 | 2 | 0 | 49 | 3 |
| Lincoln City | 1969–70 | Fourth Division | 28 | 3 | 0 | 0 | 1 | 0 | 29 | 3 |
| Lincoln City | 1970–71 | Fourth Division | 44 | 1 | 5 | 0 | 3 | 0 | 52 | 1 |
| Lincoln City | Total | | 161 | 10 | 10 | 0 | 11 | 0 | 182 | 10 |
| Mansfield Town | 1971–72 | Third Division | 7 | 0 | 0 | 0 | 2 | 0 | 9 | 0 |
| Port Vale | 1971–72 | Third Division | 19 | 1 | 0 | 0 | 0 | 0 | 19 | 1 |
| Port Vale | 1972–73 | Third Division | 1 | 0 | 0 | 0 | 0 | 0 | 1 | 0 |
| Port Vale | Total | | 20 | 1 | 0 | 0 | 0 | 0 | 20 | 1 |
| Colchester United | 1972–73 | Fourth Division | 21 | 1 | 0 | 0 | 0 | 0 | 21 | 1 |
| Colchester United | 1973–74 | Fourth Division | 46 | 1 | 1 | 1 | 1 | 0 | 48 | 2 |
| Colchester United | 1974–75 | Third Division | 41 | 2 | 2 | 0 | 6 | 0 | 49 | 2 |
| Colchester United | Total | | 108 | 4 | 3 | 1 | 7 | 0 | 118 | 5 |
| Career total | | | 354 | 16 | 14 | 1 | 24 | 2 | 392 | 19 |

=== Managerial statistics ===
Managerial record by team and tenure
| Team | From | To | Record | | | | |
| Team | From | To | P | W | D | L | Win % |
|---|---|---|---|---|---|---|---|
| Fulham | 20 April 1984 | 10 June 1986 | 99 | 37 | 16 | 46 | 37.4 |
| Luton Town | 15 June 1987 | 3 January 1990 | 126 | 47 | 34 | 45 | 37.3 |
| Wimbledon | 18 June 1990 | 7 October 1991 | 56 | 20 | 17 | 19 | 35.7 |
| Blackburn Rovers | 25 June 1995 | 25 October 1996 | 64 | 24 | 13 | 27 | 37.5 |
| West Bromwich Albion | 6 February 1997 | 4 December 1997 | 40 | 19 | 7 | 14 | 47.5 |
| Queens Park Rangers | 5 December 1997 | 28 September 1998 | 41 | 5 | 18 | 18 | 12.2 |
| Millwall (caretaker) | 17 September 2000 | 25 September 2000 | 2 | 2 | 0 | 0 | 100.0 |
| Total | | | 428 | 154 | 105 | 169 | 36.0 |

== Honours ==
=== As a player ===
Colchester United

- Football League Fourth Division promotion: 1973–74

Individual

- Colchester United Player of the Year: 1974

=== As a manager ===
Luton Town

- Football League Cup: 1987–88; runner-up: 1988–89
- Full Members' Cup runner-up: 1987–88
