= J. Paul Taylor (physician-scientist) =

American researcher

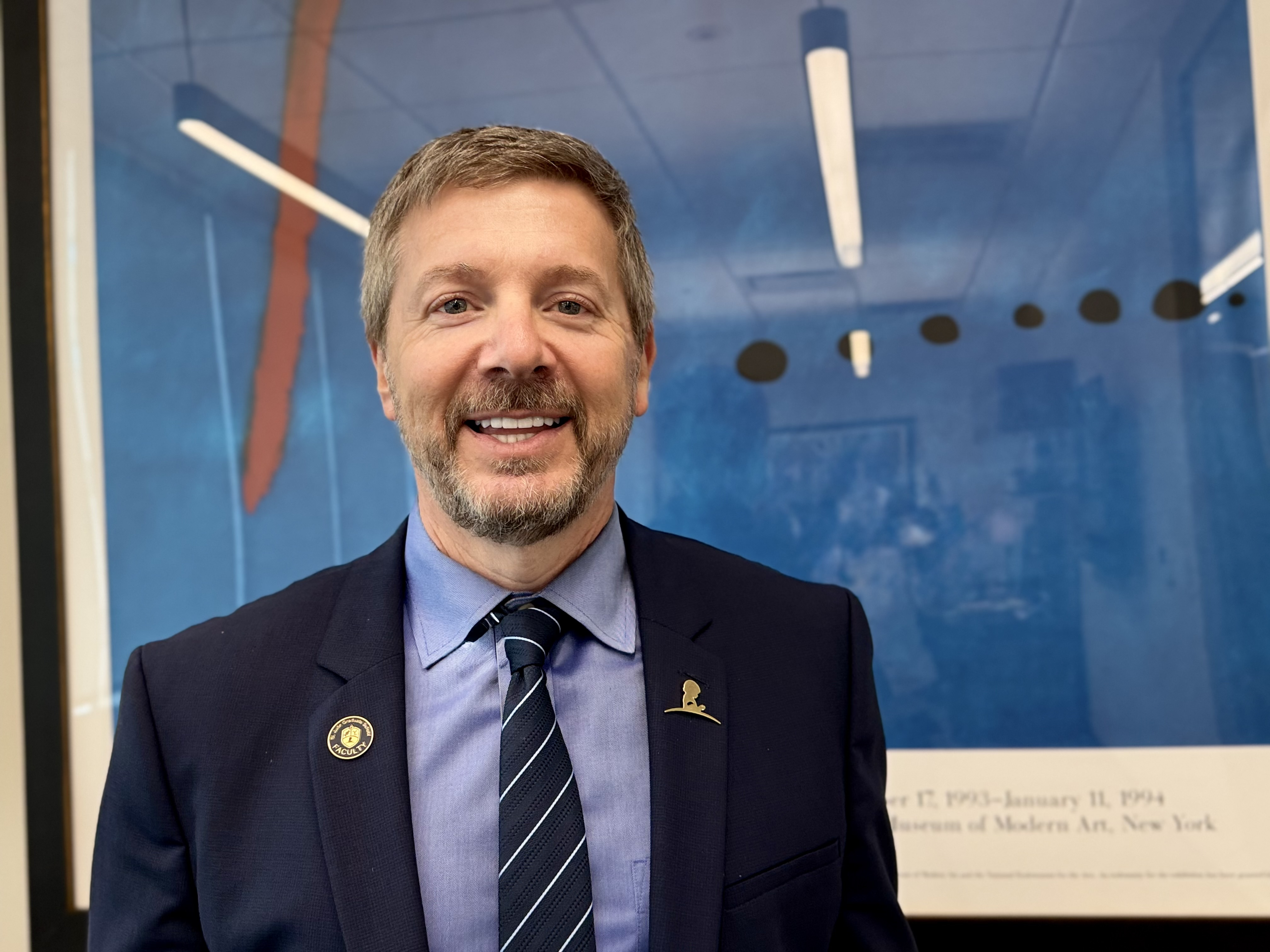
- Taylor in April 2025
- Education: University of California, Davis (BS); Thomas Jefferson University (MD, PhD)
- Scientific career
- Workplaces: National Institute of Neurological Disorders and Stroke; University of Pennsylvania School of Medicine; St. Jude Children's Research Hospital

J. Paul Taylor is an American physician scientist and research hospital director known for his contributions to the fields of neurogenetics, RNA biology, and neurological disease, including the role of biomolecular condensation in neurological diseases such as ALS.

Taylor is Scientific Director and Executive Vice President of St. Jude Children's Research Hospital in Memphis, Tennessee. He holds the Edward F. Barry Endowed Chair in Cell and Molecular Biology and also serves as Chair of the Department of Cell and Molecular Biology and Director of the St. Jude Pediatric Translational Neuroscience Initiative.

He is a fellow of the American Neurological Association and the Association of American Physicians, the winner of the 2020 Norman Saunders International Research Prize, and the winner of the 2020 Potamkin Prize. Taylor was an Investigator of the Howard Hughes Medical Institute from 2015 until becoming St. Jude Scientific Director. He was elected to the National Academy of Medicine in 2025.

== Education ==
Taylor graduated with a Bachelor of Science in Physiology from the University of California, Davis. He obtained his MD and PhD from Jefferson Medical College of Thomas Jefferson University. He completed his medical internship and neurology residency at the University of Pennsylvania School of Medicine, followed by a fellowship in neurogenetics at the National Institute of Neurological Disorders and Stroke in the lab of Kenneth Fischbeck.

== Career ==
Taylor joined the faculty at the University of Pennsylvania School of Medicine in 2004 as Assistant Professor of Neurology, where he established a research program investigating the molecular mechanisms of neurodegenerative disease. In 2008, Taylor moved to St. Jude Children's Research Hospital as Associate Member in the Department of Developmental Neurobiology. In 2014, Taylor became the founding Chair of the Department of Cell and Molecular Biology. In 2015, Taylor was named an Investigator of the Howard Hughes Medical Institute, a position he held until 2022 when he was named Scientific Director and Executive Vice President of St. Jude. Taylor is also the founding director of the St. Jude Pediatric Translational Neuroscience Initiative, a program that leverages the hospital's infrastructure in research and experimental therapeutics to develop cures for childhood neurological diseases.

Taylor's research program at St. Jude focuses on neurogenetics, the biology of RNA and RNA-binding proteins, and mechanisms of neurological disease, with particular interest in the role of biomolecular condensation in diseases such as ALS and frontotemporal dementia. He was named on the Clarivate list of Highly Cited Researchers 2019-2025.

== Selected research papers ==
- Gwon Y, Maxwell BA, Kolaitis RM, Zhang P, Kim HJ, Taylor JP (2021). "Ubiquitination of G3BP1 mediates stress granule disassembly in a context-specific manner". Science. 372 (6549) eabf6548. doi:10.1126/science.abf6548. PMC 8574224. PMID 34739333.
- Maxwell BA, Gwon Y, Mishra A, Peng J, Nakamura H, Zhang K, Kim HJ, Taylor JP (2021). "Ubiquitination is essential for recovery of cellular activities after heat shock". Science. 372 (6549) eabc3593. doi:10.1126/science.abc3593. PMC 8574219. PMID 34739326.
- Freibaum BD, Lu Y, Lopez-Gonzalez R, Kim NC, Almeida S, Lee KH, Badders N, Valentine M, Miller BL, Wong PC, Petrucelli L, Kim HJ, Gao FB, Taylor JP (2015). "GGGGCC repeat expansion in C9orf72 compromises nucleocytoplasmic transport". Nature. 525 (7567): 129–33. Bibcode:2015Natur.525..129F. doi:10.1038/nature14974. PMC 4631399. PMID 26308899.
- Molliex A, Temirov J, Lee J, Coughlin M, Kanagaraj AP, Kim HJ, Mittag T, Taylor JP (2015). "Phase separation by low complexity domains promotes stress granule assembly and drives pathological fibrillization". Cell. 163 (1): 123–33. doi:10.1016/j.cell.2015.09.015. PMC 5149108. PMID 26406374.
- Kim HJ, Kim NC, Wang YD, Scarborough EA, Moore J, Diaz Z, MacLea KS, Freibaum B, Li S, Molliex A, Kanagaraj AP, Carter R, Boylan KB, Wojtas AM, Rademakers R, Pinkus JL, Greenberg SA, Trojanowski JQ, Traynor BJ, Smith BN, Topp S, Gkazi AS, Miller J, Shaw CE, Kottlors M, Kirschner J, Pestronk A, Li YR, Ford AF, Gitler AD, Benatar M, King OD, Kimonis VE, Ross ED, Weihl CC, Shorter J, Taylor JP (2013). "Mutations in prion-like domains in hnRNPA2B1 and hnRNPA1 cause multisystem proteinopathy and ALS". Nature. 495 (7442): 467–73. Bibcode:2013Natur.495..467K. doi:10.1038/nature11922. PMC 3756911. PMID 23455423.
- Pandey UB, Nie Z, Batlevi Y, McCray BA, Ritson GP, Nedelsky NB, Schwartz SL, DiProspero NA, Knight MA, Schuldiner O, Padmanabhan R, Hild M, Berry DL, Garza D, Hubbert CC, Yao TP, Baehrecke EH, Taylor JP (2007). "HDAC6 rescues neurodegeneration and provides an essential link between autophagy and the UPS". Nature. 447 (7146): 859–63. Bibcode:2007Natur.447..860P. doi:10.1038/nature05853. PMID 17568747. S2CID 4365061.
