= Will Dixon =

English footballer (born 1950)

Personal information
- Full name: Wilfred Edward Dixon
- Date of birth: 20 February 1950 (age 76)
- Place of birth: Wood Green, England
- Height: 5 ft 8 in (1.73 m)
- Position: Right-back

Youth career
- Arsenal

Senior career*
| Years | Team | Apps | (Gls) |
| 1968–1969 | Arsenal | 0 | (0) |
| 1969–1973 | Reading | 153 | (0) |
| 1973 | Colchester United | 0 | (0) |
| 1973–1977 | Swindon Town | 140 | (10) |
| 1977–1980 | Aldershot | 120 | (6) |
- Woking
| Total | | 413 | (16) |
- * Club domestic league appearances and goals

Wilfred Edward Dixon (born 20 February 1950) is an English former professional footballer who played as a right-back in the Football League for Reading, Swindon Town and Aldershot.

== Career ==
Born in Wood Green, Dixon was a product of the Arsenal youth system. Never appearing for the Gunners, he signed initially on a two-month loan with Reading before signing on a permanent basis in July 1969. Here, he was a regular first-team member and recorded one goal in 171 appearances in all competitions before falling out of favour in 1973.

Dixon briefly moved to Colchester United in 1973, but failed to make an appearance for the Essex club. He signed for Swindon Town in September 1973 but didn't make his debut for the club until 1 January 1974 in a 3–1 win over Preston North End. He went on to make 162 appearances in all competitions and scored 13 goals prior to his release at the end of the 1976–77 season.

After Swindon, Dixon moved to Aldershot where he made 120 league appearances and scored six goals, before moving into non-League football with Woking in 1980.
