= Phil Thomas (footballer) =

English footballer

Personal information
- Full name: Philip Leslie Thomas
- Date of birth: 14 December 1952
- Place of birth: Sherborne, England
- Date of death: August 1998 (aged 45–46)
- Place of death: Poole, England
- Height: 5 ft 10 in (1.78 m)
- Position: Midfielder

Youth career
- Bournemouth

Senior career*
Years	Team	Apps	(Gls)
1971–1972	Bournemouth	0	(0)
1972–1976	Colchester United	108	(8)
Total		108	(8)
- * Club domestic league appearances and goals

Philip Leslie Thomas (14 December 1952 – August 1998) was an English footballer who played as a midfielder in the Football League for Colchester United.

== Career ==
Born in Sherborne, Thomas began his career with Bournemouth, signing a professional deal with the club in July 1971 following his apprenticeship. He failed to break into the first team with the club and was subsequently signed by Colchester United manager Dick Graham in the summer of 1972.

Thomas made his Colchester debut in the League Cup against Gillingham on 16 August 1972, a 1–0 defeat. After Graham's resignation, Thomas continued to be a regular fixture in the first-team under new manager Jim Smith, helping his side gain promotion to the Third Division in the 1973–74 season, featuring mainly on the wing. He scored his first goal on 10 November 1972 in a 3–1 win at Layer Road over Southport.

Between 1972 and 1975, Thomas amassed 108 league appearances and scored eight goals, but he was forced to retire from the game in January 1976 at the age of 23 because of a recurring knee injury. He played his last professional game on 13 December 1975 in a 1–1 away draw with Wrexham, coming on as substitute for Lindsay Smith.

Following his retirement, Thomas became a pub landlord in Norwich and then in Ipswich before returning to his native Dorset to become a locksmith in the Poole area. He was granted a testimonial by Colchester United against Ipswich Town in May 1977. He died at the age of 46 in August 1998.
