= Alex Smith (footballer, born 1947) =

English footballer

Personal information
- Date of birth: 11 May 1947 (age 79)
- Place of birth: Thornhill, West Yorkshire, England
- Height: 5 ft 11 in (1.80 m)
- Position: Full back

Youth career
- Ossett Albion

Senior career*
Years	Team	Apps	(Gls)
1964–1968	Bradford City	93	(2)
1968–1970	Huddersfield Town	29	(0)
1970–1973	Southend United	130	(1)
1973–1975	Colchester United	51	(1)
1975–1976	Halifax Town	47	(1)
- * Club domestic league appearances and goals

Alexander Smith (born 11 May 1947) is a former professional footballer, who played for Ossett Albion, Bradford City, Huddersfield Town, Southend United, Colchester United and Halifax Town.
