= Colwyn Rowe =

English footballer and coach

Personal information
- Full name: Colwyn Roger Rowe
- Date of birth: 22 March 1956 (age 70)
- Place of birth: Ipswich, England
- Position: Winger

Youth career
- Colchester United

Senior career*
Years	Team	Apps	(Gls)
1973–1975	Colchester United	12	(2)
1975–1976	Chelmsford City		

Managerial career
- Lowestoft Town
- 1980: Ipswich Wanderers
- 2003–2004: Woodbridge Town
- 2004: Heybridge Swifts
- 2004–2006: Jordan U17
- 2006–2008: Botswana
- 2008: Al Ahly Youth
- 2011–2012: Saint Vincent and the Grenadines
- * Club domestic league appearances and goals

Colwyn Roger Rowe (born 22 March 1956) is an English football coach and former professional player.

== Playing career ==
Rowe began his professional career in 1973 with Colchester United, before signing with Chelmsford City in 1975.

== Coaching career ==
After retiring as a professional player, Rowe began work as a professional football coach. He was a manager of several semi-professional teams in England, including Lowestoft Town, Ipswich Wanderers, Woodbridge Town, and Heybridge Swifts. Rowe was responsible for setting up the PASE scheme, a football academy for aspiring footballers to train full-time alongside education with Ipswich Wanderers and also Woodbridge Town. In 2004 Rowe ran a FA course for coaches from war-torn Iraq. In 2005, he helped to set up the youth programme of the Jordan national side. He became the manager of the Botswana national team in August 2006, before leaving in June 2008. In June 2008 he became the technical director and football manager of the Al Ahly youth section.

He was manager of Saint Vincent and the Grenadines from February 2011 to April 2012.

== Personal life ==
Rowe is married and has two sons, Jonathan and James.
