= Barry Dominey =

English footballer

Personal information
- Full name: Barry William Dominey
- Date of birth: 21 October 1955
- Place of birth: Edmonton, London, England
- Date of death: 22 March 2005 (aged 49)
- Height: 6 ft 0 in (1.83 m)
- Position: Defender

Senior career*
Years	Team	Apps	(Gls)
1974–1977	Colchester United	71	(3)
- Yeovil Town
- Dorchester Town
Total		71	(3)
- * Club domestic league appearances and goals

Barry William Dominey (21 October 1955 – 22 March 2005) was an English footballer who played as a defender in the Football League for Colchester United. Considered a good prospect as a teenager, his career stuttered at an early age and he quickly slipped out of the Football League and played for Yeovil Town and Dorchester Town.

== Career ==
Dominey, born in Edmonton, London, joined Colchester United from Enfield WMC, making his U's and Football League debut on 16 April 1974 during a 0–0 away draw with Brentford, coming on as a substitute for Paul Taylor. He scored his first Colchester goal in a 1–0 League Cup fourth round replay at The Dell against Southampton which proved to be the crucial winning goal, taking the U's through to the quarter-finals of the competition. Dominey would go on to score three league goals in 71 appearances for the club. He made his final appearance in a Colchester shirt on 21 January 1977 in a 1–0 home defeat to Cambridge United. He would later play for Yeovil Town and Dorchester Town. Barry Dominey died aged 49 on 22 March 2005.
