= Barry Dyson =

English footballer

Personal information
- Full name: John Barry Dyson
- Date of birth: 6 September 1942
- Place of birth: Oldham, England
- Date of death: 26 February 1995 (aged 52)
- Place of death: Layer de la Haye, England
- Height: 5 ft 9 1/2 in (1.77 m)
- Position: Striker

Youth career
- 1959–1960: Bury

Senior career*
| Years | Team | Apps | (Gls) |
| 1960–1962 | Bury | 0 | (0) |
| 1962–1966 | Tranmere Rovers | 174 | (99 (Note: Dyson's precise number of league goals for Tranmere is uncertain. Watford Football Club historian Trefor Jones states that he scored 99 goals in his book, whilst published statistician Neil Brown quotes 100 goals in his online records.)) |
| 1966–1968 | Crystal Palace | 34 | (9) |
| 1968 | Watford | 38 | (19) |
| 1968–1973 | Orient | 160 | (28) |
| 1973–1975 | Colchester United | 42 | (6) |
| 1975 | → Chelmsford City (loan) | | |
- * Club domestic league appearances and goals

John Barry Dyson (6 September 1942 – 26 February 1995; better known as Barry Dyson) was an English association footballer who played as a centre forward. He played in the Football League for Bury, Tranmere Rovers, Crystal Palace, Watford, Orient and Colchester United, as well as a brief spell on loan at non-league Chelmsford City.

== Career ==
Born in Oldham, Lancashire, Dyson started his career as a 16-year-old amateur at Bury in August 1959, turning professional shortly after his 18th birthday. After failing to make a league appearance at Gigg Lane, Dyson moved to Tranmere Rovers in 1962. During his time there, he maintained a strong scoring rate in his 174 league appearances. His form attracted the interest of Crystal Palace, who paid Tranmere £15,000 for his services. Dyson scored nine goals from 34 appearances over the next 18 months, before transferring to Watford for £9,000 in January 1968, in the search of more regular first-team football.

Dyson's time at Watford was one of contrasts. His impact at Watford was dramatic; he scored 15 goals in Watford's 20 remaining fixtures of the 1967–68 season, including 13 goals in his first 13 starts. Despite having played fewer than half of Watford's league games, he finished the season as their top scorer. However, the sale of winger Tony Currie to Sheffield United in July 1968 impacted on the number of chances the team created the following season. Additionally, the purchase of fellow striker Barry Endean prompted manager Ken Furphy to use Dyson in a deeper role. Consequently, he could only manage 4 goals from his 20 appearances in 1968–69. With the agreement of Furphy, Dyson was allowed to transfer to Orient in December 1968, for £1,000 less than Watford initially paid for him.

Although Dyson was the first-choice striker at Orient, he was unable to regain the strike rate he had previously maintained, scoring 28 goals in 160 league games. He joined Colchester United in 1973, for whom he scored 6 goals before finishing his career with a loan spell at Chelmsford City.

Dyson suffered brain damage as a result of a heart attack and died shortly after.
