= Bobby Mills (footballer, born 1955) =

English footballer

Personal information
- Full name: Robert Brian Mills
- Date of birth: 16 March 1955 (age 71)
- Place of birth: Edmonton, London, England
- Position: Midfielder

Youth career
- Colchester United

Senior career*
Years	Team	Apps	(Gls)
1971–1974	Colchester United	26	(0)
- Chelmsford City
Total		26	(0)
- * Club domestic league appearances and goals

Robert Brian Mills (born 16 March 1955) is an English former footballer who played in the Football League as a midfielder for Colchester United.

== Career ==
Born in Edmonton, London, Mills joined Colchester United as an apprentice, breaking into the first-team at the age of 16 by making his debut on 4 March 1972 in a 2–0 win against Brentford at Griffin Park. Mills made 26 appearances for Colchester between 1972 and 1974, making his final appearance on 27 April 1974 in a 1–1 draw with Bradford City at Valley Parade before joining Chelmsford City nominally in the summer of 1974.
