= Paul Graham Taylor =

Scholar of international relations

- Occupation: Professor Emeritus of International Relations

Academic work
- Discipline: International Relations
- Institutions: London School of Economics and Political Science

Paul Graham Taylor is Professor Emeritus of International Relations at the London School of Economics and Political Science. His main areas of expertise are European integration and international organisations. From 2001 to 2004, he was Director of the European Institute at the same institution.

== Publications ==
- Taylor, P. (2010). The careless state: Wealth and welfare in Britain today. Bloomsbury.
- Taylor, P. (2008). The end of European integration: Anti-Europeanism examined. Routledge.
- Taylor, P. (2005). International organization in the age of globalization. Continuum.
- Taylor, P. (1996). The European Union in the 1990s. Oxford University Press.
- Taylor, P. (1993). Taylor, Paul (1993) International organization in the modern world: the regional and the global pattern. Pinter.
- Taylor, P. (1983). The limits of European integration. Croom Helm.
