= Stuart Morgan =

Welsh footballer and manager

Personal information
- Full name: Stuart Edward Morgan
- Date of birth: 23 September 1949 (age 77)
- Place of birth: Swansea, Wales
- Position: Defender

Youth career
- –: West Ham United

Senior career*
Years	Team	Apps	(Gls)
1967–1969	West Ham United	0	(0)
1969	→ Torquay United (loan)	14	(0)
1969–1972	Reading	46	(1)
1972–1975	Colchester United	81	(10)
1975–1978	AFC Bournemouth	81	(5)

Managerial career
- 1978–1983: Weymouth
- 1985–1987: Torquay United
- 1987–1989: Weymouth
- 1993–1999: Dorchester Town
- * Club domestic league appearances and goals

Stuart Edward Morgan (born 23 September 1949 in Swansea) is a Welsh former professional footballer and football manager. A central defender, he made 222 appearances in the Football League playing for Torquay United, Reading, Colchester United and AFC Bournemouth. As manager, he took charge of Torquay United in the Football League and Weymouth (twice) and Dorchester Town in non-League football.

== Career ==
Morgan joined West Ham United as a junior, turning professional in March 1967. However, he was never to make the West Ham first team. He joined Torquay United on loan in February 1969, making his league debut on 15 February in a 2–1 win at home to Watford. He remained at Plainmoor until the end of the season, playing 14 league games.

In November 1969, Morgan moved to Reading where he played 46 times before moving to Colchester United in August 1972. He scored twelve times in 81 league games for Colchester, captaining them to promotion under manager Jim Smith in 1974 before moving to AFC Bournemouth in March 1975.

He was appointed manager of Weymouth in November 1978, guiding them to second place in the Alliance Premier League in 1979–80. He left Weymouth in November 1983, returning to Bournemouth as part of Harry Redknapp's coaching staff, where he remained until September 1985 when Morgan was appointed as manager of Torquay United. Torquay finished bottom of Division Four that season, the last before automatic relegation to the Conference would begin. The next season Torquay struggled again and only survived on the last day of the season, at Lincoln City's expense, thanks to a late equaliser against Crewe Alexandra from Paul Dobson in injury time added after Torquay defender Jim McNichol had been bitten by a police dog.

Morgan resigned in May 1987 and the following month began his second spell as manager of Weymouth. He took 'The Terras' to second place in the league before a flooded Wessex Stadium pitch meant that they did not play for six weeks, thus losing their momentum. Morgan then joined forces with Harry Redknapp again, as Chief Scout of Bournemouth, where they enjoyed a lot of success.

In August 1993 he was appointed as manager of Dorchester Town, where he took 'The Magpies' to their highest ever Southern Premier League finish, but was sacked in September 1999 after a 3–0 defeat in the FA Cup qualifying rounds to a Taunton Town side that contained manager Russell Musker and four players, Tom Kelly, Mark Loram, Chris Myers, and Darren Cann, all of whom he had signed while manager of Torquay.

He later worked as a scout for West Ham United and Portsmouth and is currently a full-time scout for Tottenham Hotspur Football Club.
