= Paul Aimson =

English footballer

Personal information
- Full name: Paul Edward Aimson
- Date of birth: 3 August 1943
- Place of birth: Prestbury, England
- Date of death: 9 January 2008 (aged 64)
- Place of death: Christchurch, England
- Height: 5 ft 11 in (1.80 m)
- Position: Forward

Youth career
- Manchester City

Senior career*
Years	Team	Apps	(Gls)
1960–1964	Manchester City	16	(4)
1964–1966	York City	77	(43)
1966–1967	Bury	31	(11)
1967–1968	Bradford City	23	(11)
1968–1969	Huddersfield Town	38	(13)
1969–1973	York City	142	(55)
1973	AFC Bournemouth	9	(2)
1973–1974	Colchester United	4	(2)
Total		340	(141)
- * Club domestic league appearances and goals

Paul Edward Aimson (3 August 1943 – 9 January 2008) was an English footballer who played as a forward in the Football League, most notably for York City, where he scored 113 goals in 249 games in all competitions during two spells with the club.

Aimson played also as a striker for Manchester City, Bury, Bradford City, Huddersfield Town, AFC Bournemouth and Colchester United between 1961 and 1974.

== Career ==
Born in Prestbury, Aimson began his career with Manchester City, making his debut at centre-forward at the age of 18 against Blackburn Rovers. The game ended in a 4–1 defeat for City on 9 December 1961. He retrained as a striker over the course of the next year, and in the 1963–64 season scored six goals in 17 appearances in all competitions.

He signed for York City in 1964 for a £1,000 fee, scoring 26 goals in his first season, helping the club win promotion to the Third Division. However, York were relegated in last place the following season. Aimson left the club to join Bury for £10,000 in 1966, with a record of 43 goals in 77 league games.

Aimson scored 11 league goals in 31 games for Bury, and the following season moved to Bradford City for £4,000, scoring 11 goals in 23 games. He then transferred to Huddersfield Town for £20,000, where he scored 13 goals in 38 games before moving back to York City for a fee of £8,000.

In the 1970–71 season, he aided York to another promotion to the Third Division, forming a solid partnership with Phil Boyer and scoring 26 goals. In the same season, Aimson scored a vital goal to earn York an FA Cup third round replay with Southampton. He also scored York's fastest ever goal in 9.5 seconds in a match against Torquay United.

During his second stint at York, Aimson scored 55 goals in 142 league appearances. He was top scorer for the club in four of his six campaigns in both spells, scoring a total of 113 goals in 249 games. His tally included five hat-tricks, including a perfect hat-trick, scoring with his left foot, right food and head in a 4–1 victory over Hull City in 1965.

In March 1973 he signed for AFC Bournemouth for £12,000. He made only nine appearances and scored two goals for Bournemouth, before moving to Colchester United in August 1973 for a then club record of £11,000. Injury cut his career short, and Aimson retired from playing in 1974 having played just four games and scoring two goals for the U's.

== Later life ==
After requiring a second operation on his problematic knee, Aimson was actually given his last rites as complications from the surgery arose, but he survived, retiring to become a sales rep and later a physical recreation officer for Dorset Probation Service. Aimson received a benefit match from both Colchester and Bury in 1975, with Colchester taking on Norwich City in a promotion celebration friendly for the player, and Bury facing an all-star XI containing footballing greats from the north-west of England.

His grandson Will Aimson, followed in his footsteps as a professional footballer, making his debut for Eastleigh F.C. in 2012.

== Death ==
Aimson died at the age of 64 of a heart attack in hospital near his home in Christchurch on 9 January 2008.
