= Fred Binney =

English footballer

Personal information
- Full name: Frederick Edward Binney
- Date of birth: 12 August 1946 (age 80)
- Place of birth: Plymouth, England
- Position: Forward

Senior career*
Years	Team	Apps	(Gls)
1966–1970	Torquay United	34	(11)
1969	→ Exeter City (loan)	17	(11)
1970–1974	Exeter City	160	(79)
1974–1977	Brighton & Hove Albion	70	(35)
1977	St. Louis Stars	18	(9)
1977–1980	Plymouth Argyle	71	(39)
1980–1982	Hereford United	27	(6)
Total		397	(190)
- * Club domestic league appearances and goals

Frederick Edward Binney (born 12 August 1946) is an English former professional footballer who played in the Football League for Torquay United, Exeter City, Brighton & Hove Albion, Plymouth Argyle and Hereford United, and in the North American Soccer League for the St. Louis Stars.

== Early career ==
Binney was raised in the Barbican area of Plymouth. He was a prolific goalscorer in junior football whilst playing for CM Department juniors and was signed by South Western League side Launceston. He became an apprentice at Devonport Dockyard and whilst continuing to play for Launceston, also played for John Conway in the Devon Wednesday League. During the early years in the dockyard Fred was also involved in the music scene in Plymouth with the Hoe Nuts a very popular local group. It was playing for John Conway that Binney was spotted by Don Mills, by now acting as a scout for Torquay United.

He signed for Torquay as an amateur, before turning professional in October 1966. Whilst a regular scorer for Torquay's reserve side, which played in the Western League, the form of Robin Stubbs meant that Binney's debut would have to wait. It finally came in September 1967, a 1–1 draw away to Grimsby Town, but Binney could not gain a regular place in the side and was loaned to Exeter City in February 1969, scoring 11 goals in 17 league games.

The following season Binney was still not a regular in the Torquay side and in March 1970, after scoring 10 goals in 34 league games for the Gulls, he moved to Exeter City for a fee of £35,000. In 1972–73, Binney scored 28 league goals for Exeter, making him the joint-top goalscorer for the season, alongside Pop Robson of West Ham United. The following season, Binney was voted the PFA Division Four Player of the Year as he scored another 25 times.

Unsurprisingly he was noticed by a number of higher-level teams, and in May 1974 was signed by Brian Clough for Brighton & Hove Albion for a fee of £25,000 with John Templeman and Lammie Robertson moving to Exeter in exchange. He had scored 90 goals in 177 league appearances for the Grecians. His second season at the Goldstone Ground was his most successful, Binney scoring 23 league goals as Brighton narrowly missed out on promotion to Division Two.

== Big move ==
In 1977, after 35 league goals in just 70 games and after helping Brighton to promotion in his final season, he moved to the United States, playing for St. Louis Stars in the NASL; at around this time he also played alongside players like Pelé in New York where he powered a header in front of 68,000 people, before signing for Plymouth Argyle on a free transfer in October 1977.

His first season with his hometown club was a struggle, both for the team as it battled against being relegated for the second successive season, and for Binney who initially could not hold down his place in the first team.

The following season saw a turn around in Binney's fortunes, 28 goals resulting in the Plymouth Player of the Year award. However, Binney suddenly fell from favour at Plymouth, not fitting in with new manager Bobby Saxton's plans for Argyle, and in January 1980, after 42 goals in 81 appearances, Binney was transferred to Hereford United for £37,000.

== Coaching ==
At Hereford he subsequently qualified as a coach and was appointed assistant manager to Frank Lord. In 1982 Lord left for Malaysia and Binney soon followed, working as coach to the Malaysia national team before returning to Devon in 1985 as assistant manager to Colin Appleton at Exeter City. When Appleton was sacked in December 1987, Binney also left becoming Recreation Officer at Plymouth University where he later became president and coach of the University of Plymouth football club (UPFC).

Fred's eldest son, Adam, followed him into football coaching in 2004 as manager of the Longbrooke Football Club in Exeter.
