= Paul Taylor (footballer, born 1949) =

English footballer (born 1949)

Personal information
- Date of birth: 3 December 1949 (age 76)
- Place of birth: Sheffield, England
- Position: Midfielder

Youth career
- 1969–1971: Sheffield Wednesday

Senior career*
| Years | Team | Apps | (Gls) |
| 1971–1973 | Sheffield Wednesday | 6 | (0) |
| 1973–1974 | York City | 4 | (0) |
| 1974 | → Hereford United (loan) | 1 | (0) |
| 1974 | → Colchester United (loan) | 9 | (0) |
| 1974–1977 | Southport | 95 | (16) |
- Los Angeles Skyhawks
- Columbus Magic

Managerial career
- 1987–1988: Gillingham
- 1990: Walsall
- * Club domestic league appearances and goals

Paul Taylor (born 3 December 1949) is a former football player and manager. For a number of years he held the position of Director of Football for Walsall.

== Playing career ==
Born in Sheffield, England, Taylor began his playing career with his hometown team, Sheffield Wednesday, turning professional in 1971, but only made six first-team appearances before being sold to York City in 1973. He again failed to establish himself as a regular at Bootham Crescent and was loaned out to Hereford United and Colchester United. In 1974, he was sold to Southport, where he finally established himself as a first-team regular, making over 100 appearances in total.

In 1977 Taylor left England to play in the USA.

== Managerial career ==
In 1979 Taylor was appointed Head Coach of Columbus Magic, a position he held until the club folded after the 1980 season.

In 1981, he returned to England as assistant manager of Gillingham after the appointment as manager of Keith Peacock, with whom he had worked in America. He remained in this role until Peacock was sacked in December 1987, whereupon he was promoted to manager. His reign was unsuccessful, however, and he was himself sacked less than a year later.

After leaving Priestfield Stadium, Taylor joined Walsall, where he served as coach and assistant manager and also had a very brief spell as manager. In 1994, he became Director of Football.
