= Bobby Svarc =

English footballer

Personal information
- Full name: Robert Louis Svarc
- Date of birth: 8 February 1946 (age 80)
- Place of birth: Leicester, England
- Height: 5 ft 7 in (1.70 m)
- Position: Forward

Youth career
- Leicester City

Senior career*
Years	Team	Apps	(Gls)
1964–1968	Leicester City	13	(2)
1968–1971	Lincoln City	45	(16)
1970–1971	→ Barrow (loan)	15	(3)
1971–1972	Boston United	28	(21)
1972–1975	Colchester United	116	(59)
1975–1978	Blackburn Rovers	50	(16)
1977	→ Watford (loan)	1	(0)
Total		268	(117)
- * Club domestic league appearances and goals

Robert Louis "Bobby" Svarc (born 8 February 1946) is an English former professional footballer who played as a forward.

== Career ==
Svarc, born in Leicester, England, began his career at Leicester City, making 13 appearances, scoring two goals before moving to Lincoln City in 1968. He scored 16 goals in 45 appearances, and during this time scored 3 goals in 15 appearances on loan at Barrow. Svarc signed for non-league Boston United for £2,000 in 1971, and it seemed that his days as full professional were over. However, when his manager Jim Smith took over the reins at Colchester United, he insisted that he bring with him his star player for a transfer fee of £6,000. At Boston, he had scored 21 goals in 28 matches. Unfortunately, his first season at Colchester was marred by injury, but he soon became a crowd favourite there and their leading scorer. After the most consistently successful time of his career, Svarc followed Smith again, this time to Blackburn Rovers in 1975, becoming Rovers' top scorer in the 1976–77 season. He scored some great goals and probably would have got more but for a knee injury which curtailed his playing days. He also made a single appearance for Watford

Svarc's playing style depended on close control, quick turns, and sharp shooting. Not particularly tall, he was nevertheless a good header of the ball.

== Outside football ==
After retiring from football, he set up his own burglar alarm business in Blackburn. Svarc is mentioned in the Half Man Half Biscuit song "Fear My Wraith" on the 1995 album Some Call It Godcore.
