= Lindsay Smith (English footballer) =

English footballer

Personal information
- Full name: Lindsay James Smith
- Date of birth: 18 September 1954 (age 72)
- Place of birth: Westminster, England
- Height: 5 ft 11 in (1.80 m)
- Position: Central defender

Senior career*
Years	Team	Apps	(Gls)
1970–1978	Colchester United	211	(16)
1977	→ Charlton Athletic (loan)	1	(0)
1978	→ Millwall (loan)	5	(0)
1978–1982	Cambridge United	174	(7)
1981–1982	→ Lincoln City (loan)	5	(0)
1982–1984	Plymouth Argyle	76	(5)
1984–1986	Millwall	55	(5)
1986–1989	Cambridge United	102	(16)
1989–1990	Bury Town	?	(?)
Total		629	(49)
- * Club domestic league appearances and goals

Lindsay James Smith (born 18 September 1954), is an English former professional footballer who played as a central defender in the English Football League.

== Career ==
Born in Westminster, Smith began his career at Colchester United. He made his debut against Grimsby Town at the age of 16 years 214 days on 20 April 1971, becoming Colchester's youngest player to appear in the league, a record that stood until 2019. He went on to make 211 league appearances for Colchester, being named in the PFA Team of the Year for 1976–77 whilst with the U's. He also had loan spells at Charlton Athletic and Millwall. He was signed by Cambridge United in 1978 and where he made 174 league appearances. He was loaned out to Lincoln City during this time. He moved to Plymouth Argyle in 1982 and then to Millwall in 1984, before returning to Cambridge in 1986. He later made appearances for Bury Town.

Smith had an unusual skill-set for someone who played most of his career as a defender. Originally a spindly teenager, he was known for his dribbling skills, often coming on as substitute on the left wing. He was then tried as a midfielder and then as an overlapping left back. However, as his body matured, he became strong in the air and he was used by Colchester as a central defender, and occasionally even as a target man up front. His occasional forays up the left wing from his position in central defence caught many teams by surprise.

== Honours ==
Cambridge United

- Football League Third Division runner-up: 1977–78

Individual

- PFA Team of the Year: 1976–77
