= 1976–77 Colchester United F.C. season =

Colchester United
1976–77 season
- Chairman: Jack Rippingale
- Manager: Bobby Roberts
- Stadium: Layer Road
- Fourth Division: 3rd (promoted)
- FA Cup: 4th round (eliminated by Derby County)
- League Cup: 1st round (eliminated by Millwall)
- Top goalscorer: League: Bobby Gough (17); All: Colin Garwood (24)
- Highest home attendance: 14,030 v Derby County, 29 January 1977
- Lowest home attendance: 2,489 v Halifax Town, 24 August 1976
- Average home league attendance: 4,944
- Biggest win: 5–0 v Newport County, 1 January 1977
- Biggest defeat: 0–2 v Cambridge United, 21 August 1976 v Scunthorpe United, 23 October 1976 v Darlington, 7 May 1977
Home colours

The 1976–77 season was Colchester United's 35th season in their history and first season back in fourth tier of English football, the Fourth Division following relegation the previous season. Alongside competing in the Fourth Division, the club also participated in the FA Cup and the League Cup.

Colchester bounced back to the Third Division at the first attempt under Bobby Roberts with a largely unchanged team from the previous season. He led them to a third-place finish in the league, while in the FA Cup, Colchester took First Division Derby County to a replay in the fourth round. In the League Cup, it took Second Division Millwall three attempts to dispatch the U's in a replay following the initial two legs.

== Season overview ==
Colchester made an instant return to the Third Division after the board kept the faith in manager Bobby Roberts. The season began strongly with twelve successive home victories. Despite a first round League Cup defeat to Millwall, an impressive FA Cup run saw the U's lose out in the fourth round to First Division Derby County in a replay at the Baseball Ground. Over 14,000 fans had seen Colin Garwood equalise in the seventh minute of injury time in the first match at Layer Road.

A settled side aided Colchester's progress across the season. Eight players played over 40 of the 46 league games. The two favoured forwards of Bobby Gough and Colin Garwood registered 17 and 16 goals respectively, while centre-half Steve Dowman scored twelve goals in his debut season. Colchester were promoted in third position behind only Cambridge United and Exeter City.

== Players ==
As of match played 14 May 1977.

Name	Position	Nationality	Place of birth	Date of birth	Apps	Goals	Signed from	Date signed	Fee
Goalkeepers
Mike Walker	GK	(Wales)	Colwyn Bay	28 November 1945 (aged 30)	149	0	(England) Watford	July 1973	£4,000
Defenders
Micky Cook	FB	(England)	Enfield	9 April 1951 (aged 25)	289	10	(England) Orient	1 March 1969	Free transfer
Steve Dowman	CB	(England)	Ilford	15 April 1958 (aged 18)	0	0	Apprentice	24 August 1976 (Note: Date of signing refers to the date of the player's first game for the club)	Free transfer
Mick Packer	FB	(England)	Willesden	20 April 1950 (aged 26)	120	4	(England) Watford	July 1973	Free transfer
Lindsay Smith	CB	(England)	Enfield	18 September 1954 (aged 21)	183	12	Apprentice	20 April 1971	Free transfer
Johnny Williams	FB	(England)	Tottenham	26 March 1947 (aged 29)	39	0	(England) Watford	June 1976	Undisclosed
Midfielders
Ray Bunkell	MF	(England)	Edmonton	18 September 1949 (aged 26)	85	5	(England) Swindon Town	December 1973	Part exchange
Paul Dyer	MF	(England)	Leicester	24 January 1953 (aged 23)	40	2	(England) Notts County	Summer 1975	Undisclosed
Steve Foley	MF	(England)	Clacton-on-Sea	21 June 1953 (aged 22)	139	29	Apprentice	July 1969	Free transfer
Steve Leslie	MF	(England)	Hornsey	4 September 1952 (aged 23)	187	34	Apprentice	20 April 1971	Free transfer
Forwards
Ian Allinson	WG	(England)	Hitchin	1 October 1957 (aged 18)	6	0	Apprentice	Summer 1974	Free transfer
John Froggatt	FW	(England)	Stanton Hill	13 December 1945 (aged 30)	98	23	(England) Boston United	Summer 1974	£6,000
Colin Garwood	FW	(England)	Heacham	29 June 1949 (aged 26)	15	2	(England) Huddersfield Town	February 1976	£4,000
Bobby Gough	FW	(England)	Ladywood	20 July 1949 (aged 26)	22	5	(England) Southport	January 1976	£7,000

== Transfers ==
=== In ===
Date	Position	Nationality	Name	From	Fee	Ref.
24 August 1976	CB	(England)	Steve Dowman	Apprentice	Free transfer	(Note: Date of signing refers to the date of the player's first game for the club)

- Total spending: ▼ ~ £0

=== Out ===
Date	Position	Nationality	Name	To	Fee	Ref.
End of season	CB	(England)	Barry Dominey	(England) Yeovil Town	Released	
End of season	CB	(England)	Derek Harrison	(England) Salisbury City	Released	
End of season	WG	(England)	Terry Anderson	Free agent	Released	
August 1976	GK	(England)	Lee Smelt	Margate	Free transfer	
23 November 1976	FB	(England)	Stewart Bright	Chelmsford City	Free transfer	

- Total incoming: ▲ ~ £0

=== Loans in ===
Date	Position	Nationality	Name	From	End date	Ref.
19 February 1977	GK	(England)	Glenn Ellis	(England) Ipswich Town	22 February 1977	(Note: Loan start and end dates refer to the date of the player's first and final games for the club)

== Match details ==
=== Fourth Division ===
==== Results round by round ====
Round	1	2	3	4	5	6	7	8	9	10	11	12	13	14	15	16	17	18	19	20	21	22	23	24	25	26	27	28	29	30	31	32	33	34	35	36	37	38	39	40	41	42	43	44	45	46
Ground	A	H	A	H	A	H	A	H	A	H	A	A	H	H	H	A	H	A	H	A	H	A	H	H	H	A	H	A	A	H	A	A	H	A	A	H	A	H	A	H	H	A	H	A	A	H
Result	L	W	L	W	L	W	D	W	D	W	L	L	W	W	W	W	W	L	W	L	W	W	W	L	W	L	W	W	L	W	W	W	L	D	D	D	D	D	D	W	W	D	W	W	L	W
Position	24	7	13	9	14	8	10	5	5	6	9	11	10	5	6	3	3	4	3	4	4	3	2	2	2	5	3	2	4	3	3	2	3	2	2	3	2	3	3	3	2	2	2	3	4	3

Source: 11v11.com
A = Away; H = Home; W = Win; D = Draw; L = Loss

==== League table ====
Pos	Team	Pld	W	D	L	GF	GA	GD	Pts	Promotion or relegation
1	Cambridge United (C, P)	46	26	13	7	87	40	+47	65	Promotion to the Third Division
2	Exeter City (P)	46	25	12	9	70	46	+24	62	Promotion to the Third Division
3	Colchester United (P)	46	25	9	12	77	43	+34	59	Promotion to the Third Division
4	Bradford City (P)	46	23	13	10	78	51	+27	59	Promotion to the Third Division
5	Swansea City	46	25	8	13	92	68	+24	58	

(C) Champions; (P) Promoted

==== Matches ====
21 August 1976 1	Cambridge United	2–0	Colchester United	Cambridge
	Biley 8', 38'	Report		Stadium: Abbey Stadium; Attendance: 3,056; Referee: John Homewood

24 August 1976 2	Colchester United	3–0	Halifax Town	Colchester
	Allinson 74', 75'; Gough 89'	Report		Stadium: Layer Road; Attendance: 2,489; Referee: D Reeves

28 August 1976 3	Rochdale	1–0	Colchester United	Rochdale
	Hanvey 65'	Report		Stadium: Spotland Stadium; Attendance: 1,440; Referee: T Mills

4 September 1976 4	Colchester United	3–1	Exeter City	Colchester
	Froggatt 25'; Cook 54'; Garwood 59'	Report	Smith 30' (o.g.)	Stadium: Layer Road; Attendance: 2,516; Referee: Colin Downey

11 September 1976 5	Watford	2–1	Colchester United	Watford
	Garner 76'; Mayes 78'	Report	Dowman 65'; Packer (red card) 72'	Stadium: Vicarage Road; Attendance: 5,386; Referee: A Turvey

18 September 1976 6	Colchester United	3–2	Crewe Alexandra	Colchester
	Froggatt 11'; Garwood 46'; Allinson 65'	Report	Abbott 2', 20'	Stadium: Layer Road; Attendance: 2,519; Referee: Tom Bune

25 September 1976 7	Bournemouth	0–0	Colchester United	Bournemouth
		Report		Stadium: Dean Court; Attendance: 3,881; Referee: D Biddle

1 October 1976 8	Colchester United	3–1	Workington	Colchester
	Garwood 10', 20'; Gough 82'	Report	Lowrey 70'	Stadium: Layer Road; Attendance: 2,957; Referee: Alan Gunn

8 October 1976 9	Southend United	0–0	Colchester United	Southend-on-Sea
		Report		Stadium: Roots Hall; Attendance: 6,690; Referee: K Salmon

16 October 1976 10	Colchester United	6–2	Hartlepool	Colchester
	Gough 2', 34'; Garwood 8', 17', 67'; Allinson 57'	Report	Bielby 12', 25'	Stadium: Layer Road; Attendance: 3,180; Referee: R Robinson

23 October 1976 11	Scunthorpe United	2–0	Colchester United	Scunthorpe
	Pilling 40'; Keeley 61'	Report		Stadium: Old Showground; Attendance: 3,157; Referee: R Horner

25 October 1976 12	Doncaster Rovers	3–2	Colchester United	Doncaster
	Taylor 5'; Kitchen 20'; Laidlaw 80'	Report	Packer 26' (pen.); Cook 28'	Stadium: Belle Vue; Attendance: 3,856; Referee: T Morris

30 October 1976 13	Colchester United	2–1	Brentford	Colchester
	Garwood 18'; Cook 24'	Report	Cross 19'	Stadium: Layer Road; Attendance: 3,607; Referee: Ron Challis

1 November 1976 14	Colchester United	4–0	Torquay United	Colchester
	Gough 15'; Garwood 25', 30'; Dowman 43'	Report		Stadium: Layer Road; Attendance: 3,102; Referee: M Taylor

12 November 1976 15	Colchester United	1–0	Stockport County	Colchester
	Dowman 85'	Report		Stadium: Layer Road; Attendance: 3,948; Referee: B Daniels

27 November 1976 16	Barnsley	0–1	Colchester United	Barnsley
		Report	Garwood 8'	Stadium: Oakwell; Attendance: 5,662; Referee: J Rice

4 December 1976 17	Colchester United	4–0	Darlington	Colchester
	Gough 8'; Dowman 36', 75'; Smith 80'	Report		Stadium: Layer Road; Attendance: 2,951; Referee: P Reeves

18 December 1976 18	Bradford City	1–0	Colchester United	Bradford
	Cooke 39'	Report		Stadium: Valley Parade; Attendance: 4,173; Referee: A Saunders

27 December 1976 19	Colchester United	1–0	Aldershot	Colchester
	Smith 43'	Report		Stadium: Layer Road; Attendance: 6,007; Referee: C Maskell

28 December 1976 20	Swansea City	2–1	Colchester United	Swansea
	May 77'; Charles 87'	Report	Bunkell 49'	Stadium: Vetch Field; Attendance: 5,666; Referee: B James

1 January 1977 21	Colchester United	5–0	Newport County	Colchester
	Gough 6', 63'; Smith 25'; Dowman 52'; Garwood 64'	Report		Stadium: Layer Road; Attendance: 4,614; Referee: Alf Grey

3 January 1977 22	Brentford	1–4	Colchester United	Brentford
	McCulloch 25'	Report	Garwood 47'; Gough 67', 85'; Dowman 80'	Stadium: Griffin Park; Attendance: 4,610; Referee: Tom Bune

18 January 1977 23	Colchester United	4–1	Southport	Colchester
	Bunkell 18'; Garwood 48'; Packer 76' (pen.); Allinson 84'	Report	Dewsnip 88'	Stadium: Layer Road; Attendance: 5,634; Referee: Rob Lewis

21 January 1977 24	Colchester United	0–1	Cambridge United	Colchester
		Report	Spriggs 24'	Stadium: Layer Road; Attendance: 7,639; Referee: T Spencer

5 February 1977 25	Colchester United	1–0	Rochdale	Colchester
	Dowman 27'	Report		Stadium: Layer Road; Attendance: 4,943; Referee: K Salmon

12 February 1977 26	Exeter City	1–0	Colchester United	Exeter
	Hodge 6'	Report		Stadium: St James Park; Attendance: 6,132; Referee: Malcolm Sinclair

19 February 1977 27	Colchester United	1–0	Watford	Colchester
	Packer 13' (pen.)	Report		Stadium: Layer Road; Attendance: 5,678; Referee: D Smith

22 February 1977 28	Newport County	1–2	Colchester United	Newport
	Emanuel 49'	Report	Gough 44', 55'	Stadium: Somerton Park; Attendance: 1,575; Referee: W Harvey

26 February 1977 29	Crewe Alexandra	1–0	Colchester United	Crewe
	Smith 31' (o.g.)	Report		Stadium: Gresty Road; Attendance: 2,410; Referee: K Hacken

4 March 1977 30	Colchester United	1–0	Bournemouth	Colchester
	Froggatt 14'	Report		Stadium: Layer Road; Attendance: 4,948; Referee: M Taylor

8 March 1977 31	Halifax Town	1–2	Colchester United	Halifax
	Lawson 44' (pen.)	Report	Packer 35'; Leslie 88'	Stadium: The Shay; Attendance: 2,097; Referee: N Glover

12 March 1977 32	Workington	2–4	Colchester United	Workington
	Kavanagh 39'; Prudham 44'	Report	Froggatt 37'; Gough 53'; Dowman 53'; Dowman 66'; Packer 83' (pen.)	Stadium: Borough Park; Attendance: 1,223; Referee: Bob Matthewson

19 March 1977 33	Colchester United	0–1	Southend United	Colchester
		Report	Morris 87'	Stadium: Layer Road; Attendance: 6,637; Referee: I Hunting

21 March 1977 34	Huddersfield Town	0–0	Colchester United	Huddersfield
		Report		Stadium: Leeds Road; Attendance: 7,508; Referee: J Butcher

26 March 1977 35	Hartlepool	2–2	Colchester United	Hartlepool
	Poskett 27' (pen.), 29'	Report	Allinson 44'; Dowman 52'	Stadium: Victoria Park; Attendance: 1,822; Referee: A Porter

2 April 1977 36	Colchester United	1–1	Scunthorpe United	Colchester
	Leslie 2'	Report	Lumby 34'	Stadium: Layer Road; Attendance: 3,799; Referee: B James

5 April 1977 37	Aldershot	1–1	Colchester United	Aldershot
	Bell 1'	Report	Gough 85'	Stadium: Recreation Ground; Attendance: 2,586; Referee: C White

8 April 1977 38	Colchester United	1–1	Swansea City	Colchester
	Dowman 83'	Report	Williams 58' (o.g.); Lally (red card) 70'	Stadium: Layer Road; Attendance: 5,184; Referee: Rob Lewis

11 April 1977 39	Torquay United	2–2	Colchester United	Torquay
	Rudge 5'; Lee 81'	Report	Dowman 24'; Gough 82'	Stadium: Plainmoor; Attendance: 3,189; Referee: B Stevens

15 April 1977 40	Colchester United	1–0	Doncaster Rovers	Colchester
	Gough 79'	Report		Stadium: Layer Road; Attendance: 4,668; Referee: D Smith

19 April 1977 41	Colchester United	3–1	Huddersfield Town	Colchester
	Smith 9', 63'; Garwood 39'	Report	Dowman 3' (o.g.)	Stadium: Layer Road; Attendance: 5,051; Referee: John Homewood

22 April 1977 42	Stockport County	1–1	Colchester United	Stockport
	Daniels 40'	Report	Garwood 18'	Stadium: Edgeley Park; Attendance: 2,826; Referee: D Richardson

29 April 1977 43	Colchester United	1–0	Barnsley	Colchester
	Smith 83'	Report		Stadium: Layer Road; Attendance: 5,802; Referee: Tom Bune

3 May 1977 44	Southport	1–3	Colchester United	Southport
	Walker 15' (o.g.)	Report	Froggatt 65', 78'; Gough 76'	Stadium: Haig Avenue; Attendance: 867; Referee: C Newsome

7 May 1977 45	Darlington	2–0	Colchester United	Darlington
	Rowles 21', 48'	Report		Stadium: Feethams; Attendance: 1,964; Referee: M Lowe

14 May 1977 46	Colchester United	2–1	Bradford City	Colchester
	Ratcliffe 1' (o.g.); Allinson 41'	Report	Watson 5'	Stadium: Layer Road; Attendance: 8,912; Referee: Malcolm Sinclair

=== League Cup ===
14 August 1976 1st round 1st leg	Millwall	2–1	Colchester United	New Cross
	Seasman 22'; Shanahan 38'	Report	Smith 2'	Stadium: The Den; Attendance: 4,599; Referee: C Maskell

17 August 1976 1st round 2nd leg	Colchester United	2–1	Millwall	Colchester
	Gough 35'; Garwood 41'	Report	Evans 60'	Stadium: Layer Road; Attendance: 3,155; Referee: B Daniels
Note: Colchester and Millwall drew 3–3 on aggregate

30 August 1976 1st round replay	Colchester United	4–4 (a.e.t.) (2–4 p)	Millwall	Colchester
	Garwood 62', 82', 118'; Bunkell 72' (pen.)	Report	Lee 34', 39'; Salvage 70' (pen.); Fairbrother 119'	Stadium: Layer Road; Attendance: 3,695; Referee: Alf Grey

=== FA Cup ===
20 November 1976 1st round	Cambridge United	1–1	Colchester United	Cambridge
	Fallon 89'	Report	Packer 72' (pen.)	Stadium: Abbey Stadium; Attendance: 5,090; Referee: R Toseland

24 November 1976 1st round replay	Colchester United	2–0	Cambridge United	Colchester
	Garwood 3'; Leslie 16'	Report		Stadium: Layer Road; Attendance: 6,041; Referee: R Toseland

11 December 1976 2nd round	Colchester United	A–A	Brentford	Colchester
		Report		Stadium: Layer Road; Attendance: 5,286; Referee: J Sewell
Note: Match abandoned after 62-minutes with the score at 0–0 due to a frozen pitch.

20 December 1976 2nd round	Colchester United	3–2	Brentford	Colchester
	Gough 6'; Froggatt 7'; Packer 88' (pen.)	Report	Rolph 49'; Fraser 74'	Stadium: Layer Road; Attendance: 4,730; Referee: J Sewell

8 January 1977 3rd round	Kettering Town	2–3	Colchester United	Kettering
	Clayton 80'; Kellock 81'	Report	Froggatt 7'; Garwood 30', 60'	Stadium: Rockingham Road; Attendance: 7,176; Referee: John Homewood

29 January 1977 4th round	Colchester United	1–1	Derby County	Colchester
	Garwood 90'	Report	Hales 23'	Stadium: Layer Road; Attendance: 14,030; Referee: R Crabb

2 February 1977 4th round replay	Derby County	1–0	Colchester United	Derby
	James 44'	Report		Stadium: Baseball Ground; Attendance: 22,155; Referee: R Crabb

== Squad statistics ==
=== Appearances and goals ===
No.	Pos	Nat	Player	Total		Fourth Division		FA Cup		League Cup	
No.	Pos	Nat	Player	Apps	Goals	Apps	Goals	Apps	Goals	Apps	Goals
	GK	(Wales) WAL	Mike Walker	53	0	44	0	6	0	3	0
	DF	(England) ENG	Micky Cook	55	3	46	3	6	0	3	0
	DF	(England) ENG	Steve Dowman	42	12	33+3	12	6	0	0	0
	DF	(England) ENG	Mick Packer	47	7	35+4	5	4+1	2	3	0
	DF	(England) ENG	Lindsay Smith	54	7	45	6	6	0	3	1
	DF	(England) ENG	Johnny Williams	52	0	43	0	6	0	3	0
	MF	(England) ENG	Ray Bunkell	24	3	16+2	2	3	0	3	1
	MF	(England) ENG	Paul Dyer	43	0	29+5	0	4+2	0	3	0
	MF	(England) ENG	Steve Foley	10	0	10	0	0	0	0	0
	MF	(England) ENG	Steve Leslie	50	3	40+1	2	6	1	3	0
	FW	(England) ENG	Ian Allinson	44	7	31+9	7	1+1	0	0+2	0
	FW	(England) ENG	John Froggatt	52	8	43	6	6	2	3	0
	FW	(England) ENG	Colin Garwood	51	24	40+2	16	6	4	3	4
	FW	(England) ENG	Bobby Gough	52	19	43	17	6	1	3	1
Players who appeared for Colchester who left during the season
	GK	(England) ENG	Glenn Ellis	2	0	2	0	0	0	0	0
	DF	(England) ENG	Stewart Bright	5	0	5	0	0	0	0	0
	DF	(England) ENG	Barry Dominey	3	0	1+2	0	0	0	0	0

=== Goalscorers ===
Place	Nationality	Position	Name	Fourth Division	FA Cup	League Cup	Total
1	(England)	FW	Colin Garwood	16	4	4	24
2	(England)	FW	Bobby Gough	17	1	1	19
3	(England)	CB	Steve Dowman	12	0	0	12
4	(England)	FW	John Froggatt	6	2	0	8
5	(England)	WG	Ian Allinson	7	0	0	7
5	(England)	FB	Mick Packer	5	2	0	7
5	(England)	CB	Lindsay Smith	6	0	1	7
8	(England)	MF	Ray Bunkell	2	0	1	3
8	(England)	FB	Micky Cook	3	0	0	3
8	(England)	MF	Steve Leslie	2	1	0	3
			Own goals	1	0	0	1
			TOTALS	77	10	7	94

=== Disciplinary record ===
Nationality	Position	Name	Fourth Division		FA Cup		League Cup		Total	
Nationality	Position	Name	Booked	Sent off (straight red)	Booked	Sent off (straight red)	Booked	Sent off (straight red)	Booked	Sent off (straight red)
(England)	FB	Mick Packer	2	1	0	0	0	0	2	1
(England)	FW	John Froggatt	1	0	0	0	0	0	1	0
(England)	FB	Johnny Williams	1	0	0	0	0	0	1	0
		TOTALS	4	1	0	0	0	0	4	1

=== Clean sheets ===
Number of games goalkeepers kept a clean sheet.

Place	Nationality	Player	Fourth Division	FA Cup	League Cup	Total
1	(Wales)	Mike Walker	14	1	0	15
2	(England)	Glenn Ellis	1	0	0	1
		TOTALS	15	1	0	16

=== Player debuts ===
Players making their first-team Colchester United debut in a fully competitive match.

Position	Nationality	Player	Date	Opponent	Ground	Notes
CB	(England)	Steve Dowman	24 August 1976	Halifax Town	Layer Road	
GK	(England)	Glenn Ellis	19 February 1977	Watford	Layer Road	

== See also ==
- List of Colchester United F.C. seasons
