= 1977–78 Colchester United F.C. season =

Colchester United
1977–78 season
- Chairman: Jack Rippingale
- Manager: Bobby Roberts
- Stadium: Layer Road
- Third Division: 8th
- FA Cup: 2nd round (eliminated by Watford)
- League Cup: 3rd round (eliminated by Leeds United)
- Top goalscorer: League: Bobby Gough (13); All: Bobby Gough (17)
- Highest home attendance: 6,447 v Gillingham, 13 January 1978
- Lowest home attendance: 2,554 v Rotherham United, 3 May 1978
- Average home league attendance: 4,566
- Biggest win: 4–0 v Blackburn Rovers, 7 September 1977 v Portsmouth, 7 March 1978
- Biggest defeat: 0–4 v Leeds United, 26 October 1977 v Preston North End, 28 February 1978
Home colours

The 1977–78 season was Colchester United's 36th season in their history and first season back in third tier of English football, the Third Division following promotion the previous season. Alongside competing in the Third Division, the club also participated in the FA Cup and the League Cup.

Colchester made steady progress under Bobby Roberts ending the campaign in a strong eighth in the league table. They were eliminated in the League Cup by Leeds United in the third round, while they could not capitalise on last seasons FA Cup success, exiting the competition in the second round to Watford.

== Season overview ==
A strong start to the season saw Colchester reach the top of the Third Division table following four wins in the first five games. A slump in form ended their promotion hopes following one win in ten games after January and the sale of Colin Garwood to Portsmouth for £25,000. They ended the season in eighth position, eight points behind promoted Preston North End.

In the cups, a League Cup run saw the U's thrash former manager Jim Smith's Second Division Blackburn Rovers 4–0 in a second round replay before facing old cup adversaries Leeds United in the third round. Colchester were humbled 4–0 at Elland Road. In the FA Cup, Bournemouth were seen off after two replays, but Colchester succumbed to Watford in the second round.

== Players ==
As of match played 3 May 1978.

Name	Position	Nationality	Place of birth	Date of birth	Apps	Goals	Signed from	Date signed	Fee
Goalkeepers
Ian Cranstone	GK	(England)	Rochford		0	0	(England) Tottenham Hotspur	Summer 1977	Free transfer
Bobby Hamilton	GK				0	0	Unknown	Summer 1977	
Mike Walker	GK	(Wales)	Colwyn Bay	28 November 1945 (aged 31)	202	0	(England) Watford	July 1973	£4,000
Defenders
Micky Cook	FB	(England)	Enfield	9 April 1951 (aged 26)	344	13	(England) Orient	1 March 1969	Free transfer
Steve Dowman	CB	(England)	Ilford	15 April 1958 (aged 19)	42	12	Apprentice	24 August 1976 (Note: Date of signing refers to the date of the player's first game for the club)	Free transfer
Mick Packer	FB	(England)	Willesden	20 April 1950 (aged 27)	167	11	(England) Watford	July 1973	Free transfer
Steve Wignall	CB	(England)	Liverpool	17 September 1954 (aged 22)	0	0	(England) Doncaster Rovers	September 1977	£5,000
Johnny Williams	FB	(England)	Tottenham	26 March 1947 (aged 30)	91	0	(England) Watford	June 1976	Undisclosed
Steve Wright	CB	(England)	Clacton-on-Sea	16 June 1959 (aged 17)	0	0	(England) Woods Athletic	1 October 1977	Free transfer
Midfielders
Ray Bunkell	MF	(England)	Edmonton	18 September 1949 (aged 27)	109	8	(England) Swindon Town	December 1973	Part exchange
Russell Cotton	MF	(England)	Wellington	4 April 1960 (aged 17)	0	0	Apprentice	26 October 1977	Free transfer
Paul Dyer	MF	(England)	Leicester	24 January 1953 (aged 24)	83	2	(England) Notts County	Summer 1975	Undisclosed
Tony Evans	MF	(England)	Colchester	14 March 1960 (aged 17)	0	0	Apprentice	4 March 1978	Free transfer
Steve Foley	MF	(England)	Clacton-on-Sea	21 June 1953 (aged 23)	149	29	Apprentice	July 1969	Free transfer
Steve Leslie	MF	(England)	Hornsey	4 September 1952 (aged 24)	237	37	Apprentice	20 April 1971	Free transfer
Eddie Rowles	MF	(England)	Gosport	10 March 1951 (aged 26)	0	0	(England) Darlington	26 December 1977	£15,000
Forwards
Ian Allinson	WG	(England)	Hitchin	1 October 1957 (aged 19)	50	7	Apprentice	Summer 1974	Free transfer
Bobby Gough	FW	(England)	Ladywood	20 July 1949 (aged 27)	74	24	(England) Southport	January 1976	£7,000
Gary Harvey	FW	(England)	Colchester	19 November 1961 (aged 15)	0	0	Apprentice	March 1978	Free transfer

== Transfers ==
=== In ===
Date	Position	Nationality	Name	From	Fee	Ref.
Summer 1977	GK	(England)	Ian Cranstone	(England) Tottenham Hotspur	Free transfer	
Summer 1977	GK		Bobby Hamilton	Unknown	Unknown	
September 1977	CB	(England)	Steve Wignall	(England) Doncaster Rovers	£5,000	
1 October 1977	CB	(England)	Steve Wright	(England) Woods Athletic	Free transfer	(Note: Date of signing refers to the date of the player signing his first professional contract)
26 October 1977	MF	(England)	Russell Cotton	Apprentice	Free transfer	
26 December 1977	MF	(England)	Eddie Rowles	(England) Darlington	£15,000	(Note: Date of signing refers to the date of the player's first game for the club)
March 1978	FW	(England)	Gary Harvey	Apprentice	Free transfer	
4 March 1978	MF	(England)	Tony Evans	Apprentice	Free transfer	

- Total spending: ▼ ~ £20,000

=== Out ===
Date	Position	Nationality	Name	To	Fee	Ref.
October 1977	CB	(England)	Lindsay Smith	(England) Cambridge United	£12,000	
February 1978	FW	(England)	John Froggatt	(England) Port Vale	£10,000	
4 March 1978	FW	(England)	Colin Garwood	(England) Portsmouth	£25,000	

- Total incoming: ▲ ~ £52,000

=== Loans out ===
Date	Position	Nationality	Name	To	End date	Ref.
Summer 1977	CB	(England)	Lindsay Smith	(England) Charlton Athletic	October 1977	
October 1977	CB	(England)	Lindsay Smith	(England) Millwall	October 1977	

== Match details ==
=== Third Division ===
==== Results round by round ====
Round	1	2	3	4	5	6	7	8	9	10	11	12	13	14	15	16	17	18	19	20	21	22	23	24	25	26	27	28	29	30	31	32	33	34	35	36	37	38	39	40	41	42	43	44	45	46
Ground	A	H	H	A	H	A	A	H	H	A	A	H	H	A	H	A	H	A	A	H	H	A	A	H	A	H	A	H	A	H	A	A	H	A	A	H	H	A	H	H	A	H	A	A	H	H
Result	W	W	W	L	W	D	L	D	L	W	D	D	D	L	W	L	W	L	W	W	D	D	L	D	W	D	L	D	D	D	L	L	W	L	L	W	W	D	L	W	D	D	D	W	D	D
Position	4	1	1	1	1	1	2	1	4	3	3	3	2	10	1	8	4	8	7	4	7	7	8	8	7	5	8	8	7	7	9	13	10	11	11	10	9	9	12	11	12	11	11	9	9	8

Source: 11v11.com
A = Away; H = Home; W = Win; D = Draw; L = Loss

==== League table ====
Pos	Team	Pld	W	D	L	GF	GA	GD	Pts
6	Walsall	46	18	17	11	61	50	+11	53
7	Gillingham	46	15	20	11	67	60	+7	50
8	Colchester United	46	15	18	13	55	44	+11	48
9	Chesterfield	46	17	14	15	58	49	+9	48
10	Swindon Town	46	16	16	14	67	60	+7	48

Source: rsssf.com

==== Matches ====
20 August 1977 1	Gillingham	1–3	Colchester United	Gillingham
	Unknown goalscorer	Report	Foley 22'; Packer 50'; Gough 75'	Stadium: Priestfield Stadium; Attendance: 3,450; Referee: K Salmon

23 August 1977 2	Colchester United	3–0	Bradford City	Colchester
	Froggatt 26'; Gough 38'; Leslie 77'	Report		Stadium: Layer Road; Attendance: 4,371; Referee: Ron Challis

27 August 1977 3	Colchester United	2–0	Chester	Colchester
	Gough 81', 85'	Report		Stadium: Layer Road; Attendance: 4,169; Referee: Alan Gunn

2 September 1977 4	Tranmere Rovers	1–0	Colchester United	Birkenhead
	Moore 82'	Report		Stadium: Prenton Park; Attendance: 3,263; Referee: R Chadwick

9 September 1977 5	Colchester United	3–1	Plymouth Argyle	Colchester
	Williams 48'; Gough 73'; Dowman 83'	Report	Hall 58'	Stadium: Layer Road; Attendance: 5,719; Referee: Colin Downey

13 September 1977 6	Portsmouth	0–0	Colchester United	Portsmouth
		Report		Stadium: Fratton Park; Attendance: 11,757; Referee: Malcolm Sinclair

17 September 1977 7	Rotherham United	1–0	Colchester United	Rotherham
	Womble 71'	Report		Stadium: Millmoor; Attendance: 4,906; Referee: N Glover

24 September 1977 8	Colchester United	0–0	Preston North End	Colchester
		Report		Stadium: Layer Road; Attendance: 4,978; Referee: Tom Bune

27 September 1977 9	Colchester United	2–3	Port Vale	Colchester
	Gough 17'; Garwood 90'	Report	Beech 10'; Beamish 55', 85'	Stadium: Layer Road; Attendance: 4,820; Referee: M Taylor

1 October 1977 10	Carlisle United	1–3	Colchester United	Carlisle
	McVitie 86'	Report	Garwood 37', 85'; Gough 83'	Stadium: Brunton Park; Attendance: 4,611; Referee: K Redfearn

5 October 1977 11	Chesterfield	0–0	Colchester United	Chesterfield
		Report		Stadium: Saltergate; Attendance: 4,575; Referee: David Webb

8 October 1977 12	Colchester United	0–0	Colchester United	Colchester
		Report		Stadium: Layer Road; Attendance: 4,586; Referee: C White

14 October 1977 13	Colchester United	1–1	Oxford United	Colchester
	Foley 29'	Report	Foley 51'	Stadium: Layer Road; Attendance: 4,893; Referee: Alf Grey

22 October 1977 14	Cambridge United	2–0	Colchester United	Cambridge
	Spriggs 43', 45'	Report	Leslie (yellow card) (red card)	Stadium: Abbey Stadium; Attendance: 5,423; Referee: J Sewell

28 October 1977 15	Colchester United	3–0	Peterborough United	Colchester
	Allinson 38'; Packer 40'; Gough 65'	Report		Stadium: Layer Road; Attendance: 4,827; Referee: B Daniels

5 November 1977 16	Walsall	4–2	Colchester United	Walsall
	Serella 17'; Dennehy 55'; Buckley 56', 80'	Report	Allinson 51'; Garwood 87'	Stadium: Fellows Park; Attendance: 4,231; Referee: Clive Thomas

11 November 1977 17	Colchester United	2–0	Swindon Town	Colchester
	Garwood 35'; Bunkell 60'	Report		Stadium: Layer Road; Attendance: 4,688; Referee: D Reeves

19 November 1977 18	Wrexham	2–1	Colchester United	Wrexham
	Shinton 7'; Whittle 9'	Report	Wignall 30'	Stadium: Racecourse Ground; Attendance: 9,198; Referee: G Owen

3 December 1977 19	Sheffield Wednesday	1–2	Colchester United	Sheffield
	Wylde 63'	Report	Cook 26'; Garwood 53'	Stadium: Hillsborough Stadium; Attendance: 9,000; Referee: Joe Worrall

9 December 1977 20	Colchester United	3–1	Exeter City	Colchester
	Dowman 13'; Gough 63'; Garwood 66'	Report	Holman 61'	Stadium: Layer Road; Attendance: 4,267; Referee: C Maskell

26 December 1977 21	Colchester United	1–1	Lincoln City	Colchester
	Froggatt 18'	Report	Graham 69'	Stadium: Layer Road; Attendance: 5,840; Referee: B Hill

27 December 1977 22	Bury	1–1	Colchester United	Bury
	Tucker 53'	Report	Foley 79'	Stadium: Gigg Lane; Attendance: 5,409; Referee: R Bridges

31 December 1977 23	Shrewsbury Town	1–0	Colchester United	Shrewsbury
	Irvine 74'	Report		Stadium: Gay Meadow; Attendance: 4,336; Referee: N Ashley

2 January 1978 24	Colchester United	1–1	Walsall	Colchester
	Gough 67'	Report	Buckley 38'	Stadium: Layer Road; Attendance: 6,039; Referee: T Cox

7 January 1978 25	Bradford City	1–2	Colchester United	Bradford
	Wright 20'	Report	Gough 3'; Dowman 13'	Stadium: Valley Parade; Attendance: 3,266; Referee: P Richardson

13 January 1978 26	Colchester United	1–1	Gillingham	Colchester
	Gough 39'	Report	Walker 82'	Stadium: Layer Road; Attendance: 6,447; Referee: A Turvey

21 January 1978 27	Chester	2–1	Colchester United	Chester
	Crossley 45' (pen.); I. Edwards 58'	Report	Rowles 28'	Stadium: Sealand Road; Attendance: 2,855; Referee: D Richardson

27 January 1978 28	Colchester United	0–0	Tranmere Rovers	Colchester
		Report		Stadium: Layer Road; Attendance: 4,465; Referee: A Robinson

4 February 1978 29	Plymouth Argyle	1–1	Colchester United	Plymouth
	Taylor 5'	Report	Rowles 28'	Stadium: Home Park; Attendance: 4,639; Referee: W Gow

25 February 1978 30	Colchester United	2–2	Carlisle United	Colchester
	Garwood 3'; Dowman 7'	Report	Rafferty 51'; Lathan 89'	Stadium: Layer Road; Attendance: 3,867; Referee: Rob Lewis

28 February 1978 31	Preston North End	4–0	Colchester United	Preston
	Bruce 60' (pen.), 75', 78' (pen.), 85' (pen.)	Report		Stadium: Deepdale; Attendance: 9,225; Referee: Peter Willis

4 March 1978 32	Hereford United	1–0	Colchester United	Hereford
	Barton 44' (pen.)	Report		Stadium: Edgar Street; Attendance: 3,831; Referee: A McDonald

7 March 1978 33	Colchester United	4–0	Portsmouth	Colchester
	Foley 17'; Rowles 28'; Taylor 55' (o.g.); Allinson 67'	Report		Stadium: Layer Road; Attendance: 3,570

11 March 1978 34	Oxford United	3–0	Colchester United	Oxford
	Curran 47', 71'; Jeffrey 86'	Report		Stadium: Manor Ground; Attendance: 4,060; Referee: K Baker

14 March 1978 35	Peterborough United	1–0	Colchester United	Peterborough
	Camp 83'	Report		Stadium: London Road Stadium; Attendance: 4,468; Referee: R Perkin

17 March 1978 36	Colchester United	2–1	Cambridge United	Colchester
	Allinson 24'; Wignall 80'	Report	Streete 51'; Finney (yellow card) (red card)	Stadium: Layer Road; Attendance: 5,260; Referee: D Lloyd

25 March 1978 37	Colchester United	1–0	Bury	Colchester
	Allinson 77'	Report		Stadium: Layer Road; Attendance: 3,661; Referee: David Hutchinson

27 March 1978 38	Lincoln City	0–0	Colchester United	Lincoln
		Report		Stadium: Sincil Bank; Attendance: 4,709; Referee: P Reeves

1 April 1978 39	Colchester United	1–2	Shrewsbury Town	Colchester
	Leslie 54'	Report	Loughnane 38'; Biggins 52'	Stadium: Layer Road; Attendance: 2,910

4 April 1978 40	Colchester United	2–0	Chesterfield	Colchester
	Gough 60'; Leslie 64'	Report		Stadium: Layer Road; Attendance: 3,303; Referee: J Bent

8 April 1978 41	Swindon Town	0–0	Colchester United	Swindon
		Report		Stadium: County Ground; Attendance: 4,596; Referee: Clive White

15 April 1978 42	Colchester United	1–1	Wrexham	Colchester
	Foley 12'	Report	Thomas 13'	Stadium: Layer Road; Attendance: 5,385; Referee: T Spencer

22 April 1978 43	Exeter City	0–0	Colchester United	Exeter
		Report		Stadium: St James Park; Attendance: 3,853; Referee: L Burden

24 April 1978 44	Port Vale	0–3	Colchester United	Burslem
		Report	Allinson 37'; Foley 54', 60'	Stadium: Vale Park; Attendance: 3,684; Referee: T Morris

29 April 1978 45	Colchester United	1–1	Sheffield Wednesday	Colchester
	Dowman 3'	Report	Rushbury 69'	Stadium: Layer Road; Attendance: 4,337; Referee: John Homewood

3 May 1978 46	Colchester United	0–0	Rotherham United	Colchester
		Report		Stadium: Layer Road; Attendance: 2,554; Referee: H Robinson

=== League Cup ===
13 August 1977 1st round 1st leg	Aldershot	1–1	Colchester United	Aldershot
	Crosby 25'	Report	Gough 15'	Stadium: Recreation Ground; Attendance: 2,574; Referee: J Bent

16 August 1977 1st round 2nd leg	Colchester United	4–1	Aldershot	Colchester
	Howitt 35' (o.g.); Dowman 41'; Froggatt 62', 69'	Report	Needham 11'	Stadium: Layer Road; Attendance: 3,360
Note: Colchester won 5–2 on aggregate

31 August 1977 2nd round	Blackburn Rovers	1–1	Colchester United	Blackburn
	Metcalfe 8'	Report	Garwood 38'	Stadium: Ewood Park; Attendance: 6,193; Referee: G Flint

7 September 1977 2nd round replay	Colchester United	4–0	Blackburn Rovers	Colchester
	Gough 22', 76'; Allinson 50'; Garwood 83'	Report		Stadium: Layer Road; Attendance: 5,843; Referee: John Homewood

26 October 1977 3rd round	Leeds United	4–0	Colchester United	Leeds
	Jordan 12'; Graham 21'; Lorimer 53'; Hankin 83'	Report		Stadium: Elland Road; Attendance: 17,713; Referee: J Butcher

=== FA Cup ===
26 November 1977 1st round	Colchester United	1–1	Bournemouth	Colchester
	Gough 83'	Report	Howarth 29'	Stadium: Layer Road; Attendance: 4,465; Referee: Clive White

29 November 1977 1st round replay	Bournemouth	0–0	Colchester United	Bournemouth
		Report		Stadium: Dean Court; Attendance: 3,838

5 December 1977 1st round 2nd replay	Colchester United	4–1	Bournemouth	Watford
	Dowman 26'; Garwood 32', 39', 89'	Report	Barton 8'	Stadium: Vicarage Road; Attendance: 2,230; Referee: Ron Challis

17 December 1977 2nd round	Watford	2–0	Colchester United	Watford
	Jenkins 31'; Mercer 59'	Report		Stadium: Vicarage Road; Attendance: 11,907; Referee: Tom Bune

== Squad statistics ==
=== Appearances and goals ===
No.	Pos	Nat	Player	Total		Third Division		FA Cup		League Cup	
No.	Pos	Nat	Player	Apps	Goals	Apps	Goals	Apps	Goals	Apps	Goals
	GK	(Wales) WAL	Mike Walker	55	0	46	0	4	0	5	0
	DF	(England) ENG	Micky Cook	53	1	44	1	4	0	5	0
	DF	(England) ENG	Steve Dowman	52	7	43	5	4	1	5	1
	DF	(England) ENG	Mick Packer	52	2	44	2	3	0	5	0
	DF	(England) ENG	Steve Wignall	38	2	32+2	2	4	0	0	0
	DF	(England) ENG	Johnny Williams	35	1	26+1	1	3	0	5	0
	DF	(England) ENG	Steve Wright	1	0	1	0	0	0	0	0
	MF	(England) ENG	Ray Bunkell	28	1	24	1	1	0	3	0
	MF	(England) ENG	Russell Cotton	2	0	1+1	0	0	0	0	0
	MF	(England) ENG	Paul Dyer	32	0	21+9	0	0+1	0	1	0
	MF	(England) ENG	Tony Evans	7	0	5+2	0	0	0	0	0
	MF	(England) ENG	Steve Foley	35	7	29+3	7	1	0	2	0
	MF	(England) ENG	Steve Leslie	49	3	41	3	4	0	4	0
	MF	(England) ENG	Eddie Rowles	9	3	9	3	0	0	0	0
	FW	(England) ENG	Ian Allinson	54	7	45	6	4	0	5	1
	FW	(England) ENG	Bobby Gough	51	17	42	13	4	1	5	3
Players who appeared for Colchester who left during the season
	FW	(England) ENG	John Froggatt	34	4	25	2	4	0	5	2
	FW	(England) ENG	Colin Garwood	39	13	28+2	8	4	3	5	2

=== Goalscorers ===
Place	Nationality	Position	Name	Third Division	FA Cup	League Cup	Total
1	(England)	FW	Bobby Gough	13	1	3	17
2	(England)	FW	Colin Garwood	8	3	2	13
3	(England)	WG	Ian Allinson	6	0	1	7
3	(England)	CB	Steve Dowman	5	1	1	7
3	(England)	MF	Steve Foley	7	0	0	7
6	(England)	FW	John Froggatt	2	0	2	4
7	(England)	MF	Steve Leslie	3	0	0	3
7	(England)	MF	Eddie Rowles	3	0	0	3
9	(England)	FB	Mick Packer	2	0	0	2
9	(England)	CB	Steve Wignall	2	0	0	2
11	(England)	MF	Ray Bunkell	1	0	0	1
11	(England)	FB	Micky Cook	1	0	0	1
11	(England)	FB	Johnny Williams	1	0	0	1
			Own goals	1	0	1	2
			TOTALS	55	5	10	70

=== Disciplinary record ===
Nationality	Position	Name	Third Division		FA Cup		League Cup		Total	
Nationality	Position	Name	Booked	Sent off (straight red)	Booked	Sent off (straight red)	Booked	Sent off (straight red)	Booked	Sent off (straight red)
(England)	MF	Steve Leslie	1	1	0	0	0	0	1	1
(England)	WG	Ian Allinson	1	0	0	0	0	0	1	0
(England)	FW	Colin Garwood	1	0	0	0	0	0	1	0
(England)	FW	Bobby Gough	1	0	0	0	0	0	1	0
		TOTALS	4	1	0	0	0	0	4	1

=== Clean sheets ===
Number of games goalkeepers kept a clean sheet.

Place	Nationality	Player	Third Division	FA Cup	League Cup	Total
1	(Wales)	Mike Walker	17	1	1	19
		TOTALS	17	1	1	19

=== Player debuts ===
Players making their first-team Colchester United debut in a fully competitive match.

Position	Nationality	Player	Date	Opponent	Ground	Notes
CB	(England)	Steve Wignall	13 September 1977	Portsmouth	Fratton Park	
MF	(England)	Eddie Rowles	27 December 1977	Bury	Gigg Lane	
MF	(England)	Tony Evans	4 March 1978	Hereford United	Edgar Street	
CB	(England)	Steve Wright	8 April 1978	Swindon Town	County Ground	
MF	(England)	Russell Cotton	24 April 1978	Port Vale	Vale Park	

== See also ==
- List of Colchester United F.C. seasons
