= 1979–80 Colchester United F.C. season =

Colchester United
1979–80 season
- Chairman: Jack Rippingale
- Manager: Bobby Roberts
- Stadium: Layer Road
- Third Division: 5th
- FA Cup: 3rd round (eliminated by Reading)
- League Cup: 2nd round (eliminated by Aston Villa)
- Top goalscorer: League: Trevor Lee (17); All: Trevor Lee (18)
- Highest home attendance: 6,221 v Aston Villa, 28 August 1979
- Lowest home attendance: 2,346 v Mansfield Town, 18 September 1979
- Average home league attendance: 3,932
- Biggest win: 6–1 v Brentford, 22 March 1980
- Biggest defeat: 0–3 v Rotherham United, 25 August 1979 v Chesterfield, 8 September 1979 v Blackburn Rovers, 27 October 1979 v Sheffield Wednesday, 2 February 1980
Home colours

The 1979–80 season was Colchester United's 38th season in their history and third successive season in third tier of English football, the Third Division. Alongside competing in the Third Division, the club also participated in the FA Cup and the League Cup.

An excellent season in the league took Colchester to their highest finish since the 1956–57 season with fifth position, having occupied the top four spots for the majority of the campaign. Colchester exited the FA Cup in round three to Reading, while they fell to defeat after a penalty shoot-out to First Division side Aston Villa.

== Season overview ==
With a very much unchanged squad from the previous campaign, Colchester faced First Division opposition in the League Cup second round after beating Watford over two legs in the first round. Rekindling memories of the Quarter-final tie five years prior, the U's were drawn at home to Aston Villa, who won 2–0 at Layer Road. However, in the away fixture at Villa Park, Colchester earned a 2–0 victory to take the tie to extra time and penalties. The penalty takers were successful enough that it was necessary for the goalkeepers to take their turns. Mike Walker stepped up to take his penalty for Colchester and missed, meaning the U's bowed out 9–8.

Keeping track with the league leaders for much of the season – and even being level on points with first-placed Sheffield United at one stage – Colchester had ten away wins to their name before successive defeats to Blackpool, Blackburn Rovers and Reading in February and March 1980. Injuries to Steve Foley and Bobby Gough contributed to the U's downturn in form, and having occupied a top four spot for much of the season, Colchester had to be content with a fifth-place finish, six points short of the promotion places. It was the closest United had come to Second Division football since the 1956–57 season, but attendances weren't reflective of on-field performance, with a league average gate of 3,818, the third-lowest in the division ahead of Wimbledon and Chester.

== Players ==
As of match played 2 May 1980.

Name	Position	Nationality	Place of birth	Date of birth	Apps	Goals	Signed from	Date signed	Fee
Goalkeepers
Ian Cranstone	GK	(England)	Rochford		0	0	(England) Tottenham Hotspur	Summer 1977	Free transfer
Bobby Hamilton	GK				0	0	Unknown	Summer 1977	
Mike Walker	GK	(Wales)	Colwyn Bay	28 November 1945 (aged 33)	312	0	(England) Watford	July 1973	£4,000
Defenders
Micky Cook	FB	(England)	Enfield	9 April 1951 (aged 28)	451	15	(England) Orient	1 March 1969	Free transfer
Leo Cusenza	FB	(England)	Edmonton	20 February 1963 (aged 16)	0	0	Apprentice	Summer 1979	Free transfer
Steve Dowman	CB	(England)	Ilford	15 April 1958 (aged 21)	141	24	Apprentice	24 August 1976 (Note: Date of signing refers to the date of the player's first game for the club)	Free transfer
Mick Packer	FB	(England)	Willesden	20 April 1950 (aged 29)	268	14	(England) Watford	July 1973	Free transfer
Steve Wignall	CB	(England)	Liverpool	17 September 1954 (aged 24)	89	6	(England) Doncaster Rovers	September 1977	£5,000
Steve Wright	CB	(England)	Clacton-on-Sea	16 June 1959 (aged 19)	43	1	(England) Woods Athletic	1 October 1977	Free transfer
Midfielders
Russell Cotton	MF	(England)	Wellington	4 April 1960 (aged 19)	3	0	Apprentice	26 October 1977	Free transfer
Tony Evans	MF	(England)	Colchester	14 March 1960 (aged 19)	16	2	Apprentice	4 March 1978	Free transfer
Steve Foley	MF	(England)	Clacton-on-Sea	21 June 1953 (aged 25)	226	43	Apprentice	July 1969	Free transfer
Steve Leslie	MF	(England)	Hornsey	4 September 1952 (aged 26)	290	40	Apprentice	20 April 1971	Free transfer
Eddie Rowles	MF	(England)	Gosport	10 March 1951 (aged 28)	32	8	(England) Darlington	26 December 1977	£15,000
Forwards
Ian Allinson	WG	(England)	Hitchin	1 October 1957 (aged 21)	159	19	Apprentice	Summer 1974	Free transfer
Bobby Gough	FW	(England)	Ladywood	20 July 1949 (aged 29)	175	63	(England) Southport	January 1976	£7,000
Gary Harvey	FW	(England)	Colchester	19 November 1961 (aged 17)	0	0	Apprentice	March 1978	Free transfer
Bobby Hodge	WG	(England)	Exeter	30 April 1952 (aged 27)	38	4	(England) Exeter City	September 1978	£15,000
Trevor Lee	FW	(England)	Lewisham	3 June 1954 (aged 24)	32	12	(England) Millwall	November 1978	£15,000

== Transfers ==
=== In ===
Date	Position	Nationality	Name	From	Fee	Ref.
Summer 1979	FB	(England)	Leo Cusenza	Apprentice	Free transfer	

- Total spending: ▼ ~ £0

=== Out ===
Date	Position	Nationality	Name	To	Fee	Ref.
31 August 1979	MF	(England)	Ray Bunkell	Colchester United reserve team manager	Free transfer	(Note: Date of departure refers to the date of the player's final game for the club)
26 December 1979	MF	(England)	Paul Dyer	(England) Gravesend & Northfleet	Released	

- Total incoming: ▲ ~ £0

== Match details ==
=== Third Division ===
==== Results round by round ====
Round	1	2	3	4	5	6	7	8	9	10	11	12	13	14	15	16	17	18	19	20	21	22	23	24	25	26	27	28	29	30	31	32	33	34	35	36	37	38	39	40	41	42	43	44	45	46
Ground	A	H	A	H	A	H	H	A	H	A	H	A	A	H	H	A	H	A	A	H	A	H	A	H	H	H	A	H	A	A	H	A	H	A	H	A	H	A	H	A	H	A	H	A	A	H
Result	W	W	L	L	L	D	W	W	D	W	D	W	W	W	W	L	D	D	L	W	W	D	L	D	D	D	W	L	W	L	W	W	W	L	L	L	W	L	D	D	W	L	D	W	L	W
Position	4	1	8	9	19	17	14	10	9	4	3	3	2	2	2	3	3	3	4	2	2	1	2	3	3	2	2	2	2	2	2	2	1	2	5	5	5	5	5	5	5	5	5	5	5	5

Source: 11v11.com
A = Away; H = Home; W = Win; D = Draw; L = Loss

==== League table ====
Pos	Team	Pld	W	D	L	GF	GA	GD	Pts	Promotion or relegation
3	Sheffield Wednesday (P)	46	21	16	9	81	47	+34	58	Promotion to the Second Division
4	Chesterfield	46	23	11	12	71	46	+25	57	
5	Colchester United	46	20	12	14	64	56	+8	52	
6	Carlisle United	46	18	12	16	66	56	+10	48	
7	Reading	46	16	16	14	66	65	+1	48	

Source: rsssf.com
(P) Promoted

==== Matches ====
18 August 1979 1	Hull City	0–2	Colchester United	Kingston upon Hull
		Report	Allinson 35'; Hodge 81'	Stadium: Boothferry Park; Attendance: 4,463; Referee: Peter Willis

21 August 1979 2	Colchester United	1–0	Sheffield United	Colchester
	Lee 83'	Report	Cutbush (yellow card) 61' (red card)	Stadium: Layer Road; Attendance: 4,191; Referee: Tom Bune

25 August 1979 3	Rotherham United	3–0	Colchester United	Rotherham
	Finney 9'; Fern 38'; Gwyther 46'	Report		Stadium: Millmoor; Attendance: 3,278; Referee: R Toseland

31 August 1979 4	Colchester United	2–3	Swindon Town	Colchester
	Gough 32'; Hodge 66'	Report	Mayes 26'; Rowland 42', 90'	Stadium: Layer Road; Attendance: 2,784; Referee: Rob Lewis

8 September 1979 5	Chesterfield	3–0	Colchester United	Chesterfield
	Hunter 8'; Birch 73'; Moss 83'	Report	Gough (yellow card) 30' (red card) 32'	Stadium: Saltergate; Attendance: 4,206; Referee: J Sewell

15 September 1979 6	Colchester United	0–0	Sheffield Wednesday	Colchester
		Report		Stadium: Layer Road; Attendance: 3,473; Referee: D Reeves

18 September 1979 7	Colchester United	2–1	Mansfield Town	Colchester
	Gough 23'; Lee 78'	Report	Bird 47'	Stadium: Layer Road; Attendance: 2,346; Referee: K Salmon

22 September 1979 8	Grimsby Town	1–2	Colchester United	Cleethorpes
	Kilmore 27'	Report	Lee 66', 77'	Stadium: Blundell Park; Attendance: 6,962; Referee: T Mills

29 September 1979 9	Colchester United	0–0	Barnsley	Colchester
		Report		Stadium: Layer Road; Attendance: 3,376; Referee: J Martin

1 October 1979 10	Mansfield Town	0–1	Colchester United	Mansfield
		Report	Lee 75'	Stadium: Field Mill; Attendance: 3,500; Referee: J Hough

5 October 1979 11	Colchester United	1–1	Reading	Colchester
	Rowles 43'	Report	Heale	Stadium: Layer Road; Attendance: 3,330; Referee: H Robinson

9 October 1979 12	Sheffield United	1–2	Colchester United	Sheffield
	Bourne 63'	Report	Foley 73'; Gough 77'	Stadium: Bramall Lane; Attendance: 18,712

12 October 1979 13	Southend United	0–1	Colchester United	Southend-on-Sea
		Report	J. Walker 23' (o.g.)	Stadium: Roots Hall; Attendance: 5,944; Referee: T Cox

19 October 1979 14	Colchester United	3–1	Blackpool	Colchester
	Gough 18'; Lee 30'; Hodge 75'	Report	Weston 90'	Stadium: Layer Road; Attendance: 4,383; Referee: C Maskell

23 October 1979 15	Colchester United	4–0	Wimbledon	Colchester
	Hodge 17' (pen.); Lee 19'; Gough 77'; Wignall 86'	Report		Stadium: Layer Road; Attendance: 4,396; Referee: Alan Gunn

27 October 1979 16	Blackburn Rovers	3–0	Colchester United	Blackburn
	Crawford 18'; Keeley 55'; Brotherston 85'	Report		Stadium: Ewood Park; Attendance: 6,436; Referee: J Lovatt

2 November 1979 17	Colchester United	1–1	Hull City	Colchester
	Gough 86'	Report	Moss 36'	Stadium: Layer Road; Attendance: 4,510; Referee: David Hutchinson

6 November 1979 18	Wimbledon	3–3	Colchester United	Wimbledon
	Parsons 12', 18' (pen.); J. Leslie 70'	Report	Wignall 57'; Lee 64'; Gough 80'	Stadium: Plough Lane; Attendance: 2,465; Referee: J Bray

10 November 1979 19	Brentford	1–0	Colchester United	Brentford
15:00 GMT	McNichol 2'; Carlton (red card)	Report		Stadium: Griffin Park; Attendance: 9,060; Referee: T Spencer

16 November 1979 20	Colchester United	5–2	Plymouth Argyle	Colchester
	Lee 5'; Packer 7', 58'; Hodge 23'; Gough 55'	Report	Kemp 42'; Cook 69' (o.g.)	Stadium: Layer Road; Attendance: 3,520; Referee: Alf Grey

1 December 1979 21	Millwall	1–2	Colchester United	New Cross
	Mehmet 56'	Report	Lee 8'; Foley 29'	Stadium: The Den; Attendance: 7,563; Referee: D Letts

7 December 1979 22	Colchester United	1–1	Carlisle United	Colchester
	Lee 16'	Report	Beardsley 76'	Stadium: Layer Road; Attendance: 4,104; Referee: Colin Downey

21 December 1979 23	Exeter City	3–1	Colchester United	Exeter
	Roberts 5'; Dowman 68' (o.g.); Pullar 73'	Report	Wright 17'	Stadium: St James Park; Attendance: 2,648; Referee: W Brombroff

26 December 1979 24	Colchester United	2–2	Gillingham	Colchester
	Packer 7'; Allinson 16'	Report	Overton 50'; Westwood 75'	Stadium: Layer Road; Attendance: 5,145; Referee: B Hill

29 December 1979 25	Colchester United	1–1	Rotherham United	Colchester
	Lee 42'	Report	Gooding 13'	Stadium: Layer Road; Attendance: 3,375; Referee: M Bidmead

8 January 1980 26	Colchester United	1–1	Chester	Colchester
	Wignall 76'	Report	Phillips 54' (pen.)	Stadium: Layer Road; Attendance: 3,251; Referee: Ron Challis

12 January 1980 27	Oxford United	0–2	Colchester United	Oxford
		Report	Foley 32'; Lee 81'	Stadium: Manor Ground; Attendance: 3,857; Referee: Alan Gunn

18 January 1980 28	Colchester United	0–1	Chesterfield	Colchester
		Report	Birch 78'	Stadium: Layer Road; Attendance: 3,763; Referee: D Reeves

29 January 1980 29	Bury	0–1	Colchester United	Bury
		Report	Rowles 30'	Stadium: Gigg Lane; Attendance: 3,551; Referee: P Richardson

2 February 1980 30	Sheffield Wednesday	3–0	Colchester United	Sheffield
	Smith 9' (pen.), 73' (pen.); Curran 25'	Report		Stadium: Hillsborough Stadium; Attendance: 11,958; Referee: George Courtney

8 February 1980 31	Colchester United	2–1	Grimsby Town	Colchester
	Gough 50'; Foley 82'	Report	Dowman 10' (o.g.)	Stadium: Layer Road; Attendance: 5,149; Referee: A Robinson

16 February 1980 32	Barnsley	1–2	Colchester United	Barnsley
	Glavin 83' (pen.)	Report	Dowman 25'; Rowles 30'	Stadium: Oakwell; Attendance: 11,309; Referee: J Sewell

22 February 1980 33	Colchester United	2–1	Southend United	Colchester
	Rowles 44'; Leslie 79'	Report	Spence 38'	Stadium: Layer Road; Attendance: 6,135

29 February 1980 34	Blackpool	1–0	Colchester United	Blackpool
	Kellow 40'	Report		Stadium: Bloomfield Road; Attendance: 5,594; Referee: M Ashley

8 March 1980 35	Colchester United	0–1	Blackburn Rovers	Colchester
		Report	Crawford 24'	Stadium: Layer Road; Attendance: 4,957; Referee: D Hedges

14 March 1980 36	Reading	2–0	Colchester United	Reading
	Joslyn 34'; Sanchez 39'	Report		Stadium: Elm Park; Attendance: 5,444; Referee: G Napthine

22 March 1980 37	Colchester United	6–1	Brentford	Colchester
	Foley 6', 67'; Lee 48', 78'; Dowman 70'; Rowles 87'	Report	Funnell 60'	Stadium: Layer Road; Attendance: 3,818; Referee: P Reeves

29 March 1980 38	Plymouth Argyle	2–0	Colchester United	Plymouth
	Trusson 2', 35'	Report		Stadium: Home Park; Attendance: 4,330; Referee: M Robinson

3 April 1980 39	Colchester United	0–0	Exeter City	Colchester
		Report		Stadium: Layer Road; Attendance: 2,780; Referee: R Toseland

5 April 1980 40	Gillingham	2–2	Colchester United	Gillingham
	Price 1'; Bruce 65'	Report	Lee 44'; Foley 79'	Stadium: Priestfield Stadium; Attendance: 6,561; Referee: T Spencer

7 April 1980 41	Colchester United	2–1	Bury	Colchester
	Gough 34'; Lee 88'	Report	Madden 31'	Stadium: Layer Road; Attendance: 3,190; Referee: M Taylor

12 April 1980 42	Chester	2–1	Colchester United	Chester
	Rush 10', 49'	Report	Foley 6'	Stadium: Sealand Road; Attendance: 2,282; Referee: J Heath

19 April 1980 43	Colchester United	0–0	Millwall	Colchester
		Report		Stadium: Layer Road; Attendance: 3,296; Referee: K Baker

22 April 1980 44	Swindon Town	2–3	Colchester United	Swindon
	McHale 24'; Mayes 57'	Report	Rowles 4'; Harvey 18', 33'	Stadium: County Ground; Attendance: 7,985; Referee: Tom Bune

26 April 1980 45	Carlisle United	2–0	Colchester United	Carlisle
	Bannon 35', 88'	Report		Stadium: Brunton Park; Attendance: 3,702; Referee: P Tyldesley

2 May 1980 46	Colchester United	3–0	Oxford United	Colchester
	Packer 36'; Rowles 47', 59'	Report		Stadium: Layer Road; Attendance: 2,535; Referee: D Richardson

=== League Cup ===
11 August 1979 1st round 1st leg	Colchester United	2–0	Watford	Colchester
	Hodge 39' (pen.); Gough 44'; Dowman (red card) 84'	Report		Stadium: Layer Road; Attendance: 4,368; Referee: B Martin

14 August 1979 1st round 2nd leg	Watford	2–1	Colchester United	Watford
	Bolton 74' (pen.), 78'	Report	Allinson 29'	Stadium: Vicarage Road; Attendance: 10,051
Note: Colchester won 3–2 on aggregate

28 August 1979 2nd round 1st leg	Colchester United	0–2	Aston Villa	Colchester
		Report	Shaw 35', 73'	Stadium: Layer Road; Attendance: 6,221; Referee: B Hill

5 September 1979 2nd round 2nd leg	Aston Villa	0–2 (a.e.t.) (9–8 p)	Colchester United	Birmingham
		Report	Lee 19'; Gough 79'	Stadium: Villa Park; Attendance: 19,475
Note: Match drawn 2–2 on aggregate, Aston Villa won 9–8 on penalties

=== FA Cup ===
24 November 1979 1st round	Colchester United	1–1	Plymouth Argyle	Colchester
	Rowles 28'	Report	Hodges 85'	Stadium: Layer Road; Attendance: 4,064; Referee: M Baker

27 November 1979 1st round replay	Plymouth Argyle	0–1 (a.e.t.)	Colchester United	Plymouth
		Report	Allinson 100'	Stadium: Home Park; Attendance: 6,926; Referee: M Baker

15 December 1979 2nd round	Colchester United	1–0	Bournemouth	Colchester
	Rowles 28'	Report		Stadium: Layer Road; Attendance: 3,693; Referee: R Bridges

5 January 1980 3rd round	Reading	2–0	Colchester United	Reading
	Earles 1'; Heale 86'	Report		Stadium: Elm Park; Attendance: 7,780; Referee: A Glasson

== Squad statistics ==
=== Appearances and goals ===
No.	Pos	Nat	Player	Total		Third Division		FA Cup		League Cup	
No.	Pos	Nat	Player	Apps	Goals	Apps	Goals	Apps	Goals	Apps	Goals
	GK	(Wales) WAL	Mike Walker	54	0	46	0	4	0	4	0
	DF	(England) ENG	Micky Cook	50	0	44	0	4	0	2	0
	DF	(England) ENG	Steve Dowman	45	2	37	2	4	0	3+1	0
	DF	(England) ENG	Mick Packer	49	4	43	4	4	0	2	0
	DF	(England) ENG	Steve Wignall	46	3	40	3	2	0	4	0
	DF	(England) ENG	Steve Wright	33	1	23+3	1	3+1	0	3	0
	MF	(England) ENG	Russell Cotton	4	0	4	0	0	0	0	0
	MF	(England) ENG	Tony Evans	6	0	2+4	0	0	0	0	0
	MF	(England) ENG	Steve Foley	50	8	42	8	4	0	4	0
	MF	(England) ENG	Steve Leslie	54	1	46	1	4	0	4	0
	MF	(England) ENG	Eddie Rowles	39	10	26+8	8	2+1	2	2	0
	FW	(England) ENG	Ian Allinson	46	4	37+1	2	3+1	1	4	1
	FW	(England) ENG	Bobby Gough	39	12	31+1	10	3	0	4	2
	FW	(England) ENG	Gary Harvey	4	2	4	2	0	0	0	0
	FW	(England) ENG	Bobby Hodge	44	6	34+3	5	3	0	4	1
	FW	(England) ENG	Trevor Lee	51	18	43	17	4	0	4	1
Players who appeared for Colchester who left during the season
	MF	(England) ENG	Ray Bunkell	1	0	1	0	0	0	0	0
	MF	(England) ENG	Paul Dyer	4	0	3+1	0	0	0	0	0

=== Goalscorers ===
Place	Nationality	Position	Name	Third Division	FA Cup	League Cup	Total
1	(England)	FW	Trevor Lee	17	0	1	18
2	(England)	FW	Bobby Gough	10	0	2	12
3	(England)	MF	Eddie Rowles	8	2	0	10
4	(England)	MF	Steve Foley	8	0	0	8
5	(England)	WG	Bobby Hodge	5	0	1	6
6	(England)	WG	Ian Allinson	2	1	1	4
6	(England)	FB	Mick Packer	4	0	0	4
8	(England)	CB	Steve Wignall	3	0	0	3
9	(England)	CB	Steve Dowman	2	0	0	2
9	(England)	FW	Gary Harvey	2	0	0	2
11	(England)	MF	Steve Leslie	1	0	0	1
11	(England)	CB	Steve Wright	1	0	0	1
			Own goals	1	0	0	1
			TOTALS	64	3	5	72

=== Disciplinary record ===
Nationality	Position	Name	Third Division		FA Cup		League Cup		Total	
Nationality	Position	Name	Yellow card	Red card	Yellow card	Red card	Yellow card	Red card	Yellow card	Red card
(England)	FW	Bobby Gough	1	1	0	0	0	0	1	1
(England)	CB	Steve Dowman	0	0	0	0	0	1	0	1
(England)	FB	Micky Cook	1	0	0	0	0	0	1	0
(England)	CB	Steve Wignall	1	0	0	0	0	0	1	0
		TOTALS	3	1	0	0	0	1	3	2

=== Clean sheets ===
Number of games goalkeepers kept a clean sheet.

Place	Nationality	Player	Third Division	FA Cup	League Cup	Total
1	(Wales)	Mike Walker	12	2	2	16
		TOTALS	12	2	2	16

=== Player debuts ===
Players making their first-team Colchester United debut in a fully competitive match.

Position	Nationality	Player	Date	Opponent	Ground	Notes
FW	(England)	Gary Harvey	19 April 1980	Millwall	Layer Road	

== See also ==
- List of Colchester United F.C. seasons
