= John Froggatt =

English footballer and manager (1945–2025)

Personal information
- Full name: John Lawrence Froggatt
- Date of birth: 13 December 1945
- Place of birth: Stanton Hill, England
- Date of death: 23 May 2025 (aged 79)
- Height: 5 ft 11 in (1.80 m)
- Position: Forward

Youth career
- 1962–1963: East Kirkby Colliery

Senior career*
Years	Team	Apps	(Gls)
1963–1965	Notts County	4	(0)
1965–1968	Ilkeston Town		
1968–1969	Buxton		
1969–1974	Boston United	190	(83)
1974–1978	Colchester United	155	(29)
1978	Port Vale	14	(3)
1978–1979	Northampton Town	42	(13)
1979–1980	Boston United	29	(4)
Total		434	(132)

Managerial career
- 1981–1984: Boston United
- 1986–1988: Ilkeston Town
- * Club domestic league appearances and goals

John Lawrence Froggatt (13 December 1945 – 23 May 2025) was an English footballer and manager. A forward, he scored 45 goals in 215 league games in seven seasons in the Football League.

Froggatt began his career at Notts County in 1963. He later played for Ilkeston Town and Buxton before coming to prominence with Boston United between 1969 and 1974. After finishing as Northern Premier League runners-up in 1971–72, they won the league title in 1972–73 and 1973–74. In August 1974, he was signed by Colchester United for a £6,000 fee. Crowned the club's Player of the Year in 1975, he helped the club to win promotion out of the Fourth Division in 1976–77. He was signed by Port Vale for £10,000 in February 1978 before being sold to Northampton Town for £8,000 seven months later. He returned to Boston United the following year and managed the club in three Alliance Premier League campaigns between 1981 and 1984. He later spent two years in charge at Ilkeston Town.

== Playing career ==
=== Early career ===
Froggatt played for non-League East Kirkby Colliery before joining Notts County in 1963. He had previously had trials with Aston Villa and Nottingham Forest. He made his first-team debut against Bristol Rovers and played four league games during the relegation season of 1963–64 and subsequent Fourth Division campaign in 1964–65. He dropped out of the Football League to work as a painter and decorator and play part-time for Ilkeston Town and Buxton in the Midland League, before joining Northern Premier League side Boston United in 1969 for a £500 fee. They finished third, two points short of the title, in 1969–70; fourth in 1970–71; second in 1971–72, two points behind champions Stafford Rangers; first in 1972–73 by a nine points margin; and first again in 1973–74 under manager Keith Jobling.

=== Colchester United ===
Froggatt transferred to Third Division club Colchester United in August 1974 for a £6,000 fee, joining former Boston strike partner Bobby Svarc and former Boston manager Jim Smith at Layer Road. He scored his first Football League goal on 24 August, in a 3–2 defeat by Blackburn Rovers at Ewood Park. He and Svarc continued their strike partnership. Froggatt scored a hat-trick past Grimsby Town on 15 November, whilst Svarc also scored a brace. He also found the net against Aston Villa in a 2–1 defeat in the League Cup quarter-finals. He started every league game in 1974–75, scoring 18 goals in 54 games in all competitions; Svarc scored 25 to take their partnership to 43 goals for the season. Froggatt was voted the club's Player of the Year.

Svarc and Smith left the club in the summer of 1975, leaving Froggatt behind at Colchester. The club were relegated under rookie manager Bobby Roberts, and Froggatt scored just five goals from 44 games in 1975–76; this left new signings Bobby Gough and Colin Garwood to pick up the slack. However, Roberts led the "U's" to immediate promotion in 1976–77; Frogratt scored eight goals in 52 appearances, though again Garwood and Gough got the bulk of the goals. He spent time out of the first-team, though he still added four goals in 34 games in 1977–78 to take his tally for Colchester to 35 goals in 184 games in league and cup competitions.

=== Later career ===
Froggatt was signed by Port Vale manager Bobby Smith for £10,000 in February 1978. 15 seconds into his Vale debut; a 4–0 win over Exeter City on 8 February 1978 at Vale Park, and he had scored his first goal for the club. Despite this, he tweaked his hamstring the following month and only scored two more goals in eleven further league games in 1977–78 as the "Valiants" were relegated into the basement division. He then lost his first-team place to Ken Beamish and Bernie Wright, and after three appearances under new manager Dennis Butler in 1978–79, Froggatt was sold to Northampton Town for £8,000 in September 1978. He scored three times for the struggling "Cobblers", including on his debut. He returned to Boston United, where he was made assistant manager.

== Style of play ==
Froggatt was a target man forward who boasted good pace and ball-control skills.

== Managerial career ==
Froggatt was appointed manager at Alliance Premier League club Boston United in 1981. Under his stewardship, the "Pilgrims" finished tenth in 1981–82, fifth in 1982–83, and 17th in 1983–84. He went on to manage Central Midlands League side Ilkeston Town between September 1986 and January 1988.

== Personal life and death ==
Froggatt's wife gave birth to twins in 1985. He later worked as a company director.

Froggatt died on 23 May 2025, at the age of 79.

== Career statistics ==
Appearances and goals by club, season and competition
Club	Season	League			FA Cup		Other		Total	
Club	Season	Division	Apps	Goals	Apps	Goals	Apps	Goals	Apps	Goals
Notts County	1963–64	Third Division	2	0	0	0	0	0	2	0
Notts County	1964–65	Fourth Division	2	0	0	0	1	1	3	1
Notts County	Total		4	0	0	0	1	1	5	1
Boston United	1969–70	Northern Premier League	25	8	0	0	10	7	35	15
Boston United	1970–71	Northern Premier League	29	15	6	3	15	5	50	23
Boston United	1971–72	Northern Premier League	45	25	4	1	10	5	59	31
Boston United	1972–73	Northern Premier League	45	17	2	1	6	2	53	20
Boston United	1973–74	Northern Premier League	46	18	6	1	10	6	62	25
Boston United	Total		190	83	18	6	51	25	259	114
Colchester United	1974–75	Third Division	46	16	2	1	6	1	54	18
Colchester United	1975–76	Third Division	41	5	1	0	2	0	44	5
Colchester United	1976–77	Fourth Division	43	6	6	2	3	0	52	8
Colchester United	1977–78	Third Division	25	2	4	0	5	2	34	4
Colchester United	Total		155	29	13	3	16	3	184	35
Port Vale	1977–78	Third Division	12	3	0	0	0	0	12	3
Port Vale	1978–79	Fourth Division	2	0	0	0	1	0	3	0
Port Vale	Total		14	3	0	0	1	0	15	3
Northampton Town	1978–79	Fourth Division	42	13	1	0	0	0	43	13
Boston United	1979–80	Alliance Premier League	29	4	4	1	10	0	43	5
Career total			434	132	36	10	79	29	549	171

== Honours ==
Individual

- Colchester United F.C. Player of the Year: 1975

Boston United

- Northern Premier League: 1972–73 & 1973–74

Colchester United

- Football League Fourth Division third-place promotion: 1976–77
