= List of Colchester United F.C. seasons =

Colchester United Football Club is an English professional football club based in Colchester, Essex, that was founded in 1937.

Colchester United competed in the Southern Football League from 1937 until 1950, when they were elected to the Football League. During this time, Colchester produced one of the most notable FA Cup runs by a non-league side in 1947–48, as they defeated fellow non-leaguers Banbury Spencer in the first round, before beating Football League clubs Wrexham, Huddersfield Town and Bradford Park Avenue. They finally fell to Blackpool in the fifth round.

Colchester played in the Third Division South for eight seasons, until the league was re-organised at the end of the 1957–58 season. They finished in 12th position in the table that year, meaning that from the 1958–59 season, the U's would play in the Third Division. Colchester remained in the Third Division until they were relegated in 1961, but made an immediate return to the third tier when they finished the 1961–62 season in second position, one point behind champions Millwall.

Three years later, the club finished 23rd of 24 clubs in the Third Division, as they were relegated back to the Fourth Division. Another single season in the fourth tier followed as Colchester were promoted in fourth position. Their spell in the Third Division was brief, as they were once again relegated in 1968.

The U's remained in the Fourth Division for a further six seasons, but during this period, they embarked on one of the most notable runs in FA Cup history. Manager Dick Graham took his ageing side to the 1970–71 quarter-finals. They dispatched non-league side Ringmer in the first round, before knocking-out Cambridge United, Barnet and Rochdale following a replay. United faced Don Revie's formidable Leeds United side in the fifth round, who were at the top of the First Division at the time. The U's raced to an unprecedented 3–0 lead in the match, before Leeds pulled two goals back. The match ended 3–2 to Colchester to record a famous giant-killing victory. The U's then faced Everton in the quarter-final but lost 5–0 at Goodison Park. Three seasons later, Colchester sealed promotion again as they ended the 1973–74 season in third place.

Relegation from the Third Division followed in 1976, with promotion again following one season later. Colchester returned to the Fourth Division for the final time in 1981 as they finished 22nd of 24 teams. Colchester struggled financially in the late 1980s and suffered a significant drop in form, resulting in the club finishing bottom of the entire Football League in 1990 and as such were relegated to the Conference.

Colchester returned to the Football League at the second attempt, finishing second to Barnet in 1990–91, before beating Wycombe Wanderers to the title in 1991–92. The club completed a league and cup double as they lifted the FA Trophy. Now in the recently renamed Division Three, Colchester earned a play-off spot in the 1995–96 season, but lost in the semi-finals to Plymouth Argyle. The U's reached Wembley for the first time for the 1997 Football League Trophy Final, but were defeated on penalties by Carlisle United.

Colchester did achieve Wembley success the following season as they beat Torquay United 1–0 in the 1998 Football League Third Division play-off final. The club consolidated their position in the third tier for a number of seasons, before they achieved another feat in earning promotion to the Championship in 2006 by finishing in second position to Southend United. Colchester then finished in 10th position in the Championship, their highest-ever league finish. However, the following season, they were relegated back to League One.

Following relegation from the Championship, Colchester remained in League One for eight seasons. Initially the club fought for the play-off positions, but began to struggle in the lower reaches of the league by the 2012–13 season, narrowly avoiding relegation that year. Colchester were relegated from League One to the fourth tier of English football for the first time in 18 years at the end of the 2015–16 season.

In League Two, Colchester were competitive, finishing in the top-half of the table regularly. The club reached the 2019–20 play-offs, but were eliminated in the semi-finals by Exeter City. The following season, Colchester struggled amidst the constraints of the COVID-19 pandemic, only securing their League Two status in the penultimate game of the season.

Since their formation in 1937, as of the 2021–22 season, Colchester United have spent two seasons in the second tier of English football, 37 seasons in the third tier, 30 seasons in the fourth tier and two seasons in the Football Conference. Prior to their 1950 election to the Football League, Colchester spent seven seasons in the Southern League. The table below details Colchester United's in all senior first-team competitions from the 1937–38 season to the end of the most recently completed season.

== Key ==
Key to league record:

- P – Played
- W – Games won
- D – Games drawn
- L – Games lost
- F – Goals for
- A – Goals against
- Pts – Points
- Pos – Final position

Key to colours and symbols:

W	Winners
	Runners-up
	Promoted
	Relegated
	Reached play-offs

Key to divisions:

- CHA – Championship
- CON – Conference
- D2 – Second Division
- D3 – Third Division
- D3S – Third Division South
- D4 – Fourth Division
- L1 – League One
- L2 – League Two
- SFL – Southern League

Key to cups:

- Comp – Competition played
- SLC – Southern League Cup
- WC – Watney Cup
- AMC/FLT/EFLT – Associate Members' Cup/Football League Trophy/EFL Trophy
- BLT – Bob Lord Trophy
- FAT – FA Trophy

Key to rounds:

- 4QR – Fourth qualifying round
- GS – Group stage
- R1 – First round, etc.
- RO16 — Round Of 16
- QF – Quarter-finals
- SF – Semi-finals
- F – Finals
- W – Winners
- (S) – Southern section
- DNE – Did not enter

Details of abandoned competitions are shown in italics and appropriately footnoted.

== Seasons ==
Season	League									FA Cup	League Cup	Other		Top goalscorer (Note: Includes goals scored in the Southern League, the Football League (including play-offs), Conference, FA Cup, League Cup, Associate Members' Cup/Football League Trophy/EFL Trophy, FA Trophy, Bob Lord Trophy, Southern League Cup and Watney Cup.)		Average attendance (Note: Includes home attendances recorded in the Southern League, the Football League (including play-offs), Conference, FA Cup, League Cup, Associate Members' Cup/Football League Trophy/EFL Trophy, FA Trophy, Bob Lord Trophy, Southern League Cup and Watney Cup.)
Season	Division	P	W	D	L	F	A	Pts	Pos	FA Cup	League Cup	Comp	Result	Name	Goals	Average attendance
1937–38	SFL	34	15	8	11	90	58	38	6/18	DNE	–	SLC	W	(Scotland) Alec Cheyne	33	5,167
1938–39	SFL	44	31	5	8	110	37	67	1/23	R1	–	SLC	SF	(Wales) Arthur Pritchard	44	8,307
1939–40	SFL	3	1	1	1	4	3	3	N/A	N/A	–	–	–	(England) Len Astill (England) Joe Birch (Scotland) Alec Cheyne (England) George Law	2	4,200
No competitive football was played between 1939 and 1945 due to the Second World War
1945–46	SFL	20	7	3	10	29	47	17	8/11	4QR	–	–	–	(England) Bob Hodgson	5	3,858
1946–47	SFL	31	15	4	12	65	60	35	8/17	R1	–	SLC	SF	(England) Arthur Turner	24	6,218
1947–48	SFL	34	17	10	7	88	41	44	4/17	R5	–	SLC	F	(England) Bob Curry	30	9,231
1948–49	SFL	42	21	10	11	94	61	52	4/22	R1	–	SLC	F	(England) Arthur Turner	24	8,476
1949–50	SFL	46	31	9	6	109	51	71	2/24	4QR	–	SLC	W	(England) Vic Keeble	42	8,639
1950–51	D3S	46	14	12	20	63	76	40	16/24	R1	–	–	–	(England) Bob Curry	15	10,571
1951–52	D3S	46	17	12	17	56	77	46	10/24	R3	–	–	–	(England) Vic Keeble	17	9,429
1952–53	D3S	46	12	14	20	59	76	38	22/24	R3	–	–	–	(England) Kevin McCurley	18	8,002
1953–54	D3S	46	10	10	26	50	78	30	23/24	R1	–	–	–	(England) Bert Barlow	10	7,797
1954–55	D3S	46	9	13	24	53	91	31	24/24	R1	–	–	–	(England) Ken Plant	13	7,284
1955–56	D3S	46	18	11	17	76	81	47	12/24	R1	–	–	–	(England) Kevin McCurley	29	7,668
1956–57	D3S	46	22	14	10	84	56	58	3/24	R1	–	–	–	(England) Ken Plant	24	9,351
1957–58	D3S	46	17	13	16	77	79	47	12/24	R1	–	–	–	(England) Ken Plant	19	10,891
1958–59	D3	46	21	10	15	71	67	52	5/24	R4	–	–	–	(England) Neil Langman	26	8,357
1959–60	D3	46	18	11	17	83	74	47	9/24	R1	–	–	–	(England) Martyn King	30	7,856
1960–61	D3	46	11	11	24	68	101	33	23/24	R2	R2	–	–	(England) Martyn King	25	5,203
1961–62	D4	46	23	9	12	104	71	55	2/24	R1	R1	–	–	(England) Bobby Hunt	40	5,532
1962–63	D3	46	18	11	17	73	93	47	12/24	R1	R2	–	–	(England) Martyn King	27	5,313
1963–64	D3	46	12	19	15	70	68	43	17/24	R3	R2	–	–	(England) Bobby Hunt	24	5,242
1964–65	D3	46	10	10	26	50	89	30	23/24	R2	R1	–	–	(Scotland) Billy Stark	14	3,634
1965–66	D4	46	23	10	13	70	47	56	4/24	R1	R2	–	–	(England) Reg Stratton	21	5,225
1966–67	D3	46	17	10	19	76	73	44	13/24	R2	R1	–	–	(England) Reg Stratton	24	5,714
1967–68	D3	46	9	15	22	50	87	33	23/24	R3	R1	–	–	(England) Reg Stratton	11	4,591
1968–69	D4	46	20	12	14	57	53	52	6/24	R2	R2	–	–	(England) Danny Light	14	6,048
1969–70	D4	46	17	14	15	64	63	48	10/24	R1	R2	–	–	(England) Ken Jones	16	4,664
1970–71	D4	46	21	12	13	70	54	54	6/24	QF	R2	–	–	(England) Ray Crawford	31	6,362
1971–72	D4	46	19	10	17	70	69	48	11/24	R1	R3	WC	W	(England) Brian Lewis	22	5,695
1972–73	D4	46	10	11	25	48	76	31	22/24	R2	R1	–	–	(England) Mick Mahon	12	3,440
1973–74	D4	46	24	12	10	73	36	60	3/24	R1	R1	–	–	(England) Bobby Svarc	26	5,601
1974–75	D3	46	17	13	16	70	63	47	11/24	R2	QF	–	–	(England) Bobby Svarc	25	5,460
1975–76	D3	46	12	14	20	41	65	38	22/24	R1	R1	–	–	(England) Steve Foley	7	3,385
1976–77	D4	46	25	9	12	77	43	59	3/24	R4	R1	–	–	(England) Colin Garwood	24	4,944
1977–78	D3	46	15	18	13	55	44	48	8/24	R2	R3	–	–	(England) Bobby Gough	17	4,566
1978–79	D3	46	17	17	12	60	55	51	7/24	R5	R1	–	–	(England) Bobby Gough	22	3,921
1979–80	D3	46	20	12	14	64	56	52	5/24	R3	R2	–	–	(England) Trevor Lee	18	3,932
1980–81	D3	46	14	11	21	45	65	39	22/24	R3	R1	–	–	(Scotland) Kevin Bremner	10	2,956
1981–82	D4	46	20	12	14	82	57	72	6/24	R3	R3	–	–	(England) Ian Allinson	26	3,161
1982–83	D4	46	24	9	13	75	55	81	6/24	R1	R2	–	–	(England) Ian Allinson	26	2,690
1983–84	D4	46	17	16	13	69	53	67	8/24	R3	R3	AMC	R2 (S)	(England) Tony Adcock	33	2,847
1984–85	D4	46	20	14	12	87	65	74	7/24	R2	R1	AMC	R2 (S)	(England) Tony Adcock	28	2,225
1985–86	D4	46	19	13	14	88	63	70	6/24	R1	R1	AMC	R1 (S)	(England) Tony Adcock	16	2,253
1986–87	D4	46	21	7	18	64	56	70	5/24	R2	R1	AMC	R1 (S)	(England) Tony Adcock (England) Tommy English	12	2,753
1987–88	D4	46	19	10	17	47	51	67	9/24	R3	R1	AMC	R2 (S)	(England) Dale Tempest	14	1,776
1988–89	D4	46	12	14	20	60	78	50	22/24	R4	R1	AMC	QF (S)	(England) Mario Walsh	15	2,871
1989–90	D4	46	11	10	25	48	75	43	24/24	R2	R1	AMC	R1 (S)	(England) Trevor Morgan	12	3,139
1990–91	CON	42	25	10	7	68	35	85	2/22	R2	–	BLT FAT	R2 R4	(England) Mario Walsh	18	3,196
1991–92	CON	42	28	10	4	98	40	94	1/22	R1	–	BLT FAT	R2 W	(England) Roy McDonough	29	3,381
1992–93	D3	42	18	5	19	67	76	59	10/22	R2	R1	FLT	R1 (S)	(England) Gary Bennett (England) Steve McGavin	10	3,768
1993–94	D3	42	13	10	19	56	71	49	17/22	R1	R1	FLT	R3 (S)	(England) Steve Brown	13	2,833
1994–95	D3	42	16	10	16	56	64	58	10/22	R3	R1	FLT	R1 (S)	(England) Steve Whitton	13	3,201
1995–96	D3	46	18	18	10	61	51	72	7/24	R1	R1	FLT	R3 (S)	(England) Tony Adcock	17	3,299
1996–97	D3	46	17	17	12	62	51	68	8/24	R1	R2	FLT	F	(England) Tony Adcock	14	3,422
1997–98	D3	46	21	11	14	72	60	74	4/24	R2	R1	FLT	R1 (S)	(England) David Gregory	10	3,267
1998–99	D2	46	12	16	18	52	70	52	18/24	R1	R1	FLT	R1 (S)	(England) David Gregory	14	4,303
1999–2000	D2	46	14	10	22	59	82	52	18/24	R1	R1	FLT	R1 (S)	(England) Steve McGavin	16	3,801
2000–01	D2	46	15	12	19	55	59	57	17/24	R1	R2	FLT	R1 (S)	(England) Mick Stockwell	11	3,466
2001–02	D2	46	15	12	19	65	77	57	15/24	R1	R2	FLT	R2 (S)	(England) Scott McGleish	16	3,705
2002–03	D2	46	14	16	16	52	56	58	12/24	R1	R1	FLT	R1 (S)	(England) Joe Keith (England) Scott McGleish	9	3,367
2003–04	D2	46	17	13	16	52	56	64	11/24	R5	R2	FLT	F (S)	(England) Scott McGleish	17	3,730
2004–05	L1	46	14	17	15	60	50	59	15/24	R4	R3	FLT	R1 (S)	(England) Craig Fagan	14	3,481
2005–06	L1	46	22	13	11	58	40	79	2/24	R5	R1	FLT	F (S)	(Scotland) Chris Iwelumo	19	3,843
2006–07	CHA	46	20	9	17	70	56	69	10/24	R3	R1	–	–	(England) Jamie Cureton	24	5,466
2007–08	CHA	46	7	17	22	62	86	38	24/24	R3	R1	–	–	(Jamaica) Kevin Lisbie	17	5,446
2008–09	L1	46	18	9	19	58	58	63	12/24	R1	R2	FLT	SF (S)	(Republic of Ireland) Mark Yeates	13	5,076
2009–10	L1	46	20	12	14	64	52	72	8/24	R3	R1	FLT	R1 (S)	(Jamaica) Kevin Lisbie	13	5,437
2010–11	L1	46	16	14	16	57	63	62	10/24	R3	R2	FLT	R2 (S)	(Republic of Ireland) Dave Mooney	14	4,071
2011–12	L1	46	13	20	13	61	66	59	10/24	R2	R1	FLT	R1 (S)	(England) Anthony Wordsworth	13	3,747
2012–13	L1	46	14	9	23	47	68	51	20/24	R1	R1	FLT	R2 (S)	(England) Jabo Ibehre (England) Freddie Sears	8	3,530
2013–14	L1	46	13	14	19	53	61	53	16/24	R1	R1	FLT	R1 (S)	(England) Freddie Sears	12	3,631
2014–15	L1	46	14	10	22	58	77	52	19/24	R3	R1	FLT	R2 (S)	(England) Freddie Sears	14	3,704
2015–16	L1	46	9	13	24	57	99	40	23/24	R4	R1	FLT	R1 (S)	(England) George Moncur	14	4,299
2016–17	L2	46	19	12	15	67	57	69	8/24	R1	R1	EFLT	GS (S)	(England) Chris Porter	16	3,974
2017–18	L2	46	16	14	16	53	52	62	13/24	R1	R1	EFLT	GS (S)	(England) Sammie Szmodics	13	3,185
2018–19	L2	46	20	10	16	65	53	70	8/24	R1	R1	EFLT	GS (S)	(England) Sammie Szmodics	15	3,361
2019–20 (Note: Due to the COVID-19 pandemic, on 15 May 2020, EFL clubs voted to end the season with immediate effect with the final table being determined on a points-per-game basis. The play-offs were played as normal.)	L2	37	15	13	9	52	37	58	6/24	R1	QF	EFLT	R2 (S)	(Jamaica) Theo Robinson	12	3,606
2020–21	L2	46	11	18	17	44	61	51	20/24	R1	R1	EFLT	GS (S)	(Jamaica) Jevani Brown	11	1,047* (Note: Due to the COVID-19 pandemic restrictions, fans attended only two games during the course of the season at a reduced capacity.)
2021–22	L2	46	14	13	19	48	60	55	15/24	R2	R1	EFLT	R3	(England) Freddie Sears	8	2,813
2022–23	L2	46	12	13	21	43	51	49	20/24	R1	R2	EFLT	R2	(England) Noah Chilvers	9	3,586
2023–24	L2	46	11	12	23	59	80	45	22/24	R1	R1	EFLT	R2	(Wales) Joe Taylor	11	4,177
2024–25	L2	46	16	19	11	52	47	67	10/24	R1	R2	EFLT	RO16	(Montserrat) Lyle Taylor	10	4,998
