= Bobby Gough =

English footballer (born 1949)

Personal information
- Full name: Robert George Gough
- Date of birth: 20 June 1949 (age 77)
- Place of birth: Birmingham, England
- Height: 5 ft 7 in (1.70 m)
- Position: Forward

Youth career
- Birmingham City

Senior career*
Years	Team	Apps	(Gls)
1966–1968	Walsall	1	(0)
1968–1974	Port Vale	210	(33)
1973–1974	→ Stockport County (loan)	6	(0)
1974–1976	Southport	61	(16)
1976–1981	Colchester United	196	(65)
1981–1982	Hendon	25	(10)
1982–198?	Chelmsford City		
Total		499	(124)
- * Club domestic league appearances and goals

Robert George Gough (born 20 July 1949) is an English former footballer who played as a forward. In a 15-year professional career in the English Football League, he scored 114 goals in 474 league appearances.

After failing to make an impression at Birmingham City and Walsall, he made his name at Port Vale between 1968 and 1974, making a total of 229 appearances for the "Valiants". During this time, he helped the club to win promotion out of the Fourth Division in the 1969–70 season. Following a loan spell at Stockport County, he transferred to Southport in 1974, before arriving at Colchester United two years later. He helped Colchester out of the Fourth Division in 1976–77 and scored a total of 80 goals in 232 games before he departed for non-League Hendon in 1981. He later turned out for Chelmsford City before he left football for the building trade.

== Career ==
=== Early career ===
Gough was a Birmingham City youth player but was not offered a professional contract with the club due to his small stature. He then went on to join Third Division side Walsall in 1966, but only made one league appearance for the club.

=== Port Vale ===
He joined Port Vale in June 1968, when they were then in the Fourth Division. He was one of manager Gordon Lee's first signings. He scored his first senior goal on 16 September in a 3–0 win over York City at Vale Park. He added to his tally with a goal against Exeter City and also scored in both legs of Vale's FA Cup win over Shrewsbury Town. He finished the 1968–69 campaign with four goals in 42 games.

He was more prolific in the 1969–70 season, scoring nine goals in 45 league games to help the club achieve promotion in fourth place. The most notable of these goals was a 35 yards (32 m) effort that helped Vale to a 3–2 win at Oldham Athletic on 13 September; The Sentinel reporter Chris Harper noted that "Gough can certainly hit a ball". He coped well in the Third Division, and scored a hat-trick at the Gay Meadow on 12 September, in what finished as a 7–3 defeat for the "Valiants". By the end of the 1970–71 campaign, he shot eight goals in 37 games, including a goal against fallen giants Aston Villa. He finished the 1971–72 season as the club's top scorer with ten goals in 47 appearances after forming an effective strike partnership with Sammy Morgan.

However, in 1972–73, he was limited to two goals in 29 games, hitting the net in easy wins over Southend United and Rotherham United. Instead, Ray Williams and Sammy Morgan were forming an impressive attacking partnership, scoring 22 goals between them. Gough was dropped in November 1973 and went out on a one-month loan to struggling Fourth Division side Stockport County in December but failed to score in six appearances. He asked to leave Vale to sort out some personal problems but was persuaded to stay by new manager Roy Sproson. He scored his final goal for the Vale against Southport on 2 March 1974. He finished the 1973–74 campaign with two goals in 26 games for Vale and six games for Stockport County. In May 1974, he was allowed to join Southport on a free transfer. He made 229 appearances (210 in the league) and scored 35 goals (33 in the league) for the Vale.

=== Southport ===
Southport were starting their 1974–75 campaign in the Fourth Division, having suffered relegation out of the Third Division. The club entered free-fall and had to apply for re-election at the end of 1975–76, having finished second-from-bottom in the Football League. Gough managed 16 goals in 61 league appearances for the club in his two seasons before he joined Colchester United for a £7,000 fee in January 1976.

=== Colchester United ===
Bobby Roberts's Colchester United lost their third tier status at the end of 1975–76, despite Gough scoring five goals in 22 games during the second half of the season. Colchester won promotion out of the Fourth Division in third-place in 1976–77, with Gough scoring 19 goals in 52 games – five short of strike partner Colin Garwood. The U's consolidated their Third Division status with an eighth-place finish in 1977–78. Gough finished as the club's top-scorer with 17 goals in 51 games. Garwood's tally of 13 strikes meant the pair combined to bring the U's thirty goals throughout the campaign.

United finished seventh in 1978–79, and Gough was again the club's top-scorer with 22 goals in fifty appearances. In the FA Cup, he scored a hat-trick against Oxford United, two against Leatherhead and the winning goal against Newport County to bring Colchester a fifth round tie with Manchester United – which the "Red Devils" won 1–0.

Colchester finished fifth in 1979–80; Gough scored twelve goals in 32 games, some six behind strike partner Trevor Lee. The club suffered relegation at the end of the 1980–81 campaign after finishing two points below the safety of Walsall. Gough spent much of the season out of the first-team, and made just 18 appearances, scoring five goals, as Kevin Bremner was preferred to partner Lee up front. Gough sustained an ankle injury and left the club for Hendon at the end of the campaign, having scored a total of 80 goals (65 in the league) in 232 games (196 in the league).

=== Later career ===
Gough later turned out for non-League side Hendon (Isthmian League Premier Division) and Chelmsford City.

== Later life ==
After hanging up his boots, Gough worked as a sports master at a college, bought a public house, then a restaurant, and worked builder in Essex. He also coached at former club Colchester United. His son, John, was signed to Colchester United and played cricket for Essex County Cricket Club.

== Career statistics ==
Appearances and goals by club, season and competition
Club	Season	League			FA Cup		Other		Total	
Club	Season	Division	Apps	Goals	Apps	Goals	Apps	Goals	Apps	Goals
Walsall	1966–67	Third Division	1	0	0	0	0	0	1	0
Port Vale	1968–69	Fourth Division	36	2	5	2	1	0	42	4
Port Vale	1969–70	Fourth Division	45	9	2	0	1	0	48	9
Port Vale	1970–71	Third Division	36	8	1	0	0	0	37	8
Port Vale	1971–72	Third Division	42	10	4	0	1	0	47	10
Port Vale	1972–73	Third Division	27	2	2	0	0	0	29	2
Port Vale	1973–74	Third Division	24	2	1	0	1	0	26	2
Port Vale	Total		210	33	15	2	4	0	229	35
Stockport County (loan)	1973–74	Fourth Division	6	0	0	0	0	0	6	0
Southport	1974–75	Fourth Division	40	10	0	0	1	0	41	10
Southport	1975–76	Fourth Division	21	6	1	0	2	2	24	8
Southport	Total		61	16	1	0	3	2	65	18
Colchester United	1975–76	Third Division	22	5	0	0	0	0	22	5
Colchester United	1976–77	Fourth Division	43	17	6	1	3	1	52	19
Colchester United	1977–78	Third Division	42	13	4	1	5	3	51	17
Colchester United	1978–79	Third Division	42	16	6	6	2	0	50	22
Colchester United	1979–80	Third Division	32	10	3	0	4	2	39	12
Colchester United	1980–81	Third Division	15	4	2	0	1	1	18	5
Colchester United	Total		196	65	21	8	15	7	232	80
Hendon	1980–81	Isthmian League Premier Division	6	3	0	0	0	0	6	3
Hendon	1981–82	Isthmian League Premier Division	19	7	0	0	15	7	34	14
Hendon	Total		25	10	0	0	15	7	40	17
Career total			499	124	37	10	37	16	573	150

== Honours ==
Port Vale

- Football League Fourth Division 4th-place promotion: 1969–70

Colchester United

- Football League Fourth Division 3rd-place promotion: 1976–77
