= Pat Lally =

Pat Lally may refer to:

- Pat Lally (footballer) (born 1952), English footballer
- Pat Lally (politician) (1926–2018), Scottish politician
