= Ian Allinson =

English footballer (born 1957)

Personal information
- Full name: Ian James Robert Allinson
- Date of birth: 1 October 1957 (age 69)
- Place of birth: Hitchin, England
- Height: 5 ft 10 in (1.78 m)
- Position: Winger

Youth career
- 1974–1975: Colchester United

Senior career*
Years	Team	Apps	(Gls)
1975–1983	Colchester United	308	(69)
1983–1987	Arsenal	83	(16)
1987	Stoke City	9	(0)
1987–1988	Luton Town	32	(3)
1988–1989	Colchester United	38	(10)
1989–1992	Baldock Town		
Total		470	(98)

Managerial career
- 1989–1992: Baldock Town
- 1992–1994: Stotfold
- 1994: Corby Town
- 1994–1998: Stotfold
- 1999–2000: Barton Rovers
- 2000–2001: Harlow Town
- 2001–2003: Barton Rovers
- 2004–2005: Boreham Wood
- 2005–2006: Stotfold
- 2006–2008: Stotfold
- 2008–2015: Boreham Wood
- 2016–2022: St Albans City
- * Club domestic league appearances and goals

Ian James Robert Allinson (born 1 October 1957) is an English football manager and former player.

In his playing career, Allinson amassed over 300 league appearances for Colchester United in two spells, and played over 100 games in all competitions for Arsenal. He also appeared for Stoke City and Luton Town. During his managerial career, he has managed a number of non-league teams, including Baldock Town, Barton Rovers over two spells, Harlow Town, Stotfold, St Albans City over two spells and has had a previous stint with Boreham Wood.

== Playing career ==
Born in Hitchin, Allinson began his career with Colchester United as an apprentice in the summer of 1974 and made his debut later in the season, coming on as a substitute for Jimmy Lindsay against Bobby Charlton's Preston North End on 19 April 1975. The match at Layer Road resulted in a 2–2 draw. After picking up the club's 'Young Player of the Year' award after his first season with the club, he was rewarded with his first professional contract in October 1975.

Allinson played a crucial role in Colchester's promotion winning side of the 1976–77 season, netting the winning goal in the final game of the season against Bradford City that secured a promotion slot. A consistent performer with the U's, it was not until the 1981–82 season that Allinson began to be noticed by the wider football world. Colchester boasted a powerful strike force of Roy McDonough, Kevin Bremner, Tony Adcock and Allinson, who scored 43 league goals in just two seasons. Allinson was valued in the region of £100,000 to Colchester, but an administration error cost the club dearly when his future benefits and bonuses were erroneously entered as less than his previous contract, entitling the player to a free-transfer. Fulham were the club most likely to sign Allinson, before a late bid from Arsenal was placed, joining them in the summer of 1983.

Allinson's debut for Arsenal came in a shock League Cup defeat to Walsall on 29 November 1983, signalling the end of Terry Neill's tenure as manager of the club. He played 105 times in all competitions for Arsenal scoring 23 goals, and was influential during the League Cup semi-final game with local rivals Tottenham Hotspur on 4 March 1987, coming on as a substitute to score the goal to draw the sides level after 82 minutes, and then providing the assist for David Rocastle to score the winner. However, Allinson was left out of the squad for the final, in which Arsenal defeated Liverpool.

Having only made 14 appearances for Arsenal in the 1986–87 season, Allinson joined Second Division club Stoke City, but only made nine appearances for the team before signing for Luton Town for a £10,000 fee in October 1987. He scored three goals in 32 league games for Luton, before rejoining Colchester United in December 1988 on a free transfer. He had helped Luton to the FA Cup semi-final and the Full Members Cup final in 1988 prior to his Colchester return.

Allinson was tasked with having to help save Colchester from relegation from the Football League to the Conference by caretaker manager Steve Foley, and under new manager Jock Wallace, United clawed their way back up from the bottom of the league table, with Allinson scoring seven crucial goals to stave off the threat of relegation in the 1988–89 season. However, the club's form failed to improve, and he was released just before Christmas 1989, when he joined Baldock Town as player-manager.

== Managerial career ==
Following his retirement from playing, Allinson became player-manager at Baldock Town from 1989 to 1992 before spending six years managing Stotfold. He later managed Barton Rovers on two occasions, Harlow Town, Boreham Wood, Stotfold on a further two occasions, and back to Boreham Wood.

In 1994, he managed Corby Town F.C. whose chairman at the time was Steve Evans. Upon taking on the Chairmanship of the Northamptonshire club, Evans dismissed the managerial duo of Bryn Gunn and Gerry McElhinney in favour of Allinson but he resigned just a day after his appointment when he tendered his resignation after returning home from his first training session where he was introduced to the players. Allinson later commented of the episode: "I hadn't met Steve Evans before and didn't know why he had approached me. But after thinking about it I doubted if we would be able to work together."

Allinson took Boreham Wood to promotion in the Isthmian League Premier Division via the play-offs in the 2009–10 season, defeating Kingstonian 2–0 in the final.

During a game against Havant & Waterlooville in January 2011, the ball was put out of play so a Havant player could receive treatment, and upon passing the ball back to the Havant keeper, Boreham Wood player Mario Noto overhit his pass back to the goalkeeper and the ball hit the back of the net. Allinson signalled to his players to allow Havant to score a goal unchallenged. For this gesture, Allinson was hailed for his sportsmanship by Havant manager Shaun Gale.

Allison left Boreham Wood in October 2015 due to other work commitments. However, he confirmed that he would not retire from football. On 12 February 2016 Allinson took over managerial duties at St Albans City FC.

Allinson left St Albans City FC by mutual consent in September 2022. Allinson continued in his non-football role as commercial manager before leaving this in November.

Later in November 2022, Ian Allinson would join the club Hendon F.C in the capacity of general manager. As of the 7th of November 2024, he continues to manage Hendon.

== Personal life ==
Alongside his managerial duties, Allinson has worked in sales, and during Boreham Wood's FA Trophy run in 2006, he was working as a marketing representative for the competition's sponsors, Carlsberg. Allinson was acting as the club's director of football at the time.

In February 2019, Allinson was inducted into the Colchester United Hall of Fame.

His son Lee is also a football coach, and the two worked together at Hemel Hempstead Town.

== Career statistics ==
Appearances and goals by club, season and competition
Club	Season	League			FA Cup		League Cup		Other (Note: Includes Football League Group Cup, Football League Trophy, Full Members Cup)		Total	
Club	Season	Division	Apps	Goals	Apps	Goals	Apps	Goals	Apps	Goals	Apps	Goals
Colchester United	1974–75	Third Division	1	0	0	0	0	0	0	0	1	0
Colchester United	1975–76	Third Division	5	0	0	0	0	0	0	0	5	0
Colchester United	1976–77	Fourth Division	39	7	2	0	2	0	0	0	43	7
Colchester United	1977–78	Third Division	45	6	4	0	5	1	0	0	54	7
Colchester United	1978–79	Third Division	46	5	7	0	2	0	0	0	55	5
Colchester United	1979–80	Third Division	38	2	4	1	4	1	0	0	46	4
Colchester United	1980–81	Third Division	46	6	4	1	2	0	0	0	52	7
Colchester United	1981–82	Fourth Division	42	21	5	3	5	2	0	0	52	26
Colchester United	1982–83	Fourth Division	46	22	1	0	4	2	3	2	54	26
Colchester United	Total		308	69	27	5	24	6	3	2	362	82
Arsenal	1983–84	First Division	9	0	0	0	1	0	0	0	10	0
Arsenal	1984–85	First Division	27	10	2	0	1	1	0	0	30	11
Arsenal	1985–86	First Division	33	6	5	3	5	1	0	0	43	10
Arsenal	1986–87	First Division	14	0	2	1	5	1	0	0	21	2
Arsenal	Total		83	16	9	4	12	3	0	0	104	23
Stoke City	1987–88	Second Division	9	0	0	0	1	0	0	0	10	0
Luton Town	1987–88	First Division	27	3	5	1	0	0	4	0	36	4
Luton Town	1988–89	First Division	5	0	0	0	1	0	0	0	6	0
Luton Town	Total		32	3	5	1	1	0	4	0	42	4
Colchester United	1988–89	Fourth Division	25	7	3	1	0	0	3	1	31	9
Colchester United	1989–90	Fourth Division	13	3	0	0	2	0	0	0	15	3
Colchester United	Total		38	10	3	1	2	0	3	1	46	12
Career total			470	98	44	11	40	9	10	3	564	121

== Honours ==
=== As a player ===
Luton Town

- Full Members' Cup runner-up: 1987–88

Individual

- Colchester United Young Player of the Year: 1974–75

=== As manager ===
Boreham Wood

- Isthmian League play-offs: 2010
- Conference South play-offs: 2015
