= Stewart Bright =

English footballer

Personal information
- Full name: Stewart Linden Bright
- Date of birth: 13 October 1957 (age 69)
- Place of birth: Colchester, England
- Height: 5 ft 8 in (1.73 m)
- Position: Defender

Youth career
- Colchester United

Senior career*
Years	Team	Apps	(Gls)
1975–1976	Colchester United	25	(0)
- Chelmsford City
Total		25	(0)
- * Club domestic league appearances and goals

Stewart Linden Bright (born 13 October 1957) is an English former footballer who played as a defender in the Football League for Colchester United.

== Career ==
Born in Colchester, Bright began his playing career with hometown club Colchester United. He made his debut on 8 November 1975 at the age of 18 in a 1–1 draw with Shrewsbury Town at Layer Road. He was a 10th-minute substitute for John Froggatt after he suffered ligament damage. Bright made 25 league appearances for Colchester with his final appearance coming in a 2–0 away defeat to Scunthorpe United prior to joining Chelmsford City.
