= Glenn Ellis =

English footballer

Personal information
- Full name: Glenn Douglas Ellis
- Date of birth: 31 October 1957 (age 68)
- Place of birth: Dagenham, England
- Position: Goalkeeper

Youth career
- Ipswich Town

Senior career*
Years	Team	Apps	(Gls)
1974–1977	Ipswich Town	0	(0)
1977	→ Colchester United (loan)	2	(0)
- Harlow Town
- Lowestoft Town
Total		2	(0)

International career
1973	England Schoolboys	7	(0)
- * Club domestic league appearances and goals

Glenn Douglas Ellis (born 31 October 1957) is an English former footballer who played as a goalkeeper in the Football League for Colchester United on loan from Ipswich Town.

== Career ==
Born in Dagenham, Ellis came through the youth ranks at Ipswich Town, making 11 appearances in the reserve team during the 1975–76 season. He joined Colchester United on loan during the 1976–77 season, making his Football League debut on 19 February 1977. He kept a clean-sheet in a 1–0 win over Watford. His final game came in the following match, a 2–1 away victory at Newport County on 22 February, totalling two appearances for the club. Ellis was released from Ipswich in 1977, later having spells at Harlow Town and Lowestoft Town.
