= Roy Clayton =

English footballer (born 1950)

Personal information
- Full name: Roy Charles Clayton
- Date of birth: 18 February 1950 (age 76)
- Place of birth: Dudley, England
- Position: Forward

Senior career*
Years	Team	Apps	(Gls)
1968–1969	Warley County Borough		
1969–1972	Oxford United	53	(8)
1972–1980	Kettering Town	309	(141)
1980–1981	Barnet (Note: Figures combine loan and permanent spell)	28	(4)
1981–1982	Nuneaton Borough	25	(8)
1982–1985	Corby Town		
1986	VS Rugby	3	(1)
- * Club domestic league appearances and goals

Roy Charles Clayton (born 18 February 1950) is an English former professional footballer who played as a forward. He began his career with Warley County Borough before making 53 appearances in the Football League for Oxford United. Moving back into non-league football, he spent eight years with Kettering Town, finishing as their all-time top scorer, and also played for Barnet, Nuneaton Borough, Corby Town and VS Rugby.

== Life and career ==
Roy Charles Clayton was born on 18 February 1950 in Dudley, Worcestershire. He played football for West Midlands (Regional) League club Warley County Borough before turning professional with Oxford United of the Football League Second Division in August 1969. He made his Football League debut on 20 December, in a 2–0 defeat away to Watford, and had a run of games in the side towards the end of the season during which he scored his first goal at Football League level, albeit in a 5–1 defeat, at home to Sheffield United. Clayton played about half of Oxford's matches over the next two seasons but scored little. His last goal, on 6 September 1972, gave Oxford a 2–1 lead against Manchester United in the League Cup second round, but Bobby Charlton equalised. Clayton was dropped from the team for the replay and promptly submitted a transfer request.

In November 1972, Oxford accepted an £8,000 offer from Kettering Town – a Southern League record fee paid – and Clayton moved into non-League football. On his second appearance, he opened the scoring in the FA Cup tie away to Football League club Walsall, and scored Kettering's third as they came back from 3–1 down to draw 3–3. He continued to play and to score freely for the next eight years, finishing his Kettering career as the club's all-time record goalscorer with 187 in all competitions, a record that still stands, as of 2022, and he remains in the top five of the all-time appearance charts. In 1979, he helped the team reach the FA Trophy final, in which Kettering lost to Stafford Rangers.

Clayton joined Alliance Premier League club Barnet on loan in August and signed a permanent contract in early October. The players helped raise the £4,000 fee. He stayed for one season, during which he scored four goals from 28 league appearances, and then joined Nuneaton Borough, newly relegated to the Southern League Midland Division. He contributed eight goals from 25 league matches as Nuneaton returned to the Alliance Premuer League at the end of the season, but his last game was in March 1982. With the club about to sign former Coventry City striker Don Nardiello, manager Graham Carr thought Clayton would play little, so he moved on to divisional rivals Corby Town. He finished off his career with a brief spell at VS Rugby of the Southern League Midland Division in 1986.

== Sources ==
- "Nuneaton Borough 1979–1991 – Part 1" (PDF). From Town to Town. Nuneaton Town Supporters' Co-operative. 2015.
- "Statistics Log 1889–2020" (PDF). From Town to Town. Nuneaton Town Supporters' Co-operative. 2020.
