= Russell Cotton =

English footballer (1960–2019)

Personal information
- Full name: Russell Andrew Cotton
- Date of birth: 4 April 1960
- Place of birth: Wellington, England
- Date of death: 20 October 2019 (aged 59)
- Position: Midfielder

Youth career
- Colchester United

Senior career*
Years	Team	Apps	(Gls)
1977–1982	Colchester United	37	(1)
- Chelmsford City
Total		37	(1)
- * Club domestic league appearances and goals

Russell Andrew Cotton (4 April 1960 - 20 October 2019) was an English footballer who played in the Football League as a midfielder for Colchester United.

== Career ==
Born in Wellington, Herefordshire, Cotton came through the youth ranks at Colchester United, making his Football League debut against Port Vale on 24 April 1978 in a 3–0 victory, coming on as a substitute for Mick Packer. He made 37 appearances for the U's between 1977 and 1982, scoring once, the only goal of the game in a victory against Hull City on 17 March 1981 at Boothferry Park. His final game for the club came just over one year after he scored that goal in a 1–1 home draw with Crewe Alexandra on 30 March 1982. He appeared for Chelmsford City after leaving Colchester. Currently living in New Zealand after playing for braintree town Essex and transferred to Christchurch United, South Island, New Zealand in 1985 Then transferred to Wellington City, North Island the following year

While in Wellington he played and coached for several local football clubs, including Waterside, Seatoun and Marist. With Marist AFC he later became their 1st team Men's coach.

In May 2019 the Wellington newspaper 'DomPost' ran an article in respect of his battle with cancer.

In November 2019, it was reported on the Marist AFC Facebook Public Group page that Russell had died from his cancer on 20 October 2019 at the age of 59 years.
