= John Emanuel =

Welsh footballer

Personal information
- Full name: John Emanuel
- Date of birth: 5 April 1948 (age 78)
- Place of birth: Treherbert, Wales
- Height: 5 ft 8 1/2 in (1.74 m)
- Position: Midfielder

Youth career
- Ferndale

Senior career*
Years	Team	Apps	(Gls)
1971–1976	Bristol City	128	(10)
1976	→ Swindon Town (loan)	6	(0)
1976	Gillingham	4	(0)
1976–1978	Newport County	79	(4)
- Barry Town
Total		217	(14)

International career
	Wales	2	(0)
- * Club domestic league appearances and goals

John Emanuel (born 5 April 1948), is a former Wales international footballer. A midfielder, he began his league career at Bristol City after being signed from Ferndale aged 23 years, he also spent time on loan at Swindon Town and Gillingham. He joined Newport County in 1976 and made 79 Football League appearances for Newport, scoring 4 goals. In 1978, he joined Barry Town.

Emanuel attained 2 caps for the Wales national football team.
