= Peter Abbott (footballer) =

English footballer

Personal information
- Full name: Peter Ashley Abbott
- Date of birth: 1 October 1953 (age 73)
- Place of birth: Rotherham, England
- Height: 6 ft 1 in (1.85 m)
- Position: Forward

Youth career
- 1970–1972: Manchester United

Senior career*
Years	Team	Apps	(Gls)
1972–1974	Manchester United	10	(7)
1974–1976	Swansea City	42	(3)
1976	Hartford Bicentennials	10	(1)
1976–1977	Crewe Alexandra	31	(8)
1977–1979	Southend United	27	(4)
- * Club domestic league appearances and goals

Peter Ashley Abbott (born 1 October 1953) is an English former professional footballer who played in the Football League, as a forward.
