= Garry Watson =

English footballer

Personal information
- Date of birth: 7 October 1955 (age 71)
- Place of birth: Bradford, England
- Position: Left back

Youth career
- 1970–1972: Bradford City

Senior career*
Years	Team	Apps	(Gls)
1972–1984	Bradford City	263	(28)
1982	→ Doncaster Rovers (loan)	13	(0)
1984–1985	Halifax Town	21	(0)
- Whitby Town
Total		297	(28)

Managerial career
- Guiseley
- * Club domestic league appearances and goals

Garry Watson (born 7 October 1955) is an English retired professional footballer who played as a left back.

== Career ==
Born in Bradford, Watson played for Bradford City, Doncaster Rovers, Halifax Town and Whitby Town.

He signed for Bradford City in November 1970 after playing local amateur football. He made a total of 293 appearances for the club, scoring 30 goals - 28 goals in 263 league appearances, no goals in 10 FA Cup appearances, and 2 goals in 20 League Cup appearances. He signed on loan for Doncaster Rovers in October 1982, and played for Halifax Town between July 1984 and May 1985.

After a spell managing non-league club Guiseley, in October 2013 he was running a carpet fitting business in Eccleshill, Bradford.

== Sources ==
- Frost, Terry (1988). Bradford City A Complete Record 1903-1988. Breedon Books Sport. ISBN 0-907969-38-0.
