= Steve Wright (footballer, born 1959) =

English footballer

Personal information
- Full name: Stephen Peter Wright
- Date of birth: 16 June 1959 (age 67)
- Place of birth: Clacton-on-Sea, England
- Height: 6 ft 0 in (1.83 m)
- Position: Central defender

Senior career*
| Years | Team | Apps | (Gls) |
| 1977–1982 | Colchester United | 117 | (3) |
| 1982 | HJK Helsinki | 9 | (1) |
| 1982–1983 | Braintree Town | ? | (?) |
| 1983 | Lappfjärds BK | ? | (2) |
| 1983–1985 | Wrexham | 76 | (0) |
| 1985–1986 | Torquay United | 33 | (0) |
| 1986–1988 | Crewe Alexandra | 72 | (3) |
| 1988–1989 | Rhyl | ? | (?) |
| 1989–1990 | Chelmsford City | 9 | (0) |
| 1990–1997 | Wivenhoe Town | 177 | (2) |
| 1997–1998 | Harwich & Parkeston | ? | (?) |
| Total | | 316 | (9) |
- * Club domestic league appearances and goals

Stephen Peter Wright (born 16 June 1959) is an English former professional footballer who played in the Football League as a defender.
