= Bobby Hodge =

English footballer

Personal information
- Full name: Robert William Hodge
- Date of birth: 30 April 1954 (age 72)
- Place of birth: Exeter, England
- Position: Winger

Youth career
- Exeter City

Senior career*
Years	Team	Apps	(Gls)
1974–1978	Exeter City	128	(18)
1978–1981	Colchester United	92	(14)
1981–1982	Torquay United	4	(1)
- Chelmsford City
- Fredrikstad FK
Total		224	(33)
- * Club domestic league appearances and goals

Robert William Hodge (born 30 April 1954) is an English former footballer who played in the Football League as a winger for Exeter City, Colchester United and Torquay United.

== Career ==
Born in Exeter, Hodge began his career with local team Exeter City. He made 128 league appearances for the club and scored 18 goals between 1974 and 1978, helping the club to promotion to the Third Division in the 1976–77 season by finishing in second position in the league table.

Colchester United signed Hodge in 1978 for a fee of £15,000 and made his debut for the club on 23 September 1978, a 2–2 draw with Walsall at Fellows Park. He scored his first goal in a 1–0 victory at Darlington in the third round of the FA Cup on 9 January 1979. He would go on to score 14 league goals in 92 appearances for the club between 1978 and 1981. He scored his last goal for the club in a 1–0 win over Newport County at Layer Road on 20 December 1980, and played his final U's game on 7 February 1981, a 3–1 away defeat to Millwall.

Following his Colchester United exit, Hodge joined south coast club Torquay United for a brief stint, appearing in four league games and scoring once. He would later represent Chelmsford City and Norwegian club Fredrikstad FK.

== Honours ==
Exeter City

- 1976–77 Football League Fourth Division runner-up (Level 4)

All honours referenced by:
