= Mick Packer =

English footballer

Personal information
- Full name: Michael David Packer
- Date of birth: 20 April 1950 (age 76)
- Place of birth: Willesden, London, England
- Position: Fullback

Senior career*
Years	Team	Apps	(Gls)
1968–1973	Watford	68	(2)
1971–1972	→ Crewe Alexandra (loan)	12	(0)
1973–1983	Colchester United	344	(20)
1983–?	Wivenhoe Town	134	(9)
- * Club domestic league appearances and goals

Michael David Packer (born 20 April 1950) is an English former professional footballer who played as a fullback.

== Career ==
In 1968 Packer was listed in the Watford match programme v Oldham as "Roy Packer" https://oldwatford.com/1968/12/14/14th-december-1968-division-three-watford-2-oldham-athletic-0/

Jim Smith signed Packer on a free transfer from Watford for Colchester in July 1973. At Watford, Packer had played in the 1970 FA Cup semi-final alongside future U's players John Williams, Mike Walker and Brian Owen but he was loaned to Crewe on deadline day 1972. Making 12 appearances at Gresty Road, Packer was released by the Hornets in the summer of 1973. Primarily a left back, he played at the heart of the defence and in midfield, had a no-nonsense attitude and a thunderous shot.

He played in United's big cup ties against Southampton, Derby, Leeds, Manchester United and Newcastle. He also won promotion to Division Three, twice, and played under Jim Smith, Bobby Roberts and Allan Hunter. His long service was rewarded with a testimonial against West Ham in May 1983. On being released from Layer Road, he joined Wivenhoe as player-manager. Later, whilst managing a local leisure centre, he assisted A.F.C. Sudbury and their reserve side. Leslie was inducted into the Colchester United Hall of Fame in 2010 just days before his 60th birthday.
