= Pat Lally (footballer) =

English footballer

Personal information
- Full name: Patrick Anthony Lally
- Date of birth: 11 January 1952 (age 74)
- Place of birth: Paddington, England
- Height: 5 ft 10 in (1.78 m)
- Position: Midfielder

Youth career
- –1970: Millwall

Senior career*
Years	Team	Apps	(Gls)
1970–1971	Millwall	1	(0)
1971–1973	York City	71	(5)
1973–1978	Swansea City	161	(10)
1975	→ Aldershot (loan)	3	(0)
1978–1982	Doncaster Rovers	122	(0)
1982–1983	Burton Albion	51	(5)
Total		409	(20)
- * Club domestic league appearances and goals

Patrick Anthony Lally (born 11 January 1952) is an English former footballer who played as a midfielder.

== Career ==
Born in Paddington, London, Lally started his career with Millwall after signing as a professional in January 1970 and made one appearance in the Football League before signing for York City on a two-month trial in July 1971. He made his debut in a 1–0 defeat to Oldham Athletic on 31 August 1971 and he finished the 1971–72 season with 43 appearances and two goals. He made 38 appearances and scored three goals during the 1972–73 season, and he became known for "driving runs from midfield" during his time at York. He was signed by Swansea City for a fee of £7,000 in August 1973 and he made 161 league appearances and scored 10 goals for the club. While at Swansea, he had a loan with Aldershot, who he joined in October 1975, and made three league appearances. He left Swansea in September 1978 when he joined Doncaster Rovers, where he made 122 league appearances, before leaving at the end of the 1981–82 season. In 1982 he went on to have a spell with non-League side Burton Albion playing 51 games and scoring 5 goals, before his playing career was cruelly ended with a broken leg during a match in November 1983. Later he became an education officer for the Professional Footballers' Association, and he now works as the regional League Football education officer for the North.
