= John Homewood =

English football referee

Bartley John Homewood
- Full name: Bartley John Homewood
- Born: 1932
- Died: June 1991 (aged 58–59)

Domestic
Years	League	Role
1966–1979	Football League	Referee

International
Years	League	Role
1972–1979	FIFA	Referee / Linesman

Bartley John Homewood (1932 – June 1991) was an English former football referee in the Football League and for FIFA. During his time on the List he was based in Sunbury-on-Thames, Surrey.

== Career ==
Homewood reached the Football League referees List in 1966. Just two years later he was senior linesman to Leo Callaghan in the FA Cup Final between West Bromwich Albion and Everton at Wembley. Four years after that he was appointed a FIFA referee.^{†}

He remained an international referee for the last seven years of his career. He took charge regularly of top division games but was never appointed to either of the two major Finals. He did referee at Wembley though for the 1976 Charity Shield match between Liverpool and Southampton. He took charge of a number of European club ties, the most significant being a UEFA Cup third round match between Stuttgart and Dukla Prague in November 1978. Six months later one of his final matches was a European Championships qualifying match between Hungary and Greece, to reach the final stages of the 1980 tournament. He retired at the end of that season (1978–79).
