= Striking partnership =

Striking-partnership is a term used in European football (soccer) referring to a partnership between the strikers of a football team. In modern football there are usually two strikers on each team, either playing alongside each other as out-and-out strikers or with one of them tucked in just behind the other, in the so-called "hole" (between the opponents defence line and midfield).

Striking-partnerships' success is often measured in goals. Often the number of goals they score in between the two of them during one season. They can also be evaluated applying other measures, i.e. their interaction on the pitch.
