= Ray Bunkell =

English footballer

Personal information
- Full name: Raymond Keith Bunkell
- Date of birth: 18 September 1949
- Place of birth: Edmonton, London, England
- Date of death: March 2000 (age 50)
- Place of death: Wrexham, Wales
- Height: 5 ft 9 in (1.75 m)
- Position: Midfielder

Senior career*
| Years | Team | Apps | (Gls) |
| 1967–1971 | Tottenham Hotspur | 0 | (0) |
| 1971–1974 | Swindon Town | 56 | (3) |
| 1974–1980 | Colchester United | 129 | (9) |
| Total | | 185 | (12) |
- * Club domestic league appearances and goals

Raymond Keith Bunkell (18 September 1949 – March 2000) was an English footballer who played as a midfielder in the Football League. He played with Tottenham Hotspur, Swindon Town and Colchester United.
