= Eddie Rowles =

English footballer

Personal information
- Full name: Albert Edward James Rowles
- Date of birth: 10 March 1951 (age 75)
- Place of birth: Gosport, England
- Height: 5 ft 9 in (1.75 m)
- Position: Midfielder

Senior career*
Years	Team	Apps	(Gls)
1968–1971	Bournemouth & Boscombe Athletic	66	(12)
1971–1973	York City	67	(14)
1973–1975	Torquay United	59	(13)
1975–1977	Darlington	103	(21)
1977–1982	Colchester United	91	(17)
Total		386	(77)
- * Club domestic league appearances and goals

Albert Edward James Rowles (born 10 March 1951) is an English former footballer.

== Career ==
Rowles started his career with Bournemouth & Boscombe Athletic in March 1968. He joined York City in July 1971. He was York's top scorer for the 1972–73 season, with a total of 9 goals. He joined Torquay United in June 1973 and was top scorer in his first season. He then moved to Darlington in August 1975 and was top scorer in the 1976–1977 season. He left to join Colchester United in December 1977.
