= Steve Dowman =

English footballer

Personal information
- Date of birth: 15 April 1958 (age 68)
- Place of birth: Ilford, England
- Height: 5 ft 11 in (1.80 m)
- Position: Central defender

Youth career
- Colchester United

Senior career*
Years	Team	Apps	(Gls)
1976–1980	Colchester United	154	(21)
1980–1983	Wrexham	87	(2)
1983–1985	Charlton Athletic	61	(5)
1985–1986	Newport County	9	(1)
1986–1987	Cambridge United	45	(3)
- Brightlingsea United
1991-1993	Wivenhoe Town	64	(5)
1994-1997	Wivenhoe Town	66	(6)

Managerial career
- Brightlingsea United (player-manager)
- 1994–1998: Wivenhoe Town (player-manager, manager)
- * Club domestic league appearances and goals

Steve Dowman (born 15 April 1958) is an English former professional footballer who played in the Football League as a central defender.

== Career ==
Born in Manor Park, Dowman began his career at Colchester United, making 154 league appearances and scoring 21 goals. He then moved on to play for Wrexham, Charlton Athletic, Newport County and Cambridge United, before dropping into non-league football.

As a teenager, Dowman was considered an outstanding prospect and picked (along with his partner in central defense, Lindsay Smith) as part of the PFA 4th division team of the year. Particularly strong in the air, he scored so many goals moving forward for free kicks and corners that Colchester tried him as a centre forward before letting him to revert to his natural position.

== Honours ==
Individual

- PFA Team of the Year: 1976–77
- Colchester United Player of the Year: 1977
