= Ron Challis =

English football referee

- Full name: Ronald Challis
- Born: 1932; Bracknell, England
- Died: January 2001 (aged 68–69)

Domestic
Years	League	Role
1968–1981	Football League	Referee

Ronald Challis (1932 – January 2001) was an English football referee in the Football League. During his time on the National List he was based in Tonbridge, Kent.

== Career ==
Ron Challis became a Football League Referee in 1968 at age 35. In 1975, he was senior linesman to Pat Partridge for the FA Cup Final.^{‡} He took charge of the Final itself in 1979. This match between Arsenal and Manchester United is remembered for three goals being scored in the last four minutes: Arsenal had appeared to be easing to a 2–0 win before United scored twice to level the score; however Arsenal then scored a third through Alan Sunderland to win 3–2.

He had two more years as a Football League Referee before retiring at the end of the 1980/81 season.

Preceded by Derek Nippard	FA Cup Final Referee; 1979	Succeeded by George Courtney
