= Paul Dyer (footballer) =

English footballer

Personal information
- Full name: Paul David Dyer
- Date of birth: 24 January 1953 (age 73)
- Place of birth: Leicester, England
- Position: Midfielder

Youth career
- Notts County

Senior career*
Years	Team	Apps	(Gls)
1972–1975	Notts County	7	(0)
1975–1980	Colchester United	144	(4)
1980–????	Gravesend & Northfleet		
- Chelmsford City
- * Club domestic league appearances and goals

Paul David Dyer (born 24 January 1953) is an English former professional footballer who played as a midfielder for football league clubs Notts County and Colchester United, where he made over 100 appearances. He describes himself as a "bite and scratch midfield player". Dyer also played non-league football for Gravesend & Northfleet and Chelmsford City. Dyer is currently working as a taxi driver in Colchester, having previously worked as a volunteer at Colchester United, painting the roof, driving the minibus and sweeping the dressing rooms.
