= Micky Cook (footballer, born 1951) =

English footballer and manager

Personal information
- Full name: Michael Cook
- Date of birth: 9 April 1951 (age 75)
- Place of birth: Enfield, England
- Position: Right back

Youth career
- Leyton Orient

Senior career*
Years	Team	Apps	(Gls)
1969–1984	Colchester United	614	(21)

Managerial career
- 1999: Colchester United (Caretaker)
- * Club domestic league appearances and goals

Michael Cook (born 9 April 1951) is an English former professional footballer who played as a right back. Cook spent his entire career with Colchester United, making 614 appearances in the Football League and holds the all-time club record for appearances. During his career he was part of the side which won the Watney Cup and that beat Leeds United in the FA Cup. After retiring he became a youth coach at Colchester as well as having a brief spell as caretaker manager in 1999. His time at the club was ended in 2004 when he was made redundant by the club. During his time as a youth coach he helped talents such as Lomana Tresor Lua Lua to develop.
