= Mike Walker (Welsh footballer) =

Welsh footballer and manager (born 1945)

Personal information
- Full name: Michael Stewart Gordon Walker
- Date of birth: 28 November 1945 (age 80)
- Place of birth: Colwyn Bay, Wales
- Height: 6 ft 1 in (1.85 m)
- Position: Goalkeeper

Senior career*
Years	Team	Apps	(Gls)
1963–1964	Reading	0	(0)
1964–1966	Shrewsbury Town	7	(0)
1966–1968	York City	60	(0)
1968–1973	Watford	137	(0)
1973	→ Charlton Athletic (loan)	1	(0)
1973–1983	Colchester United	451	(0)
Total		656	(0)

International career
	Wales U23	4	(0)

Managerial career
- 1986–1987: Colchester United
- 1992–1994: Norwich City
- 1994: Everton
- 1996–1998: Norwich City
- 2000–2001: APOEL
- * Club domestic league appearances and goals

Michael Stewart Gordon Walker (born 28 November 1945) is a Welsh former footballer and manager. After starting his career at Reading, Walker played as a goalkeeper in the Football League for five clubs, most notably Watford and Colchester United. He later managed Colchester, Norwich City, Everton and APOEL. In 2010, he was inducted into the Colchester United Football Club Hall of Fame.

Walker represented Wales at under-23 level on four occasions. His son Ian, also a goalkeeper, later played for England's senior team.

== Playing career ==
Colwyn Bay-born Walker started his playing career as a goalkeeper with Reading in January 1963. He joined Shrewsbury Town in June 1964 and also played for York City, Watford, Charlton Athletic and most notably Colchester United, for whom he made 363 league appearances. Perhaps the most memorable moment in Walker's playing career came when lower division Watford knocked Bill Shankly's Liverpool out of the FA Cup in February 1970, in what was considered to be a major cup upset and a result, and which convinced Shankly of the need to dismantle his ageing side and begin building a new team.

Walker was inducted into the Colchester United Hall of Fame in the 2009–10 season, in recognition for his service to the club as a player and manager. Also inducted that season was Walker's former Watford and Colchester teammate Mick Packer.

== Managerial career ==
Walker had a brief spell in charge of Colchester United in 1986 but was sacked in 1987 whilst top of the league. He then took charge of the Norwich City reserve team in 1987. On 1 June 1992, he was promoted to the position of manager at Carrow Road and gave Norwich their highest-ever league finish in the new FA Premier League where they finished third and qualified for the 1993/94 UEFA Cup — the first time they had qualified for European competition - having missed out three times between 1985 and 1989 due to the ban on English clubs arising from the Heysel disaster. Norwich had led the league by eight points at one stage during the first half of the season, with impressive victories including a 4-2 away win over Arsenal on the opening day.

Norwich achieved a famous victory over FC Bayern Munich in the UEFA Cup second round before being knocked out by the eventual winners, Internazionale. Due to his achievements at Norwich, Walker was felt by many commentators at this time to be one of the most promising new managers in English football, and he was praised for the positive, attack-minded passing game played by his Norwich side, who began the 1993-94 season well, comfortably in the top half of a league table in which Manchester United were runaway leaders on their way to a second successive title.

Walker quit Norwich in January 1994, following a long running feud with Chairman Robert Chase (mainly centring on Chase's habit of selling off the club's key players without consulting his manager first - for example Robert Fleck to Chelsea just after Walker's appointment), to become manager of Everton, with Everton having to pay substantial compensation to Norwich to secure his services. Walker failed, however, to meet the high expectations of his new club. Although Walker oversaw an extraordinary last day escape from relegation with Everton securing a 3–2 home victory over Wimbledon (Everton had been 2-0 down early on in the game), Everton made a disastrous start to the 1994/95 season, failing to win a single league game until November. With Everton bottom of the table and having made their worst start to a league season, Walker was sacked having spent just ten months in charge and recording only six league wins, leaving him with the worst record of any post-war Everton manager. Walker was nicknamed the 'Silver Fox' during his time at Goodison. However, there were a few positive aspects of his reign at the club. They included the signing of Anders Limpar in March 1994, the gamble on Daniel Amokachi and the decision to bring the controversial Rangers striker Duncan Ferguson to Everton on loan, a gamble which ultimately paid off after Walker's departure with Joe Royle signing the Scot on a permanent basis. These players all played a key role in success for Everton after Walker had gone.

After Walker's dismissal, Everton went on that season not only to avoid relegation, but also to win the FA Cup under Royle.

Walker did not return to football until taking over again at Norwich on 21 June 1996, by which time the Canaries had been relegated to Division One. He remained in charge for two seasons but was sacked as manager after they failed to return to the Premiership. After leaving Norwich, Walker had a spell managing APOEL in Cyprus, where he resides to this day.

Norwich have yet to enjoy the level of success that they reached in 18 months under Walker, having spent most of their seasons since the mid 1990s outside the Premier League.

=== Managerial statistics ===
As of 27 March 2012.

Team	Nat	From	To	Record				
Team	Nat	From	To	P	W	D	L	Win %
Colchester United	(England)	10 April 1986	1 November 1987	79	35	16	28	44.30
Norwich City	(England)	1 June 1992	6 January 1994	80	36	20	24	45.00
Everton	(England)	7 January 1994	8 November 1994	35	6	11	18	17.14
Norwich City	(England)	21 June 1996	30 April 1998	98	32	26	40	32.65
Total				292	109	73	110	37.33

== Personal life ==
Walker is the father of Ian Walker, former England goalkeeper. He also has a son and a daughter. His wife and the mother of his children, Jacqueline "Jackie" Walker, died on 3 November 1997 after a long battle against cancer.

== Honours ==
=== Player ===
Watford

- Football League Third Division: 1968–69

Individual

- Colchester United Player of the Year: 1979–80, 1980–81, 1982–83

=== Manager ===
Individual

- Premier League Manager of the Month: October 1993
