= Johnny Williams (footballer, born 1947) =

English footballer (1947–2021)

Personal information
- Full name: John Robert Williams
- Date of birth: 26 March 1947
- Place of birth: Tottenham, London, England
- Date of death: 22 January 2021 (aged 73)
- Position: Left back

Youth career
- Bennetts End Youth Club
- 1962–1964: Watford

Senior career*
Years	Team	Apps	(Gls)
1964–1975	Watford	374	(2)
1975–1978	Colchester United	108	(1)
1978–1979	Margate	65	(2)
1979–1981	Gravesend & Northfleet	36	(0)
- * Club domestic league appearances and goals

John Robert Williams (26 March 1947 – 22 January 2021) was an English footballer who played as a left-back. He died in January 2021, aged 73.

== Career ==
After playing for Bennetts End Youth Club, Williams joined Watford as an apprentice in 1962, aged 15. He turned professional in September 1964, and went on to make 419 competitive appearances for Watford in the Football League, FA Cup and Football League Cup. He was part of the side that achieved promotion to the Second Division in 1968–69, and in 1970 played in Watford's first ever FA Cup semi final, against Chelsea. Williams scored two goals for Watford. Both came in 1971–72, a season in which Watford scored fewer goals than any other in their history.

Williams left Watford on a free transfer in 1975. He joined Colchester United, where he made 108 Football League appearances, scoring once, before joining non-league side Margate. He signed for Gravesend & Northfleet in December 1979 and played for two seasons before joining Chelmsford City.

== Honours ==
=== Club ===
Watford

- Football League Third Division Winner (1): 1968–69
