= Steve Foley (footballer, born 1953) =

English footballer

Personal information
- Full name: Steven Paul Foley
- Date of birth: 21 June 1953 (age 73)
- Place of birth: Clacton-on-Sea, England
- Position: Midfielder

Team information
- Current team: FC Clacton (coach)

Youth career
- –1971: Colchester United

Senior career*
Years	Team	Apps	(Gls)
1971–1981	Colchester United	283	(54)
–	Braintree Town		

Managerial career
- 1988–1989: Colchester United (caretaker)
- 1989–1990: Colchester United (caretaker)
- * Club domestic league appearances and goals

Steven Paul Foley (born 21 June 1953 in Clacton-on-Sea, Essex) is an English former professional footballer who made nearly 300 appearances in the Football League playing as a midfielder for Colchester United. He spent ten years on the coaching staff of Norwich City before moving to rivals Ipswich Town.

Foley began his football career as a trainee with Colchester United. He played for Colchester for ten years, scoring 54 goals from 283 games in the Football League, and then played for Braintree Town. He joined the coaching staff at Colchester, working with the young players, and spent several spells as caretaker manager during the 1980s. He also spent time as a youth team coach at Watford.

He joined Norwich City in 1996, appointed by manager Mike Walker, who had worked with Foley at Colchester, and had spent ten years with the club in various roles when his coaching contract was terminated with immediate effect in May 2006. Chairman Roger Munby said that, although Foley's input had been "invaluable", it was time to "freshen up the coaching set-up", though the press suggested that Foley was being made the scapegoat for the team's poor performance during the 2005–06 season. Foley then joined the coaching staff at Norwich City's arch rivals Ipswich Town.

In February 2019, Foley was inducted into the Colchester United Hall of Fame.

== Managerial statistics ==
Team	Nat	From	To	Record				
Team	Nat	From	To	P	W	D	L	Win %
Colchester United (Caretaker)	(England)	1 November 1987	4 November 1987	1	1	0	0	100.0
Colchester United (Caretaker)	(England)	16 October 1988	8 January 1989	18	5	5	8	27.8
Colchester United (Caretaker)	(England)	20 December 1989	3 January 1990	3	2	0	1	66.7
Total				22	8	5	9	36.4
