= Colin Garwood =

English footballer

Personal information
- Full name: Colin Arthur Garwood
- Date of birth: 29 June 1949 (age 77)
- Place of birth: Heacham, England
- Height: 5 ft 9 in (1.75 m)
- Position: Striker

Senior career*
Years	Team	Apps	(Gls)
1967–1971	Peterborough United	66	(30)
1971–1974	Oldham Athletic	93	(35)
1974–1975	Huddersfield Town	28	(8)
1975–1978	Colchester United	87	(25)
1978–1980	Portsmouth	71	(34)
1980–1982	Aldershot	81	(25)
–	Boston United		
Total		426	(157)
- * Club domestic league appearances and goals

Colin Arthur Garwood (born 29 June 1949 in Heacham, Norfolk) is an English former professional footballer who scored 157 goals from 426 games in the Football League playing as a striker for Peterborough United, Oldham Athletic, Huddersfield Town, Colchester United, Portsmouth and Aldershot during the 1960s, 1970s and 1980s. The £54,000 Aldershot paid Portsmouth in February 1980 was a club record.
