= Bobby Roberts (footballer) =

Scottish footballer and manager

Personal information
- Full name: Robert Roberts
- Date of birth: 2 September 1940 (age 86)
- Place of birth: Edinburgh, Scotland
- Height: 1.75 m (5 ft 9 in)
- Position: Midfielder

Senior career*
Years	Team	Apps	(Gls)
1959–1963	Motherwell	91	(26)
1963–1970	Leicester City	230	(25)
1970–1972	Mansfield Town	80	(4)
1972–1973	Coventry City	2	(0)
1983	Wrexham	0	(0)
Total		403	(55)

International career
1963	Scottish League XI	1	(0)

Managerial career
- 1972–1973: Coventry City (Player-Coach)
- 1975–1982: Colchester United
- 1982–1985: Wrexham
- 1987–1988: Grimsby Town
- * Club domestic league appearances and goals as of 11:17, 8 July 2009 (UTC)

Robert Roberts (born 2 September 1940) is a Scottish former football player and manager who played as a midfielder.

== Playing career ==
He joined Motherwell from the Edinburgh Norton junior club, and went on to make almost 100 league appearances for the Steelmen. He was made player of the year by the supporter's association for 1962.

Roberts moved to play in the Football League with Leicester City for the 1963–64 season. He went on to play 230 league matches for the club, and also appeared in the 1969 FA Cup Final and the second leg of the 1965 Football League Cup final. On one occasion, he played as a goalkeeper at Old Trafford for 10 or 15 minutes when Peter Shilton was injured. He subsequently transferred to Mansfield Town.

== Managerial career ==
Roberts moved into coaching with a brief stint as player-coach with Coventry City, and then in June 1975 he was appointed as manager of Colchester United. He remained at the club for seven years, and led them to promotion to the Football League Third Division in the 1976–77 season.

Roberts also managed Wrexham from 1982 to 1985 and Grimsby Town from 1987 to 1988, relinquishing the role to Alan Buckley. Whilst managing Wrexham, his starting goalkeeper was injured for a 1983–84 Welsh Cup 3rd round tie against Worcester City on 29 November 1983, so he had to decide whether to play his reserve goalkeeper, who was a 16-year-old, or to put his own boots at the age of 43, and after choosing the latter, he helped his side to a 1–1 draw. In doing so at the age of 43 years and 88 days, Roberts became the oldest player in Wrexham's history, breaking a 61-year-old record from 1922 set by Lot Jones at 39. He still holds this record by a large margin, since the next closest is Ben Foster, aged 40.

To qualify for that tournament and then to play against two of the top teams at that time was probably the highlight of my managerial career.

— Bobby Roberts

With their starting goalkeeper fit again, Wrexham won the replay and went on to reach the Welsh Cup final, which they lost to Shrewsbury Town, but since they were an English club, Wrexham qualified for the 1984–85 European Cup Winners' Cup, and in doing so, Roberts became only the third coach in the club's history to lead Wrexham to a European competition, after John Neal and Arfon Griffiths. In the first round, Roberts guided his side to a famous victory over Paulo Futre's FC Porto, who had been the finalists of the previous season. They were then knocked-out in the second round by Sven-Göran Eriksson's Roma, the then runner-ups of the European Cup.

Since then, Roberts has moved into scouting, working for Derby County, Tottenham Hotspur, Newcastle United and Oxford City.

== Managerial statistics ==
Team	Nat	From	To	Record				
Team	Nat	From	To	P	W	D	L	Win %
Colchester United	(England)	20 June 1975	3 May 1982	375	143	108	124	38.1
Wrexham	(Wales)	9 June 1982	31 March 1985	124	30	36	58	24.2
Grimsby Town	(England)	1 July 1987	9 June 1988	54	14	13	27	25.9

== Honours ==
Leicester City

- FA Cup runner-up: 1968–69
- Football League Cup runner-up: 1964–65
