= John Walsh =

John Walsh may refer to the following people:

== Politicians ==
- Sir John Walsh, 1st Baronet (1759–1825), English landowner and MP
- John Walsh, 1st Baron Ormathwaite (1798–1881), British politician
- John Walsh (Australian politician) (1842–1893), Member of the Queensland Legislative Assembly
- John Walsh (Canadian politician), president of the Conservative Party of Canada
- John Walsh (Dakota politician), member of the Legislature of Dakota Territory
- John Walsh (Montana politician) (born 1960), U.S. Senator from Montana
- John Carroll Walsh (1816–1894), American politician from Maryland
- John E. Walsh (1958–2023), former Chairman of the Massachusetts Democratic Party
- John Edward Walsh (1816–1869), Irish lawyer and Conservative politician
- John J. Walsh (born 1962), member of the Michigan House of Representatives
- John Jackson Walsh (1871–1949), American politician from Massachusetts
- John M. Walsh (born 1940), American politician from Iowa
- John Walsh (Irish politician) (1856–1925), Irish businessman and nationalist politician
- John R. Walsh (1913–1975), U.S. Representative from Indiana
- John T. Walsh (politician) (1898–1977), American politician from Pennsylvania
- Jack Walsh (politician), American politician from Delaware

== Sportsmen ==
- John Walsh (American football) (born 1972), Brigham Young University starting quarterback
- John Walsh (baseball) (1879–1947), Major League player
- John Walsh (rugby league) (born 1946), rugby league footballer of the 1970s for Great Britain, England, and St Helens RLFC
- Johnny Walsh (footballer, born 1957), Irish former soccer player
- Johnny Walsh (Gaelic footballer) (1909–1998), Irish Gaelic footballer
- Johnny Walsh (hurler) (1874–1957), Irish athlete aka Seán Breathnach
- Jack Walsh (Australian footballer) (1892–1915), Australian rules footballer for South Melbourne
- Jack Walsh (cricketer) (1912–1980), Australian cricketer
- Jack Walsh (English footballer) (1901–1965), English footballer
- Jack Walsh (Gaelic footballer) (1903–?), Gaelic footballer for Kerry
- Jack Walsh (rugby league), Australian rugby league player
- Jack Walsh (rugby union) (born 2000), Australian rugby union player

== Religion ==
- John Walsh (bishop) (1830–1898), Roman Catholic Archbishop of Toronto
- John Baptist Walsh (c. 1750–1825), Irish cleric and administrator
- John T. Walsh (Adventist) (1816–1886), co-founder of a group which merged into the Advent Christian Church
- John Walsh (priest) (1691–1753), Irish Anglican priest

== Other people ==
- John Walsh (American scientist), associate professor of physiology
- John Walsh (art historian) (born 1937), Director of the J. Paul Getty Museum, 1983–2000
- John Walsh (artist) (born 1954), New Zealand painter
- John Walsh (dentist) (1911–2003), New Zealand dentist and academic
- John Walsh (filmmaker), British director
- John Walsh (Medal of Honor) (1841–1924), Irish-born Union Army soldier during the American Civil War
- John Walsh (printer) (1665/66–1736), and his son John Walsh (1709–1766), music publishers
- John Walsh (British scientist) (1726–1795), British scientist and Secretary to the Governor of Bengal
- John Walsh (television host) (born 1945), host of America's Most Wanted
- Johnny Walsh (gang member) (1852–1883), New York City gangster
- John A. Walsh, American sports journalist, executive editor of ESPN
- John C. Walsh, American writer and director
- John Evangelist Walsh (1927–2015), American writer and historian
- John F. Walsh (born 1961), United States Attorney for the District of Colorado, 2010–2016
- John G. Walsh (born 1950), American economist and acting Comptroller of the Currency
- John Henry Walsh (1810–1888), English writer on sport under the pseudonym of "Stonehenge"
- John P. Walsh (sociologist), professor of public policy at Georgia Institute of Technology
- John Prendergast Walsh (1798–1867), Irish-born soldier who served in the Battle of Waterloo
- John W. Walsh (1949–2017), American non-profit leader and patient advocate
- John Christopher Walsh, appellant in the Christy Walsh case in Northern Ireland

== See also ==
- Jonathan Walsh (born 1989), Swedish former professional StarCraft 2 player
- John Walshe (disambiguation)
- John Welsh (disambiguation)
