= Jack Welsh =

Jack Welsh may refer to:

- Jack Welsh (footballer, born 1924) (1924–2012), Australian rules footballer who played with Footscray in the Victorian Football League (VFL)
- Jack Welsh (footballer, born 1906) (1906–1964), Australian rules footballer for North Melbourne

== See also ==
- John Welsh (disambiguation)
- Jonathan Welsh (disambiguation)
- Jack Welch (disambiguation)
