= John Welch =

John or Jack Welch may refer to:

- John Welch (colonial administrator), 18th-century British governor of Anguilla
- John Welch (politician) (1805–1891), U.S. representative from Ohio
- John Welch (architect) (fl. 1880s), Brooklyn-based church architect
- Jack Welch (illustrator) (1905–1985), American illustrator
- Johnny Welch (1906–1940), baseball player
- John J. Welch Jr. (1930–2010), U.S. Assistant Secretary of the Air Force (Acquisition) 1987–1992
- Sir John Reader Welch, 2nd Baronet (1933–2023), British solicitor and baronet
- Jack Welch (1935–2020), American business executive and former CEO of General Electric
- John W. Welch (born 1946), scholar and Brigham Young University professor
- John Welch (basketball) (born 1963), assistant coach for the Sacramento Kings
- Jack Welch (American football) (fl. 1980s–2010s), former head football coach Kansas Wesleyan University Coyotes
- Jack Welch (field hockey) (born 1997), Australian field hockey player
- Jack Welch (admiral) (1941–2014), Chief of Navy (New Zealand)

== See also ==
- Jonathon Welch (born 1958), Australian choral conductor
- Jack Welsh (disambiguation)
- John Welsh (disambiguation)
