= Golden Lane Estate =

1950s council housing complex in London

Coordinates: 51.5223°N 0.0956°W

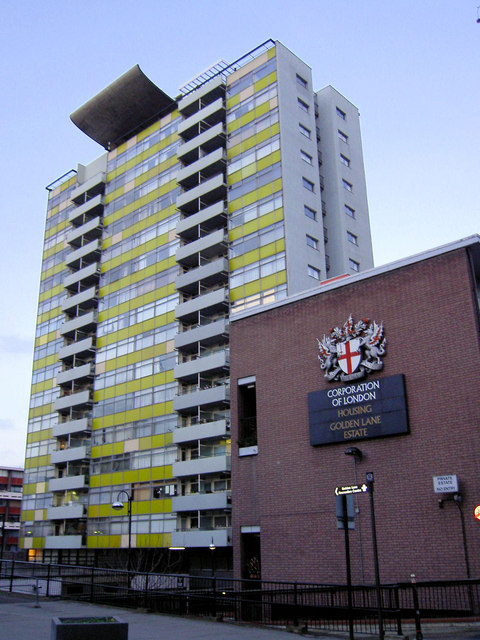
Great Arthur House, at the centre of the Golden Lane Estate, was the tallest residential building in Britain at the time of its construction.

The Golden Lane Estate is a 1950s council housing complex in the City of London. It was built on the northern edge of the City, on a site devastated by bombing during the Second World War. Since 1997, the estate has been protected by a grade II status, deemed a site of special architectural interest.

== Origins ==
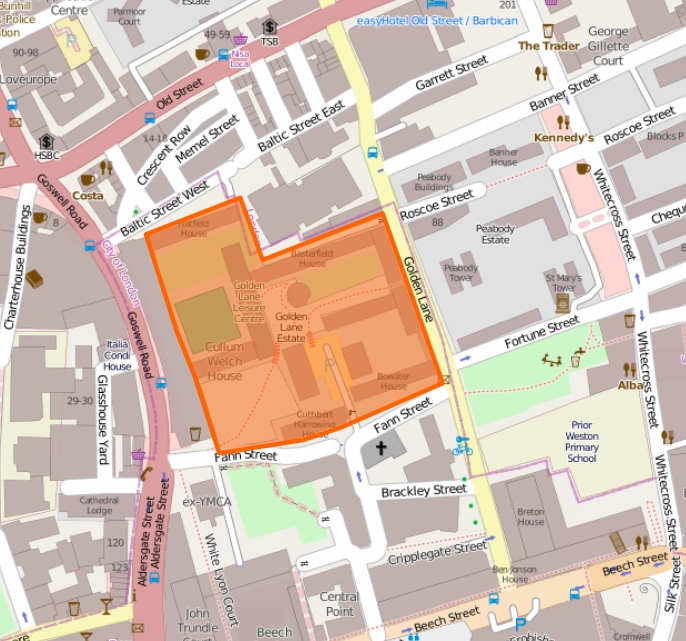
The location of the Golden Lane Estate

The estate provides residential accommodation to the north of Cripplegate, following destruction by Nazi bombing of much of the City of London during the Blitz of the Second World War. Only around 500 residents remained in the City in 1950, a mere 50 of whom lived in the Cripplegate area. The brief was to provide general-needs council housing for the people who serviced or worked in the City, as part of the comprehensive recovery and rebuilding strategy for the City of London.

At that time the Estate fell within the boundary of the Metropolitan Borough of Finsbury, and a proportionate number of tenancies were initially offered to those on the Finsbury waiting list. The Estate has been within the political boundary of the City of London since 1994, following boundary changes lobbied for by residents.

== Golden Lane architectural competition ==
The competition for designs was announced in 1951. At a time when post-Second World War recovery was still slow, this rare opportunity for architects in private practice to design such an estate attracted many entries. The competition was covered in the architectural and general press. The partnership of Chamberlin, Powell and Bon was formed when on 26 February 1952 Geoffry Powell was announced as competition winner. The three partners-to-be of Chamberlin, Powell and Bon were all lecturers in architecture at Kingston School of Art, and had entered into an agreement that if any of their separate entries won the competition, they would share the commission as a team. The competition was assessed by Donald McMorran, who also designed (in a traditional style) housing for the Corporation of London.

An entry from Alison and Peter Smithson was unsuccessful but received press coverage at the time, because their entry included an architectural visualisation of their 'street in the sky' proposal. This image was a photomontage of well-known figures who had been featured in a newspaper at the time, including Marilyn Monroe and her then partner Joe DiMaggio, French actor Gérard Philipe, and the first prime minister of Independent India, Jawaharlal Nehru. Their photograph was influential in its placement of a human figure within a visual representation of an unbuilt architecture. The Smithsons were members of the 'Independent Group' that also counted Eduardo Paolozzi and Nigel Henderson among its members.

== Development ==
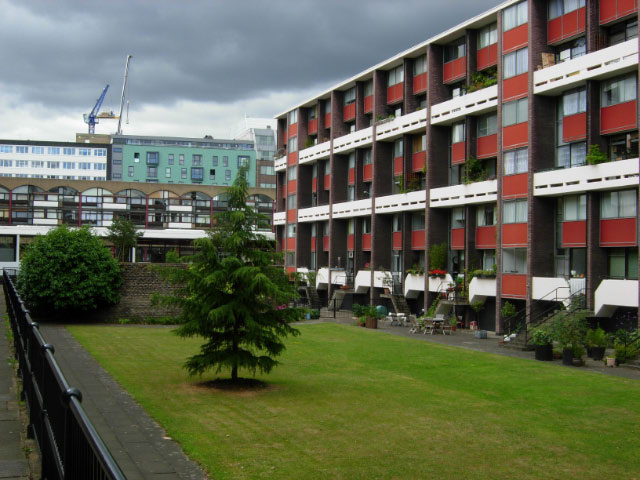
Basterfield House

Compared to other council housing of the era, there was a greater emphasis on the housing needs of single people and couples rather than families with children. Studios and one-bedroomed flats comprise the majority (359) of the 554 units. The population density, at 200 persons per acre, was high—but 60% of the site area is open space, a figure made possible by building taller structures than was common in 1951.

The site had been occupied since the mid-19th century by small Victorian industries and businesses, especially metal working. Some of the basements of the bombed buildings were retained as sunken areas of landscaping. It was designed by architects Chamberlin, Powell and Bon, who later designed the adjacent Barbican Estate. The Golden Lane Estate was commissioned and paid for by the City of London Corporation, which remains freeholder of the site and acts as its manager. However, it is distinguished from the bulk of the City of London, which is today the largely non-residential European financial services capital.

The first phase of the estate was officially opened in 1957, as stated on the commemorative stone on Bowater House. Before completion, the estate was enlarged to the west as more land was acquired, with three buildings added later: Cullum Welch House, Hatfield House and Crescent House. The increased site also permitted a recreation building, bowling green (now tennis courts) and other facilities to be added. The Estate was finally completed in 1962.

== Reception ==
A documentary, Top People, outlining the development of the area, was made by the Rank Organisation as one of its Look at Life documentaries.

When completed, the estate attracted even more publicity than the architectural competition, being viewed as a symbol of post-war recovery. It was widely photographed and written about, also featuring in various newsreel reports.

== Architecture ==
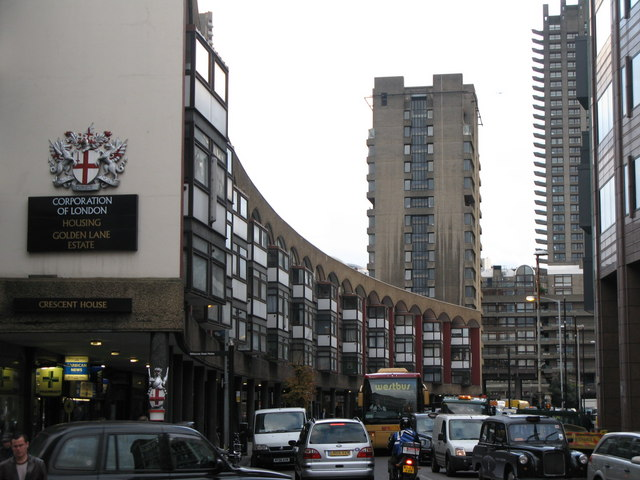
Crescent House, with the Barbican Estate in the background

The maisonette blocks are faced with panels in primary colours (red and blue on maisonette blocks and yellow on the tower block). Bush-hammered concrete occurs less than in the Barbican. However, some of the concrete surfaces which are today painted - for example on the narrow elevations of Great Arthur House - were originally unpainted but later coated when they suffered early on from staining and streaking from iron pyrites in the aggregate.

Inside, most maisonettes display open-tread cast terrazzo staircases projecting from the party walls as a cantilever. This, and the fact that the bedrooms are suspended, structurally speaking, without supports over the living rooms gives very compact planning with a surprisingly spacious feel to small flats, in spite of the fact that they were built under the severe Government building restrictions of the post-Second World War period. The engineer was Felix Samuely. Some maisonettes retain their hour-glass shaped hot-water radiators, visible in windows.

Crescent House, the last of the blocks to be completed in 1962 and the largest, runs along Goswell Road. Designed by the firm's assistant architect and draughtsman Michael Neylan, it shows a tougher aesthetic that the architects were developing at the adjacent Barbican scheme, the earliest phases of which were by then on site.

The architects kept to their brief of providing the high density within the 7 acres (2.8 ha) available. The visual anchor of the design is the tower block of one-bedroomed flats, Great Arthur House, which provides a vertical emphasis at the centre of the development and, at 16 storeys, was on its completion briefly the tallest residential building in Britain. It was the first residential tower block in London that was over 50 metres in height, and also the first building to breach the 100-feet height limit in the City of London.

== Naming ==
The names of structures on the Estate are a mixture of references to historic site features and individuals associated with the City of London.

- Hatfield House is named after Hatfield Street which ran off Goswell Road and was laid out at a date after Faithorne and Newcourt's map of London of 1658
- Great Arthur House takes its name from Great Arthur Street, which ran between Goswell Road (then Goswell Street) and Golden Lane, originally called Bridgwater Street and shown on Morgan's map of 1682
- Crescent House follows the historic building line of Goswell Road, creating a crescent. Architects Chamberlin Powell and Bon liked the evocation of an 18th- or 19th-century crescent, and their architecture can be seen as a modern interpretation of this.
- Cullum Welch House is named after Lt-Col.Sir George Cullum Welch, 1st Baronet, Lord Mayor when the estate was commissioned.
- Stanley Cohen was chairman of the City of London public health committee in 1954, when the estate building contract was let.
- Bowater House is named after Sir Noel Bowater Bt. the Lord Mayor of London who in 1954 laid the foundation stone of the estate at Bowater House, the first building to be completed, and on which his name is recorded.
- Cuthbert Harrowing was another chairman of the Public Health Committee of the City of London, who died shortly before the foundation stone was laid, but whose name is also recorded on the foundation stone.

== Roof garden ==
The roof garden at Great Arthur House offers clear views of St Paul's Cathedral and the adjacent Barbican Estate, as well as panoramic views across London. Rising three storeys, the structure incorporates the lift machinery and water tank housing into a modernist rooftop gazebo, making effective use of the tower block's limited roof space. The pergolas and integrated window-cleaning equipment are also designed to serve as sculptural features. An ornamental pool, crossed by stepping stones, extends towards the underside of the curved concrete canopy. The garden was originally accessible to all residents of the estate, but has been closed for more than a decade following two suicides.

== A model for social housing and urban living ==
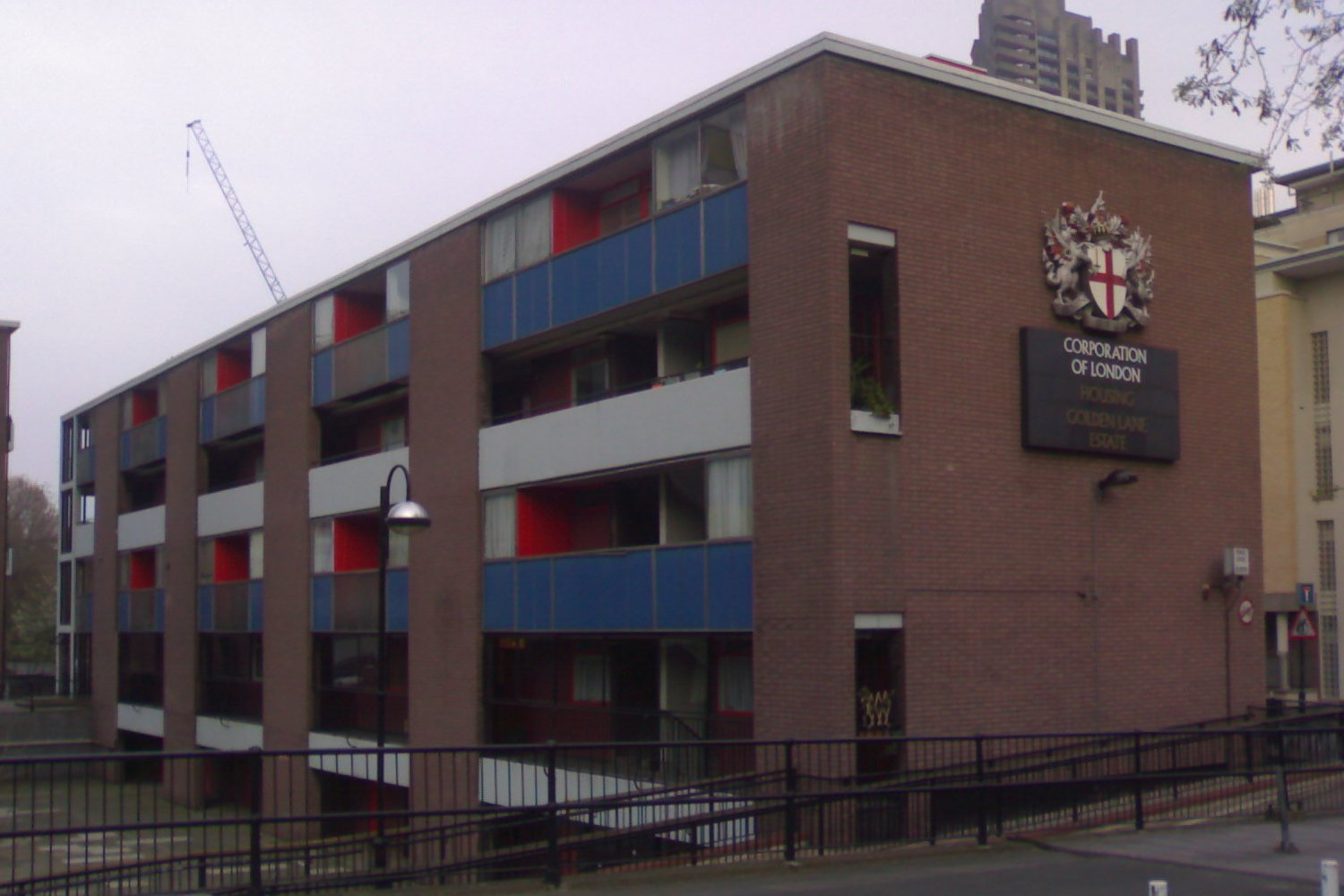
One of the maisonette blocks

From the outset, the estate was also regarded as a model of social integration with early tenants including caretakers, clergymen, clerks, doctors, office cleaners, police officers and secretaries.

Today the estate is home to approximately 1,500 people living in 559 studios and one-, two- or three-bedroom units. There are 385 flats and 174 maisonettes. On the western edge is a line of shops, and there were social facilities in order to create an urban microcosm. These included a public swimming pool, gym, guest flats for residents' visitors, estate office, pub and tennis courts (originally a bowling green), nursery and police office – the whole combining to make an urban microcosm. The nursery and police office have been closed but other facilities survive, preserving the values that lay behind the creation of the estate. Though once common in post-Second World War local authority planning and housing, this idealism, commitment to quality design and a holistic vision of urban living have in many cases been abandoned by municipalities.

The rental flats continue as council housing let at affordable rents. Applications for rented housing units can be made to the City of London for eligible applicants who live or work in the City of London. By 2016, 52% of the flats had been sold on long leases under the Right to Buy scheme provisions brought in by the Thatcher government; when subsequently sold, leases have proved attractive, and command prices in line with the surrounding area.

== Restoration ==
After two decades of abortive proposals to repair the two bespoke curtain walls of Great Arthur House, John Robertson Architects was finally selected by tender to replace them. Dating from 1959, the aluminium and glass system was leaking and not performing to modern thermal standards. The project included the wholesale replacement of the curtain wall system with a near facsimile giving higher thermal performance, and strengthening to the concrete frame to receive the heavier replacement walling. The cost to leaseholders is approximately £95,000 per flat.

This project is claimed to be the first of several to address the thermal efficiency of the estate and to address a substantial cumulative maintenance backlog by the freeholder, programmed to run from 2017 to 2027.

Restoration of the swimming pool and recreational facilities on the Estate was completed in 2015 by architects Cartwright Pickard. This saw the original design generally respected, but involved the conversion of residents' social facilities and a former police office into a commercially-run membership gym.

The former Community Hall and Social Club on the estate underwent conversion to a hall for hire. The architects were Studio Partington, and the work was completed in 2018. This involved wholesale reconfiguration of the internal layout and alterations to elevations, especially at roof level.

== Corbusian influences ==
Both the earlier work and that at Crescent House are clearly influenced by the work of Le Corbusier, an influence the architects were happy to acknowledge. Crescent House displays affinities with his Maisons Jaoul at Neuilly-sur-Seine, while the maisonettes (with their open-plan stairs and double-height stair spaces) are reminiscent of those at his Unité d'Habitation in Marseille, and also of his other work. The idea of an estate as urban microcosm is itself clearly traceable to the thinking of Le Corbusier, evidenced by the Unités and elsewhere. The detailing and finishes of the Golden Lane Estate do, however, differ substantially from those of Le Corbusier's work.

== Listed building status ==
Since 1997, the estate has been protected as a group of listed buildings of special architectural interest. The estate is listed at Grade II, except for Crescent House, which is listed at Grade II* in view of its importance as an example of post-war residential architecture. The common parts, landscapes and gardens of the estate were separately listed as a designed landscape at Grade II in 2020.

The estate has remained largely intact, despite undergoing a steady erosion of design detail. In 2006/2007, in part to address this erosion, Listed Building Management Guidelines were developed with Avanti Architects and a panel of residents and stakeholders to ensure the continued maintenance of the property. Though listing restricts owners' freedom to make modifications to their flats (under threat of criminal prosecution), values on the estate have followed others in the area in rising steadily since listing.

== Nearby rail & tube ==
- Liverpool Street station
- Barbican Underground station
- Moorgate station
- Farringdon station
- Old Street station
