= Peter Chamberlin =

English architect

Peter Hugh Girard Chamberlin CBE RA FRIBA (31 March 1919, London – 23 May 1978, Berkshire), most commonly known as Joe Chamberlin, was a post-War English architect most famous for his work on the Barbican Estate in London.

== Biography ==
Chamberlin was born on 31 March 1919. He attended Bedford School and Pembroke College, Oxford, where he read Politics, Philosophy and Economics. During the Second World War he was a conscientious objector. After the War, he attended Kingston School of Art's School of Architecture, qualifying as an architect in 1948.

He married Jean Bingham in 1940.

He became the dominant force in the architectural partnership of Chamberlin, Powell and Bon, responsible for designing the Barbican Estate in London.

In 1963, he was awarded the RIBA Distinction in Town Planning; in 1974, he was made a CBE. In 1975, he was elected an Associate of the Royal Academy, becoming a full RA in 1978, two weeks before his death.

Chamberlin died on 23 May 1978 before the Barbican Estate was completed.
