= John Welsh =

John Welsh may refer to:

- John Welsh of Ayr (1568–1622), religious leader
- John Welsh of Irongray, religious leader
- John Welsh (actor) (1904–1985), Irish actor
- John Welsh (Australian footballer) (born 1938), Australian rules football player for Essendon
- John Welsh (biologist) (1901–2002), American physiologist
- John Welsh (bishop) (1856–1916), Bishop of Trinidad and Tobago, 1904–1916
- John Welsh (diplomat) (1805–1886), American diplomat
- John Welsh (English footballer) (born 1984), English football player for Grimsby Town
- John Welsh (meteorologist) (1824–1859), FRS, Superintendent of Kew Observatory
- Jon Welsh (born 1986), Scottish rugby union player

== See also ==
- Jonathan Welsh (disambiguation)
- Jack Welsh (disambiguation)
- John Walsh (disambiguation)
- John Welch (disambiguation)
