= Dick Hughes (footballer) =

English footballer

Personal information
- Full name: Richard Gwynedd Hughes
- Date of birth: 2 August 1902
- Place of birth: Sunderland, England
- Date of death: April 1984 (aged 81)
- Place of death: Highbridge, Somerset, England
- Height: 5 ft 7 in (1.70 m)
- Position: Right back

Youth career
- –: Castletown

Senior career*
Years	Team	Apps	(Gls)
1919–1920	Sunderland	0	(0)
1920–1932	Bristol City	268	(0)
1932–1934	Exeter City	26	(0)

International career
19??	England Schoolboy capt		
- * Club domestic league appearances and goals

Richard Gwynedd Hughes (2 August 1902 – April 1984) was an English footballer. He made over 290 appearances in the Football League playing as a right back.

== Career ==
Hughes was the captain of the England Schoolboys team, then played locally for Castletown before signing as an amateur for Sunderland in July 1919. Joe Palmer signed Hughes in September 1920 for Bristol City. Hughes made his debut at right back replacing Lemmo Southway in a 2–0 win over Coventry City on 16 April 1921. Hughes made 4 appearances in season 1921–22 when Bristol City were relegated from the Second Division by a single point. The following season 1922–23 Hughes made 29 appearances as the "Robins" bounced back as Third Division South winners. Hughes shared the right back position with Ernie Glenn in the first season back in the Second Division making 15 appearances. He switched to left back playing alongside Glenn in 1924–25 making 34 appearances as Bristol City finished 3rd. The following season Hughes made 36 appearances as the right back with Glenn playing left back. Bristol City won promotion as Third Division South winners again in 1926–27 when Hughes made 26 appearances before being replaced at right back by Jock Walsh. Walsh and Glenn formed the regular full back partnership for the next four years as Bristol City struggled in the Second Division twice finishing 20th. Hughes made 3 appearances, 22 appearances, 18 appearances and 19 appearances deputising for the regular full back partners in these seasons. In his final season 1931–32 with Bristol City, Hughes made 25 appearances sharing the right back duties with Walsh as Jock Taylor moved from half back to become the regular left back.

Dick Hughes moved to Exeter City in August 1932 making 13 appearances in 1932–33 when Exeter City finished runners up in the Third Division South. Hughes made a further 13 appearances the following season but Charlie Miller, Exeter legendary left back with 274 league apps, recovered from a knee injury to resume duties as regular left back.

After retirement Hughes was landlord of the "Old Inn" at Hutton near Weston-super-Mare.

== Honours ==
with Bristol City

- Football League Third Division South winner: 1922–23, 1926–27
