= Chamberlin, Powell and Bon =

English modernist architectural firm

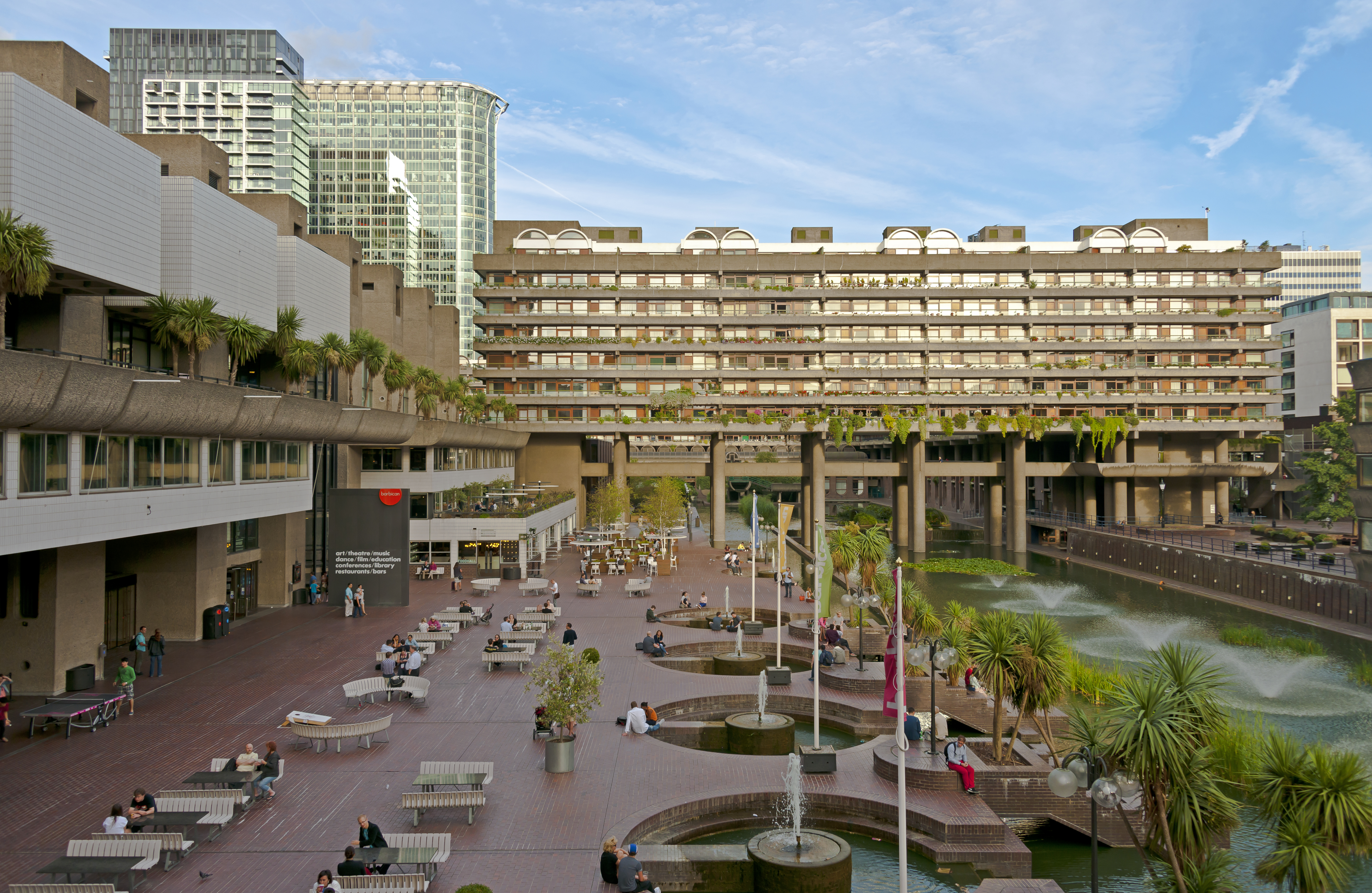
The Barbican Centre (pictured in 2014), which was designed by the firm

Chamberlin, Powell and Bon was a British firm of architects active during the 1950s and 1960s. They are best known for having designed the Barbican Estate in central London and the campus extension of the University of Leeds.

== Formation ==
The practice was founded in 1952 by Geoffry Powell (1920–1999), Peter "Joe" Chamberlin (1919–1978) and Christoph Bon (1921–1999), following Powell's win in the 1951 architectural competition for the Golden Lane Estate. The three founding partners taught at Kingston Polytechnic (now Kingston University School of Architecture) when they each entered the design competition with the agreement that should any of them win they would form a partnership with the other two to deliver the project.

The Golden Lane Estate is sometimes referred to as the apprentice piece of the practice and is important for its planned landscape which 'straddles the boundary between the picturesque and the formal'.

Charles Greenberg became an additional partner of the practice in 1960, although he chose not to add his name to the partnership for personal reasons. He was the only other partner working with CP&B on the Barbican estate. Frank Woods also became an additional partner, and in 1985 the firm's name became Chamberlin Powell Bon & Woods. The firm continued to 1989. Its archives are held at the Royal Institute of British Architects.

== Main work ==
Following construction of their Golden Lane Estate design, they won the commission to design and execute the adjacent Barbican development, also for the Corporation of the City of London. (The corporation is the wealthy municipal administration that has responsibility for the historic core of London, today its central financial district.) The Barbican was such a large job they set up a sub-practice to deal with it: Chamberlin Powell and Bon (Barbican) Ltd. The firm was strongly influenced by the work and ideas of Swiss/French architect Le Corbusier, with the essence of the innovative design being encapsulated by the project architect Leopold Rubinstein who trained with Le Corbusier in Paris.

It is a measure of the importance of the practice in postwar British architecture that many of their works are now Listed Buildings.

== List of works ==
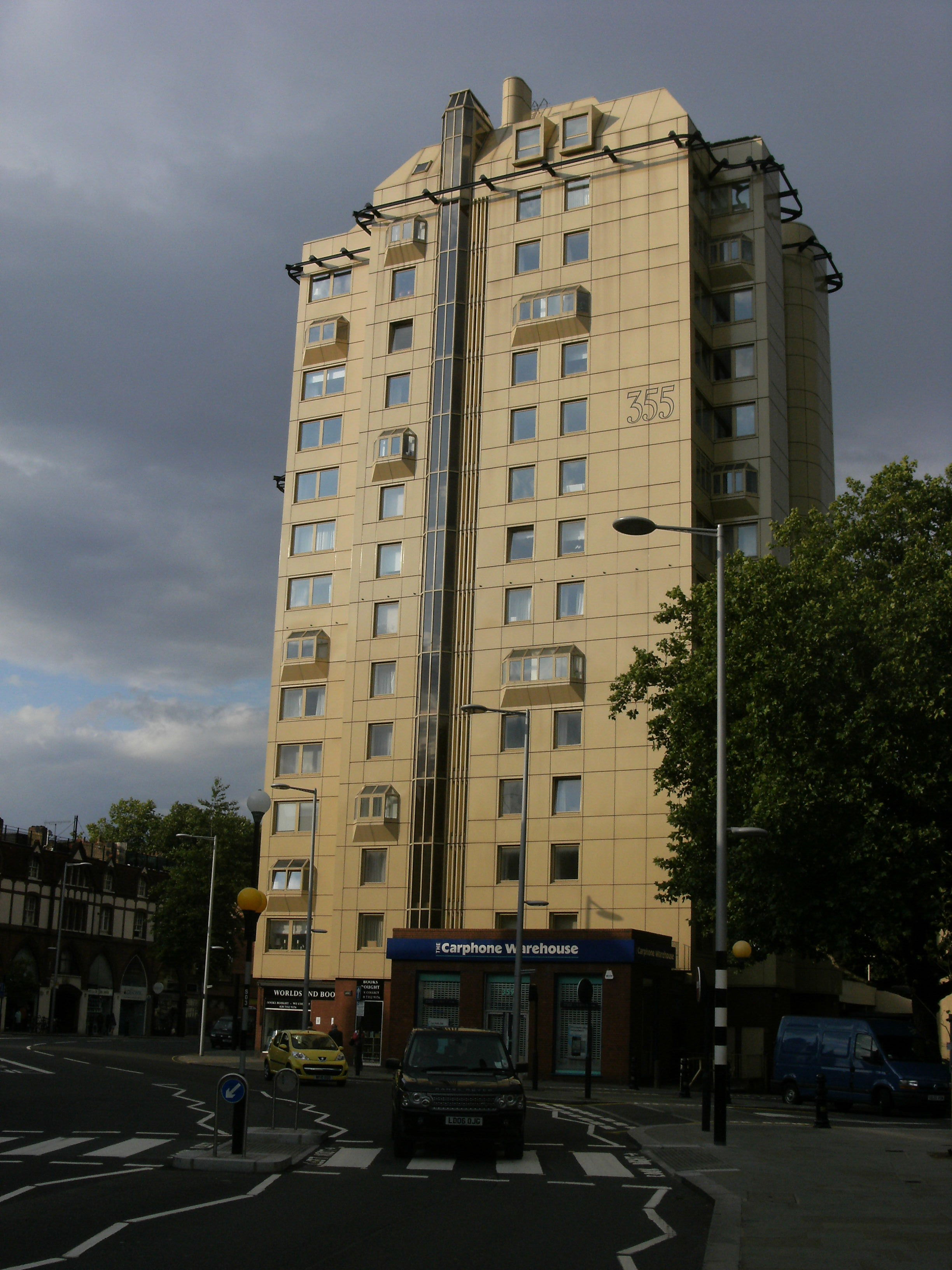
355 Kings Road, one of several residential designs by CP&B

- Golden Lane Estate, Aldersgate, London EC1 1952–1961 (Listed Grade II & Grade II*)
- Milton Court Coroner's Court, weighbridge, flats, offices and fire station for the City of London, designed 1959, demolished amid controversy, 2008.
- Barbican Estate and Barbican Centre for the Arts, London EC2 (Listed G II)
- Vanbrugh Park Estate, Blackheath, London SE3, completed 1963
- Roundshaw Estate, Wallington, Surrey, 1965, completed 1967. Original estate demolished in 2010.
- Two Saints (later Geoffrey Chaucer) School, Harper Road, London SE1 (Listed II* but substantially demolished by Southwark borough council in 2007 for the creation of Globe Academy)
- Development at 355 Kings Road for ILEA
- Bousfield Primary School, The Boltons, Earls Court, London SW5 1954–56 (Listed GII)
- University of Leeds, campus expansion masterplan and many individual buildings (1963–75), the largest collection of buildings by the firm after the Barbican. (Listed G II & G II*)
- University of Birmingham (1966)
- Murray Edwards College, Cambridge (Formerly New Hall, Cambridge). Cambridge University a new college for an ancient university (1962–64, Listed G II*).
- 30a Hendon Avenue, Finchley, London N3, the only private house designed by the practice (Listed G II)
- Of the unrealised works the Zoology Tower for Oxford University, a highly figured 300 ft (91 m) point block which would have been visible all over Oxford.
- Of the demolished buildings the more significant are a Cooper Taber Seed Factory, Witham, Essex, and the Shipley Salt Grammar School, Shipley, West Yorkshire.
- Cheltenham Grammar School, Cheltenham (1965). These buildings were demolished in 1996 (partially owing to the disintegration of the concrete in the 1980s) and replaced on the site by a new campus for what is now Pate's Grammar School.

== Gallery ==
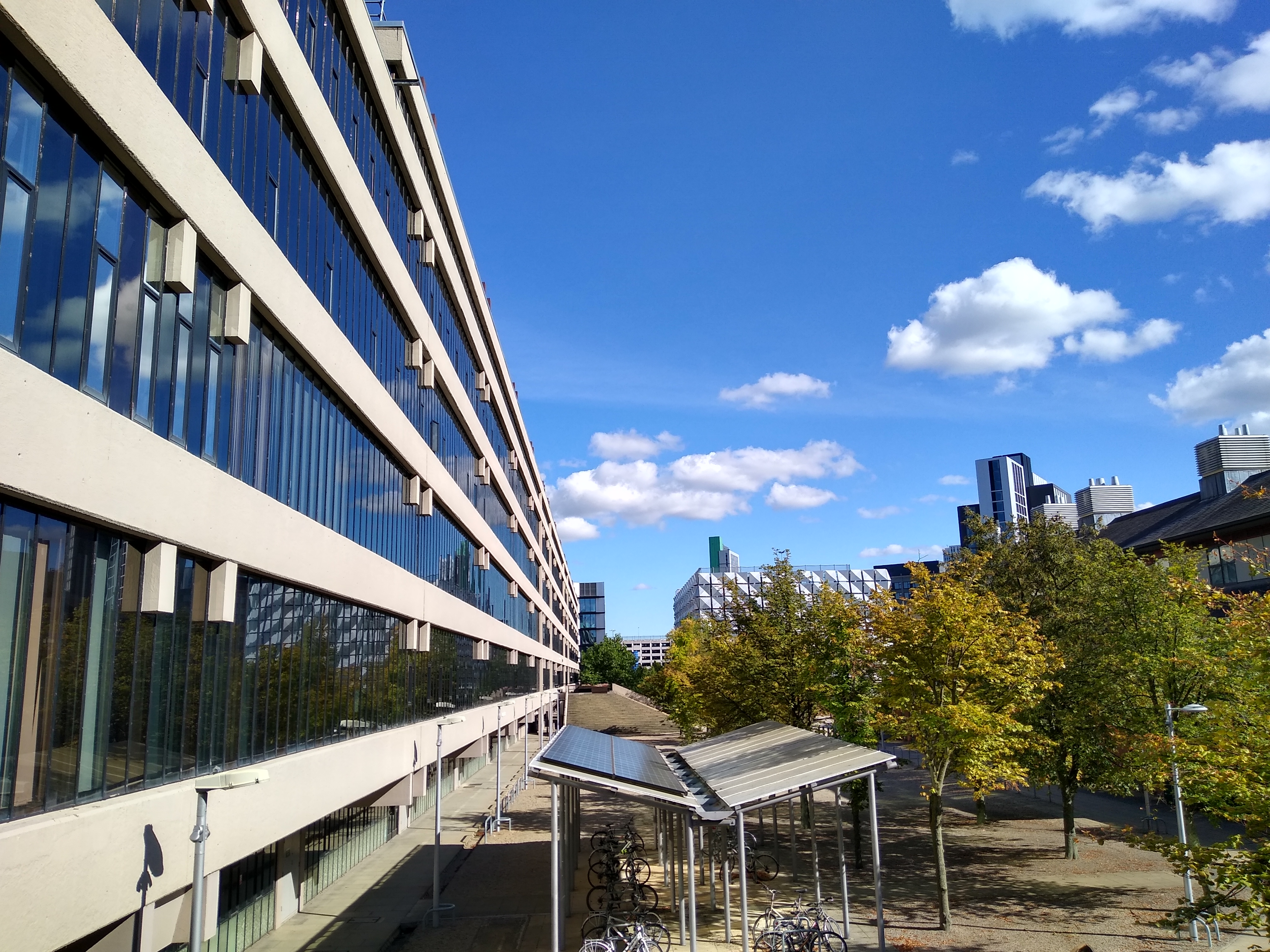
EC Stoner Building

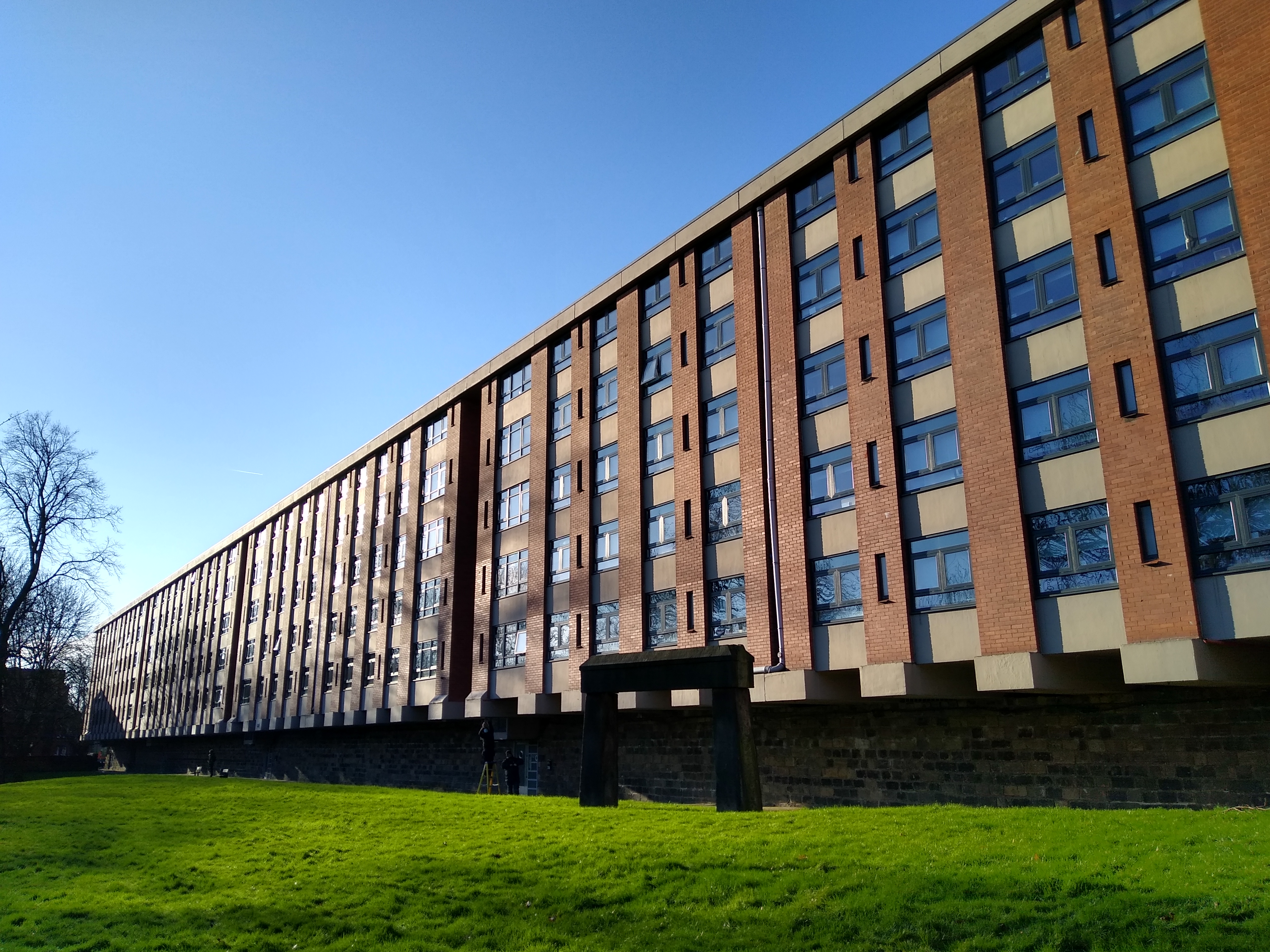
Henry Price Building

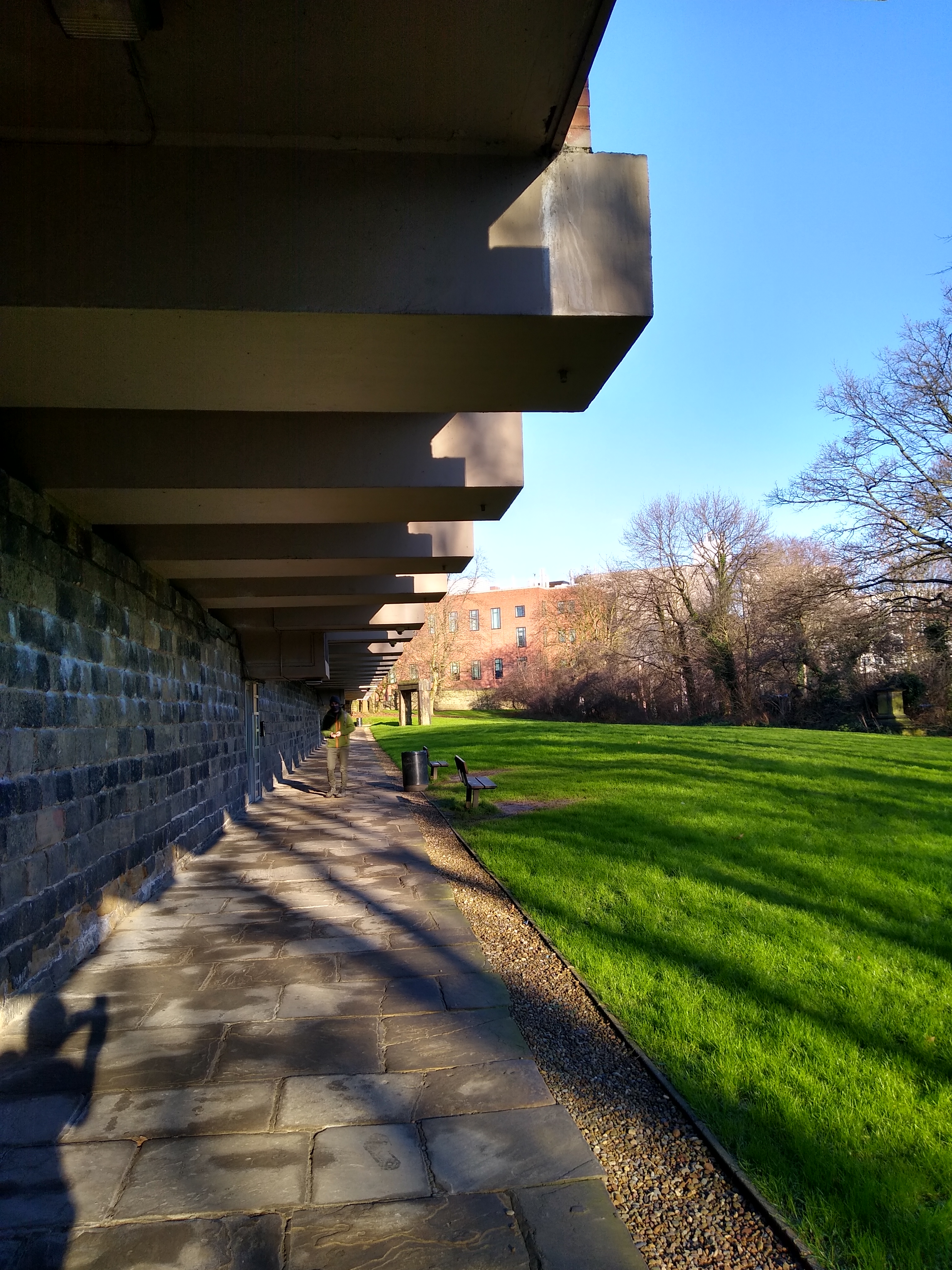
Cantilever of Henry Price Building
