= Ernie Glenn =

English footballer

Personal information
- Full name: Ernest Glenn
- Date of birth: 12 April 1902
- Place of birth: Redditch, England
- Date of death: 25 February 1965
- Place of death: Coventry, England
- Height: 5 ft 9 1/2 in (1.77 m)
- Position: Left back

Senior career*
Years	Team	Apps	(Gls)
- Willenhall Town
1923–1931	Bristol City	276	(0)
- * Club domestic league appearances and goals

Ernest Glenn (12 April 1902 – 25 February 1965) was an English footballer who played as a left back.

== Career ==
Glenn played locally for Willenhall Town. Alex Raisbeck signed Glenn in May 1923 for Bristol City. Glenn made his debut in the Second Division at right back deputising for Dick Hughes in a 1–1 draw against Blackpool on 10 November 1923.

Glenn shared the right back position with Hughes in this first season back in the Second Division making 24 appearances as Bristol City were relegated in 22nd place. He continued at right back playing alongside Hughes in 1924–25 making 35 appearances as Bristol City finished 3rd. The following season Glenn made 33 appearances as the left back with Hughes playing right back. Bristol City won promotion as Third Division South winners again in 1926–27 when Glenn made 37 appearances as the regular left back. Walsh and Glenn formed the regular full back partnership for the next four years as Bristol City struggled in the Second Division twice finishing 20th. Glenn made 41 appearances, 41 appearances, 39 appearances and 26 appearances as the regular left back in these seasons.

Glenn decided to retire in May 1931 after failing to accept new terms offered and being placed on the transfer list. Glenn intended to take over his father's pub in Birmingham and later worked in a Coventry factory.

== Honours ==
with Bristol City

- Football League Third Division South winner: 1926–27
