= John Walshe =

John Walshe may refer to:

- John Walshe (cricketer), Australian cricketer
- John Walshe (MP) for Cricklade
- John Walshe (rugby league), rugby league footballer

== See also ==
- John Walsh (disambiguation)
