= Jonathan Welsh (disambiguation) =

Jonathan Welsh (1947–2005) was a Canadian actor.

Jonathan Welsh may also refer to:

- Jonathan Welsh (American football) (born 1982), American football player

== See also ==
- Jonathon Welch (born 1958), Australian choral conductor and opera singer
- John Welsh (disambiguation)
- Jack Welsh (disambiguation)
