= Welch baronets =

Baronetcy in the Baronetage of the United Kingdom

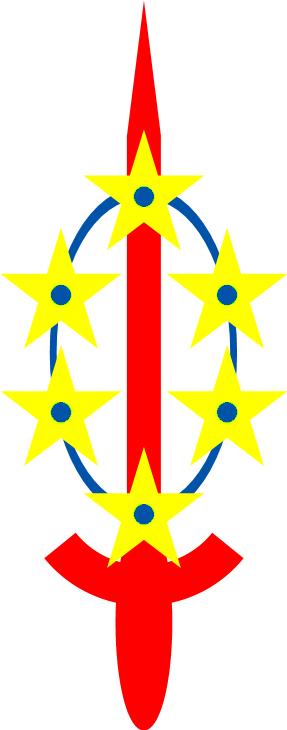
Heraldic badge: A sword erect Gules enfiled by a Circlet of six pierced Mullets Or chained Azure.

The Welch Baronetcy, of Chard in the County of Somerset, is a title in the Baronetage of the United Kingdom. It was created on 16 December 1957 for Sir Cullum Welch, Lord Mayor of London from 1956 to 1957. As of 2023 the baronetcy is held by his grandson, the third Baronet, who succeeded his father in that year.

== Welch baronets, of Chard (1957) ==
- Sir (George James) Cullum Welch, 1st Baronet (1895–1980)
- Sir John Reader Welch, 2nd Baronet (1933–2023)
- Sir James Douglas Cullum Welch, 3rd Baronet (born 1973)

The heir apparent is the present holder's elder son William Reader Cullum Welch (born 2010).

Coat of arms of Welch baronets
Crest An heraldic Antelope’s head erased Or armed Gules gorged with a Collar composed of six pierced Mullets Azure chained also Gules. Escutcheon Or on a fess Gules between six Martlets Azure two Lions passant respectant Or. Motto Ne Cede Arduis
