= Sir John Reader Welch, 2nd Baronet =

British baronet (1933–2023)

Sir John Welch
- Born: 26 July 1933; London, England
- Died: 5 September 2023 (aged 90); London, England
- Education: Hertford College, Oxford
- Occupation: Solicitor
- Spouse: Kerry née Douglass (m. 1962)
- Children: 3
- Honours: Baronet; CStJ

Sir John Reader Welch, 2nd Baronet (26 July 1933 – 5 September 2023) was an English solicitor and baronet.

== Early life ==
Scion of a Somerset gentry family originally of Welsh extraction, the only son of Sir Cullum Welch (1895–1980) and Gertrude née Harrison (1896–1966), he was educated at Marlborough College, before going up to Hertford College, Oxford, graduating BA proceeding MA.

Upon his father's death in 1980, he succeeded to the family baronetcy.

== Career ==
Commissioned into the Royal Signals for National Service (1952–54), Welch saw action at Suez (GSM with Canal Zone Clasp). He then served in the Territorial Army with the Middlesex Yeomanry, being promoted to Captain.

Admitted as a solicitor in 1960, he joined Bell Broderick & Gray becoming partner (1961–71), before moving to Wedlake Bell as a senior partner (1972–96).

His father having served as Lord Mayor of London for 1956/57, Sir John pursued a life in public service. He was elected a Common Councilman for Walbrook 1975–86 and served as Chairman of the City Corporation's Planning and Communications Committee (1981–82).

Registrar of the Archdeanconry of London from 1964 until 1999, he served as Master Parish Clerk, then Master of the Haberdashers' Company for 1990/91.

A Governor of the City of London School for Girls and of Haberdashers' Aske's School, Elstree, Sir John also served as a ceremonial officer of the Order of St John (CStJ).

== Personal life ==
Married to (Margaret) Kerry Douglass on 25 September 1962, Sir John and Lady Welch had issue:

- Margaret Trudy Cullum Welch, born 17 January 1965, married 1992 Anthony Richard Loveys Jervoise FCA, having 3 children.
- Jane Olive Cumrie Welch, born 17 January 1965, married 1992 David Ross Waller (died 2020), having 3 surviving children.
- Sir James Douglass Cullum Welch, 3rd Baronet, born 10 November 1973, married 2009 Heather Mary Jackson, having two sons:
  - William Reader Cullum Welch, born 2010 (heir apparent);
  - Edward Peter Cullum Welch, born 2017.

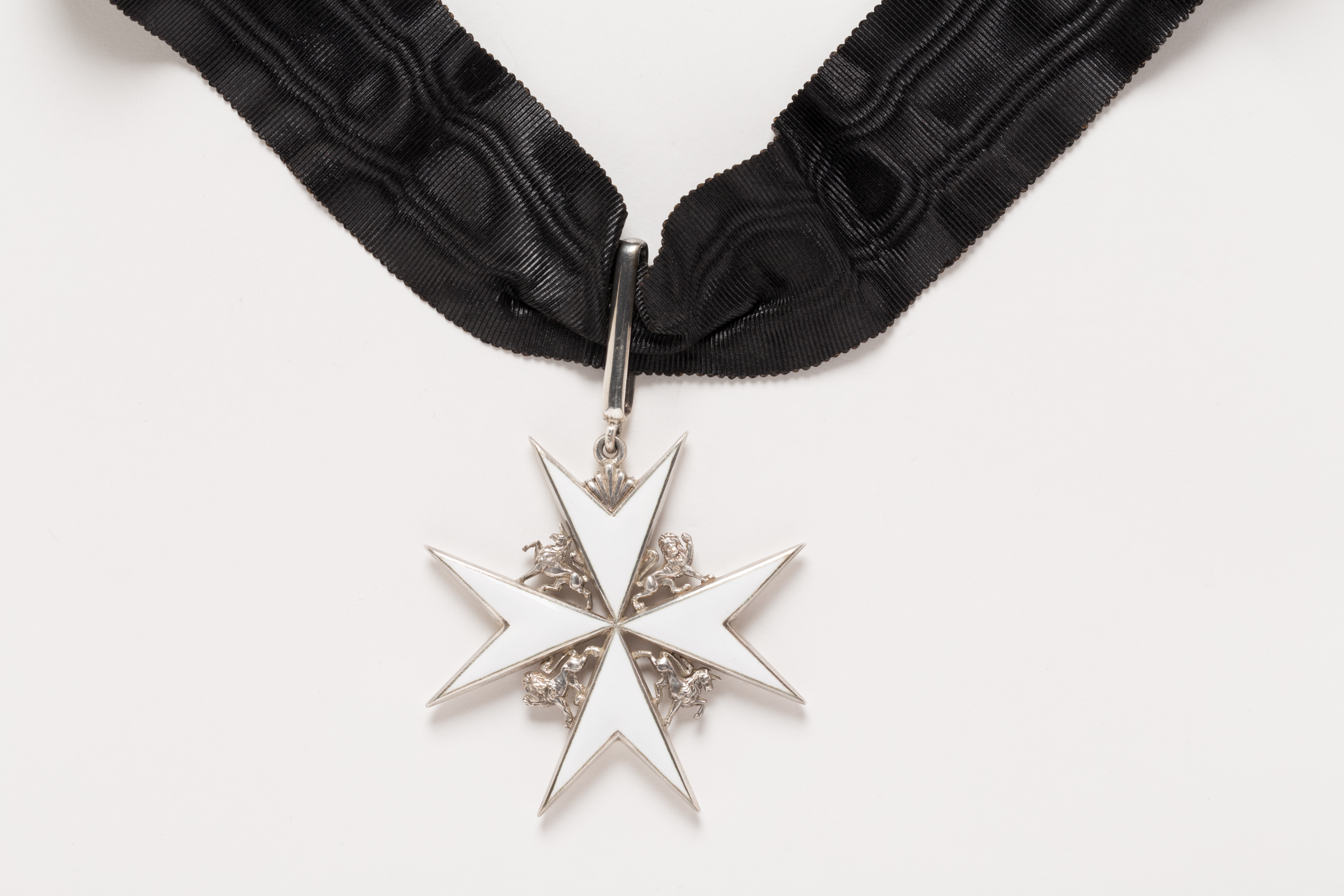
CStJ neck decoration

== Honours ==
- 1980: Baronet
- 1981: Commander of the Most Venerable Order of St John

=== Arms ===
Coat of arms of Sir John Reader Welch, 2nd Baronet
Crest An heraldic Antelope’s Head erased Or armed Gules gorged with a Collar composed of six pierced Mullets Azure chained also Gules Helm That of a Knight: Escutcheon Or on a Fess Gules between six Martlets Azure two Lions passant respectant Or, an Inescutcheon Argent a Sinister Hand erect and apaumée couped at the wrist Gules, for augmentation as a Baronet Motto Ne cede arduis (Latin) (Eng: Do not give in to hardship) Orders Surrounding the Shield, the Circlet of the Order of St John: Other elements As Master Haberdasher, the Company's (dexter) and Welch arms (sinister) could be displayed impaled or accolés: Badge A Sword erect Gules enfiled by a Circlet of six pierced Mullets Or chained Azure:

== See also ==
- Welch baronets

Baronetage of the United Kingdom
Preceded by Sir Cullum Welch; 1st Bt	Baronet (of Chard); 1980–2023	Succeeded by Sir James Welch; 3rd Bt
