= Jack Welsh (footballer, born 1924) =

Australian rules footballer

Personal information
- Full name: Jack Welsh
- Born: 20 October 1924
- Died: 14 April 2012 (aged 87)
- Original team: Yarraville
- Height: 185 cm (6 ft 1 in)
- Weight: 84 kg (185 lb)
- Position: Ruck

Playing career^{1}
| Years | Club | Games (Goals) |
| 1945–49 | Footscray | 29 (12) |
- ^{1} Playing statistics correct to the end of 1949.

Jack Welsh (20 October 1924 – 14 April 2012) was a former Australian rules footballer who played with Footscray in the Victorian Football League (VFL). His son Peter also played for Footscray.
