= Jack Welsh (footballer, born 1906) =

Australian rules footballer, born 1906

Personal information
- Full name: Jack Welsh
- Born: 22 August 1906
- Died: 11 November 1964 (aged 58)
- Original team: Geelong West

Playing career^{1}
| Years | Club | Games (Goals) |
| 1932 | North Melbourne | 12 (2) |
- ^{1} Playing statistics correct to the end of 1932.

Jack Welsh (22 August 1906 – 11 November 1964) was an Australian rules footballer who played with North Melbourne in the Victorian Football League (VFL).
