= John Prendergast Walsh =

Irish soldier (1798–1867)

John Prendergast Walsh (1798–1867) was an Irish born soldier who served in the 95th Regiment as a second-lieutenant during the Battle of Waterloo where he lost a leg. He later became a clergyman but his military background made it difficult for him to find employment in the established Church of England. His financial problems remained with him into his later life.

== Background ==
Walsh’s father and grand-father were Irish clergymen in the Church of Ireland; his great-grandfather was Rev. Philip Walsh (1655-1740) who was the Prebendary of Tipperkevin, Vicar of Blessington, Rector of Ballymore Eustace, County Wicklow and chaplain to Primate Michael Boyle, Archbishop of Armagh.

The men of the Walsh family who did not join the clergy joined the army, and at the age of seventeen John Prendergast Walsh chose the army. He joined the elite 95th rifle regiment as a second lieutenant on 5 May 1814 and just over a year later was fighting at the Battle of Waterloo.

He is buried in St Saviour Churchyard, Jersey in the Channel Islands

== 95th Regiment of Foot ==
The Rifle Corps was formed in about 1800 as an experiment to assess the rifle as a military weapon. The musket was standard issue in the British army at that time, but its limited range meant that engagements had to be at close quarters. The regiment was issued with the Baker rifle that had an accurate range in excess of 200yds. They developed skirmishing tactics that took advantage of this and wore green uniforms with black belts and black buttons that acted as camouflage. In 1802 the regiment was renamed the 95th Regiment of Foot.

Walsh, who had been educated at Trinity and awarded a B.A., joined the 2nd Battalion as a junior officer. At the battle of Waterloo his battalion was positioned with the 52nd and 71st regiments, defending a line adjacent to the Hougoumont Farm. During the battle Walsh's battalion lost 33 killed and over 200 wounded or missing. Walsh, who was in Captain Josh Logan's company, was himself severely wounded and as a result lost a leg. Captain Logan assumed command of the 2nd Battalion after his senior officers, Colonel Norcott and Major Miller, were both wounded.

Walsh remained in the army despite his artificial leg. In 1825, he married Isabella Christian Francis Langton (1801-1888); she was the daughter of Colonel James Langton of Bruree, County Limerick. From records it appears their first four children were born in Mallow, County Cork and this indicates that Walsh may have been based at the military barracks located at Mallow. In 1829 he was retired on half pay but appears to have returned to the army in about 1833. His father, the Rev. John Ravell Walsh (1752-1833) died this same year in Naas, County Kildare, Ireland, aged 81.

== The clergy ==
By 1838 Walsh was being referred to as Reverend J. Prendergast Walsh and had published a treatise called One Catholic & Apostolic Church. In 1840 he was the officiating minister in the Chapel of Ease, Newport in Devon, England, replacing Reverend Henry Gamble who had been unwell for a prolonged period. After about 8 months in the post, the Bishop of Exeter decided that Walsh could no longer officiate. This was due to one of the bye-laws of his diocese that refused a licence to former members of the armed forces. Before this Walsh had been appointed to a curacy in London but was refused a licence by the Bishop of the diocese, allegedly because he was from another country. This was the beginning of a difficult period in his life. With eight children he had a large family to support, and following a further refusal by the Bishop of Norwich he faced bankruptcy.

On 12 October 1845 Walsh was ordained into the Church of Ireland by the Lord Bishop of Derry and Raphoe for the diocese of Derry.

== Bankruptcy ==
At a bankruptcy hearing in June 1847 in the London Insolvent Court, Walsh explained that he had lost several positions in the Church of England due to his army career. Being a war hero of the Battle of Waterloo there was sympathy for him in the court, and several newspapers thought it shameful that he had been treated in this way. He was discharged and allowed to return to his ministry with untainted character.

However, in December of the same year his son, Spencer George Walsh, was convicted for assaulting a shopkeeper who had asked Reverend Walsh for the payment of a debt. The man and his companion had travelled some distance in London to find Walsh who had moved without settling his bill. When they eventually located the new lodging they were invited in but the son remonstrated with them and struck the green-grocer, William Prentice, with a poker.

In 1852 there was a Proclamation of Outlawry declared against Rev John Prendergast Walsh, calling for him to surrender to the Sheriff. The offence was a debt of £203 13s 3d and was heard at the Queen’s Bench on 9 September 1852. In 1857 an article was published in the Cheltenham Mercury - Saturday 31 October 1857 - detailing outstanding debts of a gentleman called Rev. Walsh, identified by a wooden leg and who had fought at Waterloo. A "mob" of town tradesmen had attended his house on 22 September, demanding payment of their outstanding bills. Walsh replied in a letter to the newspaper on 9 November, denying all charges made by the paper and blaming "two or three of the lower order of tradesmen" for the altercation. Two weeks later a letter written by Thomas Blakeman, the secretary of the London Association for the Protection of Trade, was published. His attention had been drawn to these earlier correspondence and he wrote that he had been trying to obtain outstanding debts from Rev Walsh for several years on behalf of his members. He also cited other places where Walsh had lived and where debts were still outstanding; these included Canterbury, Steeple (near Maldon, Essex), Shrewsbury, Oswestry and Wrexham.

== Hoghton ==
In 1860 Walsh was appointed as a relief vicar in Hoghton, Lancashire, in place of the incumbent, Rev. J Shortt, who took leave of absence for the sake of his health. Walsh and his family moved into the rectory in Shortt's absence. The agreement appeared to be for a year, or perhaps longer if Shortt's health did not improve. This lack of clarity led to a misunderstanding between the two clergymen. Shortt wrote that he would return at the end of one year but Walsh rejected this, saying that he was not prepared to relinquish either the position, or the residence of the rectory, until the end of the two year full term. The parishioners expressed their disapproval of Walsh's stance by forming a committee with Thomas Eastwood as chairman. Several accusations were made against Walsh including details of his past financial difficulties. These were all published in the Preston Chronicle in June 1861 in a long article. Walsh responded with a letter/article in the same newspaper that ran to nearly three columns. He refuted many of the accusations and it appeared that Eastman may have been misinformed about some of the events. However, Walsh failed to answer all of the accusations, and this was taken as a sign by Eastman of his guilt. He travelled to Cheltenham and found some of the creditors who were still chasing Walsh for their money. One of them took the opportunity of serving Walsh with a writ for an outstanding bill of £43 15s 9d.

Walsh was evicted from the parsonage and the Bishop of Manchester withdrew his licence to preach. He threatened to sue Eastman and Shortt but this appears to have come to nothing. In 1862 a Rev. J. P. Walsh was appointed to Kittisford, Somerset, following the death of the incumbent Rev. William Tiverton Preedy. This appears to have been John Prendergast Walsh

His grandson, Langton Prendergast Walsh, wrote a book and detailed some information about his grandfather saying that in later life he spent most of the year in Avranches, Normandy, France, returning to England in the summer months.

== Family ==
Walsh and Isabella Christian Francis Langton had ten children; at least three died in infancy and three others died in their early adulthood. Their middle son was Colonel Thomas Prendergast Boles Walsh who served in India. One of their grandchildren was Brigadier-General Mainwaring Ravell Walsh, C.B., C.M.G., M.C.

Walsh's cousins included Major-General Arthur Sandy Stawell Walsh of the Royal Marines whose son was Major-General Arthur Huntly Hill Walsh. A nephew was William Walsh the Bishop of Dover.

== Arms ==
Coat of arms of John Prendergast Walsh
Notes Confirmed by Sir Arthur Vicars, Ulster King of Arms, 16 March 1906. Crest Out of a ducal coronet Or charged with a cross humetee Azure a demi-lion rampant of the last. Escutcheon Azure a lion rampant Argent debruised by a fess per pale of the second and Gules charged with three crosses humettée counterchanged. Motto Noli Irritare Leonem
