= John Welsh (Australian footballer) =

Australian rules footballer

Personal information
- Full name: John R. Welsh
- Born: 5 January 1938 (age 88)
- Original team: Old St Kevin's Collegians
- Height: 183 cm (6 ft 0 in)
- Weight: 79 kg (174 lb)
- Position: Utility

Playing career^{1}
Years	Club	Games (Goals)
1961–63	Essendon	9 (0)
- ^{1} Playing statistics correct to the end of 1963.

John Welsh (born 5 January 1938) is a former Australian rules footballer who played with Essendon in the Victorian Football League (VFL). He later captained Coburg in the Victorian Football Association, was captain-coach of Public Works in the Public Service Association, and coached East Keilor and St Oliver's in the Essendon District Football League.
