= Jack Welch (illustrator) =

Jack Welch (1905 in Cleburne, Texas – 1985) was an American illustrator known for his drawings and gouache paintings of droll family activities and his cover illustrations for The Saturday Evening Post. He was a member of the Society of Illustrators.
