= John P. Walsh (sociologist) =

John P. Walsh is a sociologist and a Professor of Public Policy at Georgia Institute of Technology. His research interests include the study of innovation, sociology of science and the sociology of work and organizations.

== Selected publications ==
- Seokkyun Woo; John P. Walsh (2024). Vincent Larivière (ed.). "On the shoulders of fallen giants: What do references to retracted research tell us about citation behaviors?". Quantitative Science Studies. 5 (1): 1–30. doi:10.1162/QSS_A_00303. ISSN 2641-3337. Wikidata Q136505230.
- 2012. Shibayama, Sotaro, John P. Walsh and Yasunori Baba. "Academic Entrepreneurship and Exchange of Scientific Resources: Material Transfer in Life and Material Sciences in Japanese Universities." American Sociological Review 77(5): 804-830.
- 2011. John P. Walsh and HONG Wei. "A review on technology transfer systems in American universities." [In Chinese]. Studies in Science of Science 29(5): 641-649.
- 2010. Tang, Li and John P. Walsh. "Bibliometric fingerprints: name disambiguation based on approximate structure equivalence of cognitive maps." Scientometrics 84(3): 763-784.
- 2010. Clark, Jennifer, Hsin-I Huang and John P. Walsh. "A typology of 'innovation districts': what it means for regional resilience." Cambridge Journal of Regions, Economy and Society 3(1): 121-137.
- 2010. Baba, Yasunori and John P. Walsh. "Embeddedness, social epistemology and breakthrough innovation: the case of the development of statins." Research Policy 39(4): 511-522.
- 2010. No, Yeonji and John P. Walsh. "The Importance of Foreign-Born Talent for US Innovation." Nature Biotechnology 28(3): 289-291.
- 2009. Hong, Wei and John P. Walsh. Forthcoming. "For Money or Glory?: Commercialization, Competition and Secrecy in the Entrepreneurial University." Sociological Quarterly 50:145-171.
- 2008. Cohen, W.M. and J.P. Walsh. "Real impediments to biomedical research." Innovation Policy and the Economy 8:1-30.
- 2008. Walsh, John P., Yasunori Baba, Akira Goto, Yoshihito Yasaki. 2008. "Promoting University-Industry Linkages in Japan: Faculty Responses to a Changing Policy Environment." Prometheus 26: 39-54.
- 2007. Walsh, John P., Wesley M. Cohen and Charlene Cho. "Where excludability matters: material versus intellectual property in academic biomedical research." Research Policy 36:1184-1203.
- 2007. Walsh, J.P. and N.G. Maloney. "Collaboration Structure, Communication Media and Problems in Scientific Work Teams." Journal of Computer-Mediated Communication 12(2), article 19.
