= Barbican Estate =

Residential complex in London, England

Coordinates: 51°31′09″N 0°05′38″W

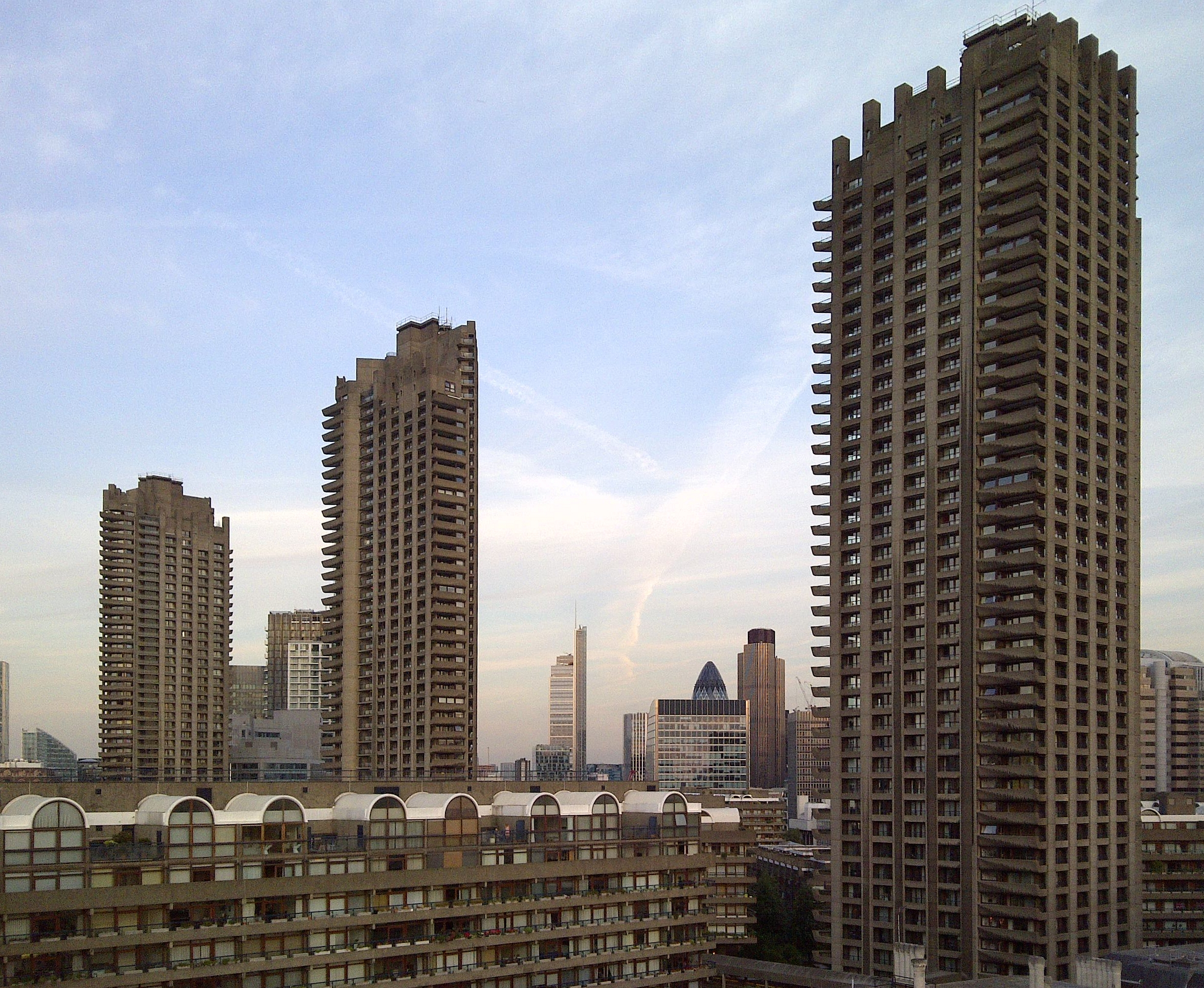
- Barbican Towers

General information
- Type: Mixed-use development
- Architectural style: Brutalist
- Location: London, England

Design and construction
- Architecture firm: Chamberlin, Powell and Bon
- Structural engineer: Ove Arup & Partners
- Civil engineer: Ove Arup & Partners
- Designations: Grade II listed

Website
- Official website

The Barbican Estate, or Barbican, is a residential complex of around 2,000 flats, maisonettes and houses in central London, within the City of London. It is in an area once devastated by World War II bombings and densely populated by financial institutions, 1.4 miles (2.2 km) north east of Charing Cross. Originally built as rental housing for middle and upper-middle-class professionals, it remains an upmarket residential estate. It contains, or is adjacent to, the Barbican Centre, the Museum of London, the Guildhall School of Music and Drama, the Barbican public library, the City of London School for Girls and a YMCA (now closed), forming the Barbican Complex.

The Barbican Complex is a prominent example of British brutalist architecture and is Grade II listed as a whole, with the exception of the former Milton Court, which once contained a fire station, medical facilities and some flats but was demolished to allow the construction of a new apartment tower—named The Heron—which also provides additional facilities for the Guildhall School of Music and Drama.

== History ==
The Cripplegate fort can be seen at the northern edge of Roman London

The main fort of Roman London was built between 90 and 120 AD south-east of where the Museum of London now stands at the corner of London Wall and Aldersgate Street. Around 200 AD, walls were built around the city that incorporated the old fort, which became a grand entrance known as Cripplegate. The word barbican comes from the Low Latin word Barbecana, which referred to a fortified outpost or gateway, such as an outer defence of a city or castle or any tower situated over a gate or bridge that was used for defence purposes. In this case there seems to have been a Roman specula or watchtower in front of the fort from numbers 33–35 onwards on the north side of the street formerly called Barbican (now the west end of Beech St), which was later incorporated into the fortifications north of the wall. The Normans called it the Basse-cour or Base Court, synonymous with the modern word "bailey" and still applied to the outer courtyard of Hampton Court Palace.

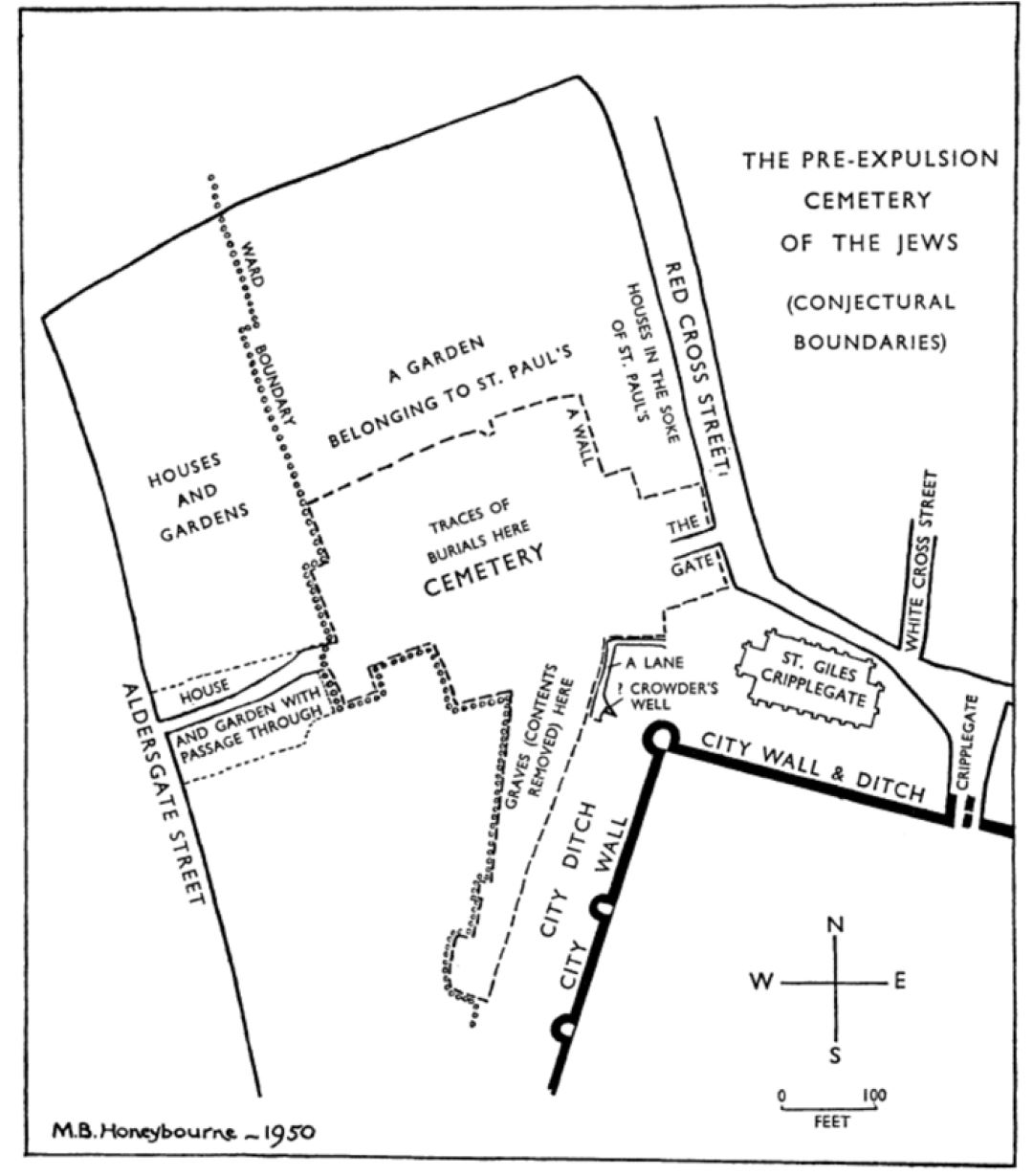
Medieval London Jewish cemetery

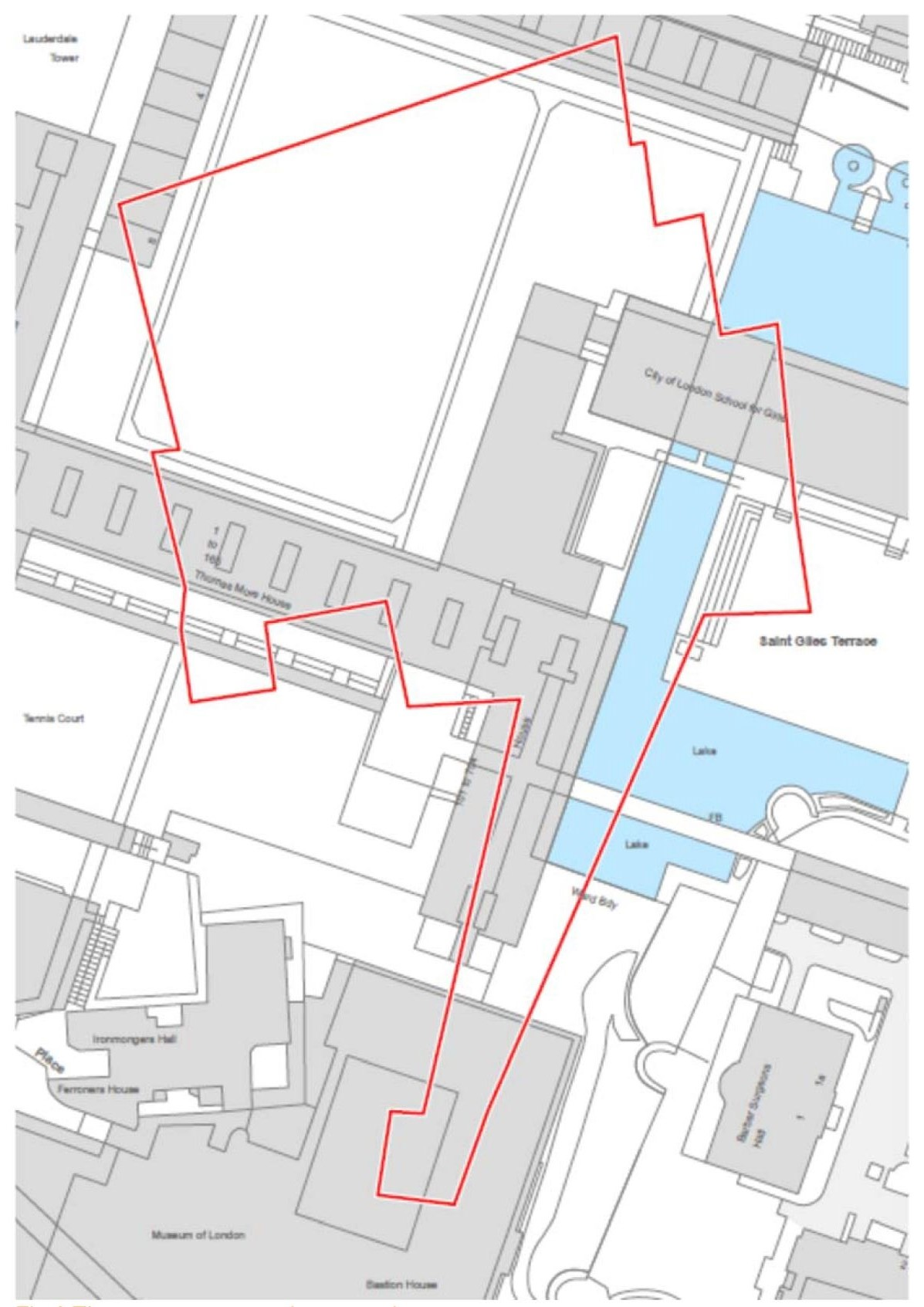
Jewish Cemetery overlaid on modern mapping of the Barbican Estate

The Base Court continued to serve a military function during the reign of Edward I, but Edward III gave it to Robert d'Ufford, 1st Earl of Suffolk, who made it his London home. By the 16th century it had passed to Charles Brandon, 1st Duke of Suffolk. Brandon married his ward Catherine Willoughby, daughter of María de Salinas, who had been a confidante and lady-in-waiting of Catherine of Aragon, and after his death the building was retained by the Willoughby family. The original Base Court seems to have been destroyed and the large building that replaced it was called Willoughby House, a name revived for part of the modern development. The house was later owned by Thomas Egerton, Lord Ellesmere, and later named Bridgewater House after the title bestowed on John Egerton in 1617.

The Barbican terrace blocks and residences, including the green garden in the centre, are laid on an area just outside the city fortifications, to the north west of the surviving London Wall and bastions. Most of the residences and the green square, as well as some of the area to the south, currently occupied by the Museum of London, are on an area that was previously the cemetery serving the London Jewish community before their expulsion. Records of transactions of the time show that the cemetery had been expanded several times through the acquisition of property by Jews between 1268 and 1290. The Jews were expelled from England in 1290, and on 12 July 1291 Edward I granted the site of the cemetery to Master William de Montford, who was Dean of St Paul's but seems to have held this land privately. Archaeological excavations were undertaken on part of the cemetery site prior to construction of the Barbican and the results of these investigations were published in Transactions of the Jewish Historical Society of England (JHSE) in 1961.

=== Post-war development ===
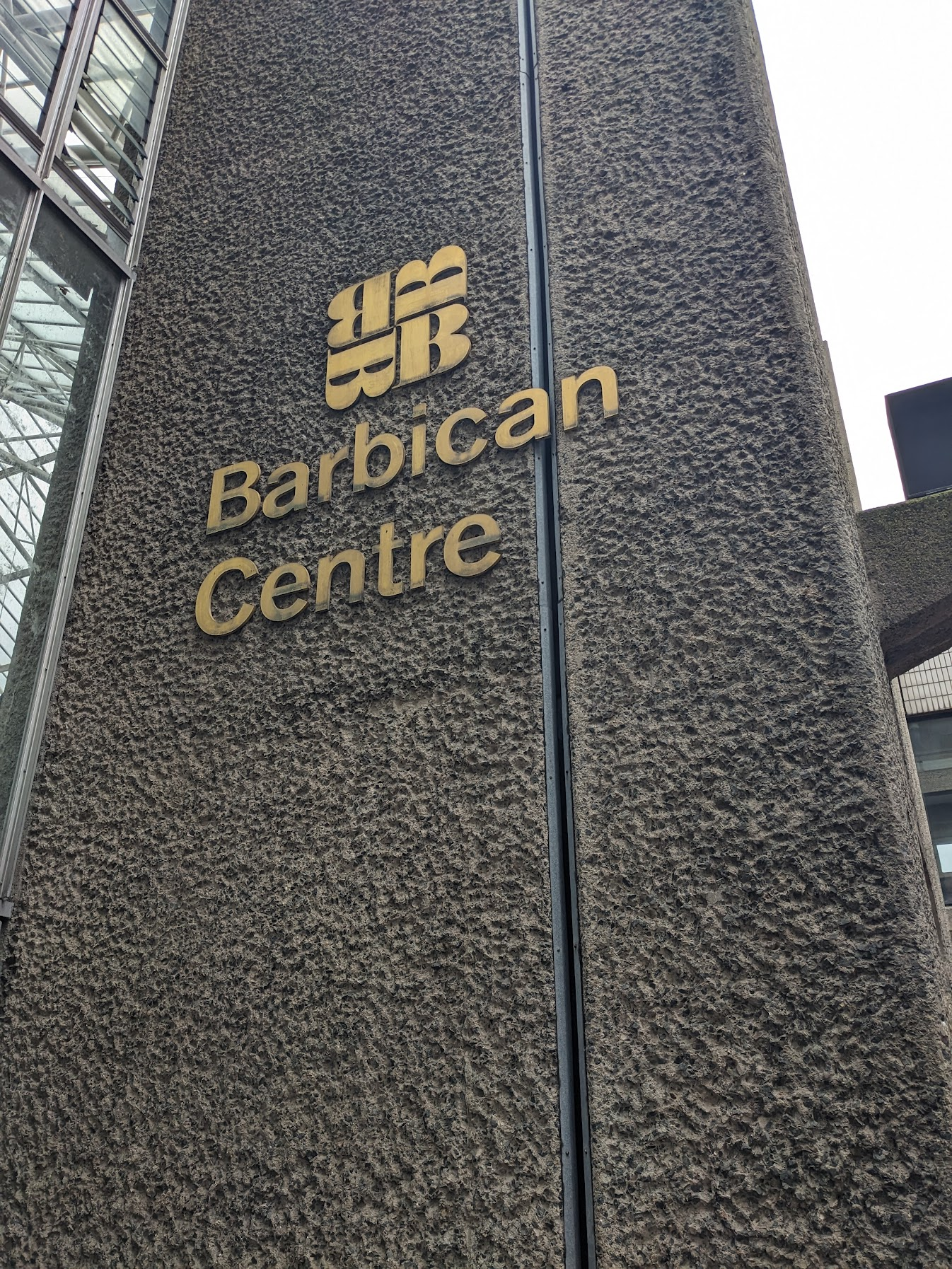
The signature concrete texture was jackhammered at considerable labour cost to achieve the distressed effect of older stonework and to reveal the aggregate.

During World War II the City suffered serious damage and loss of life. The Cripplegate ward was virtually demolished and by 1951 the resident population of the City stood at 5,324, of whom 48 lived in Cripplegate. Discussions began in 1952 about the future of the site, and the decision to build new residential properties was taken by the Court of Common Council on 19 September 1957.

To accommodate the estate, 500 metres (550 yards) of the Metropolitan line was realigned between Barbican and Moorgate stations between 1963 and 1965.

This Barbican Estate brochure from the late 1970s, produced by the Corporation of London, shows the envisaged target market for the flats.

The estate was built between 1965 and 1976, on a 35-acre (14 ha) site. The complex was designed by architects Chamberlin, Powell and Bon, whose first work was the ground-breaking Golden Lane Estate immediately north of the Barbican. Unlike its northern neighbour, however, the Barbican Estate was not social housing. Rather, it was designed and built for affluent City professionals and their families, with all flats let out at commercial rents by the Corporation of London. To help let out the flats, brochures were produced advertising the Barbican Estate as containing the perfect residences for well-heeled professionals and international businesspeople.

Indeed, in its early years, a substantial number of high-profile politicians, lawyers, judges and bankers made their home here (see famous residents).

The Barbican was never 'council housing' in the conventional sense, since flats were targeted at professionals and let at 'market' rents, i.e. for similar prices to equivalent private homes in Central London. It was, however, owned and managed by the Corporation of the City of London, considered a local authority under the Housing Act 1980. This meant that Right to Buy applied to it, and, as a result, almost all flats are now privately owned, although a few continue to be let out by the City of London at market (non-subsidised) rents.

The first building on the 40-acre (16 ha) estate, Speed House, was officially opened in 1969, though extensive industrial disputes in the 1970s led to the last building, Shakespeare Tower, being completed only in 1976. It is now home to around 4,000 people living in 2,014 flats. The flats reflect the widespread use in Britain in the 1960s and 1970s of concrete as the visible face of the building. The complex is also characterised by its total separation of vehicles from pedestrians throughout the area ("slab urbanism"). This is achieved through the use of 'highwalks'—walkways of varying width and shape, usually 1 to 3 storeys above the surrounding ground level. Most pedestrian circulation takes place on these highwalks whilst roads and car-parking spaces are relegated to the lower level.

The Minister for the Arts, Tessa Blackstone, announced in September 2001 that the Barbican complex was to be Grade II listed. At this point there was a growing desire to start demolishing the brutalist 1960s and 1970s structures in British cities, with the flotation in the 1990s of the idea of an "x" listing for buildings to be demolished at the earliest opportunity. This was greeted with dismay by the various architects associations, and by the Labour-run authorities that had been primarily responsible for the building of many of the structures. It has been designated a site of special architectural interest for its scale, its cohesion and the ambition of the project. The complex is architecturally important as it is one of London's principal examples of concrete brutalist architecture and considered a landmark.

Various garden features punctuate the brutalist architecture, including a community-run wildlife garden. The heating and cooling for the homes and buildings of the estate is provided from a central district heating system called "Citigen" which is more efficient and avoid the chimneys and outdoor equipment of a conventional system.

== Blocks and towers ==
The residential estate consists of four tower blocks, 14 terrace blocks, two mews and The Postern, Wallside and Milton Court.

=== Barbican Podium ===
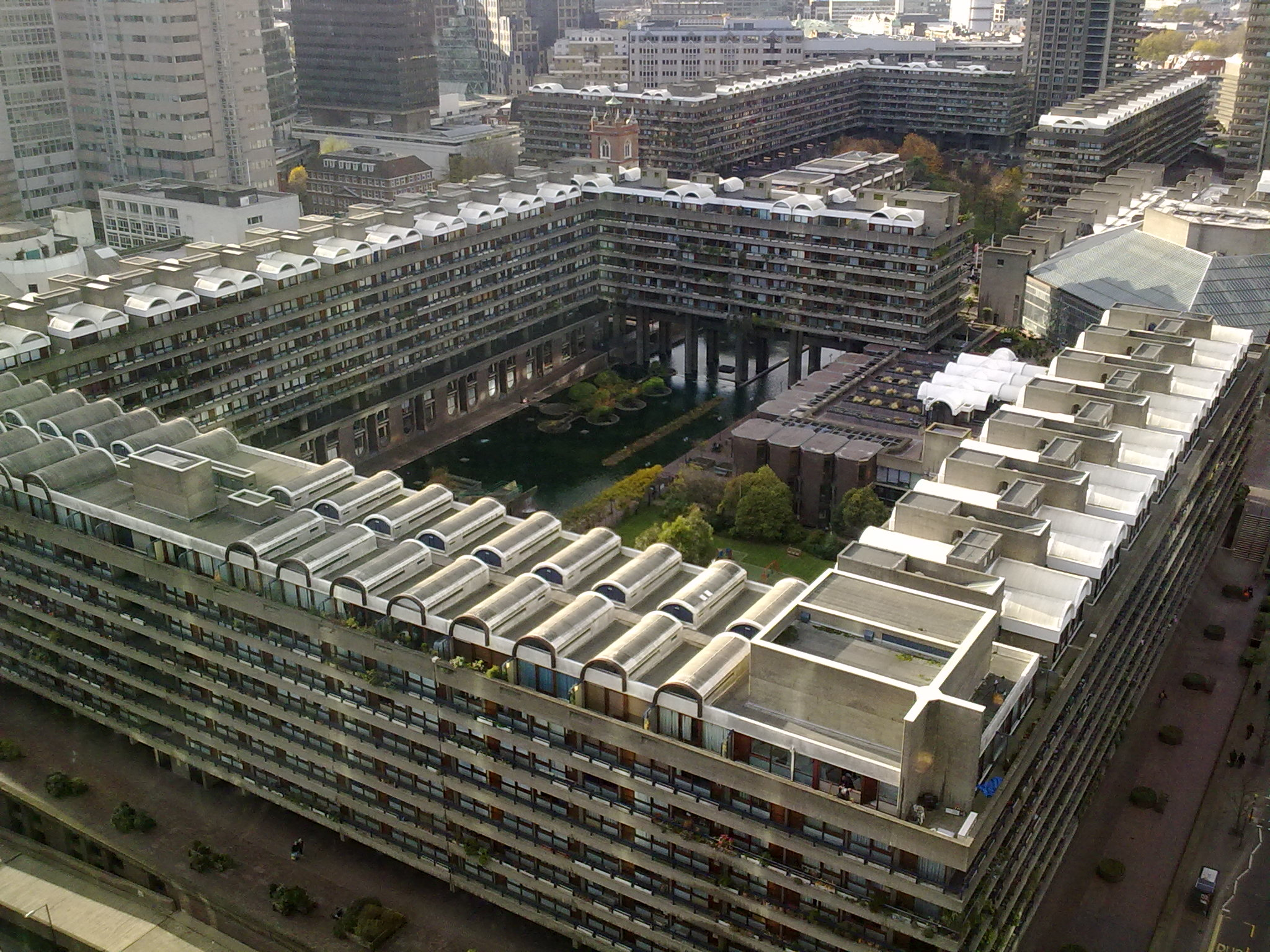
Part of the estate viewed from above

The Barbican Podium is the raised ground level and public space of the Barbican Estate. In 2021, the podium deck was leaking into the Exhibition Halls and other the buildings below, thus repairs were beginning to be planned.

The terrace blocks are grouped around a lake and green squares. The main buildings rise up to seven floors above a podium level, which links all the facilities in the Barbican, providing a pedestrian route above street level. Some maisonettes are built into the podium structure. There is no vehicular access within the estate, but there are some car parks at its periphery. Public car parks are located within the Barbican Centre.

=== The terrace blocks ===
The terrace blocks are named:

- Andrewes House – named after Lancelot Andrewes the 16th-century English bishop and scholar
- Breton House – named after Nicholas Breton, the 16th-century English poet and novelist
- Bryer Court – named after W. Bryer & Sons gold refiners and assayers premises were Numbers 53 and 54 and demolished to make way for the building
- Bunyan Court – named after John Bunyan, the 17th-century English writer and Baptist preacher
- Defoe House – named after Daniel Defoe, the English novelist and spy
- Frobisher Crescent – named after Martin Frobisher, English seaman and privateer
- Gilbert House – named after Sir Humphrey Gilbert, English adventurer and privateer
- Ben Jonson House – named after Ben Jonson, the English playwright, poet and actor
- Thomas More House – named after Sir Thomas More, English lawyer, statesman and social philosopher and saint in the Catholic Church
- Mountjoy House – named after Christopher Mountjoy, the French wig-maker who let a room to William Shakespeare
- Seddon House – named after George Seddon, English cabinetmaker
- Speed House – named after John Speed, English cartographer and explorer
- John Trundle Court – named after John Trundle, a London publisher and bookseller
- Willoughby House – named after Catherine Willoughby English noblewoman and courtier

=== Tower blocks ===
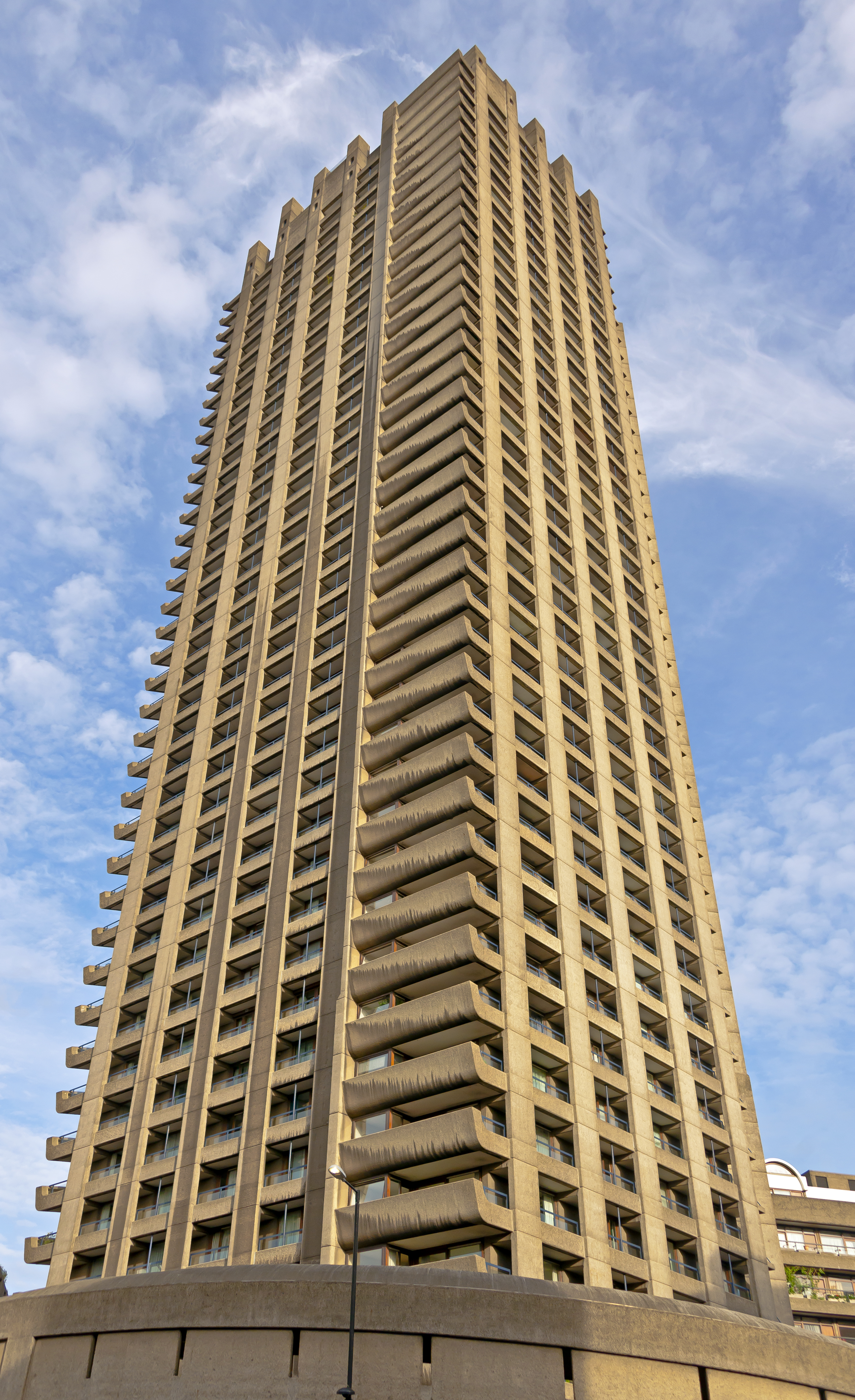
Lauderdale Tower

The estate also contains three of London's tallest residential towers, at 42 storeys and 123 metres (404 ft) high. The top two or three floors of each block comprise three penthouse flats. The towers are:

- Cromwell Tower, completed in 1973 – named after Oliver Cromwell
- Lauderdale Tower, completed in 1974 – named after the Earls of Lauderdale
- Shakespeare Tower, completed in 1976 – named after William Shakespeare
- Blake Tower, completed in 1971 – named after William Blake. Originally a YMCA but was converted to flats in 2015

Once the tallest residential towers in London, they were surpassed by the Pan Peninsula development on the Isle of Dogs.

== Barbican complex ==
The Barbican Estate also contains the Barbican Centre (an arts, drama and business venue), the Barbican public library, the City of London School for Girls, the Museum of London, and the Guildhall School of Music and Drama. A YMCA building was constructed between 1965 and 1968 to link the Barbican and Golden Lane Estate; it is also listed. In 2015–16, the YMCA building was converted by Redrow Homes into a new residential block called Blake Tower with 74 flats run as part of the Barbican Estate.

The Barbican complex also is centered around St Giles Cripplegate, which survived the bombings of World War 2. Remnants of the London Wall, built in Roman era can be seen from the balconies of apartments and in the park area.

== Notable residents ==
The Barbican has had a number of well-known residents throughout its history, especially in the years immediately after it was completed, when it was considered one of the most prestigious residential developments in London. Notable residents have included:

- Broadcaster Robert Elms currently lives there and speaks about the estate on his BBC Radio London show. His wife has an Instagram account dedicated to the views from the flat.
- Conservative Cabinet Minister Norman Tebbit, who lived in a house on Wallside with his wife until the 1984 Brighton hotel bombing
- Leader of the Labour Party John Smith, who lived in Cromwell Tower with his family until his death in 1994
- Former leader of the National Union of Mineworkers Arthur Scargill
- Former Prime Minister of Pakistan Benazir Bhutto
- Andrew Bruce, 11th Earl of Elgin
- Film and theatre director Sir Peter Hall
- Footballer George Best
- Investment adviser, commentator and author Bob Beckman
- Author, journalist, and broadcaster Brian Redhead
- Senior British judge and Master of the Rolls John Donaldson and his wife, the first female Lord Mayor of London Mary Donaldson
- Artist Sir Michael Craig-Martin
- Newspaper cartoonist Frank Dickens
- Journalist and political activist S. W. Alexander
- Writer and conservationist Robert Aickman lived in Willoughby House until 1977
- Nickie Aiken, Conservative MP
- Economist Christopher Bliss, FBA

== In popular culture ==
=== Film ===
The final scene of the 1983 vampire film, The Hunger, directed by Tony Scott and starring David Bowie, Catherine Deneuve and Susan Sarandon, was filmed in Cromwell Tower. The estate's Shakespeare Tower is featured in the 2000 film Gangster No. 1 as the home of the two main characters. This is an anachronism, as the film begins in 1968 and the tower was not constructed until 1976. The Barbican towers can be seen in a sequence from the 1975 Disney film One of Our Dinosaurs Is Missing, an unintentional anachronism for a film set in the 1920s. The Barbican was also used to represent the MI6 headquarters in the James Bond film Quantum of Solace. The estate appears in The Fourth Protocol (1987).

=== Television ===
The estate's Lauderdale Tower is home to fictional character Alice Morgan, a psychopathic murderer, in the BBC series Luther. Morgan lives in a sparsely furnished minimalist apartment on one of the tower's upper floors. The estate is featured in several scenes of the Apple TV show Slow Horses. The show is focused on a group of MI5 agents working in Slough House based at 126 Aldersgate Street, which is opposite the Barbican Estate.

In the 2024 American TV series The Agency, Michael Fassbender's character, a CIA operative known only by his codename, Martian, lives in Lauderdale Tower. The estate is featured in several scenes of the Star Wars TV show Andor. The brutalist complex was used as the backdrop for the fictional city world of Coruscant.

=== Literature ===
The Barbican features in Michael Paraskos's novel In Search of Sixpence as the home of the lead character, Geroud, and also a bar called "The Gin Bar" loosely based on the Gin Joint bar at the Barbican Centre. Clive James's 1987 novel The Remake also used the Barbican as a major setting. The titular skyscraper in J. G. Ballard's novel High Rise (and subsequent film) is largely inspired by the Barbican Estate's towers.

=== Music ===
A promotional video for "Concrete and Clay", a single recorded by British pop band Unit 4 + 2, was filmed in 1965 on the construction site of the Barbican Estate. The film offers of a view of the immediate and surrounding areas of the complex prior to its completion. Various shots of the Barbican towers are shown on the inner record cover of the 1979 album Real to Real Cacophony by the Scottish rock band Simple Minds. The Barbican Estate is mentioned by name in the intro to British band Saint Etienne's song "Language Lab", from their 2002 Finisterre album. The estate is prominently featured in the music videos of Skepta's "Shutdown", Harry Styles' "As It Was" and Vegyn’s "A Dream Goes On Forever".

== Nearby rail and Tube ==
Public Transport
Service	Station/Stop	Line/Route
National Rail	Liverpool Street	
National Rail	Farringdon	
National Rail	Moorgate	
London Underground	Liverpool Street	Central line Circle line Hammersmith & City Metropolitan line Elizabeth line
London Underground	Barbican	Circle line Hammersmith & City Metropolitan line
London Underground	Moorgate	Northern line (city branch) Circle line Hammersmith & City Metropolitan line
London Underground	St Paul's	Central line
London Underground	Farringdon	Circle line Hammersmith & City Metropolitan line Elizabeth line

== Gallery ==
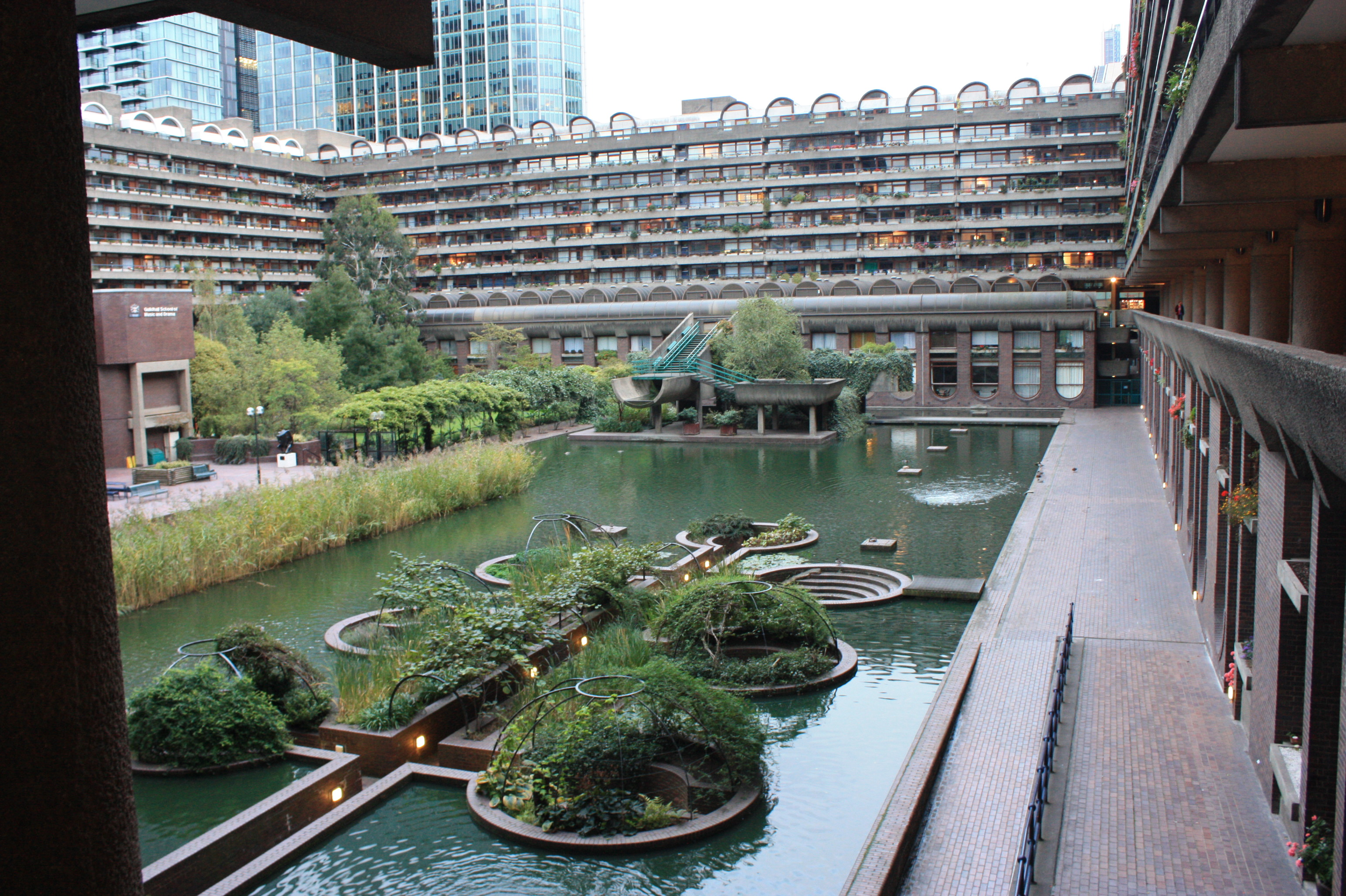
Central ponds, Barbican Estate

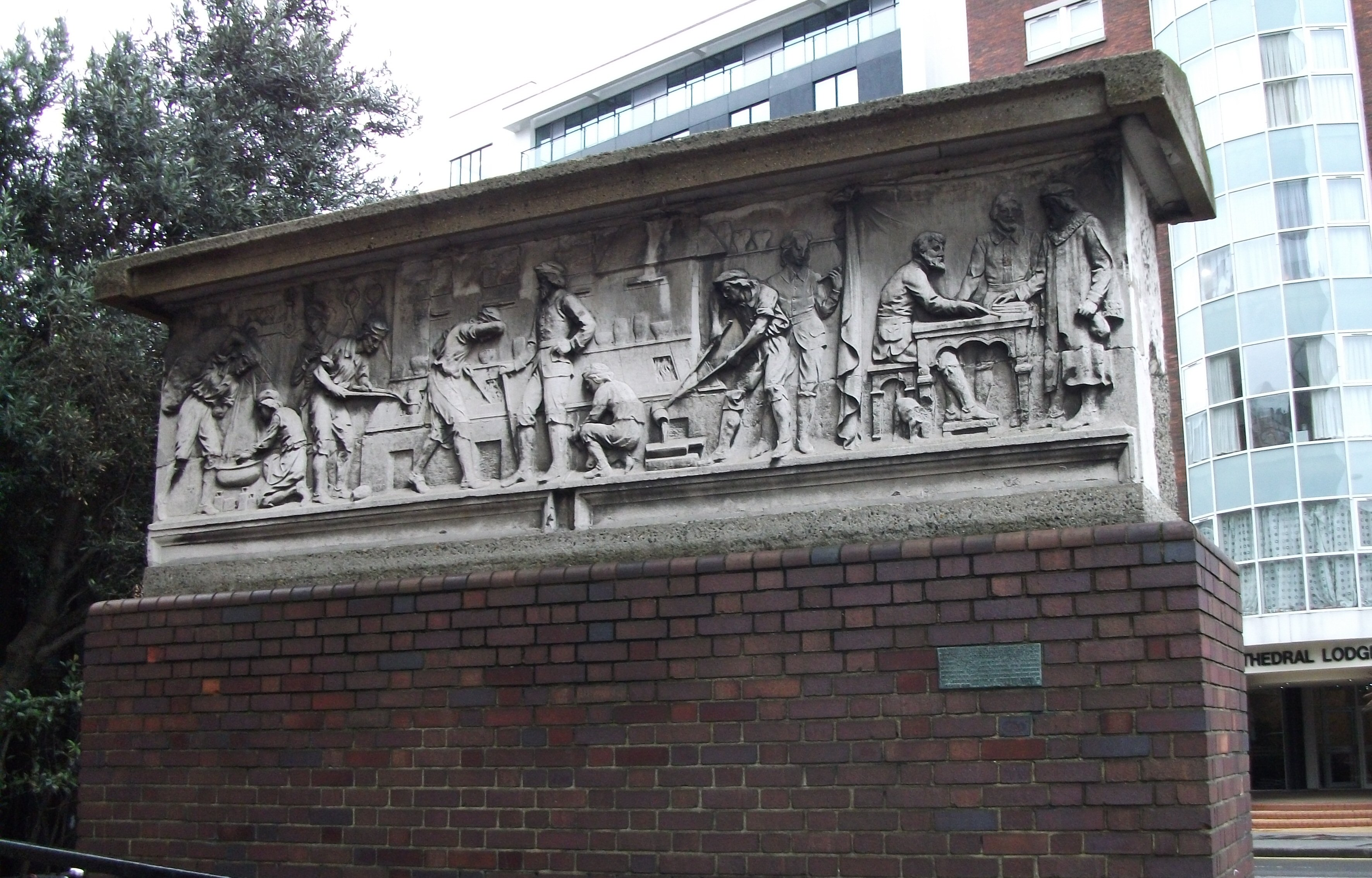
Frieze from Bryers and Sons building (53–54 Barbican), preserved as a monument

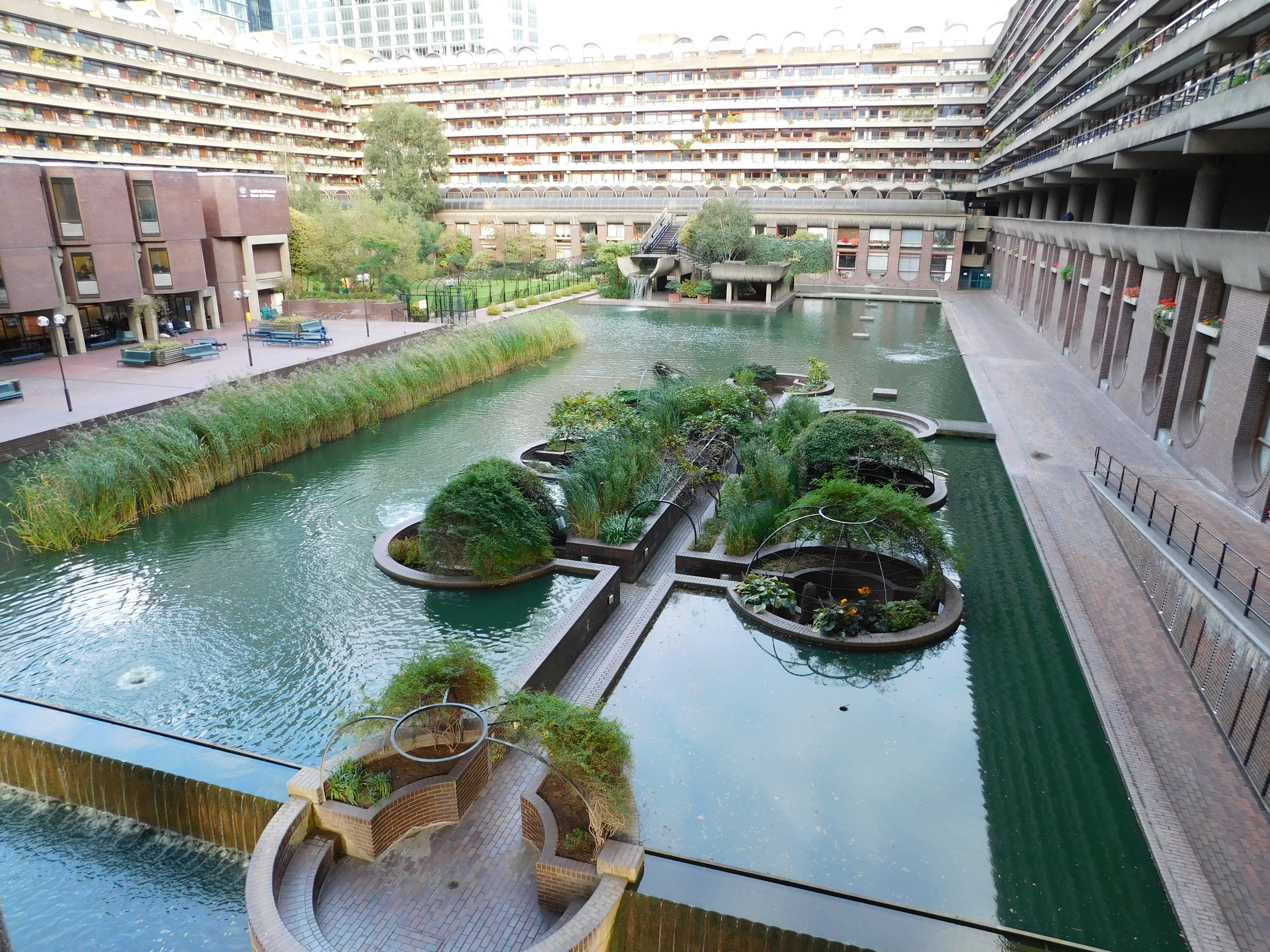
A pond features pathways under the water level.

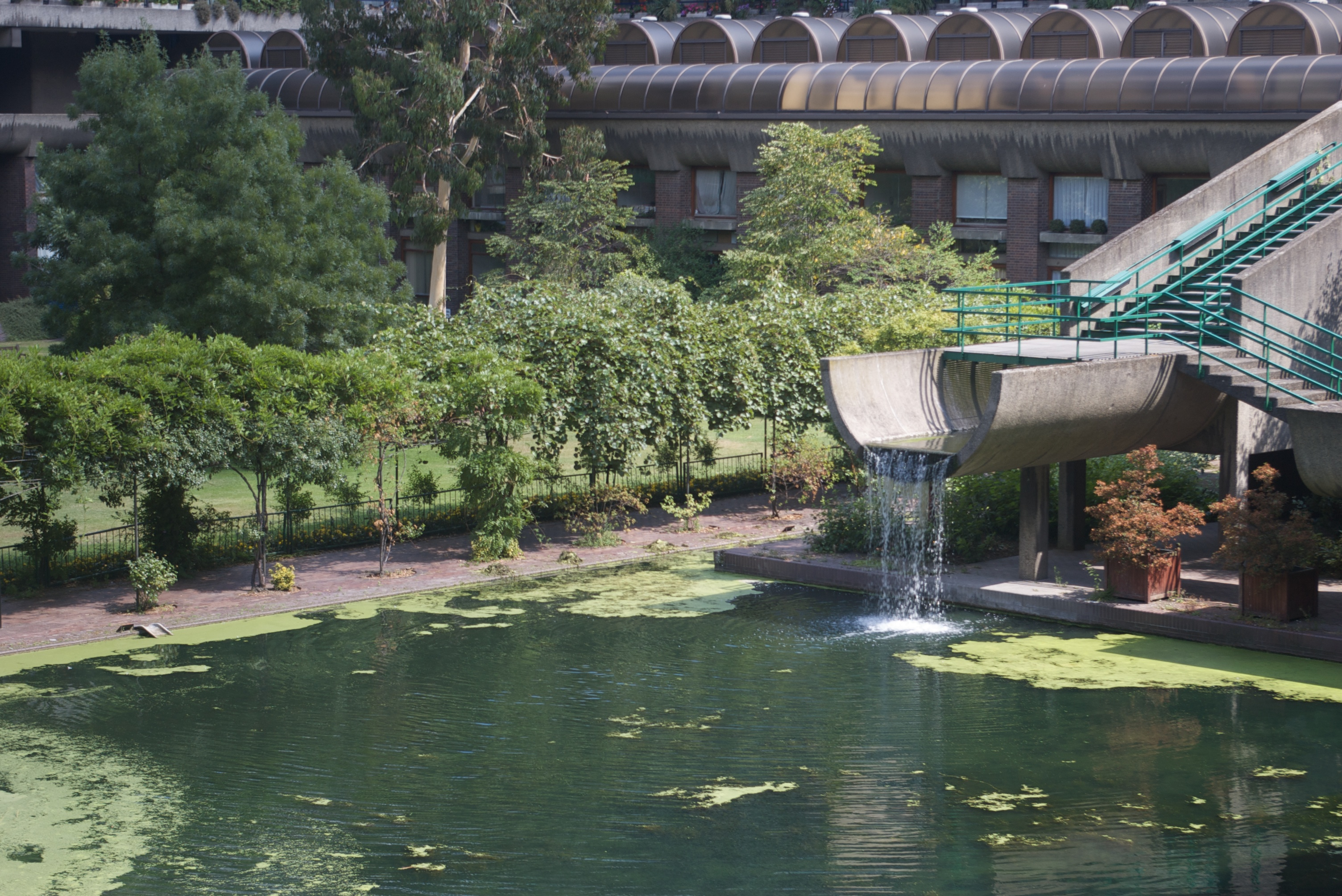
Pond scum has accumulated in a pond.

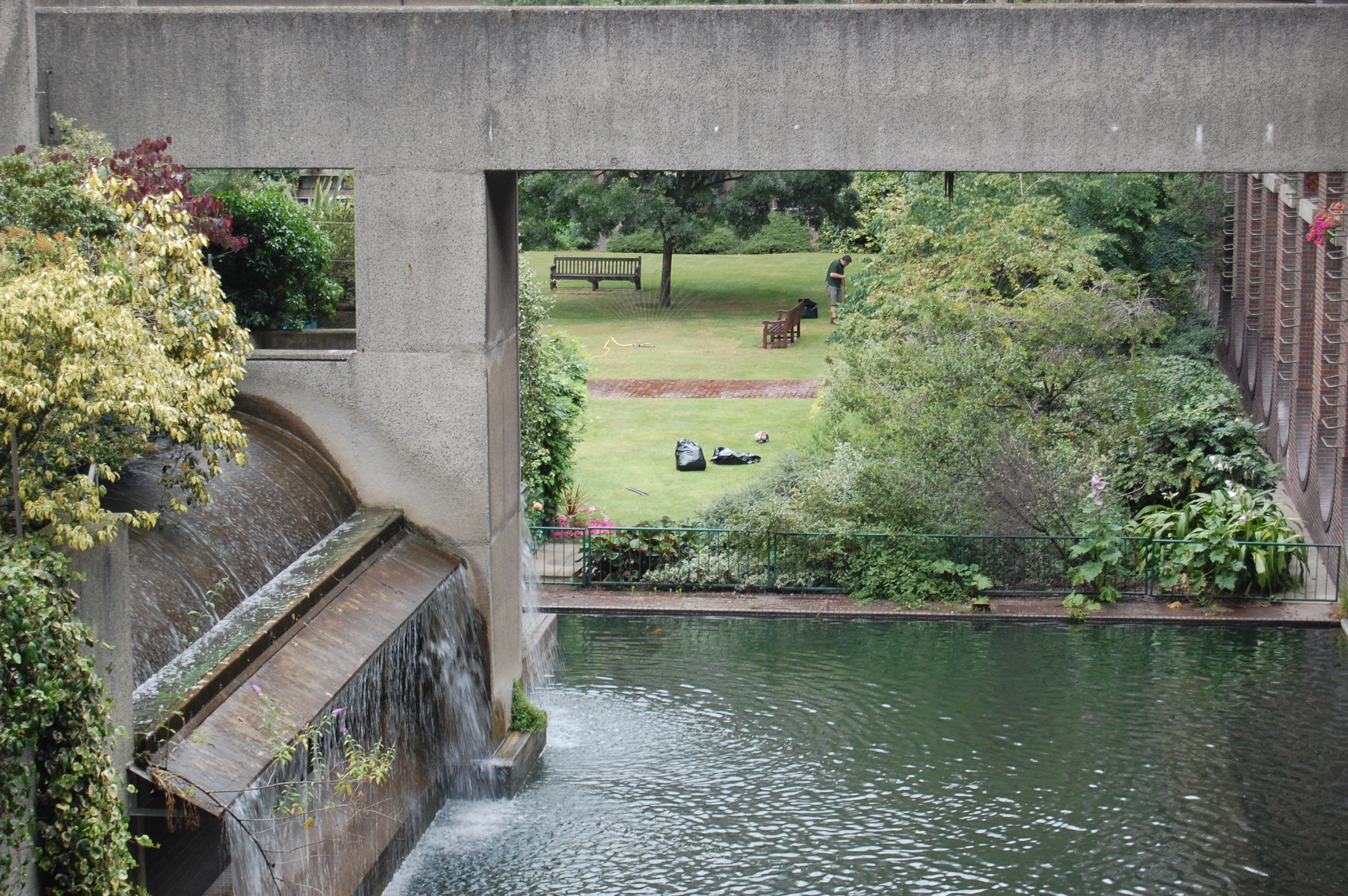
A waterfall in the Barbican Gardens.

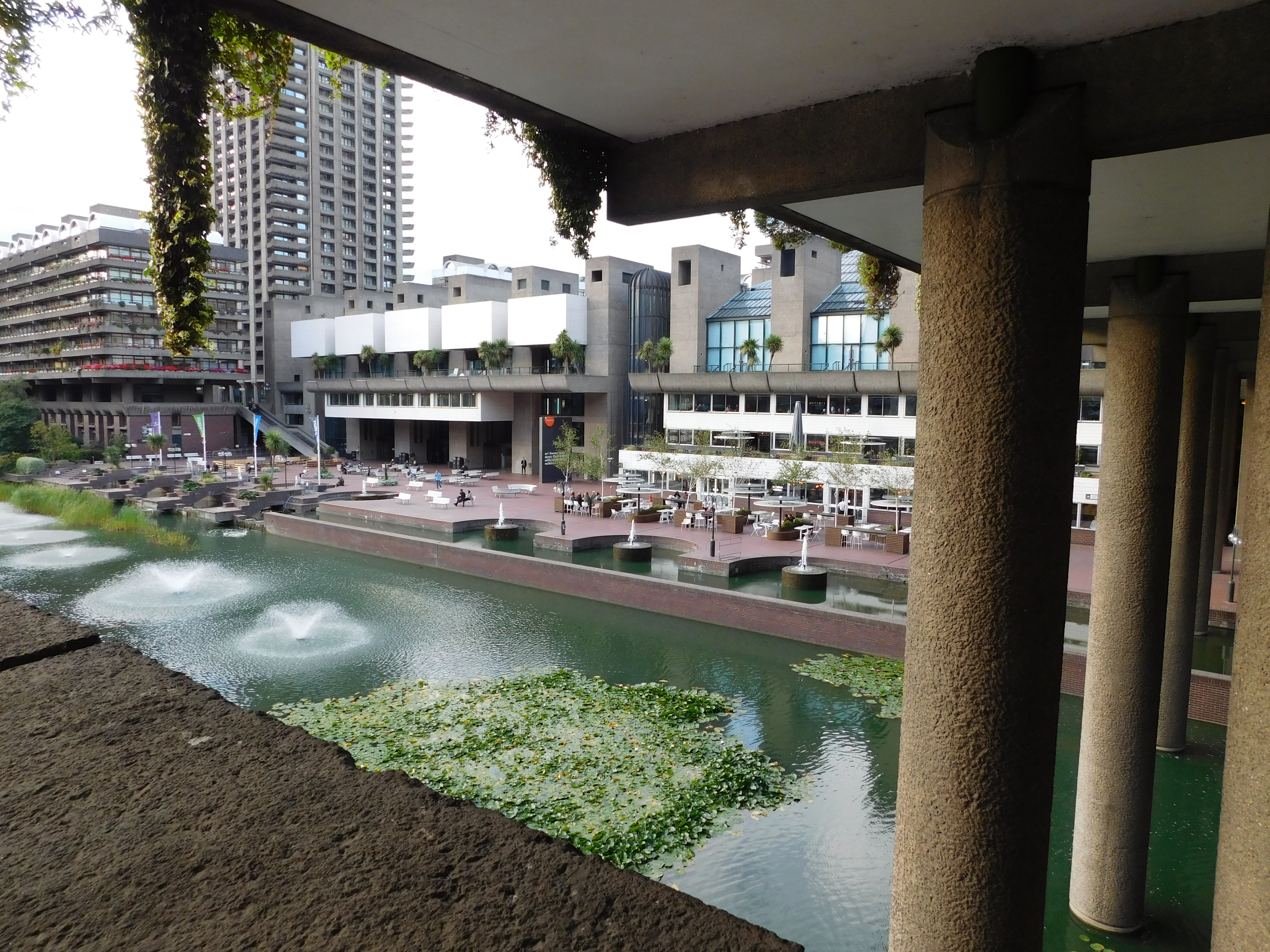
Concrete columns in the pond next to Lakeside Terrace

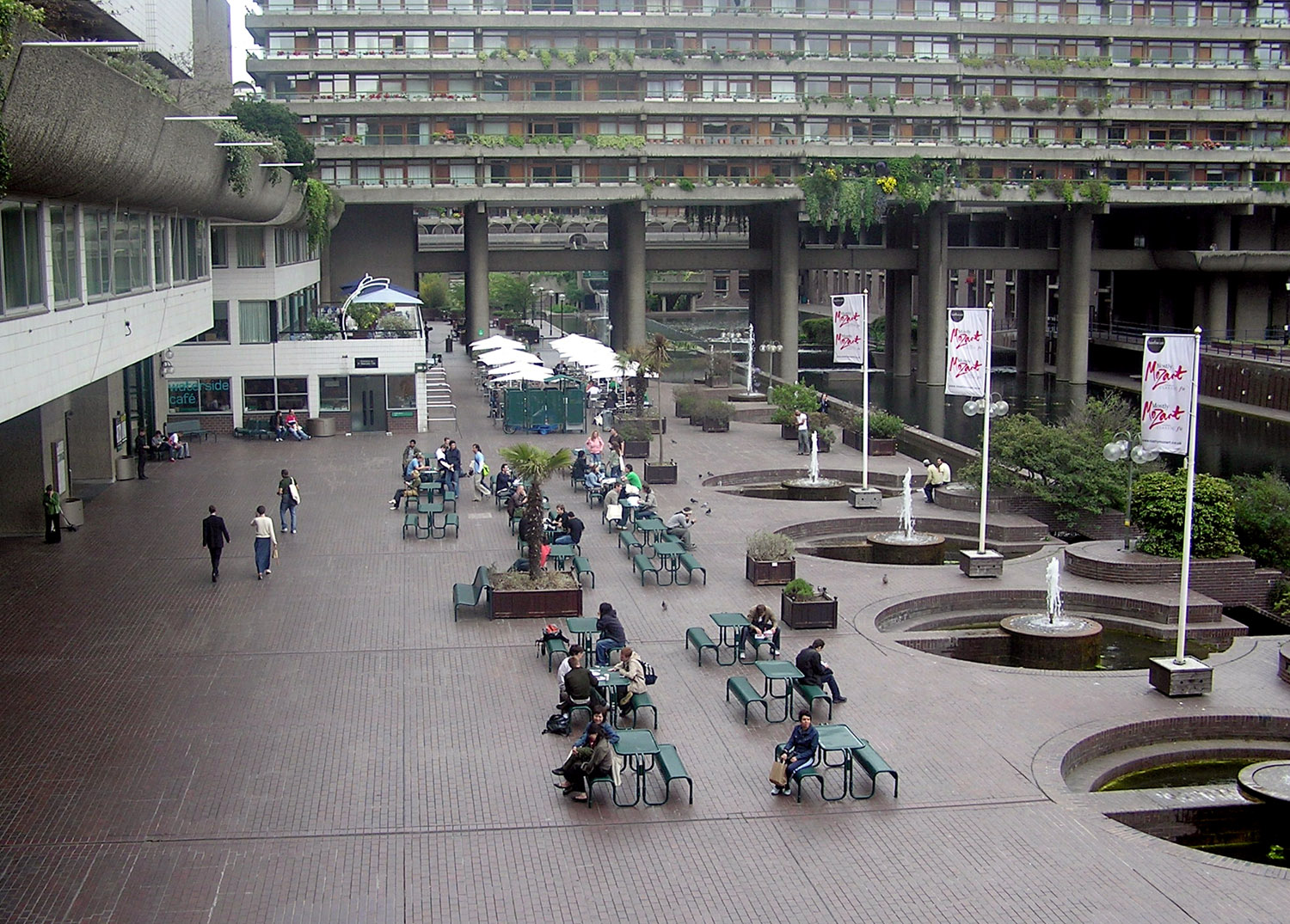
The central public court of the Barbican, Lakeside Terrace, features a café area.
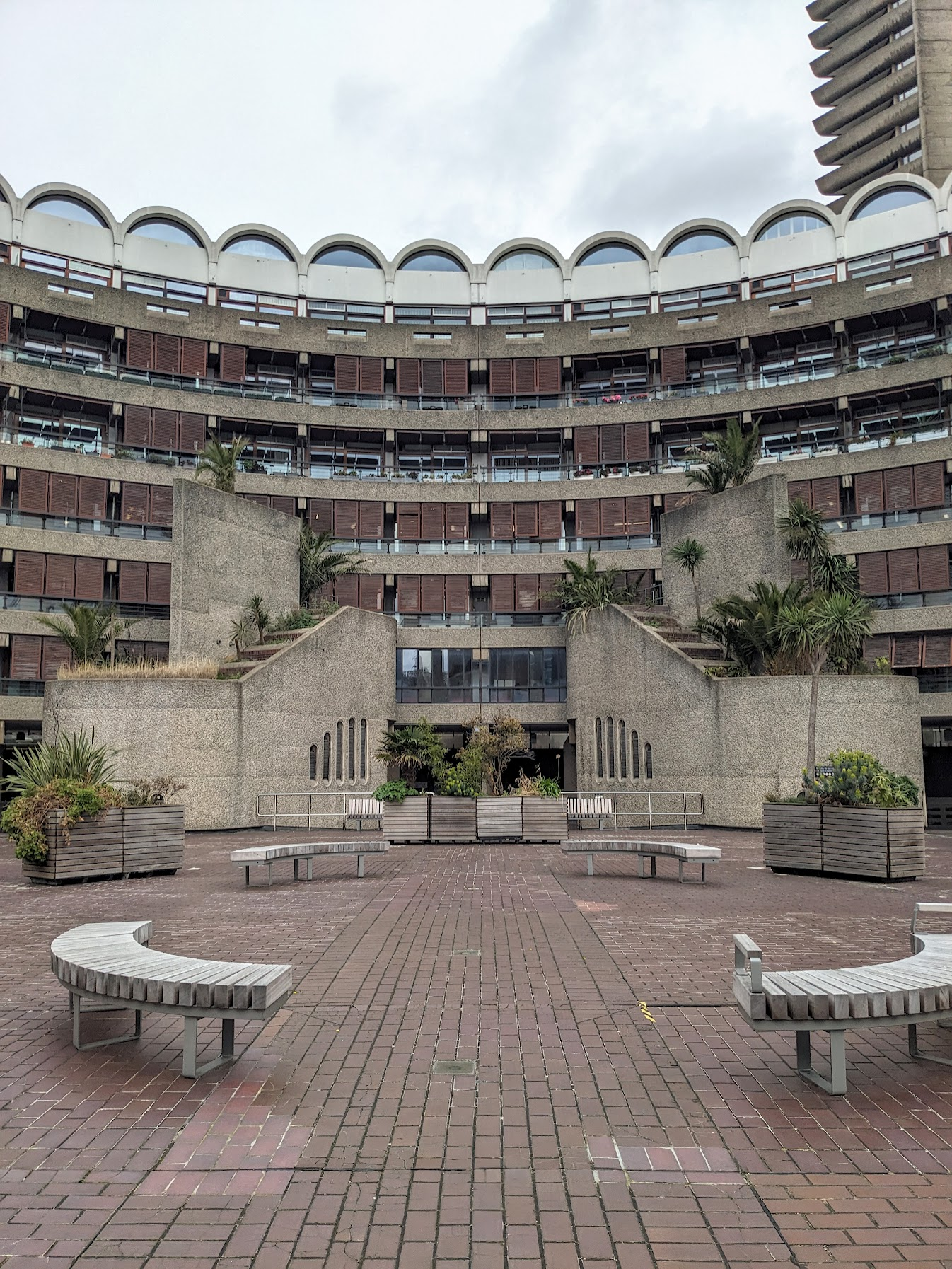
Courtyard above the Centre for the Arts and theatre. Inspiration was from ocean liners. Tropical ferns and palms were part of the original plan

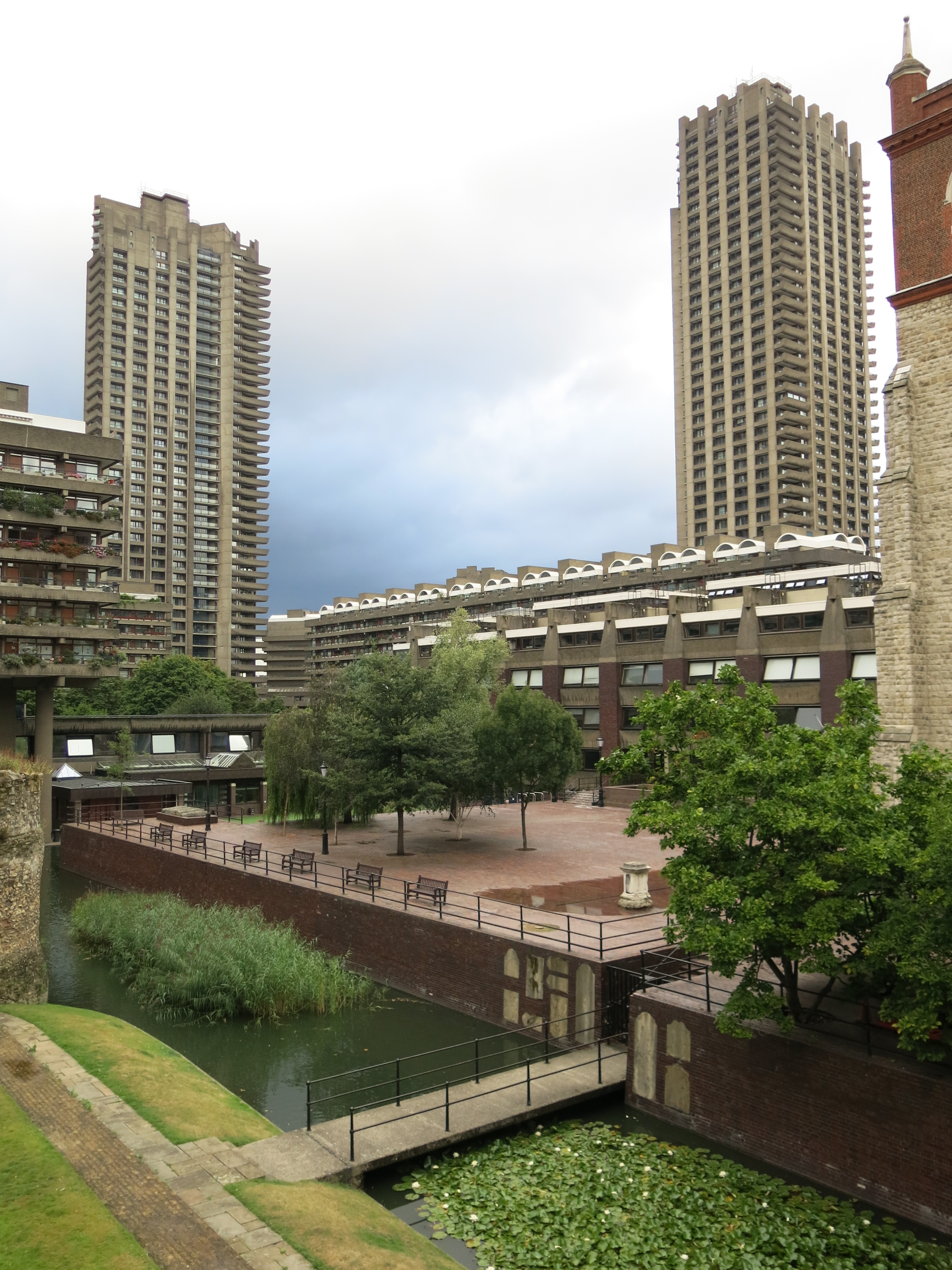
The Barbican Estate features underground parking, making space available for public squares.

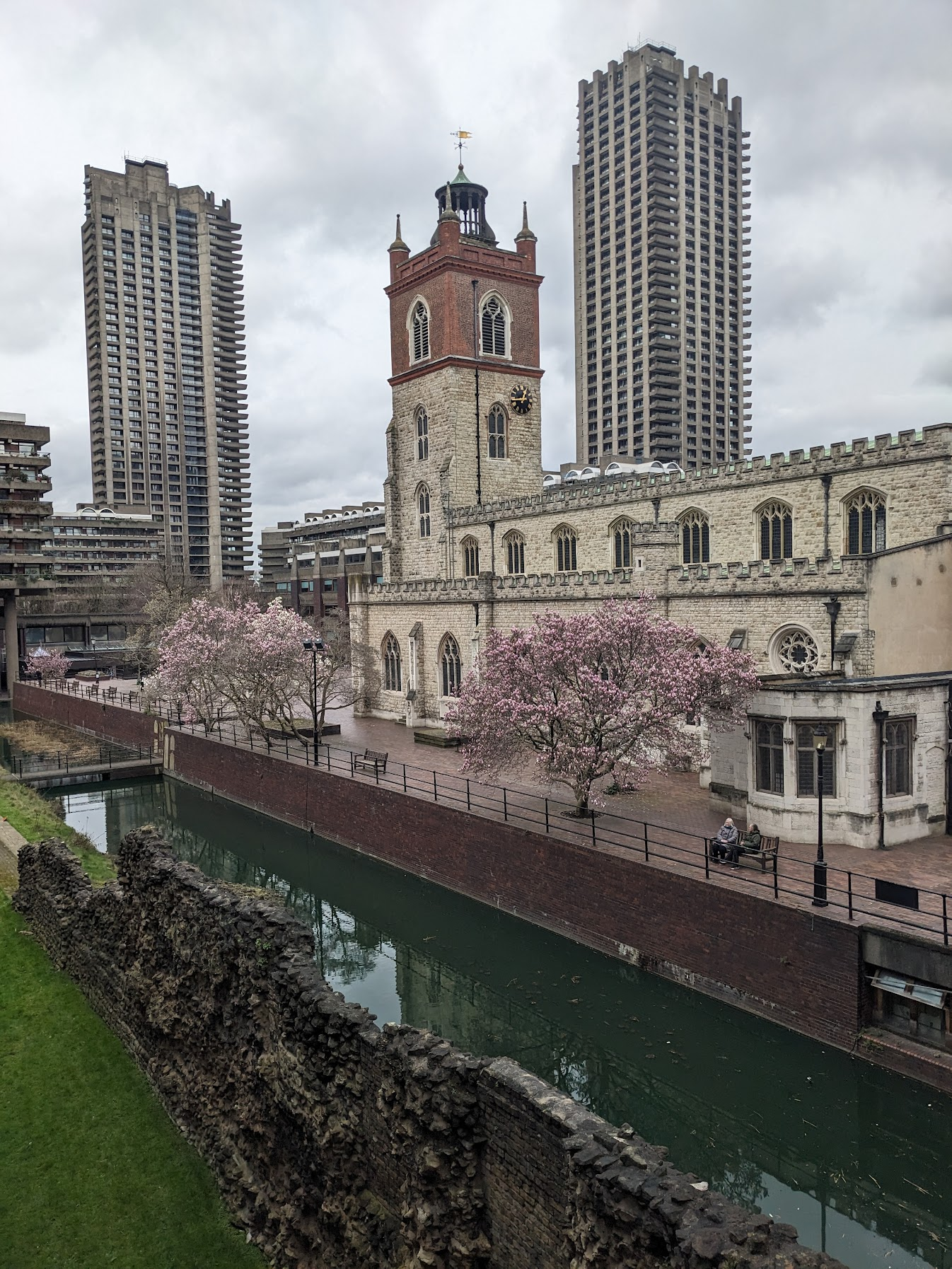
Water park and cafés surround the church and Roman Wall

== See also ==
- Bastion House
- Museum of London
- St Giles-without-Cripplegate
- Garchey
- List of Brutalist structures
