= Jack Walsh (English footballer) =

English footballer

Personal information
- Date of birth: 11 February 1901
- Place of birth: Blackburn, Lancashire, England
- Date of death: 12 June 1965
- Place of death: Bristol, England
- Position: Right back

Senior career*
Years	Team	Apps	(Gls)
- Darwen
- Blackburn Rovers
1925–1926	Aberdare Athletic	51	(3)
1926–1932	Bristol City	164	(1)
1932–1935	Millwall	140	(0)
- * Club domestic league appearances and goals

John J. Walsh (11 February 1901 – 12 June 1965) was an English footballer who played as a right back.

== Career ==
Walsh played locally with Darwen gaining Lancashire County honours before joining Blackburn Rovers. He moved to Aberdare Athletic in July 1925. Alex Raisbeck signed Jack Walsh in December 1926 for Bristol City.

== Honours ==
with Bristol City

- Football League Third Division South winner: 1926–27
