= Cullum Welch =

Sir Cullum Welch Bt OBE MC
- Born: 20 October 1895
- Died: 28 July 1980 (aged 84)
- Other name: Sir Cullum Welch
- Education: Alleyn's School
- Occupations: British Army officer, businessman, and member of the City of London Corporation
- Known for: Lord Mayor of London
- Spouses: Gertrude Evelyn Sladin Harrison (m. 1921), Irene Avril (m. 1969)
- Children: 2
- Parents: James Reader Welch (father); Harriet Cullum (mother)

Lieutenant-Colonel Sir George James Cullum Welch, 1st Baronet, (20 October 1895 – 28 July 1980), commonly known as Sir Cullum Welch, was a British Army officer, businessman, and member of the City of London Corporation, who served as Lord Mayor of London between 1956 and 1957.

Welch was the son of James Reader Welch and Harriet Cullum and was brought up in Chard, Somerset. He was educated at Alleyn's School. During the First World War he served as an officer in the Royal Berkshire Regiment, attaining the rank of Captain and being awarded the Military Cross. He again served with the regiment during the Second World War, gaining the rank of Lieutenant colonel. He was invested as an Officer of the Order of the British Empire in 1944.

In 1946 Welch was elected Chief Commoner of the Court of Common Council. He served as an Alderman of the City of London between 1947 and 1970, and was Sheriff of the City of London in the 1950. He was knighted in 1952. Welch was Honorary Colonel of the 8th (1st City of London) Battalion, Royal Fusiliers and of the City of London Army Cadet Force from 1956 to 1965. In 1956 he was elected Lord Mayor of London. On 16 December 1957 he was created a baronet, of Chard in the County of Somerset. Welch was a Commander of the Order of the Dannebrog and was invested as an Officer of the Order of Orange-Nassau in 1964.

He married Gertrude Evelyn Sladin Harrison, daughter of John William Harrison, on 23 April 1921, and together they had two children. He married his second wife, Irene Avril (died 2 March 1996), daughter of John Foster OBE, on 25 February 1969. Welch was succeeded in his title by his only son.

Coat of arms of Cullum Welch
Crest An heraldic antelope’s head erased Or armed Gules gorged with a collar composed of six pierced mullets Azure chained also Gules. Escutcheon Or on a fess Gules between six martlets Azure two lions passant respectant Or. Motto Ne Cede Arduis

Honorary titles
Preceded by Cuthbert Ackroyd	Lord Mayor of London; 1956–1957	Succeeded by Sir Denis Truscott
Baronetage of the United Kingdom
New creation	Baronet (of Chard); 1957–1980	Succeeded by John Welch
