= Welch (surname) =

Welch is a surname that comes from the Old English word welisċ, meaning ‘foreign’ (from walhaz). The first attested use of the cognomen was derived from the Old Norman French “le waleis”, meaning ‘the welshman’ and was first used as a nickname to a Cambro-Norman nobleman who witnessed a donation to the monastery of Monmouth in 1140. This nobleman was named William de la Haye and was the son of Nest ferch Rhys ap Tewdwr, he was called the ‘brother’ of Robert Fitz Stephen in a charter from “Unpublished Charters Pertaining to Ireland”.

It was used to describe those of Celtic or Welsh origin. Welch and another common surname, Walsh, share this derivation. Welsh is the most common form in Scotland, while in Ireland (where the name was carried by the Anglo-Norman invasion), the form of Walsh predominates.

== Notable people with the surname "Welch" ==
=== A ===
- Adam Cleghorn Welch (1864–1943), Scottish clergyman
- Adonijah Welch (1821–1889), American politician
- Ailsa A. Welch, English epidemiologist
- Alan Welch (1910–1980), Australian rules footballer
- Alexander Welch (1873–1962), Canadian politician
- Alexander McMillan Welch (1869–1943), American architect
- Alford Welch, American professor
- Amy Welch (born 1985), English journalist
- Andrew Welch (disambiguation), multiple people
- Ann Welch (1917–2002), English pilot
- Anthony Cleland Welch (born 1945), British military officer
- Archibald Welch (1794–1853), American politician and physician from Connecticut
- Aristides Welch (1811–1890), American racehorse breeder
- Art Welch (born 1944), Jamaican soccer player
- Ashbel Welch (1809–1882), American civil engineer
- Asher Welch (born 1944), Jamaican soccer player

=== B ===
- Benjamin Welch (1818–1863), American politician
- Bernard Lewis Welch (1911–1989), British statistician
- Bettina Welch (1922–1993), New Zealand actress
- Bill Welch (1941–2009), American politician
- Bo Welch (born 1951), American film director
- Bob Welch (disambiguation), multiple people
- Bradley Welch (born 1989), Trinidadian-American soccer player
- Brian Welch (born 1970), American musician
- Brian Welch (ski jumper) (born 1984), American ski jumper
- Bruce Welch (born 1941), English musician
- Buster Welch (1928–2022), American horse trainer

=== C ===
- Carolyn Welch (1929–2020), American figure skater
- Charles William Welch (1913–2002), Australian rules footballer
- Charles H. Welch (1880–1967), English theologian
- Chris Welch (born 1941), English music critic
- Christian Welch (born 1994), Australian rugby league footballer
- Christopher Evan Welch (1965–2013), American actor
- Chuck Welch (born 1948), American artist
- Claude Welch (disambiguation), multiple people
- Claxton Welch (born 1947), American football player
- Coley Welch (1919–2000), American boxer
- Colin Welch (1924–1997), English journalist
- Craig Welch (1948–2020), Canadian animator
- Cris Welch, American football coach
- Cullum Welch (1895–1980), British businessman
- Curt Welch (1862–1896), American baseball player

=== D ===
- Damien Welch (born 1982), Welsh rugby union footballer
- Daniel Welch (disambiguation), multiple people
- Danny Welch (disambiguation), multiple people
- Dave Welch (poker player), English poker player
- Dave Welch (admiral) (born 1961), American admiral
- David Welch (disambiguation), multiple people
- Denis Welch (1945–2014), British racing driver
- Denise Welch (born 1958), British actress
- Denton Welch (1915–1948), English writer
- Dick Welch (1913–2002), Australian rules footballer
- Dominick Welch (born 1998), American basketball player
- Don Welch (1932–2016), American poet
- Dwight S. Welch (1874–1962), American farmer and politician

=== E ===
- Ed Welch (born 1947), English composer
- Edward Welch (disambiguation), multiple people
- Edwin Welch (1838–1916), English photographer
- Elisabeth Welch (1904–2003), American singer and actress
- Elizabeth M. Welch (born 1970), American lawyer
- Elwyn Welch (1925–1961), New Zealand farmer and missionary
- Emanuel Chris Welch (born 1971), American politician
- Evans Welch, Trinidad and Tobago politician
- Evelyn Welch (born 1959), English-American scholar

=== F ===
- Florence Welch (born 1986), English singer
- Fran Welch (1895–1970), American football player and coach
- Frank Welch (disambiguation), multiple people

=== G ===
- Garry Welch (born 1955), New Zealand footballer
- Garth Welch (1936–2025), Australian dancer and choreographer
- George Welch (disambiguation), multiple people
- Georgiana Welch (1792–1879), English religious figure
- Gibby Welch (1904–1984), American football player
- Gillian Welch (born 1967), American musician
- Graeme Welch (born 1972), English cricketer
- Greg Welch (born 1964), Australian triathlete
- Gregory Welch, Canadian chemist
- Gus Welch (1892–1970), American football player and track athlete

=== H ===
- Haliey Welch (born 2002 or 2003), American internet personality
- Harold Welch (1912–1995), American businessman
- Harry Welch (disambiguation), multiple people
- Henry Kirke White Welch (1821–1870), American lawyer and politician
- Herbert Welch (disambiguation), multiple people
- H. Gilbert Welch (born 1955), American physician
- Howe Welch, American football player
- Huck Welch (1907–1979), Canadian football player

=== I ===
- Israel Victor Welch (1822–1869), American politician and lawyer
- Ivo Welch (born 1963), American economist

=== J ===
- Jack Welch (disambiguation), multiple people
- James Welch (disambiguation), multiple people
- Jane Welch (born 1964), English writer
- Jane Meade Welch (1854–1931), American journalist
- Janet Welch (1894–1959), English doctor
- Janet Martin Welch, American librarian
- Jason Welch (born 1989), American wrestler
- Jay E. Welch (1925–2008), American musician
- Jeffrey B. Welch (born 1954), American business executive
- Jenna Welch (1919–2019), American bookkeeper
- Jerry Welch (1944-2023), American politician from Missouri
- Jim Welch (1938–2017), American football player
- John Welch (disambiguation), multiple people
- Johnny Welch (1906–1940), American baseball player
- Jonathon Welch (born 1958), Australian conductor
- Joseph N. Welch (1890–1960), American lawyer
- Julie Welch (born 1948), British sports journalist
- Justin Welch (born 1972), British musician

=== K ===
- Keith Welch (born 1968), English footballer
- Kenneth Welch (1925–2006), American politician
- Kevin Welch (born 1955), American singer
- Kristian Welch (born 1998), American football player

=== L ===
- Larry D. Welch (born 1934), American Air Force general
- Lawrence Welch (born 1945), Australian theorist
- Lawrence E. Welch Jr., American judge
- Lenny Welch (1938–2025), American singer
- Leo Welch (1932–2017), American musician
- Leslie Welch (1907–1980), British radio personality
- Lew Welch (1926–1971), American poet
- Lewis Welch (1814–1878), American politician
- Lloyd R. Welch (1927–2023), American information theorist
- Longino Welch (1900–1969), American track and field athlete
- Lorne Welch (1916–1998), English engineer
- Louie Welch (1918–2008), American politician
- Lucas Welch (born 1974), American entrepreneur
- Lucia Foster Welch (1864–1940), English politician

=== M ===
- Mabel Welch
  - Mabel C. Welch (1890–1981), American architect
  - Mabel Rose Welch (1871–1959), American painter
- Malcolm Welch, English priest
- Marion Foster Welch (1851–1935), American house caretaker
- Martha G. Welch (born 1944), American physician
- Martin Welch (1864–1935), American schooner captain
- Mary Welch (1922–1958), American actress
- Mary Beaumont Welch (1841–1923), American educator and suffragist
- Mary-Scott Welch (1919–1995), American writer
- Matt Welch (born 1968), American blogger
- Matthew Welch (born 1976), American composer
- Michael Welch (disambiguation), multiple people
- Mickey Welch (1859–1941), American baseball player
- Micky Welch (born 1957), Barbadian-English footballer
- Milt Welch (1924–2019), American baseball player
- Monster Mike Welch (born 1979), American guitarist
- Myra Brooks Welch (1877–1959), American poet

=== N ===
- Neil Welch (1926–2017), American FBI agent
- Neville Welch (1906–1999), English priest
- Nick Welch (disambiguation), multiple people
- Niles Welch (1888–1976), American performer
- Noah Welch (born 1982), American ice hockey player
- Norval E. Welch (1835–1864), American colonel
- Nugent Welch (1881–1970), New Zealand artist

=== O ===
- Olivia Scott Welch (born 1998), American actress

=== P ===
- Patrick Welch (disambiguation), multiple people
- Peggy Welch (born 1955), American nurse and politician
- Peter Welch (born 1947), American politician
- Peter Welch (actor) (1922–1984), British actor
- Phil J. Welch (1895–1963), American politician
- Philip Welch (born 1954), British mathematician
- Priscilla Welch (born 1944), British runner

=== R ===
- Ralph Welch (1907–1974), American football player
- Raquel Welch (1940–2023), American actress
- Rebecca Welch, English football referee
- Reece Welch (born 2003), English footballer
- Richard Welch (disambiguation), multiple people
- Robert Welch (disambiguation), multiple people
- Rod Welch, American professor
- Roger Welch (born 1946), American artist
- Ron Welch (born 1960), American military officer
- Ronald Welch (1909–1982), British writer
- Ronnie Welch (born 1952), English footballer
- Roy Welch (1901–1977), American professional wrestler
- Rudolph B. Welch (1850–1906), American attorney and educator
- Rufus Welch (1800–1856), American impresario

=== S ===
- Samuel Earl Welch (1892–1969), American attorney
- Sandy Welch (born 1953), British television writer
- Saunders Welch (1711–1784), English businessman
- Savannah Welch (born 1984), American actress
- Scott Welch (born 1968), British boxer
- Sean Welch (born 1965), British musician
- Sharon D. Welch (born 1952), American academic
- Sian Welch (born 1954), American triathlete
- Stanton Welch (born 1969), Australian dancer
- Stephan Welch (born 1950), English priest
- Stephen Welch (born 1972), American wheelchair tennis player
- Stephen Welch (Medal of Honor) (1824–1906), American soldier
- Steven Welch, American musician
- Stuart Welch (born 1977), Australian rower
- Stuart Cary Welch (1928–2008), American scholar
- Suey Welch (1898/1899–1974), American boxing manager
- Susan Welch, American political scientist
- Suzy Welch (born 1959), American magazine editor

=== T ===
- Tahnee Welch (born 1961), American actress
- Tara Welch, American professor
- Taylor Welch (born 1989), American rugby league footballer
- Ted Welch (1892–1943), American baseball player
- Terry Welch (1939–1988), American computer scientist
- Thaddeus Welch (1844–1919), American painter
- Thomas Welch (disambiguation), multiple people
- Trevor Welch, Irish sports commentator
- Treyton Welch (born 2001), American football player
- Tub Welch (1866–1901), American baseball player

=== V ===
- Vernon S. Welch (1906–1980), American lawyer and politician
- Vince Welch (born 1964), American media personality
- Vivian Welch, Canadian epidemiologist

=== W ===
- Werburg Welch (1894–1990), English nun and artist
- Will Welch (born 1990), Australian rugby union footballer
- William Welch (disambiguation), multiple people
- Wilton Welch (1884–??), Australian actor and filmmaker
- Winfield Welch (1899–1980), American baseball player
- Winona Hazel Welch (1896–1990), American bryologist
- W. Wilbert Welch (1918–2015), American pastor

== Fictional characters ==
- Lou Welch, fictional character from Babylon 5

== See also ==
- Welch (disambiguation), a disambiguation page for Welch
- Walsh (disambiguation), a disambiguation page for Walsh
- Walsh (surname), people with the surname Walsh
- Walshe (surname), people with the surname Walshe
- Welsh (surname), people with the surname Welsh
- Wallace (surname), people with the surname Wallace
- General Welch (disambiguation), a page with Generals surnamed Welch
- Justice Welch (disambiguation), a page with Justices surnamed Welch
- Senator Welch (disambiguation), a page with Senators surnamed Welch
