= Welsh (surname) =

Origin
- Origin: Old English
- Meaning: Foreigner, Stranger, Romano-Briton (Celt).
- Region of origin: British Isles

Other names
- Variant forms: Walsh, Walshe, Welch; German cognates: Welsch, Walsch, Walch

Welsh is a surname from the Old English language given to the Celtic Britons. The surname can also be the result of anglicization of the German cognate Welsch. (Note: See also: *Walhaz) Welsh is a popular surname in Scotland.

== Etymology ==
It appears that the etymology of the name Welsh is derived from the Old English adjective ƿilisċ or ƿielisċ, an adjective derived from the noun ƿielisċ, a term for a Roman or Roman subject. These terms were used by many ancient Germanic peoples to describe inhabitants of the former Roman Empire over the Alps, Rhine, and North Sea, who spoke Latin or Celtic languages. The Old High German walh became walch in Middle High German and the adjectival walhisk became MHG welsch. In present-day German, Welsche refers to Romance peoples, the Italians in particular, but also the French and the Romanic neighbours of the German-speaking lands in general.

The Old English variant wilisc of the Proto-Germanic root was applied to the native British peoples encountered by the Saxon invaders and settlers during the 5th and 6th centuries AD. Over the succeeding centuries the term wilisc morphed through Middle English into Welsh, becoming an epithet at once more specifically for the Welsh people, as England became increasingly populated with Anglo-Saxons.

== Notable people ==
- Alex Welsh (cyclist) (born 1991), Australian para-cyclist
- Brian Welsh (born 1981), Scottish film and television director
- Chris Welsh (born 1955), former baseball pitcher and current announcer for the Cincinnati Reds
- Christie Welsh (born 1991), American soccer player
- David Welsh (1793–1845), Scottish religious leader
- Emilio Villalba Welsh (1906–1992), Argentine screenwriter
- Freddie Welsh (1886–1927), Welsh World Lightweight boxing champion
- George Welsh (disambiguation), several people
- Irvine Welsh (born 1958), Scottish author
- Jerry Welsh (basketball) (1936–2025), American college basketball coach
- Jerry Welsh (ice hockey) (born 1950), Canadian ice hockey player and college ice hockey coach
- John Welsh (English footballer) (born 1984), player for Hull City, England
- Kenneth Welsh (1942–2022), Canadian film and television actor
- Mark Welsh (born 1954), 20th Chief of Staff of the United States Air Force
- Matt Welsh (born 1976), Australian swimmer
- Matthew E. Welsh (1912–1995), American politician and governor of Indiana
- Michael Welsh (disambiguation), several people
- Patrick Welsh (disambiguation), several people
- Peter Welsh (disambiguation), several people
- Paul Welsh (disambiguation), several people
- Sean Welsh (born 1990), Scottish footballer
- Thomas Welsh (disambiguation), several people
- William Welsh (disambiguation), several people

== Fictional characters ==
- Barry Welsh, comedy character played by John Sparkes

== See also ==
- Walsh (surname)
- Welch (surname)
- Walshe (surname)
- Walch
- Walsch
- *Walhaz
