= Senator Welch =

Senator Welch may also refer to:

== Members of the United States Senate ==
- Adonijah Welch (1821–1889), U.S. Senator from Florida
- Peter Welch (born 1947), U.S. Senator from Vermont

== United States state senate members ==
- David E. Welch (1835–after 1900), Wisconsin State Senate
- Henry Kirke White Welch (1821–1870), Connecticut State Senate
- James T. Welch (born 1975), Massachusetts State Senate
- John Welch (politician) (1805–1891), Ohio State Senate
- Lewis Welch (1814–1878), Michigan State Senate
- Patrick Welch (1948–2020), Illinois State Senate
- Richard J. Welch (1869–1949), California State Senate
- Robert Welch (Wisconsin politician) (born 1958), Wisconsin State Senate
- William W. Welch (1818–1892), Connecticut State Senate
