= Welch =

Welch, Welch's, Welchs or Welches may refer to:

== People ==
- Welch (surname)

== Places ==
- Welch, Oklahoma, a town, US
- Welches, Oregon, an unincorporated community, US
- Welch, Texas, an unincorporated community, US
- Welchs, Virginia, an unincorporated community, US
- Welch, West Virginia, a city, US
- Welch Township, Goodhue County, Minnesota, US
- Welch Township, Cape Girardeau County, Missouri, US
- Welch Mountains, Palmer Land, Antarctica
- Welch Peak, British Columbia, Canada
- Welch Peaks, Washington, US
- Welch Island, an island off of Mac. Robertson Land, Antarctica
- Welch Rocks, north of Welch Island, Antarctica
- 2405 Welch, an asteroid

== In the military ==
- Welch Regiment or The Welch, a former British Army regiment
- Welch's Regiment of Militia, a unit in the Continental Army during the American Revolutionary War
- USS Welch, the name of a patrol craft and a gunboat

== Other uses ==
- Welch's, US brand of fruit-based products
- An archaic spelling of Welsh
- Welch baronets, a title in the Baronetage of the United Kingdom
- Welch College, Gallatin, Tennessee, a private four-year college
- Welch Training School, New Haven, Connecticut, on the National Register of Historic Places
- Welch Hall (disambiguation), various buildings
- Francis G. Welch Stadium, a sports stadium in Emporia, Kansas
- Welch Motor Car Company

== See also ==
- Welch method, a method of estimating the power of a signal vs. frequency
- Welch's t test, a statistical test
- Charlottesville, Iowa, a small town and post office founded by Albert Welch
- Welsh (disambiguation)
