= Thomas Walsh =

Thomas, Tom, or Tommy Walsh may refer to:

== Sportspeople ==
=== Association football (soccer) ===
- Tot Walsh (Thomas Walsh, 1900–1950), English association footballer for Bolton, Bristol City and Crystal Palace
- Tom Walsh (footballer) (born 1996), Scottish association footballer

=== Gaelic football ===
- Tommy Walsh (Kerry footballer) (born 1988), Kerry Gaelic footballer and Australian rules footballer
- Tommy Walsh (Wicklow Gaelic footballer), Wicklow Gaelic footballer

=== Hurling ===
- Tom Walsh (Dunnamaggin hurler) (1931–2013), Kilkenny hurler
- Tom Walsh (Thomastown hurler) (born 1944), former Kilkenny hurler
- Tommy Walsh (hurler, born 1983), Irish hurler for Kilkenny and Tullaroan
- Tommy Walsh (hurler, born 1998), Irish hurler for Kilkenny and Tullaroan

=== Rugby ===
- Tom Walsh (rugby league, fl.1896–1910), rugby league footballer of the 1900s and 1910s for Hunslet
- Tom Walsh (rugby league, Castleford), rugby league footballer of the 1930s, 1940s and 1950s for Castleford

=== Others ===
- Tom Walsh (American football) (born 1949), former Oakland/Los Angeles Raiders offensive coordinator and college head coach
- Thomas Walsh (skier) (born 1995), American para-alpine skier
- Tom Walsh (baseball) (1886–1963), American baseball player
- Tom Walsh (shot putter) (born 1992), New Zealand shot putter
- Tom Walsh (squash player) (born 1999), English professional squash player

== Politicians ==
- Thomas Walsh (Irish politician) (1901–1956), Fianna Fáil politician and minister for agriculture
- Thomas Walsh (Massachusetts politician) (born 1960), Massachusetts politician
- Thomas Walsh (New Hampshire politician), member the New Hampshire House of Representatives
- Thomas Walsh (MP for Leicestershire), English politician
- Thomas J. Walsh (1859–1933), American lawyer and US senator from Montana
- Thomas J. Walsh (Alberta politician) (1875–1945), Canadian politician
- Thomas J. Walsh (New York politician) (c. 1892–1955), New York state senator and Staten Island judge
- Thomas P. Walsh (born 1939), Pennsylvania politician
- Thomas Yates Walsh (1809–1865), U.S. representative from Maryland
- Tom Walsh (Illinois politician), member of the Illinois House of Representatives

== Religious figures ==
- Thomas Walsh (archbishop of Cashel) (died 1654), Irish Roman Catholic prelate
- Thomas Walsh (archbishop of Newark) (1873–1952), American Roman Catholic prelate
- Thomas Walsh (vicar apostolic) (1776–1849), English Roman Catholic bishop and vicar apostolic
- Thomas E. Walsh (1853–1893), Irish-Canadian Catholic priest and president of the University of Notre Dame

== Others ==
- Thomas Walsh (Colorado architect), architect in Denver, Colorado
- Thomas Walsh (miner) (1850–1910, Thomas Francis Walsh), Irish-American miner and multi-millionaire, of Colorado
- Thomas Walsh (mobster) (died 1929), New York mobster involved in narcotics
- Thomas Walsh (poet) (1875–1928), American poet and literary figure
- Thomas Walsh (trade unionist) (1891–1964), British trade unionist
- Thomas J. Walsh (Alberta lawyer) (1927–2016), lawyer from Calgary, Alberta
- Thomas Joseph Walsh (Wexford) (1911–1989), founder of the Wexford Opera Festival
- Thomas Stephen Walsh (1925–2003), Garda Inspector
- Thomas Waryng Walsh (1826–1890), St. Louis architect
- Thomas Walsh, frontman with Irish band Pugwash
- Thomas Walsh, Dublin accordion player and composer
- Tom Walsh (trade unionist) (1871–1943), Irish-born Australian trade unionist
- Tommy Walsh (builder) (1956–2026), English celebrity builder

== See also ==
- Thomas Welch (disambiguation)
- Thomas Welsh (disambiguation)
