= James Welsh =

James Welsh may refer to:

- James C. Welsh (1880–1954), Scottish Labour Party politician, Member of Parliament (MP) for Coatbridge 1922–1931, and Bothwell 1935–1945.
- James Welsh (East India Company officer) (1775–1861), army officer in the East India Company
- James Welsh (Paisley MP) (1881–1969), Scottish Labour Party politician, MP for Paisley 1929–1931
- James Welsh (Medal of Honor) (1846–1916), American Civil War Medal of Honor recipient
- James Welsh (rower) (1931–1963), American Olympic rower
- Jimmy Welsh (1902–1970), American baseball player
- Jim Welsh, James Edward (1902–1958), American football player

== See also ==
- James Welch (disambiguation)
