= David Welch =

David Welch may refer to:

- David A. Welch (born 1960), Canadian political scientist
- David Welch (horticulturist) (1933–2000), British horticulturist
- David Welch (diplomat) (born 1953), American diplomat
- David Welch (baseball) (born 1983), baseball pitcher
- David Welch (optical engineer) (born 1960), American businessman and research scientist
- David Welch (historian), English historian
- David E. Welch (1835–?), Wisconsin state assemblyman and senator
- David Welch (New Hampshire politician) (born 1940), member of the New Hampshire House of Representatives
- Dave Welch (poker player), British poker player
- Dave Welch (admiral), United States Navy admiral

== See also ==
- David Welsh
- Welch (surname)
