= Mabel Welch =

Mabel Welch may refer to:

- Mabel C. Welch (1890–1981), American architect
- Mabel Rose Welch (1871–1959), American painter
