= Weltsch =

Weltsch is a surname. Notable people with the surname include:

- Felix Weltsch (1884–1964), German-speaking Czech Jewish librarian, philosopher, and author
- Robert Weltsch (1891–1982), Czech-Israeli journalist, editor, and prominent Zionist
- Samuel Weltsch (1835–1901), Bohemian cantor

== See also ==
- Welsch
