= Capen-Clark Historic District =

Historic district in Connecticut, United States

- U.S. National Register of Historic Places
- U.S. Historic district
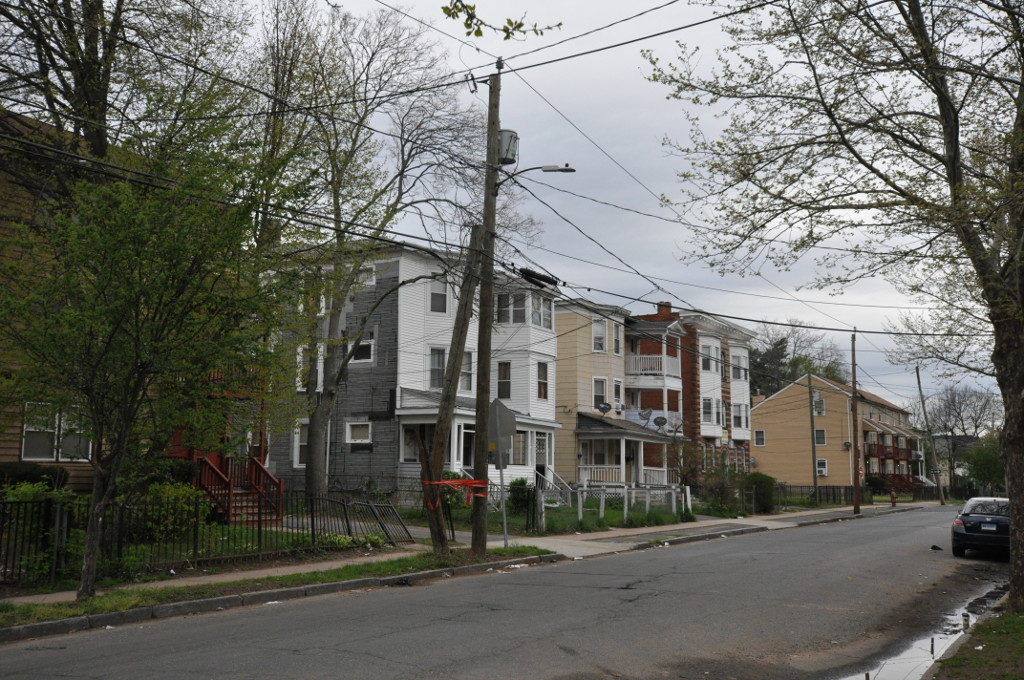

- Location within Connecticut Location within the United States
- Location: Capen, Clark, Elmer, Barbour, Martin, and Main Streets, Hartford, Connecticut
- Coordinates: 41°47′11″N 72°40′42″W
- Area: 32 acres (13 ha)
- Built: 1850
- Architectural style: Gothic, Italianate, Queen Anne
- NRHP reference No.: 82004402
- Added to NRHP: April 27, 1982

The Capen-Clark Historic District encompasses a residential neighborhood area in the North End of Hartford, Connecticut. Centered on Capen Street between Main and Enfield Streets, it contains a cross-section of post-Civil War Victorian vernacular housing styles, and shows in its development patterns the ebb and flow of the city's economy between about 1865 and 1910. The district was listed on the National Register of Historic Places in 1982.

== Description and history ==
Prior to the Civil War, the Capen Street area in northern Hartford was mostly open land, and Spring Grove Cemetery, founded in 1845, formed a natural barrier it and older development in the city's Clay-Arsenal area. The city experienced economic growth in the years immediately after the Civil War, which pushed residential development into this area. Between 1867 and 1873 Capen Street and three roads leading north from it were laid out, and a series of vernacular Italianate houses and Second Empire were built. The economy slumped in the late 1870s, and did not pick up again until the late 1880s. At that time a period of infill development began in this neighborhood, spurred by expansion of the city's streetcar network, resulting in the addition of Queen Anne Victorians. In 1898 two of the city's oldest examples of apartment blocks were built at 44 and 46 Capen Street.

The historic district's main focus is Capen Street, which runs east-west between Main and Enfield Streets, and is bordered on the south by Spring Grove Cemetery. It extends northward along four roads: Clark, Barbour, Martin, and Garden Streets, and includes properties on Main and Elmer Streets. Buildings range in height from 1-1/2 to three stories, and are generally of wood frame or brick construction. Many are single family residences, but there are two-family houses and triple deckers, and a few apartment blocks. Non-residential buildings include a former school complex, now a community center, and a church.

== See also ==
- National Register of Historic Places listings in Hartford, Connecticut
