= Malcolm Grant (East India Company officer) =

British military officer

Lieutenant General Malcolm Grant
- Born: 1762
- Died: 28 September 1831 (aged 68–69); Westminster, London, England
- Military career
- Allegiance: East India Company
- Branch: Bombay Army
- Service years: 1777–1807
- Rank: Lieutenant general
- Unit: Bombay Native Infantry
- Conflicts: First Anglo-Maratha War; Fourth Anglo-Mysore War; Malabar Rebellions

Lieutenant General Malcolm Grant (1762 – 28 September 1831) was an English military officer of the East India Company's Bombay Army.

== Career ==
Grant was appointed to an infantry cadetship on the Bombay Army establishment in 1776. He left England in January 1777, and was made ensign on 20 November of that year. In 1779 he served with a corps employed against the Mahrattas during the First Anglo-Maratha War in support of Ragonauth Rao. He became lieutenant in 1780, and in 1780–81 served at the siege of Bassein and elsewhere with the Bengal Army force under General Thomas Goddard, and was then employed in the neighbouring districts.

Subsequently, Grant served in Malabar under General Norman MacLeod until 1788, when he went home on furlough. He became captain 19 January 1789, and major 8 January 1796. He returned to India in 1790, and was employed from 1792 to 1798 in Malabar. When operations were begun by the Company against Tippoo Sultan he commanded the Bombay native grenadier battalion in the force sent under Colonel Little to act against the Mahrattas. This force was obliged to retire, and Grant's corps embarked at Jeyghar and proceeded by sea to Cannonore; and then went by the Pondicherry ghats, reaching Sidapoor on the Cauvery before the fall of Seringapatam.

After the capture of Mysore, Grant, in command of the 1st Battalion, 3rd Bombay Native Infantry, was employed with the troops under General James Stuart at Mangalore and in Canara, and at the reduction of the fortress of Jemaulghur near Mangalore. On 6 March 1800, he became lieutenant-colonel in the 8th Bombay Native Infantry, with which he served several years in Malabar, engaged suppressing resistance to British rule, and in 1804 he succeeded Colonel Montresor in the chief command in Malabar and Canara.

Madras Army troops having relieved the Bombay force in these districts in December of the same year, Grant was on his way to Bombay when he received reinforcements of artillery and stores from the presidency, with orders to land in the Concan with the force under his command, about three thousand men, and effect the reduction of the fortress of Savendroog, then held by Huri Belal. This task Grant accomplished to the satisfaction of the Indian government and the peishwa.

== Later life ==
In 1807 Grant returned to England in very bad health. He was appointed lieutenant-colonel commandant in 1809, and in 1810 colonel of the 9th Bombay Native Infantry; he became a major-general in 1813, and lieutenant-general in 1825. He died at his residence in Upper Wimpole Street, London, 28 September 1831, aged 69.
