= General Welsh =

General Welsh may refer to:

- James Welsh (East India Company officer) (1775–1861), Madras Army general
- Mark Welsh (born 1953), U.S. Air Force four-star general
- Thomas Welsh (general) (1824–1863), Union Army brigadier general

== See also ==
- General Welch (disambiguation)
