= Manhattan Heights =

Manhattan Heights may refer to:

- Manhattan Heights (skyscraper)
- Manhattan Heights (El Paso, Texas neighborhood)
- Manhattan Beach, California
