= Otto H. Thorman =

American architect

- Born: April 12, 1887; Washington, Missouri, U.S.
- Died: March 11, 1966 (aged 78); El Paso, Texas, U.S.
- Occupation: Architect
- Spouse: Adelia F. Thorman
- Children: 2 sons, 3 daughters

Otto H. Thorman (April 12, 1887 - March 11, 1966) was an American architect. He designed many houses in the Manhattan Heights neighborhood of El Paso, Texas, as well as several buildings listed on the National Register of Historic Places like the Woman's Club of El Paso and Goddard Hall on the campus of New Mexico State University in Las Cruces, New Mexico.

== Early life ==
Thorman was born on April 12, 1887, in Washington, Missouri. He attended the St. Louis Art Institute.

== Career ==
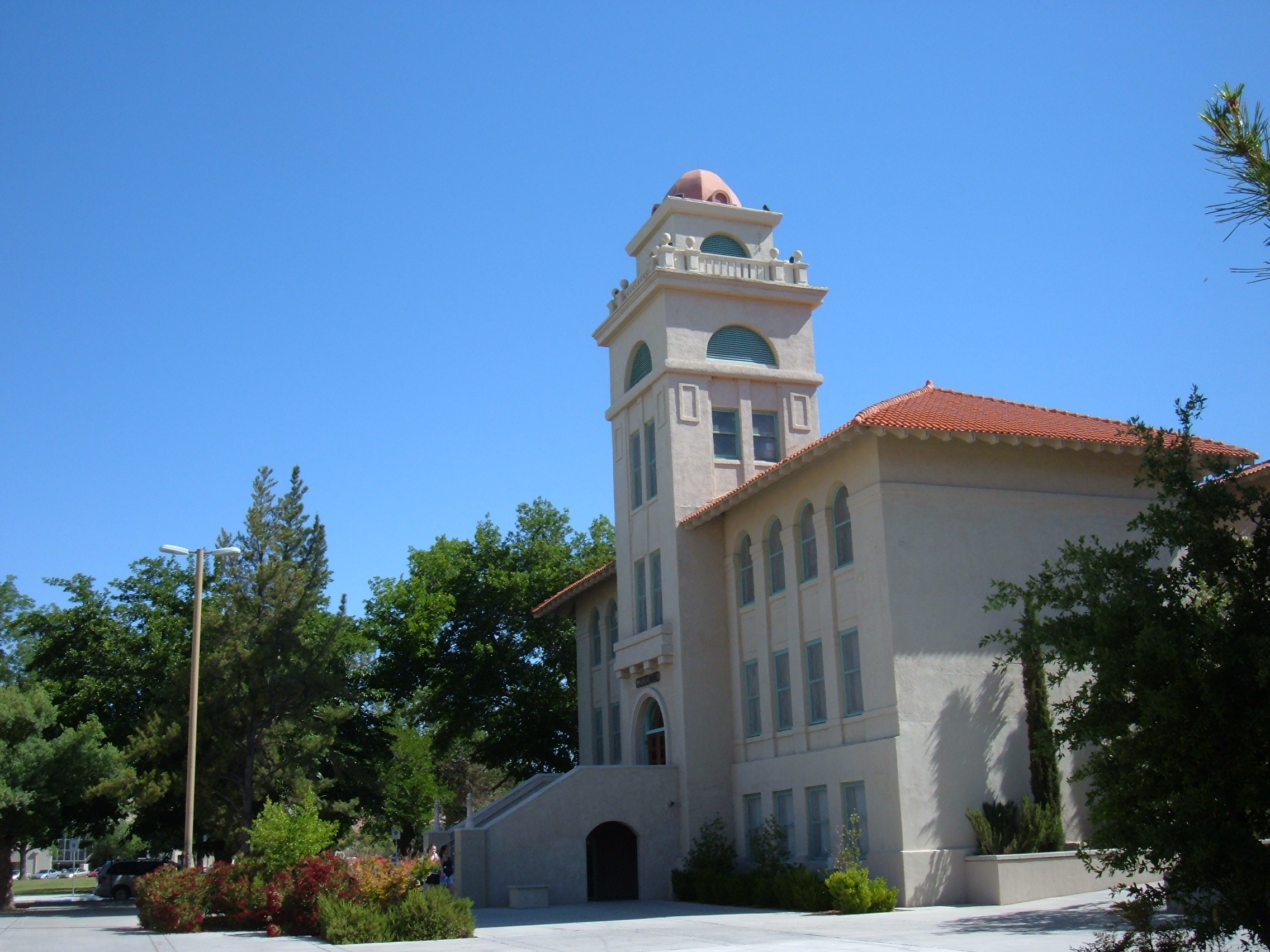
Goddard Hall, designed by Thorman in 1913.

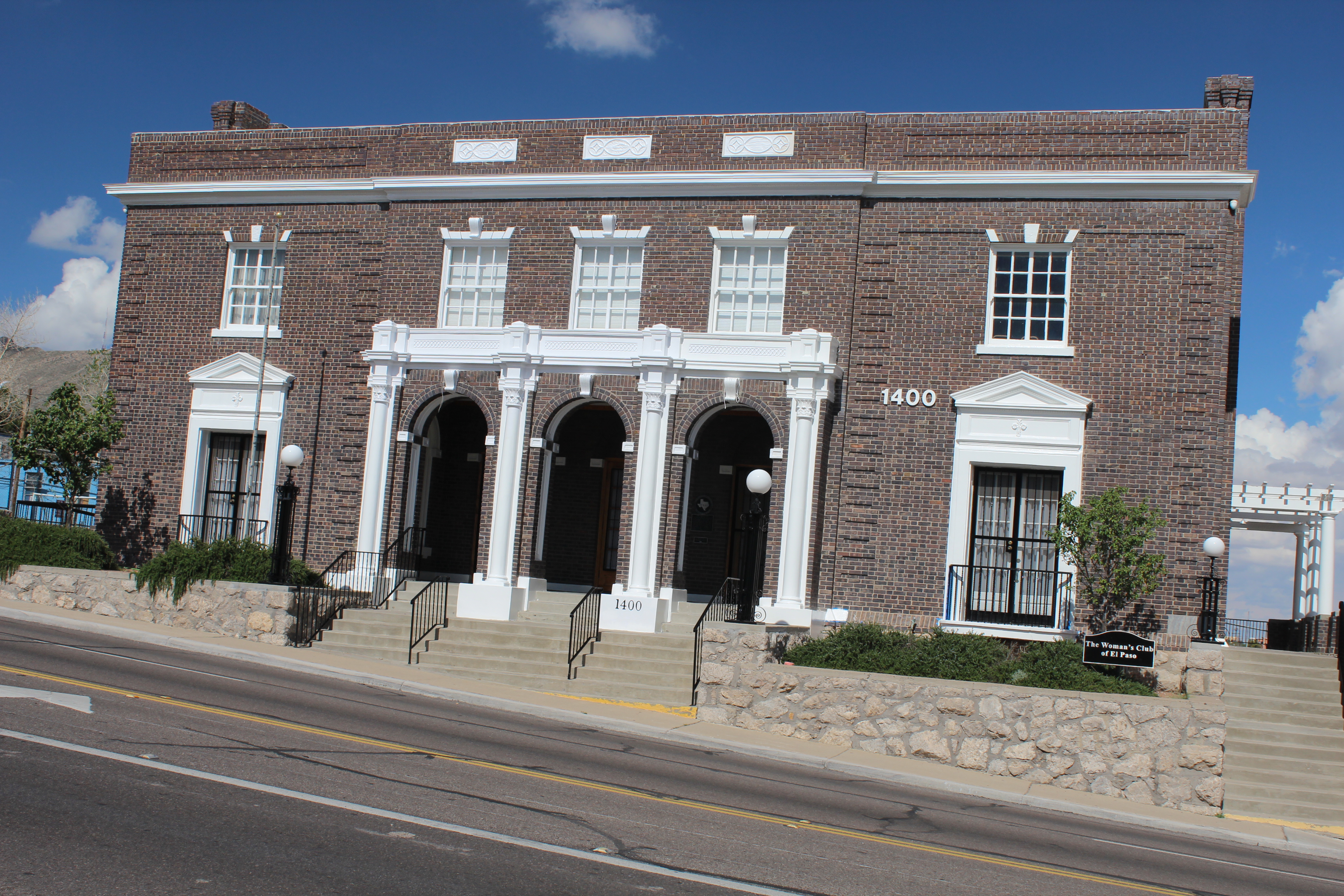
The El Paso Women's Club, designed by Thorman in 1916.

Thorman began his career as an architect in Albuquerque, New Mexico, where he focused on the Spanish Colonial Revival style.

From 1911 to his death, Thorman maintained an architectural practice in El Paso, Texas. He designed many houses in the Manhattan Heights neighborhood. He also designed the El Paso Free Public Library and the pavilion for the former Statue of Liberty in Pioneer Plaza. In 1916, he designed the Woman's Club of El Paso in the Georgian Revival and Beaux-Arts styles. It is listed on the National Register of Historic Places.

In Las Cruces, New Mexico, Thorman designed Goddard Hall in the Spanish Colonial Revival style in 1913 and the (former) University President's House in the Prairie School style in 1918; they are both located on the campus of New Mexico State University. With Guy L. Frazer, he designed the Rio Grande Theatre in the Renaissance Revival style in 1926. All three buildings are listed on the National Register of Historic Places.

Thorman succeeded Louis Daeuble Jr. as the president of the El Paso chapter of the American Institute of Architects in 1952.

== Personal life and death ==
With his wife Adelia, Thorman had two sons and three daughters. He died on March 11, 1966, in El Paso.
