= Pat Welsh =

Pat Welsh may refer to:

- Pat Welsh (actress) (1915–1995), Patricia Welsh, American film actress
- Pat Welsh (sports journalist) (born 1957), head of sports for Seven News in Brisbane
- Pat Welsh (author) (born 1929), Patricia Welsh, television performer, columnist, garden editor, public speaker, and author

== See also ==
- Patrick Welsh (disambiguation)
