= Welsh =

Welsh may refer to:

== Related to Wales ==
- Culture of Wales
- Welsh, of or about Wales
- Welsh language, spoken in Wales
- Welsh people, an ethnic group native to Wales

== Places ==
- Welsh, Louisiana, U.S.
- Welsh, Ohio, U.S.
- Welsh Basin, during the Cambrian, Ordovician and Silurian geological periods

== Other uses ==
- Welsh (surname), including a list of people with the name
- Welsh pig, a breed of domestic pig

== See also ==
- Welch (disambiguation)
- Welsch, a surname
