= Edward Welsh =

Edward Welsh may refer to:

- Edward Welsh (soldier) (1843–1929), Union Army soldier and Medal of Honor recipient
- Edward C. Welsh (1909–1990), American government official

== See also ==
- Edward Welch (disambiguation)
