= Walsh =

Walsh may refer to:

== People and fictional characters ==
- Walsh (surname), including a list of people and fictional characters

== Places ==
=== Australia ===
- Mount Walsh, Mount Walsh National Park

=== Canada ===
- Fort Walsh, one of the first Royal Canadian Mounted Police posts, site of the Cypress Hills Massacre
- Walsh, Alberta, a hamlet
- Walsh, Ontario, a hamlet
- Walsh Lake, Quebec

=== United States ===
- Walsh, Colorado, a Statutory Town
- Walsh, Michigan, a former settlement
- Walsh, Wisconsin, an unincorporated community
- Walsh County, North Dakota

=== United Kingdom ===
- Shelsley Walsh, village and civil parish in Worcestershire

== Schools ==
- Walsh School of Foreign Service, Georgetown University, Washington, D.C.
- Walsh University, North Canton, Ohio, a private Catholic university
- Walsh College, Troy, Michigan
- Walsh Jesuit High School, Cuyahoga Falls, Ohio

== Other uses ==
- USS Quentin Walsh, a planned United States Navy guided missile destroyer
- USS Walsh (APD-111), a United States Navy high-speed transport in commission from 1945 to 1946
- Walsh baronets, two extinct titles, one in the Baronetage of Ireland and one in the Baronetage of the United Kingdom
- Walsh convention, a bidding convention in contract bridge

== See also ==
- Walshe (disambiguation)
- Welsh (disambiguation)
