= George Goodwin Jr. =

American politician (1786–1878)

Personal details
- Born: April 23, 1786 Hartford, Connecticut, U.S.
- Died: February 8, 1878 (aged 91) East Hartford, Connecticut, U.S.
- Spouse: Maria Kingsbury (m. 1809; died 1851)
- Children: 10
- Education: Yale College
- Occupation: Politician; publisher; businessman

George Goodwin Jr. (April 23, 1786 – February 8, 1878) was an American publisher, businessman, and politician.

== Early life ==
George Goodwin Jr. was born on April 23, 1786, in Hartford, Connecticut, as the fourth child and third son of Mary (née Edwards) and George Goodwin. He graduated from Yale College in 1806.

== Career ==
Following graduation, Goodwin worked in the grocery business in Hartford with Spencer Whiting under the name Whiting & Goodwin. He later continued the firm as George & Charles Goodwin until 1815. He then worked as a housekeeper in the Ledlie House. In 1818, his father's firm Hudson & Goodwin dissolved and the firm George Goodwin & Sons succeeded it in the business of printing, publishing, and bookselling. The leading interest of the business was the Connecticut Courant, a weekly paper that remained as part of the company until it was sold to John L. Boswell in 1836. They had a mill in East Hartford for manufacturing the paper. Goodwin moved to Burnside, East Hartford in 1821 and remained there until 1861.

Goodwin represented East Hartford in the Connecticut Legislature three times.

== Personal life ==
Goodwin married Maria Kingsbury, daughter of Mary (née Osborn) and Andrew Kingsbury, of Hartford on November 25, 1809. They had 10 children, including Maria, Elizabeth, Andrew Kingsbury, Elizabeth, Ellen, Mary Edwards, George Henry, Susan Leavitt, and Harriet Talcott. His wife died in 1851. His first cousin Susan Leavitt Goodwin married Hartford politician Henry Kirke White Welch.

Around 1861, Goodwin started to lose his sight and by 1868 he was completely blind. He was a member of the Ecclesiastical Society. He died on February 8, 1878, at his home in Burnside, East Hartford.
