= Patrick Welch (disambiguation) =

Patrick Welch (1948–2020) was a member of the Illinois Senate.

Patrick Welch may also refer to:

- Patrick Welch (died 1802), Irish MP for Thomastown and Gowran
- Patrick Welch (died 1816), Irish MP for Callan
- Patrick W. Welch (1965–2008), English artist

== See also ==
- George Patrick Welch (1900–1973), historian and author
- Patrick Welsh (disambiguation)
- Welch (surname)
