= Daniel Welch =

Daniel Welch may refer to:

- Daniel Welch (ice hockey) (born 1981), American professional ice hockey player
- Daniel Welch (racing driver) (born 1982), British auto racing driver
- Danny Welch, American biologist

== See also ==
- Dan Welcher (born 1948), American composer, conductor, and music educator
