= Danny Welch =

Danny Ray Welch is an American cancer biologist and founding director of the University of Kansas Medical Center's Department of Cancer Biology. Welch is also a professor at the University of Kansas School of Medicine and director of the National Foundation for Cancer Research (NFCR) Center for Metastasis Research at KU. His research is in the area of metastasis suppressor genes and the biology of metastasis.

He is known for his discovery of a number of metastasis suppressor genes. By definition, these genes suppress metastasis without suppressing growth of the primary tumor. He is also well known for his work in defining the characters of cancer metastasis, and for his mentoring.

In 1996, Welch's lab in Hershey, Pennsylvania, isolated a cDNA from a cancer cell that was not able to undergo metastasis after the human chromosome 6 was added to the cell. This gene was named KISS1 because of the location of where it was discovered (Hershey, Pennsylvania, home of Hershey's Kisses). Introduction of this chromosome into the once-active cancer cell inhibited it from spreading and the cDNA responsible was taken from that cell. The fact that KISS1 was responsible for this was proved when it was transfected into melanoma cells and yet again, metastasis was suppressed.

He is a member of the editorial board of the Cancer and Metastasis Reviews.

He is the author of the book Cancer Metastasis – Related Genes (Cancer Metastasis—Biology and Treatment, Volume 3) by Kluwer Academic Publications (now Springer). He has authored over 140 original research papers in the area of cancer biology and metastasis. Welch is one of the few researchers whose research has focused on unraveling the biology of cancer metastasis from the very beginning of his research career.

== Selected published works ==
- Bodenstine TM, Welch DR. Metastasis suppressors and the tumor microenvironment. Cancer Microenviron. 2008 Dec;1(1):1-11.
- Shin R, Welch DR, Mishra VK, Nash KT, Hurst DR, Rama Krishna N. Clin Exp Metastasis. 2009 Mar 24
- Stafford LJ, Vaidya KS, Welch DR. Metastasis suppressors genes in cancer. Int J Biochem Cell Biol. 2008;40(5):874-91
- Vaidya KS, Welch DR. Metastasis suppressors and their roles in breast carcinoma. J Mammary Gland Biol Neoplasia. 2007 Sep;12(2-3):175-90.
- Eccles SA, Welch DR. Metastasis: recent discoveries and novel treatment strategies. Lancet. 2007 May 19;369(9574):1742-57
- Rinker-Schaeffer CW, O'Keefe JP, Welch DR, Theodorescu D. Metastasis suppressor proteins: discovery, molecular mechanisms, and clinical application. Clin Cancer Res. 2006 Jul 1;12(13):3882-9.
