= Goddard Hall (New Mexico State University) =

- U.S. National Register of Historic Places
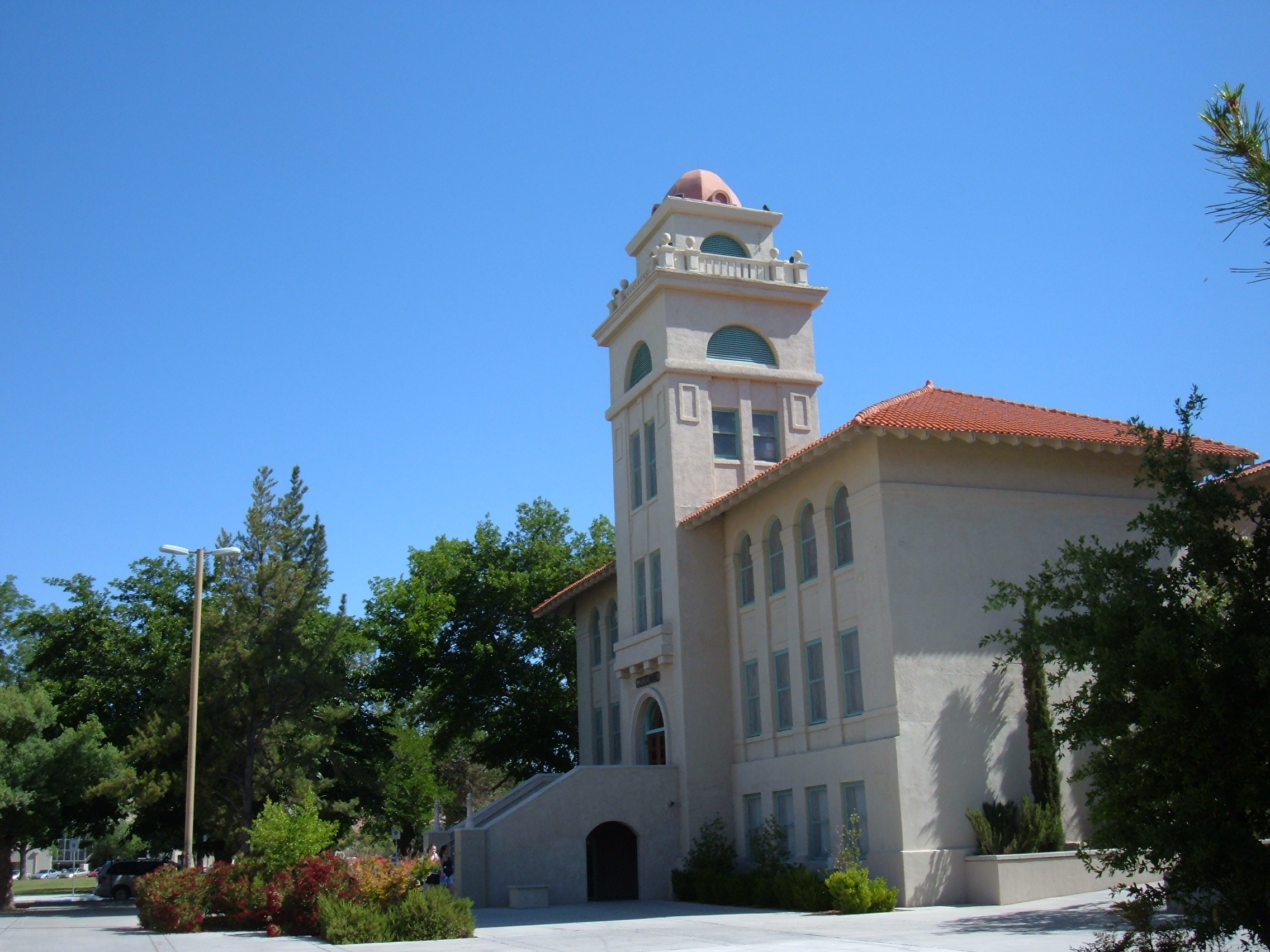

- Location within New Mexico Location within the United States
- Location: S. Horseshoe between Espina and Sweet, NMSU, Las Cruces, New Mexico
- Coordinates: 32°16′53″N 106°45′13″W
- Area: 0.5 acres (0.20 ha)
- Built: 1913
- Architect: Otto H. Thorman
- Architectural style: Mission/Spanish Revival, California Mission Revival
- MPS: New Mexico Campus Buildings Built 1906--1937 TR
- NRHP reference No.: 88001548
- Added to NRHP: September 22, 1988

Goddard Hall of New Mexico State University is a historic building in Las Cruces, New Mexico. It is located on S. Horseshoe between Espina and Sweet on the NMSU campus. It was listed on the National Register of Historic Places in 1988.

It was built in 1913. It is a three-story masonry and stucco building with a bell tower. It has a hipped French Tile roof.

"Goddard Hall is a three story masonry and stucco building with a hipped French Tile roof and overhand supported by rafter extensions. The building has a bell tower that forms the entrance. Third level has arched windows formed by pilasters springing from the top of the ground floor. The windows are 1/1 double hung with retro-fitted solar shades. There are relief panels below the windows. There has been a large addition on the east side of the building (1936); however, the entrance on the west side of the building and the two ends of the building have been kept in original condition. Goddard Hall was built in 1913. The architect was Otto H. Thorman, and the historical and current use is as classrooms. The original building has a rectangular shape."

"Goddard Hall is one of two buildings constructed in the California Mission Revival Style and one of four buildings on the New Mexico State University campus included in this nomination. Goddard Hall is significant because it is one of the original campus buildings built on the "Horseshoe" as part of Trost and Trost's campus plan from 1906. Although a "Spanish Renaissance" style was adopted by the Regent's, Trost and Trost used more of an "eclectic Mission Style" under their plan. In keeping with this style, Thorman used a more traditional California Mission Style when he designed Goddard Hall, including a bell tower. Since its construction in 1913, Goddard Hall has provided classroom space for NMSU students and faculty."
