= The Touch of the Master's Hand =

Christian poem and song

"The Touch of the Master's Hand", also sometimes called The Old Violin, is a Christian poem written in 1921 by Myra Brooks Welch.

The poem tells of a battered old violin that is about to be sold as the last item at an auction for a pittance, until a violinist steps out of the audience and plays the instrument, demonstrating its beauty and true value. The violin then sells for $3,000 instead of a mere $3. The poem ends by comparing this instrument touched by the hand of a master musician to the life of a sinner that is touched by the hand of God.

== Biblical allusions ==
Mess of pottage is used to describe that for which a sinner might sell his or her soul. This term was first coined by John Capgrave in reference to the Biblical story of Esau selling his birthright to Jacob for lentil stew, found in Genesis 25:29–34.

== Legacy ==
Welch's famous poem inspired other works. The poem was adapted into song lyrics and set to music by John Kramp in 1974 while a freshman at Baylor University. The song was recorded by Contemporary Christian artist Wayne Watson for his first album Workin' In The Final Hour in 1980 and re-recorded 12 years later on his How Time Flies compilation project.

A short film also titled The Touch of the Master's Hand won the Short Film Jury Award – U.S. Fiction at the 2021 Sundance Film Festival.

== Adaptations ==
The poem has been adapted into three films:

- Touch of the Master's Hand (1980) directed by Jimmy Murphy
- The Touch of the Master's Hand (1987) directed by T. C. Christensen
- The Touch of the Master's Hand (2021) directed by Gregory Willis Barnes

== About the author ==
Myra Brooks Welch was born in 1877 and died in 1959. While she authored many other poems, she is best known for this work.
