= George Welsh =

George Welsh may refer to:

== Politicians ==
- George Austin Welsh (1878–1970), U.S. Representative from Pennsylvania
- George Arthur Welsh (1896–1965), Canadian flying ace, farmer and political figure
- George W. Welsh (1883–1974), politician from Michigan

== Others ==
- George Welsh (Australian footballer) (1896–1983), Australian rules footballer
- George Welsh (American football) (1933–2019), American college football coach
- George Schlager Welsh (1918–1990), personality researcher

== See also ==
- George Welsh Currie (1870–1950), British politician
- George Welch (disambiguation)
