= George Welch =

George Welch may refer to:

- George Welch (pilot) (1918–1954), flying ace and test pilot
- George Welch, head of the Pittsburgh Academy in 1789
- George Patrick Welch (1900–1973), historian and author
- George W. Welch (architect) (1886–?), American architect
- George W. Welch (Medal of Honor), American soldier and Medal of Honor recipient

== See also ==
- George Welsh (disambiguation)
