= Michael Welch =

Michael or Mike Welch may refer to:

- Michael Welch (actor) (born 1987), American actor
- Michael Welch (footballer) (born 1982), Irish footballer
- Micky Welch (born 1958), Barbadian/English football player
- Mickey Welch (1859–1941), baseball player
- Mike Welch (American football) (born 1951), American football coach, head football coach at Ithaca College, 1994–2016
- Mike Welch (baseball) (born 1972), former right-handed pitcher in Major League Baseball

== See also ==
- Michael Welsh (disambiguation)
