= General Welch =

General Welch may refer to:

- Larry D. Welch (born 1934), U.S. Air Force four-star general
- Nick Welch (British Army officer) (born c. 1964), British Army major general
- Ron Welch (born 1960), U.S. Army brigadier general
- William H. Welch (1850–1934), U.S. Army brigadier general

== See also ==
- General Welsh (disambiguation)
