= Frank Welch =

Frank Welch may refer to:

- Frank Welch (American politician) (1835–1878), Nebraska Republican politician
- Frank A. Welch (born 1959), Master Chief Petty Officer of the U.S. Coast Guard
- Frank Welch (baseball) (1897–1957), baseball player
- Frank Corbett Welch (1900–1986), Canadian exporter, farmer, horticulturist, and Senator

== See also ==
- Fran Welch (1895–1970), athletics coach
