= Pat Welsh (author) =

Patricia Ruth Fisher-Smith Welsh, also known as Pat Welsh and Patricia Fisher, (born 1929) is an American television performer, columnist, garden editor, public speaker, and author.

Welsh is known for her books, videos, and television programs on gardening. She is also known as an early advocate of using Mediterranean gardening techniques in the coastal areas of California.

== Early years ==
She was born in Halifax, Yorkshire, England, in 1929 to Emerson Lyman Fisher-Smith and Ruth Beatrice Ambler. Her parents were socialites who lost their money and residence in the Wall Street crash of 1929. The family was forced to live with their parents; they went first to the Gleddings and then to Hoyle Court. After her parents divorced, they both moved separately to the United States, leaving the children in England until they became eligible to emigrate. In 1939, Welsh and her siblings arrived in New York City.

Welsh's family moved into a farmhouse in Bucks County, Pennsylvania farm. During here time there, Welsh learned sculpture, watercolor painting, and numerous outdoor skills. She was inspired to become a writer by family friendships with James Michener, Pearl Buck, William L. White, and Oscar Hammerstein II.

In 1944, the family moved to Southern California. Welsh graduated from Hollywood High School, received a B.A. from Scripps College in Claremont, California.

On June 8, 1951, she married Maximilian Welsh, a Los Angeles trial lawyer for the Santa Fe Railroad. He later became a California Superior Court Judge and was a founder of the San Diego Inn of Court. In 1956, the couple built a home in Del Mar, California that was designed by John Lloyd Wright, They had two children, Francesca Filanc and Wendy Woolf.

== Early career ==
During the 1960s, Welsh began her career as an authority and television personality. She started writing travel and self-help articles, published under the names Patricia Fisher and Patricia Welsh, in the Los Angeles Times and other newspapers. In 1975, she began lecturing on gardening at the University of California, San Diego Extension. In 1979 she became the first Garden Editor of San Diego Home/Garden Magazine.

In 1981 Welsh was hired as the host of an evening news segment called "Newscenter 39’s Resident Gardener" on KNSD in San Diego. This was the first regularly scheduled garden news segment aired on the evening news by a network station. During her time at KNSD, she planned, wrote, and performed over 500 practical gardening segments plus one grand promo weekly and two teases. The show lasted five years. During its time, Welsh's show helped raised public awareness of gardening in her area. Patricia won a San Diego Emmy Award for News Performer. She continued for several years in local and nationwide television as a freelance writer and performer.

== Later years ==
In the late 1990s Welsh made two gardening videos for the Meredith Corporation, the publisher of Better Homes and Gardens magazine. "Foolproof Flowerbeds", written and performed by Welsh and filmed in Descanso Gardens, La Cañada Flintridge, California, won the Garden Writers' of America Quill and Trowel Award for Best Video of 1990. The success of this video led to another called "Landscape Problems Solved". This was followed by infomercials, national TV programs, and eight shows on the Home/Garden network filmed in Nashville, Tennessee in 1996.

In 1988 Welsh returned as a columnist to San Diego Home/Garden Magazine, In 1991, Chronicle Books published Pat Welsh’s Southern California Gardening: A Month-by-Month Gardening Guide, the first major gardening book "written exclusively for the unique climate and conditions of Southern California". This book stayed in print for twenty years, selling close to 100,00 copies. In January 2010, the new all-organic edition entitled Pat Welsh’s Southern California Organic Gardening, Month by Month was published by Chronicle Books.

== Gardening philosophy ==
Welsh strongly believe that Californians should use gardening techniques suited to their climate rather than the climates of England and the Eastern United States. She urged gardeners to grow drought-resistant plants and use techniques and timing of garden tasks appropriate to a Mediterranean climate: plentiful sunshine, mild temperatures, and dry summers with most rainfall occurring in fall, winter, and spring. Welsh's approach combines the artistic elements of gardening, such as design and color, with practical skills for dealing with climate zones, soil types, plant materials, irrigation methods, and environmentally responsible methods of disease and pest control. An early emphasis on IPM (Integrated Pest Management) was later replaced by a firm conviction that chemical pesticides have no place in the home garden. Patrician now urges gardeners to use Organic horticulture methods with organic fertilizer in place of synthetic ones.

== Artistic ventures ==
Welsh is also a sculptor and painter in watercolor and oils. Her professional art projects include the design and building of a 92-foot-long, multi-media mural completed in 2002 in collaboration with graphic artist Betsy Schulz and 80 volunteers. This mural is four feet tall and includes over thirty pieces of original terra cotta sculpture plus brick, Mexican river rock, and local memorabilia. It is located in Del Mar at the Public Library.

== Awards ==
- The San Diego Area Emmy Award for Performance, News
- The San Diego Press Club Award
- The National Quill and Trowel Award
- The Lifetime Achievement Award from Quail Botanical Gardens, Cuyamaca College Horticulturist of the Year
- San Diego Horticultural Society's Horticulturist of the Year.
- Honorary Master Gardener of San Diego

== Publications ==
- Pat Welsh's Southern California Gardening: A Month-by-Month Guide: Chronicle Books, 1991.
- Pat Welsh's Southern California Gardening: A Month-by-Month Guide, Completely Revised and Updated: * Chronicle Books, 2000.
- All My Edens: A Gardener's Memoir: Chronicle Books, 1996.
- The American Horticultural Society Southwest Smart Garden Regional Guide: D.K. Publishing, 2004.
- The Magic Mural and How it Got Built: A Fable for Children of All Ages: The Friends of the Del Mar Library, 2005.
- Pat Welsh's Southern California Organic Gardening, Month by Month: Chronicle Books, 1991.

== Videos ==
- "Foolproof Flowerbeds": Better Homes and Gardens and The Meredith Company, Inc.
- "Landscape Problems Solved": Better Homes and Gardens and The Meredith Company, Inc.
- "It Takes a Village…To Raise a Wall": Holliday, Phillips: Del Mar TV Foundation.
