= Herbert Welch =

Herbert, Herb or Bert Welch may refer to:

- Herbert George Welch (1862–1969), American Methodist bishop
- Herbert John Welch (1893–1959), politician in British Columbia, Canada
- Herb Welch (baseball) (1900–1967), backup shortstop in Major League Baseball
- Bert Welch (1912–?), English footballer for Rochdale
- Herb Welch (born 1961), American football player
