= Gregory Welch =

Canadian chemist

- Education: University of Calgary; University of Windsor
- Scientific career
- Institutions: University of Calgary; Dalhousie University; University of California, Santa Barbara

Gregory C. Welch is a Canadian chemist, currently a Canada Research Chair at University of Calgary.
