= Amy Welch =

Amy Welch (born 13 May 1985) is a journalist employed by ITN as a North of England Reporter for ITV News.

Previously she was a presenter and reporter for Granada Reports.

She is originally from Frodsham, Cheshire and attended University of Central Lancashire and a new face of That's Lancashire from 8 June 2018.
