= Cris Welch =

American football coach

Coaching career (HC unless noted)
- 2003–2009: Graceland

Head coaching record
- Overall: 39–33
- Tournaments: 1–1 (NAIA playoffs)

Accomplishments and honors

Championships
- 1 HAAC (2005)

Awards
- 1 HAAC Coach of the Year (2005)

Cris Welch is an American former football coach. He served as the head coach at Graceland University in Lamoni, Iowa from 2003 to 2009, aiding a turnaround that resulted in the 2005 squad reaching the NAIA playoffs after finishing 0–10 just three years prior.

== Head coaching record ==
Year	Team	Overall	Conference	Standing	Bowl/playoffs	NAIA^{#}
Graceland Yellowjackets (Heart of America Athletic Conference) (2003–2009)
2003	Graceland	5–5	5–5	T–4th		
2004	Graceland	8–2	8–2	T–2nd		18
2005	Graceland	9–3	8–2	T–1st	L NAIA Quarterfinal	13
2006	Graceland	6–4	6–4	4th		
2007	Graceland	6–4	6–4	T–4th		
2008	Graceland	2–8	2–8	T–9th		
2009	Graceland	3–7	3–7	T–7th		
Graceland:		39–33	38–32			
Total:		39–33				
National championship Conference title Conference division title or championship game berth
