= American Bungalow =

- Categories: Shelter magazine
- Frequency: Quarterly
- Founder: John Brinkmann
- First issue: September 1990; 34 years ago
- Company: John Brinkmann Design Offices, Inc.
- Country: United States
- Based in: Sierra Madre, California
- Language: English
- Website: ambungalow.com
- ISSN: 1055-0674

American Bungalow is a quarterly special interest magazine whose stated purpose is "preserving and restoring the modest American 20th Century home, the bungalow, and the rich lifestyle it affords." Since its introduction in 1990, the publication has been a major spur to the revitalization of interest in homes in the bungalow architectural style and their connection to the original and contemporary Arts and Crafts movement. The magazine and its advertisers are a popular resource for bungalow owners and architects.

== History ==
In 1987, John Brinkmann moved into Twycross House, a 1914 airplane bungalow in Sierra Madre, California. The difficulty of finding replacement parts for the house led him to begin publishing a newsletter to exchange information about the house style. It quickly was re-branded into a magazine so Brinkmann could accept advertising. He launched American Bungalow magazine in September 1990.

From the start, the magazine's appeal was assisted by renewed nationwide interest in the Arts and Crafts Movement, both in Europe in the late 19th century and in America at the turn of the 20th century. Articles on the movement's philosophy and its connection to the ubiquitous bungalow house style were a revelation to many readers who owned or aspired to own modest bungalows.

From its first issue, which featured a historic bungalow neighborhood in San Jose, California, the magazine has also featured historic bungalow neighborhoods around the country, encouraging their preservation and cheering their revival, including in Chicago, where in 2001 Brinkmann presented Mayor Richard Daley, Jr. with an “Award of Appreciation” honoring the city's Historic Chicago Bungalow Initiative.

The magazine has also championed the work of vintage and contemporary masters of Arts and Crafts furniture making, metalwork, ceramics, textiles, leather and other domestic furnishings, along the way featuring some of the most admired collections of such works in the U.S.

It was among the first national publications to draw attention to the strong affinities between these works and their makers and those produced in a similar spirit by Native Americans artisans, especially those inhabiting the continent's Southwest, which was undergoing rapid exploration and settlement at the turn of the 20th century.

In 2003, the editors of the Chicago Tribune’s “Tempo” cultural and arts magazine named American Bungalow one of the nation's “50 Best Magazines.”

American Bungalow’s first years were marked by sporadic publication and few advertisers, but by 1995 a widespread interest in bungalows and bungalow neighborhoods began to take hold in many areas of the United States, Canada, Australia and New Zealand, leading to increased circulation. American Bungalow now enjoys a relatively small but loyal readership and is available worldwide, although its circulation is primarily within the United States and Canada.

== Financial difficulties ==
In 2019, American Bungalow published only one issue, Issue 98. Typically, 4 issues are published each year. On January 24, 2020, editor John Brinkmann sent an e-mail to subscribers and also posted a letter on American Bungalow's website, detailing financial difficulties and offering back issues at a substantial discount, in an effort to raise funds. Brinkmann informed subscribers that Issues 99 and 100 were completed, but could not be printed due to lack of funds. Subscribers responded with donations and support, and the magazine published its next two issues out of schedule during pandemic conditions (Issue 99 as Spring 2020, Issue 100 as Spring 2021).

== Features ==
American Bungalow features articles on topics such as:

- Arts and Crafts collectibles, fixtures and furnishings
- Arts and Crafts philosophy
- Arts and Crafts style lodges and resorts
- Bungalow architecture
- Bungalow décor, interiors and exteriors
- Bungalow restoration
- Bungalow neighborhoods and neighborhood preservation
- Mission furniture
- New construction in the Craftsman style
- Period graphics and posters
- Remodels and additions
- Simple living

== See also ==
- California Bungalow
- Arts and Crafts Movement
