= Thomas Welsh =

Thomas Welsh may refer to:

== Sports ==
- Thomas Welsh (swimmer) (1933–2021), British swimmer
- Thomas Welsh (rower) (born 1977), American rower
- Thomas Welsh (basketball) (born 1996), American basketball player

== Others ==
- Thomas Welsh (composer) (c. 1780–1848), English composer and operatic singer
- Thomas Welsh (general) (1824–1863), brigadier general during the American Civil War
- Thomas Welsh (bishop) (1921–2009), American Roman Catholic bishop
- T.A. Welsh, British film producer

== See also ==
- Thomas Welch (disambiguation)
- Thomas Walsh (disambiguation)
