= Peter Welsh =

Peter Welsh may refer to:

- Peter Welsh (athlete) (born 1943), New Zealand steeplechase runner
- Peter Welsh (footballer, born 1951), Australian rules footballer for Footscray
- Peter Welsh (footballer, born 1954) (1954–2008), Australian rules footballer for Hawthorn and Richmond
- Peter Welsh (Scottish footballer) (born 1959), Leicester City, Hibernian, Falkirk and Alloa Athletic player

== See also ==
- Peter Welch (born 1947), American politician
- Peter Welch (actor) (1922–1984), British actor
