= Tommy Walsh (Wicklow Gaelic footballer) =

Irish hurler and Gaelic footballer

Personal information
- Born: Carlow, Ireland

Sport
- Sport: Gaelic football
- Position: -
Club titles
- Wicklow titles: ?
- Leinster titles: ?
Inter-county
- Years: County
- 2007–2009: Wicklow
Inter-county titles
- Leinster titles: 0
- All Stars: 0

Tommy Walsh is a Carlow Gaelic footballer, who has also played with Wicklow. He plays for the Fenagh club. He also played hurling with Carlow.

== Career ==
Walsh won the Tommy Murphy Cup with Wicklow in 2007. There were then rumours about a possible return to Carlow under new manager Paul Bealin. Tommy then played with Wicklow against Dublin in the O'Byrne Cup and confirmed that he would remain with Mick O'Dwyer. However, his return to Carlow was announced in April 2010 to face his former Wiclow colleagues in 16 May's Leinster Senior Football Championship opener.

== Personal life ==
Tommy is the brother of Carlow footballer Patrick Walsh.
