= Thomas Stephen Walsh =

Irish police officer

Thomas Stephen Walsh (10 January 1925 – 18 May 2003) was a senior Irish police officer (Garda Inspector 9369F) who received the Scott Medal.

Walsh was born near Castlebar, County Mayo, becoming a member of the Garda Síochána on 6 June 1944.

On 14 December 1972, he and Detective Sergeant Myles Hawkshaw were members of a party to carry out a search for firearms at a farm near Dundalk. They encountered four men, three of whom ran off; however, the fourth, armed and wearing bandoliers, aimed at the unarmed Guards. Walsh and Hawkshaw wrestled him to the ground; the gun was found to be fully loaded and ready to fire. A search uncovered three rifles and two bandoliers in a shed.

Both men were awarded the Scott Medal at Templemore in November 1973. Walsh was later promoted to Superintendent, served in the Donegal division, and retired on 17 January 1985.
