= Edward Welch House =

- U.S. National Register of Historic Places
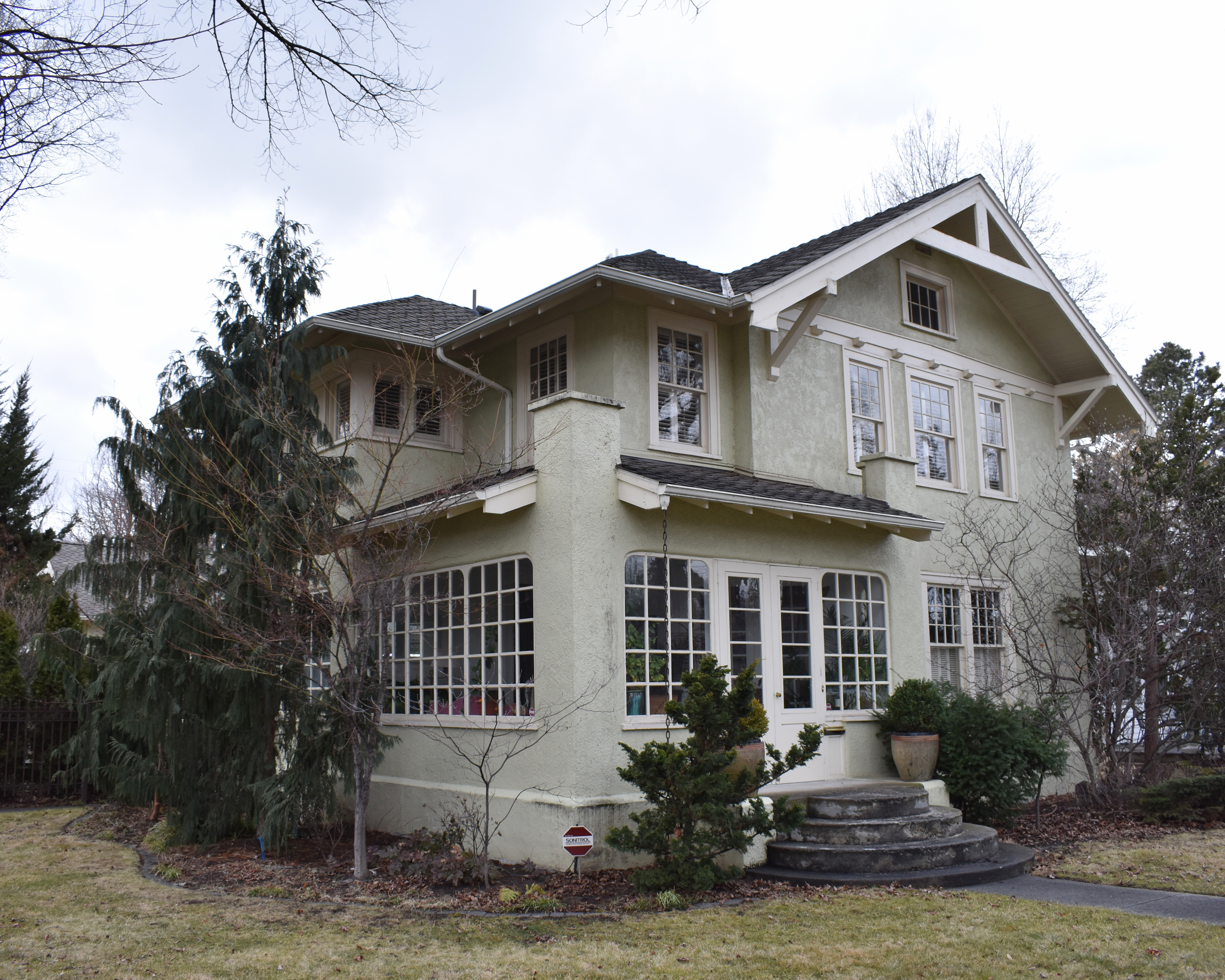
- The Edward Welch House in 2019

- Location within Idaho Location within the United States
- Location: 1321 E. Jefferson St., Boise, Idaho
- Coordinates: 43°36′26″N 116°10′38″W
- Area: less than one acre
- Built: 1912
- Architect: Tourtellotte & Hummel
- Architectural style: Bungalow/craftsman
- MPS: Tourtellotte and Hummel Architecture TR
- NRHP reference No.: 82000253
- Added to NRHP: November 17, 1982

The Edward Welch House in Boise, Idaho, is a 2-story Bungalow designed by Tourtellotte & Hummel and constructed in 1912. The house includes a prominent gable above an outset, 2-story bay to the right of a projecting porch. The porch features two square columns rising on either side above a shed roof over the main entry. The house was added to the National Register of Historic Places (NRHP) in 1982.

Although the NRHP nomination form refers to the Edward Welch House, Mr. Welch may not have owned the house nor lived there. Tene E. Welch petitioned for divorce from her husband, Edward Welch, in December 1911. In September 1912 Mrs. Welch announced plans to build the house, and she purchased lots 11 and 12 in block 2 of Boise's Warm Springs Addition where the house is located. In 1925 Mrs. Welch installed glass windows in the open-air porch. With the omission of Mr. Welch from documents and with Mrs. Welch listed as the property owner, it may be more accurate to refer to the house as the Tene E. Welch House.

== See also ==
- Warm Springs Avenue Historic District
