= Welch Hall =

Welch Hall may refer to:

- Welch Hall (Eastern Michigan University), administration building on the Eastern Michigan University campus and listed under the National Register of Historic Places
- Welch Hall (Missouri), a current fraternity house and former military academy in Columbia, Missouri
- Welch Hall (University of Texas at Austin), a building on the campus at the University of Texas at Austin
- Welch Hall (Yale), a freshman dormitory at Yale University in New Haven, Connecticut
