= Spring Grove Cemetery (Hartford, Connecticut) =

Historic cemetery in Hartford County, Connecticut

- U.S. National Register of Historic Places
- U.S. Historic district
- September 2026, cemetery is overgrown

- Location within Connecticut Location within the United States
- Location: 2035 Main Street, Hartford, Connecticut
- Coordinates: 41.7828775°N 72.6795373°W
- Area: 33.7 acres (13.6 ha)
- Built: 1844
- Architect: Clunnie, Thomas M.
- Architectural style: Mid 19th Century Revival, Late 19th And 20th Century Revivals
- NRHP reference No.: 08001203
- Added to NRHP: January 20, 2011

Spring Grove Cemetery is a cemetery on Main Street in the Clay-Arsenal neighborhood of Hartford, Connecticut. Established in 1845, it is one of the city's oldest cemeteries, and its first private non-sectarian cemetery. Its burials include a number of the city's high-profile civic and business leaders, as well as a substantial indigent population, and artist Frederic Edwin Church. It was listed on the National Register of Historic Places in 2011.

== Description and history ==
Spring Grove Cemetery is located north of downtown Hartford, on the west side of Main Street between Mahl Avenue and Capen Street in the Clay-Arsenal neighborhood. Overall, it covers about 34 acres (14 ha) of flat terrain that has some gentle undulations. It is accessed via a wrought-iron archway on Main Street, which provides access to its network of circulating roads. These roads are laid out in a rectilinear grid, and are finished in a combination of pavement, gravel, and grass. The oldest monument is that of the Page family, and is dated 1845. Its basic layout has been little altered since its founding, and it retains most of its 19th-century features; a memorial chapel built in 1884 was destroyed by fire in 1904.

The land on which the cemetery was established was farmland owned by the Page family when Stephen Page buried his wife there in 1845. The Pages then proceeded to sell burial plots (in contrast to typical cemetery practice of selling a right-to-interment) to others. In 1864, a number of plot owners banded together to purchase the entire cemetery, establishing the non-profit association that now manages the property three years later. In 1884, the association hired landscape designer Thomas Brown McClunnie to lay out the cemetery's northwest quadrant. In contrast to the rural cemetery movement, McClunnie's parklike setting emphasized a simple rectangular layout, rather than winding lanes that conformed to local topography.

== Notable burials ==
- Frances Ellen Burr (1831-1923)
- Frederic Edwin Church (1826–1900)
- Ezra Clark Jr. (1813–1896)
- Laurent Clerc (1785–1869)
- Henry C. Deming (1815–1872)
- William W. Eaton (1816–1898)
- E. Hart Fenn (1856–1939)
- Lydia Sigourney (1791–1865)
- Henry Kirke White Welch (1821–1870), state politician
- Henry Clay Work (1832–1884)

== See also ==
- National Register of Historic Places listings in Hartford, Connecticut
