= Justice Welch =

Justice Welch may refer to:

- Samuel Earl Welch (1892–1969), associate justice of the Oklahoma Supreme Court
- William H. Welch (judge) (1805–1863), chief justice of the Territorial Supreme Court of Minnesota
- Elizabeth M. Welch (born 1970), associate justice of the Michigan Supreme Court
