= Robert Welch =

Robert Welch may refer to:

== People ==
- Robert Welch (designer) (1929–2000), British designer and silversmith
- Robert Welch (San Jose), mayor of San Jose, California from 1962–1964
- Robert Welch (photographer) (1859–1936), Irish photographer
- Robert Welch (Wisconsin politician) (born 1958), Wisconsin politician
- Robert Welch or Robert Fuller, American wrestler
- Robert Anthony Welch (1947–2013), Irish author and scholar
- Robert Alonzo Welch (1872–1952), American industrialist and founder of the Robert A. Welch Foundation for chemistry research in Texas
- Robert S. Welch (1944–2016), American academic administrator
- Robert V. Welch (1927–1992), American businessman, politician, and civic leader
- Robert W. Welch Jr. (1899–1985), American anti-communist and co-founder of the John Birch Society
- Bo Welch (Robert Welch, born 1951), American film production designer

== Other ==
- Robert Welch University, online university

== See also ==
- Bob Welch (disambiguation)
- J. Robert Welsh, electric utilities executive
