= George W. Welch (Medal of Honor) =

American Union soldier during Civil War

George W. Welch (1843 - ?) was an American soldier who was awarded the Medal of Honor during the American Civil War. The medal was presented on 24 February 1865 for actions with 11th Missouri Infantry at the Battle of Nashville on 16 December 1864.

== Medal of Honor Citation ==
for extraordinary heroism on 16 December 1864, in action at Nashville, Tennessee. Private Welch captured the flag of the 13th Alabama Infantry (Confederate States of America).
