= Patrick Welsh =

Patrick Welsh may refer to:

- Patrick Welsh (baseball), see Ohio State League
- Patrick Welsh (gangster), see Arthur Thompson (gangster)
- Patrick Welsh of Welsh, Carson, Anderson & Stowe
- Patrick T. Welsh (1950–2007), American politician

== See also ==
- Pat Welsh (disambiguation)
- Patrick Welch (disambiguation)
- Patrick Walsh (disambiguation)
