= James Welsh (East India Company officer) =

Madras Army officer

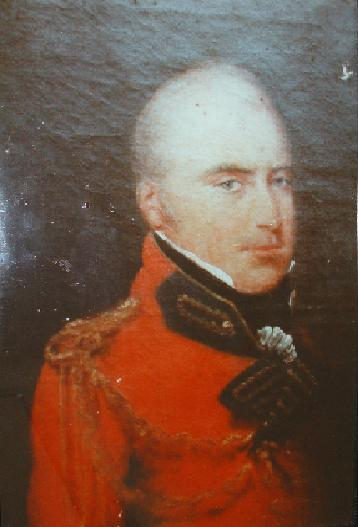
- Portrait by Zoffany, c. 1840
- Born: 12 March 1775; Great Britain
- Died: 24 January 1861 (aged 85); Bath, Somerset, England
- Spouse: Sarah Light (m. 1794)
- Relatives: Francis Light (father-in-law); William Light (brother-in-law)
- Military career
- Allegiance: East India Company
- Branch: Madras Army
- Service years: 1790–1848
- Rank: General
- Conflicts: War of the First Coalition; Second Anglo-Maratha War; Travancore Rebellion; Malabar Rebellions

General James Welsh (12 March 1775 – 24 January 1861) was a Madras Army officer.

== Biography ==
Welsh, son of John Welsh, a Scotsman, was born on 12 March 1775. He obtained a commission as ensign in the Madras Army on 22 May 1790, and arrived at Madras on 23 January 1791. He joined the 3rd Madras European Regiment at Vellore, and in November ascended the ghats with Colonel Floyd's detachment to serve in the grand army under Lord Cornwallis.

Welsh was promoted to be lieutenant in the 24th Native Infantry on 1 November 1792, and took part with it in the siege of Pondicherry in July and August 1793. Transferred in 1795 to the 9th Native Infantry at Mandura, he served at the capture of Colombo and Ceylon in February 1796, and remained at Point-de-Galle as fort-adjutant until the end of 1798, when he was transferred in the same capacity to Machlipatnam.

On 10 December 1799 Welsh was promoted to be captain, and appointed adjutant and quartermaster of the 3rd Native Infantry, which in 1803 formed part of a force under Major-General Arthur Wellesley to operate against the Marathas. He marched with it across India to Poona, and in June took part in the siege of Ahmadnagar. The town (pettah) was successfully stormed on 8 August and after a bombardment the fortress of Ahmadnagar surrendered on 12 August.

Welsh served on the staff at the Battle of Argaum (29 November), in the siege and assault (15 December) of Gawilgarh, and led a body of 250 men, after a forced march of 54 miles (87 km), to the capture of Mankarsir on 6 February 1804. He was appointed judge-advocate and assistant surveyor to the Poonah subsidiary force, and, marching with it, and took part in the assault and capture of the hill fort at Chandore on 10 August 1804 and the occupation of the hill fort of Dhoorp on 14 October. He commanded a party of 300 men at the capture of the pettah and outworks of the hill fort of Galnah, on 26 October, and on 13 November proceeded with a small force to open communication through a difficult country, with Surat, where he arrived on 25 November. In December Welsh was sent on a mission to a Bhil chief by an unexplored pass to the northward, and caught a malignant fever which clung to him for many years.

On 15 May 1805 Welsh succeeded to the command of his battalion at Poona, continuing to hold his staff appointment until the end of the year, when he marched with his regiment to Palamcottai in the Carnatic, arriving on 27 March. He was in command there on 19 November, when, as the garrison were assembling under arms, he discovered a plot among the native troops to murder all the Europeans at the station. Acting with the greatest promptitude, he seized the ringleaders, disarmed the native soldiers, and expelled the Muslim troops from the fort. He was tried by court-martial for precipitate conduct in having disarmed the native garrison with insufficient cause, but was honourably acquitted on 20 March 1807, and congratulated by government on this vindication of his reputation. However the governor of Madras, Lord William Bentinck qualified his support by adding the general orders on that day that in his opinion "To involve the innocent with the guilty, and include in a sweeping implication of guilt, a numerous body of men, on the ground of general suspicion or apprehension, is a mode of proceeding which … no just Government can tolerate".

Welsh was promoted to be major on 22 May 1807, and went home on furlough. rejoining his regiment on 5 February 1809 before the lines of Travancore, where it formed part of a force under Colonel St. Leger, Welsh led the storming party in the successful assault of those formidable defences on the night of 10 February. He was mentioned in despatches, and the court of directors of the East India Company bore high testimony to his services on the occasion, observing that the achievement reflected the utmost credit on Welsh, "who led the storming party in a manner that does singular honour to his intrepidity and perseverance". On 19 February 1809 he led the advance from the south, and was successful in capturing several hill forts, arriving at Trivandrum, the capital of Travancore, on 2 March.

In April 1812 he commanded a small force sent to quell a rising in the Wainad, which he accomplished after a month of heavy marching and desultory fighting. He was promoted to be lieutenant-colonel on 25 January 1813, and was appointed deputy judge-advocate-general, residing at Bangalore.

On 6 February 1821 Welsh was appointed to command the troops in the provinces of Malabar and Kanara; on 6 May 1823 to command at Vellore; on 23 January 1824 to command in Travancore and Cochin; and on 1 August 1826 to command the Doab field force. He arrived at Belgaum in September, and was immediately engaged with the Resident in measures which were successful in preventing a threatened rising at Kolhapur.

Early in 1829 Welsh went to England on furlough. He was promoted to be colonel on 5 June. In the following year he published Military Reminiscences, from a Journal of nearly forty years' Active Service in the East Indies, with over ninety illustrations (2 vols. 8vo, two editions). The work remains useful for its descriptions of places and military incidents in southern India.

Welsh did not return to India until his promotion to major-general on 10 January 1837. He was appointed on 1 June to the command of the northern division, Madras presidency, to which was added, in November 1838, the command in Katak. He was promoted lieutenant-general on 9 November 1846, and relinquished his command on 16 February following. On leaving India the governor in council expressed the high sense entertained of the gallantry and zeal which had marked his service of fifty-eight years. He was promoted to be general on 20 June 1854. He died at North Parade, Bath, on 24 January 1861.

== Family ==
In 1794, Welsh married Sarah (a daughter of Francis Light, first governor of Prince of Wales Island, Penang) in Calcutta. The couple had numerous children.
