= Bob Welch =

Bob Welch may refer to:

- Bob Welch (baseball) (1956–2014), American baseball pitcher
- Bob Welch (author) (born c. 1955), American author and newspaper columnist
- Bob Welch (musician) (1945–2012), American musician and member of Fleetwood Mac
  - Bob Welch (album)
- Bob Welch (politician) (1928–2000), Canadian politician

== See also ==
- Robert Welch (disambiguation)
