= Paul Welsh =

Paul Welsh may refer to:

- Paul Welsh (journalist), British television and radio correspondent and presenter
- Paul Welsh (philosopher), American philosopher

== See also ==
- Paul Walsh (disambiguation)
