= Michael Welsh =

Michael Welsh may refer to:

- Michael Welsh (Labour politician) (1926–2012), British Member of Parliament for Doncaster
- Michael Welsh (Conservative politician) (born 1942), British former Member of the European Parliament
- Michael Welsh (Oregon politician), American politician and occupational safety professional
- Michael J. Welsh (biologist), American pulmonologist
- Mikey Welsh (1971–2011), American bassist

== See also ==
- Michael Welch (disambiguation)
