= James Welsh (Medal of Honor) =

American Union soldier during Civil War

James Welsh (May 11, 1846 - December 17, 1916) was an Irish born soldier who fought in the American Civil War and received the Medal of Honor. The medal was awarded on 3 June 1905 for actions as a private in the 4th Rhode Island Infantry at the Battle of the Crater, Petersburg, Virginia on 30 July 1864. He was born in Ireland and died in the former county of Elizabeth City, Virginia. He is buried in St. Paul Cemetery, Blackstone, Massachusetts.

== Medal of Honor Citation ==
For extraordinary heroism on 30 July 1864, in action at Petersburg, Virginia. Private Welsh bore off the regimental colors after the color sergeant had been wounded and the color corporal bearing the colors killed thereby saving the colors from capture.
