= Thomas Welch (disambiguation) =

Thomas Welch (1742–1816) was a surveyor and judge in Upper Canada

Thomas Welch may also refer to:

- Thomas Bramwell Welch (1825–1903), discoverer of the pasteurization process to prevent the fermentation of grape juice
- Thomas Welch (American football) (born 1987), NFL offensive tackle
- Thomas Welch (cricketer) (1906–1972), English cricketer
- Thomas Anthony Welch (1884–1959), American prelate of the Roman Catholic Church
- Thomas Vincent Welch (1850–1903), New York State Assemblyman
- Tom Welch (politician), American politician in Montana
- Tom Welch (curler) in WFG Tankard

== See also ==
- Thomas Welsh (disambiguation)
- Thomas Walsh (disambiguation)
