= Dick Welch =

Australian rules footballer (1913–2002)

Personal information
- Full name: Charles William Welch
- Born: 30 January 1913; Nagambie, Victoria
- Died: 17 October 2002 (aged 89); Heathcote, Victoria
- Original team: Nagambie
- Height: 182 cm (6 ft 0 in)
- Weight: 83 kg (183 lb)

Playing career^{1}
Years	Club	Games (Goals)
1936–38	Essendon	20 (4)
- ^{1} Playing statistics correct to the end of 1938.

Charles William "Dick" Welch (30 January 1913 – 17 October 2002) was an Australian rules footballer who played with Essendon in the Victorian Football League (VFL).

== Family ==
The son of Charles James Welch (1880-1936), and Ellen Maud Welch (1887-1975), née Sullivan, Charles William Welch was born at Nagambie, Victoria on 30 January 1913.

He married Ivy Estelle Heaven (1919-2003) at Ascot Vale, Victoria on 7 September 1940. They had one child; a daughter, Julie-Ann.

== Rowing ==
An outstanding rower, he was one of the six Nagambie oarsmen that represented Victoria in the 1934 King's Cup in Hobart. He also represented Victoria in the 1935 King's Cup in Sydney.

== Football ==
=== Nagambie (WNEA) ===
He played for several seasons for the Nagambie Football Club in the Waranga-North-Eastern Association.

=== Essendon (VFL) ===
On 1 May 1936 he was granted a clearance from Nagambie to Essendon. He was a regular member of the Seconds; and played nine senior games in 1936 (his first was against South Melbourne on 30 May 1936), ten senior games in 1937, one senior game in 1938 (his last was against Collingwood on 30 April 1938), and was part of the Essendon Seconds team that were defeated by a single point by a combined Mildura District Football League team, at Mildura on 24 September 1938.

=== Coburg (VFA) ===
Omitted from Essendon's senior list in April 1939, he was cleared from Essendon to Coburg.

== Military service ==
Having enlisting in the Second AIF in July 1940, he served in the Middle East and in New Guinea during World War II.

== Death ==
He died at Heathcote Health, Heathcote, Victoria, on 17 October 2002.
