= Nick Welch =

Nick or Nicholas Walsh may refer to:

- Nick Welch (basketball) (born 1983), American basketball player
- Nick Welch (British Army officer) (born c. 1964)
- Nick Welch (cricketer) (born 1998), Zimbabwean cricketer
