= Archibald Welch =

American politician (1794–1853)

Personal details
- Born: March 13, 1794 Mansfield, Connecticut, U.S.
- Died: May 6, 1853 (aged 59) Norwalk, Connecticut, U.S.
- Party: Whig
- Spouse: Cynthia Hyde
- Children: Henry Kirke White Welch
- Education: Yale College (MD)
- Occupation: Politician; physician

Archibald Welch (March 13, 1794 – May 6, 1853) was an American politician and medical doctor from Connecticut.

== Early life ==
Archibald Welch was born on March 13, 1794, in Mansfield, Connecticut, to Moses Cook Welch. His father was a pastor in North Mansfield. His great-great-grandfather James Welch was a Massachusetts soldier in King Philip's War. He attended public schools and attended two medical lectures at Yale College. He received his license to practice in 1816. He did not receive his Doctor of Medicine from Yale until 1836 when he received it "out of course".

== Career ==
After receiving his license, Welch practiced medicine in Mansfield from 1816 to December 1832 when he moved his practice to Wethersfield. He practiced there until 1848. He then practiced medicine in Hartford from 1841 to his death. He was in charge of the medical department of the Connecticut State Prison for 10 years. He was secretary, vice president, and president of the Connecticut Medical Society. He lectured on temperance and was abstinent.

Welch was a Whig. He served in the Connecticut General Assembly.

== Personal life ==
Welch married Cynthia Hyde, daughter of Mary and Daniel Hyde, of Tolland County. His son was politician Henry Kirke White Welch. In 1841, he joined the Congregational Church at Wethersfield.

Welch died in the Norwalk rail accident on May 6, 1853. He was traveling with other physicians from a meeting of the American Medical Association in New York.
