= Manhattan Heights (El Paso, Texas neighborhood) =

- Manhattan Heights Historic District
- U.S. National Register of Historic Places
- U.S. Historic district
- Location: Roughly bounded by Grant, Louisiana and Richmond Aves., El Paso, Texas
- Area: 191 acres (77 ha)
- Built: 1914
- Architectural style: Prairie School, Bungalow/Craftsman, Spanish Colonial Revival
- NRHP reference No.: 80004107
- Added to NRHP: September 27, 1980

Manhattan Heights (also known as Memorial Park) is a historic district and neighborhood in El Paso, Texas. The neighborhood was added to the National Register of Historic Places in 1980.

== History ==
The Federal Copper Company operated a smelter in the area that would later become Manhattan Heights between June 9, 1899 and December 1, 1908. The smelter was designed by architects, Buchanan and Allen, and ore processing began on September 10, 1901. The copper company's smelter was demolished by 1912 to make way for a residential area. On October 12, 1912, the area was sold to a dentist, Dr. James B. Brady for $85,000. The first home was built in 1914, and most homes were completed by the 1930s. The homes were designed with wealthy buyers in mind.

In 1976, residents formed the Memorial Park Improvement Association (MPIA), to help restore the neighborhood. Kenneth Bailey, Una Hill, Mary Wilson, Louis Cantwell, Mary Neil Brown and Sandra Davis were all involved with getting Manhattan Heights designated a historic neighborhood on June 9, 1979. It was the first neighborhood in El Paso to receive that distinction. Because of the historic status of the neighborhood, efforts to preserve old homes have been undertaken by the El Paso Historic Preservation Alliance.

== Cityscape ==
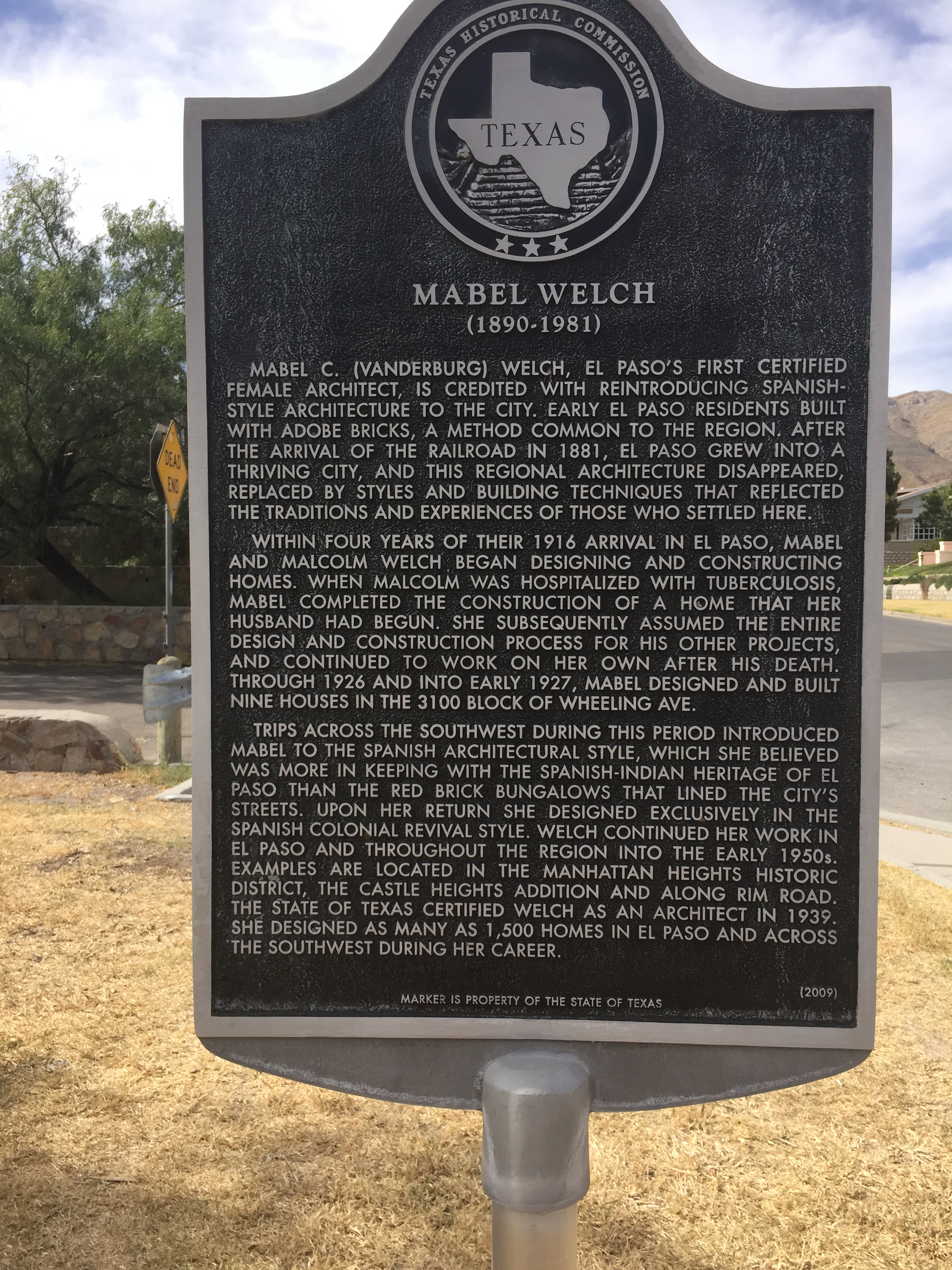
Mabel Welch Historic Marker at Memorial Park, El Paso, TX

The boundaries of Manhattan Heights are made up by Memorial Park, Piedras Road, Copia Street and Louisville.

Architecture in Manhattan Heights includes buildings that represent Georgian Revival, Foursquare, Tudor, American bungalows and Spanish-Italian architectural influences. In 1927, the first woman architect in El Paso and second in Texas, Mabel C. Welch, built her first home in the Manhattan Heights neighborhood. Welch started the trend of Spanish revival in the area.

== Education ==
Manhattan Heights School, later renamed Crockett Elementary School, was established in 1919. The name change took place in order to honor heroes from Texas and happened on May 8, 1922.

The area is served by the Memorial Park Branch of the El Paso Public Library system.

== Parks and recreation ==
Veterans Memorial Park was set aside by the city of El Paso on May 13, 1920. The park is a war memorial and "desert oasis" designed primarily by landscape architect, George Kessler.

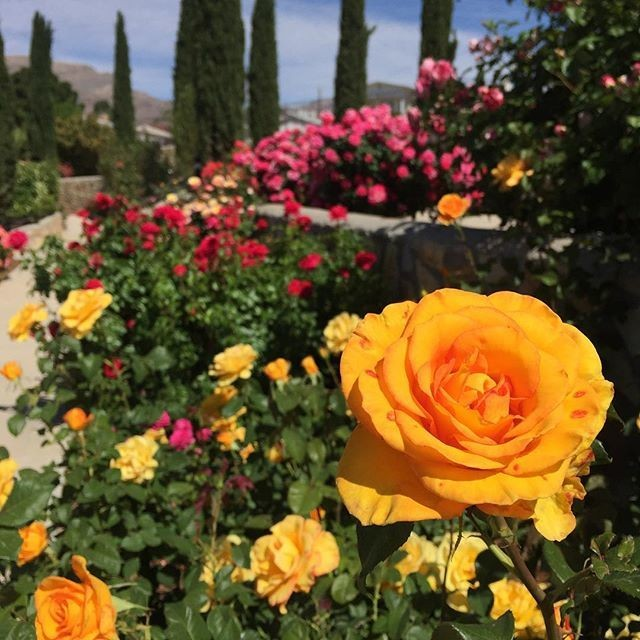
Roses in the El Paso Municipal Rose Garden.

Another park in the area is the Municipal Rose Garden, which was opened in May 1959. The rose garden showcases over 430 varieties of roses and 1,500 individual rose buses. The roses growing in the garden are representative of types that grow best in El Paso's desert climate. The garden is about 4-acres in size. The garden has been maintained by El Paso Master Gardeners since 2007, who work as volunteers. The garden is multi-level and also includes waterfalls and a koi pond. The garden is open seasonally, from the beginning of March until the end of November. It is located on North Copia street and has free admission. Prior to the Rose garden, there were several different gardens on the site which were known as the Hill Top Gardens Area and opened in 1933. The rock wall seats of the garden were part of a Civil Works Administration project and the gardens were completed by 1935. The Hill Top Gardens won a Better Homes and Gardens contest in 1938.

== Culture ==
=== Religion ===
St. Alban's Episcopal church, a mission of the first Protestant church in El Paso, Church of St. Clement, was dedicated on December 11, 1921.

== Notable residents ==
- Veronica Escobar
- Fred Hervey
