= Edward Welch =

Edward Welch may refer to:

- Edward Welch (architect), Welsh architect
- Edward F. Welch Jr., United States Navy admiral
- Edward Welch (pirate), Madagascar-based pirate trader
- Ed Welch, English composer
- Edward Welch House, Boise, Idaho
