= Welchs, Virginia =

Unincorporated community in Virginia, United States

Coordinates: 38°05′26″N 77°29′08″W

Welchs is an unincorporated community in Caroline County, in the U.S. state of Virginia.
