= Walshe =

Origin
- Origin: Wales
- Meaning: "Wales"
- Region of origin: Ireland

Other names
- Variant forms: "Walsh", "Welsh"

Walshe is a surname, a variant of Walsh, meaning "Wales", i.e. "foreigner" (non-English) originating in Wales, brought to Ireland by Normans. It is most common in County Mayo and County Kilkenny. There are other variants including "Welsh". Walshe is uncommon as a given name.

== Notable people with this name ==
- Ana Walshe (died 2023), Serbian-American murder victim
- Damian Walshe-Howling
- Dylan Walshe
- Francis Walshe
- Gwenethe Walshe
- James Walshe (1803–1888), catholic priest and Bishop in Kildare and Leighlin
- Jennifer Walshe
- Joe Walshe
- John Walshe (disambiguation)
- Joseph Walshe, (1886–1956), Irish civil servant
- Nick Walshe (born 1974), former rugby union footballer
- Pat Walshe

== See also ==
- Walsh (disambiguation)
- Walsh (surname)
- Welsh (surname)
