= George Welsh (Australian footballer) =

Australian rules footballer

Personal information
- Full name: George Maldon Welsh
- Born: 3 October 1896; Maldon, Victoria
- Died: 16 September 1983 (aged 86); Cooma, New South Wales
- Height: 164 cm (5 ft 5 in)

Playing career^{1}
Years	Club	Games (Goals)
1921	Fitzroy	7 (2)
- ^{1} Playing statistics correct to the end of 1921.

George Maldon Welsh (3 October 1896 – 16 September 1983) was an Australian rules footballer who played with Fitzroy in the Victorian Football League (VFL).
