= Harry Welch =

Harry Welch may refer to:

- Harry Welch (American football) (born 1945), American high school football coach
- Harry Foster Welch (1893–1973), American radio and voice actor
