= Cancer and Metastasis Reviews =

Medical journal

- Discipline: Oncology
- Language: English
- Edited by: Kenneth V. Honn, Avraham Raz

Publication details
- History: 1982–present
- Publisher: Springer Science+Business Media
- Frequency: Quarterly
- Impact factor: 9.264 (2020)

Standard abbreviations
- ISO 4: Cancer Metastasis Rev.

Indexing
- CODEN: CMRED4
- ISSN: 0167-7659 (print); 1573-7233 (web)
- LCCN: 2006242045
- OCLC no.: 890302992

Links
- Journal homepage; Online archive

Cancer and Metastasis Reviews is a quarterly peer-reviewed medical review journal covering oncology and the development of new cancer treatments. It was established in 1982 and is published by Springer Science+Business Media. The editors-in-chief are Kenneth V. Honn (Wayne State University School of Medicine) and Avraham Raz (Barbara Ann Karmanos Cancer Institute). According to the Journal Citation Reports, the journal has a 2020 impact factor of 9.264.
