= James Welch =

James Welch may refer to:

- James Welch (actor) (1865–1917), English actor
- James Welch (VC) (1889–1978), English recipient of the Victoria Cross
- Jim Welch (1938–2017), former American football player
- James Welch (writer) (1940–2003), Native American author and poet
- James T. Welch (born 1975), member of the Massachusetts House of Representatives

== See also ==
- James Welsh (disambiguation)
