= Mabel C. Welch =

American architect

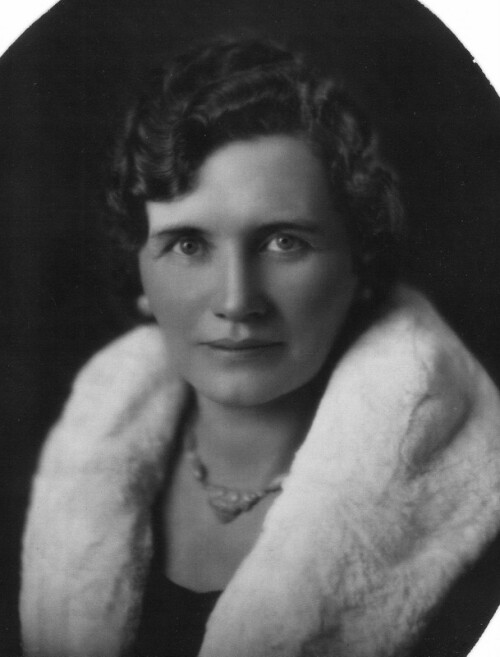
Mabel Welch in 1920

Mabel Clair Vandenburg Welch (November 8, 1890 – December 3, 1981) was an American architect. She was the first woman to work as a professional architect in El Paso, Texas.

== Biography ==
Mabel Clair Vandenburg was born in Panola County, Mississippi on November 8. 1890. She grew up on her grandfather's plantation until the family moved to Northeast Texas in 1899.

Welch and her husband, who had tuberculosis, came to El Paso for the climate in 1916. She learned the construction business from her husband and after his death in July 1927, took over the company. By 1939, she was a member of the Society of American Registered Architects. Welch was the first certified woman architect in El Paso. She continued to build new houses until 1952, after which she remodeled older homes.

Welch's designs were based on traditional Spanish colonial architecture and she also advocated for using native plants for landscaping. Welch was committed to beautifying El Paso. Welch designed over 1,000 homes in El Paso by 1950. Some of her most famous homes are located on Rim Road, including the J.W. Peak Mansion, the A. B. Poe House, and the Robert F. Thompson House. She also designed buildings in Chihuahua City, Ciudad Juárez, Dallas, Deming, Fabens, Las Cruces, and Marfa.

Welch had a stroke in November 1981 and left El Paso to live closer to family. She died in a nursing home in Redondo Beach, California on December 3, 1981.

== See also ==
- Manhattan Heights (El Paso, Texas neighborhood)
