= Henry Kirke White Welch =

American politician (1821–1870)

Member of the Connecticut House of Representatives
- In office 1864–1865

Member of the Connecticut Senate from the 1st district
- In office 1862–1863

Personal details
- Born: January 1, 1821 Mansfield, Connecticut, U.S.
- Died: November 25, 1870 (aged 49) Hartford, Connecticut, U.S.
- Resting place: Spring Grove Cemetery
- Party: Republican; Whig
- Spouse(s): Frances Louisa Goodrich (m. 1852; died 1855) Susan Leavitt Goodwin (m. 1858)
- Children: 5
- Parent: Archibald Welch (father)
- Education: Yale College (LLB)
- Occupation: Politician; lawyer; educator

Henry Kirke White Welch (January 1, 1821 – November 25, 1870) was an American lawyer and politician from Connecticut.

== Early life and career ==
Henry Kirke White Welch was born on January 1, 1821, in Mansfield, Connecticut, as the oldest child of Cynthia (née Hyde) and Archibald Welch. His father was a physician and died in the Norwalk rail accident. Welch graduated from Yale College in 1842.

Welch taught in Brooklyn, Connecticut, from October 1842 to March 1843. He had a throat ailment that caused him to stay with his father in Wethersfield for a few months and then he went to Georgia for his health. He returned in 1844 briefly, but still having issues with his throat, he returned to the South and taught in Montgomery, Alabama, for two years. He studied law alongside teaching. In the winter of 1846 to 1847, he read law in Brooklyn, Connecticut, with his uncle Jonathan A. Welch. He then attended Yale Law School for two years and graduated with a Bachelor of Laws. He was admitted to the bar in March 1850.

== Career ==
In June 1850, Welch opened a law office in Hartford. In 1854, he formed a law practice with N. Shipman. He practiced law there until his death.

Welch was a Republican and later became affiliated with the Whig Party. He served in the Connecticut Senate, representing the 1st district, in 1862. He was chairman of the committee on finance. He served in the Connecticut House of Representatives from 1864 to 1865. In 1864, he served again as chairman of the house's finance committee. In 1865, he served as chairman of the judiciary committee. He was a member of the board of police commissioners.

== Personal life ==
Welch married Frances Louisa, youngest daughter of Chauncey A. Goodrich, on March 24, 1852. She died in 1855. He married Susan Leavitt Goodwin, daughter of Eliza Amy (née Sheldon) and Edward Goodwin, of Hartford on October 5, 1858. They had four sons and a daughter, Archibald Ashley, Edward G., Frances G., Henry Kirke White, and Lewis S. His second wife's first cousin was George Goodwin Jr. He was a member of the Pearl Street Congregational Church.

Welch died on November 25, 1870, at his home in Hartford. He was buried in Spring Grove Cemetery.
