= Early resistance to British rule in Malabar =

The British got Malabar from Tippu Sultan in 1792. But Malabar was a province that was plagued by rebellion, unrest and insurgency as early as 1766—when Hyder Ali occupied the whole of Malabar. Two decades of Mysore effort to subjugate this province ended up in chaos and confusion in Malabar with a part of her population either dead or migrated and once prosperous economy destroyed.

Those local potentates who fought alongside the British in warfare with Tippu were unhappy that the British wanted Rajahs to accept British suzerainty and pay tributes along with British interference in domestic affairs. Though they signed treaties in 1792 that accepted British demands, soon many would rise in revolt and plunge the country once more into a state of chaos and warfare that characterised the province since 1766

== Causes ==
British policy at first was to reinstall the old Rajahs who fled to Travancore when Hyder Ali invaded Malabar. But British interference with ancient order that curtailed traditional powers of local potentates—many who had helped the British in war with Tippu—along with high levels of tax collection rates from the peasantry meant that a large section of the populace became discontent and chose to revolt.

== Duration ==
The province of Malabar was in a state of disorder since 1792 when the British acquired control of Malabar, and this continued till 1806, when they hunted down the last of the Pazhassi Raja's partisans.

This period of disturbance can be divided into two sub-periods:

1. 1792 – 1798: During this period, low-intensity resistance to British rule was widespread in Malabar; British troops skirmished with local malcontents. But during this time, the only leader to wage full-blown warfare was Kerala Varma Pazhassi Raja of Kottayam.
2. 1799 – 1806: During this period, the Pazhassi Raja, supported secretly by malcontents in Malabar, renewed his war with the British. The Mappilas of Southern Malabar caused a state of disturbance from 1800 to 1802.

== Major resistance movements ==
From 1792 until 1798, Pazhassi Rajah of Kottayam, Ravi Varma and nephews [Calicut princes of Padinjare Kovilakam] and [Kunhu Achan Crown Prince of Palghat] along with Mappila chieftain Unni Mootha Muppan and some Gouda Polygars of Coimbatore.

From 1799 until 1806, Pazhassi Rajah confronted the British in North Malabar in the Cotiote Wars almost alone, as the rest of the princes and chieftains had by that time come to terms with the British. But a trio of Mappila chieftains—Chemban Poker, Manjeri Athan Gurikkal, and Unni Mootha Muppan rose in revolt in South Malabar.

These turbulent figures forced the British authorities to deploy a large army of 10,000 to 15,000 men. Heavy losses of men are reported on both camps – with the British losing 4,000 men in their first war with Pazhassi Rajah alone. The forest-clad hills and mountains that covered most of Malabar proved to be useful to rebels who waged guerrilla warfare to harass British regiments.

== Rising of 1803 ==
British revenue policy provoked an uprising in early 1803 that was complete and wholesale in Malabar. The British immediately reverted to older revenue assessments and persuaded the furious province to calm down by June 1803. British met most of the Rajahs and nobles who had not joined the Pazhassi rebellion and successfully made them agree that they [Rajahs and nobles] would talk to the people to end the revolt and return home. This was a spontaneous uprising and the severest revolt the British faced in Malabar from 1792 till 1947.

=== End of resistance ===
The British, who were worried that they would have to face a 25-year revolt like the Mysore rulers, moved with more caution and wisdom. They persuaded Rajahs towards whom people had absolute loyalty to let the British annex their kingdoms in return for 20 per cent of revenue collection as a pension. The annexation of Malabar was done in stages from 1800 to 1807.

It is true that the British suppressed rebels like Pazhassi Rajah and his followers along with the Mappila rebels of South Malabar – but that was possible only because the British could come to an understanding with the rest of the Rajahs and nobles – which meant that die-hard rebels like those mentioned above had to face the fury of British might alone.

=== Fate of the rebels ===
Rebels were hanged, imprisoned or pardoned. Ravi Varma and his nephews died in British custody in 1793. Unni Mootha Muppan, who joined Pazhassi Rajah's army, was killed in 1802. Pazhassi Rajah himself died in war, or perhaps by suicide, in 1805. Nephews of Pazhassi Rajah, Vira Varma and Ravi Varma, were arrested but pardoned. The Calicut prince Manavikraman, who sheltered the nephews of Pazhassi Rajah, was arrested, and he committed suicide in Dindigul Jail in 1806.

== Kurichia Revolt of 1812 ==
Due to the revenue policy of the British, Kurichia tribesmen of Wayanad, who had earlier fought under Pazhassi Rajah, rose in revolt. But it was suppressed within months. The leader of the revolt hoped to renew war with the British and to put Vira Varma, nephew of Pazhassi Rajah, as the head of the rebellion.

== Conspiracy of 1812 ==
The Travancore prime minister Iravi Tamby plotted with Vira Varma, nephew of Pazhassi Rajah, to launch a rebellion across Kerala to oust the British. But the conspiracy was uncovered, and its leaders were either shot or jailed. Vira Varma was deported to Madras but was once more pardoned in 1815.
