= David E. Welch =

American politician

David E. Welch was an American politician. He was a Republican member of the Wisconsin State Assembly and the Wisconsin State Senate.

== Biography ==
Welch was born on December 4, 1835, in Milton Township, Wayne County, Ohio. Following the outbreak of the American Civil War, he enlisted with the 2nd Ohio Cavalry of the Union Army and would reach the rank of lieutenant colonel. He was later a member of the Army of the Tennessee and, after re-enlistment, the Army of the Potomac and the Cavalry Bureau. Welch later became a farmer in Delton, Wisconsin.

== Political career ==
Welch was a member of the Assembly during the 1874 and 1875 sessions. Afterwards, he represented the 14th District of the Senate during the 1876, 1877, 1878 and 1879 sessions. Other positions Welch held include Postmaster of Westfield Township, Medina County, Ohio, in 1861.

In January 1900, Welch was appointed cashier in the office of the Sergeant-at-arms of the United States House of Representatives, Henry Casson.
