= Mabel Rose Welch =

American painter

Mabel Rose Welch (March 26, 1871 – January 1, 1959) was an American painter of portrait miniatures.

== Early life ==
Born in New Haven, Connecticut, Welch was the daughter of Dr. Follansbee Goodrich Welch Jr. and Rosa Phillips (Merrill) Welch. She studied under Kenyon Cox and Robert Reid at the Art Students League of New York. She moved to Paris for further study, showing her work at the Paris Salon. She returned to the United States and was active in New York City for some while.

== Art career ==
During her career she served as the secretary of the American Society of Miniature Painters, from whom she was once the recipient of the Levantia White Boardman Memorial Medal; she was also a member of the Pennsylvania Society of Miniature Painters, the Woman's Art Club, and the Art Workers' Club. Among her other awards were a silver medal from the Panama–Pacific International Exposition in 1915; the Medal of Honor of the Pennsylvania Society of Miniature Painters in 1920; a medal from the Brooklyn Society of Miniature Painters in 1933; and awards from the National Association of Women Painters and Sculptors (the Lindsey Morris Sterling Prize for Miniatures) and the California Society of Miniature Painters in 1937.

Welch died in Wilbraham, Massachusetts, and is buried there in the Woodland Dell Cemetery.

== Collections ==
A portrait by Welch of Rosina Cox Boardman, in watercolor on ivory and dating to around 1940, is currently owned by the Smithsonian American Art Museum. The Metropolitan Museum of Art owns two miniature portraits in the same medium, a Portrait of a Lady from the first half of the 1910s and a portrait of Mrs. S. Keith Evans from around 1911.
