= Myra Brooks Welch =

American poet

Myra Brooks Welch (October 12, 1877 – August 11, 1959 Los Angeles, California) was a poet that is known for her Christian poem The Touch of the Master's Hand, which was also adapted into a film.

== Personal life ==
Myra Brooks was born on October 12, 1877, in Farmington Township, Fulton County, Illinois to Mary (née Eshelman) and John W. Brooks. She was the youngest of four other siblings: Charles, David, Frank and Dessie. By 1900, she and her parents had relocated to Independence, Oregon, where she was working as a sales clerk in a store. Around 1901, she married Otis Melvin Welch, who was a clerk in a dry goods store and had two children, Otis and Doris. By 1920, her parents had moved with her and her family and they were all living in La Verne, California.

Welch's most noted poem, The Touch of the Master's Hand was written in 1921 and published on February 26, 1921, in the Gospel Messenger. She published four books of poetry The Years Between (1929), Dorcas (1930), High Songs (1933) and The Touch of the Master's Hand (1941). Welch was disabled in a wheelchair from arthritis. Her arthritis later caused her to not be able to play music, such as the organ which she used to play. Her hands were disabled, but she wrote poems on a typewriter by pressing the keys with pencil erasers, despite the pain that it caused. She was named "the poet with the singing soul".
