= Lewis Welch =

American politician

Member of the Michigan Senate from the 9th district
- In office January 1, 1857 – December 31, 1860
- Preceded by: Henry M. Boies
- Succeeded by: Samuel Mulholland

Personal details
- Born: January 1814 New York, US
- Died: November 15, 1878 (aged 64) Exeter Township, Michigan, US
- Party: Republican
- Spouse: Lois Katherine Palmer
- Children: 4

Lewis Welch (January 1814 – November 15, 1878) was a Michigan politician.

== Early life ==
Welch was born in January 1814 in New York.

== Career ==
Welch served as supervisor of Exeter Township, Michigan from 1845 to 1849. On November 4, 1856, Welch was elected to the Michigan Senate where he represented the 9th district from January 7, 1857 to December 31, 1860. In both 1856 and 1858, Welch was elected as a Republican.

== Personal life ==
On January 3, 1836, Welch married Lois Katherine Palmer. Together, they had four children. Welch was Methodist Episcopal.

== Death ==
Welch died in Exeter Township on November 15, 1878. At the time of his death, he had lived in Exeter Township for over 40 years. He was interred at McIntyre Cemetery in Monroe, Michigan on November 17, 1878.
