= Welsch =

Welsch may refer to:

- Georg Hieronymus Welsch (1624–1677), German physician
- Gottfried Welsch (1618–1690), German physician
- Heinrich Welsch (1888–1976), German politician
- Henry Welsch (1921–1996), American football and baseball player and coach
- Howard Welsch (1898–1980), American film producer
- Jiří Welsch (born 1980), Czech basketball player
- Johannes Welsch (born 1960), German percussionist
- Kurt Welsch (1917–1981), German footballer
- Maximilian von Welsch (1671–1745), German architect
- Roger Welsch (1936–2022), American author
- Samuel J. Welsch (1902–1990), American politician
- Wolfgang Welsch (born 1946), German philosopher

== See also ==
- Welsh (surname)
