= Ron Welch =

United States Army general

Ronald P. Welch
- Born: January 9, 1960 (age 66); New London, Connecticut
- Military career
- Allegiance: State of Connecticut
- Branch: United States Army
- Service years: 1978–2017
- Rank: Brigadier general
- Commands: 85th Troop Command; 14th Civil Support Team; 1st OCS Battalion, 169th Leadership Regiment; HHC, 1st Battalion, 169th Infantry Regiment, 43rd Infantry Brigade, 26th Infantry Division
- Conflicts: Operation Enduring Freedom
- Awards: https://en.wikipedia.org/wiki/Legion_of_Merit Soldier's Medal; Bronze Star

Brigadier General (Ret.) Ronald Paul Welch (born January 9, 1960) was an American Military officer and the former Director of the Joint Staff of the Connecticut National Guard. He began his military service in 1978 when he enlisted in United States Army and served as an NCO in 2nd Bn (Ranger) 75th Infantry. He was later commissioned, through Connecticut Military Academy in August 1984 through the Officer Candidate School.

== Education ==
1985: Mohegan Community College, Associate in Science, Norwich, CT

1992: Eastern Connecticut State University, Bachelor of General Studies, Willimantic, CT

2007: Eastern Connecticut State University, Master of Science in Organizational Management, Willimantic, CT

2011: U.S. Army War College, Master of Strategic Studies

== Military career ==
=== United States Army ===
Ron Welch enlisted in the United States Army in on October 3, 1978, where he served on active duty with the 2nd Ranger Battalion of the 75th Ranger Regiment at Fort Lewis, Washington. During his active duty service he attained the rank of sergeant and completed Basic Airborne School, Ranger School, Jungle Warfare Course, USMC Amphibious Recon Scout Swimmer Course, Jumpmaster Course, Primary Non Commission Officer Course, USMC Scout Sniper Course, Emergency Medical Technician Course, Special Operations and Tactics Course, and the Pathfinder School. On May 4, 1981, he sustained serious injuries during an in-line of duty parachute accident. He left active service on October 2, 1982.

=== Connecticut National Guard ===
After leaving active service, Welch joined the Connecticut National Guard, where he attended Officer Candidate School in 1983. On August 11, 1984, he was commissioned as a second lieutenant in the infantry. He then served in numerous positions in the Connecticut National Guard's Infantry units as a rifle platoon leader, company commander and various staff positions. He also served as an operations officer in a Combat Engineer battalion. While as a member of the National Guard, Welch graduated from The Infantry Officer Basic Course, Master Fitness Trainer Course, Air Assault Course, Infantry Officers Advanced Courses, NBC Officer/NCO Defense Course, Rappel Master Course, Combined Arms Service Staff School, Command and General Staff College, Israeli Defense Force Airborne Center, the US Army War College, Army Combat Lifesaver Course, Joint Task Force Commander Training Course, Dual Status Commander Orientation Course, Leadership in Homeland Security Course, Advanced Joint Professional Military Education, the General & Flag Officer Homeland Security Executive Seminar.

=== Operation Enduring Freedom ===
Welch deployed to Afghanistan from 2005 to 2006 as a senior American advisor to an Afghan National Army, Infantry Brigade located in Eastern Afghanistan, providing training, advice and conducting combat operations. While in Afghanistan, he continued to advise units of the Connecticut National Guard in preparing them for their deployments to Afghanistan. His main advice was to learn the culture, the language and customs while continuing traditional military skills such as physical fitness and marksmanship.

=== Soldier’s Medal ===
On December 11, 1992, during an intense winter storm, a dispatcher from the Fairfield, Connecticut, fire department called the Stratford Armory for assistance evacuating residents. Then Captain Welch and four others, Sergeants First Class Roger G. Barr, Douglas E. Bell, Raymond C. Spry and Specialist Chi Tranh Chong, drove to the scene in a canvas-covered military truck. They rescued 34 personnel, including a 94-year-old woman and students from nearby Fairfield University. The soldiers had to evacuate the vehicles, wade through chest-high water of 42 degrees and carry the victims to the truck. While attempting to leave the flooded area, the truck stalled in the rising flood waters. The team was able to secure some small boats drifting in the water and used them to hand tow the victims to a waiting fire boat. Others were brought to a small dry piece of land, where they were eventually rescued by helicopter.

== Assignments ==
- August 1984 – May 1985, rifle platoon leader Company B, 1st Battalion, 169th Infantry, 43rd Infantry Brigade, 26th Infantry Division, Manchester, Connecticut
- May 1985 – March 1987, company executive officer, Headquarters Company, 1st Battalion, 169th Infantry, 43rd Infantry Brigade, 26th Infantry Division, Manchester, Connecticut
- March 1987 – April 1988, battalion tactical intelligence officer, (BICC), 1st Battalion, 169th Infantry, 43rd Infantry Brigade, 26th Infantry Division, Manchester, Connecticut
- April 1988 – November 1988, battalion S-3 (Air), 1st Battalion, 169th Infantry, 43rd Infantry Brigade, 26th Infantry Division, Manchester, Connecticut
- November 1988 – November 1989, company commander, Headquarters, 1st Battalion, 169th Infantry, 43rd Infantry Brigade, 26th Infantry Division, Manchester, Connecticut
- November 1989 – June 1990, battalion S-2, 1st Battalion, 169th Infantry, 43rd Infantry Brigade, 26th Infantry Division, Manchester, Connecticut
- June 1990 – July 1990, battalion S-1, 143rd Forward Support Battalion, 43rd Infantry Brigade, 26th Infantry Division, Waterbury, Connecticut
- July 1990 – February 1991, battalion S-2, 2nd Battalion, 102nd Infantry, 43rd Infantry Brigade, 26th Infantry Division, Meriden, Connecticut
- February 1991 – March 1992, battalion S-1, 2nd Battalion, 102nd Infantry, 43rd Infantry Brigade, 26th Infantry Division, Meriden, Connecticut
- March 1992 – January 1993, battalion operations officer, Headquarters Company, 242nd Combat Engineer Battalion, Connecticut Army National Guard, Stratford, Connecticut
- January 1993 – April 1995, battalion assistant S-3, Headquarters Company, 242nd Combat Engineer Battalion, Connecticut Army National Guard, Stratford, Connecticut
- April 1995 – August 1995, instructor, Connecticut Military Academy, Connecticut Army National Guard, Niantic, Connecticut
- August 1995 – January 1996, senior instructor, Connecticut Military Academy, Connecticut Army National Guard Niantic, Connecticut
- January 1996 – February 1997, executive officer/operations officer, Northeast Leadership Training Brigade, Connecticut Army National Guard, Niantic, Connecticut
- February 1997 – October 1998, operations officer, Headquarters, 169th Leadership Regiment, Connecticut Army National Guard, Niantic, Connecticut
- October 1998 – August 1999, brigade S-3, Headquarters, 85th Troop Command, State Area Command, New London, Connecticut
- August 1999 – January 2000, brigade S-1, Headquarters, 85th Troop Command, State Area Command, New London, Connecticut
- January 2000 – August 2000, commander, 1st OCS Battalion, Headquarters, 169th Leadership Regiment, Connecticut Army National Guard, Niantic, Connecticut
- August 2000 – November 2003, brigade S-3, Headquarters, 85th Troop Command, State Area Command, New London, Connecticut
- November 2003 – March 2004, commander 14th Civil Support Team, Connecticut National Guard, Hartford, Connecticut
- March 2004 – May 2005, J5/director of Military Support, Connecticut National Guard, Hartford, Connecticut
- May 2005 – June 2005, brigade advisory team leader (ETT), FT Carson, Colorado
- June 2005 – June 2006, brigade advisory team leader (ETT), CJTF Phoenix, Afghanistan
- June 2006 – March 2007, J5/director of military support, Joint Force Headquarters – CT, Connecticut National Guard, Hartford, Connecticut
- April 2007 – June 2008, J3/director of operations, Joint Force Headquarters – CT, Connecticut National Guard, Hartford, Connecticut
- July 2008 – May 2010, chief of staff, Joint Force Headquarters – CT, Connecticut National Guard, Hartford, Connecticut
- May 2010 – August 2012, commander, 85th Troop Command, Connecticut Army National Guard, Niantic, Connecticut
- August 2012 – February 2014, chief of staff, Joint Force Headquarters – CT, Connecticut National Guard, Hartford, Connecticut
- February 2014 – present, director, Joint Staff, Joint Force Headquarters – CT, Connecticut National Guard, Hartford, Connecticut

== Awards and decorations ==
Combat Infantry Badge

Expert Infantry Badge

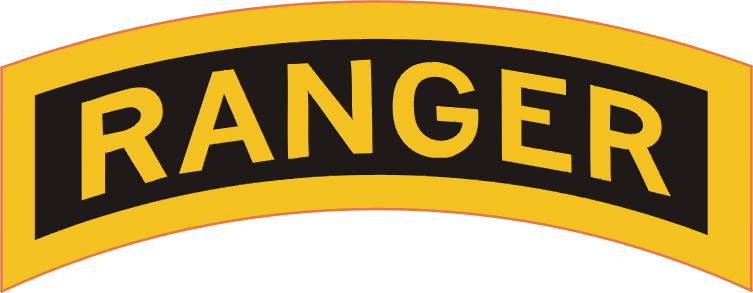
Ranger Tab

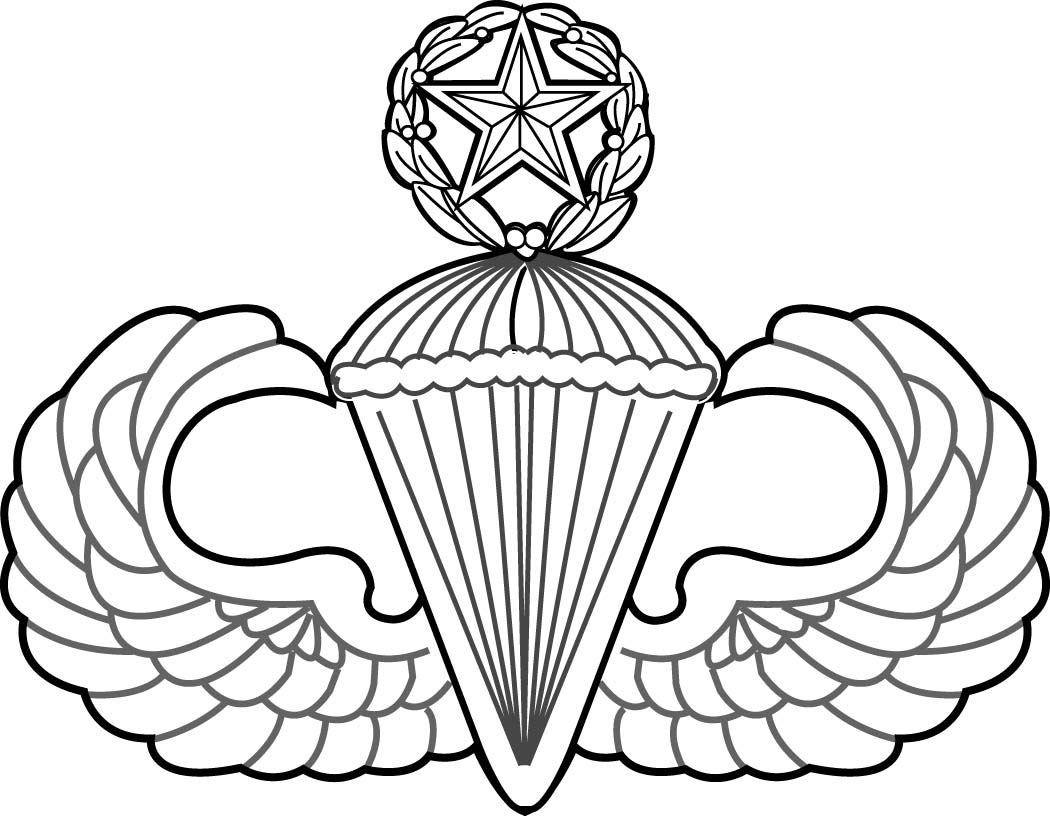
Master Parachutist Badge

Pathfinder Badge

Air Assault Badge

Soldier's Medal
Bronze Star Medal
Meritorious Service Medal with three bronze oak leaf clusters
Army Commendation Medal with one silver oak leaf cluster and three bronze oak leaf clusters
Army Achievement Medal
Army Good Conduct Medal
Army Reserve Component Achievement Medal with one silver oak leaf cluster and 1 bronze oak leaf cluster
National Defense Service Medal with bronze service star
Afghanistan Campaign Medal with one service star
Global War on Terrorism Service Medal
Armed Forces Reserve Medal with Gold Hourglass and M Device
Non-Commissioned Officer Professional Development Ribbon
Army Service Ribbon
Overseas Service Ribbon
Army Reserve Components Overseas Training Ribbon with numeral 2

== Effective dates of promotion ==
Promotions
Insignia	Rank	Date
	Brigadier General	July 31, 2015
	Colonel	October 1, 2004
	Lieutenant Colonel	August 29, 2000
	Major	August 3, 1995
	Captain	February 24, 1990
	First Lieutenant	August 10, 1987
	Second Lieutenant	August 11, 1984
