= Micky Welch =

Barbadian-English footballer

Personal information
- Full name: Michael Welch
- Date of birth: 21 May 1957
- Place of birth: Barbados
- Date of death: 7 February 2022 (aged 64)
- Positions: Central defender; striker

Senior career*
| Years | Team | Apps | (Gls) |
| 1983–1984 | Grays Athletic | | |
| 1984 | Wimbledon | 4 | (0) |
| 1984–1985 | Grays Athletic | | |
| 1985 | Southend United | 4 | (0) |
| 1985–1988 | Grays Athletic | | |
| 1989 | Chelmsford City | 0 | (0) |
| 1989–1992 | Tooting & Mitcham United | 57 | (15) |
| 1992–1993 | Dorking | | |
| 1993–1995 | Yeading | 56 | (15) |
- * Club domestic league appearances and goals

Michael Welch (21 May 1957 — 7 February 2022) was a Barbadian professional footballer who played as a defender and a striker.

== Career ==
Welch joined Wimbledon in November 1984 from non-League side Grays Athletic, playing in four Football League games before returning to Grays. In 1985, he joined Southend United from Grays. He played in five games for Southend United between February and July, when he rejoined Grays.

== Personal life ==
Welch died in February 2022.
