= Wall (surname) =

Wall is a predominantly English surname. Notable people with the surname include:

- Alfred Wall (composer) (1875–1936), British violinist and composer
- Alfred M. Wall (1889–1957), British trade unionist and political activist
- Anita Wall (born 1940), Swedish actress
- Annie Russell Wall (1859–1942), American author
- Anthony Wall (golfer) (born 1975), English golfer
- Anthony Wall (filmmaker) (born 1951), English documentary film maker
- Anthony Wall (RAF officer) (1888–1989), British pilot
- Art Wall Jr. (1923–2011), American golfer
- Barbara Wall (born 1948), Australian squash player
- Brad Wall (born 1965), Canadian politician
- C. T. C. Wall (born 1936), British mathematician
- Carol Wall (c.1953–2023), Canadian labour and social justice activist
- Cheryl Wall (1948–2020), American literary critic
- Colter Wall (born 1995), Canadian singer
- Dan Wall (1953–2026), American jazz organist, pianist, and academic
- Daniel E. Wall (active since 1995), American civil servant
- Derek Wall (active since 1979), British politician
- Diana Wall (1943–2024), American environmental scientist and soil ecologist
- Donald Dines Wall (1921–2000), American mathematician
- Donne Wall (born 1967), American baseball player
- Drury Wall (1874–1953), American politician
- Ella Lillian Wall Van Leer, Women's rights activist and artist
- Erin Wall (1975–2020), Canadian operatic soprano
- Forrest Wall (born 1995), American baseball player
- Frank Wall (herpetologist) (1868–1960), Sri Lankan and Indian physician and herpetologist
- Frank Wall (American politician) (1908–1998), American politician
- Frank Wall (Australian politician) (1879–1941), Australian politician
- Frank Wall (politician) (active 1981–1991), Irish politician
- Frank Wall (steamboat engineer) (1810–1896), American engineer
- Garret D. Wall (1783–1850), American military officer and politician
- George Wall (1885–1962), English footballer
- George Wall (botanist) (1821–1894), Sri Lankan merchant, politician and scientist
- Gerard Wall (1920–1992), Kiwi (New Zealand) politician
- Jack Wall (disambiguation), several people
- James Charles Wall (1860–1943), British historian
- James S. Wall (born 1964), American religious leader
- James Walter Wall (1820–1872), American politician
- Jamie Wall (racing driver) (born 1977), British auto racing driver
- Jamie Wall (politician) (born 1971), Wisconsin politician
- Jeannie Wall (born 1969), American ski mountaineer
- Jeff Wall (born 1946), Canadian artist
- Jeff Wall (lawyer) (born 1976), American attorney and politician
- Joan Wall (1933–2023), English field hockey player and sports administrator
- John Wall (disambiguation), several people
- Joseph Wall (disambiguation), several people
- Kim Wall (disambiguation), several people
  - Kim Wall (sprinter) (born 1983), British sprinter
  - Kim Wall, British actor
  - Kim Wall (died 2017), freelancer and murder victim
- Larry Wall (born 1949), American programmer
- Lou Wall, Australian Comedian
- Lula Belle Wall (c. 1860–1924), also known as Lou Wall Moore, American sculptor, stage actress, costume designer, dancer, and socialite
- Lucille Wall (1898–1986), American actress
- Lyndsay Wall (born 1985), American ice hockey player
- Martin Dingle-Wall (born 1971), Australian actor
- Max Wall (1908–1990), English actor
- Melanie Wall (born 1971), American psychiatric biostatistician
- Mervyn Wall (1908–1997), Irish writer
- Nicholas Wall (1945–2017), English judge
- Pat Wall (1933–1990), English politician
- Patrick Wall (1916–1998), British military and politician
- Paul Wall (born 1981), American rapper
- Ricardo Wall (1694–1777), Irish-Spanish politician
- Richard Wall (21st century), Irish actor
- Robert Wall (disambiguation), several people
- Shannon J. Wall (1919–2007), American seaman and labour leader
- Sir Stephen Wall (born 1947), British diplomat
- Steve Wall (fl. 1980's -), Irish actor and musician
- Thomas Wall (active 1781), American theatre administrator
- Thomas Wall (politician) (1840 – after 1883), American politician
- Tim Wall (1904–1981), American cricketer
- Titus Wall (born 1999), American gridiron football player
- Travis Wall (born 1987), American dancer
- William Wall (disambiguation), several people

== See also ==
- Wahl (surname)
- Walls (surname)
- Walle (name)
- Wall (disambiguation)
- Wal (disambiguation)
