= Wahler =

Origin
- Language: German
- Meaning: 1. from place name "Wahl"; 2. from place name "Wahle"; 3. "Walther"; 4. variant of the surname "Wohler"
- Region of origin: Germany, Austria

Other names
- Variant forms: Wahlers Similar surnames Wähler, Waaler, Wahl (also < Walch), Waal; Wahle (also < Walch), Wahlen

Wahler is a German surname. Notable people with the surname include:

- Bernd Wahler (born 1958), German businessman
- de:Franz Wahler (born 1962), Austrian bridge engineer
- Georges Wahler (1933—2008), French sports shooter
- de:Hans Hermann Wahler (1909–1984), Hessian politician (FDP)
- Jim Wahler (born 1966), American football defensive lineman
- Marc-Olivier Wahler (born 1964), Swiss art curator, critic and historian

== See also ==
- Freie Wähler, the German Free Voters Associations
