= Wahl (surname) =

Wahl is a Norwegian and Danish surname that originates from the German wal meaning 'field'. The name may also have roots in the German word Wahl (meaning "election" or "choice") or from Yiddish, in which wahl means "from Italy". Notable people with the surname include:

- Alicja Wahl (1932–2022), Polish artist
- Anne Wahl (born 1953), Norwegian sprint canoer
- Arthur C. Wahl, American chemist
- Asbjørn Wahl (born 1951), Norwegian researcher and author
- Ballie Wahl (1920–1978), South African rugby player
- Bernt Wahl, American author, entrepreneur and mathematician
- Betty Wahl (1924–1988), American novelist and short story writer
- Bobby Wahl (born 1992), American baseball player
- Charlotte Wahl (1817–1899), Latvian philanthropist
- Charlotte Johnson Wahl (1942–2021), British artist and mother of Boris Johnson
- Chuck Wahl (born 1950), American racing driver
- Corrine Wahl (born 1954), American model and actress
- Edgar de Wahl (1867–1948), Baltic German linguist and scholar
- Eduard Wahl (1903–1985), German CDU politician
- Erik Wahl, American artist and entrepreneur
- Florian Wahl (born 1984), German politician
- François Wahl (1925–2014), French editor and structuralist
- Frank-Michael Wahl (born 1956), German handball player
- George Douglas Wahl (1895–1981), American military officer
- Grant Wahl (1974–2022), American sports journalist
- Harry Wahl (1869–1940), Finnish businessman, violin collector, and sailor
- Harry Wahl (1902–1975), Canadian political figure
- Hauke Wahl (born 1994), German footballer
- Henry Wahl, (1915–1984) Norwegian speed skater
- Jacques Wahl (born 1971), South African cricketer
- James M. Wahl (1846–1939), Norwegian American settler and South Dakota legislator
- Jan Boyer Wahl (1933–2019), American children's book author
- Jean Wahl (1888–1974), French philosopher
- Jens Wahl (born 1966), German footballer
- Johann Salomon Wahl (1689–1765), German artist
- John Eshleman Wahl (1933–2010), American civil rights attorney
- Jonathan Wahl, American mathematician
- Karl Wahl (1892–1981), German Nazi Gauleiter of Swabia
- Ken Wahl (born 1954), American film and television actor
- Kermit Wahl (1922–1987), American baseball player
- Kurt Wahl (1912–1990), German fencer
- Lutz Wahl (1869–1928), American military general
- Margit Wahl (1900 or 1903–1949), Hungarian operatic soprano singer
- Mats Wahl (1945–2025), Swedish writer and dramatist
- Meir Wahl, Polish rabbi
- Mitch Wahl (born 1990), American hockey player
- Moritz Callmann Wahl (1829–1887), German writer
- Nathalie Wahl (born 1976), Belgian mathematician
- Nicholas Wahl (1928–1996), American historian
- Otto Wahl (1904–1935), German cross-country skier
- Paul Wahl (1906–1982), German weightlifter
- Philippe Wahl (born 1956), French business executive
- Phoebe Wahl, American illustrator, sculptor and children's book author
- Rakel Wahl (1921–2005), Norwegian cross-country skier
- Richard Wahl (1906–1982), German fencer
- Richard L. Wahl, nuclear medicine physician
- Robert Wahl (1927–2023), American football player
- Rosalie E. Wahl (1924–2013), American jurist
- Saul Wahl (1541–1617), legendary king of Poland
- Tyler Wahl (born 2001), American basketball player
- Veleslav Wahl (1922–1950), Czech ornithologist and resistance activist
- Will Wahl, contestant on Survivor: Millennials vs. Gen X
- William Henry Wahl (1848–1909), American scientific editor and journalist
- Wolfgang Wahl (1925–2006), German actor

== See also ==
- Wahle
- Waal (disambiguation)
- Vahl
