= Vahl =

Vahl is a surname. Notable people with the surname include:

- Christian-Friedrich Vahl (born 1955), German cardiac surgeon
- Emanuel Vahl (born 1938), Ukrainian-Israeli composer
- Herbert-Ernst Vahl (1896–1944), German SS general
- Jens Vahl (1796–1854), Danish botanist and pharmacist, botanical authority abbreviation J.Vahl
- Martin Vahl (1749–1804), Danish-Norwegian botanist and zoologist, botanical authority abbreviation Vahl

== See also ==
- Wahl (disambiguation)
- Waal (disambiguation)
- Wael
- Wahle
- Wahlen
- Vahlen
