= Wal (given name) =

Wal is a male given name and nickname. It is the Australian diminutive for Walter, Wallace, and Wally.

People using this name include:

== Persons ==
=== Sportspeople ===
- Wally Carr (1954–2019; aka Wal Carr), Aboriginal Australian professional boxer
- Wal Fall (born 1992), German soccer player
- Wal Handley (1902–1941), British motorcycle racer
- Wal Ives (1906–1983), Australian rugby union footballer
- Wal Lambert (1916–1993), Australian rower
- Wal Mackney (1905–1975), Australian rugger and rower
- Wal Phillips (1908–1998), British motorcycle racer
- Wal Rigney (1898–1965), Australian rugby union footballer
- Wal Wallace (born 1967), pro-wrestler ring name of Pierre Carl Ouellet
- Wal Walmsley (1916–1978), Australian cricketer
- Wal Chuol (2006) High School Basketball player

==== Australian-rules football players ====
- Wal Alexander (1923–1995), Australian-rules footballer
- Wal Allan (fl. 1920s), Australian-rules footballer
- Wal Armour (1921–1995), Australian-rules footballer
- Wal Burleigh (1886–1948), Australian-rules footballer
- Wal Dudley (1918–1978), Australian-rules footballer and cricketer
- Wal Gillard (1874–1931), Australian-rules footballer
- Wal Gunnyon (1895–1972), Australian-rules footballer
- Wal Heron (1875–1936), Australian-rules footballer
- Wal Jenkins (1897–1978), Australian-rules footballer
- Wal Johnson (1913–1999), Australian-rules footballer
- Wal McGrath (1910–1999), Australian-rules footballer
- Wal McKenzie (1879–1931), Australian-rules footballer
- Wal Matthews (1894–1973), Australian-rules footballer
- Wal Riddington (1893–1954), Australian-rules footballer
- Wal Rogers (1889–1965), Australian-rules footballer
- Wal Romari (1907–1962), Australian-rules footballer
- Wal Smallhorn (1881–1968), Australian-rules footballer
- Wal Warren (1876–1942), Australian-rules footballer
- Wal Williams (1904–1982), Australian-rules footballer

=== Others ===
- Wal Campbell (1906–1979), Australian journalist
- Wal Cherry (1932–1986), Australian stage theatre artist
- Wal Fife (1929–2017), Australian politician
- Wal Hannington (1896–1966), British politician and labour activist
- Wal McDonald, British gangster
- Wal Murray (1931–2004), Australian politician
- Wal Pink (1862—1922), British theatre performer
- Wal Sargent (1935–2012), British-American astronomer
- Wal Torres (born 1950), Brazilian gender therapist

== Fictional characters ==
- Wallace Cadwallader "Wal" Footrot, the main character in the Footrot Flats comic strip
- Wal Rus, a Marvel Comics character, a fictional anthropomorphic walrus

== See also ==
- Wal (disambiguation)
