= WHAL =

WHAL may refer to:

- WHAL-FM, a radio station (95.7 FM) licensed to Horn Lake, Mississippi, United States
- WHTY (AM), a radio station (1460 AM) licensed to Phenix City/Columbus, Alabama, United States, which held the call sign WHAL from 2003 to 2018
- Worli-Haji Ali Sea Link (WHAL) is Sea link in Mumbai, Maharashtra, India
- Whale, a large aquatic mammal

== See also ==
- Whale (disambiguation)
- Wahl (disambiguation)
- Wal (disambiguation)
- Wall (disambiguation)
- Waal (disambiguation)
