= Jean-Pol Vigneron =

Belgian physicist (1950–2013)

- Born: 5 March 1950; Aiseau, Belgium
- Died: 24 June 2013 (aged 63); Namur, Belgium
- Scientific career
- Workplaces: Université de Namur, University of Ouagadougou

Jean-Pol Vigneron (5 March 1950 – 24 June 2013) was a Belgian theoretical physicist and professor at the Université de Namur (formerly the Facultés Universitaires Notre-Dame de la Paix), where he worked from 1980 until his death. He is best known for his later research into the physics of structural coloration in animals — particularly the role of photonic crystals in producing coloration — but his career spanned four decades and encompassed semiconductor surface physics, high-temperature superconductivity, and carbon nanoscience, before he turned to biological optics.

== Early life and education ==
Vigneron was born on 5 March 1950. He studied and later worked at the Facultés Universitaires Notre-Dame de la Paix in Namur, Belgium, joining the physics faculty as a professor in 1980. He remained at the institution — which was renamed the Université de Namur in 2013 — for the rest of his career. He also lectured internationally, including at the University of Ouagadougou (now Université Joseph Ki-Zerbo) in Burkina Faso and at institutions in Morocco, as part of a long-standing commitment to physics education in the developing world.

== Research career ==
=== Surface physics and semiconductor superlattices (1980s) ===
Vigneron's early research, conducted primarily with his Namur colleagues Amand Lucas and Philippe Lambin, focused on the theoretical treatment of how electrons interact with the vibrational modes of semiconductor and insulator surfaces. The group made significant contributions to the dielectric theory of electron energy loss spectroscopy (EELS), developing mathematical frameworks to model the behaviour of electrons at the interfaces of layered materials. A central achievement of this period was the derivation of a general formulation for EELS in multilayered targets — including semiconductor superlattices such as GaAs/AlAs — which expressed the effective dielectric function of an arbitrary layered material as a continued fraction, enabling accurate predictions of surface phonon spectra. This work was cited extensively in the surface physics literature and established the Namur group's reputation in theoretical condensed matter.

In the same period, the group investigated polariton modes in semiconductor multilayer systems, extending their theoretical tools to the optical regime and laying groundwork that would prove useful in Vigneron's later work on photonic structures.

=== High-temperature superconductivity and fullerenes (late 1980s–1990s) ===
In 1987, following the landmark discovery of superconductivity in yttrium barium copper oxide (YBaCuO) by Georg Bednorz and Karl Müller — work that earned them the Nobel Prize in Physics that same year — Vigneron and his colleagues were among the many condensed matter groups worldwide who rapidly turned their attention to these new high-temperature superconductors. In the early 1990s, his interests shifted again toward the newly isolated fullerene family of carbon nanostructures. Working again with Lambin and Lucas, he contributed to the theoretical understanding of the optical and cohesive properties of C60 fullerite — the solid-state form of buckminsterfullerene — modelling the role of polarisation waves and van der Waals forces in binding the crystal together.

=== Biological photonics (2000s–2013) ===
From the late 1990s onwards, Vigneron turned his attention to the optics of biological systems, applying his expertise in theoretical photonics to the study of naturally occurring photonic crystals and structural coloration in animals. This work addressed the physical mechanisms by which insects, marine invertebrates, and other animals produce vivid, often iridescent colours through nanoscale structural periodicity rather than chemical pigmentation. He became one of the leading figures in this emerging field, collaborating widely with biologists and physicists internationally and publishing extensively on species ranging from comb jellies to weevils, beetles, butterflies, and spiders.

In 2009, Vigneron organised the first international meeting in this field, a workshop on bio-inspired photonic structures held in San Sebastián, Spain, which he initiated under the informal title that would evolve into the Living Light conference series. Following his death in 2013, the conference was formally renamed Living Light in his honour, with the first memorial meeting chaired by Philippe Lambin at the Université de Namur in April 2014.

== Recognition ==
Vigneron was elected a member of the Academia Europaea (Physics and Engineering Sciences section) in 2000. In 2007, he was elected a member of the prestigious Royal Academies for Science and the Arts of Belgium,.. He died on 24 June 2013, at the age of 63.

== Selected publications ==
- Lambin, Ph., Vigneron, J. P. & Lucas, A. A. (1985). "Electron-energy-loss spectroscopy of multilayered materials: Theoretical aspects and study of interface optical phonons in semiconductor superlattices". Physical Review B, 32(12), 8203–8228. doi:10.1103/PhysRevB.32.8203
- Lambin, Ph., Laloyaux, T., Lucas, A. A. & Vigneron, J. P. (1987). "Theory of electron-energy-loss spectroscopy of surface and interface phonons in a two-medium target with a transverse boundary". Physical Review B, 35(11), 5621–5634. doi:10.1103/PhysRevB.35.5621
- Dereux, A., Vigneron, J.-P., Lambin, Ph. & Lucas, A. A. (1988). "Polaritons in semiconductor multilayered materials". Physical Review B, 38(8), 5438–5452. doi:10.1103/PhysRevB.38.5438
- Lambin, Ph., Vigneron, J. P. & Lucas, A. A. (1992). "Polarization waves and van der Waals cohesion of C60 fullerite". Physical Review B, 46(3), 1794–1803. doi:10.1103/PhysRevB.46.1794
- Welch, V. L., Vigneron, J.-P. & Parker, A. R. (2005). "The cause of coloration in the ctenophore Beroë cucumis". Current Biology, 15(24), R985–R986. doi:10.1016/j.cub.2005.11.060
- Welch, V., Vigneron, J.-P., Lousse, V. & Parker, A. (2006). "Optical properties of the iridescent organ of the comb jellyfish, Beroë cucumis (Ctenophora)". Physical Review E, 73(4), 041916. doi:10.1103/PhysRevE.73.041916
- Welch, V. L. & Vigneron, J.-P. (2007). "Beyond Butterflies – the Diversity of Biological Photonic Crystals". Optical and Quantum Electronics, 39, 295–303. doi:10.1007/s11082-007-9094-2
- Welch, V., Lousse, V., Deparis, O., Parker, A. & Vigneron, J.-P. (2007). "Orange reflection from a three-dimensional photonic crystal in the scales of the weevil Pachyrrhynchus congestus pavonius (Curculionidae)". Physical Review E, 75(4), 041919. doi:10.1103/PhysRevE.75.041919
