= Wahl =

Wahl may refer to:

- Wahl (surname)
- Wahl, Luxembourg, commune and small town in the canton of Redange, Luxembourg
- Wahl, Alabama, unincorporated community, United States
- Wahl Clipper Corporation

== See also ==
- Wal (disambiguation)
- Waal (disambiguation)
- WHAL (disambiguation)
- Wall (disambiguation)
