= Walls =

Walls may refer to:

- The plural of wall, a structure
- Walls (surname), a list of notable people with the surname

== Places ==
- Walls, Louisiana, United States
- Walls, Mississippi, United States
- Walls, Ontario, neighborhood in Perry, Ontario, Canada
- Walls, Shetland, Scotland, United Kingdom
- South Walls, Orkney Islands, Scotland, United Kingdom

== Products ==
- Wall's (ice cream)
- Wall's (meat)

== Music ==
- The Walls, Irish rock band
- Walls (band), British electronic indie duo

=== Albums ===
- Walls (EP), a 2005 EP by The Red Paintings
- Walls (Apparat album), 2007
- Walls (An Horse album), 2011
- Walls (Gateway Worship album), 2015
- Walls (Kings of Leon album), 2016
- Walls (Barbra Streisand album), 2018
- Walls (Louis Tomlinson album), 2020

=== Songs ===
- "Walls" (Icehouse song), 1980
- "Walls" (Kings of Leon song), 2016
- "Walls" (Louis Tomlinson song), 2020
- "Walls" (Ruben song), 2017
- "Walls" (The Rocket Summer song), 2010
- "Walls" (Yes song), 1994
- "Walls (Circus)", a song by Tom Petty and the Heartbreakers, 1996
- "The Walls" (song), a song by Mario, 2011
- "Walls", an unreleased song by electronic music duo Elite Gymnastics
- "Walls", a song by All Time Low from Nothing Personal
- "Walls", a song by the Cat Empire from Where the Angels Fall
- "Walls", a song by DC Talk from Nu Thang
- "Walls", a song by Gordon Lightfoot from The Way I Feel
- "Walls", a song by John Frusciante and Josh Klinghoffer from A Sphere in the Heart of Silence
- "Walls", a song by Jonas Brothers from The Album, 2023
- "Mury" (song) (Polish: "Walls"), a protest song by Jacek Kaczmarski, 1978

== Film and TV ==
- Walls (1968 film)
- Walls (1984 film)
- "Walls", an episode of Power Rangers S.P.D.

== See also ==
- Wals (disambiguation)
- Wall's (disambiguation)
- Walls House (disambiguation), several houses in the United States
- Wall (disambiguation)
