= Walter Burleigh =

Walter Burleigh may refer to:

- Walter Burley, medieval English philosopher
- Walter A. Burleigh, American physician and lawyer
- Wal Burleigh, Australian rules footballer
- Walter Burley Griffin, American architect
