= John Wall (disambiguation) =

John Wall (born 1990) is an American professional basketball player.

John Wall may also refer to the following people:

== Politicians ==
=== American politicians ===
- John A. Wall (1847–1886), Wisconsin state politician
- John F. Wall (politician) (1799–1884), American politician from Virginia
- John P. Wall (1836–1895), physician and mayor in Tampa, Florida
- John Wall (North Dakota politician) (1943–2014), North Dakota educator and politician

=== Other politicians ===
- John Wall (MP) (died 1435), English Mayor and MP of Newcastle-upon-Tyne
- John Wall (Canadian politician) (1938–2010), Canadian educator and politician

== Other people ==
- John Wall (priest and antiquarian) (1588–1666), English priest and antiquarian
- John Wall (electronic composer) (born 1950), English electroacoustic composer and improviser
- John Wall (inventor) (1932–2018), amateur telescope maker, inventor of Crayford focuser
- John Wall (judge) (1930–2008), British solicitor who was the first blind judge to be appointed to the High Court of Justice
- John Wall (physician) (1708–1776), English physician
- John Wall (priest and martyr) (1620–1679), Catholic martyr and saint
- John F. Wall (1931-2024), U.S. Army general
- John Wall (philosopher) (born 1965) American educator and theoretical ethicist
- John Wall, Baron Wall (1913–1980), British businessman and peer

== See also ==
- Jack Wall (disambiguation)
- John Wall Callcott (1766–1821), composer
- John Wall Dance, a dance step
