= Tierrasanta, San Diego =

Tierrasanta, San Diego T Town
- Community of San Diego
- Tierrasanta
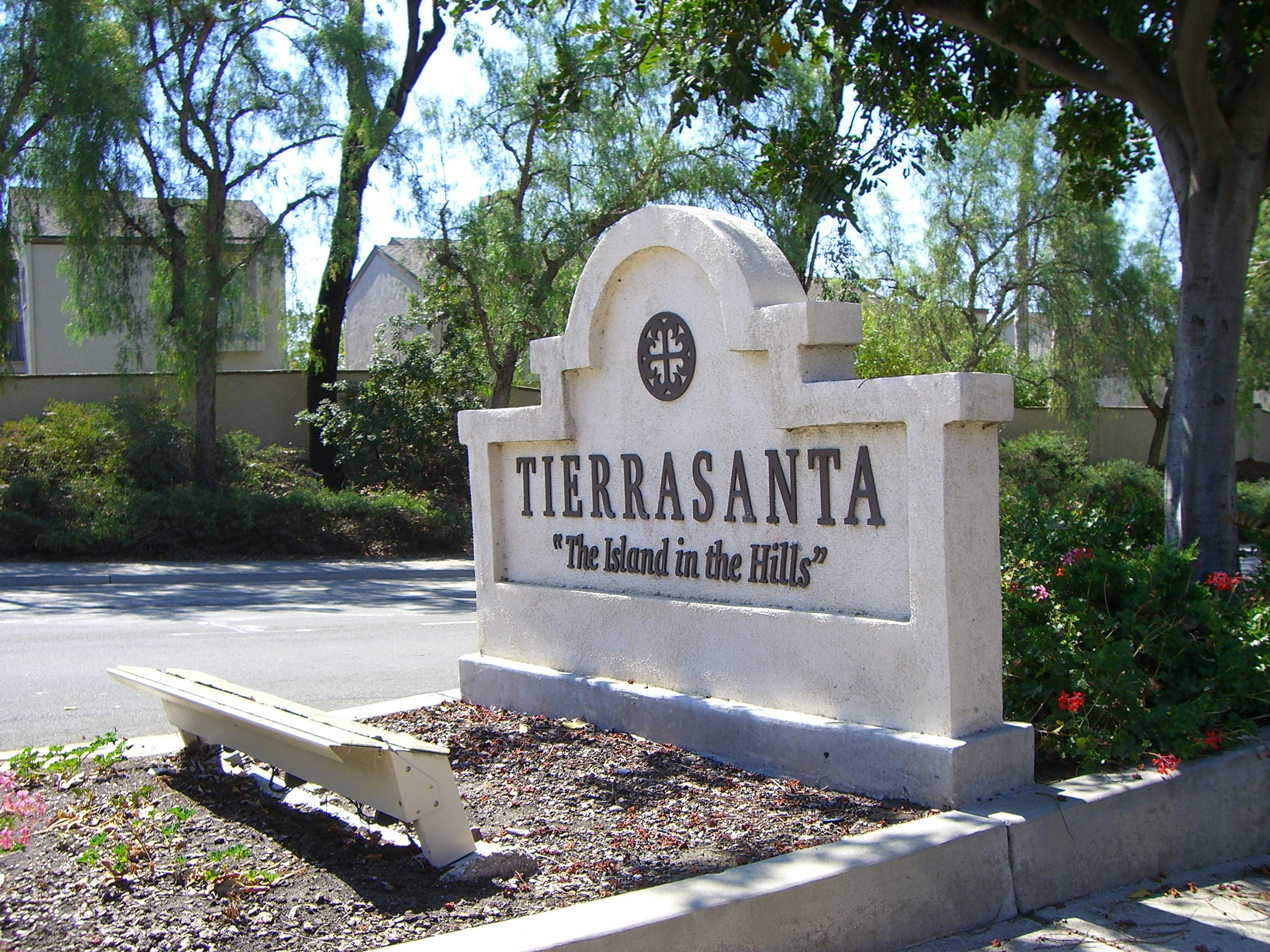
- The Tierrasanta sign located on Santo Road

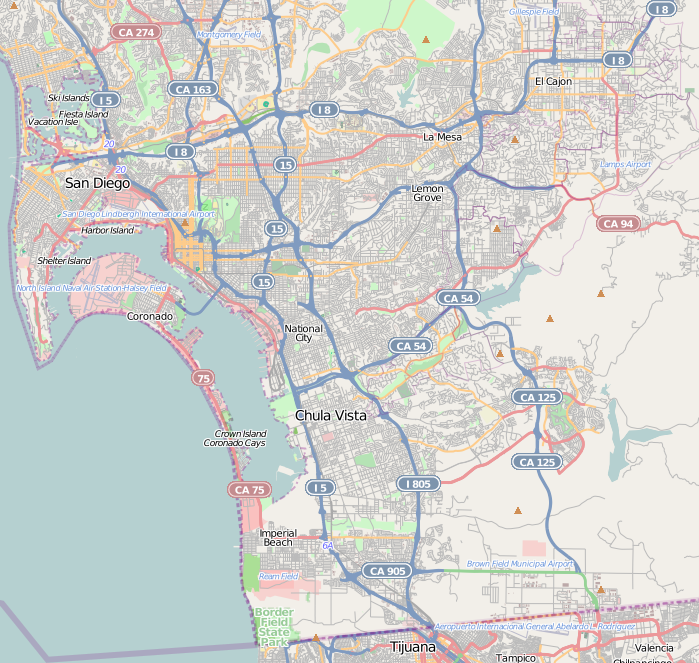
- Location within San Diego
- Coordinates: 32.820833°N 117.096389°W
- Country: United States of America
- State: California
- County: San Diego
- City: San Diego
- Elevation: 354 ft (108 m)
- Highest elevation: 780 ft (240 m)
- Lowest elevation: 180 ft (55 m)

Population (2010)
  - Total: 30,443
- Postal code: 92124
- Area codes: 858, 619

Tierrasanta, Spanish for "holy land," or "holy ground", is a community in San Diego, California. The symbol of Tierrasanta is an encircled Conquistador cross, similar to one atop Montserrat mountain near Barcelona, Spain, though it no longer holds any religious meaning. The community is referred to as "The Island in the Hills" by locals and on welcome signs, as there are only four roads that lead to Tierrasanta, all which end within the community.

== History ==
Tierrasanta was originally part of the Mission San Diego de Alcalá ranch, which was active during the late 18th and 19th centuries. The U.S. military purchased the land in 1941 as Camp Elliott, a Marine Corps training facility. The Marines moved out in 1944 and the land was transferred to the Navy. It was deactivated in 1946. In 1961, the U.S. Government sold the area that is now Tierrasanta and a portion of neighboring Mission Trails Regional Park to the City of San Diego. In the following year, the Elliott Community Plan was issued to serve as a roadmap for development going forward, and in 1971 Tierrasanta was founded. The current Tierrasanta community plan was first issued in 1982, and included both the currently developed area and much of what is now Mission Trails Regional Park. Meanwhile, the first master plan for what was to become Mission Trails Regional Park was issued in 1976 with the aid of numerous public agencies, planning groups, and a 45-member Technical Advisory Committee.

Tierrasanta's population had reached about 24,000 by 1980 and when the 1982 Plan was issued the area called Tierrasanta Norte, in the northeastern part of town, had yet to be fully developed. Tierrasanta has been almost fully built out since the early 1990s, and in 2010 had a population of 30,443 (ZIP code 92124). Some 2,300 homes grouped in the southwest portion of town are part of the Murphy Canyon military housing complex. Tierrasanta was one of the first master planned communities in San Diego.

The original Community Plan called for an eastward extension of Clairemont Mesa Boulevard, with connections to Jackson Drive on the south and Route 52 on the north. However, there long was opposition to the plan due to expected increased high speed traffic. The 2019 Master Plan Update to Mission Trails Regional Park apparently settled the issue when it declared the plan to no longer be implementable due to resource management requirements.

In addition, there was supposed to be a connection from Tierrasanta Boulevard to Princess View Drive, but this was never constructed. There are also no plans to connect the two Santo Road segments.

Because of the area's history as a military training base, some military debris including unexploded ordnance remained in the area when it was developed, in spite of multiple cleanup efforts by different branches of the services. In 1983 two 8-year-old Tierrasanta boys were killed after discovering unexploded ordnance in a canyon near their home. The military performed clearance operations as recently as 1994 and the U.S. Army Corps of Engineers continues to investigate the area every five years under its FUDS (Formerly Used Defense Sites) program.

In October 2003, Tierrasanta, among other communities in San Diego, was affected by what was known as "Firestorm 2003." This was a conglomeration of the Cedar Fire and numerous other wildfires that converged on Southern California. The residents of Tierrasanta were forced to evacuate. Nearly a dozen homes were lost to the blaze. Shortly after, in 2004, the Tierrasanta Community Emergency Response Team (T-CERT) was created for rapid local response to natural disasters. A similar scare swept through Tierrasanta in the fall of 2007, though residents were not required to evacuate.

In the early morning of May 22, 2025, a private Cessna Citation II jet crashed on Sample Street in Tierrasanta’s Murphy Canyon neighborhood, killing all six people aboard. The jet, attempting to land at Montgomery-Gibbs Executive Airport in dense fog, struck power lines before skidding down the street and igniting cars parked along the curb in flames due to jet fuel ignition. Several homes sustained damage, and roughly 100 residents were temporarily evacuated. Federal investigations were ongoing as of mid-2025.

== Geography ==
The developed part of Tierrasanta, which rises from west to east and includes numerous canyons, is situated like an island, not directly bordered by any other community. It is bounded on the north by the Mount Soledad (52) Freeway and the sprawling southern fields of MCAS Miramar; on the east by the 8,000-acre (32 km^{2}) Mission Trails Regional Park, which has numerous hiking and mountain biking trails; on the west by slopes overlooking the wide Interstate 15 corridor running from Friars Road to Route 52, and on the south with homes overlooking the Admiral Baker Golf Course and the San Diego River. Community activities focus on the Tierrasanta Recreation Center, which includes lighted sports fields, a large swimming pool, tennis courts managed by the Tierrasanta Tennis Club, a gymnasium, and meeting rooms. Numerous green belts with walking paths run through the canyons, and are maintained by the Friends of the Tierrasanta Canyons. There are a number of entrances to Mission Trails Regional Park, including an entrance with parking at the eastern end of Clairemont Mesa Boulevard.

Like most of the coastal areas in Southern California, the natural habitat in the canyons and other undeveloped areas within Tierrasanta, as well as in much of MCAS Miramar and Mission Trails Regional Park, is coastal sage scrub and chaparral.

As described in its 1982 Community Plan, Tierrasanta is a community of single family homes, condominiums, apartments, three shopping centers, a branch of the San Diego Public Library, and a research park. Also located in the community are several elementary and middle schools and Canyon Hills High School, part of San Diego Unified School District.

== Government and culture ==
The elected Tierrasanta Community Council (TCC), which includes members from each of five geographic areas, plus representatives for commercial, Village Mission Valley Apartments, and Canyon Hills High, has responsibility for community planning and for advising the City of San Diego and other government agencies on local issues. The TCC supports numerous events in the community such as the Concert in the park series, the Patriots Day Parade honoring Armed Forces Day on the third Saturday in May, Oktoberfest and other events.

Dedicated open space areas and landscaped medians are maintained by the Tierrasanta Maintenance Assessment District, which was established in 1972 and most recently approved by voters in 1997. The 818 acres of Tierrasanta Open Space qualifies this urban park as one of the 150 largest in the United States.

The Friends of Tierrasanta Canyons is a Tierrasanta-based volunteer group that maintains the open spaces of the neighborhood's canyons.

As of 2021 Tierrasanta's elected representatives included San Diego City Councilman Raul Campillo, County Supervisor Terra Lawson-Remer of District 3, State Assembly Member Brian Maienschein, Democrat, of District 77, State Senator Toni Atkins, Democrat, of District 39, and Congressman Scott Peters, Democrat, of California's 52nd District.

== Cultural amenities ==
The community has a branch library, jogging/mountain biking trails, baseball and soccer teams, and numerous clubs. The Tierra Times, a community service newspaper, has been published since 1971, and is delivered free to all residents six or more times per year.

An Armed Services YMCA is located in the Murphy Canyon area. Navy Region Southwest's Admiral Baker Golf Club on the southern edge of Tierrasanta has two golf courses with priority given to active duty and retired military members, but is also open to civilians from nearby communities such as Tierrasanta.

== Notable residents ==
- Tony Hawk, professional skateboarder
- Chris Horner, bicycle racer
- Sara Ramirez, actor, singer, songwriter
- Erik Wahl, graffiti artist and author
- Avalon Young, American Idol (Season 15) finalist
- Mundell Lowe, jazz guitarist
