= Wals =

Wals may refer to:

- Wals-Siezenheim, a suburb of Salzburg, Austria
- WALS, an American radio station
- World Atlas of Language Structures, a map software for linguistic typology
- Gottfried Wals (c. 1595 – 1638), German painter

== See also ==
- Vals (disambiguation)
- Walls (disambiguation)
- WALS (disambiguation)
- Walz, surname
