= Aesthetica =

Art and culture magazine

- Cover of Aesthetica, Issue 92, 2019
- Editor: Cherie Federico
- Categories: Art; Architecture; Design; Fashion; Photography
- Frequency: Bi-monthly
- Publisher: Cherie Federico; Dale Donley
- Founded: 2002; 24 years ago
- First issue: 2003
- Company: Aesthetica Magazine Ltd
- Country: United Kingdom
- Based in: York
- Language: English
- Website: aestheticamagazine.com
- ISSN: 1743-2715

Aesthetica Magazine is a publication focusing on art and culture. Established in 2002, the magazine provides bi-monthly coverage of contemporary art across various disciplines, including visual arts, photography, architecture, fashion and design. It has a readership of over 950,000 and national and international distribution, with a significant online presence.

Aesthetica also organizes a range of awards, exhibitions, and events in the fields of art, photography, literature, and film. These include the Future Now Symposium, the Art Prize, the Creative Writing Award and the BAFTA-QualifyingAesthetica Film Festival.

== History ==
Aesthetica was founded by Cherie Federico and Dale Donley, while they were students at York St John University, in 2002.

In 2003, the magazine expanded its distribution to Borders. By 2007, Aesthetica became available in WHSmith high-street stores and prominent galleries such as the ICA, Tate and National Portrait Gallery in London, Arnolfini in Bristol, and the Centre for Contemporary Arts in Glasgow. In 2009, Aesthetica significantly expanded its distribution network and can now be found in major airports, train stations across the country, department stores like Selfridges and Harrods, and is exported to more than 20 countries worldwide.

In June 2019, Cherie Federico, who serves as managing director and editor of Aesthetica, was honoured as a Fellow of the Royal Society of Arts in 2008. She was awarded an Honorary Doctorate from London College of Communication, University of the Arts London.

== Content ==
Aesthetica Magazine encompasses a wide range of subjects including art, design, architecture, fashion, film, and music. The publication features articles on notable new exhibitions worldwide and presents contemporary photography by both emerging and established practitioners. The magazine has showcased the works of artists including Steve McQueen, Martin Creed, Ai Weiwei, Jenny Holzer, Alex Prager, Stephen Shore, Joel Meyerowitz, Cindy Sherman, Viviane Sassen, and others.

The articles published in Aesthetica delve into various topics, such as the relationship between art and politics, the fusion of fashion and technology, contemporary minimalist design, and innovations in architecture.

=== Photography ===
A significant portion of Aesthetica Magazine is dedicated to photography, featuring photo essays by artists such as Richard Tuschman and Stephen Shore. The publication has also showcased the works of photographers like Julia Fullerton-Batten, Maia Flore, Carolina Mizrahi, Formento & Formento, Ryan Schude, Natalia Evelyn Bencicova, Maria Svarbova, Brad Walls, Kevin Cooley, Emily Shur, Miles Aldridge, and Michael Wolf. Recent issues have featured cover photographs by creative duos including Sally Ann & Emily May, JUCO, Yossi Michaeli, Eugenio Recuenco, Daniel Korzewa, Jacques Olivar, and Jimmy Marble.

=== Exhibitions ===
Aesthetica Magazine provides coverage of the exhibitions opening at major art institutions worldwide. The editorial team highlights exhibitions and their significance in the art world. Previous features have included exhibitions such as "Hello, my name is Paul Smith" at the Design Museum, London, "What is Luxury?" at the V&A, London, "The Future of Fashion is Now" at the Museum Boijmans Van Beuningen in Rotterdam, Frank Gehry's retrospective at Centre Pompidou; Mona Hatoum's retrospective at Tate Modern, a collection of Pierre Paulin's designs at Centre Pompidou, Jenny Holzer's site-specific commission at MASS MoCA, Anthony McCall at The Hepworth, Ai Weiwei at Yorkshire Sculpture Park, Gregory Crewdson at The Photographers' Gallery, "The Future Starts Here" at the V&A and "Björk Digital" at Somerset House.

=== Architecture ===
Aesthetica Magazine focuses on architecture features that revolve around urban development, sustainability, geopolitics and adaptability. Previous articles have explored architects and events such as Frank Gehry, Venice Biennale, Bernard Tschumi, the Chicago Architecture Biennale, the Serpentine Pavilions and the RIBA Stirling Prize. These features focus on architectural innovations, design concepts, and socio-political implications related to urban spaces, sustainability practices, and the evolving nature of architecture in response to contemporary challenges.

=== Design ===
Aesthetica Magazine frequently showcases features on design, exploring various aspects such as social spaces, domestic solutions, and contemporary practices of the 21st century. The publication has covered significant design events including the London Design Biennale, the Shanghai Expo, the Stockholm Furniture and Light Fair and Surface Design Show. In addition, Aesthetica publishes articles on new releases from prestigious publishing houses such as Prestel Publishing and Thames and Hudson, providing insights into design trends, innovations, and influential works in the field.

=== Fashion ===
Aesthetica Magazine has extensively covered the realm of fashion, featuring designers and institutions in the industry. The publication has showcased designers from London Fashion Week. including emerging talents and established names. Notable designers such as Iris van Herpen, Viktor & Rolf, Pauline van Dongen, Crafting Plastics!, and exhibitions from The Metropolitan Museum of Art have been prominently featured.

=== Film ===
Aesthetica Magazine's film section offers reviews and exploration of new films, with a particular emphasis on works of artistic merit. The publication has covered a diverse range of filmmakers including Alice Lowe, Ben Wheatley, Richard Ayoade, Atiq Rahimi, and Michel Gondry. Aesthetica has reviewed films such as Pawel Pawlikowski's BAFTA-winning Ida, Yann Demange's BAFTA-nominated '71, and Iain Forsyth and Jane Pollard's 20,000 Days on Earth, which won the Editing Award and the Directing Award at Sundance in the World Cinema Documentary category. Additionally, the film section often explores film festivals and features interviews with festival programmers, cinematographers, directors, writers, and other industry professionals, providing a comprehensive perspective on the world of cinema.

=== Music ===
Aesthetica Magazine delves into various facets of music, exploring diverse topics such as the manipulation of found sounds, the creation of music from video games, the influence of YouTube on the music industry, and the evolution of music videos. The publication also covers subjects such as opera, dance music, instrument design, musical comedy, production techniques, and album packaging. Furthermore, Aesthetica conducts interviews with acclaimed musicians, including award-winning artists like Alt-J, CHVRCHES, Chelsea Wolfe, and Anna of the North, providing insights into their creative processes and perspectives on the contemporary music landscape.

=== Last Words ===
At the end of each magazine is the section "Last Words", which features work and a statement by a prominent artist. Previous artists include Cornelia Parker, Julio Le Parc, Marie Hald, Chiharu Shiota and Do Ho Suh.

=== Artists' Directory ===
Aesthetica also offers the Artists' Directory network for both emerging and established practitioners. This provides an opportunity for artists to connect with art collectors and gallerists.

== Awards ==
=== Aesthetica Film Festival ===
The Aesthetica Film Festival is an international film festival that takes place annually in York, England, in early November. Founded in 2011, it celebrates independent film from around the world, and is an outlet for supporting and championing filmmaking. The programme includes more than 400 film screenings and 100 events, such as masterclasses, networking sessions, panel discussions and an Industry Marketplace.

The festival is also a BAFTA and BIFA qualifying festival, meaning short films that are screened may be eligible for these awards.

All films in the Official Selection are in competition to receive a number of awards. The winning films are selected by a jury of industry experts, and are presented at the Closing Night Awards Ceremony.

=== Aesthetica Art Prize ===
The Aesthetica Art Prize is an annual award celebrating contemporary artists through exhibition and publication. Two prizes are awarded: Main and Emerging. The exhibition has taken place at York Art Gallery since 2017, and has exhibited works from practitioners including Magnum photographers, Turner Prize-nominees, RSA Film directors, World Press Photo winners and Prix Pictet nominees. The Prize attracts thousands of entries each year from countries including Australia, Belgium, China, France, Germany, Italy, Japan, Mexico, Norway, Singapore, the UK and the USA. The judging panel has included representatives from BALTIC, Frieze, V&A, Guggenheim, British Council, Brooklyn Museum and FACT Liverpool.

=== Aesthetica Future Now Symposium ===
The Future Now Symposium is a two-day annual event. It brings together key institutions, galleries and publications for discussion surrounding pressing issues from the creative industries. Future Now describes itself as "a platform for idea generation" and includes debates, career advice and cultural engagement.

Originally launched in 2016, Future Now sessions are led by artists, curators, academics and representatives from cultural institutions in the UK such as Tate, Art Fund, Arts Council England, Whitechapel Gallery, Royal College of Art, Frieze, V&A, Getty Images Gallery, The Art Newspaper, Foam Amsterdam, RIBA, Magnum Photos, London Art Fair, The Design Museum, Serpentine Galleries, BALTIC, Creative Review, Photo London, Design Museum, Glasgow School of Art, MoMA, High Museum of Art, Fondazione Prada, Gagosian, International Center of Photography, ICA Boston and British Council. Future Now's sixth edition was hosted completely online.

=== Aesthetica Creative Writing Award ===
The Aesthetica Creative Writing Award is an international literary prize for established and emerging poets and writers. Shortlisted entries are published annually in the Aesthetica Creative Writing Award Anthology; whilst category winners receive a share of £5,000 prize money.
