= Walls (surname) =

Walls is a surname. Notable people with the surname include:

== In arts and entertainment ==
- Bob Walls (1927–1999), New Zealand painter
- Brad Walls (born 1992), Australian aerial photographer
- David Leslie Walls (born 1964), birthname of English rock musician Ginger Wildheart
- Frank Walls (illustrator) (born 1973), American illustrator
- Horace Walls III (born 2001), American rapper professionally known as Nardo Wick
- Grace Walls Linn (1874-1940), American composer
- Jeannette Walls (born 1960), American writer
- Martin Walls (born 1970), British-American poet
- Nancy Carell (née Walls; born 1966), American actress, comedian, and writer
- Sinqua Walls (born 1985), American actor and basketball player
- Tom Walls (1883–1949), English actor
- Winston Walls (1942–2008), American jazz musician

== In government, law, and military ==
- Jim Walls, American police officer
- Johnnie Walls (1944 or 1945–2025), American lawyer and politician
- Josiah T. Walls (1842–1905), American politician
- Peter Walls (1927–2010), Rhodesian military officer
- Richard Walls (1937–2011), New Zealand politician
- William H. Walls (1932–2019), American judge

== In science and academia ==
- Daniel Frank Walls (1942–1999), New Zealand physicist
- David Walls (academic) (born 1941), American academic
- Gordon Lynn Walls (1905–1962), American biologist
- Laura Walls, American professor of English literature

== In sport ==
=== American football ===
- Bill Walls (1912–1993), American football player
- Craig Walls (born 1958), American football player
- Darrin Walls (born 1988), American football player
- Everson Walls (born 1959), former NFL player
- Gavin Walls (born 1980), American football player
- Herkie Walls (born 1961), American arena football player
- Lenny Walls (born 1979), American football player
- Raymond Walls (born 1979), American football player
- Wesley Walls (born 1966), American football player
- Will Walls (1912–1993), American football player

=== Other sports ===
- Earl Walls (1928–1996), Canadian professional boxer
- James Walls (1892–?), Scottish footballer
- Jaquay Walls (born 1978), American basketball player
- Lee Walls (1933–1993), baseball player
- Mickey Walls (born 1974), Canadian jockey
- Moira Walls (born 1952), Scottish high jumper
- Rab Walls (1908–1992), Scottish footballer
- Robert Walls (1950–2025), Australian footballer, coach and commentator
- Sinqua Walls (born 1985), American actor and basketball player
- Taylor Walls (born 1996), American baseball player
- Tony Walls (born 1990), American soccer player

== In other fields ==
- Andrew Walls (1928–2021), British theologian
- Frank A. Walls (1967–2025), American executed serial killer
- William Walls (1819–1893), Scottish lawyer, industrialist and Glasgow Dean of Guild

== See also ==
- Wall (surname)
- Walls (disambiguation)
