= Wall (disambiguation) =

A wall is a solid structure that provides a barrier or enclosure.

Wall, WALL, or The Wall may also refer to:

== Arts and entertainment ==
=== Films ===
- Wall (Original French title: "Mur"), a French–Israeli film about the Israeli West Bank barrier
- The Wall (1962 film), an American propaganda film about the erection of the Berlin Wall
- The Wall (1967 film), a 1967 French drama
- Deewaar (The Wall), a 1975 Indian crime drama directed by Yash Chopra
- Pink Floyd – The Wall, a 1982 film based on the music album by Pink Floyd
- The Wall, a 1982 Holocaust drama starring Tom Conti
- The Wall (1998 American film), a 1998 TV film
- The Wall (1998 Belgian film), a Belgian tragicomedy film by Alain Berliner
- The Wall (2011 film), a 2011 French film
- The Wall (2012 film), a 2012 Austrian film
- Roger Waters: The Wall, a 2014 concert film documenting The Wall Live (2010–2013), Roger Waters' worldwide tour of Pink Floyd's 1979 album, The Wall
- The Wall (2017 film), a war film starring Aaron Taylor-Johnson and John Cena

=== Literature ===
- The Wall (A Song of Ice and Fire), a structure within the world of the epic fantasy novel series by George R. R. Martin
- The Wall (Bykaŭ short story collection), by Belarusian writer Vasil Bykaŭ, 1997
- The Wall (Haushofer novel), by Austrian writer Marlen Haushofer, 1963
- The Wall (Sartre short story collection), by French writer Jean-Paul Sartre, 1939
- The Wall, a novel by John Hersey about the Warsaw Ghetto, 1950
- The Wall (Lanchester novel), a novel by John Lanchester set in a future dystopian Britain, 2019
- The Wall, a novel by Mary Roberts Rinehart, 1938
- The Wall, a novel by William Sutcliffe, 2013
- The Wall, a novel by Peter Vansittart, 1990
- The Wall (Bhatia novel), by Indian author Gautam Bhatia, 2020
- The Wall: Growing Up Behind the Iron Curtain, a children's book by Peter Sís, 2007
- The Wall Around Eden, a novel by Joan Slonczewski, 1989

=== Music ===
==== Bands ====
- The Wall (band), a punk rock band formed in 1978
- Bức Tường (The Wall), a Vietnamese glam metal band

==== Albums ====
- The Wall, an album by Pink Floyd released in 1979

==== Concerts and tours ====
- The Wall Tour (1980–81), a 1980–81 tour to promote the Pink Floyd album The Wall
- The Wall – Live in Berlin, a 1990 charity concert by Roger Waters after his departure from Pink Floyd
- The Wall Live (2010–13), a 2010-13 tour by Roger Waters

==== Songs ====
- "The Wall" (Michelle Wright song), 1994
- "The Wall" (1957 song), a song from 1957 by Patti Page
- "The Wall" (Willie Nelson song), 2013
- "The Wall" (Kansas song), 1976
- "The Wall", by Johnny Cash on At Folsom Prison, 1968
- "The Wall", by Bruce Springsteen on High Hopes, 2014
- "The Wall", by Kasabian on The Alchemist's Euphoria, 2022
- "The Wall", by Yuck, 2011
- "The Wall", composed by Ramin Djawadi on Game of Thrones: Season 1 (soundtrack), 2011
- "The Wall", composed by Thomas Newman on Bridge of Spies (soundtrack), 2015
- "La Pared" ("The Wall"), by Shakira on Fijación Oral, Vol. 1, 2005
- "Wall" (Good Kid song), 2025
- "Wall", by Living Colour from Stain, 1993

=== Television ===
==== Programs and series ====
- The Wall (American game show), a 2017 American television game show
  - The Wall (Australian game show), a 2017 Australian television game show based on the American version
  - The Wall (British game show), a 2019 British television game show based on the American version
  - The Wall (Chilean game show), the 2018 Chilean adaptation of the American game show with Rafael Araneda
  - The Wall (Brazilian game show segment), a 2018 Brazilian segment based on the American game show of the same name that airs on Domingão com Huck
  - The Wall Philippines, a 2021 Philippine television game show based on the American version
- The Wall (2008 TV series), a 2008 British comedy television programme debuting in 2008
- La Faille a 2019 French Canadian TV series, referred to as The Wall in some markets

==== Episodes and events ====
- "The Wall" (Heroes), a 2010 episode
- "The Wall" (Reno 911!), a 2008 episode
- "The Wall" (The Twilight Zone), a 1989 episode
- "The Wall" (The Unit), a 2006 episode
- "The Wall", a 1989 episode of Alvin and the Chipmunks
- The Wall, an event from Gladiators

=== Other uses in arts and entertainment ===
- Wall (play), a 2009 play by David Hare
- The Wall (SoHo), a piece of art
- Wall bang, to shoot someone through a wall or object in videogames

== Brands and enterprises ==
- WALL, an AM radio station in Middletown, New York, US
- Wall, a chain of music stores owned in 1997 by WHSmith and acquired in 1998 by Camelot Music

== People ==
- Wall (surname), list of notable people with the surname
- Rahul Dravid, an Indian cricketer nicknamed "The Wall"
- Jerry Tuite, a deceased WCW professional wrestler, whose ring name was "The Wall"
- Nathaniel Wallich, Danish botanist (taxonomic abbreviation "Wall.")
- John William Wallace, reporter of decisions for the US Supreme Court, abbreviated "Wall."

== Places ==
=== United Kingdom ===
- Wall, Northumberland, England
- Wall, Staffordshire, England

=== United States ===
- Wall, Pennsylvania
- Wall, South Dakota
- Wall, Texas
- The Wall (mountain), a mountain in the Teton Range, Grand Teton National Park, Wyoming
- Wall Creek, Oregon
- Wall Street, the financial district of New York City
- Wall Township, New Jersey
- Green Monster (sometimes known as "The Wall"), a feature at Fenway Park in Boston
- The Wall, the Memorial Wall of the Vietnam Veterans Memorial

=== Elsewhere ===
- The Wall, a structure in Fermont, Quebec, Canada
- Sultan Aji Muhammad Sulaiman Sepinggan Airport (ICAO: WALL), Balikpapan, East Kalimantan, Indonesia

== Science and technology ==
- Wall (butterfly) or Lasiommata megera, a butterfly in the family Nymphalidae
- wall (Unix) or wall(1), a unix command-line utility to write messages to users
- Facebook Wall, a feature on Facebook that allows users to post comments and links on their friends' profile pages
- Galaxy wall, a subtype of galaxy filament
- Hitting the wall, a state of severe fatigue caused by sudden glycogen depletion, usually felt in marathons after running long distances non-stop

== Other uses ==
- The Wall, the Memorial Wall of the Vietnam Veterans Memorial
- Sultan Aji Muhammad Sulaiman Sepinggan Airport (ICAO: WALL), Balikpapan, East Kalimantan, Indonesia
- Green Monster (sometimes known as "The Wall"), a feature at Fenway Park in Boston

== See also ==
- Wall Street (disambiguation)
- Wall's (disambiguation)
- Walls (disambiguation)
- Wal (disambiguation)
- Walle (name)
