= Wall Creek =

River in Oregon, United States

Coordinates: 42°06′37″N 122°35′54″W

Wall Creek is a stream in the U.S. state of Oregon. It is a tributary to Hill Creek.

Wall Creek was named in the 1870s after one Andrew J. Walls.
