= Jack Wall =

Jack Wall is the name of:

- Jack Wall (composer) (born 1964), American video game music composer
- John Wall (electronic composer) (born 1950), English electronic composer
- Jack Wall (politician) (born 1945), Irish Labour Party politician
- Jack Wall (rugby league), Australian rugby player of the 1940s and the 1950s

== See also ==
- John Wall (disambiguation)
