= Marjan van Aubel =

Dutch artist and designer (born 1985)

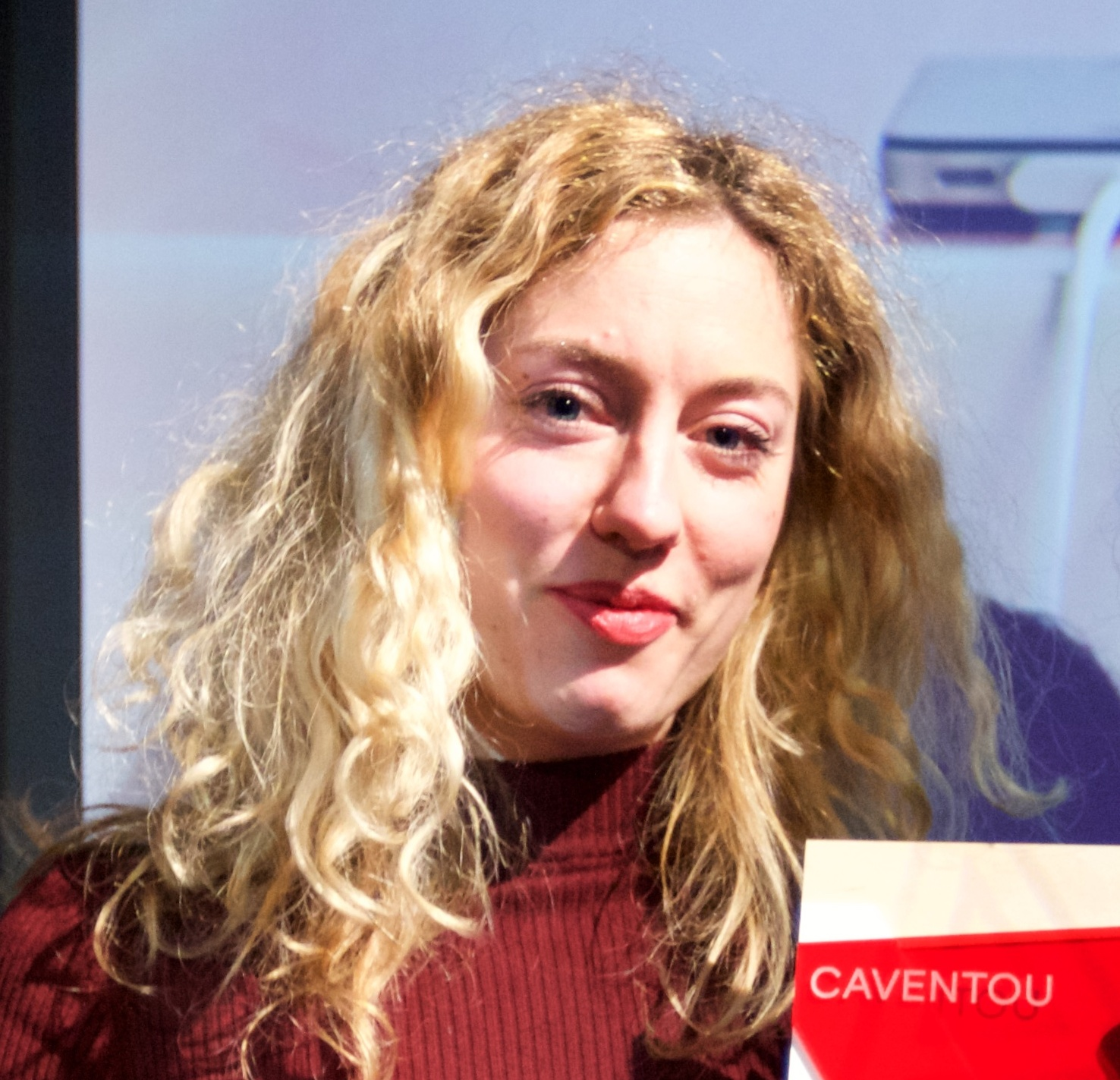
- Born: 1985 (age 40–41); Bergen op Zoom, Netherlands
- Education: The Royal College of Art; Gerrit Rietveld Academy
- Occupation: Solar designer
- Notable work: The Energy Collection; Well Proven Chair; Current Table; Current Window; Cyanometer; Sunne; Ra
- Movement: Solar Movement
- Awards: Life Enhancer of the Year award, Wallpaper* Design Awards, 2022; Sustainable Construction Project of the year, The Netherlands Pavilion, Expo, 2021; Lighting Design of the Year, Dezeen, 2021; Innovation Award, ARC21, 2021; Public Vote Design Award, Dezeen, 2021; ECO coin Award, Next Nature Network, 2020; Public Award, Dutch Design Award, 2019; Climate Action Challenge, What Design Can Do, 2018; Designer of the Future, Swarovksi, 2017; Product Innovation Award, WIRED Audi Innovation Awards, 2016; Radicale Vernieuwer (Radical Pioneer) by Neelie Kroes, 2016; Emerging Talent Medal, London Design Festival, 2015; ARC chair Award, 2014, First Prize Dutch Material Award, 2012
- Website: marjanvanaubel.com

Marjan van Aubel (born in 1985) is a Dutch solar designer based in Amsterdam, the Netherlands.

== Education ==
Van Aubel graduated from the Gerrit Rietveld Academy's DesignLAB with a BA in 2009, and subsequently earned a master's degree in Product Design from the Royal College of Art in 2012.

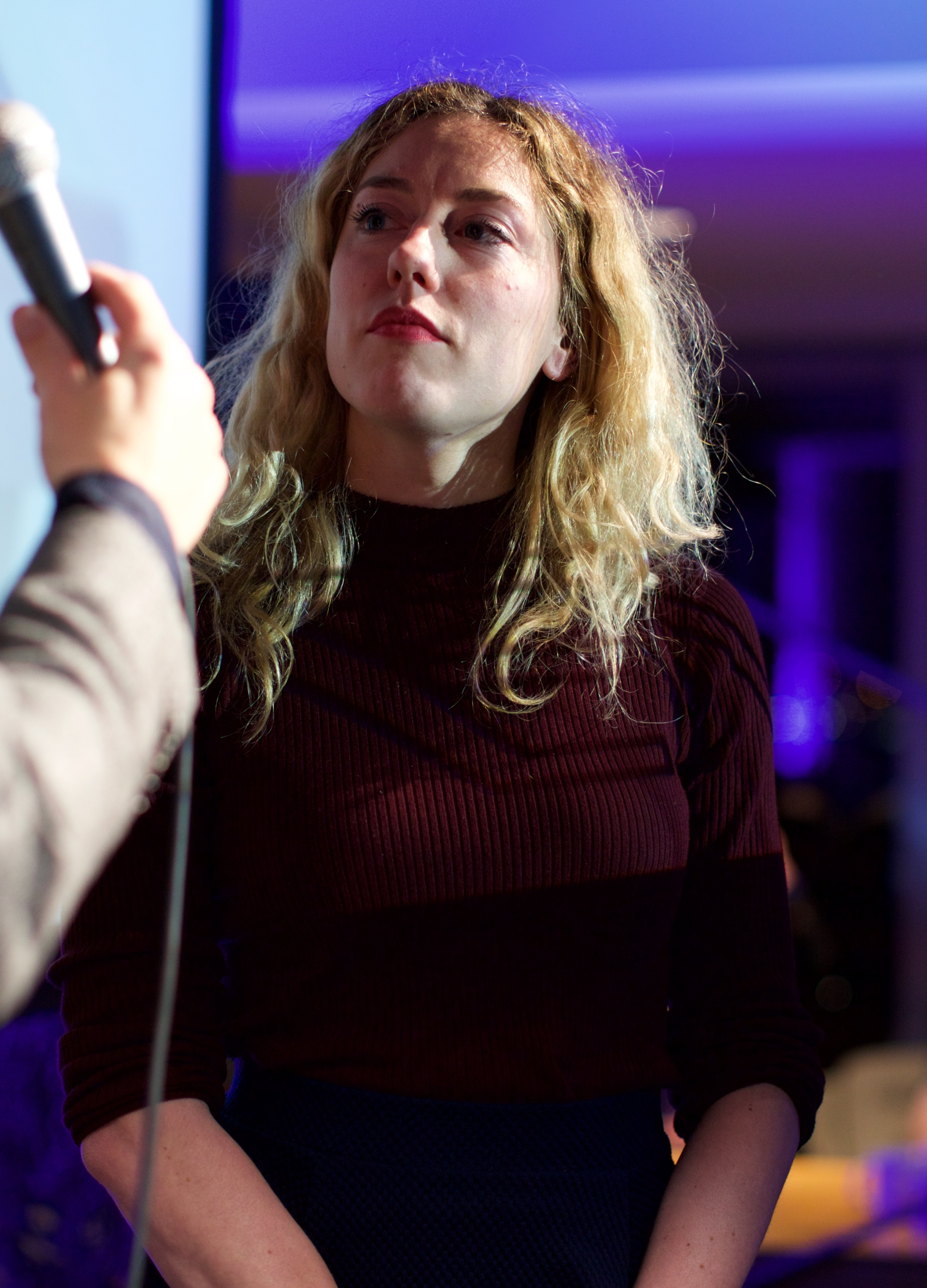
Nacht van de Radicale Vernieuwing

== Career and awards ==
Most of van Aubel's work involves incorporating solar cells into furniture, windows, and other objects. She has also designed a cover to maximize the surface area and thus the yield of a solar panel.

Her solar-powered table charger, Current Table, was included in the 2015 Design Museum Designs of the Year exhibition in London. In 2016 she won the 2015 Radicale Vernieuwer (radical renewer) award from the Dutch newspaper Vrij Nederland and also the Innovation in Product Design award at the first Wired Audi Innovation Awards, for Current Window, a stained glass window incorporating dye-sensitized solar cells. In 2017 she was one of three winners of the Designer of the Future award sponsored by Swarovski; tasked with using crystal, she incorporated portable solar cells within crystals to produce Cyanometer, a set of three objects that store ambient light as they are carried around during the day and also include LEDs to emulate the changing colors of the sky; at night they power a chandelier. Her solar-powered light, Sunne, won Wallpaper's Life Enhancer Of the Year Award in 2022 and Dezeen's Lighting Design of the Year in 2021.

Her Well Proven Stool (2014, with James Shaw) is in the collection of the Museum of Modern Art in New York and at the Vitra Design Museum. She was a participant in the 2016–2017 Dream Out Loud design exhibition at the Stedelijk Museum in Amsterdam.

In 2018 she was invited to talk on 'The Beautiful Future of Solar Power' at a TED (conference) in Amsterdam. In collaboration with V8 Architects she created a solar panel skylight for the Netherlands' pavilion at the Dubai Expo 2020 which won the Public Award.

In 2022, she founded the Solar Biennale at the Het Nieuwe Instituut with Dutch fashion designer Pauline van Dongen.

== Publications and further reading ==
- Aubel, Marjan van (2022). Solar Futures: How to Design a Post-Fossil World with the Sun. Prinsenbeek: Jap Sam Books. ISBN 978-94-92852-65-6. OCLC 1344291375.
- Proctor, Rebecca. The Sustainable Design Book. ISBN 978-1-78067-724-8.
