= William Guise =

English orientalist

William Guise (Gulielmus Guisius) (c.1653–1683), was an English orientalist.

== Life ==
He was the son of John Guise from a family originating at Elmore Court near Gloucester.

He went to Oriel College, Oxford, in 1669 at age 16. He graduated BA in 1674 and was then made a fellow of All Souls College, Oxford, from 1674 to 1680, being granted an MA in 1677. He spent the last years of his life in St Mary's College, Oxford.

He died of smallpox on 3 September 1683. His tomb in the college chancel of St Michael at the North Gate in Oxford was sculpted by William Bird.

== Family ==
His wife Frances Guise outlived him. They had a son John Guise and daughter Frances Guise.

== Works ==
He is known for his scholarly work on Zeraim, an order of the Mishnah, for which he produced a Latin translation and commentary. He made use of a wide range of Islamic literature, and particularly relied on the Arabic dictionaries of Fairuzabadi and Jauhari. It was published as Misnae Pars (1690), edited by Edward Bernard.
