= Wall's =

Wall's is formerly an ice cream and meat products brand in the UK, now split into two businesses:

- Wall's (ice cream), a brand owned by The Magnum Ice Cream Company
- Wall's (meat), a British sausage brand owned by Kerry Foods

== See also ==
- Walls (disambiguation)
- Wall (disambiguation)
