= William Bird (sculptor) =

English sculptor (1624–c.1691)

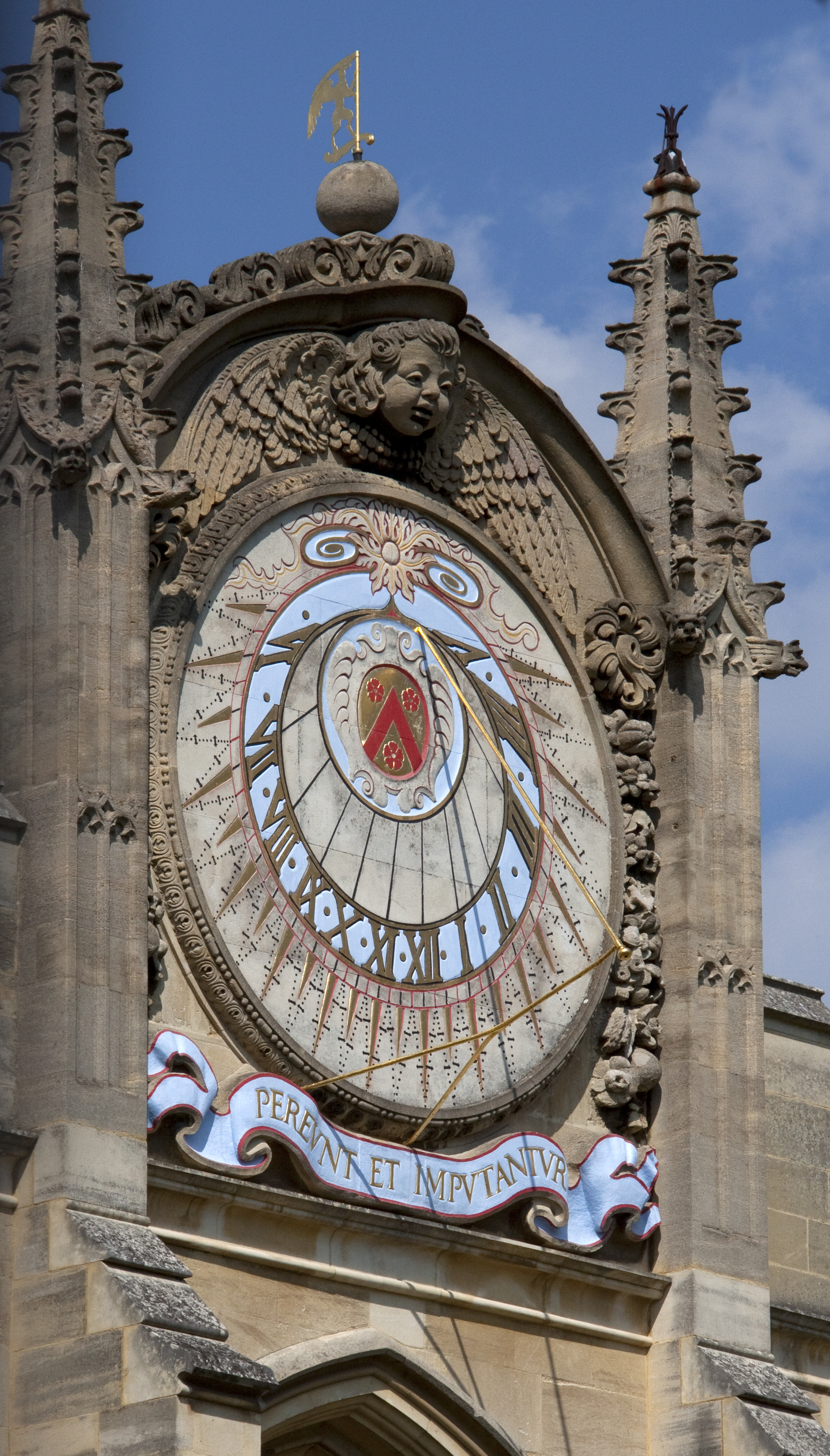
The huge sundial on All Souls College, Oxford

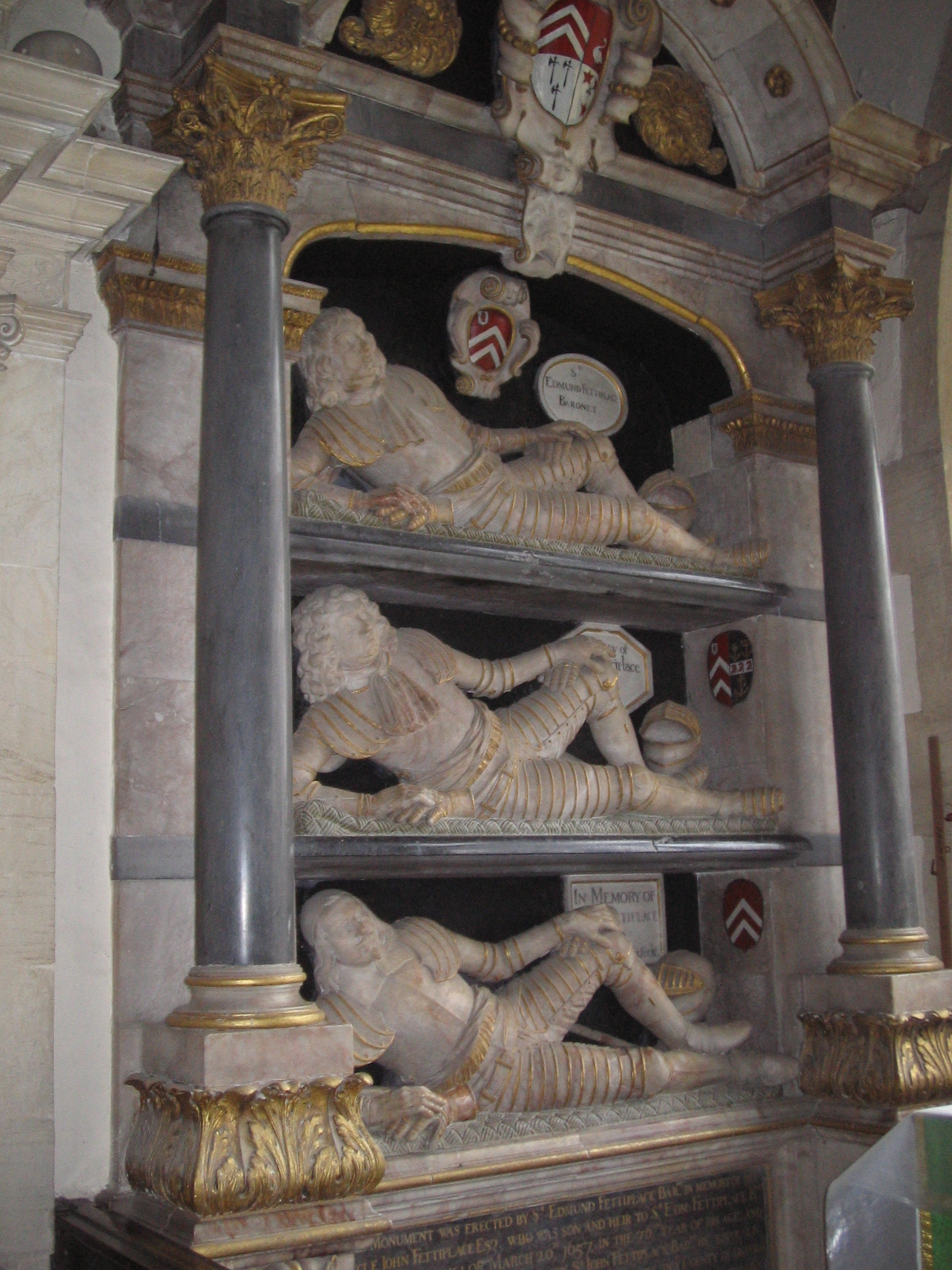
The Fettiplace monument in Swinbrook parish church

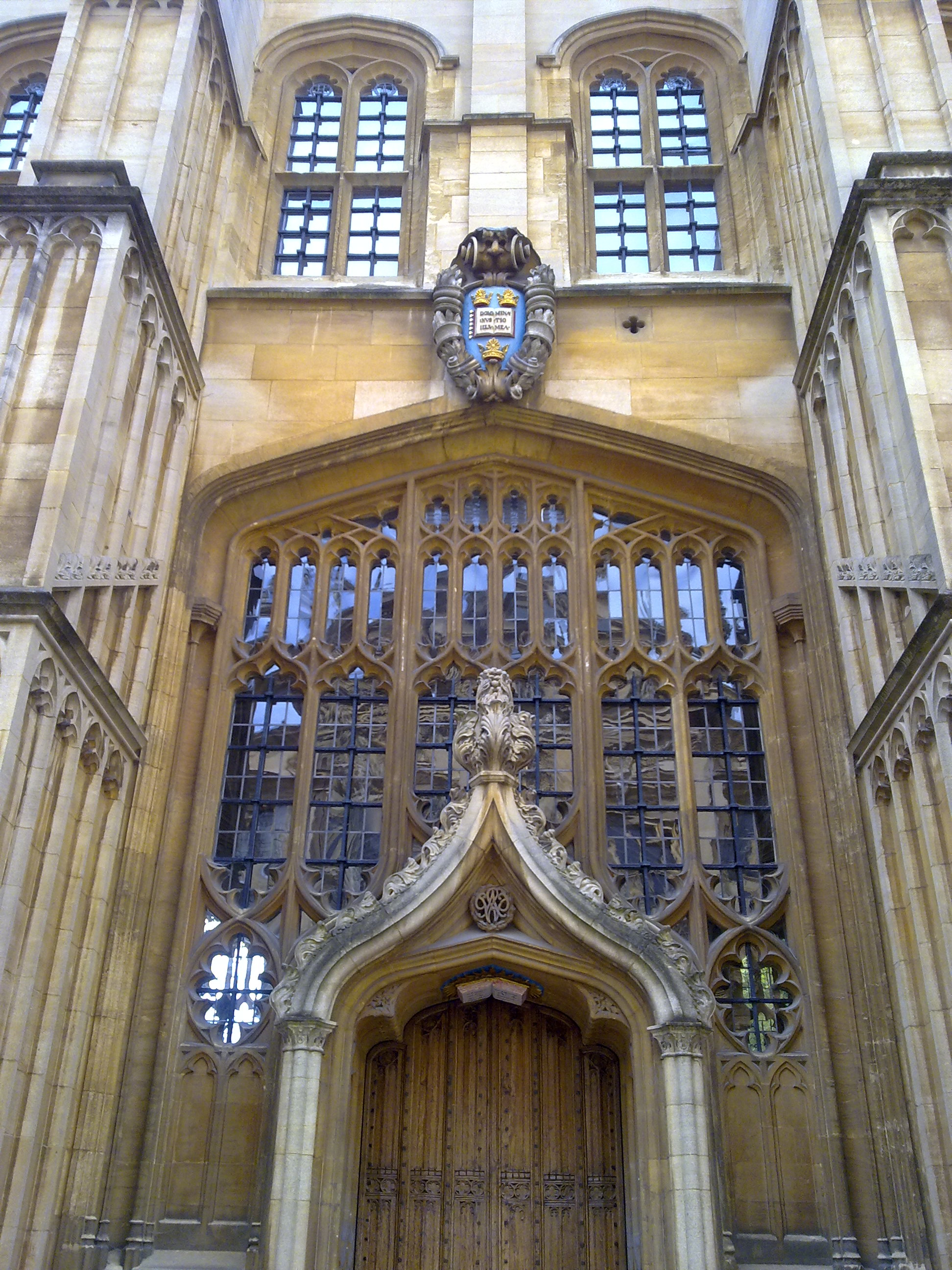
Doorway of the Divinity School in Oxford

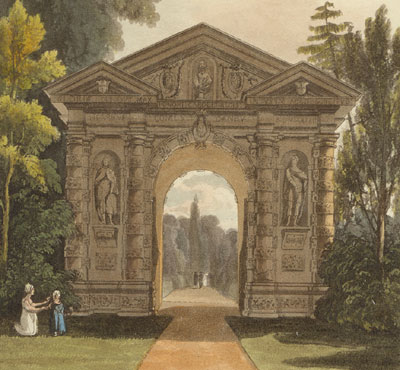
The Danby gateway to the Botanic Garden rebuilt c.1653

William Bird or Byrd (1624–c.1691) was a 17th century English sculptor. He seems to have served Oxford University for many decades as their official mason. His most notable work is the covered arch linking the two sections of New College, Oxford, raised over the centre of the carriageway to allow laden haycarts to pass.

For reason of social convention of the day he was classified as a master craftsman rather than as an artist, despite his considerable skill, the term artist being served mainly for painters in the upper classes creating free-standing pieces. Also in the convention of that time he received very poor payment for his work, which would have been at the same rate as other craftsmen, such as a blacksmith shoeing a horse.

== Life ==
Bird was born in May 1624 in St Nicholas' Parish in Gloucester and baptised in that church on 1 June 1624. He was the son of William Byrd of Hallywell or Holywell (d.1657) also a mason. He appears related by marriage to the London mason, Robert White, whose son was christened Simon Byrd White.

Around 1638 he was apprenticed to Walter Nicholls of Gloucester, becoming time-served after 8 years. He set up his own business around 1645 and from 1647 was mainly working in Oxford. Mason work was not in demand during the English Civil War and it seems possible (or even probable) that he took some part in the war in the 1640s on the Royalist side. His stoneyard was located between Wadham College and All Souls College. Christopher Wren attended both and attended this part of Oxford from 1651 to 1657. In his traversing of the city Wren must have certainly encountered, if not befriended, William Bird, and the two went on to collaborate on several projects of national importance.

Bird is first noted as paying tax on his yard in 1652 and was official college mason to Wadham College from at least 1656.

In 1658 he discovered the art of painting and staining marble. He presented his work to Kong Charles II on his visit to Oxford and to Cosmo, Prince of Tuscany in 1669.

By 1667 he was living in a tenement on the corner of Smith Street (on a site now occupied by Hertford College). He lived here with his wife, two children and two apprentices: Thomas Wood (1646-1695) and Richard Wood. Probably brothers Thomas rose to fame in his own right.

Despite his considerable skill, Bird typifies the under-valued tradesmen of his day and was only paid £2 per account for his magnificent work on the Sheldonian Theatre. Wren by comparison (not to belittle his clear talent) would receive several hundred pounds per account for the same period. Bird lived in comparative poverty for all his life, despite his skill as a tradesman.

From 1677 he was a church warden at St Peters Church in Oxford and later also did repairs on the church.

From 1679 Thomas Wood was independent but was brought in to help on projects including much of the work on the Ashmolean Museum on Bird's behalf.

In 1686 he was receiving £37 per month for his work at Winchester, but from this he had to pay 14 masons and 7 labourers under his employ. Due to various miscalculations or under-pricing for work, by December 1686 he was having to plead for more money from New College due to extreme poverty. His business skills therefore did not match his artistry. Rather than pay a requested £10 the college officials chose to terminate his contract.

The Peisley family took over as college masons in Oxford in 1692, by which date it can therefore be presumed that Bird had died. His house on Smith Street was occupied by the Piddington family (also masons) from 1692.

There is no record of his exact date of death but logically it can be placed in 1691. In the wider circumstances he is likely to be in an unmarked grave in Oxford, but his apprentice Wood may have created a stone.

== Family ==
He was married to Mary (d.1680) in or before 1652, and had a daughter Margaret in November of that year. He had one other daughter.

In 1673 Margaret married Richard Bache of London. Their son Byrd Bache died in infancy.

In 1687 Bird (aged 63), married Grace Keeble. They had a son John Bird in 1689.

== Most notable works ==
- Repair to the Royal coat of arms and statues of Charles I and Charles II on the Danby Gate at the Physic Garden (1653)
- Magnificent Sundial for All Souls College, Oxford (1659)
- Restoration of the tomb of William of Wykeham in Winchester Cathedral (1664)
- Model for Sheldonian Theatre for Wren (1664)
- Royal Arms on the Canons Lodging, Christ Church, Oxford for Dean John Fell (1665)
- Fireplace at Great Haseley Manor (c.1665) for William Lenthall
- External carving on Sheldonian Theatre in Oxford (1665/6) to a design by Christopher Wren
- Heads of emperors and philosophers surrounding Sheldonian Theatre in Oxford (1667) many replaced in 1960s
- Memorial to John Wall in Christ Church, Oxford (1668)
- Extensive repairs and inscriptions added to the Arundel marbles for Lord Thomas Howard (1668)
- Doorway of the Divinity School in Oxford (1669) to a design by Christopher Wren
- Serpent fountain at Christ Church, Oxford for Dr Richard Gardner (1670) serpent replaced by a figure of Mercury in 1695
- The archway at New College, Oxford (c.1670)
- Repairs and upgrading of Wadham College (1670-1675)
- Repairs and upgrading of New College (1671-1675)
- The Chapel at St. Edmund's Hall, Oxford (c.1675)
- Senior Common Room of New College (1676–77)
- Monument to Lady Barbara Horde in St Mary's Church Bampton (c.1676)
- Tomb of Ralph Brideoake, Bishop of Chichester in St. George's Chapel, Windsor Castle (1678)
- Tomb of Major Dunch, father of Wharton Dunch MP in Pusey, Oxfordshire (1679)
- Tomb of Sir Charles Pleydel of Midge Hall (1679)
- Ornamentation on the Ashmolean Museum, Oxford including royal coat-of-arms (1679-1682)
- South and north blocks of Garden Quadrangle, New College, Oxford (1682–84)
- Memorial to William Guise in St Michael's Church, Oxford (1683)
- Ornamentation on Winchester Palace recurving frontage (1683-1685) for Christopher Wren
- Monument to William Wilmot in Wantage (1684)
- Tomb of Sir John Knight at Chawton (1684)
- Monument to Samuel Sandys in Ombersley (1685)
- Tomb for the Fettiplace family in Swinbrook (1686)
- Harcourt family monument at Stanton Harcourt (1688)
- Lucy family monument at Brecon (DNK)
- Blake family monument in Cogges (DNK)
- Wenman family monument in Witney (DNK)
- Phillips monument in St Mary's Church in Bampton (DNK)
- Cheeke tablet in Corpus Christi Cloisters (DNK)
- Noyes floor slab New College Cloisters (DNK)
- Fynmore monument in North Hinksey (DNK)
