= Van der Wal =

Van der Wal (or van de Wal, Vander Wal, Vanderwal, van de Wall, VanderWaal) is a toponymic surname of Dutch origin. The name most likely means someone who lived in the vicinity of the Waal (river) in the Netherlands, a branch of the Rhine. A less likely explanation is the original bearer of the name may have lived or worked at or near a "wal": a river embankment, quay, or rampart. In 2007, Van de(r) Wal was the 47th most common surname in the Netherlands (15,646 people). In Belgium, the form Van de Walle is more abundant.

== List ==
People with the name Van de(r) Wal include:

- Christianne van der Wal (born 1973), Dutch politician
- Dolf van der Wal (born 1985), Dutch snowboarder
- Eelke van der Wal (born 1981), Dutch road cyclist
- Foske Tamar van der Wal (born 1986), Dutch speed skater
- Frederique van der Wal (born 1967), Dutch fashion model
- Gerrit van der Wal, Dutch president of KLM from 1965 to 1973
- Grace VanderWaal (born 2004), American singer-songwriter
- Henk van der Wal (1886–1982), Dutch Olympic runner
- Ian Vander-Wal (born 1971), Australian Olympic swimmer
- Jan Jaap van der Wal (born 1979), Dutch stand-up comedian
- Jannes van der Wal (1956–1996), Dutch/Frisian draughts (checkers) world champion
- Johanna Carolina van der Wal (1852–1908), Dutch-Indonesian pianist
- John Vander Wal (born 1966), American baseball player
- Kody Vanderwal (born 2001), American stock car driver
- Laurel van der Wal (1924–2009), American aeronautical engineer
- Marian van de Wal (born 1970), Dutch singer residing in Andorra
- Marieke van der Wal (born 1979), Dutch handball goalkeeper
- Nick van de Wall (born 1987), Dutch DJ better known as Afrojack
- Rachael Vanderwal (born 1983), British basketball player
- Rence van der Wal (born 1989), Dutch footballer
- Ron Vanderwal (born 1938), American-Australian anthropologist and archeologist
- Thomas Vander Wal (born 1966), American information architect

== See also ==
- Van der Waals (disambiguation)
- Van de Walle
- Wal (disambiguation)
