= Van de Walle =

Van de Walle is a Dutch language toponymic surname of Flemish origin, meaning "from the river embankment, quay, or rampart". In West Flanders the name is more common in concatenated forms like Vande Walle and VandeWalle. In the Netherlands the form Van der Wal is most common.

== List ==
People with this name include:

- Adelbert Van de Walle (1922–2006), Belgian architect, art historian and professor
- Chris G. Van de Walle, Belgian/American material scientist and electrical engineer
- Domingo Van de Walle de Cervellón (1720–1776), Spanish explorer and military commander
- Eduard Van De Walle (1932–2016), Belgian singer known as Eddy Wally
- Geert Van de Walle (1964–1988), Belgian road cyclist
- Gerald W. VandeWalle (born 1933), American Chief Justice of the North Dakota Supreme Court
- Johan Vandewalle (born 1960), Belgian philologist and civil engineer.
- Jurgen Van De Walle (born 1977), Belgian road cyclist
- Kristof Vandewalle (born 1985), Belgian road cyclist
- Philippe Vande Walle (born 1961), Belgian footballer
- Robert Van de Walle (born 1954), Belgian Olympic judoka
- Walter van de Walle (1922–2011), Canadian politician
- Willy Vande Walle (born 1949), Belgian academic, author, sinologist and Japanologist
- Yves Vandewalle (born 1950), French member of the National Assembly of France

== See also ==
- Van der Wal
- Walle (name)
