= Waal =

Waal may refer to:

== Places ==
- Waal, Bavaria, a town in Germany
- Waal, South Holland, a hamlet in the Dutch province of South Holland
- Waal (river), a Rhine distributary in the Netherlands
- Waaltje, formally the Waal, a dammed river in the Netherlands

== People with surname Waal ==
- Kadhim Waal (1951–2017), Iraqi footballer
- Giovanni Waal (born 1989), Surinamese footballer
- Nic Waal (1905–1960), Norwegian psychiatrist
- Willemijn Waal (born 1975), Dutch Hittitologist and Classicist.

== Other uses ==
- Waal (ship, 1959), a former Dutch ferry now known as Tanja
- WAAL, a classic rock FM radio station licensed to Binghamton, New York

== See also ==
- De Waal, a village in the Dutch province of North Holland
- De Waal (surname)
- Van der Waal (disambiguation)
- Wal (disambiguation)
- Wahl (disambiguation)
- WHAL (disambiguation)
- Wall (disambiguation)
