= Walch =

Walch is a surname. Notable people with the surname include:

- Gudrun Schaich-Walch (born 1946), German politician
- Andreas Walch (1824–1896), Liechtenstein soldier
- Clemens Walch (born 1987), Austrian footballer
- Christian Wilhelm Franz Walch (1726–1784), German theologian
- Dieter Walch (1940–2021), Liechtenstein paediatrician and politician
- Ernst Walch (born 1956), Liechtenstein politician
- Garnet Walch (1843–1913), Australian writer
- Hynden Walch, American actress
- James Walch, founder of J. Walch and Sons, Australian publisher
- Johann Ernst Immanuel Walch (1725–1778), German theologian
- Johann Georg Walch (1693–1775), German theologian
- Johann Heinrich Walch (1776–1855), German conductor and composer
- Megan Walch (born 1967), Australian artist
- Siegfried Walch (born 1984), German politician

== Other ==
- Walch Firearms & Co., a firearms manufacturer who created the Walch Revolver

== See also ==
- Walsh (disambiguation)
- Welch (disambiguation)
- Walcher (disambiguation)
- Walker (disambiguation)
