= Hill Creek =

Stream in Oregon, U.S.

Coordinates: 42°08′45″N 122°36′58″W

Hill Creek is a stream in the U.S. state of Oregon. It empties into Emigrant Lake.

Hill Creek was named after one Isaac Hill.
