= Van der Waals =

Van der Waals or Van der Waal may refer to:

== People ==
- Fransje van der Waals (born 1950), Dutch medical physician
- Grace VanderWaal (born 2004), American singer-songwriter
- Henk van der Waal (born 1960), Dutch poet
- Joan van der Waals (1920–2022), Dutch physicist
- Johannes Diderik van der Waals (1837–1923), Dutch physicist
- Leen van der Waal (1928–2020), Dutch politician
- Anton van der Waals (1912–1950), Dutch spy in German service during World War II

== Fictional characters ==
- Mona Vanderwaal, Pretty Little Liars character

== See also ==
- Van der Waals force
- Van der Wal, surname
- Henri van de Waal (1910–1972), Dutch writer and art historian
