= Wal Warren =

Australian rules footballer

Personal information
- Full name: Walter Herbert Warren
- Born: 25 June 1876; Bendigo, Victoria
- Died: 8 July 1942 (aged 66); Ivanhoe, Victoria
- Original team: Casterton

Playing career^{1}
Years	Club	Games (Goals)
1907	Melbourne	1 (0)
- ^{1} Playing statistics correct to the end of 1907.

Walter Herbert Warren (25 June 1876 – 8 July 1942) was an Australian rules footballer who played with Melbourne in the Victorian Football League (VFL).
