= Walle =

Walle is a surname of Norwegian and German origin, which is a variant of the surname Wall. Wall in turn is a topographic name, which meant a person who lived by a defensive or stone-built wall. The name Walle may refer to:

- Armando Walle (born 1978), American politician
- August Walle-Hansen (1877–1964), Norwegian businessman
- Brianna Walle (born 1984), American cyclist
- Hans Jørgen Walle-Hansen (1912–2012), Norwegian businessman
- Margot Walle (1921–1990), Norwegian pair skater

== Other uses ==
- Walle (Winsen), a village in Germany
- Walle Plough, a 4,000 year old plough
- Walle, an urban district in Bremen, Germany

== See also ==
- Van de Walle
- Wall (surname)
- WALL-E, a 2008 animated Pixar film
