= WALS (disambiguation) =

WALS is an American radio station that broadcasts country music. It may also refer to:

- ICAO code for the former Temindung Airport, Samarinda, Indonesia
- West African Linguistic Society, a scholarly society focused on West African languages and literature
- Western Aboriginal Legal Service, a community legal centre serving western New South Wales, Australia
- World Atlas of Language Structures, a database of structural properties of languages
