= Walle Plough =

Archeological find in northern Germany

Coordinates: 53°29′25″N 7°26′33″E

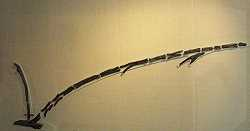
The Walle Plough

The Walle Plough (German: Pflug von Walle) is an ancient plough discovered in 1927 by peat cutters outside Walle, near Aurich, East Frisia (Germany). It is one of the oldest known ploughs found in Europe.

== Location and discovery ==
The plough was discovered on 9 July 1927 by Jann Hanßen and his son Heye at the bottom edge of a 1.7-metre (5 ft 7 in) deep layer of peat. As a reward, Hanßen received 50 ℛ︁ℳ︁, which he had to share with the landowner, a man called Weinstock.

== Extent of excavation ==
The ploughbeam is made from a single oak branch approximately 3 metres (9.8 ft) long. The ploughshare originally measured about 60 centimetres (24 in). The handle is set in a rectangular opening of the share and stabilised by additional wedges. The front part of the share is missing, because the plough had been accidentally cut into several pieces by its finders.

Pollen samples were taken in 1927 for palynological analysis. This showed that the plough dates to the Early Bronze Age at the earliest. Since it represents a fairly developed form of the scratch plough, the Walle find could also date to the later Bronze Age or Early Iron Age.

A similar plough, also of oak and of similar measurements, was found at Papau near Toruń. The scratch plough type is known through finds and images from the Neolithic, the Bronze and Iron Ages, as well as from Hallstatt culture, Etruscan, Greek, and Roman contexts. The basic form is still in use in the Mediterranean region.

Why the Walle Plough had been deposited in a bog is not known. Perhaps it was meant to be temporarily sunk in the bog during the winter, to preserve its wood. In 1983, a roughly 3000-year-old stone axe was found nearby.

== Date ==
After the plough had begun to physically deteriorate around 1937, it was brought to the Lower Saxony State Museum at Hanover for conservation. It is still on display there. The examination of pollen and peat samples indicated that the plough could not be allocated to any period with certainty. Originally it had been estimated to be from the 4th millennium BC, but in the 1950s this was revised to a date around 2000 BC.

A replica of the plough is on display in the Historical Museum at Aurich. At Walle, a stone marks the findspot.

== Literature ==
- Karl-Ernst Behre / Hajo van Lengen: Ostfriesland. Geschichte und Gestalt einer Kulturlandschaft. Aurich 1995, ISBN 3-925365-85-0
