= Brad Walls =

Australian aerial photographer (born 1992)

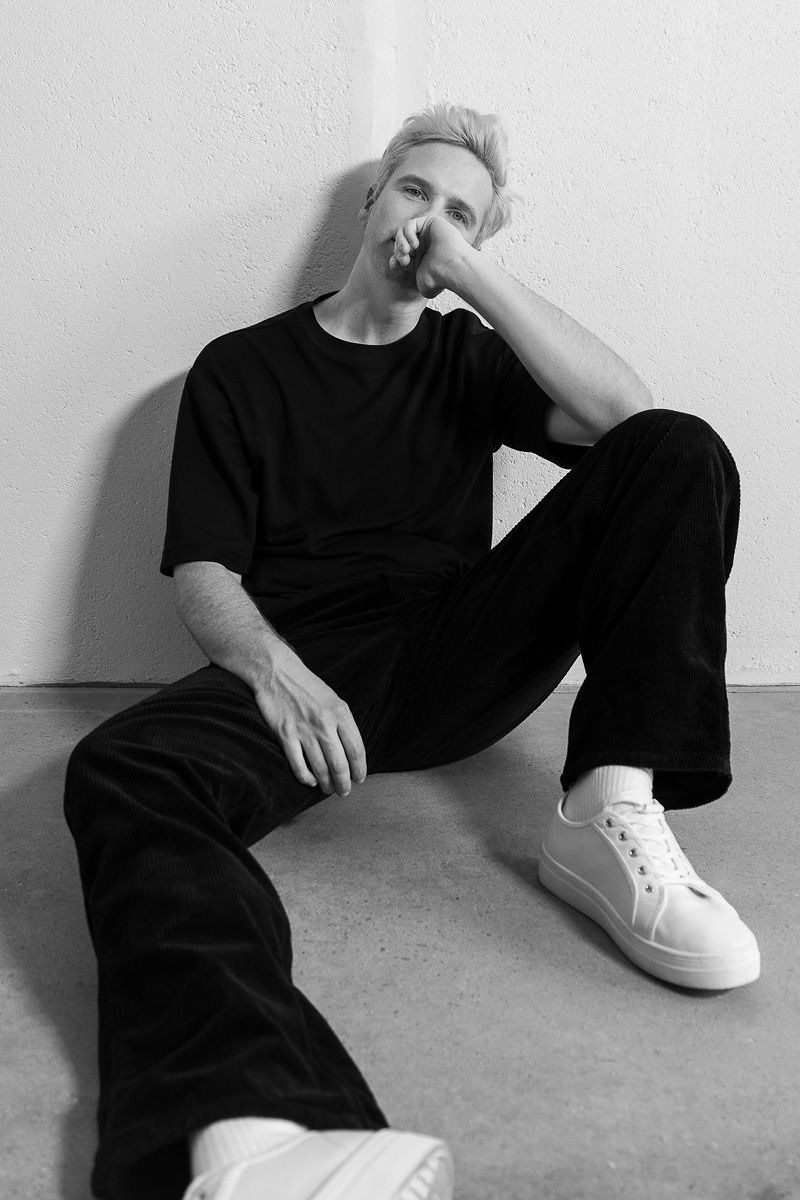
- Born: 11 August 1992 (age 33); Sydney, Australia
- Education: University of Sydney
- Occupation: Fine-art photographer
- Years active: 2019–present
- Website: bradscanvas.com

Brad Walls (born 1992) is an Australian fine art aerial photographer, best known for his collection Pools from Above.

== Biography ==
Walls was born in 1992 in Sydney, Australia. Walls's artworks have appeared in magazines such as The Washington Post, CNN and The Guardian. He is currently based in New York City.

== Style ==
Walls' works showcase architecture, public spaces, and people from above. His photography practice began in 2018 after he purchased a drone and started photographing images that would become the Pools from above series. The Guardian has described his work as exploring the "beauty in the minimalist shapes, colours and textures" from above the subject. Walls prefers working with lines and geometry, experimenting with standard design principles including negative space and symmetry to bring out subjects' features. CNN describes his post-production process: "Walls will crop the shots in a specific way to create a different visual look". Aesthetica explores Walls' attention to detail in his Pools from Above series "immediately struck by the tiled steps, patterned surfaces and decoration". The photographer has a keen interest on people within his work to showcase an alternate viewpoint which is unseen by the naked eye.

Reviews of Walls' maiden Book 'Pools From Above' were mostly positive with David Jenkins from The Times commenting "Walls has taken his drones to California, Mexico, Australia and beyond to explore 'negative space and compositional balance'. There is that, in spades, but there’s also seductive riffing on colour, ripples, emptiness and possibility – David Hockney is not the only poet of the swimming pool".

== Awards ==
- Siena International Photo Awards - Drone Photo Awards (runner-up)
- Aerial Photo Awards - Sport & People

== Books ==
- Brad Walls (2022). Pools from Above. Rizzoli. ISBN 1925811972
- Kazimirski, Florian; Raab, Josefine (2022). Minimalism in photography : the original. Augsburg, Germany: teNeues Publishing Company. ISBN 978-3-96171-414-8. OCLC 1338666926.
- Ponderings Anthology Second Edition, Ponderings Australia, 2020, ISBN 978-0-64503-091-4
