= The Wall (Bhatia novel) =

2020 Indian speculative fiction novel by Gautam Bhatia

- Author: Gautam Bhatia
- Language: English
- Series: Chronicles of Sumer
- Genre: Speculative fiction, dystopian fiction, science fiction
- Publisher: HarperCollins India
- Publication date: 13 August 2020
- Publication place: India
- Media type: Print (paperback), e-book
- Pages: 385 (first edition)
- ISBN: 9789353578350
- Followed by: The Horizon (2021)

The Wall is a 2020 speculative fiction novel by Indian author and legal scholar Gautam Bhatia. Published by HarperCollins India, it is Bhatia's debut novel and the first instalment of the Chronicles of Sumer duology, followed by The Horizon (2021). Combining elements of science fiction and fantasy, the book explores themes of freedom, isolation, class hierarchy, and social resistance. Set in the ringed city of Sumer, the story centres on a society completely enclosed by a massive, impenetrable Wall that has isolated its citizens from the outside world for over two thousand years. The plot follows Mithila, a young revolutionary, and her companions as they attempt to break through the physical and societal barriers that confine them.

== Plot summary ==
The city of Sumer is bounded by an unscalable, impenetrable Wall that extends far into the sky and deep underground, completely encapsulating its inhabitants. For over two thousand years, the residents of Sumer have lived within this enclosed ecosystem, accepting the Wall as the natural limit of their world and having no concept of a horizon or the world beyond it. According to city legend, the Wall was erected by mythical beings known as the Builders as punishment after an ancient figure named Malan crossed a forbidden boundary.

Society within Sumer is organized into fifteen concentric residential circles, bisected by a river and governed by a rigid, hereditary caste system called the Mandalas, which dictates labour, movement, and access to resources such as rare indigo dye. Political authority is shared among three dominant institutions: the Council, a nominally elected body that functions in practice as an aristocracy dominated by a small elite; the Select, a scientific institution; and the Shoortans, a religious order that enforces devotion to the Wall, records history in a sacred Black Book, and teaches that the Wall is a divine punishment that will only vanish once the population atones for its original sin.

Despite centuries of enforced stability, a persistent yearning for freedom — known as smara — has periodically inspired attempts to breach the Wall. In the present generation, this desire finds expression in the Young Tarafians, a small group of friends named after the historical revolutionary poet Taraf, who imagined a world beyond the barrier. The group is led by Mithila, a young singer-in-training from the Seventh Circle, dissatisfied with Sumer's stagnant society and inspired by earlier reformers, including her late brother Garuda and generations of dissidents who challenged the city's accepted beliefs. In one early attempt, group member Alvar digs into an underground pit at the edge of the city, only to discover that the Wall extends endlessly into the earth.

As the Young Tarafians work to awaken the public's desire for a horizon, Sumer is already under strain from crop failures, religious schisms, elite infighting, and unexplained portents in the sky. The group's investigations into the city's suppressed history uncover competing accounts of who built the Wall, why, and what future is possible for Sumer, sparking a broader ideological battle between defenders of the old order and those seeking change. Their activities provoke fierce opposition from the Shoortans and the Council, who regard any attempt to breach the Wall as heresy, while other figures across the city pursue their own paths toward transformation through scientific inquiry, constitutional reform, or reinterpretations of Sumer's past.

The conflict culminates in the public trial of Mithila before the city's ruling troika. High Priest Rastogi of the Shoortans defends the necessity of the Wall and the preservation of tradition, while Mithila argues that a life without a horizon stifles human growth and perpetuates oppressive social cycles. The confrontation raises fundamental questions about the legitimacy of Sumer's institutions and whether the human desire for freedom can justify abandoning the security that has defined the city for two thousand years. The novel closes by setting the stage for its sequel, The Horizon.

== Characters ==
Mithila: The novel's protagonist, Mithila is a singer-in-training from the Seventh Circle and the eloquent leader of the Young Tarafians. Driven by smara to discover what lies beyond the Wall, she rejects the complacency of Sumerian society and challenges the political, religious, and social structures that sustain the city's isolation, seeking to breach the Wall and restore a horizon to humanity.

Rama: The daughter of a Council Elder and Mithila's romantic partner. Their same-sex relationship is portrayed as an accepted "pure union" within Sumerian society, providing an emotional counterpoint to Mithila's political struggle.

Garuda: Mithila's elder brother and a former revolutionary whose earlier attempts to challenge the Wall influence her own determination. Although absent for much of the narrative, his legacy continues to shape the actions of the Young Tarafians and is closely tied to the city's deeper political and historical conflicts.

The Shoortans: A religious order that acts as guardians of the Wall's sanctity, promoting a single origin myth about the Builders to justify the city's isolation and opposing any attempt to approach or breach the Wall.

High Priest Rastogi: The leader of the Shoortans and guardian of the Black Book, Rastogi is Mithila's principal ideological opponent. He defends the belief that the Wall is sacred, arguing that it represents divine protection and social order, and that any attempt to cross it threatens both Sumer's history and identity.

Sanchika: A progressive Council Elder who advocates social and economic reforms, including changes to Sumer's system of land ownership to reduce economic inequality, representing political reform from within the existing institutions.

Marwana: The leader of the Select, Sumer's scientific institution, Marwana advocates for scientific inquiry and rational investigation over religious dogma, often placing the Select in conflict with the religious authority of the Shoortans.

Tefnakth: The leader of the Coterie, a dissident faction within the Shoortans. He opposes the consolidation of Sumer's diverse city mythologies into a single rigid religious text, challenging the orthodox interpretation of Sumeran traditions and reflecting internal divisions within the priesthood.

Lamon: A citizen who attempts to breach Sumer's rigid caste system for love, balancing personal desire with societal duty.

Minakshi: Mithila's sister, whose storyline centers on family obligation, survival, and the everyday realities of life within Sumer, providing a perspective distinct from Mithila's revolutionary ambitions.

Alvar, Shali, Chandra, and Mankala: Fellow members of the Young Tarafians who join Mithila's meetings and debates over Sumer's suppressed history and the philosophy of imagining a "horizon" beyond the Wall.

Taraf: A revolutionary poet and scholar whose writings envisioned a world beyond the Wall and inspired the Young Tarafians. Although long dead before the events of the novel, his ideas remain central to the movement challenging Sumer's established order.

Malan: A semi-mythological figure from Sumerian lore whose ancient transgression allegedly led to the creation of the Wall.

== Themes ==
=== Political authority ===
Critics have read The Wall as an allegory of authoritarian governance, with the Wall functioning both as a defensive structure and a mechanism of ideological control that legitimises itself through narratives of security and manufactured consensus. The plot advances through council debates, oratory, and legal argument rather than conventional action, contrasting the dogmatic Shoortans, a religious order guarding the Wall, with secular institutions like the Council of Elders and the Select, a scientific body. Reviewers have framed this as a constitutional allegory illuminating the "hidden plumbing" of legal structures, with parallels to Indian debates on religious orthodoxy and free speech.

=== Freedom, confinement, and smara ===
The miles-high Wall enclosing Sumer protects inhabitants from unknown dangers while restricting curiosity, mobility, and change. This tension is embodied in smara, a collective, half-suppressed longing for a horizon no Sumerian has seen. The novel suggests that long-term confinement trades liberty for safety, producing stagnation and asking whether stability through isolation becomes its own imprisonment.

=== History, memory, and language ===
The narrative turns on the conflict between oral tradition and codified history. Shoortans enforce a canonical origin text, the Black Book, while the Young Tarafians preserve alternative accounts through oral poetry and song. This plays out through the opposing claims of protagonist Mithila and high priest Rastogi over whether history should be oral or textual. Language itself becomes a tool of liberation, as characters argue that a bounded world limits vocabulary, so imagining life beyond the Wall requires imagining new language.

=== Identity, caste, and hierarchy ===
Sumer's concentric rings, or mandalas, see privilege decrease outward toward the peripheral slums, or Dooma, drawing critical comparisons to the Indian caste system. Finite resources justify strict marriage laws restricting inter-circle unions, while same-sex relationships are venerated as "pure unions" for being non-procreative. This regulated order shapes work, family, and political life, letting the novel critique inherited hierarchy while examining identity under institutional control.

=== Influences ===
Reviewers have situated The Wall within a lineage of philosophical and literary influences, including Plato's Allegory of the Cave and the legend of Icarus. The novel has been positioned as a deliberate descendant of and response to Ursula K. Le Guin's The Dispossessed, with critics arguing that where Le Guin's novel wrestles with revolution, Bhatia's wrestles with memory and the politics of history-writing. Other identified influences include Theodore Cogswell's short story "The Wall Around the World" and China Miéville's The City & The City.

== Publication ==
The Wall is the debut speculative fiction novel by Indian legal scholar, writer, and editor Gautam Bhatia, published by HarperCollins India on 13 August 2020. It marked Bhatia's first work of fiction following his academic writings on constitutional law, and critics have noted its close thematic continuity with his non-fiction legal work, including Offend, Shock, Disturb! and The Transformative Constitution.

The novel is the first instalment of a planned duology titled The Chronicles of Sumer, followed by The Horizon in 2021. It was released in paperback in India and later received international distribution.

== Reception ==
The Wall received widespread critical acclaim from both Indian national media and international speculative fiction venues. Critics broadly praised its intricate worldbuilding, political depth, and philosophical engagement with themes of liberty, boundaries, and governance.

Writing for The Hindu, Jaideep Unudurti characterized Bhatia’s "law-centric approach" as an exciting new direction for Indian science fiction, describing the book as an "X-ray" of its contemporary environment that engages with history, caste, and institutional decay. In Hindustan Times, Maaz Bin Bilal called the book an important allegorical addition to speculative fiction, situating it within the classical utopia-turned-dystopia tradition. Bilal commended its topical commentary on modern wall-building, authoritarian legalism, and social stratifications.

Critics in Mint Lounge (Shrabonti Bagchi) and The Leaflet commended the story's "pre-dystopian" setting, noting that its examination of how safety is deceptively prioritized over liberty serves as a mirror for contemporary political compromises. The Wire described the novel as a "deeply imagined, stylish and confident debut."

Scroll.in framed the novel as a form of "new realism" for pandemic-era readers, praising his empathetic choice to centre a lesbian protagonist and treat her sexuality as incidental rather than a point of conflict.

In Locus, Gary K. Wolfe called The Wall a "deeply intelligent and thoughtful intellectual adventure," praising its sophisticated political imagination and blend of allegory with detailed social worldbuilding.

Reviewing for Strange Horizons, Arpit Merchant lauded the novel's "quintessentially Indian" understanding of historical memory and oral tradition, its accessible prose, and its subversion of common speculative tropes — particularly through the natural, unforced integration of non-heteronormative relationships into Sumer's social architecture.

Writing for the BSFA Review, Dan Hartland described the book as a "wise, rich and surprising novel" governed by a deliberate circular geometry. Hartland highlighted its focus on "interior shift" and intellectual expansion rather than physical conflict, noting that internal shifts in thought and language are framed as equal to physical revolution. Similarly, John Folk-Williams of SciFi Mind called the novel a compelling blend of fantasy and fable, praising its incorporation of poetry, song, and language as tools for political imagination and rebellion.

While praising the novel’s intellectual ambition, several reviewers pointed out minor technical flaws typical of a debut novel. Both Avantika Mehta (Scroll.in) and Dan Hartland (The BSFA Review) observed an over-reliance on dialogue and exposition, noting that characters occasionally serve to "tell" the history and philosophy of Sumer rather than "show" it through action. Mehta also remarked that secondary characters were less fleshed out compared to the rich world-building and the central protagonist, Mithila. Nevertheless, Hartland noted that in a "novel of ideas," a heavy focus on philosophical discursiveness and dialogue remains an appropriate and fitting choice.

== Awards and recognition ==
- The Wall was featured on Locus Magazine's Recommended Reading List for Best Debut Novel (2021).
- It was shortlisted for the 2021 Valley of Words Award in the English Fiction category.

== Sequel ==
The Horizon, the second and concluding novel in the Sumer duology, was published by HarperCollins India on 10 November 2021. Picking up immediately after the events of The Wall, it follows the aftermath of the Wall's breach, detailing the social and political upheaval within Sumer while expanding the narrative beyond the city. Continuing Mithila's story, the novel concludes the exploration of revolution and freedom begun in The Wall and resolves many of the questions raised in the first novel.

== See also ==
- Indian science fiction
- Dystopian fiction
- Gautam Bhatia (lawyer)
