= Walls House =

Walls House may refer to:

- Walls Farm Barn and Corn Crib, Tomberlin, Arkansas, listed on the NRHP in Arkansas
- Walls House (Lonoke, Arkansas), listed on the NRHP in Arkansas
- James A. Walls House, Holly Grove, Arkansas, listed on the NRHP in Arkansas
