= Robert Wall (disambiguation) =

Robert Wall (1939–2022) American martial artist and screen actor.

Robert Wall may also refer to:

- Bob Wall (football administrator) (1912–1981), English former secretary and director of Arsenal Football Club
- Bob Wall (ice hockey) (born 1942), Canadian ice hockey player

== See also ==
- Robert Walls (born 1950), Australian rules footballer
