= Joseph Wall =

Joseph Wall may refer to:

- Joseph Wall (colonial administrator) (1737–1802), soldier, governor of Goree
- Joseph B. Wall (1847–1912), Florida state senator
- Joseph Frazier Wall (1920–1995), American historian
- Jobi Wall (Joseph Wall, born 1989), American basketball player
