= Vahlen =

Vahlen is a German surname. Notable people with the surname include:

- Johannes Vahlen (1830–1911), German philologist
- Theodor Vahlen (1869–1945), German mathematician, son of Johannes

== See also ==
- Valen (surname)
