= Waaler =

Waaler is a Norwegian surname. Notable people with the surname include:

- Carl Waaler Kaas (born 1982), Norwegian orienteering competitor
- Christian Waaler (born 1981), Norwegian bandy player
- Reidar Waaler (1894–1979), United States Army soldier
- Rolf Waaler (1898–2000), Norwegian economist
