= Pauline van Dongen =

Dutch fashion designer

- Born: 1986 (age 39–40); Amsterdam
- Education: PhD Eindhoven University of Technology, MA Fashion Institute Arnhem ArtEZ University of Arts
- Website: http://www.paulinevandongen.nl/

Pauline van Dongen (born 1986) is a Dutch fashion designer specialising in wearable technology.

== Life ==
In 2010, van Dongen established her own design studio, Pauline van Dongen Studio. The studio, located in Arnhem (the Netherlands) has collaborated with several high-profile companies such as the electronics giant Philips, to create light-up sportswear. By collaborating with technology companies, Pauline van Dongen Studio aims to use technology to add value to fashion.

She was named on the Forbes list of Europe's Top 50 Women in Tech 2018.

In 2022, she founded the Solar Biennale at the Het Nieuwe Instituut with Dutch solar designer Marjan van Aubel.
