= John Eshleman Wahl =

John Eshleman Wahl (November 16, 1933 – April 26, 2010) Civil Rights attorney; attorney for Harvey Milk.

Wahl was perhaps best known as the lawyer for Harvey Milk until Milk's murder. He was an important early influence on Milk, helping him focus on being heard outside the gay community. According to publisher Thomas E. Horn, as "Harvey was gearing up to run for supervisor, John was trying to keep him straight, so to speak." He also represented Oliver Sipple, who had been "outed" by Milk after saving the life of President Gerald Ford, in Sipple's suit for invasion of privacy against the newspapers who outed him.

Wahl's activities as a civil rights attorney were broader than his work with Milk. In 1971, Wahl obtained a landmark ruling from the United States Supreme Court, requiring prisons to provide prisoners with legal research materials for use in Habeas Corpus petitions and appeals. He also established a federal constitutional right for prisoners to have access to clergy of their choice, even when the correctional authority disapproved of the message of the church at issue.
