= Fransje van der Waals =

Dutch physician (born 1950)

Fransje van der Waals (born 1950 in Heemstede) is a Dutch medical physician and founder of the non-profit organisation Health[e]Foundation.

== Career ==
After her study at the Faculty of Medicine of the University of Amsterdam, Fransje received her MD degree in 1978 and her PhD from the same university in 1995. In 1981, she was board certified in the Netherlands as general practitioner. In 1987, she became assistant professor and head of the Women's Health Studies Department at the Academic Medical Center of the University of Amsterdam.

In the period 1979-2001, Fransje published over 40 articles in peer-reviewed journals and between 1983 and 1997 she also published five books on women's health issues. She also wrote medical columns in ELLE, Marie Claire and Santé magazines on a regular basis and has a weekly radio talk show on health-related subjects. During her entire career, van der Waals has remained active as a general practitioner and has been a partner in a general practice in the center of Amsterdam for almost 25 years.

As a physician she is used to educate her patients as well as teach and train healthcare personnel. She thus initiated Health[e]Foundation, a distance computer-based training program for healthcare workers in the developing world who are involved in the treatment and care of HIV/AIDS patients. A first pilot of the program was shown at the International AIDS Conference in Barcelona in 2002. From that moment on, things proceeded quickly. From a one-woman idea Health[e]Foundation became a leading educational organization on HIV healthcare.

Currently, her foundation has grown to an established organisation. Beside HIV[e]Education, TB[e]Education, Pediatric HIV[e]Education and Community[e]Education are developed and used in developing countries. More e learning programs are being developed, including bacteriology, malaria, reproductive health and a program for children to educate, train and empower healthcare workers all around the world. The concept of blended learning using e learning as well as onside workshops makes these training programs a success.

== Personal life ==
Fransje is married to Jaap Goudsmit and has three daughters. She currently lives in Amsterdam.
