= John Wall (priest and antiquarian) =

John Wall (1588–1666) was an English cleric.

== Life ==
Wall was born in 1588 'of genteel parents' in the city of London and educated at Westminster School. He went to Christ Church, Oxford, in 1604, graduating B.A. in 1608, M.A. in 1611, and B.D. in 1618.

In 1617 Wall was appointed vicar of St. Aldate's, Oxford, where he gained reputation as a preacher. In 1623 he received the degree of D.D.; in 1632 he was made canon of Christ Church, Oxford; in 1637 he was appointed to the living of Chalgrove; and in 1644 to a canonry at Salisbury Cathedral. He was also chaplain to Philip Stanhope, first earl of Chesterfield.

Wall was deprived of his canonry at Christ Church by the parliamentary visitors in March 1648, but was restored on his submission in the following September, and retained that and his canonry at Salisbury during the Commonwealth and Protectorate; he was also subdean and moderator of Christ Church. He died unmarried at Christ Church on 20 October 1666, and was buried in the cathedral.

Archbishop John Williams described Wall as "the best read" in the Church Fathers that he knew.' He subscribed to the rebuilding of Christ Church in 1660, and gave some books to Pembroke College Library.

A memorial tablet to "Johannis Wall" is in Christ Church, Oxford and was carved by William Bird of Oxford around 1668.

== Sermons ==
Many of Wall's sermons have been published in collections and separately, the most important being:

1. 'Watering of Apollo,' Oxford, 1625.
2. 'Jacob's Ladder,' Oxford, 1626.
3. 'Alæ Seraphicæ,' London, 1627.
4. 'Evangelical Spices,' London, 1627.
5. 'Christian Reconcilement,' Oxford, 1658.
6. 'Solomon in Solio,' Oxford, 1660.
