= Florian Wahl =

German politician (born 1984)

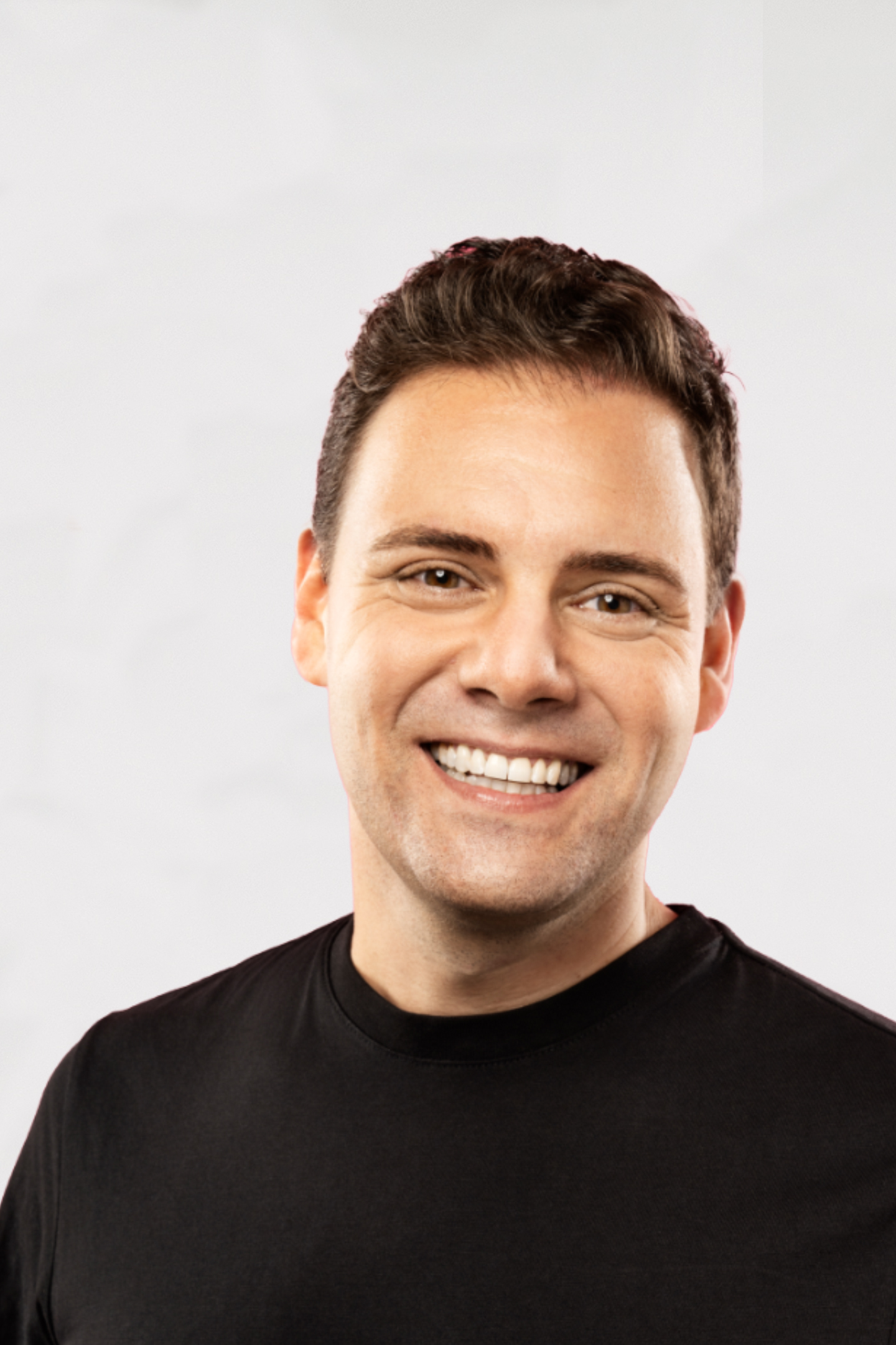
- Wahl in 2021

Member of the Landtag of Baden-Württemberg
- Incumbent
- Assumed office 11 May 2021
- Constituency: Böblingen
- In office 11 May 2011 – 11 May 2016
- Constituency: Böblingen

Personal details
- Born: 7 June 1984 (age 41)
- Party: Social Democratic Party (since 2002)

Florian Wahl (born 7 June 1984) is a German politician. He has been a member of the Landtag of Baden-Württemberg since 2021, having previously served from 2011 to 2016. He has served as chairman of the social affairs committee since 2021.
