= Erik Wahl =

American painter

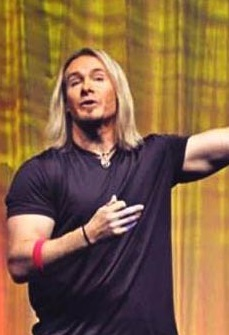
- Wahl in 2013
- Education: University of San Diego
- Occupations: Speaker, author, artist, entrepreneur
- Spouse: Tasha Wahl
- Website: theartofvision.com

Erik C. Wahl is an American graffiti artist, speed-painter, author, motivational speaker and entrepreneur based in San Diego. He owns The Wahl Group, a consultancy firm, and has spoken at conventions by Microsoft, Disney, and other corporations. Wahl makes paintings of thinkers, leaders and cultural icons such as Michael Jordan, Steve Jobs, and other celebrities during his presentations.

In 2011, Wahl created a 10,000 square-foot Mona Lisa in a desert near Los Angeles. The following year, he was selected by TED as a speaker for the TED2012: Full Spectrum series. Wahl wrote the book Unthink: Rediscover Your Creative Genius in 2013. Unthink was named CEO Reads book of the year in 2013. In 2014, Wahl was a featured speaker at the World Entrepreneur of the Year event hosted by Ernst & Young, as well as Entrepreneur's 2014 Growth Conference.

== Career ==
After graduating from University of San Diego with a bachelor's degree in business, Wahl became a partner at a corporate firm. He was there for eight years before losing his job during the dot-com bubble burst in the early 2000s. At the age of 30, Wahl decided to change his focus to art. He later founded his own company, The Wahl Group, with his wife Tasha Wahl.

Wahl began working as a motivational speaker and graffiti artist rather than returning to the corporate world. After a few years of painting and selling his work to buyers, Wahl decided to stop selling his art and instead only auction off his paintings for charities.

=== Presentations and speed-painting ===
As a public speaker, Wahl has performed his speed-art presentation called "The Art of Vision" for audiences including schools and universities, conferences, and large companies. Some of his clients include AT&T, London Business School, Ernst & Young, and XPrize

During his presentation, Wahl speaks about personal creativity while painting stylized portraits of iconic figures, leaders and cultural icons such as the Statue of Liberty and Albert Einstein.

In 2010, he performed at an IRS employee convention in Anaheim, California where he painted portraits of Michael Jordan and U2 singer Bono as a part of The Art of Vision. Three Wahl paintings were donated to the Combined Federal Campaign, a workplace charity program.

In 2011, Wahl created a 10,000 square-foot Mona Lisa in a desert near Los Angeles in three days using dirt and rocks.

Wahl was featured in a TED presentation for the TED2012: Full Spectrum series after being selected as a finalist for the program in 2011. Also in 2012, he delivered a live art performance to pay tribute to director Gus Van Sant at the 11th Annual San Diego Film Festival in La Jolla, California.

Wahl was the keynote speaker at the Lectora User Conference in 2012 in Chicago and again in 2013 in San Antonio. In 2014, he presented at Entrepreneur's Growth Conference in New Orleans. He created a graffiti-style painting of Magic Johnson and was a keynote speaker at the UltiConnect Conference in March 2015. Wahl also spoke at the LEAD2015 Global Leadership Conference on World Leadership Day. In April 2015, Wahl was a keynote speaker at RIMS2015. Wahl was the Opening General Session speaker at the 2015 National Association of Elementary School Principals.

=== Unthink: Rediscover Your Creative Genius ===
In 2013, Wahl wrote Unthink: Rediscover Your Creative Genius, a book about using creativity to achieve better performance. The book was published by Random House. Wahl, came up with the word "unthink" when he saw that business executives wanted to be creative, but did not know how. According to Wahl, the word "unthink" means to "unleash and unlock the mind to come up with boundless, innovative solutions." Unthink released in June 2013 was ranked as the number one Business Best-seller on CEO Reads and stayed in top ten in July 2013.

Fast Company writer Ekaterina Walter agreed with his message that it is more important for a business to be creative than to be stable. Paul B. Brown in Forbes noted that it was part of a trend for books on creativity in business. Publishers Weekly called it "thought-provoking" calling it a "strong work" and praising the originality of its message about the importance of "goofing off" in the business environment. Economic Times called it "a good read."

== Philanthropy ==
Wahl stopped displaying his paintings in galleries and no longer sells them to individual buyers. His art is done for public speaking conferences and charitable events where they are auctioned off. In 2012, Wahl painted a portrait of Marilyn Monroe in three minutes at a graffiti art auction in front of an audience. His painting was bought by Pink and her husband Carey Hart for $10,000. The proceeds were donated to Linda's Voice, a non-profit that raises awareness for ending domestic abuse globally. Similarly, Wahl presented at the Influence Affair event thrown by Ian Somerhalder in 2012 for environmental awareness that also included performances by DJ Josh LeCash and Capital Cities.

In May 2013, he donated his painting of Lady Liberty in a live auction to benefit One Fund Boston, an organization founded by Governor Deval Patrick and Mayor Tom Menino for the victims of the Boston Marathon bombings. The painting was sold for $10,500. At the launch event of his book in West Hollywood in 2013, he created a painting of Albert Einstein in front of the audience. The painting was auctioned at Charitybuzz and the proceeds of the painting were donated to After-School All-Stars. In 2014, Wahl donated three paintings to the Miracle-Ear Foundation and raised $21,000.

In January 2019, during the Jacuzzi Hot Tubs and Sundance Spas ELEVATE Dealer Conference in Whistler, BC, Erik Wahl created paintings of John Lennon and Albert Einstein during his keynote address. Both paintings were auctioned at the conference's closing event with the proceeds donated to WISH for OUR HEROES, a nonprofit organization dedicated to providing resources to the active duty service men and women during and after their deployment. As a result, US$20,000 was raised for this U.S.-based foundation with the Albert Einstein painting purchased by Alfred Armstark from Armstark Germany (Armstark.de) and John Lennon painting purchased by Scottsdale, Arizona-based dealer, Imagine Backyard Living.

In July 2024, Wahl created an Albert Einstein painting on stage during a keynote address for Mathnasium’s annual convention in his hometown of San Diego. A group of Mathnasium franchisees raised $31,400 (alluding to pi). Funds were donated to the Nic Martinek Scholarship Fund and the painting gifted to one of Mathnasium’s co-founders, Larry Martinek.

== Art Drop ==
In 2012, Wahl started a treasure hunt-based game called, Art Drop. As a part of the treasure hunt, he places his original paintings at undisclosed locations and provides his social media followers with a photograph of the location. The first to spot and claim the work wins the painting. Paintings of icons such as Audrey Hepburn, Steve Jobs and Martin Luther King Jr. have been given to people as a part of Art Drop. His wife does a similar activity in which she "drops" hand-crafted butterflies every Sunday and then donates between $100 and $500 to the finder's chosen charity.

== Personal life ==
Wahl lives in San Diego.

== Bibliography ==
- Wahl, Erik. Unthink: Rediscover Your Creative Genius (2013) ISBN 978-0-7704-3400-7
