= Wahle =

- Pronunciation: /ˈwɔːl/

Origin
- Region of origin: Germany, Austria, Czechia

Wahle is a surname. Notable people with the surname include:

- Ernst Wahle (1889–1981), German archaeologist
- Kurt Wahle (1855–1928), Saxon-born German army officer
- Michael "Mike" James Wahle (born 1977), American football guard
- Otto Wahle (1879–1963), Jewish Austrian-American swimmer
- Richard Wahle (1857–1935), Jewish Austrian professor of philosophy

== See also ==
- Wahl (disambiguation)
