= Wal Burleigh =

Australian rules footballer

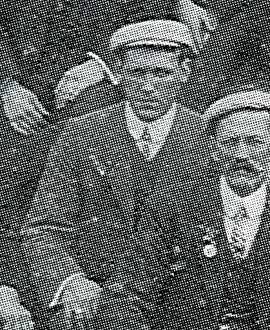

Personal information
- Full name: Walter Davies Burleigh
- Born: 7 June 1886; Nirranda, Victoria
- Died: 7 August 1948 (aged 62); Coburg, Victoria
- Original team: Allansford
- Height: 179 cm (5 ft 10 in)
- Weight: 79 kg (174 lb)

Playing career^{1}
Years	Club	Games (Goals)
1909–10	Collingwood	11 (1)
- ^{1} Playing statistics correct to the end of 1910.

Walter Davies Burleigh (7 June 1886 – 7 August 1948) was an Australian rules footballer who played with Collingwood in the Victorian Football League (VFL).
