= Wal =

Wal or WAL may refer to:

== Places ==
- Wał, Lublin Voivodeship, village in eastern Poland
- Wał, Masovian Voivodeship, village in east-central Poland

=== Codes ===
- Sierra Leone, country in West Africa, license plate code
- Wales, constituent nation of the United Kingdom, FIFA code
- Wallonia, Walloon Region of Belgium, ISO 3166-2 code BE-WAL
- Wallis and Futuna, French overseas collectivity, ITU country code

== People ==
=== Given named ===
- Wal (given name)
- Niels Wal Hansen (1892–1973), Dutch sailer

=== Surnamed ===
- Peter Chol Wal, South Sudanese politician
- Priya Wal (born 1985), Indian actress
- Van der Wal (surname), a Dutch surname which can also be derived as Wal

=== Fictional characters ===
- Wallace Cadwallader "Wal" Footrot, the main character in the Footrot Flats comic strip
- Wal Rus, a Marvel Comics character, a fictional anthropomorphic walrus

== Brands, groups, organizations, enterprises ==
- Wal (bass), a brand of electric bass guitars, founded by Ian Waller and Pete Stevens
- Wal-Mart Stores, a multi-national retailer founded by Sam Walton
- Western Alliance Bancorporation, a regional bank holding company headquartered in Phoenix, Arizona

== Technology ==
- Wide-angle lens, photographic equipment
- Write-ahead logging, a database management technique

== Transport ==
- Wallops Flight Facility (IATA: WAL), Virginia, USA
- Walton-on-Thames railway station (National Rail: WAL), Surrey, England
- World Atlantic Airlines (ICAO: WAL), an airline based in Miami, Florida, USA

== Other uses ==
- Wolaitta language (ISO 639: wal)
- Dornier Do J Wal ("whale"), a German flying boat of the 1920s
- Weighted-average life, in loan repayment timing

== See also ==
- Dornier Do R Super Wal (superwhale), a German flying boat airliner
- Wall (disambiguation)
- Walle (name)
