= Walsh (surname) =

Walsh Breathnach
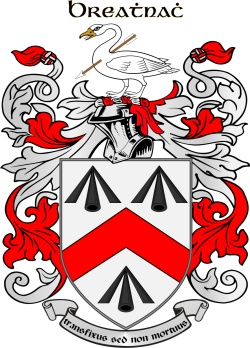
- Walsh of Castlehale coat of arms
- Historic seat: Castlehale (Walsh of the Mountains, Kilkenny); Carrickmines Castle (Walsh of Carrickmines, Dublin)

Walsh (Irish: Breathnach) is a common Irish surname. It derives from a Middle English variant of the word "Welsh", and originally denoted a Welsh speaker, a number of whom arrived in Ireland following the Anglo-Norman invasion of the 12th century. It is the fourth most common surname in Ireland and the 265th most common in the United States. There are variants including "Walshe", "Welch", "Welsh", and "Brannagh" (an anglicisation of the Irish form). Walsh is uncommon as a given name. The name is often pronounced "Welsh" in the south and west of the country.

In Great Britain, Guppy encountered the name only in Lancashire. It is the surname of the Barons Ormathwaite.

== History ==
=== Origins in Ireland ===
There are several Walsh families in Ireland who have recognized coats of arms. These are the Walshs of Ballykilcaven in County Laois whose motto is "Firm" and their crest is a griffin's head. The Walshs of Castlehale in County Kilkenny have a crest with a swan pierced by an arrow, and their motto is "Pierced but not dead". The Walshs of Carrickmines Castle, County Dublin have a crest with a demi-lion rampant and their motto is "Do not irritate the lions". However, there were Walshs all over Ireland. One theory as to their origin is that they have a common ancestor in 'Walynus' who came to Ireland in the military retinue of Maurice FitzGerald, Lord of Lanstephan and it is from 'Walynus' who the famed Walsh of the Mountains family in County Kilkenny was established. Other sources suggest 'Phillip of Wales' who could have been the same person as 'Walynus' whose son, Howel, gave his name to their stronghold Castle Hoel, which was also known as Castlehale or Castlehowel. Other theories are that the Walshs originated from Pembrokeshire, that they had close ties with the barons of Cornwall or that they descended from Owen Gwynnes, a prince of north Wales.

=== 15th century and clan conflicts ===
In 1402, the O'Byrne clan of County Wicklow, who periodically raided Dublin, moved a large mercenary force to the banks of the River Dargle at Bray, but, as the direct route to the city would bring them close to the Walsh stronghold of Carrickmines Castle, they apparently hesitated before attacking. The delay allowed the Walsh family, who owned Carrickmines, to send an urgent warning to Dublin. The Dubliners responded decisively: the Mayor of Dublin with a large force fell on the O'Byrnes and defeated them, in an encounter popularly known as the Battle of Bloody Bank, due to the number of casualties.

=== 17th century and civil war ===
As a major fortification, Carrickmines Castle had an extensive curtain wall flanked by towers protecting an area of some acres. Within this was a settlement with a variety of wooden and stone buildings, mills, and a keep or hall house in the centre. The site still contains impressive defences, hewn into bedrock, and human remains from when the castle was overwhelmed in 1642. In the Irish Rebellion of 1641, the Catholic Walshs, who owned the castle, sided with the native Irish and the Confederate attempt to create the first independent Irish parliament. They paid dearly – as a focus of the Irish Confederate Wars, the castle was besieged by English forces, and when it was retaken, over 300 of the Walsh, O'Byrne, and O'Tooles were massacred.

Also during the Irish Rebellion of 1641, William Walsh was taken prisoner after the siege of Crean's Castle in Sligo.

During the Wars of the Three Kingdoms the Walsh of the Mountains family in Kilkenny took up arms against Oliver Cromwell and as a result, their stronghold of Castlehale was besieged and taken in 1650. The survivors were executed and thrown into a burial pit at the bottom of a hill near the castle. In the nineteenth century, their remains were uncovered during road building near the hill.

=== In modern times ===
According to John Grenham writing in 1993, Walsh was then among the five most numerous surnames in Ireland.

== Motto ==
The Walsh family motto in Latin is "Transfixus sed non mortuus", which is translated to current English as "Pierced but not dead". Many translations incorrectly translate "Transfixus" to "Transfixed", which is a literal translation. In most coats of arms you will only see the shield, many images omit the "pierced" or "impaled" swan, which gives the translation greater context and meaning. There are many views on the meaning behind the translation, however, most coats of arms would denote a statement of positivity. Many believe that the piercing or impaling is a sign of resilience and strength, signifying perseverance regardless of injury.

== People with the surname ==
People with the surname include:

=== A–E ===
- A. D. Walsh, British chemist
- Adam Walsh (American football) (1901–1985), American football player and coach
- Addie Walsh, soap opera writer
- Adrian Walsh (born 1963), Australian philosopher
- Alan Walsh (disambiguation)
- Amelia Walsh (born 1992), Canadian cyclist
- Andrew Walsh (politician) (1838–1889), American politician and judge
- Augie Walsh, baseball player
- Benjamin Dann Walsh, American entomologist
- Bertram John Walsh (born 1938), American mathematician
- Bill Walsh (disambiguation)
- Blaine Walsh, Milwaukee Braves and Green Bay Packers announcer
- Bradley Walsh, footballer, TV presenter and soap actor
- Brendan Walsh (chef), American chef
- Brendon Walsh, American stand-up comedian
- Brian Walsh (disambiguation)
- Calla Walsh (born 2004) American political activist
- Carl E. Walsh, economist and professor
- Christopher Walsh (disambiguation)
- Christy Walsh (disambiguation)
- Colin Walsh (disambiguation)
- Courtney Walsh, former international cricketer
- Craig Walsh (born 1971), American composer
- David I. Walsh, Senator and Governor of Massachusetts
- David Walsh (disambiguation), multiple people
- Denis Walsh (disambiguation)
- Dennis Walsh (1933–2005), English astronomer
- Dennis G. Walsh (born 1965), American Catholic bishop
- Éamonn Walsh (bishop) (born 1944), Irish former Roman Catholic prelate
- Éamonn Walsh (politician) (1945–2025), Irish Labour Party politician
- Ed Walsh (1881–1959), baseball player
- Eddie Walsh (disambiguation)
- Edmund A. Walsh (1885–1956), Jesuit priest and educator
- Edward Walsh (disambiguation)
- Eileen Walsh, Irish actress
- Ellard A. Walsh, U.S. National Guard and Army officer
- Erda Walsh (born 1952), Canadian politician
- Evalyn Walsh, last private owner of the Hope Diamond

=== F–J ===
- Fintan Patrick Walsh (1894–1963), New Zealand politician and union leader
- Frances Walsh (born 1959), screenwriter, film producer, and musician
- Frank B. Walsh (1895–1978), Canadian-American ophthalmologist
- Gerald Thomas Walsh (1942–2025), American Roman Catholic bishop
- Gretchen Walsh, American swimmer
- Hayden Walsh Jr, West Indies cricketer
- Holly Walsh, British comedian
- Ian Walsh (footballer) (born 1958), Welsh international footballer
- J. T. Walsh, American actor
- Jack Walsh (disambiguation)
- Jake Walsh (born 1995), American baseball player
- James Walsh (disambiguation)
- Jamie Walsh (rugby league)
- Jamie Walsh (politician)
- Jared Walsh, American baseball player
- Jeffrey Walsh, Catholic bishop-elect of Gaylord, Michigan, U.S.
- Jill Walsh (cyclist) (born 1963), American cyclist
- Jill Paton Walsh (1937–2020), English novelist and children's writer
- Jimmy Walsh (baseball outfielder), Irish baseball player
- Jim Walsh (disambiguation)
- Joan Walsh, journalist
- Joan E. Walsh, British numerical analyst
- Joe Walsh, American guitarist and rock musician
- Joe Walsh (American politician), American politician
- Joe Walsh (Irish politician), Irish politician
- John Walsh (disambiguation), including people named Jack
- Joseph L. Walsh (1895–1973), American mathematician

=== K–P ===
- Kate Walsh (actress) (born 1967), American actress
- Kate Walsh (presenter) (born 1981), British TV presenter
- Kay Walsh, an English actress and dancer
- Keira Walsh (born 1997), English association football player
- Kerri Walsh Jennings (born 1978), American beach volleyball player
- Kimberley Walsh, member of British girl band Girls Aloud
- Larkin Walsh, American lawyer and judge
- Lawrence Walsh (regarding Iran Contra Affair)
- Leighton Walsh, DJ better known by the stage name Walshy Fire
- Lois Walsh, American Air Force advanced computing researcher
- Louis Walsh (born 1952), Irish pop music manager and X Factor judge
- Maiara Walsh (born 1988), American actress
- María Elena Walsh, Argentine singer and writer
- Mark Walsh (disambiguation)
- Martin Walsh (disambiguation)
- Marty Walsh, U.S. Secretary of Labor, mayor of Boston, Massachusetts
- Mary Walsh (disambiguation)
- Matt Walsh (disambiguation)
- Maureen Walsh (born 1969), American politician
- Maurice Walsh, Irish novelist
- Michael Walsh (Medal of Honor), American Medal of Honor recipients
- Michaela Walsh (disambiguation)
- Mickey Walsh, Irish footballer and football agent
- Miguel Walsh (born 1981), Argentine mathematician
- Noel Walsh, Irish Gaelic footballer, administrator, selector, manager and member of the Defence Forces
- Norman Walsh, Rhodesian and Zimbabwean air marshal
- Orla Walsh, Irish track cyclist
- Pat Walsh (disambiguation)
- Patricia Walsh (1952-2026), Argentine political activist, daughter of Rodolfo Walsh
- Patrick Walsh (disambiguation)
- Paul Walsh (disambiguation)
- Peter Walsh (disambiguation)
- Phil Walsh (Australian footballer), Australian rules football player and coach (murdered in 2015)
- Phil Walsh (English footballer), English association footballer
- Phil K. Walsh (died 1935), Australian actor and silent film producer

=== R–Z ===
- Raoul Walsh (1887–1980), American film director
- Rhoda Walsh, American bridge player
- Richard Walsh (disambiguation)
- Robert Walsh (disambiguation)
- Rodolfo Walsh (1927–1977), Argentine journalist, writer and political activist, considered the founder of investigative journalism
- Roger Walsh, Australian psychiatrist and philosopher
- Bunna Walsh (1933–2022), Australian politician
- Ruby Walsh, Irish jockey
- Sam Walsh (disambiguation)
- Samuel Walsh (artist), Irish artist
- Samuel P. Walsh, (1902–1961) American educator and politician
- Sandy Walsh, Indonesian football player
- Sean Walsh (disambiguation)
- Seann Walsh, English actor
- Shannon Walsh, Canadian filmmaker
- Sheila Walsh (disambiguation)
- Stanisława Walasiewicz, aka Stella Walsh, Polish-American track and field athlete
- Stephen Walsh (disambiguation), including people named Steve or Steven
- Suzanne Elise Walsh, American academic administrator
- Terry Walsh (disambiguation)
- Therese Walsh, chief executive and business leader from New Zealand
- Tim Walsh (disambiguation)
- Thomas Walsh (disambiguation), including people named Tom or Tommy
- Tony Walsh (poet), English performance poet
- Walt Walsh, baseball player
- W. H. Walsh (1913–1986), British philosopher
- William Walsh (disambiguation)
- Willie Walsh (disambiguation)

== Fictional characters ==
- Andie Walsh, from Pretty in Pink
- Anna Walsh, from When the Bough Breaks (2016 film)
- Connor Walsh, in the television series How to Get Away with Murder
- Jack Walsh, the character portrayed by Robert De Niro in the film Midnight Run
- Maggie Walsh, from Buffy the Vampire Slayer
- Mikey Walsh, from The Goonies
- Shane Walsh (The Walking Dead), from The Walking Dead
- A family of characters in the Beverly Hills, 90210 franchise; see List of Beverly Hills, 90210 characters
  - Jim and Cindy Walsh, parents
  - Brandon and Brenda Walsh, fraternal twin children
- Toni Walsh, from Red Dawn

== See also ==
- Attorney General Walsh (disambiguation)
- General Walsh (disambiguation)
- Judge Walsh (disambiguation)
- Justice Walsh (disambiguation)
- Senator Walsh (disambiguation)
- Walshe (surname)
- Welch (surname)
- Welsh (surname)
- Wallace (surname)
