= James Walsh =

James Walsh may refer to:

== Government and military ==
- James A. Walsh (Medal of Honor) (1897–1960), U.S. seaman and participant in the 1914 occupation of Veracruz
- James Augustine Walsh (1906–1991), U.S. federal judge
- James Donald Walsh (born 1946), United States Ambassador to Argentina from 2000 to 2003
- James H. Walsh, American labor organizer
- James J. Walsh (New York politician) (1858–1909), American politician, U.S. Representative from New York
- J. J. Walsh (1880–1948), a.k.a. James Joseph Walsh, Irish Cumann na nGaedheal politician, TD for Cork Borough
- James Morrow Walsh (1840–1905), NWMP officer and first commissioner of Yukon Territory
- James T. Walsh (born 1947), American politician, U.S. Representative from New York

== Religious ==
- James Walsh (Irish priest) (1837–1919), Irish Anglican priest
- James Anthony Walsh (1867–1936), American Roman Catholic priest, founder of Maryknoll Fathers and Brothers
- James Edward Walsh (1891–1981), American Maryknoll bishop and missionary

== Sports ==
- James Walsh (cricketer) (1913–1986), Australian cricketer
- James Walsh (equestrian) (born 1948), Irish Olympic equestrian
- James Walsh (hurler) (born 1983), hurler from Ballinakill in Laois
- James Walsh (swimmer) (born 1986), Philippine swimmer
- James Andrew Walsh (1909–1985), Irish hurler
- Flat Walsh (James Patrick Walsh, 1897–1959), Canadian ice hockey goaltender

== Others ==
- James Walsh (convict) (c. 1833–1871), transported convict, known for prison wall paintings in Western Australia
- James Walsh (musician) (born 1980), British musician, frontman of the rock band Starsailor
- James Joseph Walsh (1865–1942), American physician and author
- James P. Walsh (born 1953), American organizational theorist
- James Walsh (physician) (1923–2018), Irish medical doctor
- James Morgan Walsh (1897–1952), Australian writer

== See also ==
- Jim Walsh (disambiguation)
