= John Kirkwood =

John Kirkwood may refer to:

- John Kirkwood (engraver) (died 1853), Scot who became the foremost engraver in Dublin during the 1830s
- John A. Kirkwood (1851–1930), American soldier and Medal of Honor recipient
- John Gamble Kirkwood (1907–1959), American chemist and physicist
- John Hendley Morrison Kirkwood (1877–1924), British landowner and politician
