= Jim Walsh =

Jim or Jimmy Walsh may refer to:

== Sportspeople ==
=== Footballers ===
- Jimmy Walsh (footballer, born 1901) (1901–1971), English footballer
- Jimmy Walsh (footballer, born 1930) (1930–2014), Scottish footballer who played for Celtic and Leicester City
- Jimmy Walsh (footballer, born 1954), English footballer

=== Hurlers ===
- Jim Walsh (Dublin hurler) (1895–1950), Irish hurler
- Jim Walsh (Kilkenny hurler) (1933–1995), Irish hurler
- Jimmy Walsh (Antrim hurler) (1911–?), Northern Irish—also O'Connell's
- Jimmy Walsh (Kilkenny hurler) (1911–1977), Irish hurler—Carrickshock & Kilkenny

=== Other sports ===
- Jim Walsh (basketball) (1930–1976), American player
- Jim Walsh (ice hockey) (born 1956), American League player
- Jim Walsh (pitcher) (1894–1967), American baseball player
- Jim Walsh (rugby union) (born 1926), rugby union player who represented Australia
- Jim Walsh (water polo), former water polo representative from New Zealand
- Jimmy Walsh (American boxer) (1883–1964), 1905 American World Bantamweight Champion
- Jimmy Walsh (boxer) (1913–1964), British lightweight national boxing champion 1936–38
- Jimmy Walsh (infielder) (1886–1947), American baseball player
- Jimmy Walsh (outfielder) (1885–1962), American baseball player

== Others ==
- Jim Walsh (Canadian politician) (born 1949), businessperson and former politician in Newfoundland and Labrador
- Jim Walsh (columnist) (1903–1990), American authority on early popular recordings
- James Walsh (registrar) (1930–2008), registrar of the University of Leeds
- Jim Walsh (Irish politician) (born 1947), Irish Fianna Fáil politician
- James P. Walsh (born 1953), known as Jim, American organizational theorist
- James T. Walsh (born 1947), known as Jim, American politician
- Jim Walsh (Washington politician), member of the Washington State House of Representatives

== Characters ==
- Jim Walsh, a character in The Alphabet Killer
- Jim Walsh, a character in Beverly Hills, 90210

== See also ==
- James Walsh (disambiguation)
