= Edward Walsh =

Edward Walsh may refer to:

== Sports ==
- Ed Walsh (1881–1959), Major League pitcher
- Ed Walsh Jr. (1905–1937), Major League pitcher, son of Ed Walsh
- Ed Walsh (ice hockey) (born 1951), retired goaltender
- Eddie Walsh (footballer) (1914–2006), Kerry Gaelic footballer
- Edward Walsh (rugby union) (1861–1939), Irish rugby union player

== Journalism ==
- Edward J. Walsh (journalist) (1942–2014), American political journalist for The Washington Post
- Eddie Walsh (journalist), American syndicated senior foreign correspondent

== Other ==
- Edward Walsh (physician) (1756–1832), Irish physician
- Edward Walsh (poet) (1805–1850), Irish poet
- Edward J. Walsh (politician) (1890–1934), American lawyer and New York State Assembly member
- Edward M. Walsh (born 1939), founding president of the University of Limerick, Ireland
- Edward Walsh (diplomat), American business executive and diplomat
