= Bernard Mulrenin =

Irish painter (1803–1868)

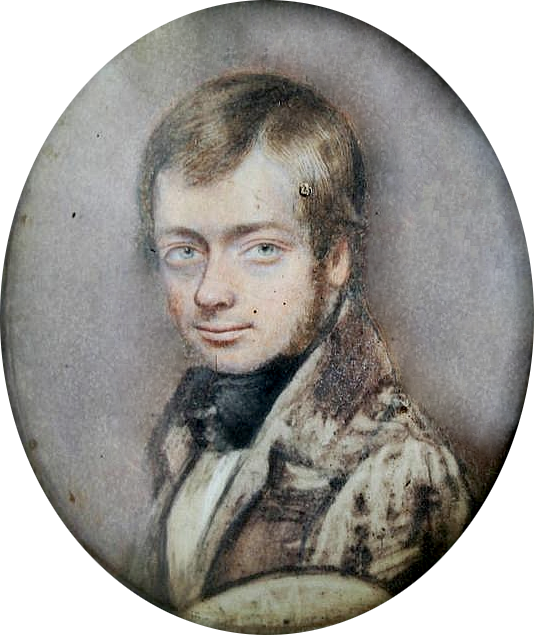
- Self-Portrait by Bernard Mulrenin
- Born: 1803; County Sligo, Ireland
- Died: 22 March 1868 (aged 64–65); Great Brunswick Street, Dublin, Ireland
- Resting place: St. Andrew's Church, Westland Row, Dublin
- Known for: Painting (miniature)
- Spouse: Mary Quill (died 1844)
- Elected: Royal Hibernian Academy

Signature
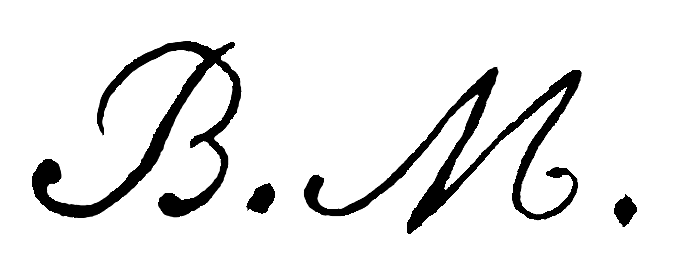

Bernard Mulrenin, RHA (1803 – 22 March 1868) was an Irish painter best known for his miniatures.

He is associated with the early Celtic Revival movement, and is remembered for his leadership and frequent exhibitions at the Royal Hibernian Academy. The subjects of Mulrenin's portraiture include individuals connected to Irish Nationalism, both Protestant and Catholic.

== Biography ==
Mulrenin was born in County Sligo, Ireland. He developed his techniques for illustration and painting with the support of his local community, practicing primarily in portrait miniatures. To supplement his work as a painter, Mulrenin found employment with the Ordnance Survey in Ireland.

In 1825, Mulrenin moved to Dublin. Within the year, he was able to exhibit a selection of his works at the newly-established Royal Hibernian Academy. An early friend and patron of Mulrenin's in Dublin was the novelist Lady Morgan, who introduced Mulrenin to politicians and creatives including Amelia Curran, Lord Charlemont, Thomas Moore, Richard Lalor Sheil, and Chief Baron Woulfe. In the 1830s, Mulrenin experienced continued growth in his business, especially after the death of John Comerford in 1832 and the relocation of Samuel Lover to London in 1835, since both men were viewed as Ireland's preeminent miniaturists.

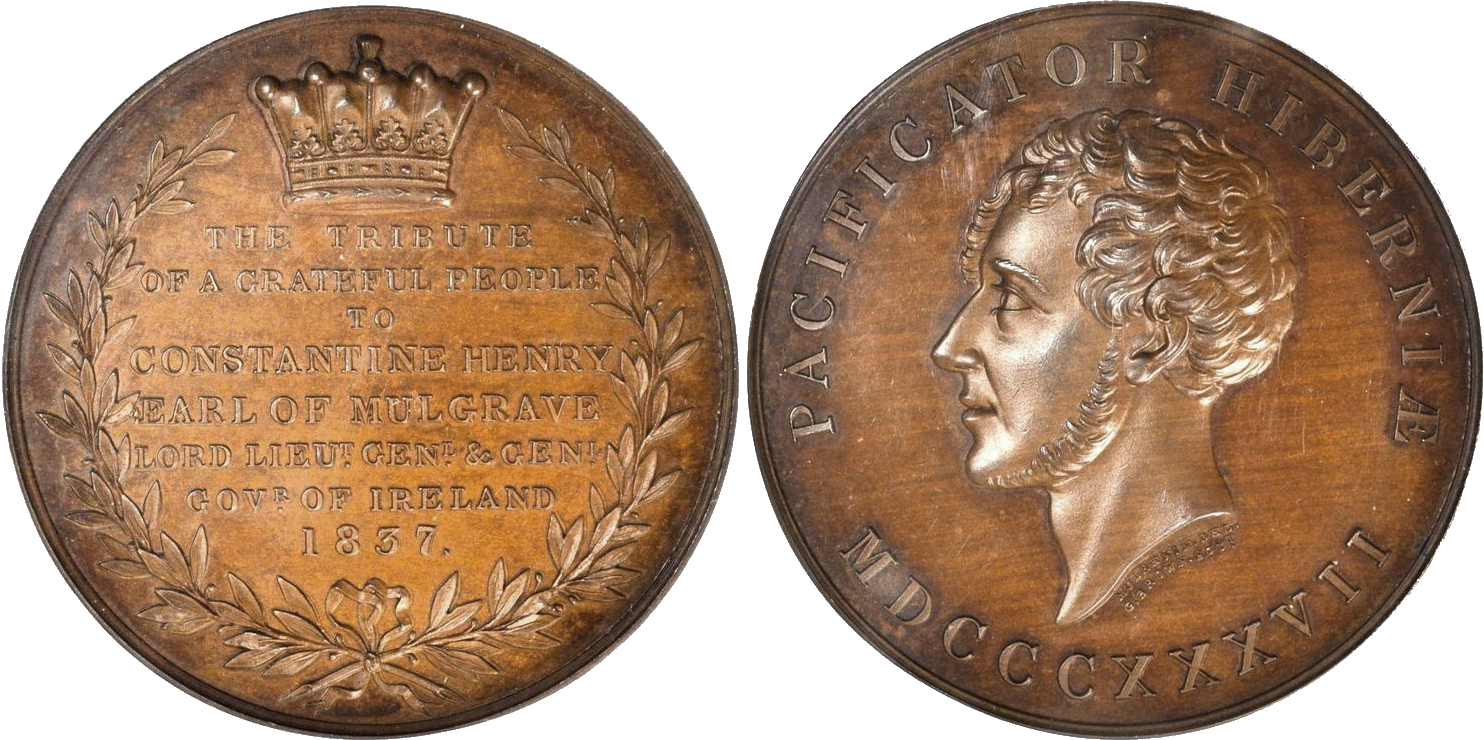
Tribute medal to Constantine Phipps, 2nd Earl of Mulgrave, 1837, bronze. Designed by Mulrenin.

Mulrenin received a court appointment from the Earl of Clarendon in 1848, and his first exhibition at the Royal Academy of Arts in 1851. Nevertheless, he remained loyal to the RHA, exhibiting over 400 works in his lifetime. External pressures on public buying power, such as the Great Famine, however, led the academy to a financial crisis in the 1850s. In March 1856, Michael Angelo Hayes was elected secretary and, with the support of the president Martin Cregan and the treasurer Joseph Kirk, pressed for reform. Mulrenin and his colleague Mulvany resisted these measures, and in December 1856, the academy elected Mulrenin and George Petrie in place of Hayes and Cregan, respectively. The election was disputed, and appeals for resolution were made to Lord Lieutenant George Howard, but he did not intervene. The school was closed temporarily the following year.

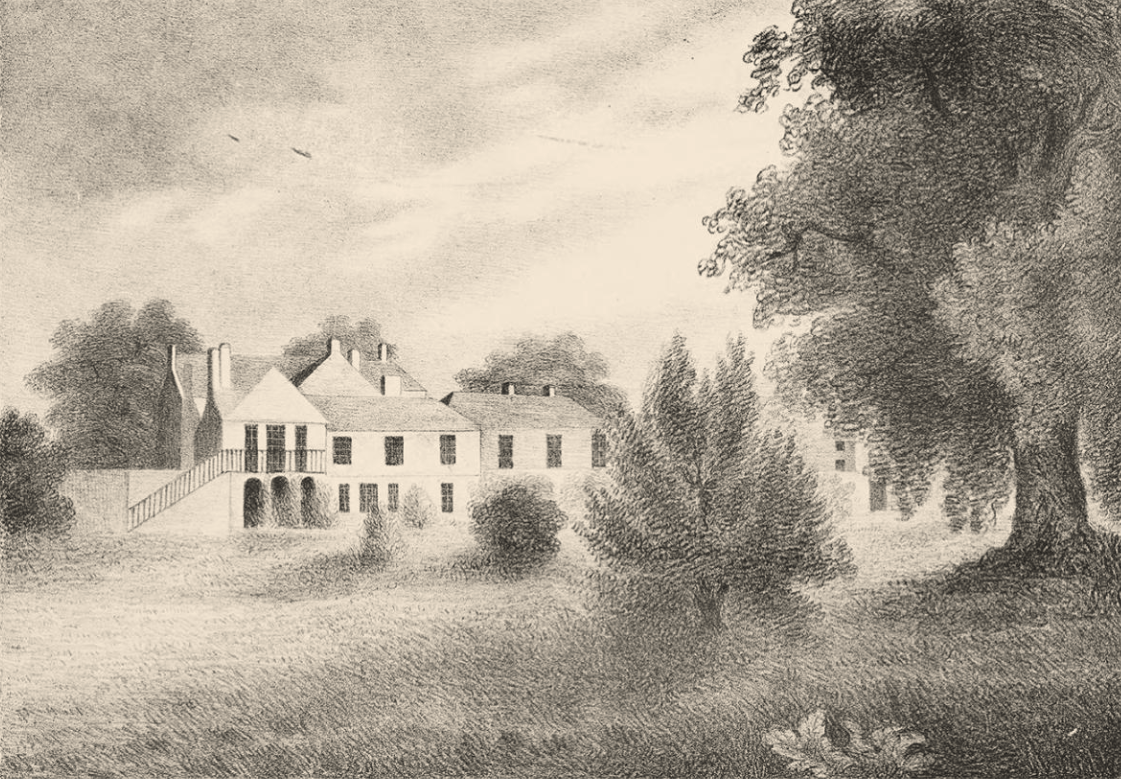
View of the Palace of Cloyne, from the south or garden front, lithograph

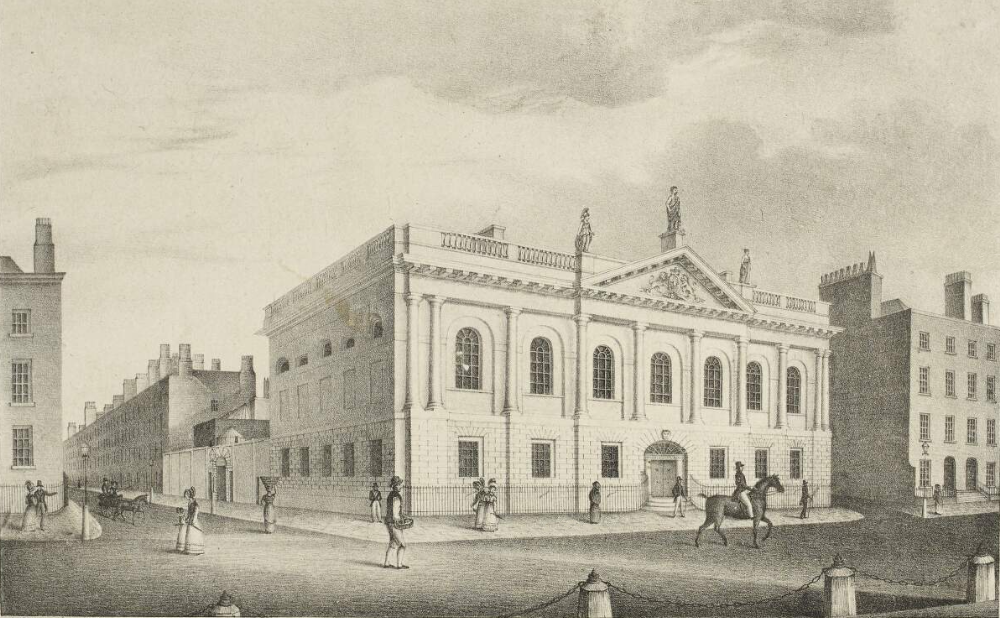
View of the College of Surgeons, Dublin, 1828, lithograph from a drawing by Mulrenin

In 1859, Mulrenin read a paper before the Royal Dublin Society's fine arts section (which included the Photographic Society of Ireland). In the speech, Mulrenin argued that photography could be used as an aide, instead of a replacement, to portrait painting. He claimed to have devised a process of transferring negatives to marble and ivory, rendering the image like a miniature painting. In 1864, Mulrenin's portrait of Oscar Wilde's mother exhibited at the RHA. He was a witness for the Wilde's defense in the libel case brought against them by Mary Travers.

== Works in collections ==
- National Gallery of Ireland
- National Library of Ireland
- National Portrait Gallery
- Victoria and Albert Museum
- British Museum
- Harry Ransom Center

== Selected portraits ==
Works sorted alphabetically by surname
Portrait	Subject	Date	Medium(s)	Institution	Profession	Notes	Ref.
	George Ensor	c. 1820-1843	lithograph	National Library of Ireland	author		
	John Hogan		charcoal	National Gallery of Ireland	sculptor	purchased: 1878	
	Daniel O'Connell	1836	watercolour bodycolour	National Portrait Gallery	politician		
	Charles O'Conor		watercolour	National Gallery of Ireland	historian		
	Lord Paget		lithograph	National Gallery of Ireland	politician	presented: 1901; uncertain attribution	
	George Petrie		oil	National Gallery of Ireland	antiquarian	presented: 1884	
	Marie Taglioni	1834	lithograph watercolour	Victoria and Albert Museum	ballerina		
	Jane Wilde	1864	watercolour	personal archives: Merlin Holland	poet		

=== Other notable subjects ===
Scientists and Academics

- John Thomas Gilbert
- Charles Graves
- Martin Haverty
- Eugene O'Curry
- John O'Donovan
- William Reeves
- James Henthorn Todd

Politicians and Nobility

- Thomas Esmonde
- Thomas Larcom
- Edward Lawless

Other

- Frances Mary Teresa Ball
- Denis Florence MacCarthy
- William Wilde

Though he preferred to depict his contemporaries, Mulrenin also drew inspiration from non-historical figures, such as Shakespeare's King Lear and the mythological Fionn-ghuala, daughter of the sea god Lir.
