= Peter Walsh =

Peter Walsh may refer to:

== Politicians ==
- Peter Walsh (Australian politician) (1935–2015), Australian senator and finance minister
- Peter Walsh (Victorian politician) (born 1954), Victorian state politician
- Peter J. Walsh (1931–1995), politician in Newfoundland and Labrador, Canada

== Sports ==
- Peter Walsh (basketball) (born 1954), Australian Olympic basketball player
- Peter Walsh (footballer) (born 1976), Australian rules footballer with Port Adelaide and Melbourne
- Peter Walsh (sports broadcaster), Australian sports commentator

== Others ==
- Peter Walsh (organizer) (born 1956), professional organizer hosting television programs such as Clean Sweep and Enough Already
- Peter Walsh (record producer) (born 1960), British music producer
- Peter Milton Walsh, Australian musician
- Peter P. Walsh (1885–1944), Pittsburgh police chief
- Peter Valesius Walsh (c.1618–1688), Irish theologian and controversialist
- A character in Virginia Woolf's Mrs Dalloway

== See also ==
- Walsh (surname)
