= Sam Walsh =

Sam Walsh or Samuel Walsh may refer to:

- Sam Walsh (businessman) (born 1949), Australian businessman
- Sam Walsh (footballer) (born 2000), Australian rules footballer
- Sam Walsh (politician) (1916–2008), leader of the Communist Party of Quebec
- Samuel Walsh (artist) (born 1951), Irish artist
- Samuel P. Walsh (1902–1961), American educator and politician
