= Christine Welsh (disambiguation) =

Christine Welsh is a Canadian filmmaker, feminist and associate professor.

== See also ==
- Christie Welsh (born 1981), American soccer player
- Kirsten Welsh, Canadian ice hockey player
- Chris Welsh (disambiguation)
- Christy Walsh (disambiguation)
