= Ardress House =

Country house in County Armagh, Northern Ireland

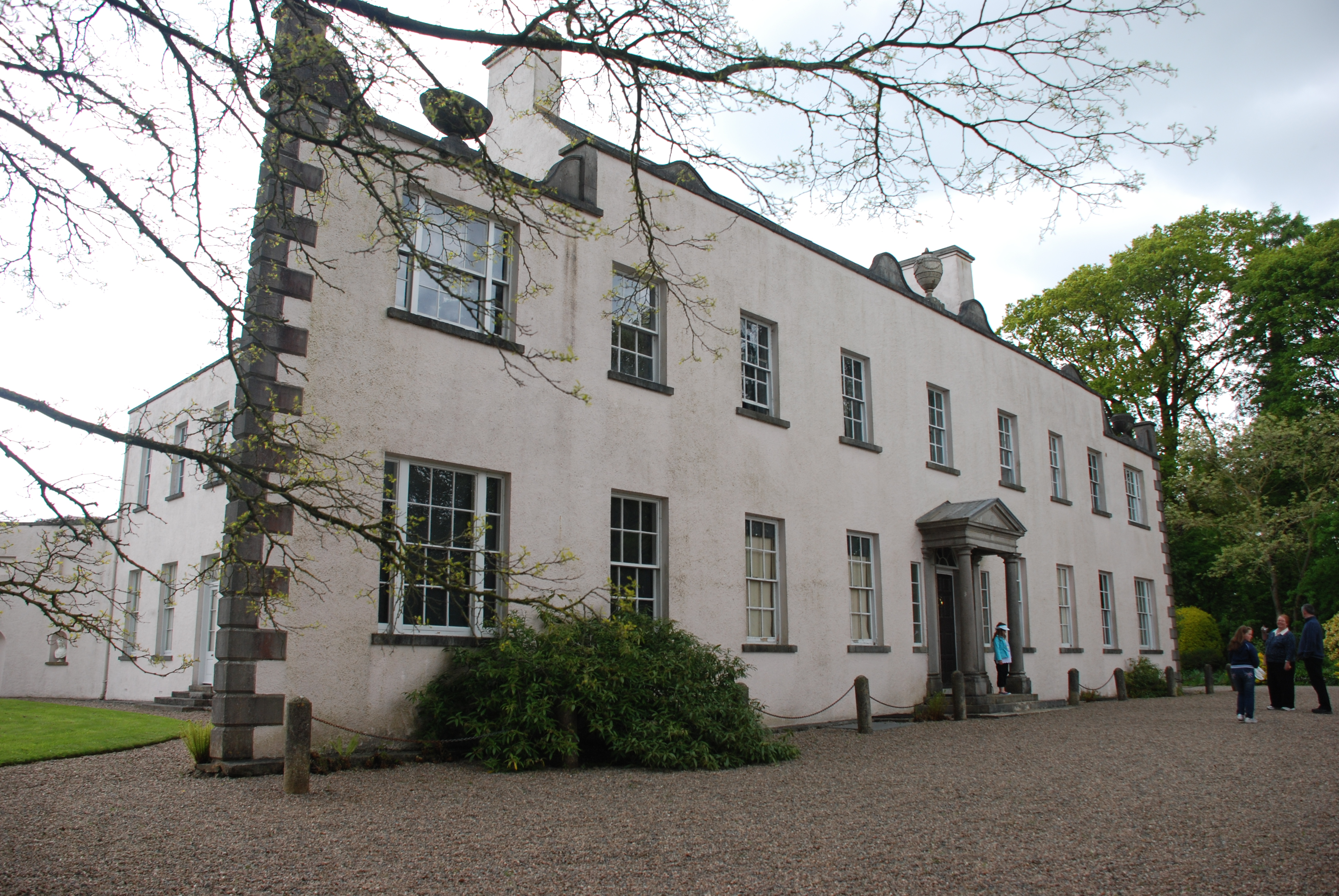
- The front elevation of Ardress House
- Location: Annaghmore, County Armagh, Northern Ireland
- Coordinates: 54°26′35″N 06°35′35″W
- Type: Historic house museum
- Website: nationaltrust.org.uk/ardress-house

Ardress House is a country house in Annaghmore, County Armagh, in Northern Ireland. The house was owned by the Clarke, then Ensor families, including the writer and lawyer George Ensor. The estate, which includes orchards, a farm and a dairy, borders the River Tall. Collections within the house include eighteenth-century paintings and furniture. In 1959, the National Trust acquired Ardress from Captain Charles Ensor with support from the Ulster Land Fund.

== History ==
Ardress House was originally a farmhouse built around 1700 by the Clarke family, after their original home was destroyed during the Wars of the Three Kingdoms. Dating for the construction of the house is supported by dendrochronological analysis undertaken by Queen's University Belfast.

In 1760, the heiress Sarah Clarke married George Ensor, a Dublin-based architect. After about twenty years of marriage the couple moved to Ardress House, which they remodelled in a neo-classical style. Ensor doubled the size of the house and added a classical portico. His main focus was on the decoration of a drawing room, which was stuccoed by the artist Michael Stapleton.

George and Sarah's son, also named George, was born in 1769. A lawyer and writer, he continued to live at Ardress House, where he made further changes including the addition of a dining room that could only be reached via an external door. This was because a connecting door could not be knocked through the fine plasterwork of the drawing room.

In 1959, a descendant, Charles Ensor, sold the house and most of the contents at auction. (Note: During this time he also donated a ring-pin found in the Tall River near the house, and a penannular brooch, to Armagh County Museum.) The National Trust was able to acquire the house with the support of the Ulster Land Fund.

From 1962, some restoration was undertaken by the architect Robert McKinstry. In 2015 the property was the recipient of a £150,000 grant to replace the 1960s cement plaster on the outside of the house with lime render. The alteration was necessary since the present exterior finish was stopping the house from "breathing", leading to damp problems inside the building. As of 2015, approximately 8000 people visited Ardress House annually.

== Estate ==
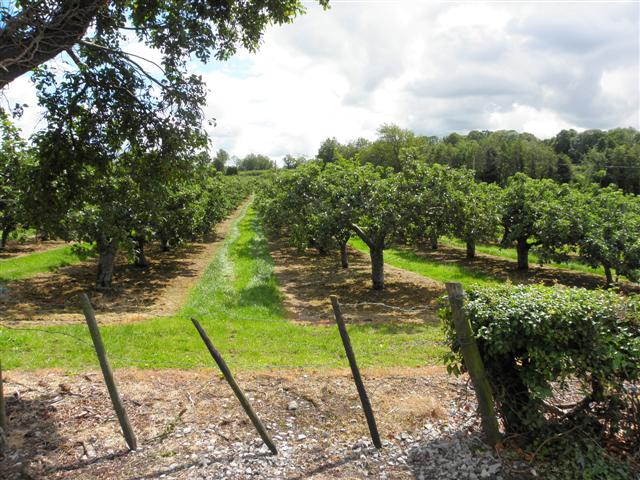
Apple orchard, Ardress

The house is set within 100 acres (40 ha) of woods, orchards, parkland and farmland. As of 2017 the orchards were managed by Greg MacNeice of MacIvor's Cider. Walking routes on the property include the Lady's Mile walk. The property is also used as a location for bat-detection events.

Part of the site is the farmyard, which has displays of traditional agricultural equipment, brought together by the Trust and the Craigavon Historical Society, as well as a forge and a dairy.

In 2017 the property received a legacy of £334,000 which enabled the restoration of a house on the estate known as Frizzell's Cottage. Last inhabited in the 1980s, the cottage was built around 1740 and is typical of the style of construction for houses in south Ulster in the eighteenth century. In order to reconstruct parts of the building, new mudbricks were made by volunteers. Since 2019 the house has been rented to tenants.

== Collections ==
Whilst the majority of the original collection belonging to the Ensor family was sold at auction, some of the pieces have been recovered. The property is notable for its furniture collection, as well as the 18th-century Dutch, Flemish and Italian paintings on display, acquired through gifts and loans. The collection also includes two models of the house, crafted in the 1980s: one model imagines the house c.1700, the other c.1900. (Note: Until 1994 a fifteenth-century logboat was displayed in the house.)

=== Ethnography ===
In 2005 the National Trust purchased a Māori taiaha and an adze from Mangaia that had been acquired by George Ensor III during his travels in the Pacific.

=== Decorative arts ===
Notable pieces of furniture in the house include an Irish Chippendale sideboard, and a mahogany bureau that doubles as a bookcase which was created around 1725. Part of the collection includes the table on which the constitution of Northern Ireland was signed on 22 June 1921 by George V.

=== Fine arts ===
Artists represented by works listed as part of the collection at Ardress House include: Strickland Lowry, Gillis Neyts, Robert Griffier, Pieter Boel, Bartolomeo Passarotti and James Barry.
