= Joshua D. Margolis =

American academic

- Education: Yale University; Harvard University
- Occupations: academic and professor, Harvard Business School

Joshua D. Margolis is an American academic. He is the James Dinan and Elizabeth Miller Professor of Business Administration at Harvard Business School (HBS). Previously, he served three years on the faculty at the University of Michigan as a Fellow in the Society of Scholars.

He has received the Robert F. Greenhill Award, the Student Association Faculty Award for teaching excellence, the Apgar Award for Innovation in Teaching, and the Academy of Management award for Outstanding Publication in Organizational Behavior.

== Publications, a selection ==
- Margolis, Joshua D., and James P. Walsh. "Misery loves companies: Rethinking social initiatives by business." Administrative science quarterly 48.2 (2003): 268-305.
- Margolis, Joshua Daniel, and James P. Walsh. People and profits?: The search for a link between a company's social and financial performance. Psychology Press, 2001.
