= Chris Welsh (disambiguation) =

Chris Welsh (born 1955) is an American sportscaster and former baseball pitcher.

Chris Welsh may also refer to:

- Christine Welsh (disambiguation)

== See also ==
- Chris Welch (born 1942), English music journalist
- Chris Welch, American football coach
- Chris Walsh (disambiguation)
