= Tim Walsh =

Tim or Timothy Walsh may refer to:

- Tim Walsh (American football) (born 1954), American football coach
- Tim Walsh (footballer) (born 1985), Australian rules footballer
- Tim Walsh (game inventor) (born 1964), American game inventor and writer
- Tim Walsh (musician) (born 1975), indie rock singer, songwriter, and producer
- Tim Walsh (rugby union) (born 1979), Australian rugby union coach and former captain of Newbury R.F.C.
- B. Timothy Walsh, professor of pediatric psychopharmacology
- Timothy Walsh (architect), American architect
- Timothy Rutland Walsh microbiologist
