= Bring Flowers of the Rarest =

Marian hymn written by Mary E. Walsh

"Bring Flowers of the Rarest" (also known as the Fairest) is a Marian hymn written by Mary E. Walsh. It was published as the "Crowning Hymn" in the Wreath of Mary 1871/1883 and later in St. Basil's Hymnal (1889). The hymn is frequently sung during a May Crowning service, one of several May devotions to the Blessed Virgin Mary.

== Text ==
1. Bring flowers of the rarest

bring blossoms the fairest,

from garden and woodland and hillside and dale;

our full hearts are swelling,

our glad voices telling

the praise of the loveliest flower of the veil!

refrain: O Mary! we crown thee with blossoms today,

Queen of the Angels, Queen of the May,

O Mary! we crown thee with blossoms today,

Queen of the Angels, Queen of the May.

2. Our voices ascending,

In harmony blending,

Oh! Thus may our hearts turn

Dear Mother, to thee;

Oh! Thus shall we prove thee

How truly we love thee,

How dark without Mary

Life's journey would be.

refrain

3. O Virgin most tender,

Our homage we render,

Thy love and protection,

Sweet Mother, to win;

In danger defend us,

In sorrow befriend us,

And shield our hearts

From contagion and sin.

refrain

4. Of Mothers the dearest,

Oh, wilt thou be nearest,

When life with temptation

Is darkly replete?

Forsake us, O never!

Our hearts be they ever

As Pure as the lilies

We lay at thy feet.

refrain

== Publication ==
- Sisters of Notre Dame (1883). Wreath of Mary [music] A collection of hymns to the Blessed Virgin. Boston, Oliver Ditson.
- St. Michael's College (1889). St. Basil's hymnal. Toronto: St. Michael's college., Toronto, Ontario.
