= Robert Walsh =

Robert Walsh may refer to:

- Robert Walsh (Australian politician) (1824–1899), member of the Victorian Legislative Assembly and attorney-general
- Robert Walsh (diplomat) (1785–1859), American publicist and diplomat
- Robert Walsh (Irish writer) (1772–1852), Irish clergyman, historian, writer and physician
- Robert Walsh (medical scientist) (1917–1983), Australian medical scientist and geneticist
- Robert Walsh (MP) (fl. 1417–1435), English member of parliament for Lincoln
- Robert Walsh (priest) (died 1917), archdeacon of Dublin, 1909–1917
- Robert Walsh (died 1821), Roman Catholic bishop of Waterford and Lismore
- Robert D. Walsh (1860–1928), United States Army officer
- Robert J. Walsh (1947–2018), American film and television composer
- Robert V. Walsh, member of the Illinois House of Representatives
- Robert Nelson Walsh (1864–1938), Canadian politician, member for Huntingdon
- Bob Walsh (American football) (c. 1919 – ?), American football coach
- Bob Walsh (basketball) (born 1972), American college basketball coach
- Bob Walsh (sports executive) (1940–2017), American sports executive, marketing executive and humanitarian
- Bobby Walsh (1877-1910), Australian footballer

== See also ==
- J. Robert Welsh, electric utilities executive
