= Matthew Welsh =

Matthew or Matt Welsh may refer to:

- Matt Welsh (born 1976), Australian swimmer
- Matt Welsh (computer scientist), computer scientist and software engineer
- Matthew E. Welsh (1912–1995), 41st governor of Indiana, from 1961 to 1965
  - Matthew E. Welsh Bridge on Ohio river, named after the above
  - Bust of Matthew E. Welsh, a 1996 public artwork by American artist Daniel Edwards

== See also ==
- Matt Welch (born 1968), American writer
- Matt Walsh (disambiguation)
