= John Comerford =

Irish miniature painter

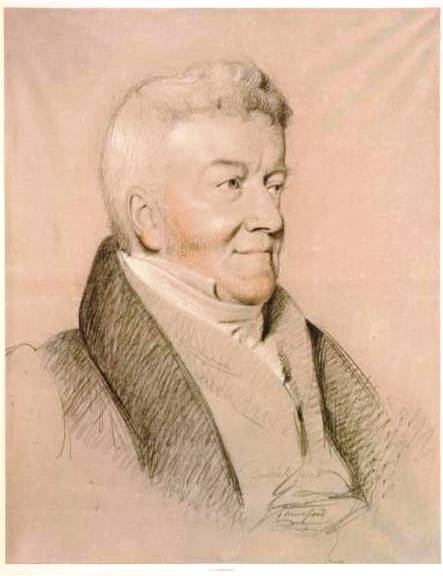
- Self portrait
- Born: c. 1770; Kilkenny, Kingdom of Ireland
- Died: 25 January 1832 (aged 61–62); Dublin, United Kingdom

John Comerford (1770–25 January 1832) was an Irish miniature painter active in Kilkenny and Dublin. He exhibited in London at the Royal Academy in 1804 and 1809.

== Early life ==
John Comerford was born in Kilkenny around 1770, though some sources put his date of birth as early as around 1762. His father was a local flax-dresser, and Comerford grew up opposite the Tholsel. Having gained some knowledge of art from copying the pictures in the collection of the Marquis of Ormonde at Kilkenny Castle, he went early in life to Dublin, and entered as a student in the art schools of the Dublin Society. In 1790, Comerford was recommended for a certificate from the school commending his "extraordinary merit in drawing from the flat". He was awarded a medal for his figure-drawing in 1791.

== Career ==
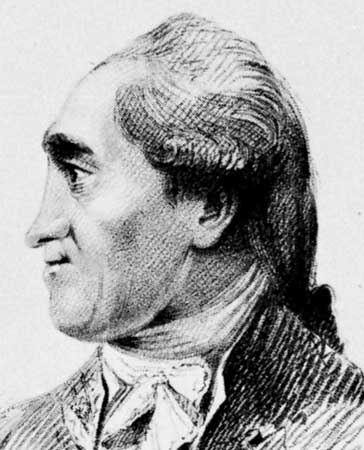
Henry Flood, engraved by James Heath from Comerford's drawing, 1811

He spent the early part of his career in Kilkenny and neighbouring counties, but he also worked in Dublin. His first commissions were of family members, including Jane, Anne, and Michael Langton of High Street, Kilkenny in 1794, and Lady Dunsany. Others were from the Dublin Society, painting portraits of Thomas Braughall and Dr Edward Walsh. His portrait of Walsh was later etched for the Dublin University Magazine in 1834 by John Kirkwood. His earlier work has been likened to the work of American portrait-painter Gilbert Stuart, who lived in Dublin from 1787 to 1793, but he was influenced later by English–born artist George Chinnery.

Comerford met Chinnery in 1799, and in 1800 Comerford moved into Chinnery's family home at 27 Dame Street. For the next 15 years, Comerford lived with the Chinnery when he was visiting Dublin. Chinnery's inclusion of Comerford's work in the 1800 exhibition of the Society of Artists Ireland helped boost Comerford's profile in Dublin. Commenting on his two miniatures of the Misses Warren, the Hibernian Journal commented "Here is an artist whom we never saw or ever before so much as heard of. Our astonishment at his pictures must excuse this note of admiration". He exhibited with the Society of Artists at Parliament House again in 1801 and 1802, establishing himself as a miniaturist.

Comerford was appointed vice-president of the Society of Artists in 1811, and exhibited in Dublin until 1814. He exhibited in London at the Royal Academy in 1804 and 1809, was very successful and gained a high reputation as a miniature-painter in Dublin, and had a large and lucrative practice in his art. He particularly excelled in his male portraits, which were carefully finished, well expressed, and quiet in colour. He continued to visit Kilkenny, painting 11 portraits of actors from the Kilkenny Private Theatre in 1808. These were subsequently engraved for The Private Theatre of Kilkenny (1825).

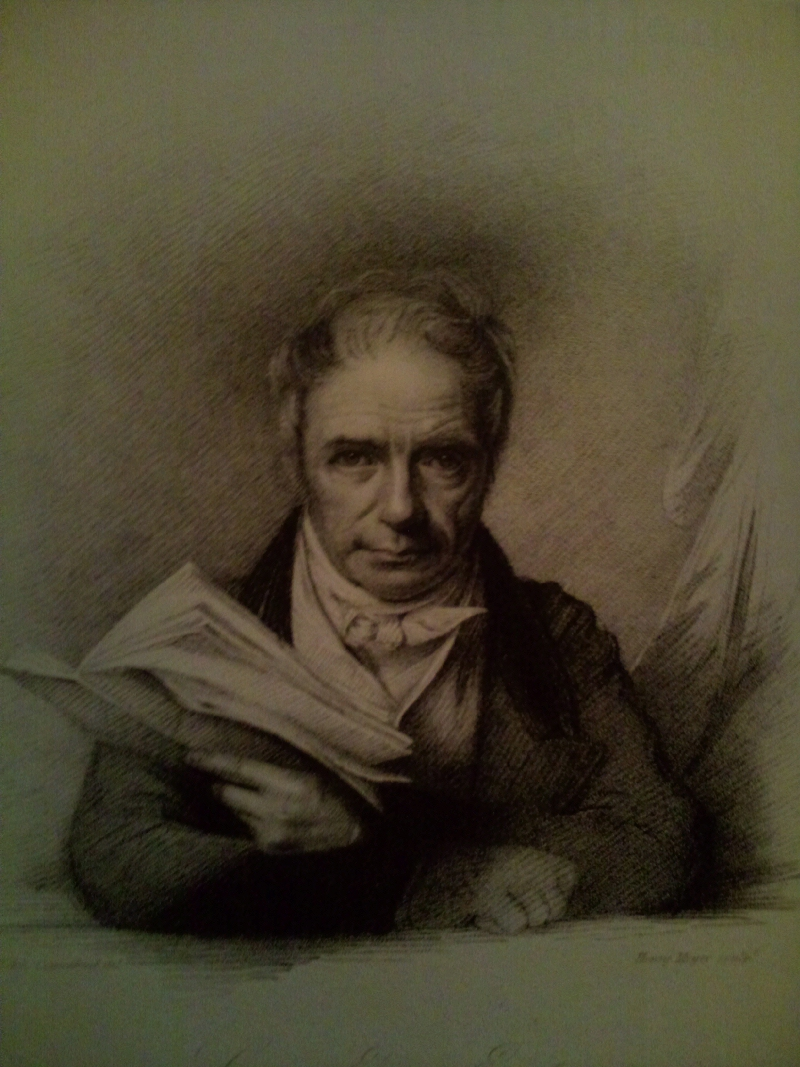
George Ensor, c. 1820–30

He was a popular artist, receiving commissions from the Irish landed gentry, the military, and the clergy, as well as more prominent figures including Daniel O'Connell, James Gandon, Richard Lovell Edgeworth, and Lord Charlemont. Many of these portraits were reproduced as engraving in the Hibernian Magazine. His portrait of O'Connell was engraved and published in London in 1825, which Comerford later used in his advertisement in the Freeman's Journal. He moved to 27 Dame Street in 1817, and later moved to 2 Leinster Street.

In 1819, the Dublin Society of Artists, which had been for some years torn by internal dissensions, applied for a charter of incorporation. This was actively opposed, and Comerford was selected by the opposers, as being a man of good repute and much respected, to write to Sir Robert Peel, then chief secretary for Ireland, explaining the reason for opposition. The controversy ended in the defeat of Comerford and his friends, and the society obtained their charter in 1821. It is speculated that Comerford was attempting to protect the artistic monopoly he enjoyed in Dublin. He subsequently never joined or exhibited with the Royal Hibernian Academy.

Comerford painted the portraits of a number of his closest friends, including Vincent Waldré and William Ashford. He also collaborated with William Cuming and Thomas Sautelle Roberts. He also taught a number of artists, such as John Doyle and Thomas Clement Thompson, and was a strong influence on Samuel Lover. Comerford retired with a fortune of £16,000.

== Death and legacy ==
While visiting Gandon in Lucan, Comerford suffered from an apoplectic seizure, and later died on 25 January 1832 at his home at 28 Blessington Street. He had one daughter, Mary, to whom he left an annuity of £500.

Some examples of his work were exhibited at the Special Exhibition of Portrait Miniatures in 1865, including portraits of Lady Sarah Lennox, Mr. Burgoyne, and Mr. William Fletcher, the latter in college dress. There is a miniature by him of an English military officer in the South Kensington Museum.

== Sources ==
- This article incorporates text from a publication now in the public domain: Cust, Lionel Henry (1887). "Comerford, John". In Stephen, Leslie (ed.). Dictionary of National Biography. Vol. 11. London: Smith, Elder & Co.
