= David Walsh =

David or Dave or Davy Walsh may refer to:

== Politicians ==
- David Walsh (politician), Irish senator
- David I. Walsh (1872–1947), American politician, governor of Massachusetts, and U.S. Senator

== Sportspeople ==
=== Footballers ===
- David Walsh (Donegal Gaelic footballer), Donegal player
- David Walsh (Tipperary Gaelic footballer) (born 1966), Irish Gaelic footballer
- Dave Walsh (Australian footballer) (1898–1975), Australian rules footballer
- David Walsh (rugby league) (born 1970), Australian rugby league footballer
- David Walsh (Welsh footballer) (born 1979), former football goalkeeper
- Davy Walsh (1923–2016), Irish footballer

=== Other sports ===
- Dave Walsh (baseball) (born 1960), baseball pitcher
- David Walsh (cricketer) (born 1946), English former cricketer and current cricket administrator
- Dave Walsh (esports player) (born 1984), American professional gamer
- David Walsh (basketball) (1889–1975), American basketball referee
- David Walsh (speedway rider) (born 1963), English speedway rider

== Others ==
- David Walsh (actor), American voice actor
- David Walsh (art collector) (born 1961), owner of the Museum of Old and New Art (MONA) in Hobart
- David Walsh (journalist) (born 1955), Irish sports reporter
- David Walsh (mining) (1945–1998), Canadian businessman, founder and CEO of the mining company Bre-X
- David Walsh (psychologist), founder of the National Institute on Media and the Family
- David Walsh (writer) (born 1949), American film critic and political writer for the World Socialist Web Site
- David M. Walsh (born 1931), American cinematographer

== Fictional ==
- David Walsh (EastEnders), fictional character
