= Mary Walsh =

Mary Walsh may refer to:

- Mary Walsh (actress) (born 1952), Canadian comedian and actress
- Mary Walsh (Dublin camogie player), captain of the All Ireland Camogie Championship winning team in 1937
- Mary Walsh (journalist), US producer at CBS news
- Mary Walsh (politician) (1929–1976), Irish Fine Gael Senator
- Mary Lee (suffragist) (1821–1909), born Mary Walsh
- Mary Walsh (Wexford camogie player), captain of the All Ireland Camogie Championship winning team in 1968
- Mary Beth Walsh, member of the New York State Assembly
- Mary Williams Walsh (born 1955), American investigative journalist
- Mary E. Walsh, American composer

== Fictional ==
- Mary Walsh, in the US thriller Abandoned (2010 film), played by Brittany Murphy
