= Richard Walsh =

Richard or Dick Walsh may refer to:

- Richard Walsh (actor) (born 1952), British television actor
- Richard Walsh (Australian publisher) (born 1941), Australian publisher and one of the original co-editors of 1960s satirical magazine Oz
- Richard Walsh (English politician), High Sheriff of Worcestershire
- Richard Walsh (fighter) (born 1988), martial artist
- Richard Walsh (Irish politician) (1889–1957), Irish Fianna Fáil politician, TD for Mayo South
- Richard A. Walsh (1930–2005), American politician
- Richard Ambrose Walsh (1862-1949), American politician and lawyer
- Richard Hussey Walsh (1825–1862), Irish political economist and colonial official
- Dick Walsh (1877–1958), Irish hurler
- Dick Walsh (executive) (1925–2011), sporting executive
- Richard F. Walsh (1900–1992), American labor union leader
- Richard J. Walsh (1887–1960), New York publisher, founder of John Day Company
- Dick Walsh (journalist), Irish journalist for Fortnight Magazine

== Fictional ==
- Richard Walsh (24 character), from television's 24
