= George Ensor =

Irish lawyer and radical political pamphleteer

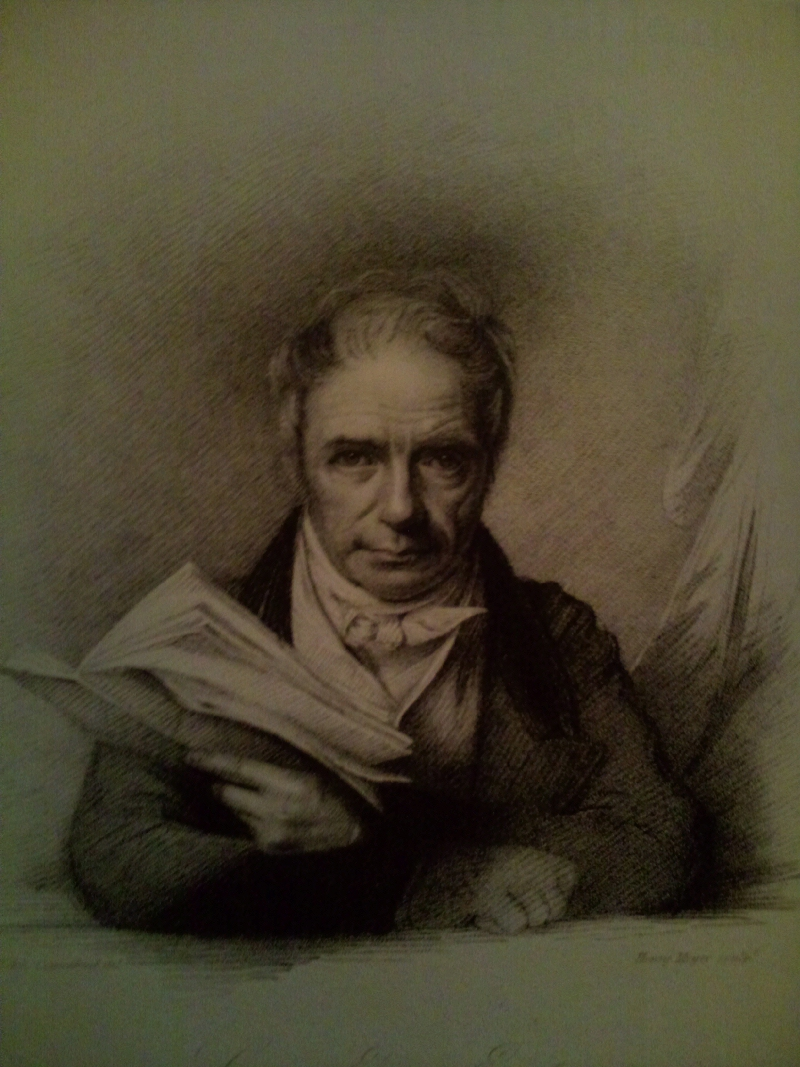
- George Ensor by John Comerford
- Born: 17 December 1769
- Died: 3 December 1843 (aged 73)
- Education: Trinity College Dublin
- Occupation: Barrister
- Notable work: An Inquiry Concerning the Population of Nations containing a Refutation of Mr. Malthus's Essay on Population (1818). Of Property and of its Equal Distribution as Promoting Virtue, Population, Abundance (1844)

George Ensor J.P. (17 December 1769 – 3 December 1843) was an Irish lawyer, radical political pamphleteer and freethinker. Among other conservative precepts, he pilloried the Malthusian doctrine that poverty is sustained by the "disposition to breed". As a hindrance to enterprise and prosperity, he pointed rather to the tyranny of concentrated wealth. In Ireland, it was a condition he believed could be reversed only through popular representation in a restored parliament. Ensor further outraged prevailing opinion by inveighing against the constitutional ascendancy not merely (as a supporter of Catholic emancipation) of Protestantism, but more broadly of the Christian religion. He argued that questions of morality and social justice cannot be addressed within a theology of salvation through faith.

== Family and education ==
Ensor was born in Dublin where is father George Ensor Sr., originally from England, was a prominent architect and developer. In 1783, his mother Sara Ensor (née Clarke) inherited Ardress House, a modest farmhouse in County Armagh, that his father transformed with, amongst other alterations, a facade with false windows to increase the property's apparent size.

Ensor was educated at Ensor Dr Murray's school, Dublin, followed by Trinity College Dublin. He graduated in 1790 and was called to the Irish Bar in 1792.

He married Esther Weld (sister of famous Irish explorer, author and painter Isaac Weld) on 7 January 1804. They had two sons and six daughters. His second daughter, Caroline, married the historian J. P. Prendergast.

== Polemics ==
Ensor was a political pamphleteer, and a prolific correspondent to the press, noted for the sarcasm he employed against the government in Ireland and in Britain. His first tract, Principles of Morality (which argued that morality was independent of religion) was published in 1801. By the time of his death in 1843 he had produced over twenty disquisitions propagating "advanced" views on English laws and tribunals; Catholic emancipation; the triumph of reaction in post-Napoleonic Europe; political economy including the sources, and relief, of poverty; Ireland's fate within the United Kingdom; parliamentary reform; national education; and the corn laws.

=== "Refutation of Mr Malthus's Essay on Population" ===
His broadest, most ambitious attempt, was to discredit the political economy of Thomas Malthus. In An Inquiry Concerning the Population of Nations containing a Refutation of Mr. Malthus's Essay on Population (1818), Ensor dismissed what has become known the "Malthusian trap". Regardless of what might be done to improve their condition, Malthus maintained that the labouring classes tend to propagate until, outpacing the means of their subsistence, their numbers invite "correction" by war, hunger, and pestilence. For Ensor the problem of poverty was not a "disposition to inordinate breeding". Rather it is that wealth is "iniquitously divided", a condition compounded by the fact that "the poor man's labour is far more surcharged that the rich man's property by taxes".

In a wide-ranging critique, Ensor took aim at the duplicitous application of the moral principle by which Malthus justified his seeming indifference to the fate of the poor:

Mr Malthus says no one has the right to subsistence when his labour will not fairly purchase it. [...] But suppose the position true, that a right to subsistence depends on the labour of the individual: whose labour?--the rich, the aristocracy, the proprietors of land, the holders of stock, heirs in their own right, and princes by divine right? Here again Paley interposes: "It is a mistake to suppose that the rich man maintains his servants, tradesmen, tenants and labourers: the truth is they maintain him".

He finds Malthus's dogmatic insistence on absolving the rich and the institutions of society of responsibility for poverty "astounding":

Mr Malthus considers that attributing in any way the distress of the poor to the higher classes of society is a vulgar error [...] and that it depends on the conduct of the poor themselves. Does slavery depend on the slaves themselves? [...] Does it depend on the Irish peasantry that the proprietors are absentees? or, on the Catholics of Ireland that they pay tithes to the protestant clergy? Does it depend on the poor of England that they pay for salt a tax thirty times the original cost of the article?

Idleness and negligence, Ensor argued were as much an effect as a cause of social evils. In India, the English complain that "the people are without industry and without energy", attributing this "stupidity" to a "rich soil and inelastic atmosphere". But faced with the dread violence and extortion of district officers "it is prudent in [the Indian peasant] to appear and to be poor".

The primary cause of poverty is not, as Malthus and his school believe, "nature and breeding". Rather (as Adam Smith proposed) it is that which impoverished the Roman state: rapti largiuntur—what is seized from the people and distributed as favours by the state. Conversely—Ensor invokes David Hume—"every country will abound with people and their comforts as it is well governed". To be well governed, is to be represented in "a well-organised constitution" and, advancing a case for parliamentary reform, Ensor observes that "representation is the most secure which is the most popular". Elevated from subject to citizen, people will "improve their intelligence; and this will regulate their number, by ascertaining their wants and conveniences". He was not aware "of any nation, which possessing confirmed liberty and equal laws, has become miserable merely by the excess of its people".

Ensor's attack upon Malthus was seconded by Whitley Stokes. His Observations on the Population and Resources of Ireland (1821) similarly concludes that Ireland's problem is not her "numbers" but her indifferent government, and that once the Irish begin to feel "whole clothes" on their backs, "effort for profit" would be made. Consistent with Ensor, William Hazlitt (1819) was also to write, "Mr Malthus wishes to confound the necessary limits of the produce of the earth with the arbitrary and artificial distribution of that produce by the institutions of society".

=== For a more equal distribution of property ===
"Property in the few", wrote Ensor, "confirms an oligarchy—property in the many is the stay of liberty, and the means of its honest and profitable increase". In a posthumous work, Of Property and of its Equal Distribution as Promoting Virtue, Population, Abundance (1844), presented as a "detailed and extensive investigation" of "property its origin, distribution and progress", Ensor took this argument against Malthus a step further.

Seizing upon Malthus's proposition that "manufacturing is at once the consequence of a better distribution of property and the cause of further improvement" (and noting William Pitt's acknowledgement that the unequal division of property was among "the chief causes of Ireland's vexations") Ensor proposed reforms to "reverse the excessive accumulation of landed property" and to "increase the middle order of society".Among other things, these included ejecting the unelected representatives of the landed interest (the hereditary Lords) from Parliament; taxing real estates passing by descent ("death duties" as they came to be known in Britain); ending the presumption of primogeniture (Ensor accounted the suppression of gavelkind as "greatest evil" the Norman Conquest visited upon England); admitting women to their share of inheritance, and recognising tenant right.

In The Poor and Their Relief (1825), Ensor had argued that, as their wages "seldom exceed their necessities", "labouring people should be exempted from all taxation whatever". Taxation "should exclusively fall on the opulent".

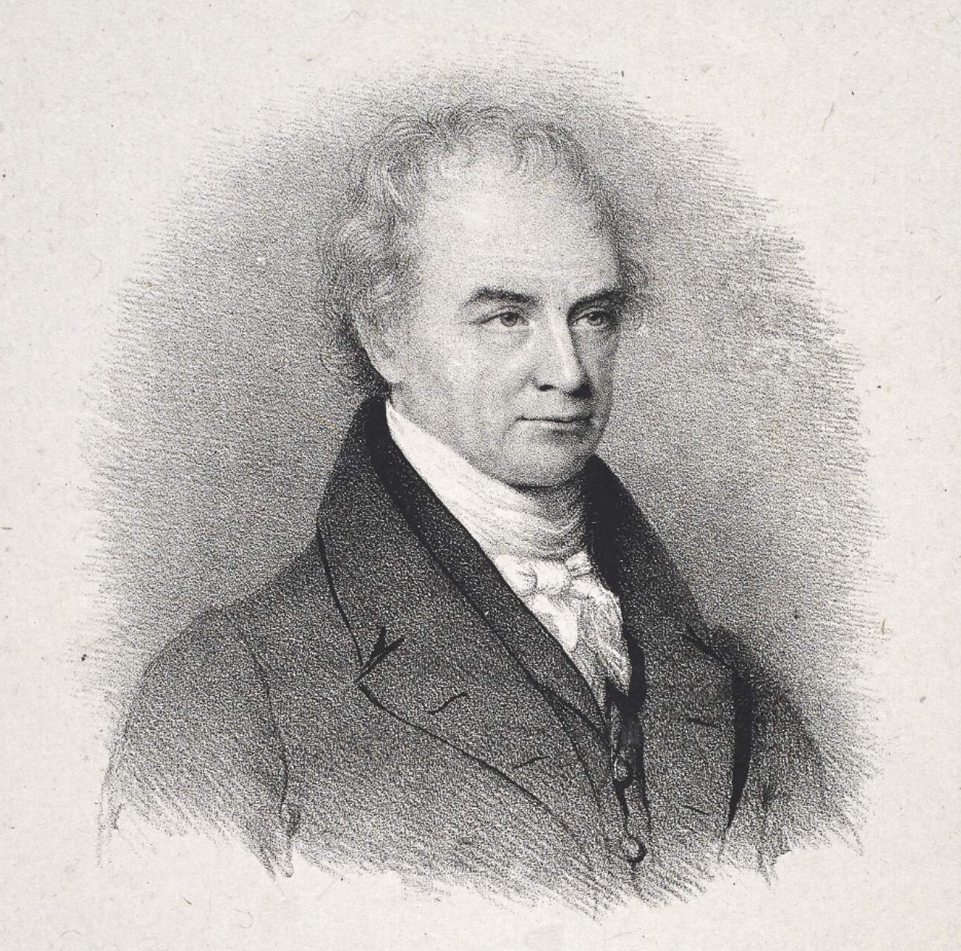
Portrait of George Ensor, lithograph by Bernard Mulrenin

=== For emancipation and reform—break with O'Connell ===
Ensor was among the first Armagh members of the Catholic Association. This was a notable position for a Protestant in a county renowned as a stronghold of the Orange Order and the Brunswick Clubs. As described by Ensor, these were associations of "illiberals" whose "loyalty" to the Crown rests on the impunity to exclude, "abuse and insult" their Catholic fellow countrymen.

In Armagh, Ensor did have an unexpected ally: the sitting MP Charles Brownlow recanted his Orange Order opposition to emancipation, and was successfully returned to Westminster for the county in the general election of 1826. Loyalist opposition, however, was sufficiently intimidating that Ensor and a coterie of Ulster reformers around Lord Rossmore had to abandon plans to build on this success with a provincial meeting to be convened, as they imagined, in the patriotic spirit of the Irish Volunteers.

In 1828, Daniel O'Connell, the leader of the Catholic Association, debated with Jeremy Bentham allowing Ensor to stand with O'Connell as a running mate in the County Clare by-election. (Enjoying the confidence of Bentham, Ensor had accompanied the young John Stuart Mill to Paris in 1820). The by-election was to be a decisive test of the government's revolve to uphold the oaths of allegiance, supremacy and abjuration that barred Catholics from higher office and from Parliament. But Ensor had criticised O'Connell's willingness to accept "disenfranchisement project" attached to the compromise Catholic relief bill. The Parliamentary Elections (Ireland) Act 1829, which received its royal assent on the same day as the Roman Catholic Relief Act, raised the freehold qualification for the county vote in Ireland fivefold to English ten-pound level.

In letters to the press, Ensor cautioned that "relief" bought at the price of "casting two or three million" forty-shilling freeholders, both Catholic and Protestant, "into the abyss", might allow a few Catholic barristers to attain a higher grade in their profession, and a few Catholic gentlemen to be returned to Parliament, but the "indifference" demonstrated to parliamentary reform would prove "disastrous" for the country. (In Armagh, "Emancipation" reduced a county electorate of over 8,000 by three quarters so that even after the Reform, and the Representation of the People (Ireland), acts of 1832, it stood at just 3,487).

In the end O'Connell stood for the Clare seat alone. He described Ensor as "a man of pure principle and excellent notions", although, "if a Christian at all, certainly not a Catholic", and a radical rather than [as most of O'Connell's Protestant and English friends] a Whig.

O'Connell sought rationalise the disenfranchisement of so many of the tenants who, in defiance of their landlords, had voted for him: the new ten-pound franchise might actually "give more power to Catholics by concentrating it in more reliable and less democratically dangerous hands". Ensor, meanwhile, described their abandonment as a "crime ... against the whole Irish people [for which] wretches are found to applaud, corrupted or cajoled by insidious agents of our ancient enemy".

=== For an Irish parliament and universal suffrage ===
In an appeal to Catholics and Protestants as Irishmen, "linked inseparably together, by your common rights and your uncommon wrongs", Ensor did join O'Connell in calling for repeal of the Act of Union. As the proprietor from 1803 of the Ardress estate he had served on the Armagh county grand jury (the local government board) and in 1806 held the honorary office of county sheriff. But in 1828, he refused to accept appointment as a justice of the peace.

Did we enjoy a domestic legislature, I might in some measure, compromise my aversion to partiality and misrule. But while the UNION, which deprives the nation of its revenue, and the people of its legislature continues, I should consider myself by accepting office, accessory to the misery and degradation of my country.

In Anti-Union, Ireland as She Ought to Be (1831), Ensor maintained, not only that "England has always treated Ireland insidiously, enviously, destructively; [so that] so long as the Union continues Ireland must be poor and disturbed", but that England too is injured. Irish political considerations and the increased opportunity for corruption afforded by Irish representation at Westminster compromise the cause of civil liberty and impede parliamentary reform.

In an 1831 Commons debate on the Reform Bill, O'Connell claimed that George Ensor, "one of the most intelligent and clever advocates of the Repeal of the Union", had called on the people of Ireland "to oppose Reform, as likely to raise up obstacles" to Repeal. In the event, Ensor professed himself unimpressed by the "pageant of reform" in Britain. The Reform Act 1832 had left the peoples of Britain and Ireland reason yet to envy France where the right to vote, albeit still tied to property, was exercised by secret ballot (out of sight of landlord and employer), and was undiluted by hereditary and ecclesiastical legislators.

Ensor's own "Plan of Reform" was for "all adults" to have an equal right to elect their legislators. As first proposed in his treatise On National Government (1810) (a work forwarded to Thomas Jefferson by Ensor's Trinity College classmate and United Irish exile, William Sampson), this was based on the confidence that:

Most people know in the main what is good for them. The savage would not be kidnapped—the slave would be emancipated—and all men, whatever would be their race, sect or colour would be free, and would enjoy the means of securing their freedom.

=== For the disestablishment of Christianity ===
Acknowledged as having "attacked Christianity" in his treatise On National Education, in 1811 Ensor had elicited a public response: A Letter to George Ensor, Esq: To which are Added, Reasons for Being a Christian from the leading Protestant divine, the Rev. Edward Ryan, and in "An Ensorian Essay on Something" both a parody and a rebuke in the pages of the Tory monthly, The Scourge. Undeterred, albeit under a pseudonym (Christian Emmanuel) in Janus or Sion; or, Past and to Come, published in ten editions between 1816 and 1826, and, in 1835, under his own name, in a larger work, A Review of the Miracles, Prophecies, & Mysteries of the Old and New Testaments and of the Morality and Consolation of the Christian Religion, Ensor pressed forward with a polemic his critics considered both crass and blasphemous.

Ensor not only found "the moral doctrines of the Christian religion, for which it is so rapturously applauded", resting on wholly contradictory and inconsistent scripture and teaching. He argued that questions of morality were themselves "incidental" to a faith in salvation through Jesus Christ. Together with reason, liberty and happiness, for the Christian divines morality is a "mundane and merely philosophical" topic. The result is:

[a priesthood that] require their followers apostolically to sacrifice temporal for eternal concerns; and labour incessantly to appropriate to themselves all the good things of the earth in order to prevent their flock from sinning, and suffering by their enjoyments.

Unbeliever notwithstanding, Ensor was engaged as a lawyer by James Warren Doyle, the Roman Catholic Bishop of Kildare and Leighlin. He was to investigate reports of hundreds of conversions to the reformed faith on the estate in Cavan of proselytising Orangeman, Lord Farnham. Ensor's reports assured the bishop that, such as they were, the conversions were a case of "souperism" and would not survive the near-famine conditions.

There followed Letters showing the inutility, and exhibiting the absurdity, of what is rather fantastically termed "the new Reformation" (1828), Ensor's broadside against the evangelical revival that had spurred Protestant "home missions" to Irish peasantry. Insisting that "the Bible without note or comment . . . be a schoolbook", the campaign, which began with the Scripture Education Movement led by William Magee, the Church of Ireland Archbishop of Dublin, had also upended the government's conciliatory plans, broadly supported by Doyle, for a non-denominational system of primary education. That the Protestant clergy in Ireland should have obstructed "educating socially and religiously all the people in a common school", for Ensor was further evidence that a religious establishment is "inherently pernicious in all its relations".

== Death and legacy ==
Ensor died on 3 December 1843 at the family home, Ardress House, which is now property of the National Trust.

Conservative reviewers accused Ensor of an excessive and ridiculous "pedantry", and, among radical pamphleteers, classed him as a writer of the second rank—as an imitator of William Cobbett and of Thomas Paine. His "flimsy sophistry" could satisfy only those "already enlisted under the banner of disaffection". But they did not feel that Ensor's work could go unanswered.

Such was his reputation that in 1821, John Cartwright had proposed to Bentham that with "our friend Ensor" they assume leadership of the reform movement. With Sir Francis Burdett and three others, they should constitute themselves as the "seven wise men", Guardians of Constitutional Reform. Their reports and observations would "concern the entire Democracy or Commons of the United Kingdom". (For his part, counting himself a comparative "nonentity", Bentham declined the honour).

Ensor was read by Karl Marx. Describing Ensor as "a political economist of English origin", and as a Protestant who "being himself indifferent to religious matters ... can be witty in defending Catholicism", he recommended his pamphlets to Friedrich Engels. They contained "all sorts of piquant things". Marx recalled, in the first volume of Capital, citing an example. In his anti-Malthusian polemic, Ensor had suggested that in the Highland clearances Scottish grandees effected what the Mongols in China had only contemplated: "to exterminate the inhabitants and convert the land into pasture".

Today a "neglected" figure, Ensor had sufficient renown in his lifetime for a recent history of Irish thought to class him with his radical contemporaries William Thompson (whose Inquiry into the Principles of the Distribution of Wealth also receives an honorary mention in Capital), Thompson's sometime collaborator, the radical feminist Anna Doyle Wheeler, and the holistic philosopher Henry MacCormac. With Ensor, they all shared connections to Bentham and to Mill. An extract from Ensor's On the State of Europe in January 1816, in which he decries the restoration of divine-right monarchy, has been included in a collection of texts —Romanticism and Politics, 1789-1832 (2007)—illustrating the development of radical debate in Britain in the decades following the French Revolution.

== Works ==
- Principles of Morality (1801)
- The Independent Man (1806)
- On National Government (2 vols., 1810)
- On National Education (1811)
- Defects of the English Laws and Tribunals (1812)
- Observations on the present state of Ireland (1814)
- Janus on Sion, or Past and to Come (1816)
- An Inquiry Concerning the Population of Nations containing a Refutation of Mr. Malthus's Essay on Population (1818)
- Radical Reform: Restoration of Usurped Rights (1819)
- Address to the People of Ireland on the Degradation and Misery of their Country (1823)
- The Poor and their relief (1825)
- A Defence of the Irish and the Means of their Redemption (1825)
- Irish Affairs at the Close of 1825 (1826)
- Letters showing the inutility, and exhibiting the absurdity, of what is rather fantastically termed "the new Reformation" (1828)
- Anti-Union, Ireland as She Ought to Be (1831)
- A Review of the Miracles, Prophecies, & Mysteries of the Old and New Testaments and of the Morality and Consolation of the Christian Religion (1835).
- Natural Theology: The Arguments of Paley, Brougham, and the Bridgewater Treatises on this Subject Examined (1836).
- Before and After the Reform Bill (1842)
- Of property and of its equal distribution as promoting virtue, population, abundance (1844)
