= James P. Walsh =

James Patrick Walsh (born 1953) is an American organizational theorist, and professor of Business Administration at the University of Michigan, noted for his contributions in the field of organizational memory and organizational learning. With Ungson (1991) he provided the first integrative framework for thinking about organizational memory.

== Biography ==
Walsh obtained his BA at the University at Albany, SUNY in 1975 and his MA two years later from Columbia University in 1977. In 1980 he obtained a second MA from the University of Chicago and in 1985 he received his PhD at Northwestern University.

Walsh started his academic career in 1984 as adjunct assistant professor at the Amos Tuck School of Business Administration at Dartmouth College, and worked his way up to assistant professor in 1985, associate professor in 1989 and associate professor granted tenure in 1991. In 1991, Walsh moved to the University of Michigan, where he started as associate professor and was appointed professor in 1996. In 1999, he was also appointed Gerald and Esther Carey Professor of Management, and in 2009, Arthur F. Thurnau Professor.

He has been a visiting professor at the Hong Kong University of Science and Technology (1997), the Australian Graduate School of Management (2006), the Charles H. Lundquist College of Business (2012), the University of Western Australia Business School (2013), the Koç University Graduate School of Business (2013) the Vlerick Business School in Belgium (2013), INSEAD (2013), and the University of Pretoria (2019). From 2015 to 2019 he was also appointed Extraordinary Professor at the University of Pretoria, and in 2012 was elected a fellow at the Centre for Business Ethics, Gordon Institute of Business Science in Johannesburg, South Africa.

Since the 1980s, Walsh has published numerous articles concerning topics such as the state of his profession, corporation in society, corporate governance, managerial and organizational cognition, and on other interests.

In 2013, the Academy of Management gave Walsh the Academy of Management Career Achievement Award, Distinguished Service Award, and in 2020 the Distinguished Scholar Award, Managerial and Organizational Cognition Division. In 2017 the International Humanistic Management Association gave him the Leadership in Humanistic Management award, and the University of Michigan gave him the Victor L. Bernard Teaching Leadership Award.

== Selected publications ==
=== Books ===
- Paul Shrivastava, James P. Walsh, Anne S. Huff (eds.). Organizational learning and strategic management. Advances in Strategic Management. Volume 14. Greenwich, CT: JAI Press, 1999.
- Margolis, Joshua Daniel, and James P. Walsh. People and profits?: The search for a link between a company's social and financial performance. Psychology Press, 2001
- Walsh, J.P. and Brief, A. P. (eds.) Academy of Management Annals. Mahwah, NJ: Lawrence Erlbaum and Associates. 2007-2011.

=== Articles, a selection ===
- Walsh, James P. "Top management turnover following mergers and acquisitions." Strategic management journal 9.2 (1988): 173-183.
- Walsh, James P; Ungson, Gerardo Rivera (1991). "Organizational Memory". The Academy of Management Review. 16 (1): 57–91
- Walsh, James P. "Managerial and organizational cognition: Notes from a trip down memory lane." Organization science 6.3 (1995): 280-321.
- Margolis, Joshua D. and James P. Walsh. "Misery loves companies: Rethinking social initiatives by business." Administrative science quarterly 48.2 (2003): 268-305.
- Margolis, Joshua D., Hillary Anger Elfenbein, and James P. Walsh. "Does it pay to be good... and does it matter? A meta-analysis of the relationship between corporate social and financial performance." SSRN Electronic Journal, 2009. 1-68. https://doi.org/10.2139/ssrn.1866371
- Donaldson, Thomas, and James P. Walsh. "Toward a theory of business." Research in Organizational Behavior 35 (2015): 181-207.
