= Peter Walsh (sports broadcaster) =

Australian sports commentator

Peter Walsh is a sports commentator for ABC Radio Grandstand and is based in Adelaide, Australia.

== Early life/career ==
Walsh grew up in Ballarat, Victoria and had a passion for sport from a very early age.

His first media job was working in radio at Ballarat station 3BA, where he covered junior football and was then given the chance to write for the Ballarat Courier newspaper.

He is known for his love of the Hawthorn Football Club and has hosted three counts for the club.

== Sport coverage ==
He covered sport in Ballarat and Bendigo for five years, before being approached by the ABC to cover VFL football in Melbourne and called his first match during the season of 1978 Fitzroy v South Melbourne at the Junction Oval.

In 1981, he secured a spot on the football broadcast team at 3GL (now K Rock) and called football with the great Ted Whitten and was a member of the 3GL team for three years of "bliss" as Peter describes it.

He moved to Tasmania in 1985 after the ABC appointed him to a permanent position where he called Tasmanian Football League matches on 7ZR as well as cricket and the now defunct Tassie Devils NBL basketball matches and has been based in Adelaide since late 1999.

== Major events ==
Some of the major sporting events he has covered include: 1990 World Rowing Championships Tasmania, 1990 Commonwealth Games Auckland, 1992 Summer Olympics Barcelona, 1994 Cricket tour of Pakistan, 1996 Olympic Games Atlanta, 1998 Commonwealth Games Kuala Lumpur, 1999 Cricket tour of Zimbabwe, 2000 Olympic Games Sydney, 2000 Paralympic Games Sydney, 2002 Commonwealth Games Manchester, 2004 Olympic Games Greece.

This also includes countless Australian rules football matches at VFL and AFL level, as well as calling international and state cricket.

== Today ==
Walsh has hosted the National Grandstand program on ABC Local Radio and shares this role during the summer, with Sydney-based ABC sports broadcaster Tracey Holmes. Walsh formally hosted alongside Simone Thurtell, although she now works for 1233 ABC Newcastle as a Drive presenter.

He is also known for his "loud shirts" and can often been seen chasing international cricketers around the Adelaide Oval during Test cricket matches offering them an opportunity to photographed wearing one of the shirts.

Walsh also commentates on National Basketball League home matches for the Adelaide 36ers. He is known for his rowdy and excitable style of commentary akin to the manner of a boxing announcer, particularly after a player has made a flamboyant or attacking action.
