= Colin Walsh =

Colin Walsh may refer to:

- Colin Walsh (baseball) (born 1989), American baseball player
- Colin Walsh (footballer) (born 1962), Scottish footballer
- Colin Walsh (organist), English organist
- Colin Walsh (hurler) (born 2003), Irish hurler

== See also ==
- Colin Walshe (born 1990), Gaelic footballer
