= Christopher Walsh =

Christopher or Chris Walsh may refer to:

- Christopher A. Walsh, professor of neurology
- Christopher T. Walsh, biochemist at Harvard Medical School
- Chris Walsh (American football) (born 1968), American football player
- Chris Walsh (cricketer) (born 1975), English cricketer
- Chris Walsh (politician) (1951-2018), American architect and politician
- Chris Walsh (rugby league) (born 1962), Australian rugby league footballer

== See also ==
- Christy Walsh (disambiguation)
- Chris Welsh (disambiguation)
