= Sheila Walsh =

Sheila Walsh may refer to:

- Sheila Walsh (novelist) (1928-2009), British romance novelist
- Sheila Walsh (singer) (born 1956), Scottish-born American Contemporary Christian vocalist, songwriter, speaker, author and talk-show host.
- Sheila Bellush (1962-1997), murder victim (born Sheila Leigh Walsh)
