= Bertram John Walsh =

American mathematician

Bertram John Walsh (born 7 May 1938) is an American mathematician, specializing in locally convex spaces, harmonic analysis, and partial differential equations.

After receiving his bachelor's degree from Aquinas College in Grand Rapids, Walsh received in 1960 his master's degree and in 1963 his PhD from the University of Michigan. His doctoral dissertation Structures of Spectral Measures on Locally Convex Spaces was written under the supervision of Helmut H. Schaefer. In the 1960s Walsh was a member of the mathematics faculty at UCLA. He moved to Rutgers University, where he is now a professor emeritus.

In 1974 he was an Invited Speaker with talk The Theory of Harmonic Spaces at the International Congress of Mathematicians in Vancouver.

== Selected publications ==
- Schaefer, H. H.; Walsh, B. J. (1962). "Spectral operators in spaces of distributions". Bulletin of the American Mathematical Society. 68 (5): 509–512. doi:10.1090/S0002-9904-1962-10798-8. ISSN 0002-9904.
- Walsh, Bertram (1965). "Banach algebras of scalar-type elements". Proceedings of the American Mathematical Society. 16 (6): 1167–1170. doi:10.1090/S0002-9939-1965-0187109-4.
- Walsh, Bertram (1965). "Structure of spectral measures on locally convex spaces". Transactions of the American Mathematical Society. 120 (2): 295. doi:10.1090/S0002-9947-1965-0196503-1.
- Loeb, Peter; Walsh, Bertram (1965). "The equivalence of Harnack's principle and Harnack's inequality in the axiomatic system of Brelot". Annales de l'Institut Fourier. 15 (2): 597–600. doi:10.5802/aif.224.
- Walsh, Bertram (1966). "Spectral decomposition of quasi-Montel spaces". Proceedings of the American Mathematical Society. 17 (6): 1267–1271. doi:10.1090/S0002-9939-1966-0205079-8.
- Walsh, Bertram; Loeb, Peter A. (1966). "Nuclearity in axiomatic potential theory". Bulletin of the American Mathematical Society. 72 (4): 685–690. doi:10.1090/S0002-9904-1966-11557-4.
- Bear, Herbert; Walsh, Bertram (1967). "Integral kernel for one-part function spaces". Pacific Journal of Mathematics. 23 (2): 209–215. doi:10.2140/pjm.1967.23.209. ISSN 0030-8730.
- Loeb, Peter; Walsh, Bertram (1968). "A maximal regular boundary for solutions of elliptic differential equations". Annales de l'Institut Fourier. 18: 283–308. doi:10.5802/aif.284.
- Walsh, Bertram (1970). "Perturbation of harmonic structures and an index-zero theorem". Annales de l'Institut Fourier. 20: 317–359. doi:10.5802/aif.344.
- Kwon, Y. K.; Sario, Leo; Walsh, Bertram (1971). "Behavior of biharmonic functions on Wiener's and Royden's compactifications". Annales de l'Institut Fourier. 21 (3): 217–226. doi:10.5802/aif.387. ISSN 0373-0956.
- Walsh, Bertram (1971). "Mutual absolute continuity of sets of measures". Proceedings of the American Mathematical Society. 29 (3): 506–510. doi:10.1090/S0002-9939-1971-0279275-X.
- Walsh, Bertram (1971). "Operator Theory of Degenerate Elliptic-Parabolic Equations". Indiana University Mathematics Journal. 20 (10): 959–964. doi:10.1512/iumj.1971.20.20090. JSTOR 24890220.
- Walsh, Bertram (1974). "Positive approximate identities and lattice-ordered dual spaces". Manuscripta Mathematica. 14: 57–63. doi:10.1007/BF01637622. S2CID 123079857.
- Walsh, Bertram (1974). "An approximation property characterizes ordered vector spaces with lattice-ordered duals". Bulletin of the American Mathematical Society. 80 (6): 1165–1169. doi:10.1090/S0002-9904-1974-13658-X.
- Nussbaum, Roger D.; Walsh, Bertram (1998). "Approximation boy polynomials with nonnegative coefficients and the spectral theory of positive operators". Transactions of the American Mathematical Society. 350 (6): 2367–2392. doi:10.1090/S0002-9947-98-01998-9. ISSN 0002-9947.
