= David Walsh (Tipperary Gaelic footballer) =

Irish Gaelic footballer

Personal information
- Native name: Daithí Breathnach (Irish)
- Born: 1966 (age 59–60) County Tipperary, Ireland

Sport
- Sport: Gaelic football
- Position: Right corner-back
Club
- Years: Club
- Arravale Rovers
Club titles
- Tipperary titles: 1
Inter-county
- Years: County
- 1987: Tipperary
Inter-county titles
- Munster titles: 0
- All-Irelands: 0
- NFL: 0
- All Stars: 0

David Walsh (born 1966) is an Irish Gaelic footballer who played as a right corner-back for the Tipperary senior team.

Born in County Tipperary, Walsh first arrived on the inter-county scene at the age of sixteen when he first linked up with the Tipperary minor team before later joining the under-21 side. Walsh joined the senior panel during the 1987 championship.

At club level Walsh is a one-time championship medallist with Arravale Rovers. He retired from inter-county football following the conclusion of the 1987 championship.

== Honours ==
=== Player ===
Arravale Rovers

- Tipperary Senior Football Championship (1): 1985

Tipperary

- Munster Minor Football Championship (1): 1984
