= Senator Walsh =

Senator Walsh may refer to:

== Members of the United States Senate ==
- Arthur Walsh (U.S. senator) (1896–1947), U.S. Senator from New Jersey from 1943 to 1944
- David I. Walsh (1872–1947), U.S. Senator from Massachusetts from 1926 to 1947
- John Walsh (Montana politician) (born 1960), U.S. Senator from Montana from 2014 to 2015
- Patrick Walsh (Southern U.S. politician) (1840–1899), U.S. Senator from Georgia from 1894 to 1895
- Thomas J. Walsh (1859–1933), U.S. Senator from Montana from 1913 to 1933

== United States state senate members ==
- Gina Walsh (born 1957), Missouri State Senate
- Jack Walsh (politician) (fl. 2010s), Delaware State Senate
- John Carroll Walsh (1816–1894), Maryland State Senate
- John Jackson Walsh (1871–1949), Massachusetts State Senate
- John M. Walsh (born 1940), Iowa State Senate
- Larry Walsh (1948–2020), Illinois State Senate
- Marian Walsh (born 1954), Massachusetts State Senate
- Maureen Walsh (born 1960), Washington State Senate
- Mike Walsh (politician) (fl. 2020s), South Dakota State Senate
- Patrick Walsh (Michigan politician) (1892–1978), Michigan State Senate
- Patrick Walsh (Wisconsin politician) (1830–1888), Wisconsin State Senate
- R. Jay Walsh (1854–1916), Connecticut State Senate
- Richard A. Walsh (1930–2005), Illinois State Senate
- Thomas J. Walsh (New York politician) (1892–1955), New York State Senate
- William E. Walsh (Oregon politician) (1903–1975), Oregon State Senate
