= James Walsh (hurler) =

Irish hurler

Personal information
- Native name: Séamas Breathnach (Irish)
- Born: 13 December 1983 (age 42)
- Occupation: Teacher
- Height: 5 ft 9 in (175 cm)

Sport
- Sport: Hurling
- Position: Midfield
Club
- Years: Club
- Ballinakill
Inter-county
- Years: County
- Laois
Inter-county titles
- Leinster titles: 0
- All-Irelands: 0
- NHL: 1 (div 2)
- All Stars: 0

James Walsh (born 13 December 1983) is an Irish hurler from Ballinakill in Laois. He plays in midfield for Ballinakill and for Laois. He is also the captain for Laois.
