= James Walsh (physician) =

Irish deputy chief medical officer

Deputy Chief Medical Officer of Ireland

Personal details
- Born: 21 November 1923
- Died: 30 May 2018 (aged 94)
- Spouse(s): Nancy O’Brien (first); Patricia (second)
- Children: 3
- Education: Royal College of Surgeons in Ireland; University College Dublin

James "Jimmy" H. Walsh (21 November 1923 – 30 May 2018) was an Irish medical doctor and former Deputy Chief Medical Officer to the Government of Ireland.

== Background ==
Walsh was born in Dublin, Ireland to Ena Warren and James Walsh from County Wexford. Jimmy's grandfather, also named James Walsh, was a dispensary doctor who had founded a fever hospital and inspired Jimmy to study medicine. Walsh attended Castleknock College before studying undergraduate medicine at the Royal College of Surgeons in Ireland and later public health at University College Dublin.

== Career ==
Walsh and his wife, Nancy, emigrated to England in the 1950s where Walsh worked for the National Health Service. After returning to Ireland, Walsh was appointed medical inspector at the Department of Health where he later became Deputy Chief Medical Officer. In 1976, he co-founded the Royal College of Physicians of Ireland Faculty of Public Health Medicine, of which he was later made Dean. He was involved in the development of Cork University Hospital and Beaumont Hospital.

== Personal life ==
In 1953, Walsh married Nancy O'Brien, a nurse from Ferns, County Wexford whom he had met that year at the Meath Hospital. They had 3 children - Paul, Ann, and James - who were born in England. When Nancy was diagnosed with breast cancer, the family return to Ireland, where Nancy died in June 1964. Walsh later remarried and his second wife, Patricia, died in 2005.

Government offices
Preceded by ?	Deputy Chief Medical Officer for Ireland ? - 1998	Succeeded by ?
