= Alan Walsh =

Alan or Allan Walsh may refer to:

- Alan Walsh (footballer) (born 1956), retired English footballer
- Alan Walsh (physicist) (1916–1998), British physicist
- Alan Walsh (hurler) (born 2002), Irish hurler and Gaelic footballer
- Allan Walsh (Australian politician) (1940–2013), Australian politician
- Allan B. Walsh (1874–1953), American politician from New Jersey
