= Richard Ambrose Walsh =

American politician (1862–1940)

Richard Ambrose Walsh (January 9, 1862 – January 18, 1940) was an American lawyer, judge, and politician.

Walsh was born in Saint Paul, Minnesota and went to the Saint Paul Public Schools. He read law and was admitted to the Minnesota Bar in 1883. He lived in Saint Paul, Minnesota with his wife and family where he practiced law. Walsh served in the Minnesota House of Representatives from 1891 to 1894 as a Democrat. He then served as a Ramsey County, Minnesota District Court Judge from 1931 to 1939. He died in Saint Paul, Minnesota.

In 1884 he married Margaret McManus. They had thirteen children together. It was at the family's second home at White Bear Lake that tragedy struck on September 9, 1909. The house burned to the ground and three of the Walsh children - John, Robert and Angela - died in the flames.
