= Hillary Anger Elfenbein =

Professor of organizational behavior

- Known for: Research on recognizing emotions across cultures and emotion in the workplace

Academic background
- Education: Harvard University
- Thesis: Accuracy in communicating emotion in the workplace : a field research investigation (2001)
- Website: https://hillaryangerelfenbein.com/

Hillary Anger Elfenbein is the John and Ellen Wallace Distinguished Professor of Organizational Behavior at Washington University in St. Louis, known for her research on emotion in the workplace and cross-cultural differences in emotion.

== Education ==
Elfenbein received undergraduate degrees from Harvard University in physics and Sanskrit and Indian studies. She also earned an M.A. in Statistics and a Ph.D. in Organizational Behavior jointly between the Department of Psychology and Harvard Business School.

== Career ==
After graduating with her bachelor's degrees, Elfenbein took a position as a management consultant at Monitor Company in Cambridge (1994–1996). Following her Ph.D. Elfenbein was a Senior Researcher at the Harvard Business School (2001–2003) and an assistant professor at the University of California, Berkeley (2003–2008). In 2008 she moved to the Olin Business School at Washington University in St. Louis, where she was promoted to professor in 2010 and to the John and Ellen Wallace Distinguished Professor in 2016.

== Research ==
Elfenbein is known for her research in emotion in the workplace, negotiation, and the recognition of emotion across cultures. Her early work described cultural differences in emotions, and how that controls people's ability to evaluate emotions. She has reviewed emotions in the workplace, how emotions impact negotiations, and individual's perceptions of negative feelings. Her research includes investigations into people with high emotional intelligence, and she has testified before the Congress about the value of basic research.

== Congressional testimony ==
On June 2, 2011, Elfenbein testified at a United States congressional hearing in front of the United States House Science Subcommittee on Research and Technology. During the congressional oversight hearing, she addressed a need for basic social science research funding in the social, behavioral, and economic sciences.

== Advocacy ==
Since the October 7 attacks in Israel and subsequent 2024 pro-Palestinian protests on university campuses, Elfenbein has been actively engaged in combatting antisemitism at Washington University and has contributed to media outlets regarding the new antisemitism movement in the United States.

== Personal life ==
Elfenbein has been performing stand-up comedy in St. Louis since 2016.
