= B. Timothy Walsh =

American psychiast and academic

- Born: Bernard Timothy Walsh; 1946 (age 79–80); Washington, D.C., US
- Education: Princeton University; Harvard Medical School
- Known for: Research regarding obesity and eating disorders
- Scientific career
- Fields: Psychology, Psychiatry Epidemiology, Public Health, Medicine
- Workplaces: Columbia University; New York State Psychiatric Institute; Columbia University Vagelos College of Physicians and Surgeons

Bernard Timothy Walsh (born 1946) is an American psychiatrist, academic, author, and editor who specializes in eating disorders. He is the William and Joy Ruane Professor of Pediatric Psychopharmacology in the Department of Psychiatry at Columbia University.

== Early life ==
Walsh was born in 1946 in Washington, D.C He attended Princeton University and Harvard Medical School. He completed his residency in psychiatry at the Bronx Municipal Hospital Center in The Bronx, New York.

== Career ==
In 1979, Walsh started the Eating Disorders Research Unit at the New York State Psychiatric Institute and Columbia University Irving Medical Center. He was also the director of the Division of Clinical Therapeutics at New York State Psychiatric Institute.

He is the William and Joy Ruane Professor of Pediatric Psychopharmacology in the Department of Psychiatry at Columbia University. His research covers the psychological and biological causes of abnormal eating behaviors. He has looked for pharmacological and psychological treatments for anorexia nevosa, binge eating disorder, and bulimia nervosa.

He is the author, editor, or co-editor of five books on adolescent health and eating disorders. He was the president of both the Academy for Eating Disorders and the Eating Disorders Research Society. He also chaired the Eating Disorders Work Group for both DSM-IV and DSM-5.

He has received awards from the Academy for Eating Disorders, American Psychiatric Association, the Association for Behavior and Cognitive Therapies, and the National Eating Disorders Association.

== Selected publications ==
=== Books ===
- Next to Nothing A Firsthand Account of One Teenager's Experience with an Eating Disorder. with Carrie Arnold.Oxford: Oxford University Press, 2007. ISBN 978-0195309669

=== Articles ===
- Walsh, B. Timothy; Kaplan, Allan S., Attia, Evelyn; et al. "Fluoxetine after weight restoration in anorexia nervosa: a randomized controlled trial". JAMA vol. 295, no. 22 (June 14, 2006): 2605–12
- Attia, Evelyn and Walsh, B. Timothy. "The Behavioral Management of Anorexia Nervosa". The New England Journal of Medicine, vol. 360, no. 5 (January 29, 2009): 500–506
- Walsh B. Timothy."The importance of eating behavior in eating disorders". Physiology and Behavior, vol. 104, no. 4 (September 26, 2011): 525–529
- Walsh, B. Timothy. "The Enigmatic Persistence of Anorexia Nervosa". American Journal of Psychiatry, vol. 170, no. 5 (May 2013):477–484

=== Chapters ===
- Walsh, B. T. and Attia, Evelyn. "Eating Disorders". in Harrison's Principles of Internal Medicine (18th edition). Longo, D. L.; Fauci, A.S.; et al (eds). New York: McGraw Hill, 2011. ISBN 978-1259029400
- "Eating Disorders". in Merck Manual (Consudmer Version). Rahway, NJ: Merck & Co., 2023.

=== As editor ===
- Child Psychopharmacology. American Psychiatric Publishing Inc; 1998. ISBN 978-0880488334
- Treating and Preventing Adolescent Mental Health Disorders: What We Know and What We Don't Know. Oxford: Oxford University Press. 2005.ISBN 9780195173642
- Handbook of Assessment and Treatment of Eating Disorders. with Evelyn Attia, Robyn Sysko, and Deborah R. Glasofer, editors. American Psychiatric Publishing 2016. ISBN 978-1585625093
- Eating Disorders and Obesity, Third Edition: A Comprehensive Handbook. with Kelly D. Brownell, ed. Guilford Press, 2017. ISBN 9781462536092
