= Edward Walsh (rugby union) =

Irish rugby union player

Personal information
- Nickname: Ned
- Nationality: Irish

Sport
- Sport: Rugby
- College team: Blackrock College
- Club: Lansdowne Football Club

Edward J (Ned) Walsh (1861 – 1939) was an Ireland international rugby union player.

A native of Graiguenahown, Abbeyleix, County Laois, he was the first former Blackrock College student to win an Irish rugby international cap and was capped seven times for Ireland between 1885 and 1893.

He was also a member of Lansdowne Football Club.
