= John A. Kirkwood =

US Army soldier & recipient of Medal of Honor (1851-1930)

- Born: October 29, 1851; Allegheny, Pennsylvania
- Died: May 11, 1930 (aged 78); Washington, D.C.
- Burial place: United States Soldiers' and Airmen's Home National Cemetery
- Military career
- Allegiance: United States
- Branch: United States Army
- Rank: Sergeant
- Unit: 3rd Cavalry Regiment
- Conflicts: Great Sioux War of 1876–77 • Battle of Slim Buttes
- Awards: Medal of Honor

John A. Kirkwood (October 29, 1851 – May 11, 1930) was a United States Army soldier and a recipient of the United States military's highest decoration, the Medal of Honor, for his actions in the Indian Wars of the western United States.

== Biography ==
Kirkwood was born on October 29, 1851, in Allegheny, Pennsylvania (now part of Pittsburgh). Upon joining the Army, he served in the Dakota Territory as a sergeant with Company M, 3rd Cavalry Regiment, during the Great Sioux War of 1876–77.

In the early morning hours of September 9, 1876, two and a half months after George Armstrong Custer's defeat at the Battle of the Little Bighorn, Kirkwood was among 150 soldiers who launched an attack on a Sioux encampment of 35 lodges. The engagement would come to be known as the Battle of Slim Buttes. Early in the attack, Lieutenant Adolphus H. Von Luettwitz was shot in the right kneecap. After another man applied a tourniquet to the officer's leg, Kirkwood carried him over a ridge to safety; Von Luettwitz would survive, although his leg had to be amputated. The soldiers then raided the Sioux village, taking horses and food and discovering artifacts from the previous Battle of the Little Bighorn, including Custer's battle flag. Many of the Sioux retreated to a deep, wooded ravine south of the village and continued firing on the soldiers. Kirkwood and two other men, Blacksmith Albert Glawinsky and Sergeant Edward Glass, attempted to dislodge the Indians from the ravine but were turned back. In the process, Kirkwood was shot in the side and Glass was severely wounded in the arm; Kirkwood's injury proved to be not serious. For these actions, he was awarded the Medal of Honor a year later, on October 16, 1877.

Kirkwood's official Medal of Honor citation reads:

Bravely endeavored to dislodge some Sioux Indians secreted in a ravine.

In 1920, Kirkwood returned to Slim Buttes, near present-day Reva, South Dakota, and helped place a monument commemorating the battle. By August 1928, he was living with his sister, Crissie Kirkwood Willie, in Bellevue, Pennsylvania. He later entered the U.S. Soldiers' Home in Washington, D.C., where he died at age 78 on May 11, 1930. He was buried at the adjacent Soldiers' Home National Cemetery.

Kirkwood's Medal of Honor was passed down through his nieces and nephews until 2010, when the family donated the medal and other artifacts from his military service to the Soldiers and Sailors National Military Museum and Memorial in Pittsburgh.

== See also ==
- List of Medal of Honor recipients during peacetime
