= Attorney General Walsh =

Attorney General Walsh may refer to:

- Robert Walsh (Australian politician) (1824–1899), Attorney-General of Victoria
- William C. Walsh (1890–1975), Attorney General of Maryland

== See also ==
- General Walsh (disambiguation)
