= Denis Walsh =

Denis Walsh may refer to the following people:

- Denis Walsh (dual player) (born 1965), Irish Gaelic games manager and dual player with Cork
- Denis Walsh (Cloughduv hurler) (born 1961), Irish hurler for Cork
- Denis Walsh (Tipperary hurler) (1877–1952), Irish hurler
- Denis M. Walsh, Canadian academic and writer

== See also ==
- Dennis Walsh (1933–2005), English astronomer
- Dennis G. Walsh (born 1965), American bishop of the Catholic Church
