= Judge Walsh =

Judge Walsh may refer to:

- James Augustine Walsh (1906–1991), judge of the United States District Court for the District of Arizona
- Lawrence Walsh (1912–2014), judge of the United States District Court for the Southern District of New York
- Leonard Patrick Walsh (1904–1980), judge of the United States District Court for the District of Columbia

== See also ==
- Justice Walsh (disambiguation)
