= Christy Walsh =

Christy Walsh may refer to:

- Christy Walsh (basketball), Irish basketball player
- Christy Walsh (hurler), Irish sportsperson
- Christy Walsh (sports agent), American businessman
- Christy Walsh case, Belfast man wrongly convicted of possession of explosives

== See also ==
- Christopher Walsh (disambiguation)
- Christie Welsh (born 1981), American soccer player
- Christine Welsh (disambiguation)
