= Robert Walsh (Irish writer) =

Irish clergyman, historian, writer and physician (1772–1852)

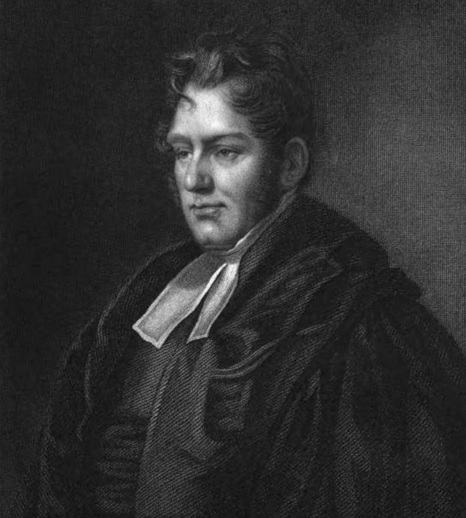
- Born: 1772; Waterford, Ireland
- Died: June 30, 1852 (aged 79–80); County Wicklow, Ireland
- Occupations: Clergyman, historian, writer, physician

The Rev. Robert Walsh, M.D., LL.D, (1772 – 30 June 1852) was an Irish clergyman, historian, writer and physician.

== Life ==
Walsh was born in 1772 in Waterford, Ireland, where many of his ancestors had been chief magistrates. He entered Trinity College Dublin on 2 November 1789, where he was a friend of Robert Emmet and Thomas Moore. He was elected a Scholar in 1794, and graduated B.A. in 1796.

He was ordained a clergyman of the Church of Ireland and was curate of St. Canice's Church, Finglas, in County Dublin, from 1806 to 1820. Here he married Anne, daughter of John Bayly, of Tolka, and here his son John Edward was born.

Robert Walsh published in 1815, in conjunction with John Warburton and the Rev. James Whitelaw (both deceased by then), a History of the City of Dublin in two volumes.

He became chaplain to the British Embassy in St. Petersburg and then in Constantinople in 1820. He was appointed chaplain to the British Embassy in Rio de Janeiro in 1828. He spent 200 days in Brazil, travelling through the country to investigate the conditions of the slaves, and wrote Notices of Brazil in 1828 and 1829, as part of an effort to abolish the slave trade. He urged the setting up of courts wherever there was a British consul, with the right to arrest and try slavers, even if they were not transporting slaves - the owner, master and crew would then be liable to severe punishment as pirates. In this way, he hoped, the trade would no longer be permitted, and "the whole of this ransacked and harassed coast will then be protected and every slaver on any part of it will be seized and tried as a pirate." As it transpired, the foreign slave trade was not abolished until 1850, and it took another thirty years to emancipate the slaves.

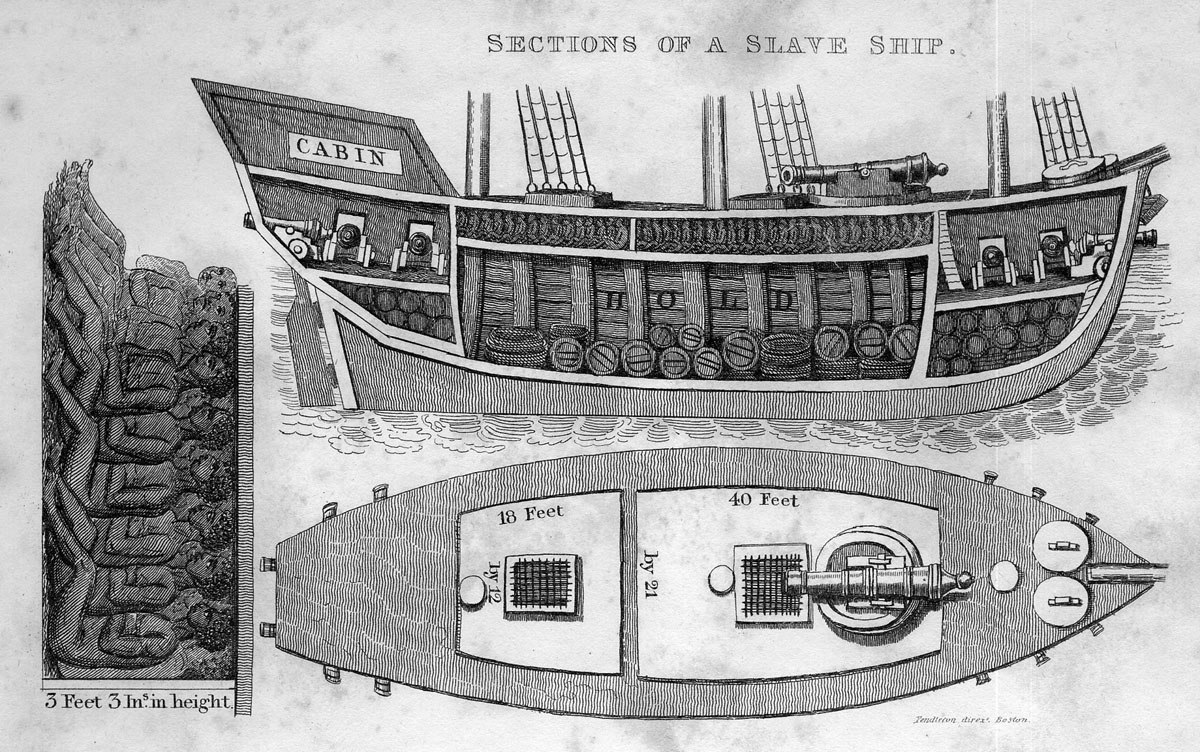
Cross-section of a slave ship, from Walsh's Notices of Brazil in 1828 and 1829

Walsh left Brazil on 4 May 1829. After two weeks on the sea, the captain of his ship spotted a slave ship which he chased for thirty hours, firing shots across its bow which forced it to heave to. After boarding the ship Walsh saw first-hand the terrible conditions in which the slaves were transported. His ship arrived in Portsmouth on 30 June.

Walsh acquired a medical degree and practised for some time as a physician. He returned to Ireland in 1835, where he obtained the living of Kilbride, County Wicklow, and exchanged it for that of his earlier residence at Finglas in 1839, and died there in 1852.

Several generations of his family were interested in archaeology, and Robert Walsh was no exception. He made the discovery of a celebrated ancient cross called the Cross of Nethercross in Finglas. There was a tradition in the village that it had been buried in a certain place, still known to an old man who had heard it from his father. It had been interred to protect it from the fanatical zeal of Cromwell's soldiers. Robert Walsh had an excavation made at the spot indicated, and the cross was disinterred and set up in Finglas churchyard.

Robert Walsh's son, John Edward, became Attorney-General for Ireland and MP for Dublin University. He published in 1847 the popular Ireland Sixty Years Ago, which contained much information procured from his father, from a series of articles written by Robert for the Dublin University Magazine.

Robert Walsh's brother, Edward was also a writer who had a brilliant career as an army surgeon all over the world, before settling in Dublin. His grandson Rev. Robert Walsh MA, Rector of Malahide and Portmarnock was a historian who wrote about the history of the churches in North Dublin.

== Bibliography ==
- History of the City of Dublin (1815)
- An Essay on Ancient Coins, Medals, and Gems (1828)
- Residence at Constantinople during the Greek and Turkish Revolutions, 2 vols. (1836)
- Narrative Of A Journey From Constantinople To England (1828)
- Notices of Brazil in 1828 and 1829 (London 1830; Boston: Richardson, Lord & Holbrook 1831)
- An Account of the Levant Company (1820s)
