= Jimmy Walsh (footballer, born 1954) =

English footballer

Personal information
- Full name: James Thomas Patrick Walsh
- Date of birth: 20 November 1954 (age 71)
- Place of birth: Paddington, England
- Position: Full back

Senior career*
Years	Team	Apps	(Gls)
1972–1978	Watford	65	(0)
1978–1981	York City	99	(2)
1981–1982	Frickley Athletic	13	(1)
1982–1984	Slough Town	23	(0)
1984–?	Windsor & Eton	?	(?)
- * Club domestic league appearances and goals

James Thomas Patrick Walsh (born 20 November 1954) is an English former footballer.

== Career ==
Walsh played as a goalkeeper at school, and after two weeks as a machine operator working as a metal presser, he sold vegetables on Slough market while playing for Britwell Boys Club. He had a five-week trial at Watford and was subsequently signed by manager Ken Furphy as an apprentice, turning professional November 1972.

He left Watford and worked as a driver with his father briefly before joining York City in June 1978. He made his debut in a 1–0 defeat against Wigan Athletic on 23 September 1978 in Division Four. He scored two goals in his Football League career, which both came in York's 2–1 win against Hartlepool United on 5 April 1980. He made 114 appearances and scored two goals during his time with the club.

He went on to play for Frickley Athletic, with whom he made 13 appearances and scored one goal in the league during the 1981–82 season. He joined Slough Town in January 1982 and later went to Windsor & Eton in 1984.
