= Mary E. Walsh =

Mary E. Walsh (prior 1864–?) was an American composer. She is best known for "Black Hawk Waltz," which was popular in the 19th and 20th centuries, and the hymn "Bring Flowers Of The Fairest". She was born near Harleigh, Pennsylvania, probably in the 1840s or 1850s.

Sheet music for her "campaign polka", dedicated to the Philadelphia Liberty Cornet Band in 1864, is archived in the Library of Congress.

She also composed several other hymns.
