= Jim Walsh (Dublin hurler) =

Irish hurler

Jim "Builder" Walsh
Personal information
- Native name: Séamus Breathnach (Irish)
- Nickname: Builder
- Born: 1895 Mooncoin, County Kilkenny, Ireland
- Died: 19 February 1950 (aged 54–55) Dublin, Ireland

Sport
- Sport: Hurling
Clubs
- Years: Club
- 1914-1919 1920-1935: Mooncoin; Faughs
Club titles
- Dublin titles: 5
Inter-county
- Years: County
- 1916-1919 1920-1930: Kilkenny; Dublin
Inter-county titles
- Leinster titles: 7
- All-Irelands: 3
- NHL: 1

Jim "Builder" Walsh (1895 - 19 February 1950) was an Irish hurler who played as a centre-back for the Kilkenny and Dublin senior teams.

Walsh made his first appearance for the Kilkenny team during the 1916 championship, however, he later joined the Dublin team and was a regular player until his retirement after the 1930 championship. During that time he has won three All-Ireland medals, seven Leinster medals and one National Hurling League medal. Walsh was an All-Ireland runner-up on four occasions.

At club level Walsh began his career with Mooncoin, winning three county championship medals. He later played with Faughs in Dublin, winning a further five county championship medals.

Walsh also hurled at international level for Ireland. He was the only player to line out on three Tailteann Games hurling teams.

Sporting positions
Preceded by Mick Gill	Dublin Senior Hurling Captain; 1930	Succeeded by
