= Michaela Walsh =

Michaela Walsh may refer to:

- Michaela Walsh (boxer), Northern Irish boxer
- Michaela Walsh (athlete), Irish hammer thrower and shotputter
- Michaela Walsh (banker), financier, banker, founder and first president of Women's World Banking.
