= Blaine Walsh =

American journalist

- Born: April 17, 1925; Oconto, Wisconsin, U.S.
- Died: September 5, 1985 (aged 60); Sandy Springs, Georgia, U.S.

Blaine Luke Walsh (April 17, 1925 – September 5, 1985) was an American sportscaster, best known as a play-by-play announcer for the Milwaukee Braves baseball team in the National League from 1953 to 1961.

Walsh was born April 17, 1925, in Oconto, Wisconsin. He was described as "a big, funloving guy with a booming bass voice that was tailor-made for radio... He teamed with Earl Gillespie to give Milwaukee a radio broadcasting team that ranked with the best ever." He also worked with Gillespie at Green Bay, broadcasting Green Bay Packers and Wisconsin Badgers football games, and hosted a weekly program with legendary Packers coach Vince Lombardi.

After Walsh was forced out as WTMJ announcer in 1961, he stayed with the Braves as a television announcer, then returned to WTMJ as their radio announcer in 1964. Bud Selig, owner of the Milwaukee Brewers and eventual Commissioner of Baseball, commented on Walsh, "When we were struggling to bring baseball back to Milwaukee after the Braves went to Atlanta, there wasn't anything in the world he wouldn't do for us. You couldn't meet a finer man."

Blaine Walsh's grandson, Dave Garner, was previously the sports director for ETC3 television in Ellijay, Georgia. He is currently the sports director for Carriage Radio stations 101.1 The Pulse and WPGY The Sports Pig in North Georgia and is a member of the broadcast team for Valdosta State Football serving as play-by-play announcer on FloSports.

Blaine’s father was Samuel P. Walsh who served in the Wisconsin State Assembly. Walsh served in the United States Army in Europe during World War II. Walsh died September 5, 1985, in Sandy Springs, Georgia.
