= Martin Walsh =

Martin Walsh may refer to:

- Martin Walsh (film editor) (born 1955), film editor
- Martin Walsh (footballer) (born 1966), Scottish footballer
- Martin Walsh (police officer) (born 1945), Garda Síochána sergeant
- Martin Walsh (producer) (born 1967), film producer
- Martin Walsh (rower) (born 1962), South African Olympic rower
- Marty Walsh (ice hockey, born 1884) (1884–1915), ice hockey player
- Marty Walsh (musician) (born 1952), guitarist
- Marty Walsh (born 1967), former United States Secretary of Labor, former mayor of Boston, current NHLPA head

== See also ==
- Martin Ignatius Welsh (1882–1953), United States district judge
