= Matthew Walsh =

Matthew or Matt Walsh may refer to:

- Matthew Walsh (cyclist) (1887–1975), British Olympic cyclist
- Matt Walsh (basketball) (born 1982), American former basketball player
- Matt Walsh (comedian) (born 1964), American comedian and actor, founding member of the Upright Citizens Brigade
- Matt Walsh (political commentator) (born 1986), American conservative political commentator and show host for The Daily Wire
- Matthew Walsh (writer), Canadian poet

== See also ==
- Matthew Welsh (disambiguation)
