= Justice Walsh =

Justice Walsh may refer to:

- Joseph T. Walsh (1930–2014), associate justice of the Delaware Supreme Court
- Nicholas Walsh (judge) (1542–1615), chief justice of the Irish Common Pleas
- William C. Walsh (1890–1975), associate justice of the Maryland Court of Appeals

== See also ==
- Judge Walsh (disambiguation)
