= General Walsh =

General Walsh may refer to:

- E. Donald Walsh (1917–1997), U.S. Army major general
- Ellard A. Walsh (1887–1975), U.S. Army National Guard major general
- Geoffrey Walsh (1909–1999), Canadian Army lieutenant general
- Hunt Walsh (1720–1795), British Army general
- John Walsh (Montana politician) (born 1960), Montana Army National Guard brigadier general
- Michael Walsh (British Army officer) (1927–2015), British Army major general

== See also ==
- Frederick Walshe (1872–1931), British Army brigadier general
- Attorney General Walsh (disambiguation)
