= Edward Walsh (physician) =

Irish physician

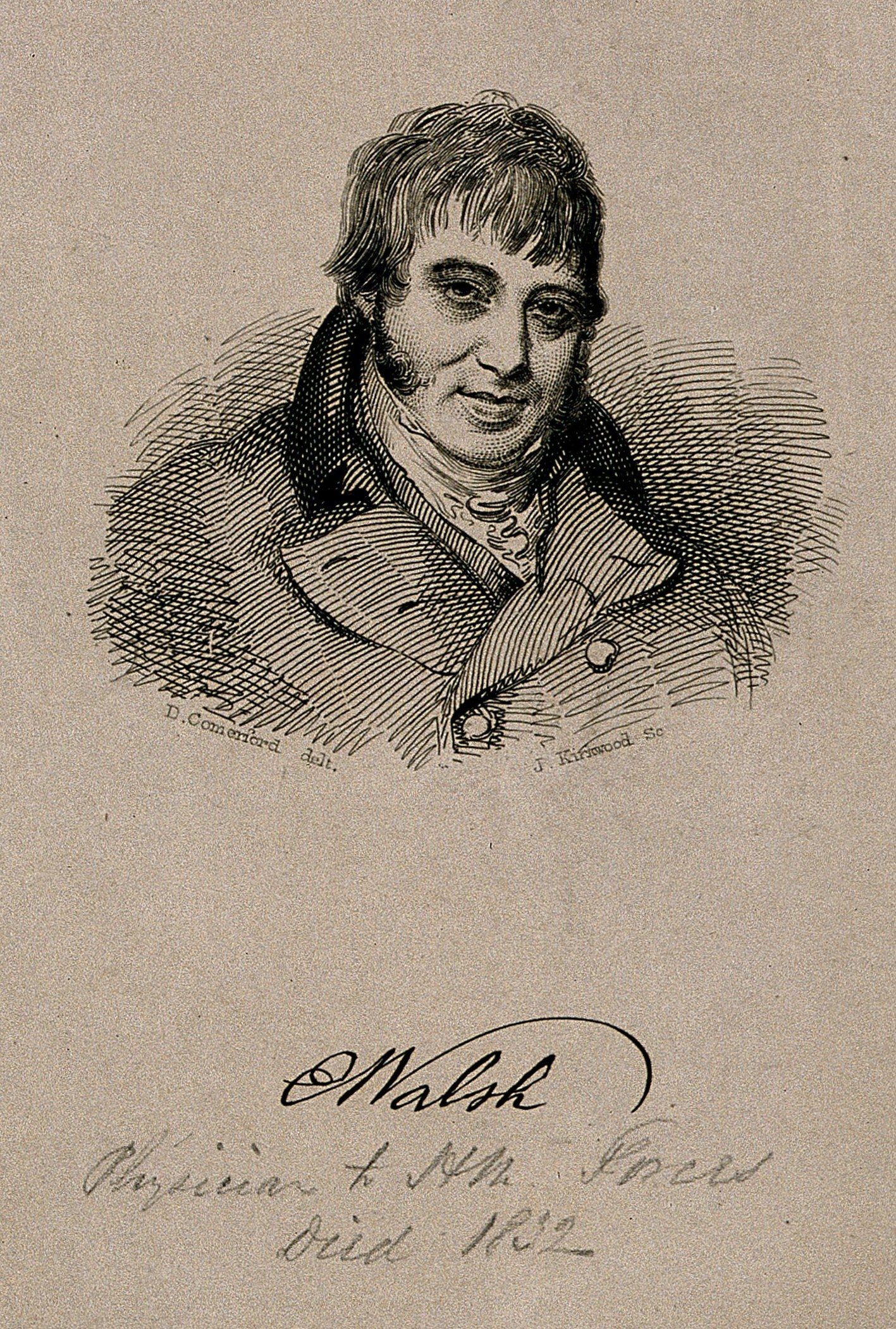
- Born: 1756; Waterford, Ireland
- Died: 7 February 1832 (aged 75–76); Summerhill, Dublin
- Occupation: Physician

Edward Walsh (1756 – 7 February 1832) was an Irish physician.

== Biography ==
Walsh was born in 1756 in Waterford. He was the eldest son of John Walsh, a merchant, of Ballymountain House, co. Waterford. Robert Walsh was his younger brother. After early education at Waterford, he studied medicine at Edinburgh and at Glasgow, where he graduated M.D. in 1791. Before leaving Waterford he founded a literary society there, an account of which by him appeared anonymously in the ‘British Magazine,’ 1830 (ii. 99–105). A poem by him gained a prize of a silver medal offered by this society, and on being appropriated some years after by one of the competitors for the Dublin College Historical Society medal was also successful (Brit. Mag. ii. 100). In 1792 Walsh published a poem, ‘The Progress of Despotism: a Poem on the French Revolution,’ which was dedicated to Charles James Fox. In the ‘Anthologia Hibernica’ he published about the same time a proposal for a universal alphabet. While a student in Edinburgh he published several sketches of some merit, one of which (a view of the side of Calton Hill on which a facial resemblance to Nelson could at that time be traced) appeared in ‘Ackerman's Repository.’

Walsh began his professional career as medical officer on a West Indian packet. He was afterwards physician to the forces in Ireland, being present at the battles in Wexford in 1798, and at the surrender of Humbert at Ballinamuck. He also served in Holland in 1799, and at the attack on Copenhagen (2 April 1801), where his hand was shattered. He was afterwards sent with the 49th regiment to Canada, where he spent some years studying Indian life. He collected a vast amount of information for a statistical history of Canada, but never published the work. He was present during most of the battles in the Peninsular war, and at Waterloo, and also served in the Walcheren expedition. He held for some time the post of president of the medical board at Ostend. He died on 7 February 1832 at Summerhill, Dublin.

He published a ‘Narrative of the Expedition to Holland’ (London, 1800, 4to), and a collection of poems entitled ‘Bagatelles’ (1793); and wrote for the ‘Edinburgh Medical Journal,’ the ‘Amulet,’ &c. A portrait of him was painted by John Comerford, and an engraving of it appeared in the ‘Dublin University Magazine’ (1834, vol. iii.).
