= John Kirkwood (engraver) =

Scottish engraver

John Kirkwood (died 1853) was a Scottish engraver who lived in Dublin from about 1826 until 1845 during which time he became the foremost engraver in the city.

He was the son of James Kirkwood (1746–1827), a member of a Scottish family of engravers, who gained some notoriety in Scotland as it was a fire in their workshop that started the Great Fire of Edinburgh on 15 November 1824.

Kirkwood accompanied his father to Dublin in about 1826. For more than a decade John Kirkwood was the foremost engraver in Dublin and was in demand for his engraving of book illustrations. He retired in 1845 and returned to Edinburgh, where he died in 1853. After his retirement his son George, who had been working with him, continued in the family firm of John Kirkwood and Son.
