= Samuel Walsh (artist) =

Irish abstract artist (born 1951)

- Born: 17 September 1951 (age 74); Wimbledon, London, England
- Occupation: Artist
- Spouse: Ursula Brick
- Children: 3
- Parent(s): Thomas 'Tommy' Walsh and Margaret 'Gladys' Hanley

Samuel Walsh is an Irish abstract artist. He is a member of Aosdána, founder of the National Collection of Contemporary Drawing and is closely associated with the beginnings of EVA International. Born in London in 1951 to Irish parents, he moved to Limerick, Ireland in 1968, where he resided until 1990. He now lives and works in Clonlara, Co. Clare.

== Biography ==
=== Early life ===
Walsh was born in Wimbledon, London on 17 September 1951, to Irish parents. His father, Thomas 'Tommy' Walsh, was originally from Ennis, Co. Clare, Ireland and his mother Margaret 'Gladys' Walsh was originally from Limerick, Ireland. He spent his early years living near Wandsworth Common and was schooled in Spencer Park School (closed 1985). Walsh's family returned to Ireland, while he continued to live and study in London. He joined his family in Limerick, Ireland in 1968. Upon relocating to Limerick, he was educated at Villiers Secondary School where he sat the Irish Leaving Certificate (he was inducted into the Villiers School Roll of Honour in 2012). After completing secondary school, he studied at Limerick School of Art and Design, Limerick; Mary Immaculate College of Education, Limerick; and the National College of Art & Design, Dublin.

=== Marriage and children ===
Walsh married Ursula Brick, a Senior Lecturer at the Limerick School of Art & Design in 1978 and they had three children. Ursula died after a short illness in 2023.

== Career ==
Ver XVIII (Fouquet) Acrylic/Oil/Canvas 50 × 50cm Samuel Walsh, 2014

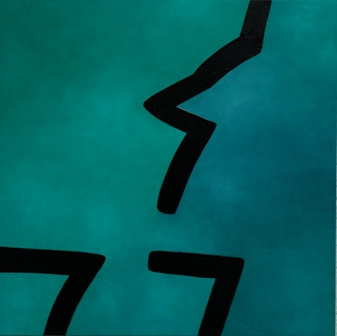
Testa I Acrylic/Oil/Wood 40.5 × 40.5 cm Samuel Walsh, 2006

Walsh is closely associated with the beginnings of the Exhibition of Visual Art (EVA/EV+A/eva international), Limerick, Limerick. In 1987 he founded the National Collection of Contemporary Drawing which hangs in the Limerick City Gallery of Art. Walsh is represented in Ireland by the Oliver Sears Gallery, Dublin where he held his first solo show (with that gallery) in 2014.

Walsh has exhibited his work in group exhibitions throughout Europe, the US and Asia. He has been selected for all open submission exhibitions in Ireland, particularly the Royal Hibernian Academy RHA, Dublin annually since 1982 and EVA International, Limerick in the 1980s/90s. He first showed at the 246th Royal Academy of Arts, London, in 2014.

Walsh's work has dealt with a variety of subject matter using an abstract visual language throughout his career: the Stations of The Cross ('Fourteen Points of Entry', 1991, now in the collection of the Irish Museum of Modern Art, Dublin); the encroachment of and into an individual's personal space ('Ambit' paintings, 2001–2002); his father's wartime experiences ('Airborne Drawings' 2002); interpretations of ancient classical art motifs ('Frieze' paintings and drawings 2006–2007). In November 2007 a major body of work by the artist based on 'The Divine Comedy' by Dante Alighieri opened at the Limerick City Gallery of Art. The 'Inferno' section travelled to CIAC, Pont-Aven, Brittany, France in May 2008 and was shown in its entirety again at Triskel@ESB: Caroline St., Cork in January 2010. He showed new paintings at VISUAL, Carlow in September 2011 entitled: 'The Coercion of Substance' that subsequently travelled to Drogheda, Co. Louth and Letterkenny, Co Donegal. He was included in 'From Edge to Edge: 100 Years of County Clare Art', in Glór, Ennis, Co Clare in 2016.

Walsh has been selected for international artist residencies in Switzerland in 1990, France in 1995 & 2002, the US in 2009, Berlin, Germany in 2012, 2015 & 2018 and Madrid in 2016. Following an artist's residency in Berlin in 2018, Walsh began making drawings, studies and paintings based on 'The Odyssey' by Homer. The paintings in particular follow his continued approach of combining line and form in equal value. He has said that in his early art school training, he was encouraged to 'give [his] lines character'. In these 'Odyssey' paintings, the lines represent characters, so introducing in linear form the many participants in this famous piece of literature, all of which are identified through different colours. He continued to create a number of works based on Ancient Greek themes and characters.

His work is in collections in Ireland including the National Gallery of Ireland, Irish Museum of Modern Art, Limerick City Gallery of Art, Crawford Gallery, Cork; the Arts Council/An Chomhairle Ealaíon; University College Dublin, University of Limerick, Trinity College, Dublin; Office of Public Works, Dublin; The National Self-Portrait Collection of Ireland, National Self-Portrait Collection, Limerick; University College, Cork; Leinster House, Dublin; County Collection, Ennis, County Clare; Dublin Dental School & Hospital, and in international collections in France, Croatia, Hungary, England & Switzerland.

=== Teaching ===
Walsh taught drawing at Limerick School of Art and Design from 1987 to 1997. He was the Professor of Drawing for the Autumn 2005 semester at the Pont-Aven School of Contemporary Art, Brittany, France. He has also been a visiting lecturer at this college, to the National College of Art & Design, Dublin and the Burren College of Art, County Clare. He lectured annually on the Drawing Studies course at the National Gallery of Ireland, Dublin, from 2008 to 2010.

=== Confusion with English Counterpart ===
Walsh is sometimes confused with the English artist of the same name who died in 1989. Despite the coincidence of Irish parentage, neither man ever met.

=== Exhibitions ===
==== Selected One-Man Exhibitions ====
Year	Exhibition	Location
2007	Frieze	RHA Ashford Gallery, Dublin
2007	The Divine Comedy	Limerick City Gallery of Art, Limerick
2013	The Seasons	The Drawing Project, Dun Laoghaire, Co Dublin
2014, 2017, 2022		The Oliver Sears Gallery, Dublin
2021	Segments	SO Fine Art Editions, Dublin
2021–2022	More Segments	Normoyle Frawley, Limerick
2022	The Odyssey	RHA Gallager Gallery, Dublin.
2023	The Odyssey and Segment Drawings	Ballinglen Gallery, Ballycastle, Co Mayo
2024	The Divine Comedy	Bourn Vincent Gallery, University of Limerick

== Published works ==
Walsh (and references to the importance of his work in Irish art) is included in the Royal Irish Academy/Yale University Press, 'Art and Architecture of Ireland, Volume V, 20th Century Art and Artists.

== Recognition ==
In 1997, Walsh was elected a member of Aosdána, a body administered through the Arts Council/An Chomhairle Ealaíon to recognise outstanding contributions by individuals to the creative arts in Ireland. He is a Fellow of the Ballinglen Arts Foundation, Ballycastle, County Mayo.

Walsh was awarded the Savills Art Prize at VUE Contemporary Art Fair, Royal Hibernian Academy (RHA) Gallagher Gallery, Dublin in 2017 for an artist over 65 who has had a major exhibition of their work in the previous year, and who has also made an outstanding contribution to the visual arts in Ireland.
