= Samuel P. Walsh =

American educator and politician

Samuel P. Walsh (January 30, 1902 – June 16, 1961) was an American educator and politician.

Born in the town of Oconto, Wisconsin, Walsh taught school. He served in the Wisconsin State Assembly as a Republican in 1925. His son was the sports announcer Blaine Walsh. Samuel Walsh died on June 16, 1961.
