= List of Bristol City F.C. players =

This is a list of notable footballers who have played for Bristol City. The aim is for this list to include all players that have played 100 or more senior matches for the club. Other players who are deemed to have played an important role for the club can be included, but the reason for their notability should be included in the 'Notes' column.

For a list of all Bristol City players with a Wikipedia article, see Category:Bristol City F.C. players, and for the current squad see Bristol City F.C.#Current squad.

== Explanation of List ==
Players should be listed in chronological order according to the year in which they first played for the club, and then by alphabetical order of their surname. Appearances and goals should include substitute appearances, but exclude wartime matches. Further information on competitions/seasons which are regarded as eligible for appearance stats are provided below, and if a player's data is not available for any of these competitions an appropriate note should be added to the table.

=== League appearances ===
League appearances and goals should include data for the following league spells, but should not include play-off matches:

- Southern League: 1897–98 to 1900–01
- Football League: 1901–02 to present

=== Total appearances ===
The figures for total appearances and goals should include the League figures together with the following competitions:

- Play-off matches (1987–88, 1996–97, 2002–03, 2003–04, 2007–08)
- FA Cup
- Football League Cup; Football League Trophy (1983–84 to 1989–90, 1995–96 to 1997–98, 1999–2000 to 2006–07); Full Members' Cup (1990–91, 1991–92); Anglo-Italian Cup (1992–93, 1993–94); Football League Third Division South Cup (1933–34 to 1938–39)
- Anglo-Scottish Cup (1975–76 to 1980–81), Football League Group Cup/Trophy (1982–83), Watney Cup (1973–74)

== List of players ==
Statistics are up to date as of 22 May 2012.

Name	Position	Club career	League apps	League goals	Total apps	Total goals	Notes
Jock Hamilton	LH	1897–1900	76	2	85	2	Manager of Bristol City 1915–1919
Billy Jones	RH	1897–1906	238	27	262	31	
Billy Wedlock	DF	1905–1921	362	17	391	17	
Peter Chambers	LH	1900–1906	160	10	176	10	
Harry Clay	G	1901–1913	310	0	332	0	
Billy Tuft	FB	1901–1906	137	0	150	0	
Herbert Banks	IL	1901–1903	42	17	44	20	England intl'
Dick Wombwell	OL	1902–1905	92	19	103	22	
Sam Gilligan	CF	1904–1910	188	78	211	87	
Arthur Spear	HB	1904–1911	136	1	151	1	
Harry Thickett	DF	1904–1905	14	0	18	0	Manager of Bristol City 1905—1910
Archie Annan	RB	1905–1910	143	0	161	0	
Andy Burton	IL	1905–1911	192	45	211	48	
Joe Cottle	LB	1905–1911	204	0	223	0	
Pat Hanlin	HB	1905–1911	162	3	168	3	
Frank Hilton	OL	1905–1910	116	21	125	22	
Billy Maxwell	IR	1905–1909	120	58	125	61	
Reuben Marr	RH	1906–1920	178	11	194	11	
Fred Staniforth	OR	1906–1911	134	14	149	15	
Bob Young	RB	1907–1920	168	0	172	0	
Edwin Jones	LB	1910–1923	107	4	109	4	
Laurie Banfield	LB	1911–1925	259	6	277	6	
John Nicholson	LH	1911–1921	197	4	207	4	
Tommy Broad	OR	1912–1915	106	8	111	8	
Jack Harris	OL	1912–1922	205	26	218	28	
Bert Neesam	RH	1913–1928	281	18	297	19	
Herbert Blake	G	1914-?	?	?	?	?	
Bill Pocock	OL	1919–1926	238	46	255	47	
Frank Vallis	G	1919–1926	219	0	236	0	
Jack Wren	RH	1919–1922	104	1	112	1	
Dick Hughes	LB	1920–1932	268	0	280	0	
Alex Torrance	LH	1921–1928	167	10	176	10	
Johnny Paul	IF	1922–1930	206	49	215	51	
Charlie Sutherland	IL	1922–1926	103	23	107	23	
Ernie Glenn	LB	1923–1931	276	0	288	0	
Andy Smailes	LH	1923–1929	162	14	169	15	
Tot Walsh	CF	1923–1928	142	88	150	91	
Billy Coggins	G	1925–1930	171	0	177	0	
Cyril Gilhespy	OR	1925–1929	117	25	118	25	
Albert Keating	IF	1925–1928, 1932–1933	100	53	104	54	
Jack Walsh	RB	1926–1932	164	1	167	1	
Jock Taylor	LB	1927–1934	148	0	159	0	
Bertie Williams	IF	1927–1932	103	26	109	29	
Allan Sliman	CH	1928–1932	136	2	141	2	
Ernie Brinton	LH	1929–1937	249	7	280	9	
Syd Homer	OR	1929–1934	179	18	194	19	
Wally Jennings	HB	1929–1934	122	1	130	1	
Cliff Morgan	RH	1930–1949	249	11	281	12	
Cyril Bridge	LB	1932–1939	155	0	178	0	
Leo Loftus	IL	1932–1935	93	29	106	34	
Bill Roberts	RB	1933–1937	135	7	173	7	
Jim Pearce	CH	1934–1939	148	2	170	2	
Dick Armstrong	IR LH	1935–1939	112	18	121	18	
Frank Peters	OR	1936–1939	113	22	123	22	
Don Clark	CF	1938–1952	117	67	128	77	
Dennis Roberts	CF	1938–1954	303	2	322	2	
Jack Bailey	LB	1946–1958	347	0	372	0	
Ivor Guy	RB	1946–1957	404	2	426	3	
Ernie Peacock	RH	1946–1959	343	7	356	9	
Cyril Williams	IL	1946–1948, 1951–1958	296	69	310	74	
Sid Williams	W	1946–1952	98	11	106	12	
Len Townsend	IR	1947–1949	74	45	80	50	
Alois Eisenträger	IF	1949–1959	233	57	246	57	
Arnold Rodgers	CF	1949–1956	195	106	204	111	
Pat Beasley	WH	1950–1952	66	5	73	5	Manager of Bristol City 1950–1958
Con Sullivan	GK	1950–53	73				
Jack Boxley	OL	1950–1957,1960–1961	205	34	213	35	from Stourbridge Oct 1950 £2,000
Jimmy Rogers	W	1950–1956,1958–1962	270	102	288	108	
John Atyeo	FW	1951–1966	596	314	645	351	Second most Bristol City appearances and record number of goals. Bristol City's Ateyo stand at Ashton Gate is named after him. He also has a statue of himself outside Bristol City's stadium.
Tony Cook	G	1952–1964	320	0	348	0	
Jack White	CH	1952–1958	216	11	227	11	
Johnny Watkins	OL	1953–1959	95	19	103	21	
Tommy Burden	WH	1954–1961	227	20	239	21	
Bob Anderson	G	1954–1959	106	0	109	0	
Mike Thresher	RB	1954–1965	379	1	415	1	
Wally Hinshelwood	OR	1955–1960	148	16	158	19	
Arthur Milton	W	1955	14	3	14	3	Double international at both cricket & football
Bobby Etheridge	RH	1956–1964	259	42	288	47	
Alan Williams	CH	1956–1961	134	2	140	2	
Alec Briggs	FB	1957–1970	351	0	395	1	
Gordon Parr	RH	1957–1972	287	4	326	4	
Tommy Casey	LH	1958–1963	122	9	133	9	
Jantzen Derrick	W	1959–1971	260	32	299	36	
Bobby "Shadow" Williams	IL	1958–1965	187	76	214	82	
Terry Bush	HB CF	1960–1970	162	43	182	45	
Brian Clark	IF	1960–1967	195	83	215	89	son of Don Clark
Jack Connor	CH	1960–1971	355	10	408	12	
Gordon Low	HB	1960–1968	205	12	226	14	
Roger "Lou" Peters	OL	1960–1968	158	25	177	27	
Alex Tait	CF	1960–1964	117	38	134	44	
Tony Ford	RB	1961–1970	171	10	186	12	
Mike Gibson	G	1962–1972	331	0	375	0	from Shrewsbury Town Apr 1963 £6,000
Danny Bartley	W	1964–1973	92+8	7	99+8	7	
Gerry Sharpe	IL	1964–1971	153	48	177	54	Youth coach of Bristol City Jul 1971
Chris Garland	FW	1966–1971, 1976–1982	207	42	247	53	One of "Ashton Gate Eight" in 1982
Trevor Jacobs	RB	1966–1973	131	3	146	3	
John Galley	CF	1967–1973	172	84	195	91	
Ken Wimshurst	RH	1967–1972	149	9	168	10	
Geoff Merrick	DF	1968–1982	367	10	434	13	One of "Ashton Gate Eight" in 1982
Trevor Tainton	MF	1965–1982	486	24	587	33	One of "Ashton Gate Eight" in 1982
Brian Drysdale	LB	1969–1977	282	3	328	4	
Gerry Gow	MF	1969–1980	375	48	445	55	
David Rodgers	DF	1969–1982	192	15	235	18	son of Arnold Rodgers. One of "Ashton Gate Eight" in 1982
Dickie Rooks	CH	1969–1972	96	4	110	5	
Ray Cashley	G	1970–1981	227	1	262	1	
Keith Fear	F	1970–1977	152	34	171	37	
John Emanuel	HB	1971–1976	128	10	140	10	
Gerry Sweeney	RB/MF	1971–1982	406	22	489	29	
Gary Collier	CH	1972–1979	193	3	230	3	
Donnie Gillies	CF, FB	1972–1980	201	26	244	30	
Tom Ritchie	FW	1969–1981, 1982–1984	414	102	502	132	
Clive Whitehead	MF	1973–1981	229	10	280	16	
Jimmy Mann	MF	1974–1982	231	31	282	46	One of "Ashton Gate Eight" in 1982
Norman Hunter	DF	1976–1979	108	4	122	5	
Peter Cormack	M	1976–1980	76	18	76	18	
John Shaw	G	1976–1985	295	0	357	0	
Kevin Mabbutt	F	1977–1982	129	29	168	47	
Joe Royle	FW	1977–1980	101	18	120	21	
Paul Stevens	RB	1977–1985	147	3	178	3	
Terry Cooper	LB	1978–1979,1982–1985	71	1	85	1	Manager of Bristol City 1982–1988
Howard Pritchard	W	1978–1981, 1983–1986	157	24	198	31	
Pertti Jantunen	M	1979–1980	8	1	8	1	26 caps for Finland (1 goal)
Geert Meyer	M	1979–1980	-	-	-	-	Born 1951 in Viagtwedde, Groningen Netherlands
Gary Williams	LB	1980–1984	99	1	118	1	son of Alan Williams
Rob Newman	DF	1981–1991	394	52	484	61	
Alan Crawford	W	1982–1985	92	26	108	28	
Andy Llewellyn	RB	1982–1994	308	3	373	3	
Glyn Riley	F	1982–1987	199	61	247	77	
Keith Curle	D	1983–1989	121	1	153	1	
Bobby Hutchinson	MF	1984–1987	92	10	118	13	
Steve Neville	F	1984–1988	134	40	163	49	
Alan Walsh	F	1984–1989	218	77	282	97	
David Moyes	DF	1985–1987	83	6	109	10	
Keith Waugh	GK	1985–1989	170	0	221	0	
Brian Williams	LB	1985–1987	77	3	102	3	
Steve Galliers	MF	1986–1989	77	6	98	6	
Glenn Humphries	D	1987–1991	85	0	104	0	
John Pender	CB	1987–1990	83	3	109	3	
Joe Jordan	CF	1987–1989	57	8	77	12	Manager of Bristol City 1988–1990, 1994–1997
Steve McClaren	MF	1987–1989	61	2	77	3	from Derby County Feb 1988 £50,000
Mark Gavin	MF	1988–1990,1991–1994	110	8	155	10	
Bob Taylor	CF	1988–1992	106	50	127	58	
Matt Bryant	DF	1989–1996	203	7	232	7	
David Rennie	MF	1989–1992	104	8	126	8	
Gary Shelton	MF	1989–1994	150	24	180	27	
Dave Smith	OL	1989–1992	97	10	116	14	
Bob Taylor	FW	1989–1992	106	50	126	58	
Mark Aizlewood	DF	1990–1993	101	3	118	3	
Wayne Allison	FW	1990–1995	195	48	225	57	
Junior Bent	WN	1990–1997	183	20	221	23	
Andy May	MF	1990–1992	90	4	101	6	
Martin Scott	LB	1990–1995	171	14	200	16	
Robert Edwards	DF	1991–1999	216	5	264	8	
Russell Osman	DF	1991–1994	70	3	80	3	Manager of Bristol City 1993–1994 from Southampton Oct 1991 £60,000
Keith Welch	GK	1991–1999	271	0	319	0	from Rochdale Aug 1991 £200,000
Stuart Munro	LB	1992–1996	94	0	117	1	
Andy Cole	FW	1992–1993	41	20	41	20	
Dariusz Dziekanowski	FW	1992–1993	43	7	43	7	62 Polish caps (20 goals)
Matt Hewlett	MF	1993–2000	112+16	9	133+21	12	
Mark Shail	DF	1993–2000	128	4	150	5	
Brian Tinnion	MF	1993–2005	458	36	549	42	Manager of Bristol City 2004–2005
Martin Kuhl	MF	1994–1997	94	7	113	9	
Gary Owers	MF	1994–1998	126	9	149	11	
Louis Carey	DF	1995–2004, 2005–	547	12	624	15	Record number of appearances for the club
Tommy Doherty	MF	1996–2005	188	7	225	9	
Gregory Goodridge	FW	1996–2001	119	14	148	17	
Shaun Taylor	CH	1996–2000	105	7	126	10	
Mickey Bell	LB	1997–2005	294	35	345	39	
Scott Murray	OR	1997–2003, 2004–2009	355	74	427	92	
Steve Phillips	GK	1997–2006	262	0	309	0	
Aaron Brown	MF	1998–2004	160	12	191	12	
Joe Burnell	MF	1998–2004	134	1	161	3	
Matt Hill	LB	1998–2005	203	6	246	6	
Tony Thorpe	FW	1998–2002	128	51	151	62	
Danny Coles	CH	1999–2005	153	6	180	8	
Lee Peacock	FW	2000–2004	148	54	175	63	
Christian Roberts	FW	2002–2004	99	21	118	26	
Leroy Lita	FW	2002–2005	85	31	100	38	
Luke Wilkshire	MF	2003–2006	110	17	124	18	
Steve Brooker	FW	2004–2009	101	37	110	39	
Bradley Orr	RB	2004–2010	229	12	255	13	
Cole Skuse	DM	2004–2013	254	9	281	9	
Adriano Basso	GK	2005–2010	165	0	182	0	
Richard Keogh	CB	2005–2008	40	3	53	5	
David Noble	CM	2005–2009	77	7	87	9	
Liam Fontaine	CB	2006–2014	262	6	294	7	
Lee Johnson	MF	2006–2012	174	11	199	11	Manager of Bristol City 2016 – Present
Jamie McAllister	LB	2006–2012	186	3	212	4	
Jamie McCombe	CB	2006–2010	119	9	132	11	
Michael McIndoe	LW	2007–2009	90	12	103	13	
Ivan Sproule	RW	2007–2011	117	6	128	7	
Marvin Elliott	MF	2007–2014	242	25	263	28	
Lee Trundle	FW	2007–2009	57	6	62	8	First £1million pound player
Nicky Maynard	FW	2008–2012	124	45	131	46	Record signing at the time for £2.25million
Paul Hartley	MF	2009–2010	40	5	42	5	
Jon Stead	FW	2010–2013	79	20	83	20	
Kalifa Cisse	MF	2010–2012	62	2	64	2	
Neil Kilkenny	MF	2011–2014	68	1	72	1	
Brett Pitman	FW	2010–2013	77	20	81	20	
Albert Adomah	FW	2010–2013	131	17	136	17	Ghanaian International Winger
David James	GK	2010–2012	81	0	84	0	Former England International Goalkeeper
Steven Caulker	CB	2010–2011	29	2	29	2	
Danny Rose	LM	2010–2011	17	0	17	0	England International Left-Back
Yannick Bolasie	LW	2011–2012	23	1	24	1	
Greg Cunningham	LB	2012–2015	91	4	107	5	
Tom Heaton	GK	2012–2013	43	0	44	0	England International
Sam Baldock	FW	2012–2014	78	34	84	36	
Jay Emmanuel-Thomas	FW	2013–2015	82	24	103	33	
Luke Ayling	CB	2014–2016	80	4	95	4	
Wade Elliott	MF	2014–2015	55	5	61	5	Double winning Captain
Nathan Baker	CB	2015–2016 2017-	127	2	127	2	
Jonathan Kodjia	FW	2015–2016	49	19	52	20	Record signing at the time for £3.25million
Luke Freeman	FW	2014–2017	105	10	121	10	
Aaron Wilbraham	FW	2014–2017	111	30	134	34	
Tammy Abraham	FW	2016–2017	41	23	41	23	England International Striker
Lee Tomlin	FW	2015–2017	58	12	60	13	
Bobby Reid	FW	2010–2018	135	26	158	29	Swapped Bristol City for fierce rivals Cardiff City, of the Premier League.
Aden Flint	CB	2013–2018	209	37	246	39	
Hörður Magnússon	CB	2016–2018	51	1	62	1	Iceland international, playing for CSKA Moscow of the Russian Premier League.
Joe Bryan	LB	2011–2018	203	16	230	20	
Marlon Pack	MF	2013–2019	244	11	282	12	
Adam Webster	CB	2018–2019	44	3	47	3	Sold to Brighton for a club record fee of £20million
Andreas Weimann	FW	2018-	136	40	142	40	
Sinclair Armstrong	FW	2024-	36	3	114	10	

== Notes ==
Philip Coggins joined Bristol City at the age of 16 from Dorset House Boys club he was signed as a pro at the age of 18 and played for the reserves and 1st team before leaving Bristol city at the age of 20.
