= John Atyeo =

English footballer (1932–1993)

Personal information
- Full name: Peter John Walter Atyeo
- Date of birth: 7 February 1932
- Place of birth: Dilton Marsh, England
- Date of death: 8 June 1993 (aged 61)
- Place of death: Warminster, England
- Position: Striker

Senior career*
Years	Team	Apps	(Gls)
1950–1951	Portsmouth	2	(0)
1951–1966	Bristol City	597	(314)
Total		599	(314)

International career
1955–1957	England	6	(5)
- * Club domestic league appearances and goals

Peter John Walter Atyeo (7 February 1932 – 8 June 1993) was an English footballer who played as a striker. He spent the majority of his career at Bristol City. He won six England caps between 1955 and 1957, scoring five goals. Atyeo made 645 appearances for Bristol City and scored a record 351 goals for them.

He played as an amateur for Portsmouth in 1950/51, then as a part-time professional for Bristol City while qualifying as a quantity surveyor until signing full-time ahead of the 1958/59 season. In 1963/64 he reverted to part-time status to prepare the way for his post-football career as a mathematics teacher.

== Biography ==
Atyeo was born at Clivey on the outskirts of Dilton Marsh, Wiltshire. He went to Berkley Primary School, near Frome, Somerset after his parents had moved the short distance over the county line to Standerwick when he was about six months old. He went on to Trowbridge Boys' High School (now The John of Gaunt School). As a schoolboy he played competitive football, rugby and cricket.

His first competitive games were for Westbury United, then Football League champions Portsmouth gave him two first team appearances in the 1950/51 season as an amateur, but he signed as a professional for Bristol City in the following season.

He enjoyed a fifteen-year career with Bristol City despite offers from Chelsea, Spurs, Liverpool and AC Milan which were worth around £20 million in today's money and could have made him the most expensive player in England. He made 645 appearances and became Bristol City's all-time top scorer with 351 goals by the time he retired in May 1966. He captained the team during their promotion-winning season in 1965.

He played semi-professionally for Bristol City (1951/52 to 57/58 seasons) while qualifying as a quantity surveyor, until signing full-time ahead of the 1958/59 season. Atyeo won six England caps from 1955 to 1957. There was conjecture that Atyeo's part-time status led to his being dropped by the England selectors despite his never having been on a losing side in his six international appearances, and scoring five goals including the goal that enabled England to qualify for the 1958 FIFA World Cup in Sweden. In 1963 he reverted to part-time status to prepare the way for his post-football career as a mathematics teacher.

Following his retirement from football, Atyeo became a full-time mathematics teacher at Kingdown School, Warminster, where he served for over 20 years, rising to head of mathematics, House Master of Arn House and Deputy Headmaster. He was regarded as a dedicated teacher. Atyeo also wrote a regular football column for the Plymouth-based Sunday Independent newspaper.

He died at home in Warminster of heart failure on 8 June 1993, survived by his wife Ruth and five children: Julie, Carol, Alison, Linda and Philip.

== Career ==
=== Portsmouth 1950–51 ===
As a teenage amateur, Atyeo played twice in the top flight for the then-League Champions Portsmouth. Both were home matches at Fratton Park and finished as draws: vs Charlton Athletic 3–3, 11/11/50 and vs Arsenal 1–1, 26/03/51.

=== Signing for Bristol City ===
It was due to the endeavours of the then Bristol City chairman, Harry Dolman, that Atyeo was signed by Bristol City rather than Portsmouth or other interested clubs. Dolman had a friend of his William Grant C.B.E. take the contract for the services of Atyeo down to Dilton Marsh, Wiltshire on 14 June 1951. He walked along the main railway line to the signal box where Atyeo's father worked and returned with a signed contract. The contract was unusual in having six specific clauses at the insistence of Atyeo's father. Atyeo should always be on top wages at Bristol City; he should always be allowed to live at home and continue his apprenticeship as a quantity surveyor; he should be allowed to drive to training on Tuesdays and Thursdays; City would donate £100 to Westbury United; City would play a friendly at Westbury United at the end of season 1952–1953 and Atyeo would not be put on the transfer list without the consent of his father.

=== Season 1951–52 ===
Atyeo joined Bristol City, a mid-table side in the Third Division South, in the summer of 1951. Atyeo made his Football League debut at centre forward in the opening game of the 1951–52 season in a 3–1 win v Newport County on 18 August 1951. Cyril Williams made his debut for City on his return from West Bromwich Albion in the same match. Both Atyeo and Williams were scorers in the win. The other goalscorer was Arnold Rodgers who had been the top scorer for Bristol City in the previous season with 20 goals in the no.9 shirt. Rodgers played inside left in 1951–52 as newcomer Atyeo took the centre forward role. Atyeo made 44 appearances scoring 12 goals in 1951–52 finishing joint top scorer with Arnold Rodgers who netted his 12 goals from 36 appearances. In the FA Cup Atyeo scored both goals on his FA Cup debut in the 1st round 2–1 win at Brighton & Hove Albion. This was the first time that Atyeo (2) appeared in the list of goalscorers, the second time was when Bristol City took a team to Westbury United on 24 April 1952 and won 2–0. On that occasion Atyeo was helped by scoring one goal from a penalty.

=== Season 1952–53 ===
Bristol City started the season poorly, Atyeo failed to score in the opening three matches at centre forward and moved to inside right for the remainder of his league appearances. Arnold Rodgers reverted to centre forward and scored four goals in the next four games and then followed this up with three successive doubles late in September. After the first 13 matches Bristol City lay in 10th place in the Third Division South and Atyeo had netted three goals. Atyeo then dropped out of the team until returning in the New Year on 3 January 1953 at Brighton & Hove Albion with the team on a 7 match unbeaten run and by this time in 3rd position in the table. The improvement was in part due to the signing by Pat Beasley of centre half Jack White for £5,300 from Aldershot. White was a dominant personality who was immediately installed as captain of the side. Atyeo netted his first league double in a 5–1 win v Walsall on 7 March 1953 and played in front of a crowd of 35,606 in February in the 0–0 draw with Bristol Rovers at Ashton Gate. Bristol City finished the season in 5th place but the disappointment was that they were five points behind local rivals Bristol Rovers who won promotion to the Second Division as Champions. Atyeo made 33 appearances and score 11 goals which proved to be the lowest for any season of his prolific goalscoring career. Rodgers was leading scorer with 26 goals, Cyril Williams netted 17 times and Alec Eisentrager scored 12 goals from the right wing. Atyeo enjoyed a post season friendly tour of Cornwall scoring twice at Penzance and four goals at Newquay in May 1953.

=== Season 1953–54 ===
Again Bristol City started the season badly and were 20th with four games played. Atyeo began the season at inside right with Arnold Rodgers at centre forward and Cyril Williams at inside left. Jack Boxley became the regular left winger while Alec Eisentrager, Jimmy Rogers and Ernie Jones tussled for the position of outside right. Andy Micklewright newly signed in May 1953 from Bristol Rovers quickly made his presence felt playing in several positions across the forward line and ending the season as 2nd top scorer with 16 goals. Atyeo missed only one league game, a 0–5 defeat at Swindon Town in October, as Bristol City made a steady rise up the table before Christmas to start the New Year in 8th place and finish in 3rd position a full eight points behind champions Ipswich Town. Atyeo made 45 appearances and was the leading scorer with 22 goals, his highest seasons tally to date, as Bristol City netted 88 goals during the season. Atyeo was most prolific in mid season scoring 17 goals in a 20 match spell between the end of September and 20 February 1954 when he netted his first hat-trick for the club in a 5–1 win v Swindon Town. Atyeo also scored a goal in each of the three rounds of the FA Cup as Bristol City eventually lost 1–3 v Rotherham United in front of 29,216 fans in the 3rd round. Atyeo also scored in a series of first team friendlies arranged throughout the season which saw the likes of Fenerbache, Chelsea, Hajduk Split and Arsenal visiting Ashton Gate. Although Atyeo was the leading scorer in 1953–54 it was Arnold Rodgers who had the best ratio for scoring with 14 goals in 23 appearances.

=== Champions of Third Division South ===
Bristol City hit the ground running in season 1954–55 reaching top spot in mid September and staying in one of the top two positions throughout the rest of the season. Jimmy Rogers took over as the regular right winger to partner Atyeo who played all season in the no.8 shirt. Arnold Rodgers played at centre forward in the first half of the season with Jimmy Rogers switching to centre forward for the second half. In the absence of Rogers, Eisentrager returned briefly before England international outside right Arthur Milton was signed by Pat Beasley for £4,000 from First Division Arsenal for a cameo 14 appearances in the promotion run in. Milton became the last double England international at both football and cricket in 1958 when he made his Test cricket debut. Milton gave up football in the summer of 1955 to concentrate on cricket with Gloucestershire as a consequence of which Arsenal refunded half of the transfer fee paid by Bristol City. Atyeo scored regularly throughout the season including doubles at Coventry City and Walsall along with doubles at Ashton Gate against Aldershot, Millwall, Bournemouth & Crystal Palace. Bristol City finished as champions of Third Division South nine points clear of runners up Leyton Orient. The 70 points (when it was 2 for a win and 1 for a draw) obtained by Bristol City equalled the record for the Third Division South set by Nottingham Forest four years earlier. Jack White and Atyeo were the only ever presents in the championship winning side of 1954–55. Atyeo made 46 appearances and was top scorer with 28 goals as City scored 101 league goals. Jimmy Rogers was next highest scorer with 25 goals and Arnold Rodgers again maintained a good goal ratio with 13 goals in 26 appearances. City continued to arrange first team friendlies entertaining Rheims and Linz at Ashton Gate and ending the season in May with a European tour including Hamborn 07, Linz and Stuttgart Kickers.

=== 30 goals in 1955–56 ===
In 1955–56 Bristol City returned to the Second Division for the first time since relegation when finishing bottom in season 1931–32. There were no new names in the Bristol City team that took the field in the opening game a 2–1 win v Swansea Town on 20 August 1955 which was the Second Division debut for Atyeo. Two days later Atyeo scored the first of many goals in the Second Division in a 3–1 win at Rotherham United. Atyeo played at inside right throughout the season with Eisentrager as his regular right wing partner until Pat Beasley signed Wally Hinshelwood for £15,000 from Reading in February 1956. Jimmy Rogers had his most productive goalscoring season with 25 goals from centre forward. Tommy Burden provided the skill and drive at inside left and Jack Boxley was on the left wing completing the regular forward line. Atyeo missed only 3 league games, all of which were defeats, two against Leeds United. Atyeo had a productive first half of the season scoring 20 goals in his first 19 games as the "Robins" stormed to the top of the table in mid November and remained at the summit until Christmas Eve. Atyeo scored a hat-trick (including a penalty) in a 3–1 win v Bury on 17 September and another hat-trick in a 5–1 win v Lincoln City on 3 December. City only won seven more league games after the win over Lincoln City and finished in 11th position in the final Second Division table as Atyeo scored only 10 more goals in the remaining 20 matches, still a good goals per game ratio. Overall Atyeo made 39 appearances and scored 30 goals in the league recording the highest total of league goals in a season in his career. This is the closest Atyeo came to the Bristol City record for goals in a season held by Don Clark with 36 goals in 1946–47. In the FA Cup a crowd of 46,493 saw City defeated 1–3 in the 3rd round at Everton. However the 46,713 who witnessed the 1–2 league defeat at Liverpool became the largest crowd to watch Atyeo in Bristol City colours, that is, until the following season. Frankfurt, Nice and Stuttgart Kickers were the European teams welcomed to Ashton Gate for first team friendlies with Atyeo a regular scorer in the friendlies.

=== England 1955–1957 ===
Atyeo made his England debut at inside right in a 4–1 friendly win over Spain at Wembley on 30 November 1955 in a forward line of Tom Finney (PNE); Atyeo; Nat Lofthouse (Bolton W); Johnny Haynes (Fulham) and Perry (Blackpool). Atyeo, Perry (2) & Finney scored.

Atyeo won his 2nd England cap at inside right in a 4–2 friendly win over Brazil at Wembley on 9 May 1956 in a forward line of Stanley Matthews (Blackpool); Atyeo; Tommy Taylor (Man Utd); Haynes (Fulham) and Grainger (Sheff Utd). Taylor (2) & Grainger (2) scored. Atyeo took and missed a penalty in this match.

Atyeo won his 3rd England cap at inside right in a 0–0 friendly draw with Sweden in Stockholm on 16 May 1956 in a forward line of Berry (Man Utd); Atyeo; Taylor (Man Utd); Haynes (Fulham) and Finney (Preston).

Atyeo won his 4th England cap at inside right in a 5–1 World Cup win over Republic of Ireland at Wembley on 8 May 1957 in a forward line of Matthews (Blackpool); Atyeo; Taylor (Man Utd); Haynes (Fulham) and Finney (Preston). Taylor (3) & Atyeo (2) scored.

Atyeo won his 5th England cap at inside right in a 4–1 World Cup win over Denmark in Copenhagen on 15 May 1957 in a forward line of Matthews (Blackpool); Atyeo; Taylor (Man Utd); Haynes (Fulham) and Finney (Preston). Haynes, Taylor (2) & Atyeo scored.

Atyeo won his 6th and final England cap at inside right in a 1–1 World Cup draw with Republic of Ireland in Dublin on 19 May 1957 in a forward line of Finney (Preston); Atyeo; Taylor (Man Utd); Haynes (Fulham) and David Pegg (Man Utd). Atyeo scored the goal.

Overall Atyeo won 6 England caps scoring 5 goals and played alongside experienced England internationals like Tom Finney 76 caps (1946–1958), Stanley Matthews 54 caps (1934–1957), Johnny Haynes 56 caps (1954–1962), Nat Lofthouse 33 caps (1950–1958) and Tommy Taylor 19 caps (1953–1957). Bill Perry 3 caps, Colin Grainger 7 caps, Johnny Berry 4 caps and David Pegg a single cap made fewer appearances but it must be remembered that there were far fewer internationals played in the 1950s than nowadays.

=== Season 1956–57 ===
Bristol City struggled throughout 1956–57 hovering above the relegation places for much of the season before settling into mid table with a run of 8 league victories in 9 matches between mid February and mid April 1957. Atyeo started the season with five goals in the opening 4 matches playing mainly at inside right alongside Hinshelwood on the right wing. However, in mid November manager Pat Beasley sold both centre forward Jimmy Rogers and left winger Jack Boxley to Coventry City. This prompted the signing of Irish centre forward Dermot Curtis from Shelborne for £5,000 in December 1956. Atyeo moved between inside right and centre forward depending on whether Curtis was playing in the team. Further forward line changes took place at much the same time as Bobby Etheridge signed from Gloucester City and young Johnny Watkins teamed up to form a new left sided partnership for Bristol City. As a result, only Hinshelwood with 41 appearances and Atyeo with 37 appearances were regulars throughout the season. Atyeo was the leading scorer again with 23 goals and Curtis the only other to reach double figures with 13 goals in only 16 games. Atyeo scored a league hat-trick in a 5–1 win v Sheffield United in January. Atyeo also created Bristol City history on 16 March 1957 scoring after only nine seconds of the match v Bury which City went on to win 2–0 with Atyeo scoring both goals. This still remains as the fastest ever goal scored in a match by a Bristol City player. In the FA Cup Atyeo scored doubles in both the 3rd & 4th round ties v Rotherham United and Rhyl. Atyeo also scored the goal in a 1–2 defeat at Aston Villa in the 5th round before a crowd of 63,099.

=== Season 1957–58 ===
Bristol City spent another season in 1957–58 struggling to avoid dropping into the relegation places. A poor run in mid season of only a single win in 14 matches between mid November and the start of March 1958 prompted a change of manager with Pat Beasley sacked on 6 January. There followed a three-week spell of caretaker management until Harry Dolman secured Peter Doherty as the new manager from Doncaster Rovers whom Dolman had first sought some nine years earlier. Doherty was quick to sign inside right Bert Tindill from Doncaster Rovers for £6,400 on 3 February and seven wins in the last 12 games lifted the "Robins" to safety and a 17th-place finish in the Second Division. The forward line had a distinctly more stable look in 1957–58 with wingers Hinshelwood and Watkins, Atyeo at centre forward and Etheridge at inside left. Tommy Burden, Curtis, Eisentrager and latterly Tindill also all featured in short spells across the forward line. Atyeo was the only ever present player with 42 appearances and ended as leading scorer with 23 goals including a hat-trick in a 3–0 win at Sheffield United. Tindill scored ten goals in only 14 appearances including successive hat-tricks in April wins v Barnsley and at Fulham. In the FA Cup the 5th round tie v Bristol Rovers at Ashton Gate drew a crowd of 39,160 but resulted in a 3–4 defeat to the local rivals. Atyeo scored twice in a mid season friendly 4–3 win over Tottenham Hotspur.

=== Season 1958–59 ===
Following a season of management change there was incredible stability within the team in 1958–59. Nine of the team appeared in 37 or more league matches with a line up of Cook; Hopkinson, Thresher; McCall, Williams, Burden; Hinshelwood, Tindill, Atyeo, Etheridge and Watkins. Bristol City opened with 6–1 and 7–4 wins but then lost 0–4 at Sheffield United. Atyeo scored a hat-trick in the 7–4 win at Barnsley on 27 August 1958 and added a second hat-trick in the 4–0 win v Swansea Town on 11 October 1958. This had City fans dreaming of a return to the First Division as the "Robins" remained in contention for promotion through to January when 6th in the table before falling away to a final 10th-place finish. Atyeo was top goalscorer again with 26 goals in 40 appearances leading the line as centre forward. Tindill scored 19 goals and Etheridge 13 goals as the inside forwards. In the FA Cup City lost 0–1 in a 4th round replay at Blackpool. The 1–1 home draw had attracted 42,594 fans to see an ageing Stanley Matthews confronted by the City left back Mike Thresher.

=== Relegation in 1959–60 ===
Bristol City started 1959–60 poorly despite the club record fee signing of left wing pairing Malcolm Graham and Johnny McCann from Barnsley for a combined £20,000 with Bert Tindill leaving in the opposite direction. Other additions of left half Tommy Casey from Newcastle United and inside forward Tommy Cavanagh from Doncaster Rovers together with the return of Jimmy Rogers from Coventry City all gave City fans hope of a good season but by mid September the side were bottom of the table and between 21 November 1959 and the end of the season the "Robins" never rose above the two relegation places eventually being relegated as 22nd and bottom of the table. The season was beset by injury with McCann breaking his leg in Boxing Day match and Graham scoring 8 goals from only 14 appearances through persistent knee injuries. Atyeo finished a disappointing season as one of only two ever presents in the team, the other being the goalkeeper Tony Cook. Atyeo was also joint top scorer for Bristol City with 16 goals from his 42 appearances. Rogers also scored 16 goals from only 31 appearances on his return to Ashton Gate. Manager Peter Doherty was dismissed on 15 March and relegation confirmed by defeat at Leyton Orient on 23 April. The new manager Fred Ford was not appointed until July 1960.

=== Season 1960–61 ===
The Football League parallel Third Divisions South & North had been reformed into a Third and Fourth Division so City played their first ever season of Third Division football under new manager Fred Ford. Bristol City spent most of the season 1960–61 in mid table. Atyeo missed a few early games but by October the forward line took on a fairly consistent look. Jimmy Rogers on the right wing partnered Atyeo at inside right. While Bristol youngsters Bobby Williams & Jantzen Derrick formed the left flank. New signing Alex Tait costing £5,000 from Newcastle United was the centre forward. Atyeo made 37 appearances scoring 19 goals including a hat-trick in the final game of the season in a 3–0 win v Brentford. This made Atyeo leading goalscorer once again with Tait scoring 15 goals. In the FA Cup Chichester City forfeited home advantage in the 1st round on 5 November 1960 and Bristol City scored a record highest ever FA Cup win by 11–0 with Atyeo scoring five goals. In the inaugural season of the League Cup Atyeo played in all three ties scoring twice in the 2nd round replay v Aldershot and in the 1–2 3rd round defeat at Nottingham Forest.

=== Season 1961–62 ===
Bristol City rose steadily up the table from a slow start and hovered in 2nd or 3rd place in the table throughout February & March 1962 before finishing in 6th position. Two local Bristol boys Brian Clark and Roger "Lou" Peters who had both made their debuts in the final game v Brentford in 1961–62 were given increased chances at inside right and outside left respectively. Overall the forward line was consistent with the previous season. Jimmy Rogers scored only four goals in his final season with the "Robins" on the right wing. Alex Tait scored 13 goals from centre forward while "Shadow" Wiliams netted 21 goals from inside left. Jantzen Derrick also scored four goals from the left wing. Atyeo was again top scorer with 26 goals from 42 appearances including hat-tricks in a 3–0 win v Grimsby Town in October and in a 4–0 win at Swindon Town in March. Atyeo also scored four goals in a 6–0 win v Notts County on 16 December 1961.

=== Season 1962–63: Snow on Boxing Day ===
Heavy snow fell on Boxing Day 1962 and stayed on the ground until a major thaw at the beginning of March 1963. During January Bristol City played only a single FA Cup 3rd round tie with the replay taking place on 7 March 1963 when City lost 2–3 at Aston Villa. Bristol City played only home games between the away defeats in league matches at Millwall on 15 December and at Swindon Town on 2 March. The backlog in fixtures led to Bristol City playing 8 matches in April and 4 in May a total of 12 games in 43 days at the end of the season. Atyeo only played in three of these backlog fixtures with Tait switching from right wing to centre forward. Bristol City scored 100 league goals but conceded 92 during the season. The "Robins" kept only three clean sheets, all in September, and failed to score in only four matches. Atyeo moved to centre forward for most of his 30 appearances scoring 16 goals and finishing behind both "Shadow" Williams and top scorer Brian Clark in the goal scoring charts. In a season of goals all five of the regular forward line reached double figures for goals. Both wingers Alex Tait and Jantzen Derrick scored ten goals, while inside forwards Clark netted 23 times and Williams scored 19 goals. Even Barrie Meyer the Gloucestershire cricketer scored seven goals in 6 games when deputising for Atyeo. Bristol City spent the whole season in mid table finishing in 14th position but second top scorers in the Third Division.

=== Season 1963–64 ===
Bristol City started the season in mid table and slowly improved to finish in 5th position just five points short of promotion. The team remained remarkably consistent throughout the season with nine players appearing in 38 or more matches together with Derrick 33 and Low 32. The familiar line up was Gibson; Briggs, Thresher; Parr, Connor, Low; Derrick, Clark, Atyeo, "Shadow" Williams and Hooper. Peter Hooper the left winger with the explosive shot was the only new recruit in the summer costing £11,000 from Cardiff City. Atyeo was ever present with 46 appearances scoring 21 goals. Atyeo also played in the Boxing Day fixture which was abandoned at half time v QPR with City winning 3–0. Atyeo was the leading City goal scorer for the season ahead of inside forwards Clark, the only other ever present, with 19 goals and Williams 20 goals. Atyeo scored 12 goals in the first 21 games but then failed to score in a spell of 7 matches before hitting a hat-trick in a 5–1 win v Walsall on 8 February 1964. Atyeo also netted four FA Cup goals as Bristol City reached the 4th round before they lost 1–6 at Sunderland.

=== Season 1964–65: Promoted from Third Division ===
After an initial 2–5 defeat at Scunthorpe United Bristol City embarked on a remarkable run of six matches winning 5–1, 5–1, 4–0, 5–0, 4–0 with a 2–2 draw at Watford sandwiched in between. This left City at the top of the Third Division table and Brian Clark had scored 11 goals in 7 matches while Atyeo had scored two hat-tricks in only five games in a 5–1 win v Walsall on 29 August 1964 and a 4–0 win v Southend United on 8 September. After this Bristol City remained near the top but never again reached the top two promotion positions until the final two games of the season. The final run in of 12 wins in the last 15 matches clinching promotion on goal average on the final day with a 2–0 win v Oldham Athletic in front of a crowd of 28,248 on 24 April 1965. Atyeo scored six goals in the final three games including 4 goals in a 5–1 win at Shrewsbury Town on 19 April 1965. Brian Clark ended the season as ever present and top scorer with 24 goals. Atyeo scored 23 goals but made fewer appearances playing in only 38 matches. Atyeo began the season at centre forward flanked by inside forwards Clark and "Shadow" Williams. Williams was replaced for a spell in mid season by young Gerry Sharpe and then Williams was sold for £11,000 to Rotherham United. This led to a switch with Atyeo reverting to inside right, Clark moving to inside left and utility player Terry Bush stepping up from half back to centre forward to good effect scoring eight times in the run in to promotion. Atyeo was captain of this promotion winning team.

=== Season 1965–66: Retirement ===
Back in the Second Division Bristol City conceded only 48 goals, the third best defensive record in the division, and lost only eight matches; only champions Manchester City lost fewer. Bristol City remained in the promotion race throughout the season but only broke into the top two promotion positions briefly for one weekend in September. Over the Easter period a 0–1 defeat v Southampton at Ashton Gate effectively ended the promotion push and the "Robins" finished three points behind runners up Southampton in 5th place in the final table which was the highest finishing position that the "Robins" achieved in the playing career of Atyeo. Atyeo made 35 appearances and ended his career as top scorer on 19 goals with Clark scoring 15 goals despite playing in more games. Atyeo scored doubles in away games at Portsmouth where City won 4–2 in November, at Coventry City in 2–2 draw and in the following match a 2–4 defeat at Middlesbrough. In his final game in Bristol City colours on 10 May 1966 v Ipswich Town, Atyeo scored a further two goals in a 4–1 win in front of a rather meagre 13,893 crowd.

Atyeo was joint top scorer in his debut season 1951–52 and top scorer in his final season 1965–66. In all Atyeo was top scorer in ten seasons, joint top scorer in another two and beaten only in three seasons by Arnold Rodgers in 1952–53 and by Brian Clark in both 1962–63 and 1964–65. Atyeo never failed to reach double figures for league goals scored in his 15-season career at Ashton Gate. Atyeo was also ever present in four seasons 1954–55, 1957–58, 1959–60 and 1963–64 which included the promotion campaign of 1954–55. During the promotion season of 1964-65 Atyeo was not selected for the away match at Gillingham on 6 February. This was the only time in his Bristol City career that he was fit and able to play but not selected. The Gillingham game was the sixth in a run which realised two draws and four defeats. Not picking Atyeo had the desired effect with Bristol City winning their next seven consecutive games (including victory against arch-rivals Bristol Rovers) and in fact, they won twelve and drew two of their last fifteen games to clinch promotion.

== Career statistics ==
Appearances and goals by national team and year
National team	Year	Apps	Goals
England	1955	1	1
England	1956	2	0
England	1957	3	4
Total		6	5

Scores and results list England's goal tally first, score column indicates score after each Atyeo goal.

List of international goals scored by John Atyeo
No.	Date	Venue	Opponent	Score	Result	Competition	Ref.
1	30 November 1955	Wembley Stadium, London, England	Spain	1–0	4–1	Friendly	
2	8 May 1957	Wembley Stadium, London, England	Republic of Ireland	3–0	5–1	1958 FIFA World Cup qualification	
3	8 May 1957	Wembley Stadium, London, England	Republic of Ireland	5–1	5–1	1958 FIFA World Cup qualification	
4	15 May 1957	Idrætspark, Copenhagen, Denmark	Denmark	3–1	4–1	1958 FIFA World Cup qualification	
5	19 May 1957	Dalymount Park, Dublin, Republic of Ireland	Republic of Ireland	1–1	1–1	1958 FIFA World Cup qualification	

== Honours ==
Bristol City

- Football League Third Division South: 1954–55
- Football League Third Division runner-up: 1964–65

== Memorials ==
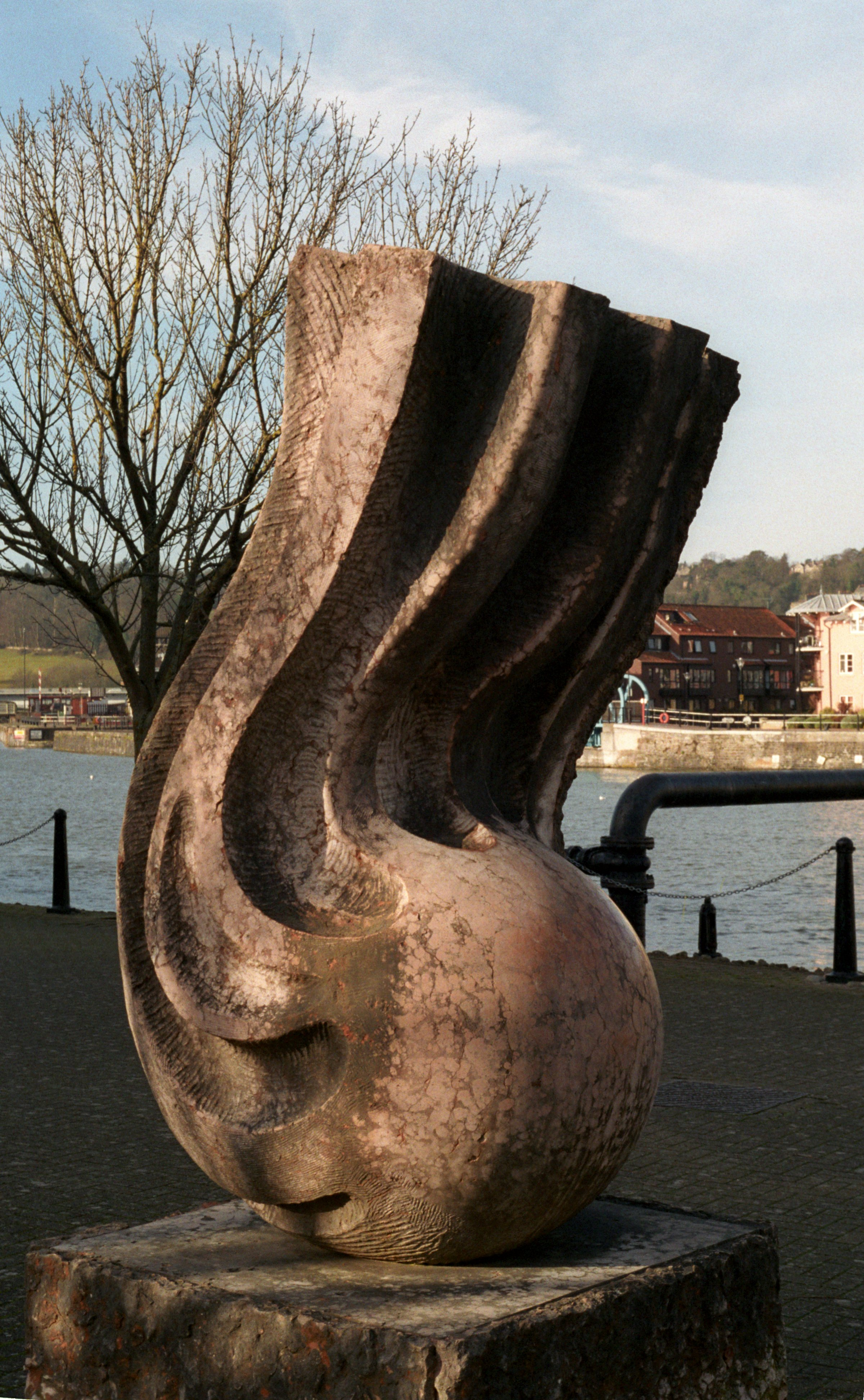
Atyeo (1986) on the waterfront in Bristol, by Stephen Cox whose boyhood hero was John Atyeo

Atyeo Close, Dilton Marsh is built on the site of "Glenthorne", the house his family moved to in the late 1930s. Atyeo Place, Warminster, BA12 9BL is built on the grounds of 2 The Avenue, his last place of residence. The new stand that replaced the Park End at Ashton Gate in 1994 is named the Atyeo Stand after him. Bristol City Supporters Trust commissioned the statue of Atyeo that now has pride of place outside Bristol City's revamped stadium.
