= Severnside derby =

Bristol-Cardiff football rivalry

- Location: South Wales and West Country (England)
- Teams: Bristol City; Cardiff City
- First meeting: Bristol City 2–0 Cardiff City; FA Cup (9 January 1915)
- Latest meeting: Cardiff City 1–1 Bristol City; EFL Championship (15 February 2025)
- Next meeting: Bristol City v Cardiff City; EFL Championship (19 December 2026)
- Stadiums: Ashton Gate Stadium (Bristol City); Cardiff City Stadium (Cardiff City)

Statistics
- Total meetings: 104
- Most wins: Bristol City (42 wins)
- Most player appearances: Louis Carey (Bristol City) (36)
- Largest victory: Bristol City 0–6 Cardiff City (26 January 2010)

The Severnside derby is a local derby in football in the United Kingdom between Welsh club Cardiff City and either of the English clubs, Bristol City or Bristol Rovers. Alternatively, it may be between Newport County and either of the Bristol-based clubs.

== Reasons for the rivalry ==
Although these matches are traditional rivalries between teams which are geographically fairly close, they are different in that they also cross the Wales–England border, increasing somewhat the hostility between the two teams. As well as bragging rights, the matches are seen as an "international contest". Both sets of fans use this to taunt each other with patriotic songs.

In the Football Fans census in 2003 about football rivalries, Bristol City and Cardiff were listed as 10th and 13th in the UK respectively in a list of teams.

== Violence ==
The fans of both Cardiff and Bristol City have a history of hooliganism and have their own hooligan firm: Cardiff's being the Soul Crew and Bristol City with the City Service Firm. Due to the fierce rivalry and the history of the two teams the encounters can end up with some sort of conflict, commonly pre-organised.

In an attempt to discourage the violence, games between the two are usually kept "all coach", meaning that everyone travelling to an away game must travel using the club's official transport and therefore no one can travel to the game of their own accord. The coaches are usually accompanied by a heavy police presence and away fans tend to be kept in the ground after the game until the home fans have all left. While this has been mildly successful in stopping organised fights, fans still attempt to attack each other by throwing objects such as bottles and coins during the game.

The violence involved with this derby was featured in a BBC documentary in 2001, Hooligans. In the programme a reporter wearing a hidden camera infiltrated the Soul Crew, exposing the use of racist chanting and abuse as well as a lack of control by stewards and police.

== Notable characters in past encounters ==
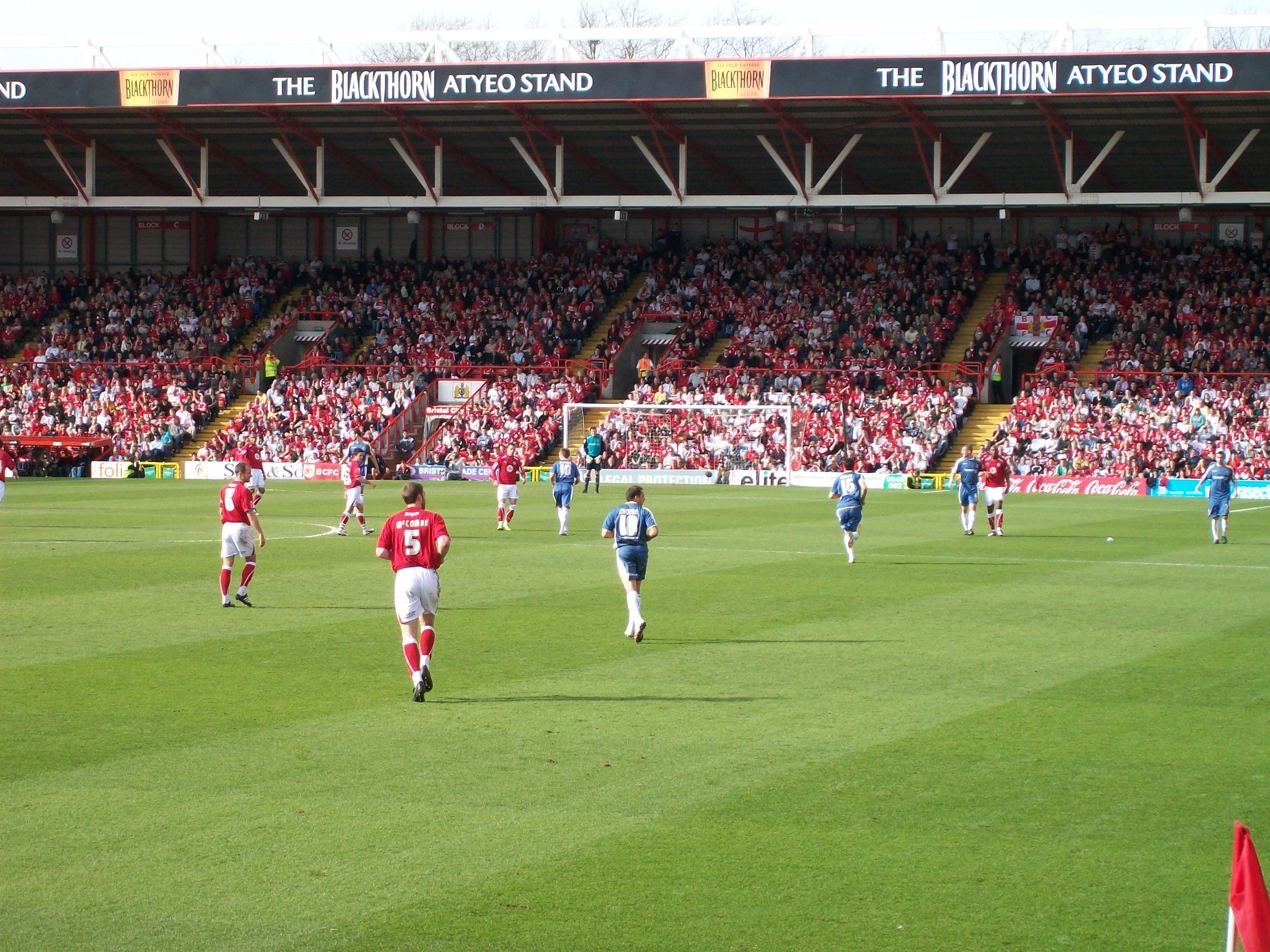
Bristol City and Cardiff City meet at Ashton Gate in March 2009

Unlike the South Wales derby, and the Bristol derby, it is not usually frowned upon to sign a player or manager who has played for the opposition in the Severnside Derby. The only players that are disfavoured are players who are remembered for one-off incidents.

Such players include former Bristol City player Lee Trundle, who is hated by Cardiff fans for a long affiliation with rivals Swansea City. After winning the LDV Vans Trophy in 2006, Trundle took to the pitch wearing a T-shirt depicting a Swansea fan urinating on a Cardiff City shirt. He also held up a Flag of Wales with the words "Fuck off Cardiff" on it but claimed he did not realise it was written on there.

== Head-to-head record ==
Chart of yearly table positions of the derby participants in the league.

Results summary
From 104 competitive games:

Bristol City 42 Wins
Cardiff City 39 Wins
23 Draws

Last Result

Cardiff City	1	1	Bristol City

Saturday 15 February 2025
Football League Championship,
Cardiff City Stadium, Cardiff
Attendance: 22,433

Competition	Played	Bristol City	Draw	Cardiff City
League	94	38	21	35
FA Cup	7	2	2	3
League Cup	3	2	0	1
Totals	104	42	23	39

Current as of 15 February 2025 Statistics obtained from Soccerbase.

== Game list ==
Bristol City win Cardiff City win Draw

Date	Competition	Stadium	Score	Bristol City scorers	Cardiff City scorers	Attendance	Ref.
15 February 2025	Championship	Cardiff City Stadium	1–1	Jason Knight 60'	Yousef Salech 90'	22,433	
6 October 2024	Championship	Ashton Gate Stadium	1–1	Luke McNally 73'	Ollie Tanner 54'	22,664	
2 March 2024	Championship	Ashton Gate Stadium	1–0		Perry Ng 66'	24,035	
28 October 2023	Championship	Cardiff City Stadium	2-0		Perry Ng 33' Rubin Colwill 90+1'	25,806	
4 March 2023	Championship	Cardiff City Stadium	2–0		Sory Kaba 52'; Jaden Philogene 70'	22,156	
21 August 2022	Championship	Ashton Gate Stadium	2–0	Tommy Conway 41'; Robert Atkinson 64'		21,649	
22 January 2022	Championship	Ashton Gate Stadium	3–2	Chris Martin 33', 63'; Andreas Weimann 77'	James Collins 31'; Max Watters 90'	21,435	
28 August 2021	Championship	Cardiff City Stadium	2–1	Andreas Weimann 21', 70'	Dan Bentley 51' (o.g.)	20,891	
6 February 2021	Championship	Ashton Gate Stadium	2–0		Curtis Nelson 18'; Kieffer Moore 25'	0	
6 November 2020	Championship	Cardiff City Stadium	1–0	Chris Martin 2'		0	
4 July 2020	Championship	Ashton Gate Stadium	1–0		Danny Ward 85'	0	
10 Nov 2019	Championship	Cardiff City Stadium	1–0	Josh Brownhill 67'		23,846	
Cardiff City were relegated to Championship 2018–19
Cardiff City were promoted to Premier League 2017–18
25 Feb 2018	Championship	Cardiff City Stadium	1–0		Kenneth Zohore 82'	21,018	
4 Nov 2017	Championship	Ashton Gate Stadium	2–1	Callum O'Dowda 20'; Aden Flint 66'	Omar Bogle 55'	21,692	
14 Jan 2017	Championship	Ashton Gate Stadium	3–2	Brian Murphy 51' (o.g.); Tammy Abraham 78'	Anthony Pilkington 74' (pen.), 85'; Kadeem Harris 82'	19,452	
14 Oct 2016	Championship	Cardiff City Stadium	2–1	Lee Tomlin 69'	Peter Whittingham 25' (pen.); Sol Bamba 67'	22,776	
5 Mar 2016	Championship	Ashton Gate Stadium	2–0		Lex Immers 21'; Stuart O'Keefe 83'	15,758	
26 October 2015	Championship	Cardiff City Stadium	0–0			15,287	
Bristol City were promoted to Championship 2014–15
Cardiff City were relegated to Championship 2013–14
Bristol City were relegated to League One 2012–13; Cardiff City were promoted to Premier League 2012–13
16 Feb 2013	Championship	Cardiff City Stadium	2–1	Ben Nugent 90' (o.g.)	Fraizer Campbell 45', 58'	25,586	
25 Aug 2012	Championship	Ashton Gate Stadium	4–2	Stephen Pearson 32'; Martyn Woolford 45', 70'; Sam Baldock 87'	Joe Mason 57'; Heidar Helguson 82'	14,368	
10 Mar 2012	Championship	Ashton Gate Stadium	2–1	Jon Stead 52'	Stephen McManus 45' (o.g.); Kalifa Cissé 87' (o.g.)	12,495	
14 Aug 2011	Championship	Cardiff City Stadium	3–1	Nicky Maynard 82'	Mark Hudson 18'; Craig Conway 23'; Robert Earnshaw 36'	22,639	
1 Jan 2011	Championship	Ashton Gate Stadium	3–0	Brett Pitman 3'; Lee Johnson 39'; Jamal Campbell-Ryce 55'		15,638	
16 Oct 2010	Championship	Cardiff City Stadium	3–2	Steven Caulker 6'; Jon Stead 8'	Jay Bothroyd 12'; Peter Whittingham 46', 78'	22,444	
26 Jan 2010	Championship	Ashton Gate Stadium	6–0		Peter Whittingham 19'; Ross McCormack 23', 57'; Michael Chopra 24', 46'; Liam Fontaine 43' (o.g.)	13,825	
19 Jan 2010	FA Cup	Cardiff City Stadium	1–0		Bradley Orr 74' (o.g.)	6,731	
12 Jan 2010	FA Cup	Ashton Gate Stadium	1–1	Gavin Williams 90'	Michael Chopra 76'	7,289	
23 Aug 2009	Championship	Cardiff City Stadium	3–0		Jamie McCombe 37' (o.g.); Michael Chopra 45'; Gavin Rae 66'	20,853	
15 Mar 2009	Championship	Ashton Gate Stadium	1–1	Nicky Maynard 71'	Ross McCormack 88'	17,487	
13 Sep 2008	Championship	Ninian Park	0–0			19,312	
22 Mar 2008	Championship	Ninian Park	2–1	Dele Adebola 73'	Roger Johnson 44'; Peter Whittingham 81'	16,458	
15 Dec 2007	Championship	Ashton Gate Stadium	1–0	Marvin Elliott 57'		15,753	
Bristol City were promoted to Championship 2006–07
Cardiff City were promoted to First Division 2002–03
13 May 2003	Second Division play-offs	Ashton Gate Stadium	0–0			16,307	
10 May 2003	Second Division play-offs	Ninian Park	1–0		Peter Thorne 74'	19,146	
22 Apr 2003	Second Division	Ashton Gate Stadium	2–0	Brian Tinnion 55' (pen.); Christian Roberts 73'		15,615	
14 Dec 2002	Second Division	Ninian Park	2–0	Brian Tinnion 49'; Christian Roberts 76'		15,239	
29 Dec 2001	Second Division	Ninian Park	3–1	Scott Murray 56', 58'; Lee Matthews 60'	Graham Kavanagh 47'	16,149	
9 Oct 2001	Second Division	Ashton Gate Stadium	1–1	Mickey Bell 56'	Robert Earnshaw 45' (pen.)	13,804	
Cardiff City are promoted to Second Division 2000–01
Cardiff City are relegated to Third Division 1999–2000
22 Feb 2000	Second Division	Ninian Park	0–0			6,586	
9 Jan 2000	Second Division	Ashton Gate Stadium	0–0			10,570	
Bristol City are relegated to Second Division 1998–99; Cardiff City are promoted to Second Division 1998–99
Bristol City are promoted to First Division 1997–98
Bristol City are relegated to Second Division 1994–95; Cardiff City are relegated to Third Division 1994–95
Cardiff City are promoted to Second Division 1992–93
25 Aug 1992	League Cup	Ashton Gate Stadium	5–1	Andy Cole 9', 14', 90'; Leroy Rosenior 24'; Wayne Allison 65'	Carl Dale 54'	9,801	
18 Aug 1992	League Cup	Ninian Park	1–0		Carl Dale 2'	4,066	
Cardiff City are relegated to Fourth Division 1989–90
10 Feb 1990	Third Division	Ashton Gate Stadium	1–0	Gary Shelton 3'		11,982	
16 Sep 1989	Third Division	Ninian Park	3–0	Gary Shelton 45'; Bob Taylor 54'; Robbie Turner 62'		5,970	
1 Apr 1989	Third Division	Ninian Park	1–1	Bob Taylor 79'	Nicky Platnauer 18'	6,358	
17 Dec 1988	Third Division	Ashton Gate Stadium	2–0	Rob Newman 4'; Nigel Hawkins 82'		7,493	
Cardiff City are promoted to Third Division 1987–88
Cardiff City are relegated to Fourth Division 1985–86
25 Jan 1986	Third Division	Ashton Gate Stadium	2–1	Steve Neville, Gary Marshall	Paul Wheeler	7,541	
14 Sep 1985	Third Division	Ninian Park	3–1	Alan Walsh 44', 78'; Howard Pritchard 86'	Graham Withey 75'	4,412	
Cardiff City are relegated to Third Division 1984–85
Bristol City are promoted to Third Division 1983–84
Cardiff City are promoted to Second Division 1982–83
Bristol City are relegated to Fourth Division 1981–82; Cardiff City are relegated to Third Division 1981–82
Bristol City are relegated to Third Division 1980–81
20 Apr 1981	Second Division	Ninian Park	3–2	Kevin Mabbutt 39'; Jimmy Mann 57', 89'	Steve Grapes 7'; Peter Kitchen 69'	5,575	
26 Dec 1980	Second Division	Ashton Gate Stadium	0–0			15,039	
Bristol City are releged to Second Division 1979–80
Bristol City are promoted to First Division 1975–76; Cardiff City are promoted to Second Division 1975–76
Cardiff City are relegated to Third Division 1974–75
26 Dec 1974	Second Division	Ashton Gate Stadium	0–0			12,484	
14 Sep 1974	Second Division	Ninian Park	1–0	Keith Fear 46'		8,858	
19 Aug 1974	League Cup	Ashton Gate Stadium	2–1	Gerry Sweeney 31'; Geoff Merrick 55'	Jimmy McInch 72'	8,813	
2 Feb 1974	Second Division	Ashton Gate Stadium	3–2	Trevor Tainton 4'; Gerry Sweeney 74' (pen.), 90'	Leighton Phillips 15'; Andy McCullough 26'	24,487	
15 Dec 1973	Second Division	Ninian Park	1–0	Don Gillies 79'		9,368	
26 Dec 1972	Second Division	Ashton Gate Stadium	1–0	Gerry Gow 65' (pen.)		20,490	
23 Sep 1972	Second Division	Ninian Park	3–1	Gerry Gow 9' (pen.); John Galley 12'; Brian Drysdale 70'	Gary Bell 22' (pen.)	14,102	
26 Apr 1972	Second Division	Ninian Park	3–2	Peter Spiring 9', 63'; Gerry Gow 20' (pen.)	Alan Warboys 32'; Bobby Woodruff 82'	17,227	
31 Aug 1971	Second Division	Ashton Gate Stadium	2–0	John Galley 22'; Gerry Gow 51'		23,525	
3 Apr 1971	Second Division	Ninian Park	1–0		Ken Wimshurst 4' (own goal)	24,368	
29 Aug 1970	Second Division	Ashton Gate Stadium	1–0	Gerry Sharpe 84'		24,969	
29 Dec 1969	Second Division	Ninian Park	1–0		John Toshack 90'	18,479	
23 Aug 1969	Second Division	Ashton Gate Stadium	2–0		Brian Clark 74'; Ronnie Bird 82' (pen.)	23,237	
25 Jan 1969	Second Division	Ninian Park	3–0		Brian Clark 18', 45'; Peter King 68'	26,210	
28 Sep 1968	Second Division	Ashton Gate Stadium	3–0		Peter King 65'; John Toshack 73'; Barrie Jones 78'	20,632	
2 Mar 1968	Second Division	Ninian Park	1–0	John Galley 64'		15,334	
14 Oct 1967	Second Division	Ashton Gate Stadium	1–1	Chris Crowe 57'	Bobby Brown 42'	15,609	
31 Dec 1966	Second Division	Ninian Park	5–1	Gerry Sharpe 61'	Bobby Brown 15', 73'; Gordon Low 41' (o.g.); Ronnie Bird 46', 62'	12,306	
27 Aug 1966	Second Division	Ashton Gate Stadium	2–1	Gordon Low 37'	John Toshack 19' (pen.); George Andrews 54'	11,952	
18 Mar 1966	Second Division	Ninian Park	2–1	Brian Clark 82'	Peter King 15'; John Toshack 40'	13,405	
25 Sep 1965	Second Division	Ashton Gate Stadium	1–1	John Atyeo 47'	Bernard Lewis 70'	15,300	
Bristol City are promoted to Second Division 1964–65
Cardiff City are relegated to Second Division 1961–62
Bristol City are relegated to Third Division 1959–60; Cardiff City are promoted to First Division 1959–60
16 Jan 1960	Second Division	Ashton Gate Stadium	3–0		Joe Bonson 43'; Peter McCall 52' (o.g.); Graham Moore 89'	18,184	
5 Sep 1959	Second Division	Ninian Park	4–2	John Atyeo 37'; Wally Hinshelwood 67'	Colin Hudson 4', 18'; Johnny Watkins 19'; Colin Baker 24'	22,545	
27 Dec 1958	Second Division	Ninian Park	1–0		Tommy Burden 3' (o.g.)	27,146	
26 Dec 1958	Second Division	Ashton Gate Stadium	3–2	Bobby Etheridge 28'; John Atyeo 49'	Brian Walsh 32'; Joe Bonson 67', 71'	27,570	
7 Apr 1958	Second Division	Ashton Gate Stadium	2–0	Bobby Etheridge 59'; John Atyeo 61'		25,723	
4 Apr 1958	Second Division	Ninian Park	3–2	Bobby Etheridge 22'; John Atyeo 36'; Bert Tindill 89'	Ron Hewitt 4', 5'	15,567	
Cardiff City are relegated to Second Division 1956–57
Bristol City are promoted to Second Division 1954–55
Cardiff City are promoted to First Division 1951–52
Cardiff City are promoted to Second Division 1946–47
7 Apr 1947	Third Division South	Ninian Park	1–1	Sid Williams	Stan Richards	49,310	
4 Apr 1947	Third Division South	Ashton Gate Stadium	2–1	Don Clark, Sammy Collins	Billy Rees	32,535	
No competitive football took place between 1939 and 1945 due to World War II
1 Apr 1939	Third Division South	Ashton Gate Stadium	1–1	Dick Armstrong	Harry Egan	10,003	
11 Jan 1939	Third Division South	Ninian Park	2–1	Lew Booth	Ritchie Smith, George Walton	8,645	
5 Mar 1938	Third Division South	Ashton Gate Stadium	1–0		Jimmy Collins	38,953	
15 Dec 1937	FA Cup	Ashton Gate Stadium	2–0		Jimmy Collins (2)	23,050	
11 Dec 1937	FA Cup	Ninian Park	1–1	Joe Brain	Bert Turner	25,472	
23 Oct 1937	Third Division South	Ninian Park	0–0			17,858	
1 May 1937	Third Division South	Ashton Gate Stadium	2–1	Jack Haycox, Dick Armstrong	Jack Hick (og)	4,360	
14 Sep 1936	Third Division South	Ninian Park	3–1	Willie White	Reg Pugh, Albert Pinxton, Les Talbot	24,936	
28 Mar 1936	Third Division South	Ninian Park	1–0		Reg Keating	9,755	
23 Nov 1935	Third Division South	Ashton Gate Stadium	2–0		Jack Diamond, Joe Roberts	10,350	
4 May 1935	Third Division South	Ashton Gate Stadium	4–0	Albert Banfield, Ernie Brinton, Ted Harston, Leo Loftus		5,558	
22 Dec 1934	Third Division South	Ninian Park	3–3	Ted Harston (2), Leo Loftus	Harry Riley, Billy Bassett, Reg Keating	7,043	
24 Mar 1934	Third Division South	Ashton Gate Stadium	3–0	Joe Riley (2), Tommy Foy		7,186	
11 Nov 1933	Third Division South	Ninian Park	5–1	Syd Homer, Leo Loftus, Jimmy Heale, Gordon Reed (2)	Jack Galbraith	9,090	
15 Apr 1933	Third Division South	Ashton Gate Stadium	3–1	Ted Bowen (3)	George Russell	7,176	
3 Dec 1932	Third Division South	Ninian Park	1–1	Albert Keating	Les Jones	6,115	
Bristol City are relegated to Third Division South 1931–32
Cardiff City are relegated to Third Division South 1930–31
14 Feb 1931	Second Division	Ninian Park	1–0	Bertie Williams		11,780	
11 Oct 1930	Second Division	Ashton Gate Stadium	1–0	Sidney Elliott		19,447	
26 Dec 1929	Second Division	Ninian Park	1–1	Percy Vials	Harry Wake	25,244	
25 Dec 1929	Second Division	Ashton Gate Stadium	2–0	Arthur Johnson, Bertie Williams		17,140	
Cardiff City are relegated to Second Division 1928–29
Bristol City are promoted to Second Division 1926–27
Bristol City are relegated to Third Division South 1923–24
23 Feb 1924	FA Cup	Ninian Park	3–0		Jimmy Gill (2), Joe Clennell	50,000	
Bristol City are promoted to Second Division 1922–23
Cardiff City are promoted to First Division 1920–21
22 Jan 1921	Second Division	Ninian Park	1–0		Albert Barnett	42,000	
15 Jan 1921	Second Division	Ashton Gate Stadium	0–0			35,000	
Cardiff City join The Football League 1920–21
21 Feb 1920	FA Cup	Ashton Gate Stadium	2–1	Bert Neesam, Tommy Howarth	George Beare	32,452	
9 Jan 1915	FA Cup	Ashton Gate Stadium	2–0	Eddie Burton (2)		15,000	

== See also ==
- Cultural relationship between the Welsh and the English
