= Gordon Parr =

English footballer (1938–2025)

Personal information
- Full name: Gordon John Parr
- Date of birth: 6 December 1938
- Place of birth: Bristol, England
- Date of death: 13 October 2025 (aged 86)
- Position: Right half

Youth career
- Bristol Boys

Senior career*
Years	Team	Apps	(Gls)
1957–1972	Bristol City	287	(4)
1972–1973	Waterford	25	(1)
197?–197?	Minehead		
- * Club domestic league appearances and goals

Gordon John Parr (6 December 1938 – 13 October 2025) was an English footballer who played as a right half. He made over 280 Football League appearances in the years after the Second World War.

== Career ==
Parr played locally for Bristol Boys whom he captained. Pat Beasley signed Parr in February 1957 for Bristol City as a speedy, tough tackling and ball winning wing half. Bristol City had a disastrous six match run in December 1957 which included five defeats whilst conceding 24 goals. Parr made his debut as a replacement for Alan Williams in the Second Division at left half v Middlesbrough on 28 December 1957 as a 0–0 draw brought the poor defensive run to an end.

Parr made only two appearances in 1957–58 and none in the next two seasons of Second Division football. The first two seasons back in the Third Division also saw him consigned to reserve team football. With the "Robins" languishing in mid table the following season Parr was given a second chance. By this time he was more of a defensive midfielder marking tightly but retaining his earlier tough tackling style. Parr replaced David Pyle at right half early in 1962–63 making 16 appearances and playing in the two Third round FA Cup ties with Aston Villa.

Bobby Etheridge began the following season in the right half position but Parr replaced him with Bristol City lying 14th in the table. Parr remained at right half for the rest of season 1963–64 making 39 appearances scoring two goals as City climbed the table to finish 5th. He also played in all of the five FA Cup ties as City lost 5–1 at Sunderland in the 4th round. He started as right half in the following season and made 21 appearances scoring one goal before first Terry Bush and then Chuck Drury completed the season in the right half position as Bristol City finished runners up in the Third Division.

In the first season back in the Second Division 1965–66 Parr regained the right half position after injury to Chuck Drury and ended the season in possession of the shirt making 17+1 appearances scoring one goal. The goal came in the last game of the season as City won 4–1 v Ipswich Town in the final match of John Atyeo's long career with Bristol City. After the 5th-place finish of 1965–66 followed a succession of seasons fighting to avoid relegation. In 1966–67 City finished 15th and Parr made 38 appearances at right half in a defence of Mike Gibson, Tony Ford, Alec Briggs, Parr, Jack Connor and Gordon Low that missed only 7 games between them in the whole season. The same defence played in the 5th round FA Cup tie as City lost 2–0 at Tottenham Hotspur.

Parr switched to a central defensive role at left half replacing Low as new signing Ken Wimshurst took the right half shirt in a midfield position. He also deputised at full back making 36 appearances in 1967–68 as City finished 19th but again enjoyed an FA Cup run to the 5th round before losing 2–0 at Leeds United. Parr and Jack Connor were an ever-present central defensive pairing in 1968–69 making 42 appearances as City rose to 16th. Parr made a further 38 appearances with new central defensive partner Dickie Rooks signed from Middlesbrough in 1968–69 with Bristol City finishing in a respectable 14th place. Parr continued alongside Rooks in the following season making 31+2 appearances as City slipped to 19th place. He played in 8 of the 9 League Cup ties as City lost 3–1 on aggregate after extra time in the two legged semi final.

In his final season at Ashton Gate Parr made only 2+3 appearances in 1971–72. He moved to Waterford the League of Ireland champions on a free transfer. He won his first senior medal as the Blues retained their League Championship and this gave Parr the opportunity to play in the 1972–73 European Cup against AC Omonia, although briefly, as Waterford lost in the 1st knockout round despite winning the home leg. Parr returned to play two seasons in the Western League with Minehead before retiring.

== Later life and death ==
After retiring from playing Parr returned to his earlier profession as a self-employed electrician living in Abbots Leigh near Bristol.

Parr died on 13 October 2025, at the age of 86.
