= Mike Thresher =

English footballer

Personal information
- Full name: Theodore Michael Thresher
- Date of birth: 9 March 1931
- Place of birth: Cullompton, Devon, England
- Date of death: 28 December 1999 (aged 68)
- Place of death: Bristol, England
- Position: Left back

Senior career*
Years	Team	Apps	(Gls)
195?–1954	Chard Town		
1954–1965	Bristol City	415	(1)
1965–196?	Bath City		
- Chard Town
- * Club domestic league appearances and goals

Theodore Michael Thresher (9 March 1931-28 December 1999) was an English footballer who played at left back. He made over 370 Football League appearances in the years after the Second World War.

== Career ==
Mike Thresher was one of six footballing brothers who all played locally for Chard Town in Somerset; Mike also represented the RAF. Pat Beasley signed Thresher in January 1954 from Chard Town for Bristol City. Mike Thresher made his debut at left back in the Third Division South in a 2-0 win at Reading on 27 December 1954. Thresher retained the left back for the rest of the season 1954-55 ahead of Jack Bailey and Norman Jackson. The season ended with Bristol City winning promotion as champions. Thresher continued his full back partnership with Ivor Guy in the Second Division in 1955-56 making 35 appearances. In 1956-57 Mike Thresher was a regular again making 37 appearances at left back alongside both Jack Bailey and Ivor Guy. As the "Robins" slipped down the Second Division table finishing in 17th place Thresher made 41 appearances in 1957-58. Thresher partnered new signing Gordon Hopkinson from Doncaster Rovers in the 1958-59 season as City rose to 10th place. Thresher made 41 appearances and starred in the two 4th round FA Cup ties v Blackpool when opposed by an ageing Stanley Matthews. City lost 0-1 in the replaty at Blackpool. Thresher had another new right back partner in Roger Collinson in 1959-60. Thresher made 40 appearances in the relegation season as Bristol City finished bottom of the Second Division. Back in the Third Division in 1960-61 Thresher made 41 appearances and played in all five FA Cup ties as Bristol City reached the 4th round before a 1-5 defeat at Leicester City. Thresher aestablished a new partnership for the next three seasons with Alec Briggs playing at right back. Thresher made 41 appearances as Bristol City finished 6th in 1961-62. THresher made a further 41 appearances in 1962-63. The following season 1963-64 saw Thresher make 39 appearances and score his only League goal in a 1-1 draw at Southend United on 30 November 1963 as Bristol City finished 5th in the Third Division. City again reached the 4th round of the FA Cup this time losing 1-6 at Sunderland with Thresher playing in all five ties. When Bristol City finished runners up and won promotion to the Second Division in 1964-65 Thresher made only 7 appearances losing his place at left back to Alec Briggs as local boy Tony Ford was ever present at right back. Mike Thresher moved to Bath City on a free transfer in July 1965. Subsequently, he rejoined Chard Town.

After football Mike Thresher worked in the family building firm until his wife's death in February 1995 when he was living in Hambridge. He was survived by his son Graham, daughters Sandra and Alison.

== Honours ==
with Bristol City

- Football League Third Division South winner: 1954–55
