= Roger Peters =

English footballer

Lou Peters
Personal information
- Full name: Roger Douglas Peters
- Date of birth: 5 March 1944 (age 82)
- Place of birth: Cheltenham, England
- Position: Outside left

Senior career*
Years	Team	Apps	(Gls)
1961–1968	Bristol City	158	(25)
1968–1970	Bournemouth	7	(3)
- Bath City

International career
196?	England Youth		
- * Club domestic league appearances and goals

Roger Douglas "Lou" Peters (born 5 March 1944) was an English footballer who played as an outside left. He made over 190 Football League appearances in the years after the Second World War.

== Career ==
Lou Peters played youth football for Bristol City. Peters signed as a professional for Bristol City in March 1961. Manager Fred Ford gave Peters his league debut at outside right in the final Third Division match in 1960–61 in a 3–0 win v Brentford on 29 April 1961. Jimmy Rogers was the regular outside right as City rose to 6th place in 1961–62. Peters started the season at outside left but had to share the left wing duties with Jantzen Derrick and made only 13 appearances scoring his first goal in the final game of the season on 28 April 1962 in a 2–2 draw v Crystal Palace. Peters had a mid season spell in the side the following season, firstly on the right wing in place of Alex Tait and then on the left wing in place of Derrick. Peters made 19 appearances scoring three goals as the "Robins" slipped to 14th place in the table in 1962–63. In 1963-64 Bristol City recovered to 5th place in the Third Division but Peters failed to make the first team with Derrick playing outside right and new signing Peter Hooper the regular on the left wing. Peters returned to the left wing at the start of the following season making 40 appearances scoring six goals including 2 goals in the 3–0 win v Port Vale on 27 February 1965. This was the promotion season as Bristol City finished runners up in the Third Division. Peters started the Second Division campaign in the outside right position with Hooper on the left wing but switched to the left wing when Derrick replaced Hooper in October. In 1965-66 Bristol City finished 5th in the Second Division and Peters made 35 appearances scoring six goals. Bristol City struggled against relegation for much of 1966–67. The emergence of Danny Bartley on the left wing at the start of the season restricted Peters and Derrick to sharing the outside right position but at Christmas Peters reclaimed the outside left position with City lying 19th and retained the no.11 shirt for the rest of the season as City finished clear of relegation in 15th place. Peters made 28 appearances and was top scorer with nine goals in 1966-67 including a run of 7 goals in the final 12 league games. Peters also netted two goals against Halifax Town in the FA Cup as City reached the 5th round before losing 0–2 at Tottenham Hotspur. The following season saw Bristol City stave off relegation after a season long struggle finishing in 19th place. Peters had several spells in the first team making 22 appearances without scoring on the left wing sharing duties with Bartley in 1967–68. Peters also played in 3 FA Cup ties as City reached the 5th round again before losing 0–2 at Leeds United.

Peters joined Bournemouth for £5,000 in June 1968. Peters moved on the play under ex City player Arnold Rodgers the manager of Bath City in 1970.

After Peters finished playing football he spent over 25 years as a consultant for Sun Life of Canada working in both Bristol and Plymouth. In 1997 Peters was back working in Bristol and living in nearby Weston-in-Gordano.

== Personal life ==
On 17 July 1965 Peters married Joyce, and together they have two daughters Sarah and Louise.

== Honours ==
with Bristol City

- Football League Third Division runners up: 1964–65
