= Trevor Jacobs =

Trevor Jacobs may refer to:

- Trevor Jacobs (footballer) (1946–2014), English footballer who played in the English Football League
- Trevor Jacobs (politician) (born 1976), American politician serving in the Kansas House of Representatives

== See also ==
- Trevor Jacob (born 1993), American snowboarder, YouTuber, and aviator
