= Bert Tindill =

English footballer (1926–1973)

Personal information
- Full name: Herbert Tindill
- Date of birth: 31 December 1926
- Place of birth: Hemsworth, England
- Date of death: 10 July 1973 (aged 46)
- Place of death: South Hiendley, England
- Position: Inside forward

Youth career
- –: South Hiendley

Senior career*
Years	Team	Apps	(Gls)
1944–1958	Doncaster Rovers	402	(122)
1958–1959	Bristol City	56	(29)
1959–1962	Barnsley	98	(29)
1962–19??	Frickley Colliery	?	(?)
- * Club domestic league appearances and goals

Herbert "Bert" Tindill (31 December 1926 – 10 July 1973) was an English footballer who played as an inside forward. He made over 550 Football League appearances in the years after the Second World War.

== Career ==
=== Doncaster Rovers ===
Bert Tindill played locally for South Hiendley, in Yorkshire, and in July 1944 Tindill joined the Doncaster Rovers. Tindill made his league debut at outside right for Doncaster Rovers v Rochdale in a 2–1 win on 31 August 1946. Tindill netted a hat-trick on 7 September 1946 at New Brighton in a 5–2 win. Doncaster Rovers won promotion as champions of Third Division North in season 1946–47 when Tindill made 9 appearances and scored seven goals before Jack Kirkaldie played on the right wing for the rest of the season. Tindill had more spells at outside right in season 1947–48 when Doncaster Rovers were relegated from the Second Division in 21st position. Tindill made 20 appearances scoring three goals while sharing the right wing duties with Kirkaldie. When Doncaster Rovers finished 3rd in the Third Division in season 1948-49Tindill missed the opening games but made 36 consecutive appearances mostly at outside right scoring nine goals. Tindill was one of five ever presents in the league in season 1949–50 when Doncaster Rovers again won promotion as champions of the Third Division North. Tindill made 42 appearances mainly at outside right scoring eight goals. Inside left Peter Doherty was top scorer with 27 goals. Tindill was again ever present in the league in season 1950–51 as Doncaster Rovers finished in mid table 11th place in the Second Division. Tindill played in all five positions across the forward line scoring 13 goals from 42 appearances. Doherty with 14 goals was again top scorer. Tindill completed a consecutive run of 139 league games in November 1951 as Doncaster Rovers finished in 16th place. Tindill missed only two league games making 40 appearances and was top scorer with 11 goals in 1951–52. Doncaster Rovers continued to occupy a mid table 13th position in the Second Division in 1952–53. Tindill was the sole ever present in the side making 42 appearances mostly on the right or left wing scoring 10 goals. Tindill was the regular outside right in season 1953–54 when Doncaster Rovers finished 12th in Division Two. Tindill made 39 appearances missing only 3 matches and scored 12 goals finishing as second top scorer. Doncaster Rovers struggled in 1954–55 finishing 18th in the Second Division. Tindill began the season on the left wing until December and then played in all of the five forward positions over the remainder of the season. Overall Tindill made 39 appearances scoring 13 goals as second top scorer. Tindill played in all seven FA Cup ties as Doncaster Rovers lost 1–2 in the 5th round at Birmingham City. Tindill played in the 4th round ties against Aston Villa that began at Doncaster with a 2–2 draw and stretched to replays at Villa Park 2–2, Maine Road 1–1, Hillsborough 0–0 and was finally decided after extra time at the Hawthorns where "Donny" won 3–1. These five matches took place inside an 18-day period. Doncaster Rovers struggled again in 1955–56 in 17th position in the Second Division. Tindill was top scorer with 18 goals scored while playing mainly at inside right and inside left. Tindill also scored goals in five successive league games in March/April 1956 making 38 appearances. Tindill played in all four FA Cup ties as Doncaster Rovers again reached the 5th round losing 0–2 v Tottenham Hotspur. Tindill was joint top scorer for Doncaster Rovers in season 1956–57 with 15 goals from 31 appearances mainly at centre forward. Alick Jeffrey also netted 15 goals from only 13 matches before suffering a broken leg in an England Under 23 international played at Ashton Gate. In season 1957–58 Tindill played in a variety of forward positions making 23 appearances scoring six goals before leaving Doncaster Rovers who finished bottom of the Second Division at the end of the season and were relegated.

=== Bristol City ===
Peter Doherty signed Tindill for £8,000 in February 1958 for Bristol City. At this point Bristol City were lying in 21st place in the Second Division. Bert Tindill made his debut for Bristol City at outside left deputising for Johnny Watkins in a 0–1 defeat v Rotherham United. This was the start of a run of 14 appearances by Tindill during which he scored 10 goals and Bristol City won seven matches and drew two rising to 17th place and avoided relegation. Tindill scored two hat-tricks in successive games during this spell in a 5–0 win v Barnsley on 12 April 1958 and in a 4–3 win at Fulham on 19 April. Tindill began the following season 1958–59 at inside right alongside John Atyeo at centre forward. Tindill was the sole ever present making 42 appearances and second top scorer with 19 goals. Tindill opened with two goals in each of the first two matches a 6–1 win v Rotherham United and a 7–4 victory at Barnsley and then repeated the feat later in the season in January 1959. Bristol City began the season in the promotion positions in the Second Division but fell away as the season progressed to finish in 10th place. In the FA Cup Tindill scored in the 2–0 win at Doncaster Rovers in the 3rd round and in the 1–1 draw when Blackpool & Stanley Matthews visited Ashton Gate in the 4th round.

=== Barnsley ===
Tindill moved to Barnsley in an exchange deal in July 1959. Tindill moved to Barnsley at a value of £5,500 while Malcolm Graham & Johnny McCann joined Bristol City at a combined value of £20,000. Tindill moved on to Frickley Colliery in July 1962.

After retiring from playing Bert Tindill ran the Lundwood Hotel in South Hiendley between Barnsley & Doncaster before suffering a fatal heart attack in July 1973.

== Honours ==
with Doncaster Rovers

- Football League Third Division North winner: 1946–47
- Football League Third Division North winner: 1949–50
