= Cyril Williams (footballer) =

English footballer (1921-1980)

Personal information
- Full name: Cyril Edward Williams
- Date of birth: 17 November 1921
- Place of birth: Bristol, England
- Date of death: January 1980 (aged 58)
- Place of death: Weston-super-Mare, Somerset, England
- Position: Inside left

Senior career*
Years	Team	Apps	(Gls)
1938–1948	Bristol City	78	(27)
1948–1951	West Bromwich Albion	71	(19)
1951–1958	Bristol City	218	(42)
1958–1966	Chippenham Town	??	(?)

Managerial career
- 1966–1967: Gloucester City
- 1958–1966: Chippenham Town player manager
- * Club domestic league appearances and goals

Cyril Edward Williams (17 November 1921 – January 1980) was an English footballer who played as an inside left. He made over 360 Football League appearances in the years after the Second World War.

== Career ==
When on song Cyril Williams, known as "Twinkletoes" by the Bristol City fans, could tackle and torment opponents with a dribble followed by an imaginative pass with greatly judged weight. Williams was a humorous individual who it is said once pleaded "You can't do that on Christmas Day" with a referee about to send City goalkeeper Frank Clack off after a fracas at a Christmas Day match in 1948 at Aldershot. The referee reversed his decision and City left with a 0–0 draw. At his most dangerous when a forward, like John Atyeo, nodded a hefty City clearance down to Williams who would place a precision through ball for the knowing forward to sprint on to.

Cyril Williams played locally in Bristol. Bob Hewison signed Williams in May 1939 for Bristol City without making the first team in the three league matches in the truncated 1939–40 season. Williams played as a guest for Reading and Tottenham Hotspur during the Second World War. During the 1939–1945 war time Williams also made 53 appearances scoring 21 goals in regional league matches, 13 appearances scoring 6 goals in other leagues and 28 appearances scoring 11 goals in war time cup competitions for Bristol City. Cyril Williams continued his career for Bristol City after the war. Cyril Williams finally made his League debut at inside left in a 3–4 defeat at Aldershot on 31 August 1946 at the age of 24 years. When Bristol City finished 3rd in the Division Three South Williams made 41 appearances, missing only one match, scoring 17 goals including a hat-trick in the 3–1 win at Mansfield Town on 17 May 1947. Williams was part of a goalscoring forward trio of Bill Thomas 14 goals and Don Clark a record 36 goals as Bristol City were highest scorers in the Division with 94 goals. The following season inside right Len Townsend joined from Brentford F.C. scoring 31 goals, Clark netted 22 goals and Willams 10 goals from 37 appearances. This trio scored 63 of the 77 League goals in 1947–48. Williams also scored an FA Cup hat-trick in a 9–2 win v Dartford in a 1st round replay on 6 December 1947. Townsend & Clark also scored hat-tricks v Dartford in the same game. In June 1948 Cyril Williams moved to West Bromwich Albion in exchange for Cliff Edwards plus £500. There was thunderous wrath among "Robins" fans at the sale of their ball playing schemer with the silky skills who had been the creative force behind the ascent up the Third Division South table since the war. West Bromwich Albion finished as runners up in the Second Division in 1948–49 with Williams making 31 appearances scoring 9 goals including another hat-trick in a 5–2 win v Grimsby Town on 11 December 1948. Williams also played in all 4 FA Cup ties as West Brom reached the 6th round losing 0–1 at Wolverhampton Wanderers. Playing in the First Division in 1949–50 Williams made 26 appearances scoring 8 goals. After 14 appearances scoring two goals in 1950–51 for West Brom Cyril Williams moved back to Bristol City in August 1951 for £4,500. Williams scored on his return in a 3–1 win v Newport County on 18 August 1951. He played in both inside forward and wing half positions in making 39 appearances scoring 6 goals in 1951–52. The following season Bristol City rose to 5th place in the Third Division South, near neighbours Bristol Rovers finished as champions, Williams made 42 appearances outscoring John Atyeo with 17 goals including a hat-trick in a 5–0 win v Crystal Palace on 13 September 1952. In 1953–54 Williams played first at left half then at inside left making 39 appearances scoring 4 goals with Bristol City rising to 3rd place. When Bristol City won promotion as Third Division South champions in 1954–55 Williams again made 39 appearances scoring 4 goals starting at inside left and ending as left half. In 1955–56 in the Second Division Williams played regularly as left half making 34 appearances and 3 goals. The following season in 1956–57 Williams made 22 appearances scoring 8 goals but only made 3 appearances in his final season at Bristol City in 1957–58.

In July 1958 Williams was appointed player manager of Chippenham Town in the Western League. In August 1966 he spent a single season as manager of Gloucester City in the Southern League Midland Division. After football Cyril Williams ran the Greylands Hotel in Weston-super-Mare before his tragic death in a car crash in January 1980. Alec Briggs a Bristol City full back of the 1960s was married to a daughter of Cyril Williams.

== Honours ==
with West Bromwich Albion

- Football League Second Division runners up: 1948–49

with Bristol City

- Football League Third Division South winner: 1954–55
