= Sandy Torrance =

Scottish footballer

Personal information
- Full name: Alexander Donaldson Torrance
- Date of birth: 29 September 1901
- Place of birth: Glasgow, Scotland
- Date of death: 14 April 1941 (aged 39)
- Place of death: Bristol, England
- Height: 5 ft 8 in (1.73 m)
- Position: Left half

Youth career
- Renfrew juniors

Senior career*
Years	Team	Apps	(Gls)
1921–1928	Bristol City	167	(10)
1928–19??	Bath City		
- * Club domestic league appearances and goals

Alexander Donaldson Torrance (29 September 1901 – 14 April 1941) was a Scottish footballer who played as a left half.

== Career ==
Alexander "Sandy" Torrance initially played locally with Renfrew juniors. Joe Palmer signed Torrance in June 1921 for Bristol City. Torrance played alongside Bert Neesam and had a benefit match v Gillingham on 15 January 1927 in which Tot Walsh scored 6 goals in a 9–4 win although Torrance himself did not play. Torrance joined Bath City in July 1928. A Fire Guard in the Second World War, Sandy Torrance died on 14 April 1941 after injury in an air raid on Bedminster, Bristol on 11 April 1941.

== Honours ==
with Bristol City

- Football League Third Division South winner: 1922–23
