= Jock Taylor (footballer, born 1909) =

Scottish footballer

Personal information
- Full name: John Swinley Taylor
- Date of birth: 17 September 1906
- Place of birth: Kelty, Fife, Scotland
- Date of death: 14 November 1967
- Place of death: Bristol, England
- Positions: Left half; left back

Senior career*
Years	Team	Apps	(Gls)
- St Johnstone
- Cowdenbeath
1926–1927	Raith Rovers	2	(0)
1927–1934	Bristol City	148	(0)
1934–1935	Halifax Town	32	(0)
1935–1937	Clapton Orient	30	(0)
1937–1938	Bristol City	0	(0)

Managerial career
- Cork coach
- H.B.S. coach
- * Club domestic league appearances and goals

John Swinley Taylor (17 September 1906 – 14 November 1967) was a Scottish footballer, who played as a left half & left back. He made 210 Football League appearances in the years after the First World War.

== Career ==
Jock Taylor played in Scotland for St Johnstone, Cowdenbeath and Raith Rovers. Bob Hewison signed Taylor in October 1926 for Bristol City and he made his debut at left half in the FA Cup 0-2 defeat at Bournemouth on 15 December 1926. Taylor did not appear in the league side in 1926-27 when Bristol City won the Third Division South championship.

Taylor made two appearances at full back late in 1927-28 then established a regular place at left half in the latter half of 1928-29 making 21 appearances as Bristol City just escaped relegation finishing 20th. Taylor made 33 appearances at left half as City again finished 20th in 1929-30. Although Taylor lost the left half position to Ernie Brinton in September 1930, he made 23 appearances mainly at right half. When Bristol City were relegated from the Second Division in 22nd place in 1931-32 Taylor reappeared from October onwards as the regular left back making 33 appearances. Taylor continued in the left back position making 27 appearances in 1932-33 but only nine appearances in 1933-34. Taylor moved to Halifax Town in May 1934. Taylor joined Clapton Orient in July 1935. Taylor finally rejoined Bristol City in 1937 but failed to make the first team in his second spell with the club. Taylor coached Cork in Ireland and H.B.S. in the Netherlands after retiring as a player. He returned to Bristol to coach local club Horfield Sports and ran a sports shop in Totterdown before his death in 1967.
