= Sid Williams (footballer) =

English footballer

Personal information
- Full name: Sidney Frederick Williams
- Date of birth: 21 December 1919
- Place of birth: Bristol, England
- Date of death: 9 June 2003 (aged 83)
- Place of death: Patchway, England
- Position: Outside left

Youth career
- 19??–1937: Eastville United

Senior career*
| Years | Team | Apps | (Gls) |
| 1937–1952 | Bristol City | 100 | (11) |
| 1952–19?? | Stonehouse | | |
- * Club domestic league appearances and goals

Sidney Frederick Williams (21 December 1919 – 9 June 2003) was an English footballer who played as an outside left. He made 100 Football League appearances in the years after the Second World War.

== Career ==
Williams played locally for Eastville United in Bristol. Bob Hewison signed Williams as an amateur in July 1937 from Eastville United for Bristol City. During the Second World War Williams represented Northern Command and guested for Darlington. He turned professional with Bristol City in July 1945. Williams made his debut in Third Division South replacing Jack Hargreaves on the left wing in a 4–0 win v Bristol Rovers on 1 February 1947. He made 13 appearances and scored 3 goals, all in the space of 4 matches in April 1947, as Bristol City finished 3rd in 1946–47. Williams began the following season 1947–48 at outside left but was replaced in October 1947 when 36-year-old Harry Osman was signed from Millwall. Williams ended the season with a run of games at outside right and made 28 appearances scoring 2 goals. Williams made only 13 appearances scoring 1 goal in 1948–49 as the "Robins" searched for a regular left winger to partner inside left Vic Barney newly signed from Reading. Bristol City continued to languish in the lower part of the Third Division South in 1949–50 finishing 15th with Williams starting the season at outside right and finishing on the left wing making 17 appearances scoring 3 goals. Williams did score both goals in a 2–0 Gloucestershire Cup win over Bristol Rovers. In 1950–51 Williams reclaimed the left wing position from Tommy Rudkin at the outset but then lost the shirt when Jack Boxley was signed from Stourbridge in October 1950. He made 25 appearances scoring 2 goals but played in all 5 FA Cup ties as Bristol City reached the 5th round eventually losing 2–0 to Birmingham City. In his final season 1951–52 Williams made only 4 appearances without scoring then joined local South Gloucestershire team Stonehouse in June 1952 who were managed by former Bristol City man Bill Thomas. After his playing career ended Williams became a self-employed decorator before retiring in December 1984 when he was living in Patchway near Bristol.
