= Tony Cook (footballer, born 1929) =

English footballer

Personal information
- Full name: Anthony Cook
- Date of birth: 8 October 1929
- Place of birth: Bristol, England
- Date of death: March 1996 (aged 66)
- Place of death: Bristol, England
- Position: Goalkeeper

Youth career
- Durdham Down Adult School, Bristol
- 19??–1950: Clifton St Vincents, Bristol

Senior career*
Years	Team	Apps	(Gls)
1950–1963	Bristol City	320	(0)
1964–1966	Worcester City		
1966–1968	Cinderford Town		
- * Club domestic league appearances and goals

Anthony Cook (8 October 1929 – March 1996) was an English footballer who played as a goalkeeper. He made 320 Football League appearances in the years after the Second World War.

== Career ==
Cook played locally for Durdham Down Adult School and Clifton St Vincents in the Downs League in Bristol. Tony Cook began as a winger in local football only taking a turn in goal when the regular goalkeeper was unable to play. Cook had a trial for Bristol City and saved a penalty in a 0–1 defeat at Southampton on 26 December 1949. Bob Wright signed Cook on his return to Ashton Gate in December 1949 for Bristol City. Frank Coombes was replaced as Bristol City goalkeeper in January 1950 by Syd Morgan who himself had been discovered playing in the Downs League in Bristol. In 1950–51, Morgan contested the goalkeeping position with Con Sullivan who had joined from local Bristol side Horfield Old Boys six months before Cook. Sullivan was ever present in 1951–52. Cook finally got his chance after both Sullivan and Morgan had been tried in 1952–53. Cook made his debut in goal in the Third Division South in a 4–2 win v Swindon Town on 8 November 1952 and completed 29 consecutive appearances to the end of 1952–53 when Bristol City finished in fifth place. Cook made 38 appearances in 1953–54 before Morgan played in the final 8 matches as Bristol City rose to finish in third place. Tony Cook made 23 appearances in the opening games in 1954–55 then broke his arm versus Gillingham on 18 December 1954 when Bob Anderson played in the final 23 matches as Bristol City ended as Third Division South champions. Cook with 20 appearances shared the goalkeeping duties with Anderson in the Second Division in 1955–56. The following 1956–57 season, Cook began the season in goal making 21 appearances with Anderson finishing the season in the team. Cook made only 7 appearances in 1957–58 as Bristol City slipped to 17th in the table. Anderson started 1958–59 as first choice but Cook made 37 appearances and played in the fourth round FA Cup ties against Blackpool when the "Robins" lost 0–1 in a replay. Cook gained a reputation as a saver of penalties and saved six of the nine penalties he faced in 1958–59. Cook was ever present in the relegation season 1959–60 when Bristol City finished 22nd and bottom of the Second Division. Cook made 45 appearances in 1960–61 and in all six FA Cup ties as Bristol City lost 1–5 in the fourth round at Leicester City. Cook was the regular keeper in 1961–62 making 40 appearances as Bristol City finished sixth in the Third Division. Cook started as no.1 in 1962–63 but made only 15 appearances following another broken arm as Ron Nicholls took over. Cook made his final three appearances in the opening three matches of 1963–64 before Mike Gibson took over as the regular keeper.

Cook left on a free transfer in July 1964 and joined Worcester City for two seasons in the Southern League. Cook then spent a further two seasons with Cinderford Town in the Western League. Cook then returned to the Downs League playing for first Manor Farm Boys Club then Sneyd Park.

After his football career Cook worked at Bristol Docks and spent 27 years as a prison officer at Horfield prison in Bristol before retiring in October 1994. He died in Bristol in March 1996.

== Honours ==
with Bristol City

- Football League Third Division South winner: 1954–55
