= Alex Tait (footballer) =

English footballer (1933–2018)

Personal information
- Date of birth: 28 November 1933
- Place of birth: Bedlington, Northumberland, England
- Date of death: December 2018 (aged 85)
- Position: Centre forward

Senior career*
Years	Team	Apps	(Gls)
1952–1960	Newcastle United	32	(8)
1960–1964	Bristol City	117	(38)
1964–1965	Doncaster Rovers	19	(7)
1965–1970	Burton Albion		

International career
	England Youth		(?)

Managerial career
- 1965–70: Burton Albion (player-manager)
- * Club domestic league appearances and goals

Alexander Tait (28 November 1933 - December 2018) was an English footballer who played as a centre forward. He made over 160 Football League appearances in the years after the Second World War.

== Career ==
Born in Bedlington, Tait was an England Youth international who signed in September 1952 as a part-time professional for Newcastle United while qualifying as a mathematics and PE teacher. Alex Tait was the first signing by Fred Ford for £5,000 in June 1960 from Newcastle United for Bristol City. Bristol City had just been relegated to the Third Division as Alex Tait made his debut at centre forward in a 4–0 win v Barnsley on 27 August 1960. Tait retained the no.9 shirt for the rest of the season with John Atyeo playing alongside as the dual strike force at inside right. City finished in mid table 14th position in 1960–61 when Tait made 35 appearances scoring 15 goals and Atyeo top scored with 19 goals. Tait scored two goals in a 2–5 defeat at Grimsby Town and another two goals in a 3–0 win v Newport County. He also played in the FA Cup 4th round replay 1–5 defeat at Leicester City. Both Brian Clark and Barrie Meyer were tried as partner to John Atyeo at the start of 1961–62 but with Bristol City lying in 13th place Tait came back as centre forward in October and held the position until the final two games of the season as Bristol City finished in 6th place in the Third Division. In 1961–62 Tait made 34 appearances scoring 13 goals including two goals in the 6–0 win v Notts County when Atyeo netted the other four goals. In the FA Cup Tait scored in both 1st round ties and then netted a hat-trick in the 8–2 win v Dartford in the 2nd round. The following season Tait began at centre forward but switched to outside right after four matches when Atyeo moved to centre forward and Brian Clark was introduced at inside right. City recovered from 20th place to finish in mid table at 14th with Tait making 37 appearances scoring 10 goals mainly on the right wing but deputising at centre forward for the injured Atyeo in the final games of the season. The "Robins" rose to 5th place in 1963–64 but Jantzen Derrick and Peter Hooper were the regular wingers with Tait making only 11 appearances without scoring when deputising for the regular wingers. Alex Tait moved to Doncaster Rovers in June 1964 and then onto Burton Albion in the summer of 1965 taking over as player manager from Peter Taylor. Burton Albion won promotion to the Premier Division of the Southern League by finishing 3rd in the First Division in the first season of Alex Tait's management.

After retiring from football Alex Tait lived in Tutbury where he became deputy headmaster during 19 years service at Allestree Woodlands comprehensive before retiring in July 1991.

He died in December 2018.
