= Vic Barney =

English footballer (1922–2006)

Personal information
- Full name: Victor Charles Barney
- Date of birth: 3 April 1922
- Place of birth: Stepney, England
- Date of death: 26 May 2006 (aged 84)
- Position: Inside forward

Senior career*
Years	Team	Apps	(Gls)
1945–1946	Oxford City		
1946	Napoli (wartime)		
1946–1948	Reading	45	(12)
1948–1949	Bristol City	28	(4)
1949–1950	Grimsby Town	7	(0)
1950–1952	Headington United		
1952–19??	Guildford City		
- * Club domestic league appearances and goals

Victor Charles Barney (3 April 1922 – 26 May 2006) was an English professional footballer who played as an inside forward.

Barney was an infantryman in the British Army during the Second World War. While in Italy, he was charged with the renovation of the Stadio Arturo Collana and played for Napoli.
