= Jack Boxley =

English footballer

Personal information
- Full name: John Boxley
- Date of birth: 31 May 1931
- Place of birth: Cradley Heath, Birmingham, England
- Date of death: March 2016
- Position: Outside left

Senior career*
Years	Team	Apps	(Gls)
19??–1950	Stourbridge		
1950–1956	Bristol City	193	(34)
1956–1960	Coventry City	92	(17)
1960–1960	Bristol City	12	(0)
1960–196?	Chippenham Town	?	(?)
196?–196?	Welton Rovers	?	(?)
196?–196?	Bath City	?	(?)
- * Club domestic league appearances and goals

John "Jack" Boxley (31 May 1931 – March 2016) was an English footballer who played as an outside left. He made over 290 Football League appearances in the years after the Second World War.

== Career ==
Jack Boxley played locally for Stourbridge F.C. Pat Beasley signed Boxley in October 1950 from Stourbridge Town for Bristol City for £2,000. Jack Boxley made his debut in the Third Division South at outside left for Bristol City in a 2–1 win v Newport County on 14 October 1950. He made 23 appearances scoring two goals in his first season with the "Robins" in 1950–51. After creating numerous goalscoring opportunities for City forwards John Atyeo and Arnold Rodgers, Jack Boxley and Jimmy Rogers left Ashton Gate together to join Coventry City in December 1956. Boxley helped Coventry City gain promotion in season 1958–59 from the newly formed Fourth Division as runners up on goal difference from York City. Boxley returned to Bristol City from Coventry City in August 1960. Boxley had the distinction of scoring Bristol City's first ever goal in the League Cup in October 1960 v Aldershot. Jack Boxley later played Western League football for Chippenham Town and Welton Rovers before playing for his final club Bath City in the Southern League.

After retiring from football Jack Boxley remained close to Ashton Gate working as a car salesman at Winterstoke Garage, just around the corner from the ground, for 34 years before retirement in March 1995. He died in March 2016.

== Honours ==
with Bristol City

- Football League Third Division South winner: 1954–55

with Coventry City

- Football League Fourth Division runner up: 1958–59
