= Bobby Williams (footballer, born 1940) =

English footballer

Personal information
- Full name: Robert Gordon Williams
- Date of birth: 17 February 1940
- Place of birth: Bristol, England
- Position: Inside left

Senior career*
Years	Team	Apps	(Gls)
1958–1965	Bristol City	187	(76)
1965–1967	Rotherham United	47	(13)
1967–1969	Bristol Rovers	28+1	(5)
1969–1971	Reading	60+4	(20)
- AS Oostende
- Cheltenham Town
19??–1972	Weymouth		
- Keynsham Town

Managerial career
- 1972–1987: Reading Youth team manager
- * Club domestic league appearances and goals

Robert Gordon Williams (born 17 February 1940) is an English former professional footballer who played as an inside left. He made over 320 Football League appearances in the years after the Second World War.

== Career ==
Williams played locally in Bristol. Peter Doherty signed Bobby Williams in May 1958 for Bristol City, with Williams joining his boyhood club. Williams moved from Bristol City to Rotherham United in February 1965 for £10,000. Williams joined Bristol Rovers in March 1967. Williams moved to Reading in August 1969.

Bobby Williams then had spells with AS Oostende in Belgium, with Cheltenham Town under the management of former Bristol City player Bobby Etheridge and with Weymouth in the Southern League. Bobby Williams was almost killed in a car crash in September 1972 which despite a playing comeback attempt with local Bristol club Keynsham Town brought an end to his playing career. Williams then joined Reading as their youth team manager.

== Honours ==
with Bristol City

- Football League Third Division runners up: 1964–65
