= John Wren (footballer) =

English footballer (1894–1948)

Jack Wren
Personal information
- Full name: John Edward Wren
- Date of birth: 30 January 1894
- Place of birth: St Werburghs, Bristol, England
- Date of death: 1948 (aged 53–54)
- Height: 5 ft 9 in (1.75 m)
- Position: Half back

Youth career
- Greenbank

Senior career*
| Years | Team | Apps | (Gls) |
| 19??–1919 | Millwall | | |
| 1919–1922 | Bristol City | 104 | (1) |
| 1922–1925 | Notts County | 63 | (0) |
| 1926–19?? | Southport | 6 | (0) |
- * Club domestic league appearances and goals

John Edward Wren (30 January 1894 – 1948) was an English footballer who played at half back for Millwall, Bristol City, Notts County and Southport in the first decade following the First World War playing over 170 Football League games.

== Career ==
Jack Wren was born in St Werburghs Bristol and after playing local football with Greenbank he joined Millwall. After three years with Millwall, during which he made over ?? first-team appearances, Wren moved to the Second Division with Bristol City.

Wren remained with the Ashton Gate club until 1922 making over 100 appearances, before again moving to Notts County.
