= Trevor Jacobs (footballer) =

English footballer

Personal information
- Full name: Trevor Frederick Jacobs
- Date of birth: 28 November 1946
- Place of birth: Bristol, England
- Date of death: 18 January 2014 (aged 67)
- Position: Right back

Senior career*
Years	Team	Apps	(Gls)
1965–1972	Bristol City	130+1	(3)
1972	→ Plymouth Argyle (loan)	4	(0)
1973–1976	Bristol Rovers	82	(3)
- Bideford
- Paulton Rovers
- Clevedon Town
- * Club domestic league appearances and goals

Trevor Frederick Jacobs (28 November 1946 – 18 January 2014) was an English footballer who played as a right back. He made over 210 Football League appearances in the years after the Second World War.

== Career ==
Trevor Jacobs played youth football with Bristol City. Fred Ford signed Jacobs as a professional in July 1965 from apprentice for Bristol City.

== Honours ==
with Bristol Rovers

- Football League Third Division runners up: 1973–74
