= Gary Williams (footballer, born 1963) =

English footballer

Personal information
- Full name: Gary Alan Williams
- Date of birth: 8 June 1963 (age 63)
- Place of birth: Bristol, England
- Height: 5 ft 8 in (1.73 m)
- Positions: Left back; midfielder

Senior career*
Years	Team	Apps	(Gls)
1980–1984	Bristol City	100	(1)
1984	Portsmouth	0	(0)
1985	Swansea City	6	(0)
1985	Bristol Rovers	0	(0)
1985–1991	Oldham Athletic	61	(12)
1991	Heart of Midlothian	0	(0)
1991–1993	Hong Kong		
1993–1994	Bath City	20	(0)
Total		167	(13)
- * Club domestic league appearances and goals

Gary Alan Williams (born 8 June 1963) is an English former footballer who played as a left back in the Football League for Bristol City, Swansea City and Oldham Athletic.

Williams' father, Alan Williams, also played League football.
