= Malcolm Graham (footballer) =

English footballer

Personal information
- Date of birth: 26 January 1934
- Place of birth: Crigglestone, Wakefield, England
- Date of death: 12 September 2015 (aged 81)
- Place of death: Barnsley, England
- Position: Striker

Senior career*
Years	Team	Apps	(Gls)
?–1953	Hall Green		
1953–1959	Barnsley	109	(35)
1959–1960	Bristol City		
1960–1963	Leyton Orient	75	(29)
1963–1964	Queens Park Rangers	21	(7)
1964–1965	Barnsley	20	(5)
1965–?	Buxton		
- Alfreton Town
- * Club domestic league appearances and goals

Malcolm Graham (26 January 1934 – 12 September 2015) was an English footballer who played as a striker, mainly for Barnsley and Leyton Orient.

Graham joined Barnsley from non-league Hall Green in 1953, while still working as a miner at Haigh Colliery. He stayed with Barnsley for several seasons, but left when the club was relegated at the end of the 1958–59 season. After a brief spell at Bristol City, he moved to Leyton Orient for £8000 on 20 June 1960.

At Orient, Graham was part of the team that gained promotion to the First Division in 1961–62, scoring both goals in the 2–0 win over Bury that sent them up on the last day of the season. He was joint top scorer with Dave Dunmore in Orient's single season in the top flight, scoring a hat-trick in the 9–2 thrashing of Chester in the League Cup. However, he left Orient at the end of that season to join Queens Park Rangers. Only staying for one season, he returned to Barnsley before moving back into non-league football.

Graham retired due to a long-standing knee injury while playing for Alfreton Town, and later worked for the East Midlands Gas Board.

Malcolm Graham died in Barnsley on Saturday 12 September 2015.
