= Alois Eisenträger =

German footballer

Personal information
- Full name: Alois Bernhard Eisenträger
- Date of birth: 16 July 1927
- Place of birth: Hamburg, Germany
- Date of death: 10 August 2017 (aged 90)
- Place of death: Clevedon, England
- Position: Inside forward

Youth career
- Hamburger SV

Senior career*
Years	Team	Apps	(Gls)
1948	Herne Bay		
1948–1949	Trowbridge Town		
1949–1958	Bristol City	228	(57)
1958–1959	Merthyr Tydfil		
1959–1961	Chelmsford City	42	(20)
- * Club domestic league appearances and goals

Alois Bernhard "Alec" Eisenträger (16 July 1927 – 10 August 2017) was a German footballer who played as an inside forward.

== Career ==
Eisenträger was made a prisoner of war aged 16, spending the rest of World War II at various different POW camps, up to 1949. Ending finally at a POW camp near Trowbridge, England. He started playing for Trowbridge Town and then in 1949 moved to Bristol City, scoring four goals against Newport County in September of that year. Thus, he was the first German to sign professional papers and play for a British team after World War II. Becoming an integral part of a professional British football team, even before the famous Bert Trautmann moved to Manchester City, who had written to Alois asking him to get him a job as a goalkeeper at Bristol City, with the club declining as they had three goalkeepers already. He gained promotion with the Robins to the Second Division in 1955. Until he left for Merthyr Tydfil in 1958 he had appeared in 246 games for Bristol City, netting 57 times. In 1959, Eisenträger signed for Chelmsford City, making his debut in a 2–2 home draw against Worcester City on 22 August 1959, becoming the joint 250th player to represent the club. Whilst at Chelmsford, Eisenträger scored 23 goals in 54 appearances in all competitions across two seasons. Following his spell at Chelmsford, despite numerous offers from other non-league clubs, Eisenträger retired.

== Personal life ==
After being surrendered by his commanding officer, previously a World War II officer, on an airfield in Breda, the Netherlands, Eisenträger came to England as a teenager. In the early 1950s, Eisenträger married Olwyn Kenna from Pembroke Dock, Wales, having four children with her. After his football career, they moved to Clevedon, where Eisenträger remained until his death in 2017.
