= Bob Anderson (footballer) =

English footballer (1924–1994)

Personal information
- Full name: Robert John Anderson
- Date of birth: 9 November 1924
- Place of birth: Prestwick, Northumberland
- Date of death: 14 November 1994 (aged 70)
- Place of death: Bristol, England
- Position: Goalkeeper

Youth career
- Blackhall Colliery

Senior career*
Years	Team	Apps	(Gls)
1947–1948	Middlesbrough	1	(0)
1948–1951	Blackhall Colliery		
1951–1953	Crystal Palace	38	(0)
1953–1954	Bristol Rovers	10	(0)
1954–1959	Bristol City	106	(0)
Total		155	(0)
- * Club domestic league appearances and goals

Robert John Anderson (9 November 1924 – 14 November 1994) was an English footballer who played as a goalkeeper in the Football League.
