= Bertie Williams =

Welsh footballer

Personal information
- Full name: Albert Williams
- Date of birth: 4 March 1907
- Place of birth: Merthyr, Wales
- Date of death: 1968
- Height: 5 ft 5 1/2 in (1.66 m)
- Position: Inside forward

Youth career
- 19??–19??: Carfartha Stars

Senior career*
Years	Team	Apps	(Gls)
19??–19??	Merthyr Town		
1926–1932	Bristol City	103	(26)
1932–1937	Sheffield United	113	(16)

International career
1930	Wales	1	(0)
- * Club domestic league appearances and goals

Albert Williams (4 March 1907 – 1968) was a Welsh footballer who played as an inside forward. He made over 210 Football League appearances in the years before the Second World War.

== Career ==
Bertie Williams was born in Merthyr, and played for Merthyr Town. Alex Raisbeck signed Bertie Williams in August 1926 for Bristol City. He made his debut in the Second Division at inside right in a 3-1 win at South Shields on 24 December 1927. Williams made 14apps scoring 4gls in 1927-28. Bertie Williams made a single appearance for Wales v Northern Ireland in February 1930. Bertie Williams joined Sheffield United for £1,400 in January 1932.

== Honours ==
Sheffield United

- FA Cup runner-up: 1935–36
