= Jimmy Rogers (footballer) =

English footballer

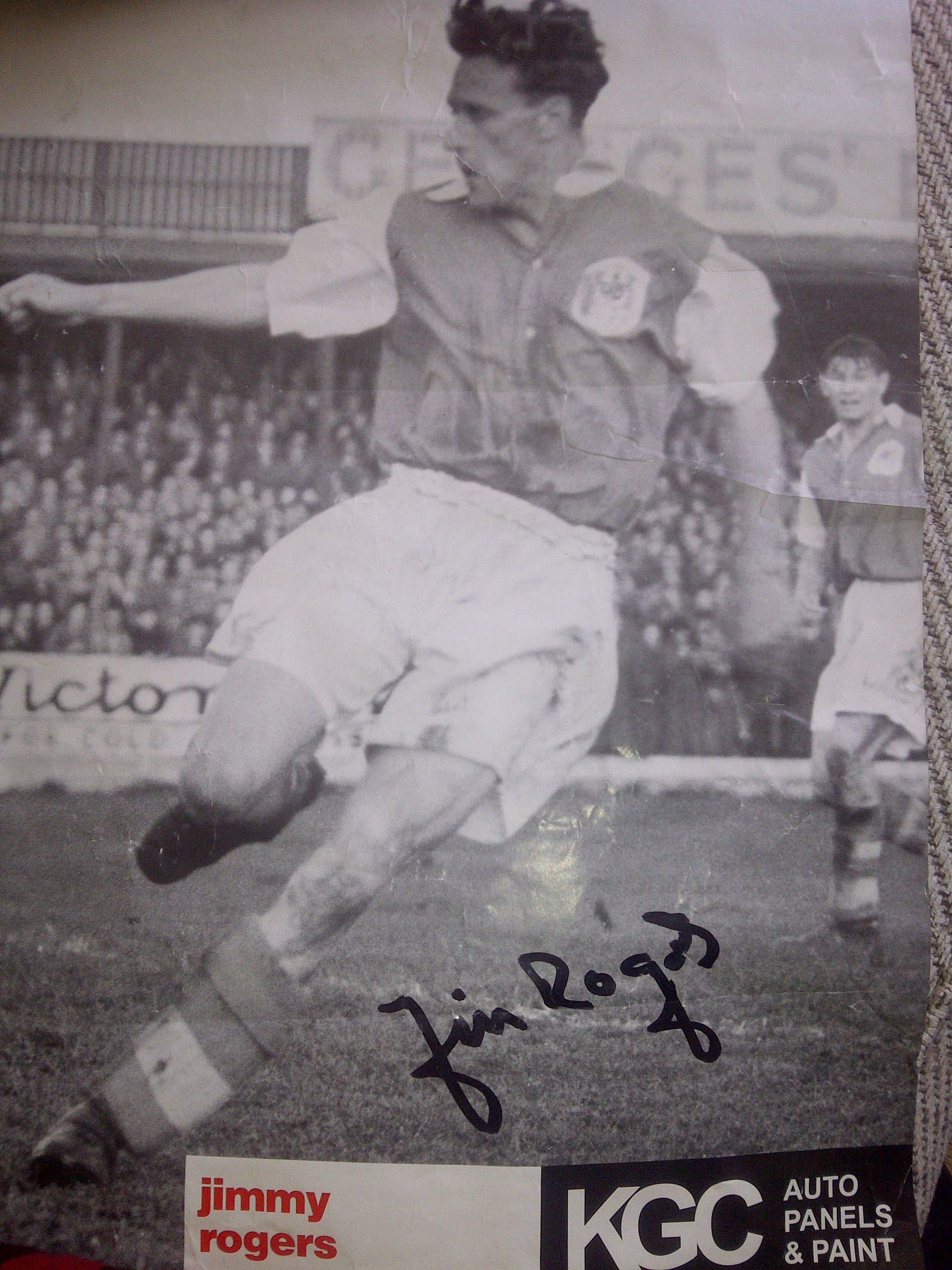

Personal information
- Full name: James Richard Rogers
- Date of birth: 31 December 1929
- Place of birth: Wednesbury, England
- Date of death: December 1996 (age 66/67)
- Place of death: North Somerset, England
- Positions: Outside right; centre forward

Youth career
- Rubery Owen

Senior career*
Years	Team	Apps	(Gls)
1948–1950	Wolverhampton Wanderers	0	(0)
1950–1956	Bristol City	155	(74)
1956–1958	Coventry City	77	(27)
1958–1962	Bristol City	115	(28)
1962–196?	Cinderford Town		

Managerial career
- 1962–196?: Cinderford Town (player-manager)
- * Club domestic league appearances and goals

James Richard Rogers (31 December 1929 – December 1996) was an English footballer who played as an outside right and centre forward. He made over 340 Football League appearances in the years after the Second World War.

== Career ==
Jimmy Rogers was a livewire opportunist who delighted in telling the world that he was lethal in front of goal – from six inches! Rogers was equally effective on the wing or at centre forward. In particular he had an instinct for rebounds that verged on the uncanny. The description "poacher" could have been coined for Rogers. Rogers had fine ball control and bags of determination, he was also firmly of the "if they kick me then I'll kick them back" persuasion and few defenders were able to intimidate him. In summary Jimmy Rogers was a humorous and intelligent person.

Jimmy Rogers played locally for Rubery Owen in the Midlands and represented the Combined Services. Rogers joined Wolverhampton Wanderers from Rubery Owen in May 1948. Bob Wright signed Rogers on a free transfer in May 1950 from Wolverhampton Wanderers for Bristol City. Jimmy Rogers made his debut at centre forward for Bristol City in the Third Division South in a 1–4 defeat at Torquay United on 18 November 1950. Rogers made only 8 appearances scoring 2 goals as Bristol City finished 10th in 1950–51. In the following season 1951–52 Rogers first appeared on the right wing in October. He returned to the team at outside left on Christmas Day with Bristol City in 20th place and promptly scored in 3 of the next 4 matches. This gave him a fairly regular place in the team firstly on the left wing and then at inside right. Bristol City ended the season in 15th place with Rogers making 22 appearances scoring 10 goals. Jimmy Rogers played intermittently and made 18 appearances scoring 4 goals in 1952–53 as the "Robins" rose to 5th place in the table. Rogers had two spells in the team on the right wing in 1953–54 making 13 appearances scoring 3 goals with City rising again to 3rd place in the Third Division South. When Bristol City won the Third Division South championship by 9 clear points in 1954–55, Jimmy Rogers laid claim to a regular place at outside right until January and then at centre forward when Arnold Rodgers suffered an achilles tendon injury. In season 1954–55 Rogers made 44 appearances scoring 25 goals including 15 goals in his 18 appearances at centre forward. Jimmy Rogers was the regular centre forward for Bristol City in their first season back in the Second Division in 1955–56 making 34 appearances scoring 25 goals including a hat trick in the 6–0 win v Plymouth Argyle on 27 December 1955. Rogers scored 5goals from 16 appearances at centre forward in 1956–57 for Bristol City prior to his transfer to Coventry City. Jimmy Rogers and Jack Boxley moved on to Coventry City in December 1956. Peter Doherty re-signed Rogers back from Coventry City for £3,000 in December 1958. Coventry City finished runners up in the newly created Fourth Division in season 1958–59. In 1958–59 Rogers made 9 appearances without scoring as he shared outside left duties with Johnny Watkins. Bristol City were relegated when finishing 22nd and bottom of the Second Division in 1959–60 when Jimmy Rogers made 31 appearances scoring 16 goals mainly from the right wing; Atyeo also scored 16 goals in this season but from 42 appearances. Jimmy Rogers played regularly at outside right in 1960–61 making 37 appearances scoring 8 goals. Bristol City rose back to 6th place in 1961–62 with Jimmy Rogers making 38 appearances mainly at outside right scoring 4 goals in his final season with the "Robins". Rogers moved on to become player manager at Cinderford Town in July 1962.

On retiring from football Jimmy Rogers set up his own business First Bristol Finance. He suffered a heart attack in 1976 but went on to set up another business KGC Panels. He was chairman of trustees of Westbury on Trym Wildlife Park in Bristol at the time of his death in December 1996.

== Honours ==
with Bristol City

- Football League Third Division South winner: 1954–55
