= Jack Bailey (footballer, born 1921) =

English footballer

Personal information
- Full name: Ernest John Bailey
- Date of birth: 17 June 1921
- Place of birth: Bristol, England
- Date of death: 31 December 1986 (aged 65)
- Place of death: Bristol, England
- Position: Left back

Youth career
- BAC, Bristol

Senior career*
| Years | Team | Apps | (Gls) |
| 1944–1958 | Bristol City | 348 | (0) |
| 1958–19?? | Trowbridge Town | | |
- * Club domestic league appearances and goals

Ernest John Bailey (17 June 1921 – 31 December 1986) was an English footballer who played as a left back. He made over 340 Football League appearances in the years after the Second World War.

== Career ==
Jack Bailey played locally for BAC, Bristol Aeroplane Company, in Bristol. Bob Hewison signed Bailey in December 1944 from BAC for Bristol City.

== Honours ==
with Bristol City

- Football League Third Division South winner: 1954–55
