= Leo Loftus =

English footballer

Personal information
- Full name: Joseph Leo Loftus
- Date of birth: 24 January 1906
- Place of birth: Ferryhill, England
- Date of death: 23 October 1992 (aged 86)
- Place of death: Durham Central, England
- Height: 5 ft 9 in (1.75 m)
- Position: Inside left

Youth career
- Chilton Lane United, Cornforth United

Senior career*
Years	Team	Apps	(Gls)
- Bishop Auckland
19??–1925	Willington		
1925–1926	Stockport County		
1926–1929	South Shields	30	(6)
1929–1932	Nottingham Forest	54	(14)
1932–1935	Bristol City	93	(29)
1935–1935	Gillingham	2	(0)
1935–1936	Burton Town	??	(31)
1936–1937	Barrow	27	(9)
- * Club domestic league appearances and goals

Joseph Leo Loftus (24 January 1906 – 23 October 1992) was an English footballer who played as an inside left. He made over 200 Football League appearances in the years before the Second World War.

== Career ==
Loftus played locally for Chilton Lane United and Cornforth United before joining Bishop Auckland. Loftus moved to Willington and played as an amateur for Stockport County. Loftus joined South Shields in July 1926. He moved on to Nottingham Forest in 1929. Bob Hewison signed Loftus for £100 in June 1932 for Bristol City. Loftus moved to Gillingham in August 1935. Loftus briefly dropped into non league football with Burton Town in October 1935 where he scored 31 goals in 1935–36. Loftus returned to League football joining Barrow in June 1936. In 1936–37 he made 27 appearances scoring 9 goals with 8 goals coming in an 18-match spell from January onwards after an indifferent start to the campaign.
