= Ivor Guy =

English footballer (1924–1986)

Personal information
- Date of birth: 27 February 1924
- Place of birth: Bristol, England
- Date of death: 9 January 1986 (aged 59)
- Place of death: Bristol, England
- Position: Right back

Youth career
- Hambrook Villa

Senior career*
Years	Team	Apps	(Gls)
1944–1957	Bristol City	404	(2)
1957–19??	Bath City		
- * Club domestic league appearances and goals

Ivor Guy (27 February 1924, in Chipping Sodbury – 1 September 1986, in Bristol) was an English footballer who played as a right back. He made over 400 Football League appearances in the years after the Second World War.

== Career ==
Ivor Guy born in Chipping Sodbury played locally for Hambrook Villa. Bob Hewison signed Guy in August 1944 from Hambrook Villa for Bristol City.

== Honours ==
with Bristol City

- Football League Third Division South winner: 1954–55
