= Dick Armstrong (footballer) =

English footballer

Personal information
- Full name: Richard Johnstone Armstrong
- Date of birth: 31 August 1909
- Place of birth: Scotswood, England
- Date of death: 10 March 1969 (aged 59)
- Place of death: Nottingham, England
- Height: 5 ft 11 in (1.80 m)
- Position: Inside right

Senior career*
| Years | Team | Apps | (Gls) |
- Easington Colliery
| 19??–1930 | Willington | | |
| 1930–1935 | Nottingham Forest | 17 | (0) |
| 1935–1944 | Bristol City | 115 | (19) |
- * Club domestic league appearances and goals

Richard Johnstone Armstrong (31 August 1909 – 10 March 1969) was an English footballer who played as an inside right. He made over 130 Football League appearances in the years before the Second World War.

== Career ==
Dick Armstrong played locally for Easington Colliery and Willington. Armstrong joined Nottingham Forest in January 1930 as understudy to long serving right half Billy McKinlay. Armstrong starred as Forest reserves finished runners up in the Central Combination in 1934–35. Bob Hewison signed Armstrong in May 1935 for Bristol City. Armstrong made his debut at right half in the opening game of 1935–36 in a 2–0 win at Watford on 31 August 1935. Armstrong played mainly in the inside right position in 1935–36 making 36 appearances scoring 11 goals including 2 goals in a 5–0 win v Swindon Town on 8 February 1936. Bob Caldwell a close season signing from Doncaster Rovers began as inside right in the following season but Armstrong returned to the side by October and made 21 appearances scoring 5 goals. Armstrong played at left half for the latter half of 1937–38 making 23 appearances without scoring as Bristol City finished runners up in Third Division South. Armstrong was the regular left half making 32 appearances scoring 2 goals in 1938–39. He made 3 appearances scoring 1 goal in 1939–40, the League season truncated due to the war, but scored 9 goals in 14 appearances in the replacement Regional League.
