= Mike Gibson (footballer) =

English footballer (born 1939)

Personal information
- Full name: Michael James Gibson
- Date of birth: 15 July 1939 (age 87)
- Place of birth: Derby, England
- Position: Goalkeeper

Youth career
- Gresley Rovers

Senior career*
Years	Team	Apps	(Gls)
1954–1958	Nuneaton Borough		
1960–1963	Shrewsbury Town	76	(0)
1963–1972	Bristol City	331	(0)
1972–1974	Gillingham	80	(0)

International career
1956	England Youth	1	(0)
- * Club domestic league appearances and goals

Michael James Gibson (born 15 July 1939) is an English former professional footballer. He played for Shrewsbury Town, Bristol City and Gillingham between 1960 and 1974 making over 480 Football League appearances in the years since the Second World War.

== Career ==
Mike Gibson played for the England Youth. Sammy Crooks the former England player signed Gibson for Gresley Rovers. The development of his career owes much to Crooks who recommended Gibson to his former teammate Angus Morrison at Nuneaton Borough. Mike Gibson left Nuneaton Borough to join Shrewsbury Town in March 1960 helping them to reach the League Cup semi finals in 1960–61. Fred Ford signed Gibson from Shrewsbury Town for £6,000 for Bristol City in April 1963. Mike Gibson helped Bristol City reach the League Cup semi finals in 1970–71. Mike Gibson moved to Gillingham in July 1972 and starred in their promotion success in 1973–74.

A shoulder injury ended Mike Gibson's playing career after which he returned to Bristol as a postman. He has assisted Bristol City as goalkeeping coach at Ashton Gate for many years.
