= Alan Williams (footballer, born 1938) =

English footballer

Personal information
- Full name: Alan Williams
- Date of birth: 3 June 1938
- Place of birth: Bristol, England
- Date of death: 18 May 2017 (aged 78)
- Place of death: Bristol, England
- Position: Centre half

Senior career*
Years	Team	Apps	(Gls)
1955–1961	Bristol City	134	(2)
1961–1965	Oldham Athletic	172	(9)
1965–1966	Watford	43	(4)
1966–1968	Newport County	64	(3)
1968–1972	Swansea Town	145	(7)
1972–1973	Cheltenham Town		
1973–1974	Gloucester City		
- Keynsham Town
Total		558	(25)
- * Club domestic league appearances and goals

Alan Williams (3 June 1938 – 18 May 2017) was an English footballer who made more than 550 appearances in the Football League playing as a centre half for Bristol City, Oldham Athletic, Watford, Newport County and Swansea Town. He also played non-league football for Cheltenham Town, Gloucester City and Keynsham Town.

After retiring from football, he ran the White Horse pub in Bedminster, Bristol for many years. He died in 2017 after six years with dementia, which may have been partly due to heading heavy leather balls during his footballing career (see chronic traumatic encephalopathy).

His son Gary also played League football.
