= Ernie Brinton =

English footballer

Personal information
- Full name: Ernest James Brinton
- Date of birth: 26 May 1908
- Place of birth: Bristol, England
- Date of death: 17 September 1981
- Place of death: Bristol, England
- Height: 5 ft 6 in (1.68 m)
- Position: Half back

Youth career
- Avonmouth Town

Senior career*
Years	Team	Apps	(Gls)
1929–1937	Bristol City	249	(7)
1937–1946	Newport County	78	(3)
1946–19??	Aldershot	12	(0)
- Street

Managerial career
- Ilfracombe Town (player/manager)
- * Club domestic league appearances and goals

Ernest James Brinton (26 May 1908 – 17 September 1981) was an English footballer who played as a half back. He made over 330 Football League appearances in the years before and after the Second World War.

== Career ==
Brinton played for Bristol City.

== Honours ==
with Newport County

- Football League Third Division South winner: 1938–39
