= Tony Ford (footballer, born 1944) =

English footballer and manager

Personal information
- Date of birth: 26 November 1944 (age 81)
- Place of birth: Thornbury, England
- Position: Right back

Youth career
- Bristol City

Senior career*
Years	Team	Apps	(Gls)
1961–1969	Bristol City	171	(10)
1969–1971	Bristol Rovers	28	(1)

Managerial career
- 1978: Hereford United
- 1981: Heart of Midlothian
- * Club domestic league appearances and goals

Tony Ford (born 26 November 1944) is an English former football player and manager. As a player, he appeared in the Football League for both of Bristol's professional clubs during a career curtailed by injury. As manager, he took brief charge of Third Division club Hereford United and Heart of Midlothian of the Scottish Premier Division.

== Career ==
Ford started his professional career with Bristol City in 1961, having joined the club as an apprentice. Predominantly a right back he made 171 league appearances for the first team and scored 10 goals. He moved across the River Avon to Bristol Rovers in 1969, for a fee of £4,000, and was appointed captain, but was forced to retire because of injury in 1971, having appeared only 28 times in the league for Rovers. He was awarded a benefit match in July of that year, a game between the two Bristol teams which Rovers won 3–1 at Ashton Gate.

He subsequently moved into coaching, his first appointment being with Plymouth Argyle. In 1973, Ford moved to Hereford United as assistant to former Bristol City coach John Sillett, newly appointed as manager, whom Ford knew from his playing days. Sillett left Edgar Street in 1978 and Ford was appointed caretaker manager. Unable to stop their relegation, he was not offered the position permanently.

Ford's next port of call was Heart of Midlothian, where he became Bobby Moncur's assistant. Moncur resigned in 1981 when Wallace Mercer gained executive control of the Edinburgh side and Ford was appointed manager when Mercer failed to convince either Jock Wallace, then at Leicester City, or Dundee United's Jim McLean to move to Tynecastle. Again though Ford's managerial tenure was to be brief and he was dismissed in December 1981, his five months in charge including defeats to minnows such as East Stirlingshire.

Ford's son Mike played in the Football League for Cardiff City and Oxford United. He has two other children, Daren and Louise (twins), and 8 grandchildren. Oliver, of whom has had a successful junior golf and football career however has gone on to become a pilot. Daren had a good football career in the non-league and then went on to a career within the construction industry.
