= Johnny Watkins =

English footballer

Personal information
- Full name: John Vincent Watkins
- Date of birth: 9 April 1933
- Place of birth: Bristol, England
- Position: Outside left

Youth career
- Portway School, Bristol Boys
- Coombe Dingle Boys Club
- 19??–1951: Clifton St Vincents

Senior career*
Years	Team	Apps	(Gls)
1951–1959	Bristol City	95	(19)
1959–1961	Cardiff City	65	(17)
1961–1962	Bristol Rovers	23	(0)
1962–196?	Chippenham Town		
196?–196?	Bath City		
196?–196?	Welton Rovers		

International career
1951–195?	England Youth	4	
- * Club domestic league appearances and goals

John Vincent "Johnny" Watkins (born 9 April 1933) was an English footballer who played as an outside left. He made over 180 Football League appearances in the years after the Second World War.

== Career ==
Johnny Watkins played locally for Portway School, Bristol Boys and Coombe Dingle Boys Club in Bristol. He then joined Clifton St Vincents in the Downs League in Bristol. Pat Beasley signed Johnny Watkins in June 1951 for Bristol City. He won four England Youth caps with Bristol City. Johnny Watkins made his debut for Bristol City at outside left in the 3–1 win v Norwich City on 30 September 1953. Watkins made only 2 appearances in the Third Division South in 1953–54. Watkins failed to make the first team in 1954–55 when Bristol City finished champions of Third Division South. Watkins had no opportunity in the following season 1955–56 either as Bristol played in the Second Division once again. Watkins returned to the outside left position scoring in a 1–2 defeat v Stoke City on 24 November 1956 and made 23 appearances scoring 5 goals including 2 penalties in 1956–57. As the "Robins" slipped down the Second Division table in 1957–58 Watkins established a regular spot on the left wing making 40 appearances scoring 9 goals including 5 penalties. Twice Watkins scored 2 goals in a match in a 4–0 win v Lincoln City and in a 5–0 win v Barnsley as City pulled clear of relegation in the last two months of the season. In the FA Cup 5th round Watkins headed City into the lead against Bristol Rovers but then missed a penalty as City lost 3–4 to their local rivals. In 1958–59 Watkins was again the regular outside left making 30 appearances scoring 5 goals although no longer taking penalties. Watkins was sold by Peter Doherty to Cardiff City in June 1959 for £2,500 and helped Cardiff City to promotion as runners up in the Second Division. In February 1961 Watkins moved from Cardiff City to Bristol Rovers in a swap deal for Dai Ward. Watkins played under manager Cyril Williams, the former Bristol City player, in July 1962 when he joined Chippenham Town in the Western League. Watkins later played under another manager Arnold Rodgers who was also a former Bristol City player at both Bath City and Welton Rovers.

After his playing career Johnny Watkins worked as a clerk for Harry Dolman's firm then for 20 years at Rolls-Royce until 1991 when he joined Strachan Henshaw; all local engineering firms in Bristol. Watkins also managed local Bristol football side Shirehampton, was a fine cricketer with Stoke Bishop CC and a bowls player with National Smelting Club in Bristol.

As a player Watkins had a reputation as having a cannonball shot which was enhanced on 27 March 1959 when his shot broke the net at Ashton Gate v Ipswich Town.

John is married to the lovely Rita and has two children, Debbie and Paul.

== Honours ==
with Cardiff City

- Football League Second Division runner up: 1959–60
