= Bert Neesam =

English footballer

Personal information
- Full name: Herbert Neesam
- Date of birth: 2 June 1892
- Place of birth: Brompton, England
- Date of death: 6 July 1969 (aged 77)
- Height: 5 ft 7 in (1.70 m)
- Position: Right half

Youth career
- Brompton

Senior career*
| Years | Team | Apps | (Gls) |
- Grangetown Athletic
| 1913–1928 | Bristol City | 281 | (18) |
- Bath City
- * Club domestic league appearances and goals

Herbert Neesam (2 June 1892 – 6 July 1969) was an English professional footballer who played as a right half, making 281 appearances in the Football League for Bristol City in the years before and after the First World War.
