= Gerry Sharpe (footballer) =

English footballer (1946–2019)

Personal information
- Full name: Gerald Ralph Sharpe
- Date of birth: 17 March 1946
- Place of birth: Gloucester, England
- Date of death: 17 December 2019 (aged 73)
- Place of death: Virginia Beach, Virginia, U.S.
- Position: Winger

Youth career
- Bristol City

Senior career*
Years	Team	Apps	(Gls)
1964–1971	Bristol City	153	(48)

Managerial career
- 1982: Bristol City (caretaker)
- * Club domestic league appearances and goals

Gerald Ralph Sharpe (17 March 1946 – 17 December 2019) was an English professional football player and coach who played as a winger.

== Career ==
Born in Gloucester, Sharpe played for Bristol City, as a winger/inside-forward renowned for his skill and exceptional pace. A series of impressive performances for Bristol City attracted interest in Sharpe from some of the leading clubs in England. With his potential seemingly about to be realised, it all came to an end on 16 January 1971 when he suffered a career-ending broken leg during a match with Middlesbrough at Ashton Gate.

With his playing career over, Sharpe took on a role coaching Bristol City's youth team and in 1982 enjoyed a brief spell as the club's caretaker manager, taking over following the dismissal of future England manager Roy Hodgson.

A move to the USA followed where he had coaching roles at teams including Jersey Shore Boca and Chesapeake United. In 2014, he was appointed Director of Recreation and Academy Programs for Norfolk United based in Norfolk, Virginia.

He died on 17 December 2019.
