= Terry Bush =

English footballer (1943–2018)

Personal information
- Full name: Terry Bush
- Date of birth: 29 January 1943
- Date of death: 30 July 2018 (aged 75)

Senior career*
| Years | Team | Apps | (Gls) |
| | Bristol City | 162 | (43) |
- * Club domestic league appearances and goals

Terry Bush (29 January 1943 – 30 July 2018) was an English professional footballer who played as a forward for Bristol City for his entire career before retiring due to injury in 1970. He played 182 games and scored 45 goals in all competitions, of which 43 goals came from 162 games in the Football League. After retiring he joined the club's staff as assistant secretary before becoming a full-time official for the Transport and General Workers Union.
