= Bobby Etheridge =

English footballer

Personal information
- Full name: Robert James Etheridge
- Date of birth: 21 March 1934
- Place of birth: Gloucester, England
- Date of death: 4 April 1988 (aged 54)
- Place of death: Gloucester, England
- Position: Wing half

Senior career*
Years	Team	Apps	(Gls)
195?–1956	Gloucester City		
1956–1964	Bristol City	259	(42)
1964–19??	Cheltenham Town		

Managerial career
- 1966–1973: Cheltenham Town (player manager)
- 1973–1976: Gloucester City
- 1985: Gloucester City
- * Club domestic league appearances and goals

Robert James Etheridge (25 March 1934 – 4 March 1988) was an English footballer who played for Gloucester City, Bristol City and Cheltenham Town. A wing half, Etheridge made over 250 Football League appearances.

== Career ==
Etheridge started his career at Gloucester City where he was the leading scorer in the 1954–55 season and helped Gloucester City to the Southern League Cup success in 1955–56. Pat Beasley signed Etheridge for Bristol City in September 1956 where he played 288 games and scored 47 goals In July 1965 he left Bristol City for Cheltenham Town as player manager.

In his later career in November 1973 he returned to Gloucester City as manager where he remained until 1976. He was also caretaker manager in 1985. He ended his managerial career with local Gloucester team, Longlevens.

He also played cricket as a wicketkeeper and batsman for Gloucestershire between 1954 and 1961. He was generally the understudy to Barrie Meyer who was the county first choice wicket keeper in this period. He played 33 matches for Gloucestershire scoring 796 runs with a batting average of 15.92; behind the stumps he achieved 33 catches and eight stumpings.
