= Don Clark (footballer) =

English footballer

Personal information
- Full name: Donald Clark
- Date of birth: 25 October 1917
- Place of birth: Bristol, England
- Date of death: 21 August 2014 (aged 96)
- Position: Centre forward

Senior career*
Years	Team	Apps	(Gls)
1938–1951	Bristol City	117	(67)
- * Club domestic league appearances and goals

Donald Clark (25 October 1917 – 21 August 2014) was an English professional footballer who played as a centre forward. Born in Bristol, Clark played in the Football League for hometown club Bristol City between 1938 and 1951, scoring 67 goals in 117 games. He is 12th in the list of top scorers for Bristol City had holds the club record for most goals scored in a season - 42 in 1946/47.

His son Brian was also a professional footballer.
