= Gordon Low =

Scottish footballer (1940–2023)

Personal information
- Full name: Gordon Alexander Low
- Date of birth: 11 July 1940
- Place of birth: Aberdeen, Scotland
- Date of death: 16 October 2023 (aged 83)
- Position(s): Centre-half

Senior career*
Years	Team	Apps	(Gls)
1957–1961	Huddersfield Town	67	(6)
1961–1968	Bristol City	205	(12)
1968–1970	Stockport County	64	(7)
1970–1971	Crewe Alexandra	5	(0)
- Selby Town
- *Club domestic league appearances and goals

Gordon Alexander Low (11 July 1940 – 16 October 2023) was a Scottish professional footballer who played as a centre-half for Huddersfield Town, Bristol City, Stockport County, Crewe Alexandra and Selby Town.

Low died on 16 October 2023, at the age of 83.
