= Jantzen Derrick =

English footballer (born 1943)

Personal information
- Full name: Jantzen Stuart Derrick
- Date of birth: 10 January 1943 (age 83)
- Place of birth: Bristol, England
- Height: 5 ft 11 in (1.80 m)
- Positions: Forward; winger

Senior career*
Years	Team	Apps	(Gls)
1959–1971	Bristol City	259	(31)
1970–1971	→ Mansfield Town (loan)		
1971–1972	Paris Saint-Germain	3	(0)
1972–1975	Bath City		
Total		262+	(31+)
- * Club domestic league appearances and goals

Jantzen Stuart Derrick (born 10 January 1943) is an English former professional footballer who played as a forward and winger.

== Career ==
Derrick started his career with Bristol City, playing 259 matches and scoring 31 goals. He spent the 1970–71 season on loan to Mansfield Town. In 1971, Derrick joined Paris Saint-Germain; he went on to play three matches for them before heading to Bath City, where he put an end to his career in 1975.

== Personal life ==
Derrick was born in Bristol on 10 January 1943.

Later in his life, he worked as a van vendor in Bristol.
