= Fred Ford (footballer) =

English footballer and manager

Personal information
- Full name: Frederick George Luther Ford
- Date of birth: 10 February 1916
- Place of birth: Dartford, England
- Date of death: 16 October 1981 (aged 65)
- Place of death: Kidlington, England
- Height: 6 ft 0 in (1.83 m)
- Position: Wing half

Senior career*
Years	Team	Apps	(Gls)
- Erith & Belvedere
- Charlton Athletic
1946–1947	Millwall	9	(0)
1947–1948	Carlisle United	28	(0)

Managerial career
- 1960–1967: Bristol City
- 1968–1969: Bristol Rovers
- 1969–1971: Swindon Town
- * Club domestic league appearances and goals

Frederick George Luther Ford (10 February 1916 – 16 October 1981) was an English footballer and manager.

== Honours ==
Manager

Swindon Town

- Anglo-Italian League Cup: 1969
- Anglo-Italian Cup: 1970
