= Alec Briggs =

English footballer

Alec Briggs (born 21 June 1939) is an English former professional footballer born in Sheffield who played for Bristol City between 1957 and 1970. He made 351 appearances in the Football League, scoring once.
