= Pat Beasley =

English footballer and manager

Personal information
- Full name: Albert Beasley
- Date of birth: 16 July 1913
- Place of birth: Stourbridge, England
- Date of death: 27 February 1986 (aged 72)
- Place of death: Taunton, England
- Positions: Outside forward; wing half

Youth career
- Cookley
- Stourbridge

Senior career*
Years	Team	Apps	(Gls)
1931–1937	Arsenal	79	(19)
1937–1939	Huddersfield Town	108	(24)
1946–1950	Fulham	153	(13)
1950–1952	Bristol City	66	(5)
Total		406	(61)

International career
1939	England	1	(1)

Managerial career
- 1950–1958: Bristol City
- 1959–1960: Birmingham City
- 1961–1964: Dover
- * Club domestic league appearances and goals

Albert "Pat" Beasley (16 July 1913 – 27 February 1986) was an England international footballer who made more than 400 appearances in the Football League. He also became a manager.

== Football career ==
Born in Stourbridge, Worcestershire, Beasley began his career as a winger playing for local sides in Kidderminster, before joining Stourbridge. In 1931, while still only seventeen he was signed for £550 by Arsenal. Initially in the youth and reserve teams, he made his first-team debut away to Sunderland on 6 April 1932, but only played sporadically at first, with regulars Joe Hulme and Cliff Bastin keeping the young Beasley out of the side.

An injury to Hulme in 1933–34 opened the door for Beasley, who scored ten goals in 23 league games as Arsenal won the First Division title, and he remained in the side for the 1934–35 season. However Beasley faced competition from both Hulme and new signing Alf Kirchen, and he missed the Gunners' 1936 FA Cup final win over Sheffield United. In October 1936 he was sold to Huddersfield Town for £750. In total he made 90 appearances for Arsenal, scoring 25 goals.

He spent three full seasons with Huddersfield Town, playing 108 league games, and reaching a second FA Cup final in 1938, which they lost to Preston North End. In 1939 he won his one and only England cap in a match against Scotland; he scored, and England won 2–1. He also won two unofficial caps during the Second World War, in which he also occasionally guested for his old side Arsenal.

He continued to play after hostilities ended; after helping Fulham win the 1948–49 Second Division title, he became Bristol City's player-manager in 1950. He was manager until 1958. He became joint manager of Birmingham City in early 1958, alongside Arthur Turner, and took sole charge later that year. He led the team to the final of the 1958–60 Inter-Cities Fairs Cup, which Birmingham lost to Barcelona over two legs, and then resigned his post. He later scouted for Fulham and managed Dover. He retired to live in Chard, Somerset, and died in Taunton at the age of 72.

== Honours ==
=== As player ===
Arsenal

- Football League First Division: 1933–34, 1934–35

Huddersfield Town

- FA Cup runner-up: 1937–38

Fulham

- Football League Second Division: 1948–49

=== As manager ===
Bristol City

- Football League Third Division South: 1954–55

Birmingham City

- Inter-Cities Fairs Cup runner-up: 1958–60
