= Peter Aitken =

Welsh footballer (born 1954)

Personal information
- Full name: Peter Gerald Aitken
- Date of birth: 30 June 1954 (age 72)
- Place of birth: Penarth, Wales
- Position: Central defender

Team information
- Current team: Bristol Rovers (community manager)

Youth career
- Bristol Rovers

Senior career*
Years	Team	Apps	(Gls)
1972–1980	Bristol Rovers	234	(3)
1980–1982	Bristol City	41	(1)
1982	York City	18	(2)
1982–1985	Bath City		
1982	AFC Bournemouth	1	(0)
1982–1983	Gloucester City	2	(0)
1985–198?	Trowbridge Town		
198?–1988	Forest Green Rovers		
1988	Bath City	9	(0)

International career
1975–1976	Wales U23	3	(0)
- * Club domestic league appearances and goals

Peter Gerald Aitken (born 30 June 1954) is a Welsh former footballer who played nearly 300 games in the Football League.

== Club career ==
Aitken began his career as an apprentice with Bristol Rovers, making his debut in the 1972–73 season. He joined local rivals Bristol City in 1980, and two years later, with the club in danger of folding, Aitken was one of the "Ashton Gate Eight", eight players who agreed to terminate their contracts to save the club. The others were David Rodgers, Geoff Merrick, Julian Marshall, Chris Garland, Jimmy Mann, Trevor Tainton, and Gerry Sweeney. While with Rovers he was the club captain, and after joining City he became the only player to captain both Bristol Clubs.

Aitken joined York City, playing 18 times before the end of the season. After a spell in Hong Kong (Bulova SA). in July 1982 he joined non-league Bath City, although also played once for AFC Bournemouth on non-contract terms the following season. He remained with Bath until June 1985 when he left to join Trowbridge Town. He later joined Forest Green Rovers before rejoining Bath City in February 1988, although was released at the end of the season.

He returned to Bath for a third time in the 1991 close season, as assistant manager under Tony Ricketts. However, he was released as part of a cost-cutting process before the end of the season. He was later assistant manager to Lindsay Parsons a Cheltenham Town and briefly appeared for them on one occasion. He then spent 2 years with Gillingham as a Youth Development Officer.

He later returned to Bristol Rovers to work in their Community Department, taking up the post of Community Manager in 2000, a post he held until October 2016.

== International career ==
Aitken made three appearances for the Wales national under-23 team from 1975 to 1976.
