= Jock Hamilton =

Scottish footballer

Personal information
- Full name: John Hamilton
- Date of birth: 31 July 1869
- Place of birth: Ayr, Scotland
- Date of death: 30 October 1931 (aged 62)
- Place of death: Keynsham, England
- Position: Centre half

Senior career*
Years	Team	Apps	(Gls)
18??–18??	Ayr F.C.		
1894–1895	Wolverhampton Wanderers	4	(0)
1895–1897	Loughborough	59	(2)
1897–1900	Bristol City	76	(2)
1900–1902	Leicester Fosse	28	(0)
1901–1902	Watford	32	(3)
1902–1903	Wellingborough		
1903–1904	Fulham	12	(0)

Managerial career
- 1904–1908: Fulham assistant trainer
- April–July 1907: Club Athletico Paulistano trainer
- 1908–1910: Fulham trainer
- 1910–1915: Bristol City reserve team trainer
- 1915–1919: Bristol City manager
- * Club domestic league appearances and goals

A. John "Jock" Hamilton (31 July 1869 in Ayr, Scotland – 30 October 1931 in Keynsham, England) was a Scottish footballer who played as a centre half. He made over 90 Football League appearances and over 120 Southern League appearances in the years before the First World War. He was also trainer at Fulham and manager at Bristol City.

== Career ==
Hamilton played locally for Ayr FC. He moved south to England to Wolverhampton Wanderers where he suffered a serious injury restricting his appearances. Hamilton joined Loughborough and was ever present in their inaugural Football League season. Hamilton had spells with Derby County and Ilkeston Town. Sam Hollis signed Hamilton in summer 1897 for Bristol City prior to their first season as a professional club in the Southern League Hamilton made his debut for Bristol City. While working for Fulham as assistant trainer, Hamilton was invited to Brazil to coach Club Athletico Paulistano. He visited São Paulo between April and July 1907 and this is apparently the first example of a Brazilian Club officially engaging the services of a trainer from Britain.

== Honours ==
with Bristol City

- Southern Football League runners up: 1897–98
- Southern Football League runners up: 1898–99
