= Frank Bacon (football manager) =

English footballer, manager, and director

Francis Noot Bacon (22 March 1862 – 25 January 1918) was a director of Bristol City. He was born and died in Bedminster, Bristol. He was installed as temporary manager between October 1910 & January 1911 after the dismissal of Harry Thickett. In January 1911 Sam Hollis took over for his third, and final, spell as manager.

Francis was also landlord of the Masonic Hotel in North Street, Bedminster from 1897 until his death in 1918.

Frank Bacon is the great-great-grandfather of footballer Mike Hooper.
