= Harry Dolman =

British businessman and football executive (1897–1977)

Henry James "Harry" Dolman OBE (6 August 1897– November 9, 1977) was a well-known Bristol businessman, starting off as an engineer who later bought out the firm he worked for, Brecknell, Dolman & Rogers Ltd. (formerly Brecknell, Munro & Rogers Ltd.). He later became chairman and president of Bristol City FC.

== Early life ==
Harry Dolman was born in Kington Langley near Chippenham, Wiltshire. His father was by trade a farmer and also landlord of a village pub.

He enlisted as a reservist in the Royal Wiltshire Yeomanry at the age of 16 in 1913 and was called up for active service in the First World War on the day before his 17th birthday. He served in France from 1915 to 1917 and was then selected for officer training, being commissioned as a second lieutenant in the Gloucestershire Regiment. He subsequently volunteered for the newly-formed Royal Air Force and commenced pilot training, but was transferred back to the Glosters in February 1919 and was demobilised in October. He briefly reenlisted as a reservist in the Yeomanry as a private.

== Brecknell, Dolman & Rogers Ltd. ==
Starting out as a 21-year-old junior draughtsman in the engineering firm within six years Dolman had become chief engineer and by 1929, managing director. The company's products ranged from egg grading machines to ticket and change issuing machines, many of them Dolman's own inventions. It was also credited with making turnstiles for the London Underground. At its height the business employed 1,600 people. The scope of its original purely mechanical machines was expanded considerably when in the 1960s BDR acquired the Brislington-based electronics company Redcliffe Electronics which was renamed Brecknell-Redcliffe Electronics and continued in the development of electronically actuated ticket and coin machines, obtaining a number of patents in this field.

The company was given the Queen's Award to Industry in 1968, for "technological innovation in food packaging machines". Dolman himself was made an OBE for his services to export in the 1970 New Year Honours.

The firm then known in 1969 as BDR Machines (or with affection in Bristol as Dolman's) was sold to the Vokes Group and in turn was taken over by Thomas Tilling in 1972. A year later in spite of protests by the employees and trade unions, the decision was taken by Tilling Group, to abandon the business altogether.

== Association with Bristol City F.C. ==
Dolman was a keen footballer from an early age. During his military service he turned out once for the prestigious Aldershot Command team.. After moving to Bristol in the 1920s he both played as an amateur and supplemented his earnings by refereeing. Living in the Eastville area, he was a regular attender at the nearby Eastville Stadium of Bristol Rovers, eventually becoming a season ticket holder. In the late 1930s he was invited to a Rovers board meeting but found he disagreed with the business decisions being taken, and was not invited to become a director. Former Rovers manager Albert Prince-Cox then suggested he meet Bristol City chairman George Jenkins, whose business outlook was closer to Dolman's, and he was subsequently appointed as a director of City in 1939.

In 1949, the sale of two promising young players led to a vote of no confidence in Jenkins and his resignation. Dolman agreed to take over as chairman for a year as fellow director Arthur Sperring also coveted the chairmanship, but Sperring died within the year and Dolman was to remain chairman of Bristol City until 1974. He took over a club that was languishing in the Third Division South, had no manager, and whose ground had suffered from wartime bombing.

His first task as chairman was to replace manager Bob Hewison, who had resigned in March 1949. After a failed attempt to attract Huddersfield Town and Northern Ireland forward Peter Doherty to be player-manager, Bob Wright was appointed. He also set about improving Ashton Gate where the pitch was relaid and safety works done to the covered end and other terraces. Compensation of £16,500 from the War Damage Commission for the bombing of the main stand was insufficient to meet the costs of rebuilding, and other sources of funds, including an executive supporters' club called the "51 Club" founded in 1951, had to be found. The new Grandstand (later the Williams Stand) opened in 1953.

Dolman designed the first set of floodlights installed at Ashton Gate in the early 1950s. Competitive football under the lights was not yet permitted but it did enable lucrative friendlies and City were able to attract top-class opposition including London giants Arsenal and Spurs, as well as Scottish and continental European sides..

In 1951, Dolman secured the services of highly-rated teenager John Atyeo from under the noses of league champions Portsmouth by allowing him to sign as a semi-professional while qualifying as a quantity surveyor, promising that he would remain the club's best-paid player and, on a handshake deal with Atyeo's father, that he wouldn't be transferred against his will. With Atyeo in the side, City were promoted to Division Two under Wright's successor Pat Beasley in 1955. In the higher league they struggled and after Beasley's dismissal, Dolman was finally able to appoint Doherty as manager. He was able to stave off relegation in 1958 but introduced changes that lost the confidence of the players and was sacked with relegation inevitable in March 1960. Bristol Rovers coach Fred Ford was appointed in his place, and led the team back to Division Two in 1965.

In the 1960s Dolman turned his mind to improving the ground further and was fundamental in the design and build of a new 5,000-seat stand on the undeveloped side of the ground opposite the Grandstand. The new building, which was named the Dolman Stand after him, opened in 1970 at the cost of £235,000. Eager to find revenue sources for the club, Dolman installed indoor bowling greens under the stand. The pitch was narrowed slightly to allow for a "schoolboys' enclosure" (later the Family Enclosure, now replaced with further raked seating) in front of the stand, but space for disabled fans to watch from their "invalid carriages" was lost.

Dolman's final managerial appointment was of Alan Dicks in 1967, who would finally lead City to the First Division in 1976. In 1974, having been deposed as chairman, he took on the presidency which he held until his death in 1977, aged 80. His wife, Marina, now holds this position.

== Personal life ==
After his brief service in the RAF, Dolman retained an interest in aviation and in 1935 built a Mignet "Flying Flea" aircraft in his garage. It was granted a permit to fly and registered as G-AEHM. Dolman made a few short flights from Bristol (Whitchurch) Airport and Hullavington in Wiltshire in 1936 but the plane proved difficult to control and he "broke a propeller every time". The type was subsequently banned after a number of fatal accidents. His aircraft is now part of the Science Museum Group's collection, and was displayed at the M Shed museum in Bristol from 2011.

Dolman married Doris Parnell on 2 September 1919. They had four children born between 1920 and 1929: Ron, Ray, Frances ("Frankie") and Hazel. The marriage broke down by about 1945, at which time another couple were divorced on the grounds of the wife's "misbehaviour" with Harry, and thereafter they lived separate lives in the same house in Staple Hill. Harry and Doris were finally divorced in April 1961, and in the same month 63-year-old Harry married his 24-year-old secretary Marina Crossley.. They settled at Chew Magna and remained married until his death in 1977. Marina Dolman subsequently became president of Bristol City and in the 2017 Birthday Honours was made an MBE for her services to football, whereas Harry's OBE had been for his business career.
