= Wales national football team =

Men's association football team representing Wales

Wales
- Nickname: The Dragons (Welsh: Y Dreigiau)
- Association: Football Association of Wales (FAW)
- Confederation: UEFA (Europe)
- Head coach: Craig Bellamy
- Captain: Ben Davies
- Most caps: Gareth Bale (111)
- Top scorer: Gareth Bale (41)
- Home stadium: Cardiff City Stadium
- FIFA code: WAL
First colours	Second colours

FIFA ranking
- Current: 41 ▼2 (18 November 2026)
- Highest: 8 (October 2015)
- Lowest: 117 (August 2011)

First international
- Scotland 4–0 Wales (Glasgow, Scotland; 25 March 1876)

Biggest win
- Wales 11–0 Ireland (Wrexham, Wales; 3 March 1888)

Biggest defeat
- Scotland 9–0 Wales (Glasgow, Scotland; 23 March 1878)

World Cup
- Appearances: 2 (first in 1958)
- Best result: Quarter-finals (1958)

European Championship
- Appearances: 2 (first in 2016)
- Best result: Semi-finals (2016)
Medal record
Men's football
European Championship
Bronze medal – third place	2016 France	Team
- Website: faw.cymru

The Wales national football team (Welsh: Tîm pêl-droed cenedlaethol Cymru) represents Wales in men's international football. It is controlled by the Football Association of Wales (FAW), the governing body for football in Wales. They have been a member of FIFA since 1946 and a member of UEFA since 1954.

Wales have qualified for the FIFA World Cup twice, in 1958 and 2022. In 1958, they reached the quarter-finals before losing to eventual champions Brazil. They then went 58 years before reaching their second major tournament, when – following a rise of 109 places from an all-time low of 117th to a peak of 8th in the FIFA World Ranking between August 2011 and October 2015 – they qualified for UEFA Euro 2016, where they reached the semi-finals before again losing to the eventual champions, Portugal. A second successive UEFA European Championship followed when Wales reached the round of 16 of UEFA Euro 2020. They also progressed through UEFA Euro 1976 qualifying to the quarter-finals, though this was played on a two-legged, home-and-away basis and is not considered part of the finals tournament.

Historically, the Welsh team has featured a number of players from Wales' top club teams, particularly Swansea City and Cardiff City. These two Welsh clubs play in the English league system alongside fellow Welsh clubs Wrexham, Newport County and Merthyr Town. However, most Welsh football clubs play in the Welsh football league system. As a country of the United Kingdom, Wales is not a member of the International Olympic Committee (as Welsh athletes compete for Great Britain) and therefore the national team does not compete in the Olympic Games.

== History ==
=== The early years ===
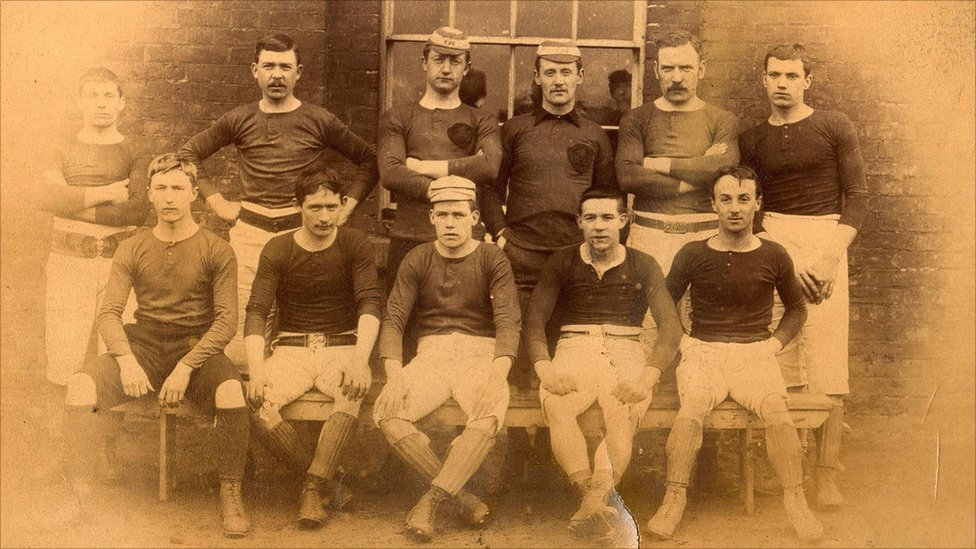
The Wales side of 1887–88

Wales played its first competitive match on 25 March 1876 against Scotland in Glasgow, making it the third-oldest international football team in the world. Although the Scots won the first fixture 4–0, a return match was planned in Wales the following year, and so it was that the first international football match on Welsh soil took place at the Racecourse Ground, Wrexham, on 5 March 1877. Scotland took the spoils winning 2–0. Wales' first match against England came in 1879, a 2–1 defeat at the Kennington Oval, London, and in 1882, Wales faced Ireland for the first time, winning 7–1 in Wrexham.

The associations of the four Home Nations met at the International Football Conference in Manchester on 6 December 1882 to set down a set of worldwide rules. This meeting saw the establishment of the International Football Association Board (IFAB) to approve changes to the rules, a task the four associations still perform to this day. The 1883–84 season saw the formation of the British Home Championship, a tournament which was played annually between England, Scotland, Ireland and Wales until 1983–84. Wales were champions on 12 occasions, winning outright seven times whilst sharing the title five times.

The FAW became members of FIFA, world football's governing body, in 1910, but the relationship between FIFA and the British associations was fraught and the British nations withdrew from FIFA in 1928 in a dispute over payments to amateur players. As a result, Wales did not enter the first three FIFA World Cups. In 1932, Wales played host to the Republic of Ireland, the first time they played against a side from outside the four home nations. One year later, Wales played a match outside the United Kingdom for the first time when they travelled to Paris to play France national football team in a match drawn 1–1. After World War II, Wales, along with the other three home nations, rejoined FIFA in 1946 and took part in the qualifying rounds for the 1950 World Cup, the 1949–50 Home Championships being designated as a qualifying group. The top two teams were to qualify for the finals in Brazil, but Wales finished bottom of the group.

=== 1958 World Cup ===
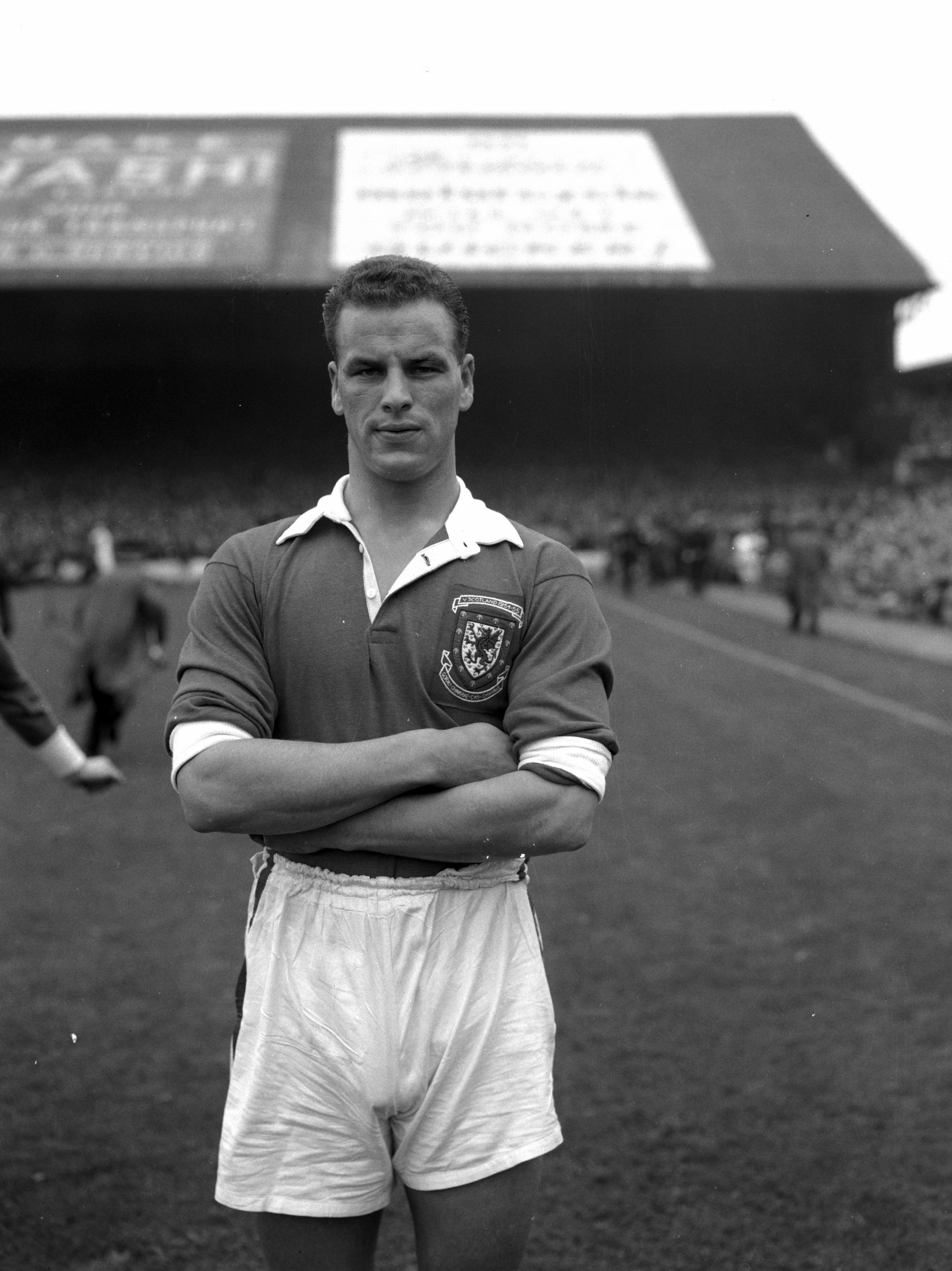
John Charles on international duty for Wales against Scotland, 1954

The 1950s were a golden age for Welsh football with stars such as Ivor Allchurch, Cliff Jones, Alf Sherwood, Jack Kelsey, Trevor Ford, Ronnie Burgess, Terry Medwin, Mel Charles and John Charles.

Wales made their first World Cup finals tournament appearance in the 1958 FIFA World Cup in Sweden. However, their path to qualification was unusual. Having finished second to Czechoslovakia in qualifying Group 4, the golden generation of Welsh football managed by Jimmy Murphy seemed to have missed out on qualification, but the politics of the Middle East subsequently intervened. In the Asian/African qualifying zone, Egypt and Sudan had refused to play against Israel following the Suez Crisis, while Indonesia had insisted on meeting Israel on neutral ground. As a result, FIFA proclaimed Israel winners of their group. However, FIFA did not want a team to qualify for the World Cup finals without actually playing a match, and so lots were drawn of all the second-placed teams in UEFA. Belgium were drawn out first but refused to participate, and so then Wales was drawn out and awarded a two-legged play-off match against Israel with a place in Sweden for the winners. Having defeated Israel 2–0 at the Ramat Gan Stadium and 2–0 at Ninian Park, Cardiff, Wales went through to a World Cup finals tournament for the first time.

The strong Welsh squad made their mark in Sweden, drawing all the matches in their group against Hungary, Mexico and Sweden before defeating Hungary in a play-off match to reach the quarter-finals against Brazil. However, Wales' chances of victory against Brazil were hampered by an injury to John Charles that ruled him out of the match. Wales lost 1–0 with 17-year-old Pelé scoring his first international goal. The goal made Pelé the youngest World Cup goal scorer and Brazil went on to win the tournament.

Wales' remarkable campaign in Sweden was the subject of the best-selling book When Pele Broke Our Hearts: Wales and the 1958 World Cup (by Mario Risoli, St David's Press) which was published on the 40th anniversary of the World Cup and was also the inspiration for a Bafta Cymru-nominated documentary.

=== 1970s ===
Wales failed to qualify for the first four finals tournaments of the UEFA European Championship from its inception in 1960. They also did not replicate their success in qualifying for the 1958 FIFA World Cup, although they did achieve a highly creditable draw against then world champions England in the 1970 British Home Championship, weeks before England went to defend their title in Mexico 1970 FIFA World Cup. This helped to give Wales a share of the Home Championship trophy for the year, goal difference not at that stage being used to determine an outright winner. In 1976, the team – managed by Mike Smith – reached the quarter-finals of the UEFA European Championship, having finished top of qualifying Group 2 ahead of Hungary, Austria and Luxembourg, but this was not considered part of the finals. Prior to 1980, only four countries qualified for the finals tournament, and Wales were drawn to play against the winners of Group 3 – Yugoslavia – in a two-legged, home-and-away tie. Wales lost the first leg 2–0 in Zagreb and were eliminated from the competition following a 1–1 draw in a bad-tempered return leg at Cardiff's Ninian Park, which was marred by crowd trouble. This initially led to Wales being banned from the 1980 tournament, but this was reduced on appeal to a four-year ban on qualifying matches being played within 100 miles of Cardiff. Yugoslavia went on to finish fourth in the 1976 tournament.

The following year, Wales defeated England on English soil for the first time in 42 years and secured their only victory to date at Wembley Stadium thanks to a Leighton James penalty. Wales went onto finish second in the 1977 British Home Championship. A few weeks earlier, Wales achieved another noted victory against then European Champions Czechoslovakia with Nick Deacy and James again scoring. This victory in a qualifier strengthened Wales' bid to qualify for the 1978 FIFA World Cup, but six months later, that attempt ended in controversial circumstances. The decisive fixture against Scotland - nominally a home fixture for Wales, although relocated to Anfield amidst security concerns - was swung by a contentious penalty awarded to Scotland, replays suggesting the handball offence may have actually been perpetrated by Scottish striker Joe Jordan. Another notable achievement for Wales however came in the 1980 British Home Championship, as Wales comprehensively defeated England at the Racecourse Ground. Goals from Mickey Thomas, Ian Walsh, Leighton James and an own goal by Phil Thompson saw Wales defeat England 4–1 just four days after England had defeated the then-world champions, Argentina.

=== 1980s ===
In the 1982 FIFA World Cup qualifiers, the Wales team – managed by Mike England – came extremely close to qualification; a 3–0 defeat against the Soviet Union in their final match meant they missed out on goal difference, but the real damage had been done by their failure to beat Iceland in their last home match, the match eventually finishing 2–2 after several hold-ups due to floodlight failures.

Wales also only narrowly missed out on qualification for the 1984 UEFA European Championship. They were seconds away from qualification when a winning goal by Ljubomir Radanović for Yugoslavia during injury time in the final game of qualifying group 4 against Bulgaria eliminated Wales.

Mark Hughes marked his debut for Wales by scoring the only goal of the match as England were defeated once again in 1984. The following season, Hughes was again on target, scoring a wonder goal as Wales thrashed Spain 3–0 at the Racecourse during qualification for the 1986 World Cup. However, despite defeating Scotland 1–0 at Hampden Park, it was again Iceland that wrecked Welsh hopes by defeating Wales 1–0 in Reykjavík, and for the second World Cup in a row, Wales missed out on goal difference. Wales had to win their last match at home to Scotland to be guaranteed at least a play-off, but were held to a 1–1 draw in a match marred by the death of Scotland manager Jock Stein, who collapsed from a heart attack at the end of the match.

Wales also started strongly in their bid to qualify for the 1988 UEFA European Championship, and were undefeated after four games. But away defeats against Denmark and Czechoslovakia in the last two games in qualifying group 6 saw Mike England's eight-year reign as Welsh coach end in another disappointment.

=== 1990s ===
Under coach Terry Yorath, Wales achieved a remarkable result on 5 June 1991 when defeating then world champions Germany in a Euro 1992 qualifier, thanks to a goal from Ian Rush. Three months later, on 11 September 1991, Wales achieved a notable double by defeating Brazil for the only time in a friendly international, thanks to a goal from Dean Saunders. At this point, Wales seemed well placed to progress from their qualifying group 5. However, victories for Germany in their three remaining matches in the group, including a 4–1 win in the return fixture against Wales, eliminated the Welsh.

Wales also made a strong showing in their qualifying group for the 1994 World Cup, achieving a noted victory at home to Belgium. Wales thus attained what was then their highest position in the FIFA World Rankings on 27 August 1993. Wales again came close to qualifying for a major championship only to fall short in the closing stages of their campaign. Needing to win the final match of the group at home to Romania on 17 November, Paul Bodin missed a penalty when the scores were level 1–1; the miss was immediately followed by Romania taking the lead and going on to win 2–1.

Following the failure to qualify, Yorath's contract as manager of the national side was not renewed by the FAW, and Real Sociedad manager John Toshack was appointed on a part-time basis. However, Toshack resigned after just one match (a 3–1 defeat to Norway) citing problems with the FAW as his reason for leaving, although he was sure to have been shocked at being booed off the pitch at Ninian Park by the Welsh fans still reeling from the dismissal of Yorath. Mike Smith took the manager role for the second time at the start of the Euro 1996 qualifiers, but Wales slipped to embarrassing defeats against Moldova and Georgia before Bobby Gould was appointed in June 1995.

Gould's time in charge of Wales is seen as a dark period by Welsh football fans. His questionable tactics and public fallings-out with players Nathan Blake, Robbie Savage and Mark Hughes, coupled with embarrassing defeats to club side Leyton Orient and a 7–1 thrashing by the Netherlands in 1996 did not make him a popular figure within Wales. Gould finally resigned following a 4–0 defeat to Italy in 1999, and the FAW turned to two legends of the national team, Neville Southall and Mark Hughes, to take temporary charge of the match against Denmark four days later, with Hughes later being appointed on a permanent basis.

=== 2000s ===
Under Mark Hughes, Wales came close to qualifying for a place at Euro 2004 in Portugal, being narrowly defeated by Russia in the play-offs. However, the defeat was not without its controversy, as Russian midfielder Yegor Titov tested positive for the use of a banned substance after the first qualifying leg, a scoreless draw in Moscow. Notwithstanding, FIFA opted not to take action against the Football Union of Russia other than instructing them not to field Titov again, and the Russian team went on to defeat Wales 1–0 in Cardiff to qualify for the final tournament.

Following a disappointing start to the 2006 World Cup qualifying campaign, Hughes left his role with the national team to take over as manager of Premier League outfit Blackburn Rovers. John Toshack was appointed manager for the second time in November 2004. In Euro 2008 qualifying, Wales finished 5th in Group D. In 2010 FIFA World Cup qualification – UEFA Group 4, two 2–0 home defeats by Finland and Germany in spring 2009 effectively ended Wales' hopes of qualification.

Wales were drawn in UEFA Euro 2012 qualifying Group G. After a defeat at Montenegro in their opening match, on 9 September 2010, John Toshack stood down as manager after being disappointed at previous results in 2010 against Croatia and the opening Euro 2012 qualifier. Wales under-21 coach Brian Flynn took over from Toshack as caretaker manager.

=== 2010s ===
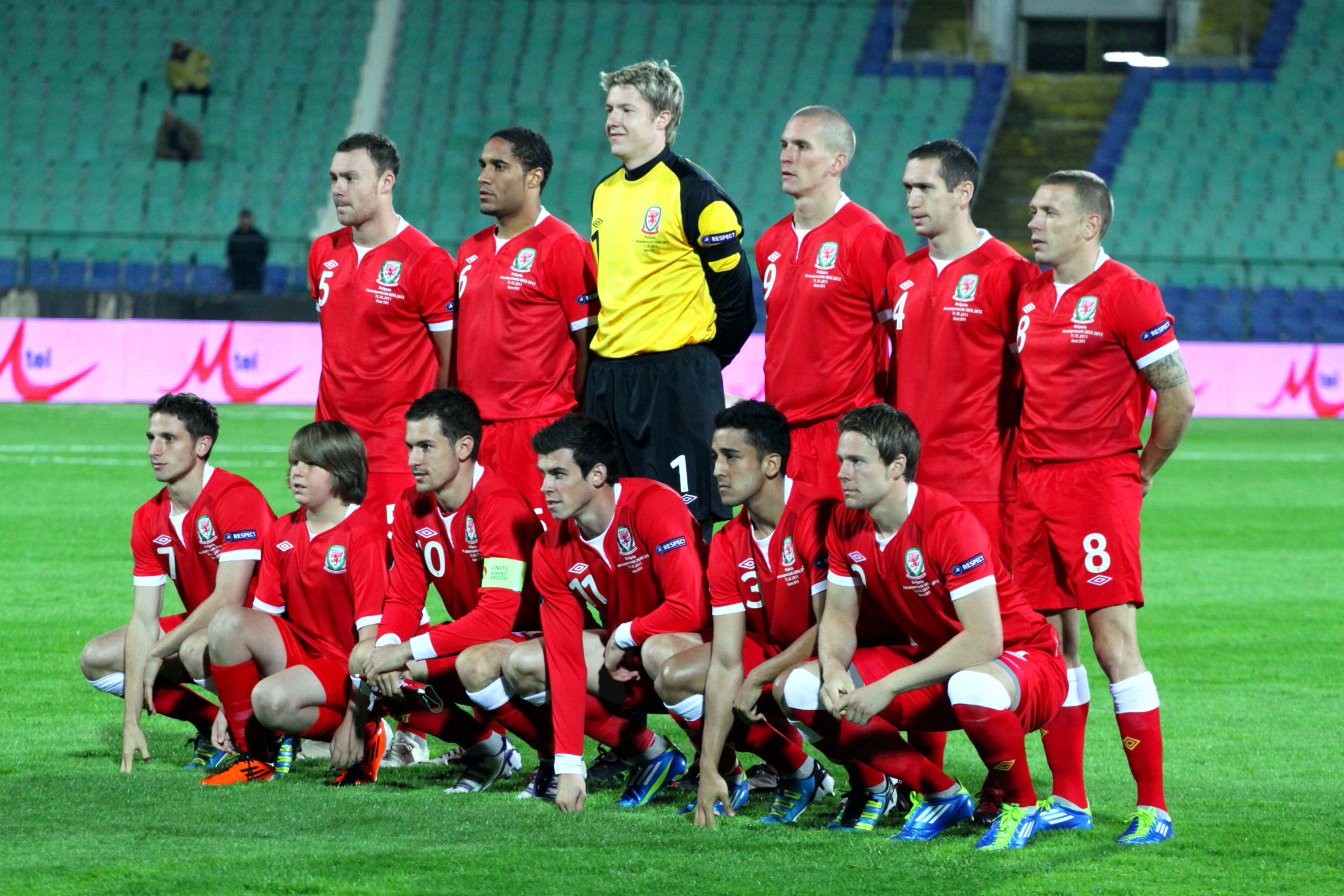
The Wales team on 11 October 2011 ahead of their UEFA Euro 2012 qualifying match against Bulgaria in Sofia

Gary Speed was appointed as permanent manager on 14 December 2010. Speed appointed 20-year-old Aaron Ramsey captain, making him the youngest Wales captain. In August 2011, Wales attained their lowest FIFA ranking of 117th. After some promising performances, in October 2011, Wales had rapidly risen to 45th in the FIFA rankings. A 4–1 home win in a friendly match against Norway on 12 November 2011 proved to be Speed's last match in charge of Wales. The match was a culmination of Speed's efforts which led Wales to receive the unofficial award for biggest mover of 2011 in the FIFA rankings. His tenure as manager ended in tragic circumstances two weeks later when he was found dead at his home on 27 November, having apparently committed suicide.

Due to London's successful bid for the 2012 Summer Olympics, a Great Britain team would qualify as of right of being the host nation. However, the FAW stressed it was strongly against the proposal. Despite this, Welsh players Aaron Ramsey and Gareth Bale expressed their interest in representing the Great Britain Olympic football team. Bale withdrew due to injury, but Ramsey was joined by four other Welshmen in Stuart Pearce's 18-man squad: Swansea City's Joe Allen and Neil Taylor, while Manchester United's Ryan Giggs and Liverpool's Craig Bellamy were included as over-age players, with Giggs being made captain.

Chris Coleman was appointed Wales team manager on 19 January 2012. For 2014 World Cup qualification, Wales were drawn in Group A but finished 5th. Wales were placed in Group B for qualifying for Euro 2016. In July 2015, following four wins and two draws, Wales topped the group.

In July 2015, having attained their then highest FIFA ranking of tenth, Wales were placed among the top seeds for the 2018 FIFA World Cup qualification draw. In September 2015, England dropped to tenth in the FIFA rankings, making Wales – in ninth position – the highest-ranked British team for the first time in its history. In October 2015, Wales attained their highest ever FIFA ranking of eighth. On 10 October 2015, Wales lost 2–0 to Bosnia and Herzegovina. However, Wales' qualification for Euro 2016 was confirmed after Cyprus defeated Israel that same evening.

==== Euro 2016 ====
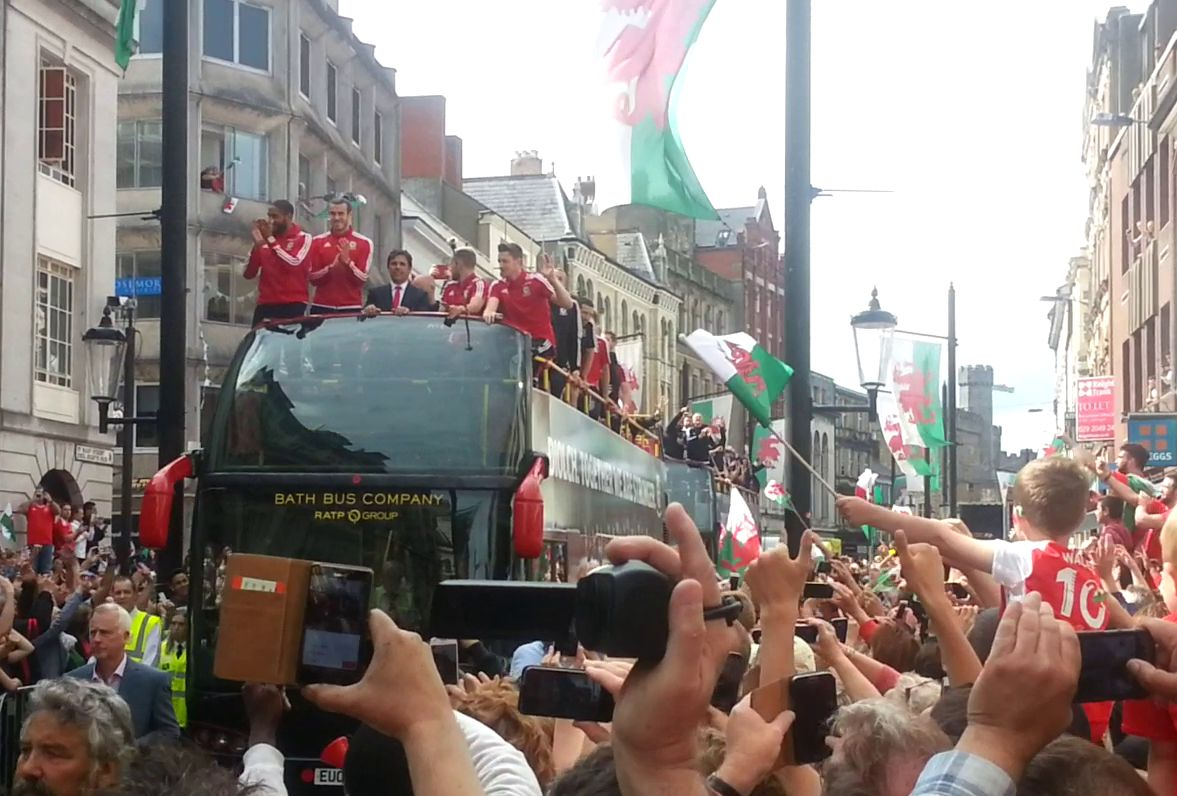
After reaching the Euro 2016 semi-finals, the Wales National Football Team return to Wales for an open-top bus parade through Cardiff city centre

Wales qualified for Euro 2016 in France, their first European Championship tournament, and were drawn into Group B with Slovakia, Russia and England. On their Euro debut, on 11 June against Slovakia at the Nouveau Stade de Bordeaux, Gareth Bale scored direct from a free-kick to give Wales a 1–0 lead, and Hal Robson-Kanu scored the winner in a 2–1 victory. In their second match, against England in Lens, Wales led 1–0 at half-time through another Bale free-kick, but lost 2–1. Against Russia at the Stadium Municipal in Toulouse, Aaron Ramsey, Neil Taylor and Bale scored in a 3–0 win that made them win the group.

In their round-of-16 match at the Parc des Princes in Paris, Wales played Northern Ireland and won 1–0 after an own goal from Gareth McAuley. In the quarter-final against Belgium, Wales went behind to a long-range effort from Radja Nainggolan, but captain Ashley Williams headed an equaliser before Hal Robson-Kanu and Sam Vokes confirmed a 3–1 victory for Wales. This victory advanced Wales to their first major tournament semi-final.

Wales lost 2–0 in the semi-final against Portugal with goals from Cristiano Ronaldo and Nani early in the second half. Wales were welcomed back home on 8 July with an open-top bus parade around Cardiff, starting at Cardiff Castle and going past the Millennium Stadium before finishing at the Cardiff City Stadium.

==== 2018 World Cup qualification and China Cup ====
Wales finished third in their 2018 World Cup qualifying group, therefore failing to qualify for the final tournament. Chris Coleman resigned as Wales manager on 17 November 2017 to join Sunderland.

Wales were invited to participate in the 2018 China Cup alongside China, Czech Republic and Uruguay. Wales beat China 6–0 in the semi-final but lost 1–0 in the final to Uruguay.

=== 2020s ===
On 15 January 2018, Ryan Giggs was confirmed as new manager. Despite losing two of the first three qualifiers for UEFA Euro 2020, Wales went unbeaten in the second half of 2019 and ultimately qualified in second place following a 2–0 win over Hungary in their final match on 19 November. Euro 2020 was delayed until 2021 by the COVID-19 pandemic in Europe, which meant Wales' next games came in the 2020–21 UEFA Nations League. They kept five consecutive clean sheets on the way to an unbeaten record in the competition, winning five games and drawing one, despite Giggs not being available for the last two games due to legal troubles. With Rob Page in interim charge, the team beat Finland 3–1 in their final match to finish top of the group and gain promotion to League A for the 2022–23 UEFA Nations League.

UEFA Euro 2020 was played in June and July 2021. Under Page as interim manager, Wales progressed from the group stage after finishing second in the group on goal difference. In the last 16 round Wales lost to Denmark in Amsterdam.

The team that defeated Ukraine on 5 June 2022 to qualify for the 2022 World Cup

Rob Page remained in interim charge for the 2022 World Cup qualification campaign. Wales finished second in Group E and progressed to the qualification play-off stage. After beating Austria in the play-off semi-final, Wales qualified for the World Cup for the first time since 1958 with a 1–0 win over Ukraine.

Following their promotion in the previous Nations League campaign, Wales were drawn in Group A4 of the 2022–23 UEFA Nations League along with Belgium, the Netherlands and Poland, with Rob Page still interim manager.

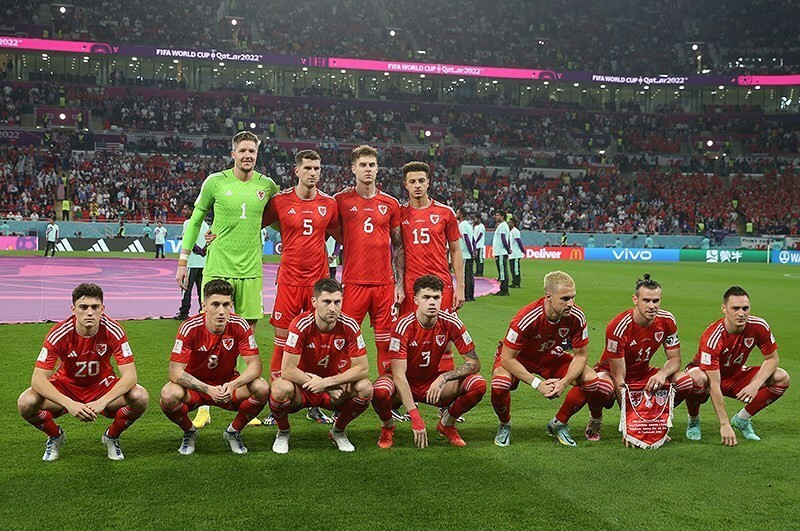
Wales line up against United States at the 2022 FIFA World Cup in Qatar

On 20 June 2022, Ryan Giggs resigned as Wales manager due to his upcoming court case. Page stayed on as interim manager before being given a four-year contract extension in September 2022, managing Wales at the 2022 World Cup in Qatar. After a 1–1 draw with the United States in the opening match, Wales lost their second match to Iran after conceding two injury time goals. In their final match, Wales were eliminated after losing 3–0 to England, therefore, finishing bottom of the group.

On 9 January 2023, Wales captain Gareth Bale retired from club and international football. At the time of his retirement he was the record goal scorer and record appearance holder for Wales.

During UEFA Euro 2024 qualification, Wales finished 3rd in their group, meaning they would need to qualify via the play-offs. In the play-off semi-final, Wales beat Finland 4–1 but lost the play-off final to Poland on penalties. In June 2024, Rob Page was sacked as Wales' manager following a 0-0 friendly draw to Gibraltar and a 4–0 defeat to Slovakia.

Craig Bellamy was announced as the head coach of the Welsh national team on 9 July 2024. In Wales' first campaign under Bellamy, they finished top of Group B4 in the 2024-25 UEFA Nations League, with Bellamy going unbeaten in his first 9 matches until a 4–3 defeat to Belgium in Brussels.

On 18 November 2025, Wales achieved a 7–1 victory over North Macedonia to secure a second place play-off position in Group J of the 2026 FIFA World Cup qualifiers.

== Team image ==
=== Media coverage ===
Live television broadcast rights are held by S4C (Welsh language commentary) and BBC Cymru Wales (English language commentary)

=== Colours and logo ===
The primary kit has long been all-red. The crest of the Football Association of Wales features a rampant Welsh Dragon on a white shield. From 1920, the shield was surrounded by a red border, and the letters 'FAW' were added in 1926. The badge was redesigned in 1951, adding a green border with 11 daffodils, as well as the Welsh-language motto Gorau Chwarae Cyd Chwarae ("The best play is team play"). The motto was briefly removed in 1984, but the badge stayed largely the same until 2010, when the shield was changed to feature rounded sides and the motto banner was changed from white to red and green. The dragon also changed from rampant to rampant regardant. The motto was removed again in 2019, following another major redesign of the badge, which saw the top of the shield flattened and the sides changed not to curve outwards; the green border was also thinned and the daffodils removed.

=== Kit supplier ===
Kit provider	Period
(England) Admiral	1976–1980
(Germany) Adidas	1980–1987
(Denmark) Hummel	1987–1990
(England) Umbro	1990–1996
(Italy) Lotto	1996–2000
(Italy) Kappa	2000–2008
(United States) Champion	2008–2010
(England) Umbro	2010–2013
(Germany) Adidas	2013–2026
(England) SUDU	2026–present

=== Name ===
The team is sometimes known and branded mononymously as "Cymru", the Welsh language name for Wales, by the Football Association of Wales (FAW; or in Welsh: Cymdeithas Bêl-droed Cymru; CBC), as the FAW uses the term in its internal and external communications. In October 2022, the FAW announced it was considering rebranding the team to use only the Welsh name for the country, ditching the term "Wales", following the 2022 FIFA World Cup. The association said it was in discussions with UEFA over how to change the name, and was inspired by Turkey's rebrand to Türkiye and not being the last country alphabetically in some football events. University of Limerick professor Owen Worth said this suggestion was an example of the connection between the team's supporters' clubs and pro-Welsh independence groups such as YesCymru and AUOB Cymru.

=== Pre-match squad photo routine ===
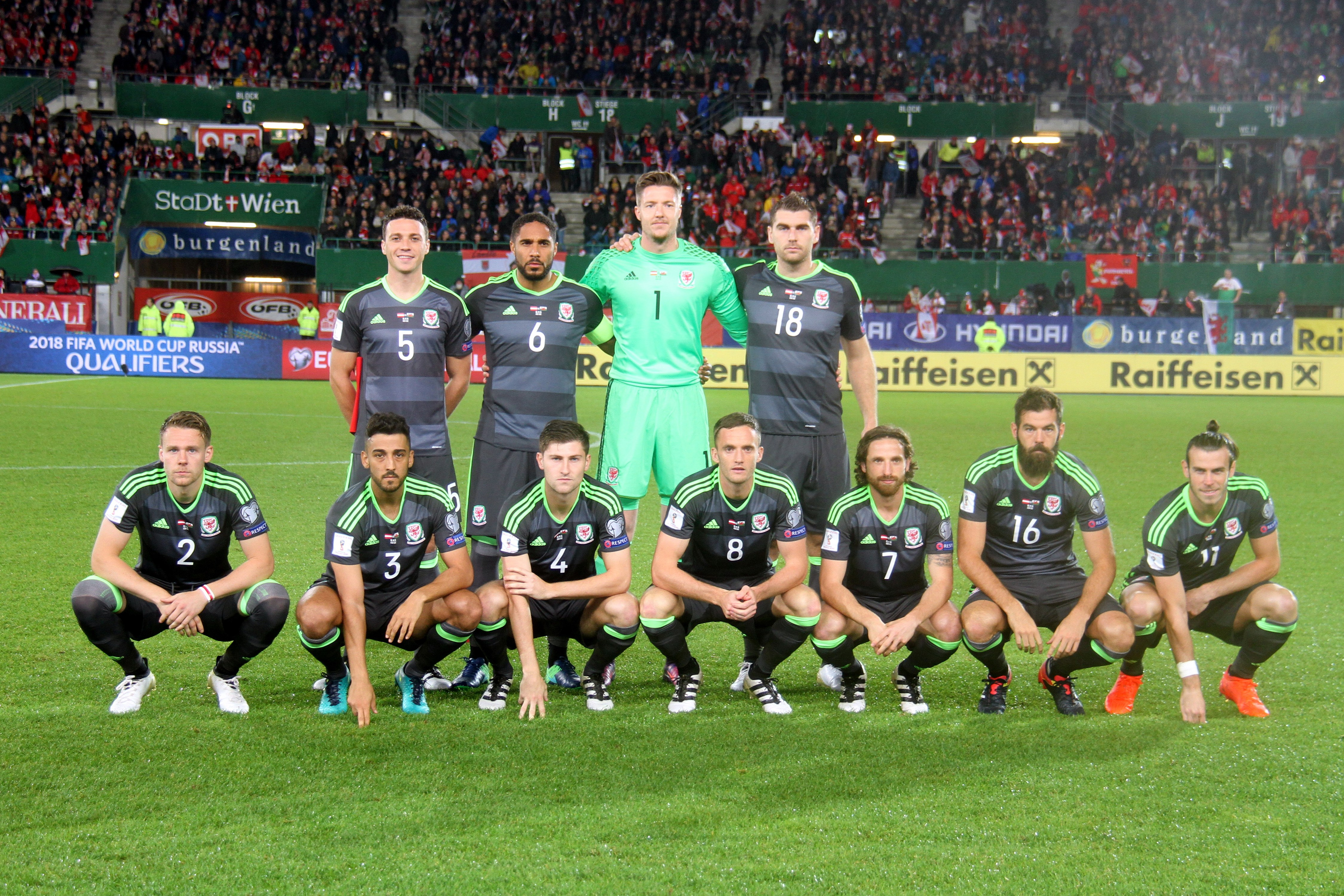
Wales pre-match photo against Austria in a FIFA World Cup 2018 qualifier

During the Euro 2016 tournament, the squad's pre-match photos went viral due to the players' unusual and awkward arrangement in them. At the time, Joe Ledley noted that they were "just not very good at them" but that it had become a good luck charm to not take a proper photo. In 2025, after the Wales national women's team had done the same during the Women's Euro 2025 tournament, a Welsh team spokesperson stated that it had started by accident but has since become a tradition to pose unconventionally for both national teams. It has also been noted that the awkward arrangement of the Welsh pre-match photo goes as far back as 2002.

== Home stadium ==
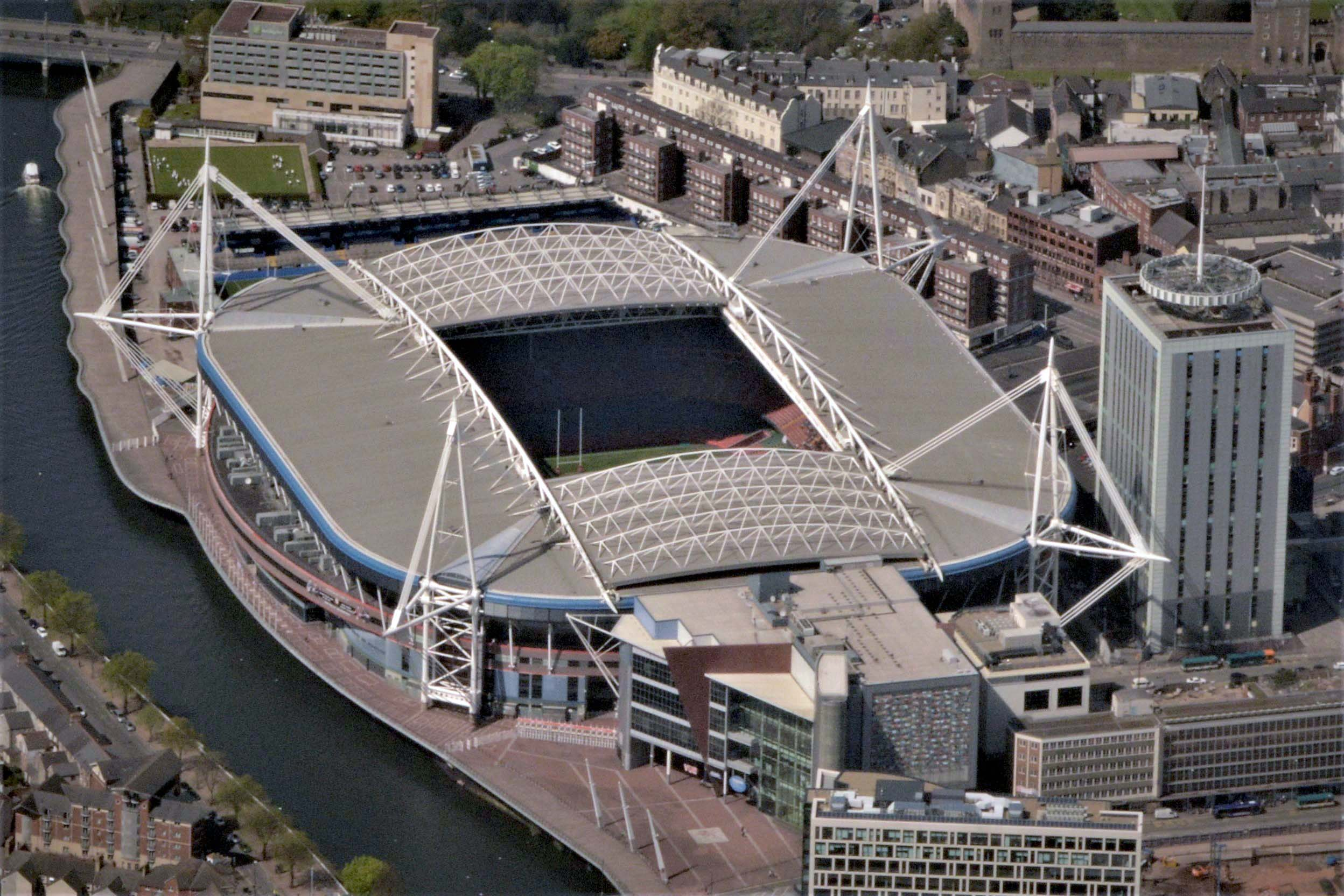
The Millennium Stadium, Cardiff

From 2000 to 2009, Wales played most of their home matches at the Millennium Stadium, Cardiff. The stadium was built in 1999 on the site of the old National Stadium, known as Cardiff Arms Park, as the Welsh Rugby Union (WRU) had been chosen to host the 1999 Rugby World Cup. Prior to 1989, Wales played their home games at the grounds of Cardiff City, Swansea City and Wrexham, but then came to an agreement with the WRU to use Cardiff Arms Park and, subsequently, the Millennium Stadium.

Wales' first football match at the Millennium Stadium was against Finland on 29 March 2000. The Finns won the match 2–1, with Jari Litmanen becoming the first player to score a goal at the stadium. Ryan Giggs scored Wales' goal in the match, becoming the first Welshman to score at the stadium.

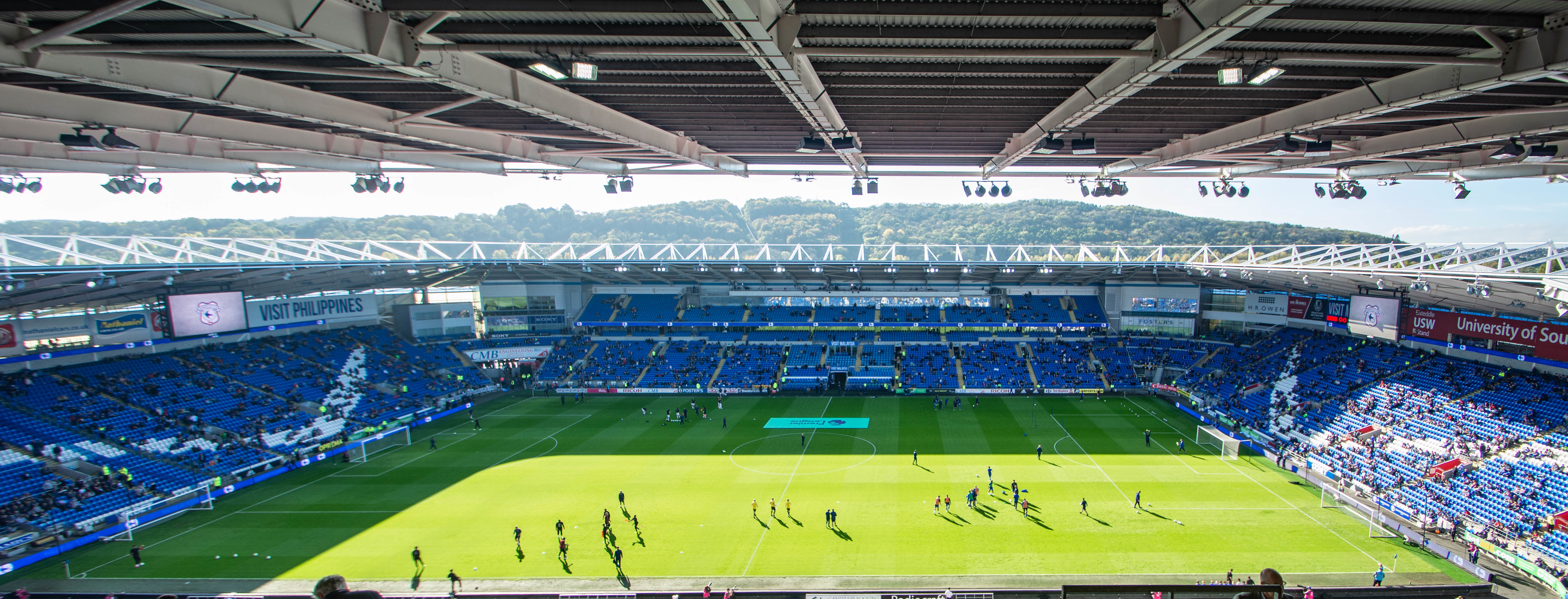
Cardiff City Stadium, Cardiff

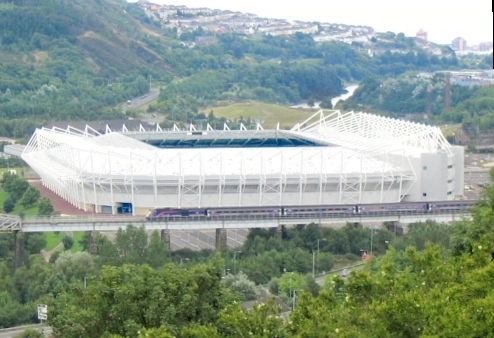
Liberty Stadium, Swansea

With the opening of the Cardiff City Stadium in 2009, the FAW chose to stage most home friendlies there, with other friendly matches played at the Liberty Stadium in Swansea (now known as the Swansea.com Stadium) and the Racecourse Ground in Wrexham. Qualifying matches continued to be played at the 74,500-capacity Millennium Stadium until the end of 2009, which was typically only around 20–40% full amid poor team results. This led to calls from fans and players for international matches to be held at smaller stadiums. For the Euro 2012 qualifying campaign, the FAW decided Wales would play all of their home matches at either the Cardiff City Stadium or the Liberty Stadium, with the exception of the home tie against England, which was played at the Millennium Stadium. The 2014 World Cup qualifying campaign saw four home matches at the Cardiff City Stadium and one at the Liberty Stadium. Cardiff City Stadium's capacity was increased to 33,000 in 2014 and all home matches for Euro 2016 qualifying were scheduled at the stadium and Wales subsequently qualified for the finals tournament in France. All five home qualifiers for the 2018 FIFA World Cup were held at the stadium as well as both of the team's home 2018–19 UEFA Nations League games. All home games in the Euro 2020 qualifying campaign also took place there. A friendly against Spain was played at the Millennium Stadium on 11 October 2018, which was Wales' first match at the stadium in just over seven-and-a-half years, finishing in a 4–1 defeat. On 20 March 2019, Wales played a friendly against Trinidad and Tobago at the Racecourse Ground, their first match there since 2008.

== Results and fixtures ==
The following is a list of match results in the last 12 months, as well as any future matches that have been scheduled.

Win Draw Loss Fixture

=== 2026 ===
26 March 2026 2026 World Cup qualification play-offs	Wales	1–1 (a.e.t.) (2–4 p)	Bosnia and Herzegovina	Cardiff, Wales
19:45 UTC+0	D. James 51'	Report	Džeko 86'	Stadium: Cardiff City Stadium; Attendance: 32,487; Referee: István Kovács (Romania)
	Penalties
	Wilson (penalty scored); Harris (penalty scored); Johnson (penalty missed); Williams (penalty missed)		(penalty missed) Demirović; (penalty scored) Tabakovic; (penalty scored) Bašić; (penalty scored) Hadziahmetovic; (penalty scored) Alajbegović

31 March 2026 Friendly	Wales	1–1	Northern Ireland	Cardiff, Wales
19:45 UTC+1	Thomas 46'	Report	Donley 22'	Stadium: Cardiff City Stadium; Attendance: 33,280; Referee: Robert Hennessy (Ireland)

2 June 2026 Friendly	Wales	1–1	Ghana	Cardiff, Wales
19:45 UTC+1	Koumas 90+3'	Report	Yirenkyi 66'	Stadium: Cardiff City Stadium; Attendance: 11,806; Referee: Oscar Johnson (Sweden)

6 June 2026 Friendly	Romania	2–1	Wales	Bucharest, Romania
18:45 UTC+3	Coman 52'; Rus 80'	Report	Brooks 63'	Stadium: Steaua Stadium; Attendance: 23,276; Referee: Rohit Saggi (Norway)

24 September 2026 2026–27 UEFA Nations League	Portugal	1–0	Wales	Lisbon, Portugal
19:45 UTC+1	Félix 22'	Report		Stadium: Estádio José Alvalade; Attendance: 47,725; Referee: Donatas Rumšas (Lithuania)

27 September 2026 2026–27 UEFA Nations League	Denmark	2–0	Wales	Copenhagen, Denmark
18:00 UTC+2	Davies 53' (o.g.); Isaksen 66'	UEFA report		Stadium: Parken Stadium; Attendance: 34,588; Referee: Willy Delajod (France)

1 October 2026 2026–27 UEFA Nations League	Wales	2–1	Norway	Cardiff, Wales
19:45 UTC+1	James 38'; Williams 48'	Report	Bobb 11'	Stadium: Cardiff City Stadium; Attendance: 32,076; Referee: Alejandro Hernández Hernández (Spain)

4 October 2026 2026–27 UEFA Nations League	Wales	0–1	Denmark	Cardiff, Wales
19:45 UTC+1		Report	Højlund 75' (pen.)	Stadium: Cardiff City Stadium; Attendance: 25,108; Referee: Irfan Peljto (Bosnia and Herzegovina)

14 November 2026 2026–27 UEFA Nations League	Norway	3–1	Wales	Oslo, Norway
18:00 UTC+1	Nusa 59'; Schjelderup 68'; Haaland 88' (pen.)	Report	Brooks 79'	Stadium: Ullevaal Stadion; Attendance: 25,317; Referee: Oleksii Derevinskyi (Ukraine)

17 November 2026 2026–27 UEFA Nations League	Wales	2–3	Portugal	Cardiff, Wales
19:45 UTC+0	Brooks 13'; Thomas 40'	Report	Fernandes 11'; Neto 43'; Forbs 70'	Stadium: Cardiff City Stadium; Attendance: 32,682; Referee: Sven Jablonski (Germany)

== Coaching staff ==
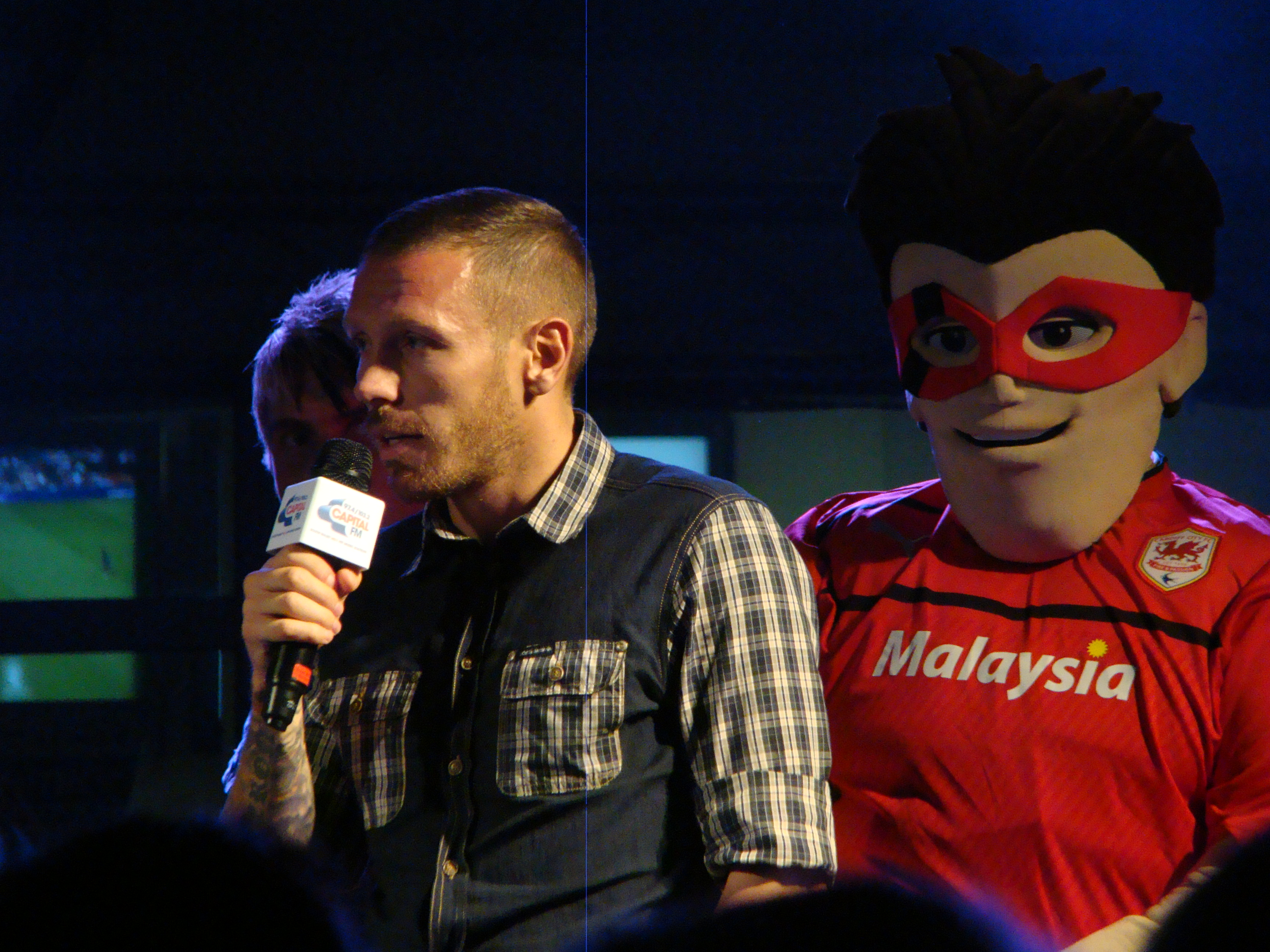
Current head coach Craig Bellamy

Position	Name
Head Coach	(Wales) Craig Bellamy
Assistant Coaches	(Wales) Andrew Crofts (Wales) Ashley Williams (Republic of Ireland) Alan Sheehan (Wales) Ryland Morgans
Head of Performance	(Wales) Nick Davies
Goalkeeping Coach	(Wales) Martyn Margetson
Fitness Coach	(Wales) Adam Owen
Medical Officer	(England) Jon Houghton
Team Doctor	(Wales) Dr. Rhodri Martin
Performance Psychologist	(Wales) Ian Mitchell
Physiotherapists	(England) Sean Connelly
Physiotherapists	(Wales) David Rowe
Physiotherapists	(England) Chris Senior
Physiotherapists	(England) Paul Harris
Sports Scientist	(Republic of Ireland) Ronan Kavanagh
Equipment Officers	(Wales) David Griffiths
Equipment Officers	(Wales) Kevin McCusker
Performance Analysts	(Wales) Esther Wills
Performance Analysts	(Wales) James Turner

=== Coaching history ===
Caretaker manager are listed in italics.

Prior to 1954 the Welsh team was chosen by a panel of selectors with the team captain fulfilling the role of coach.

- (Wales) Walley Barnes (1954–1955)
- (Wales) Jimmy Murphy (1956–1964)
- (Wales) Dave Bowen (1964–1974)
- (Wales) Ron Burgess (1965)
- (England) Mike Smith (1974–1979)
- (Wales) Mike England (1979–1987)
- (Wales) David Williams (1988)
- (Wales) Terry Yorath (1988–1993)
- (Wales) John Toshack (1994)
- (England) Mike Smith (1994–1995)
- (England) Bobby Gould (1995–1999)
- (Wales) Neville Southall (1999)
- (Wales) Mark Hughes (1999–2004)
- (Wales) John Toshack (2004–2010)
- (Wales) Brian Flynn (2010)
- (Wales) Gary Speed (2010–2011)
- (Wales) Chris Coleman (2012–2017)
- (Wales) Ryan Giggs (2018–2020)
- (Wales) Rob Page (2020–2024)
- (Wales) Craig Bellamy (2024–present)

== Players ==
=== Current squad ===
Wales named the following squad for the UEFA Nations League matches against Norway on 14 November and Portugal on 17 November. On 10 November, Kieffer Moore withdrew through injury and was replaced by Aaron Collins.

Caps and goals are correct as of 17 November 2026, after the match against Portugal.

No.	Pos.	Player	Date of birth (age)	Caps	Goals	Club
12	GK	Danny Ward	22 June 1993 (age 33)	50	0	(Football Association of Wales) Wrexham
1	GK	Karl Darlow	8 October 1990 (age 36)	16	0	(The Football Association) Manchester United
21	GK	Joe Duncan	22 July 2006 (age 20)	0	0	(The Football Association) Southend United
4	DF	Ben Davies	24 April 1993 (age 33)	106	3	(The Football Association) Tottenham Hotspur
14	DF	Connor Roberts	23 September 1995 (age 31)	67	3	(The Football Association) Burnley
6	DF	Joe Rodon	22 October 1997 (age 29)	64	2	(The Football Association) Leeds United
2	DF	Chris Mepham	5 November 1997 (age 29)	57	0	(The Football Association) West Bromwich Albion
5	DF	Ben Cabango	30 May 2000 (age 26)	20	0	(Football Association of Wales) Swansea City
3	DF	Jay Dasilva	22 April 1998 (age 28)	15	0	(The Football Association) Coventry City
16	DF	Jayden Lienou	8 April 2008 (age 18)	0	0	(The Football Association) Leeds United
22	MF	Josh Sheehan	30 March 1995 (age 31)	24	0	(The Football Association) Bolton Wanderers
10	MF	Liam Cullen	23 April 1999 (age 27)	18	2	(The Football Association) Leicester City
17	MF	Rubin Colwill	27 April 2002 (age 24)	12	1	(Football Association of Wales) Cardiff City
	MF	Joel Colwill	27 October 2004 (age 22)	4	0	(Football Association of Wales) Cardiff City
23	MF	Kai Andrews	6 August 2006 (age 20)	3	0	(The Football Association) Oxford United
15	MF	Cian Ashford	24 September 2004 (age 22)	0	0	(Football Association of Wales) Cardiff City
8	FW	Harry Wilson	22 March 1997 (age 29)	71	17	(The Football Association) Leeds United
20	FW	Daniel James	10 November 1997 (age 29)	70	11	(The Football Association) Leeds United
11	FW	Brennan Johnson	23 May 2001 (age 25)	51	7	(The Football Association) Everton
7	FW	David Brooks	8 July 1997 (age 29)	48	9	(The Football Association) Bournemouth
19	FW	Sorba Thomas	25 January 1999 (age 27)	32	3	(The Football Association) Hull City
18	FW	Mark Harris	29 December 1998 (age 27)	20	0	(The Football Association) Oxford United
9	FW	Lewis Koumas	19 September 2005 (age 21)	18	1	(The Football Association) Liverpool
13	FW	Aaron Collins	27 May 1997 (age 29)	1	0	(The Football Association) Milton Keynes Dons

=== Recent call-ups ===
The following players have also been called up for the team within the last twelve months.

Pos.	Player	Date of birth (age)	Caps	Goals	Club	Latest call-up
GK	Tom King	9 March 1995 (age 31)	1	0	(England) Everton	v. Denmark, 4 October 2026
GK	David Cornell	28 March 1991 (age 35)	0	0	(England) Leicester City	v. Denmark, 4 October 2026
GK	Adam Davies	17 July 1992 (age 34)	6	0	(England) Sheffield United	v. Northern Ireland, 31 March 2026
DF	Neco Williams	13 April 2001 (age 25)	62	5	(England) Nottingham Forest	v. Portugal, 17 November 2026 ^{INJ}
DF	Rhys Norrington-Davies	22 April 1999 (age 27)	17	1	(England) Sheffield United	v. Denmark, 4 October 2026
DF	Ronan Kpakio	25 May 2007 (age 19)	4	0	(Wales) Cardiff City	v. Romania, 6 June 2026
DF	Dylan Lawlor	1 January 2006 (age 20)	6	0	(Wales) Cardiff City	v. Romania, 6 June 2026^{INJ}
MF	Ethan Ampadu	14 September 2000 (age 26)	68	0	(England) Leeds United	v. Portugal, 17 November 2026 ^{SUS}
MF	Jordan James	2 July 2004 (age 22)	30	1	(England) Wolverhampton Wanderers	v. Denmark, 4 October 2026
MF	Wes Burns	23 November 1994 (age 31)	12	0	(England) Leicester City	v. Denmark, 4 October 2026
MF	Charlie Savage	2 May 2003 (age 23)	3	0	(England) Reading	v. Denmark, 4 October 2026
MF	Cameron Congreve	24 January 2004 (age 22)	2	0	(Belgium) Westerlo	v. Denmark, 4 October 2026
MF	Ollie Bostock	20 February 2007 (age 19)	0	0	(England) West Bromwich Albion	v. Romania, 6 June 2026
FW	Kieffer Moore	8 August 1992 (age 34)	57	15	(Wales) Wrexham	v. Norway, 14 November 2026 ^{INJ}
FW	Joe Taylor	18 November 2002 (age 24)	0	0	(England) Huddersfield Town	v. Denmark, 4 October 2026
FW	Nathan Broadhead	5 April 1998 (age 28)	20	4	(Wales) Wrexham	v. Portugal, 24 September 2026 ^{INJ}
FW	Isaak Davies	25 September 2001 (age 25)	2	0	(Wales) Cardiff City	v. Romania, 6 June 2026
FW	Rabbi Matondo	9 September 2000 (age 26)	15	1	Unattached	v. Northern Ireland, 31 March 2026
^{INJ} Withdrew due to injury^{WD} Withdrew from the squad due to non-injury issue^{SUS} Serving suspension^{RET} Retired from the national team

== Individual records ==
As of 18 November 2026
Players in bold are still active with Wales.

=== Most appearances ===
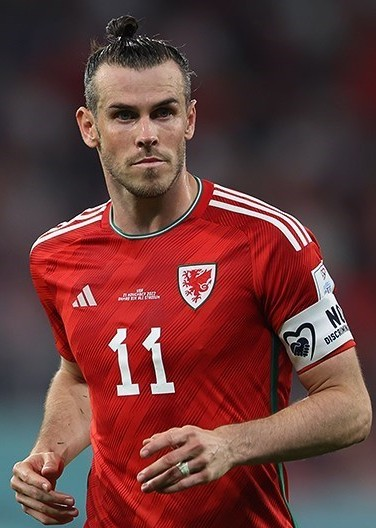
Gareth Bale played a record 111 matches for Wales between 2006 and 2022, and is also Wales top goalscorer with 41 goals.

Rank	Player	Caps	Goals	Career
1	Gareth Bale	111	41	2006–2022
2	Chris Gunter	109	0	2007–2022
2	Wayne Hennessey	109	0	2007–2023
4	**Ben Davies**	106	3	2012–present
5	Neville Southall	92	0	1982–1997
6	Aaron Ramsey	86	21	2008–2024
6	Ashley Williams	86	2	2008–2019
8	Gary Speed	85	7	1990–2004
9	Craig Bellamy	78	19	1998–2013
10	Joe Allen	77	2	2009–2025
10	Joe Ledley	77	4	2005–2018

=== Top goalscorers ===
Rank	Player	Goals	Caps	Ratio	Career
1	Gareth Bale (list)	41	111	0.37	2006–2022
2	Ian Rush (list)	28	73	0.38	1980–1996
3	Trevor Ford	23	38	0.61	1947–1957
3	Ivor Allchurch	23	68	0.34	1951–1966
5	Dean Saunders	22	75	0.29	1986–2001
6	Aaron Ramsey	21	86	0.24	2008–2024
7	Craig Bellamy	19	78	0.24	1998–2013
8	**Harry Wilson**	17	71	0.24	2013–present
9	Robert Earnshaw	16	59	0.27	2002–2011
9	Cliff Jones	16	59	0.27	1954–1970
9	Mark Hughes	16	72	0.22	1984–1999

=== Notable former players ===
==== Welsh Sports Hall of Fame inductees ====
- Ivor Allchurch
- Horace Blew
- Ronnie Burgess
- John Charles
- Trevor Ford
- Ryan Giggs
- Mark Hughes
- Bryn Jones
- Cliff Jones
- Fred Keenor
- Jack Kelsey
- George Latham
- Billy Meredith
- Jimmy Murphy
- Ivor Powell
- Kevin Ratcliffe
- Ian Rush
- Alf Sherwood
- Neville Southall
- Gary Speed
- John Toshack
- Terry Yorath

==== Welsh inductees to the English Football Hall of Fame ====
- 2002 – John Charles
- 2005 – Ryan Giggs
- 2006 – Ian Rush
- 2007 – Mark Hughes, Billy Meredith
- 2013 – Cliff Jones
- 2015 – Ivor Allchurch
- 2016 – Neville Southall
- 2017 – Gary Speed

==== Welsh winners of the FWA Footballer of the Year ====
- Ian Rush (1984)
- Neville Southall (1985)
- Gareth Bale (2013)

==== Welsh winners of the PFA Players' Player of the Year ====
- Ian Rush (1984)
- Mark Hughes (1989, 1991)
- Ryan Giggs (2009)
- Gareth Bale (2011, 2013)

== Team records ==
- Biggest win

Wales 11–0 Ireland
(Wrexham, Wales; 3 March 1888)

- Biggest defeat

Scotland 9–0 Wales
(Glasgow, Scotland; 23 March 1878)

== Competitive record ==
=== FIFA World Cup ===
FIFA World Cup record									Qualification record						Qualification play-off record					
Year	Round	Position	Pld	W	D*	L	GF	GA	Pld	W	D	L	GF	GA	Pld	W	D	L	GF	GA
(Uruguay) 1930	Not a FIFA member								Not a FIFA member						—N/a					
(Italy) 1934	Not a FIFA member								Not a FIFA member						—N/a					
(France) 1938	Not a FIFA member								Not a FIFA member						—N/a					
(Brazil) 1950	Did not qualify								3	0	1	2	1	6	—N/a					
(Switzerland) 1954	Did not qualify								3	0	1	2	5	9	—N/a					
(Sweden) 1958	Quarter-finals	5th	5	1	3*	1	4	4	6	4	0	2	10	5	2	2	0	0	4	0
(Chile) 1962	Did not qualify								2	0	1	1	2	3	—N/a					
(England) 1966	Did not qualify								6	3	0	3	11	9	—N/a					
(Mexico) 1970	Did not qualify								4	0	0	4	3	10	—N/a					
(West Germany) 1974	Did not qualify								4	1	1	2	3	5	—N/a					
(Argentina) 1978	Did not qualify								4	1	0	3	3	4	—N/a					
(Spain) 1982	Did not qualify								8	4	2	2	12	7	—N/a					
(Mexico) 1986	Did not qualify								6	3	1	2	7	6	—N/a					
(Italy) 1990	Did not qualify								6	0	2	4	4	8	—N/a					
(United States) 1994	Did not qualify								10	5	2	3	19	12	—N/a					
(France) 1998	Did not qualify								8	2	1	5	20	21	—N/a					
(South Korea) (Japan) 2002	Did not qualify								10	1	6	3	10	12	—N/a					
(Germany) 2006	Did not qualify								10	2	2	6	10	15	—N/a					
(South Africa) 2010	Did not qualify								10	4	0	6	9	12	—N/a					
(Brazil) 2014	Did not qualify								10	3	1	6	9	20	—N/a					
(Russia) 2018	Did not qualify								10	4	5	1	13	6	—N/a					
(Qatar) 2022	Group stage	30th	3	0	1*	2	1	6	10	6	3	1	17	10	2	2	0	0	3	1
(Canada) (Mexico) (United States) 2026	Did not qualify								8	5	1	2	21	11	1	0	1	0	1	1
(Morocco) (Portugal) (Spain) 2030	To be determined								To be determined						To be determined					
(Saudi Arabia) 2034	To be determined								To be determined						To be determined					
Total:2/20	Quarter-finals	5th	8	1	4*	3	5	10	138	48	30	60	189	191	5	4	1	0	8	2

=== UEFA European Championship ===
UEFA European Championship record									Qualifying record						Qualifying play-off record					
Year	Round	Position	Pld	W	D*	L	GF	GA	Pld	W	D	L	GF	GA	Pld	W	D	L	GF	GA
(France) 1960	Did not enter								Did not enter						—N/a					
(Spain) 1964	Did not qualify								2	0	1	1	2	4	—N/a					
(Italy) 1968	Did not qualify								6	1	2	3	6	12	—N/a					
(Belgium) 1972	Did not qualify								6	2	1	3	5	6	—N/a					
(Socialist Federal Republic of Yugoslavia) 1976 (Note: Wales progressed through UEFA Euro 1976 qualifying to the quarter-finals, though this was played on a two-legged, home-and-away basis and is not considered part of the finals tournament.)	Did not qualify								6	5	0	1	14	4	2	0	1	1	1	3
(Italy) 1980	Did not qualify								6	3	0	3	11	8	—N/a					
(France) 1984	Did not qualify								6	2	3	1	7	6	—N/a					
(West Germany) 1988	Did not qualify								6	2	2	2	7	5	—N/a					
(Sweden) 1992	Did not qualify								6	4	1	1	8	6	—N/a					
(England) 1996	Did not qualify								10	2	2	6	9	19	—N/a					
(Belgium) (Netherlands) 2000	Did not qualify								8	3	0	5	7	16	—N/a					
(Portugal) 2004	Did not qualify								8	4	1	3	13	10	2	0	1	1	0	1
(Austria) (Switzerland) 2008	Did not qualify								12	4	3	5	18	19	—N/a					
(Poland) (Ukraine) 2012	Did not qualify								8	3	0	5	6	10	—N/a					
(France) 2016	Semi-finals	3rd	6	4	0	2	10	6	10	6	3	1	11	4	—N/a					
(Europe) 2020	Round of 16	16th	4	1	1*	2	3	6	8	4	2	2	10	6	—N/a					
(Germany) 2024	Did not qualify								8	3	3	2	10	10	2	1	1	0	4	1
(England) (Scotland) (Wales) (Republic of Ireland) 2028	To be determined								To be determined						To be determined					
(Italy) (Turkey) 2032	To be determined								To be determined						To be determined					
Total	Semi-finals	2/16	10	5	1*	4	13	12	116	48	24	44	144	145	6	1	3	2	5	5

Notes

* Red border colour indicates tournament held on home soil.
* The Qualifying record section contains only the games played in the qualifying blocks and not those played in the play-offs.

=== UEFA Nations League ===
UEFA Nations League record
Season	Division	Group	Round	Pld	W	D*	L	GF	GA	Pts	P/R	Rank
2018–19	B	4	Group stage	4	2	0	2	6	5	6	Same position	19th
2020–21	B	4	Group stage	6	5	1*	0	7	1	16	▲	17th
2022–23	A	4	Group stage	6	0	1*	5	6	11	1	▼	16th
2024–25	B	4	Group stage	6	3	3*	0	9	4	12	▲	19th
2026–27	A	4	Group stage	6	1	0	5	5	11	3	TBD	13rd
2026–27	A	Relegation play-off	TBD	0	0	0	0	0	0	-	TBD	13rd
Total			Group stage	28	11	5*	12	33	31	38	16th	

== Honours ==
=== Regional ===
- British Home Championship
  - Champions: 1907, 1920, 1924, 1928, 1933, 1934, 1937, 1939^{s}, 1952^{s}, 1956^{s}, 1960^{s}, 1970^{s}

=== Friendly ===
- China Cup
  - Runners-up: 2018
- Kirin Cup
  - Runners-up: 1992

Notes

- ^{s} Shared titles

== See also ==
- Wales at the FIFA World Cup
- Wales at the UEFA European Championship
- Wales national under-21 football team
- Wales national under-20 football team
- Wales national under-19 football team
- Wales national under-18 football team
- Wales national under-17 football team
- Wales women's national football team
- Wales women's national under-17 football team
- Wales national futsal team

== Bibliography ==
- Stead, Phil (2015). Red Dragons - the Story of Welsh Football. Y Lolfa. ISBN 978-1-78461-236-8. OL 34620922M.
