= Joe Duncan (footballer) =

Welsh association football player (born 2007)

Personal information
- Date of birth: 22 July 2006 (age 20)
- Place of birth: Bristol, England
- Position: Goalkeeper

Team information
- Current team: Southend United (on loan from Bristol City)
- Number: 1

Youth career
- –2026: Bristol City

Senior career*
Years	Team	Apps	(Gls)
2026–	Bristol City	0	(0)
2026–	→ Southend United (loan)	11	(0)

International career
2026–	Wales U21	2	(0)
- * Club domestic league appearances and goals as of 4 November 2026 (UTC)

Joe Duncan (born 22 July 2006) is a Welsh professional footballer who plays as a goalkeeper for Southend United on loan from EFL Championship club Bristol City. He is a Wales U21 international.

== Club career ==
Born in Bristol, Duncan joined the youth set-up at Bristol City at the age of 11 years-old. He signed a first professional contract with the club in 2023. In the two following seasons, he had periods on-loan at Tiverton Town and Farnborough and signed a new contract with Bristol City in 2025.

Duncan signed for Southend United on a season-long loan in July 2026. He was named Southend Player of the Month for August.

== International career ==
Duncan was called-up to the Jamaica U23 team in March 2024. In September 2026, he was called up to the Wales U21 team. He made his debut against Belgium U21 in a 1–0 away defeat in a 2027 UEFA European Under-21 Championship qualification match on 29 September 2026, and retaining his place for the next match against Austria U21.

In November 2026, Duncan received a first call-up to the senior Wales national football team.

== Personal life ==
From St Pauls, Bristol, he is of Jamaican and Welsh descent.
