= Bristol City F.C. =

Association football club in England

Bristol City
- Full name: Bristol City Football Club
- Nicknames: The Robins; The Reds; Cider Army; Red Army
- Short name: BCFC
- Founded: 1894; 132 years ago
- Ground: Ashton Gate
- Capacity: 27,000
- Owner: Steve Lansdown
- Chairman: Jon Lansdown
- Manager: Michael Skubala
- League: EFL Championship
- 2025–26: EFL Championship, 12th of 24
- Website: bcfc.co.uk

Bristol City Football Club is a professional men's football club based in Bristol, England. The team compete in the EFL Championship, the second level of the English football league system.

Founded in 1894 the club competed in the Southern League and Western League, being crowned Western League champions in 1897–98. They were admitted into the Football League in 1901 and won the Second Division in 1905–06. They finished second in the First Division the following season, three points behind champions Newcastle United, and went on to lose to Manchester United in the 1909 FA Cup final. Relegated in 1911, they dropped to the third tier in 1922, though would claim the Third Division South title in 1922–23 and again in 1926–27. They were returned to the third tier in 1932, remaining there until they won the Third Division South again in 1954–55. Having been relegated in 1960, Bristol City won promotion from the third tier in 1964–65 and then from the second tier in 1975–76. They played four seasons in the top-flight before being relegated in three consecutive seasons by 1982.

Bristol City spent just two seasons in the Fourth Division and went on to win the Associate Members' Cup (Football League Trophy) in 1986. Promoted out of the Third Division in 1989–90, the club were relegated in 1995 and again in 1999 after another promotion in 1997–98. Bristol City won the Football League Trophy again in 2003, and were promoted from League One in 2006–07. Relegated after six seasons in the Championship, they won the Football League Trophy for a third time in 2015 on their way to the 2014–15 League One title, and have remained in the Championship since that promotion.

They have played their home games at Ashton Gate since moving from St John's Lane in 1904. The club's home colours are red and white, and their nickname is The Robins—a robin featured on the club's badge from 1976 to 1994 and from 2019 onwards. Their main rivals are Bristol Rovers, with whom they contest the Bristol derby, and Cardiff City, with whom they contest the cross-border Severnside derby.

== History ==
=== Early years and early successes (1894–1922) ===
The club was founded in 1894 as Bristol South End and changed their name to Bristol City on adopting professionalism three years later when they were admitted into the Southern League. Finishing as runners-up in three of the first four seasons, in 1900 the club amalgamated with local Southern League rivals Bedminster F.C., who had been founded as Southville in 1887. Bristol City joined the Football League in 1901 when they became only the third club south of Birmingham (following in the footsteps of Woolwich Arsenal and Luton Town) to perform in the competition. Their first game in the Football League was on 7 September 1901 at Bloomfield Road, when Blackpool were beaten 2–0.

A scheme has been informally approved by the parties interested for the amalgamation of the Bristol City and Bedminster Association Football Clubs. The leading conditions are that the name and colours of Bristol City shall be retained, that matches shall be played alternately on the ground of each club for one season, and that five directors shall be nominated by each club. This should lead to Bristol securing one of the strongest teams in the south.

— Gloucestershire Echo, 12 April 1900. The announcement of the merger between Bristol City and Bedminster.

Winning the Second Division Championship with a record number of points when they became the first club in Football League history to win 30 league games in a season (out of 38 played) as well as equalling Manchester United's achievement of the previous season in winning 14 consecutive games (a record until 2017, also accomplished by Preston North End in 1950–51). Nicknamed the Bristol Babe at this time, they finished as runners-up in their inaugural First Division campaign (1906–07) as the only southern club to finish in the top two prior to World War I.

In 1909 they won through to their only FA Cup final, though they were somewhat fortunate that a last-gasp spot-kick saved them from defeat in the semi-final versus Derby County at Stamford Bridge. In the final at the Crystal Palace (now the National Sports Centre) Bristol City lost to Manchester United 1–0. After a five-season stay in the top flight, despite winning 1–0 at Newcastle at the start of the 1910–11 campaign, failure to beat Everton in the season's finale brought City's first-ever taste of relegation and it was to be 65 years before top-flight status would be regained.

Bristol City would then go on to stay in Division 2 until three years after the First World War had ended, and in that time they reached the semi-finals of the 1919–20 FA Cup before being beaten 2–1 by Huddersfield Town and finished third in the Second Division in the 1920–21 season. However, in the next season they were relegated to the Third Division South.

=== The yo-yo era (1922–65) ===
Chart of yearly table positions of Bristol City in the Football League

The 1920s were a rocky time as City bounced between the Second Division and the Southern Section of the Third Division. The season after City were relegated, they achieved promotion back to the Second Division, before being relegated back to the Southern Section of the Third Division again the following season. After successive high finishes in the league, they were promoted again in 1926–27. However, by the 1930s they had slumped into the lower division and stayed that way until over 10 years after the Second World War. During this stay in the Third Division South, they won the Welsh Cup in 1934, beating Tranmere Rovers in the final. However, in the same year they also suffered their biggest ever league defeat, a 9–0 loss to Coventry City The 1937–38 season was the most successful season for City since they were relegated to the Third Division, coming second in the league and reaching the final of the Third Division South Cup, before losing 6–2 to Reading on aggregate. They then came eighth in the Third Division South in the final full season before the war, in which the Grandstand of Ashton Gate was destroyed by a German air raid.

In 1946–47, City recorded a record league win by beating Aldershot 9–0, although despite Don Clark scoring 36 goals in the League, City failed to get promoted that season. Harry Dolman became chairman in 1949, a post he would hold for over 30 years. An engineer who had bought out the firm he worked for, he designed the first set of floodlights installed at Ashton Gate in the early 1950s. The late 1950s were a better time for City, with a five-year stay in the Second Division, a league they returned to for a further spell in 1965.

=== Back among the elite (1966–80) ===
In 1967, Alan Dicks was appointed manager, and things gradually began to improve, with promotion to the First Division in 1976, ending a 65-year exile from the top flight.

Between 1975 and 1981 City were regular participants in the Anglo-Scottish Cup, winning the trophy in 1977–78, beating Hibernian in the semi-finals, and winning 3–2 on aggregate in the final against St Mirren (managed at the time by a relatively new manager, Alex Ferguson). St Mirren had their revenge two seasons later, with an aggregate 5–1 victory over City to become the only Scottish team to win the trophy.

City's second stint in the top flight was less successful than the club's first, with thirteenth position in 1979 being their highest finish during this era. Stars of this era included Peter Cormack, Geoff Merrick, Tom Ritchie, Clive Whitehead, Gerry Gow, Trevor Tainton and Jimmy Mann.

=== Financial difficulties and revival (1980–2000) ===
In 1980, the City team went back to the Second Division in the first of three relegations, their debt mounted and their financial losses increased, with two successive relegations following. Thus, in 1982, they fell into the Fourth Division, and were declared bankrupt. A new club was formed and BCFC (1982) Ltd acquired the club's player contracts. The highly paid senior players Julian Marshall, Chris Garland, Jimmy Mann, Peter Aitken, Geoff Merrick, David Rodgers, Gerry Sweeney and Trevor Tainton, who became known as the 'Ashton Gate Eight', each accepted termination of his contract for half the amount due. The club's previous owners had failed to pay its debts to many local businesses. The resulting ill will towards the club made it difficult for the new owners to obtain credit.

City spent two seasons in the Fourth Division before winning promotion under Terry Cooper in 1984. They consolidated themselves in the Third Division during the latter part of the 1980s, and in 1990 Cooper's successor Joe Jordan achieved promotion as Third Division runners-up to local rivals Bristol Rovers.

There was a tragedy for the club, however, in that promotion campaign. In March 1990, two months before the club sealed promotion, striker Dean Horrix was killed in a car crash barely two weeks after joining the club, and having played three league games for them.

Jordan moved to Heart of Midlothian in September 1990, and his successor Jimmy Lumsden remained in charge for 18 months before making way for Denis Smith. Smith's first signing was the 20-year-old Arsenal striker Andy Cole. He was sold to Newcastle United in February 1993 and later played for Manchester United, where he collected five Premier League titles, two FA Cups and the European Cup.

Meanwhile, City remained in the new Division One (no longer the Second Division after the creation of the Premier League in 1992) and Smith moved to Oxford United in November 1993. His successor was Russell Osman. In January 1994 Osman led City to a shock 1–0 victory over Liverpool at Anfield in a third round replay in the FA Cup, a result that would cause the Liverpool manager at the time, Graeme Souness, to resign. Osman was sacked within a year of taking charge.

Joe Jordan was brought back to Ashton Gate in September 1994, but was unable to prevent relegation to Division Two.

Jordan remained at the helm for two seasons after City's relegation, but left in March 1997 after failing to get them back into Division One. Former Bristol Rovers manager John Ward took over, and achieved promotion in 1998 as Division Two runners-up. But City struggled back in Division One, and Ward stepped down in October 1998 to be succeeded by Benny Lennartsson, their first non-British manager. City were relegated in bottom place and Lennartsson was dismissed in favour of Gillingham's Tony Pulis, who lasted six months before leaving to take over at Portsmouth. During his time at Ashton Gate he was manager of perhaps the worst City side since the one that completed a hat-trick of successive relegations almost 20 years earlier.

Coach Tony Fawthrop took over until the end of the season, when Danny Wilson was appointed. Wilson was arguably the most prominent manager to take charge of a City side since Denis Smith, as he had guided Barnsley to promotion to the Premier League in 1997 and Sheffield Wednesday to a 12th-place finish in 1999.

=== 21st century ===
In the early 2000s Bristol City were regular Division Two play-off contenders during Wilson's spell as manager. They just missed out on the play-offs in 2002, finishing 7th. The following year, Wilson almost took them to automatic promotion, finishing 3rd and winning the Football League Trophy in Cardiff in 2003. The taste of the play-offs was bitter though, losing to rivals Cardiff City 1–0 on aggregate in the semi-final. In 2004, they finished in 3rd place again, and this time they reached the play-off final, but lost to Brighton & Hove Albion. He was sacked within days and replaced by veteran player Brian Tinnion.

City just failed to make the play-offs in Tinnion's first season as manager, finishing seventh, and he stepped down in September 2005 after a poor start to the season. Yeovil Town manager Gary Johnson was recruited as his successor in September 2005. Johnson led Bristol City to a 9th-place finish.

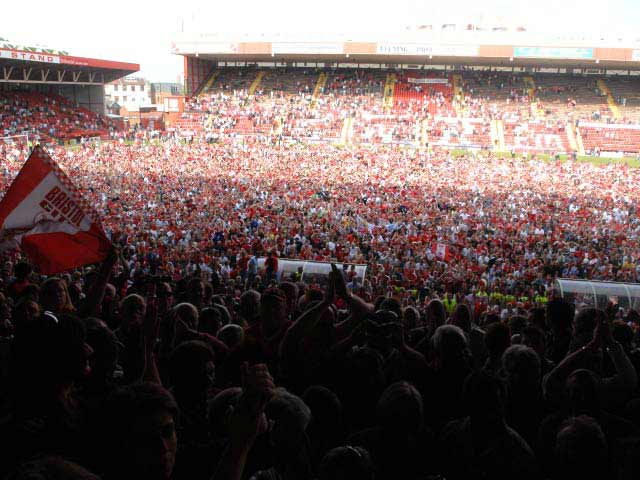
Pitch invasion at Ashton Gate after securing promotion in 2007

In the 2006–07 season, Bristol City finally achieved the elusive promotion that had evaded them in their 8 years in the third tier. Promotion to the Championship was confirmed on the final day of the season with a 3–1 win against already relegated Rotherham United, securing the runners-up place in the division and resulting in automatic promotion.

After a good start in the Championship, City established themselves as real contenders, sitting in 3rd place at Christmas. By the start of March, City were top of the Championship, making an improbable second successive promotion a possibility. However, a poor run ended City's chances of an automatic promotion place but qualified for the play-offs with a 4th-place finish, their highest finish since 1980. City overcame Crystal Palace 4–2 on aggregate to progress to the play-off final at Wembley Stadium, where they were beaten 1–0 by Hull City.

After a poor start in the first half of the 2008–09 season, City recovered after Christmas, peaking at 4th place in late February. After a lot of draws, the season eventually petered out and City finished the season in tenth place. The 2009–10 season saw some good results in the autumn, but heavy defeats by local rivals Cardiff City (0–6) and Doncaster Rovers (2–5) in early 2010 led to much dissatisfaction amongst fans, and Johnson left the club on 18 March 2010. Assistant manager Keith Millen took charge as caretaker manager, and led a series of good results, resulting in a second successive tenth-place finish.

Steve Coppell became manager in 2010 but resigned after just two matches. Longtime assistant manager Keith Millen was announced as Coppell's successor and City fell to a 15th-place finish in 2010–11. After a poor start to the 2011–12 season, Millen left the club in October 2011.

Derek McInnes was appointed next, but after a promising start, City fell into the relegation zone, eventually surviving in 20th place, their worst since promotion in 2007. This steady decline would continue and after a poor start to the 2012–13 season, McInnes was sacked in January 2013 with City bottom of the Championship. He was replaced by Sean O'Driscoll, the club's fifth head coach in three years, but City were relegated to League One after six seasons in the Championship. O'Driscoll left with the team 22nd in League One.

Steve Cotterill joined the club when Bristol City were second bottom of League One. Cotterill guided the club to a 12th-place finish. Bristol City were promoted back to the Championship after securing the League One title in 2014–15, their first league title since 1955. In their last home game, against Walsall, they finished the season with an 8–2 win. Bristol City finished the season with 99 points, the most points in a single season in the club's history, and 5 losses. In the same season, they also won the Football League Trophy after a win over Walsall, which finished 2–0 and their third league trophy, a record held by the club for having the most wins in that competition.

Despite huge success in the previous season, the club struggled on their return to the second tier. Steve Cotterill was relieved of his duties in January 2016 after a poor run of form which had seen Bristol City slip to 22nd in the Championship table. Lee Johnson, former player and son of former manager, Gary Johnson, was appointed as Bristol City's new head coach on 6 February 2016. Bristol City eventually finished in 18th place.

In the 2016–17 season, City were only just able to accumulate enough points to ensure survival at the end of the season. Lee Johnson remained at the helm for the following season, again making a positive early start. At the midpoint of the season, after 24 league games, they sat second in the Championship, whilst also knocking out Premier League opposition in Watford, Stoke City, Crystal Palace and Manchester United to reach the semi-finals of the League Cup. However, City would eventually finish in 11th place.

Bristol City ended the 2018–19 season in 8th. The battle for the last play-off spot came down to the final day, before Derby County managed to win their final game and clinch it. From March to June, the 2019–20 season was suspended due to the COVID-19 pandemic. Despite again challenging for the play-offs during the season, Johnson was sacked on 4 July 2020 after a run of just one win in 10 league matches. His long-time assistant, Dean Holden, was appointed as his replacement on 10 August 2020. After suffering six straight defeats in all competitions, Holden was dismissed on 16 February 2021 after just six months in charge. He was replaced by Nigel Pearson.

On 29 October 2023, Pearson was sacked with Bristol City 15th in the Championship following a run of 5 losses in 7 games. Despite the poor form, Pearson had overseen year on year points increases in his time at the club and many fans felt he had been undermined by a loss of key players such as Alex Scott and a lack of reinvestment in the playing squad. On 7 November 2023, Liam Manning was appointed as the new head coach of Bristol City, joining from Oxford United.

City ended the 2023–24 season in 11th place with 62 points, having also enjoyed some success in the FA Cup by knocking out West Ham in January after forcing a replay. In the 2024–25 season the club reached the play-offs for the first time in 17 years. This was largely due to strong home form, with City losing only three home games during the season. City went on to lose 6–0 on aggregate to Sheffield United in the play-off semi-final.

On 3 June 2025 it was announced that Manning would leave the club to manage Norwich City. On 19 June 2025 Gerhard Struber was appointed as the new head coach of Bristol City.

== Club identity ==
Bristol City have played in red and white since the 1890s, occasionally also including black. The away kit is more variable. It is traditionally white, but has also featured black or yellow. Other colours featured have included green and a purple and lime combination, the latter of which has become a fan favourite.

- The club's current crest is a modernised version of the Robin which has long ties to the fans and the club.
- The club's previous crest was a simplified version of the coat of arms of the city of Bristol.
- The club's mascots are Red and Robyn, replacing Scrumpy the robin who had been the club's mascot from 2005 until 2022.
- The club has a long association with West Country band The Wurzels: "One for the Bristol City", written for the club in 1976, is the run-out song at Ashton Gate, while their 1960s hit "Drink Up Thy Zider" is played after home wins.

About halfway through the 2007–08 season Bristol City manager Gary Johnson said in an interview that he hoped the team could get the whole ground bouncing. City supporters took this rallying cry on board and began to sing "Johnson says bounce around the ground" to the tune of Yellow Submarine, while continually bouncing up and down. The first game at which it was sung was in an away match against Southampton at St Mary's Stadium, and it was also sung at away at Queen's Park Rangers in February. When Bristol City fans travelled to London to play Charlton Athletic on 4 March 2008, the visiting fans, using the rail network to return home, adapted the song to "Bounce Around the Train". Since then, it has become an often used chant at Ashton Gate stadium by the fans. It was also sometimes used by supporters of Gary Johnson's former side Northampton Town, primarily at away matches. When Gary Johnson's son, Lee Johnson returned to his former club in 2016 as their new manager, he stated that he wished to inherit the chant and keep the fans singing it.

=== Shirt sponsors ===
Period	Kit supplier	Kit sponsor
1976–1981	Umbro	None
1981–1982	Coffer Sports	Park Furnishers
Feb 1982	Coffer Sports	Hire-Rite
1982–1983	Lynx	Hire-Rite
Aug–Dec 1983	Umbro	Hire-Rite
Dec 1983–1990	Bukta	Hire-Rite
1990–1992	Bukta	Thorn Security
1992–1993	Nibor	Thorn Security
1993–1994	Nibor	Dry Blackthorn Cider
1994–1996	Nibor	Auto Windscreens
1996–1998	Lotto	Sanderson
1998–1999	Uhlsport	Sanderson
1999–2000	Uhlsport	DAS
2000–2002	Admiral	DAS
2002–2005	TFG Sports	DAS
2005–2006	TFG Sports	Bristol Trade Centre
2006–2008	Puma	Bristol Trade Centre
2008–2010	Puma	DAS
2010–2011	Adidas	DAS
2011–2012	Adidas	RSG (Home); Bristol City Community Trust (Away)
2012–2014	Adidas	Blackthorn
2014–2016	Bristol Sport	RSG
2016–2018	Bristol Sport	Lancer Scott
2018–2020	Bristol Sport	Dunder
2020–2022	Hummel	MansionBet
2022–2023	Hummel	Huboo Digital NRG
2023–present	O'Neills	Huboo Digital NRG

== Stadium ==
Bristol City have played at Ashton Gate Stadium in the south-west of Bristol, just south of the River Avon, since moving from St John's Lane in 1904. The ground currently has an all-seated capacity of 27,000. It was the home of Bedminster until the 1900 merger, and the merged team played some games there the following season, but it did not become the permanent home of Bristol City until 1904.

In the past plans were considered for expansion work to be carried out at Ashton Gate. There were also proposals to build a new 36,000-seat stadium at Hengrove Park. This was turned down in a local referendum in December 2000. In 2002, the local council was looking at possible sites for a new 40,000-seat stadium which would house both City, Rovers and Bristol Rugby, but these plans were scrapped and it is widely accepted that this would not have been welcomed by the majority of supporters from all clubs. Ashton Gate's current capacity is an average size for Championship grounds; however, in November 2007 the club announced plans to relocate to a new 30,000-capacity stadium in Ashton Vale. Plans were also in place to increase capacity to 42,000 had England's 2018 World Cup bid been successful.

The South stand opened for the 2015–16 season, with the existing Williams stand being demolished and replaced by the Lansdown stand in 2016. A new partly-artificial Desso pitch was laid and the current Dolman stand refurbished. A safe standing area was added to the south-east corner of the ground (roughly analogous to the old East End) in 2021.

A state-of-the-art training facility became operational in 2020. The Robins High Performance Centre is at Failand a short distance from Ashton Gate Stadium.

=== Gallery ===
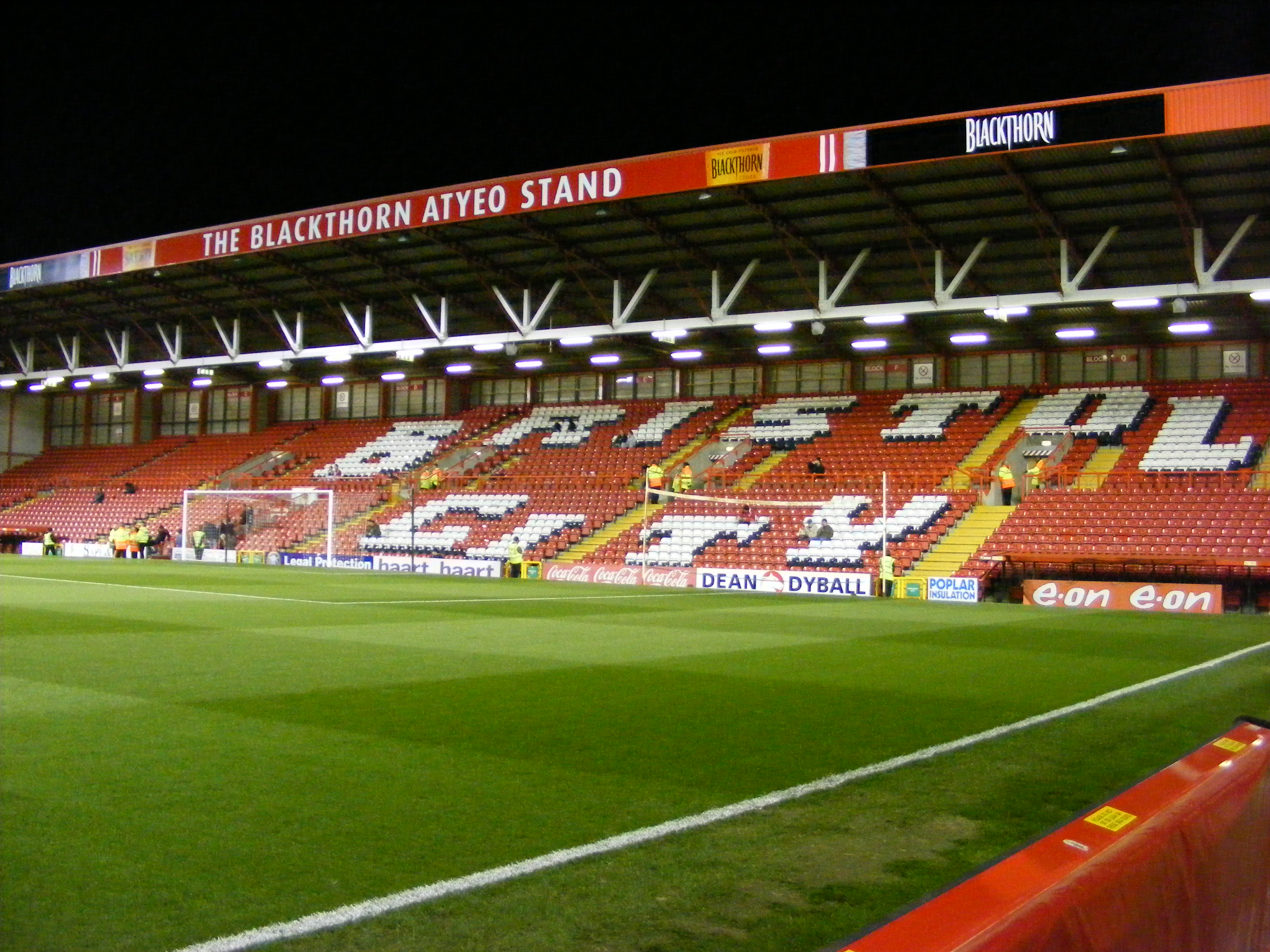
Atyeo Stand

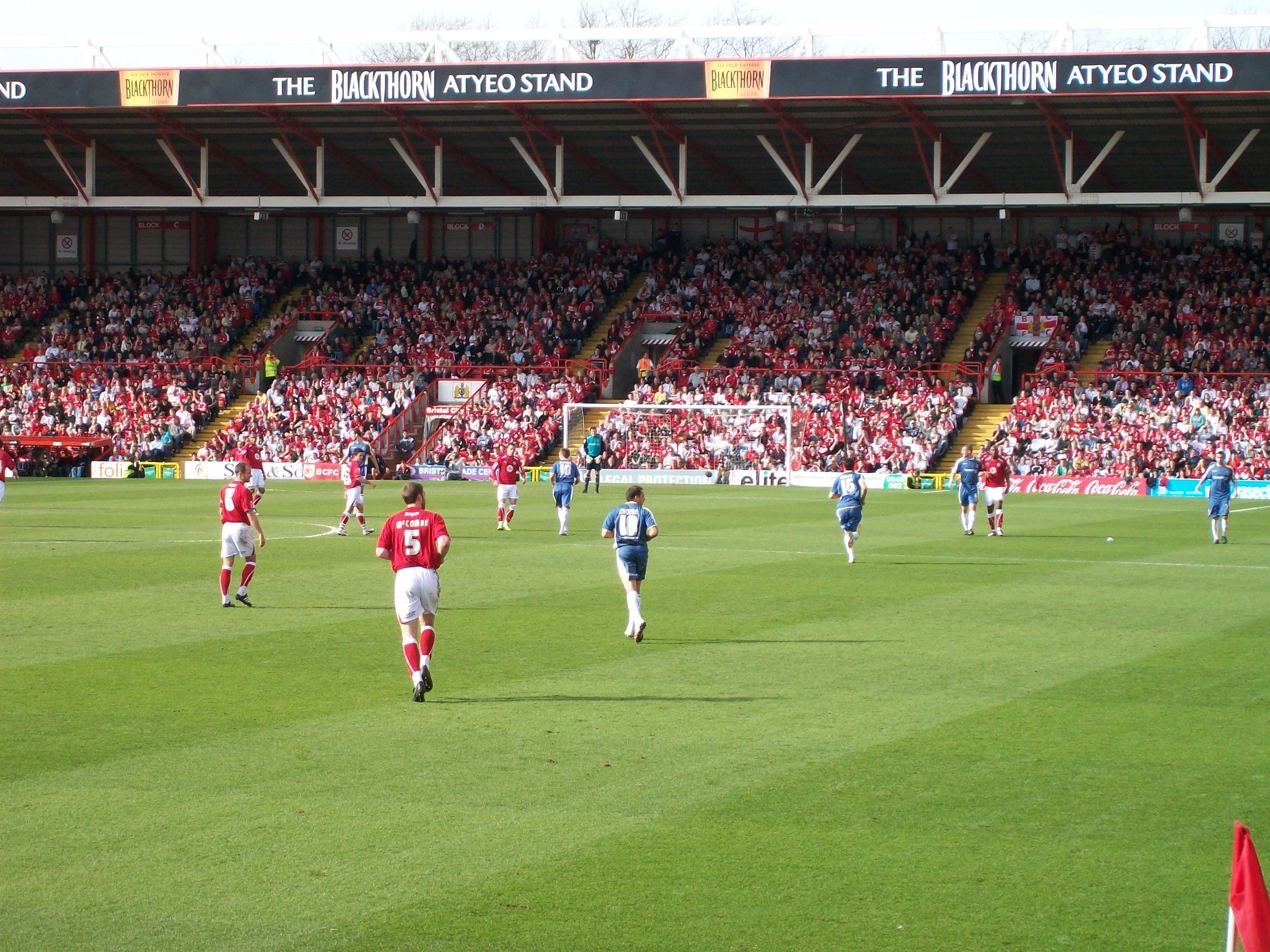
Bristol City v. Cardiff City – 15 March 2009

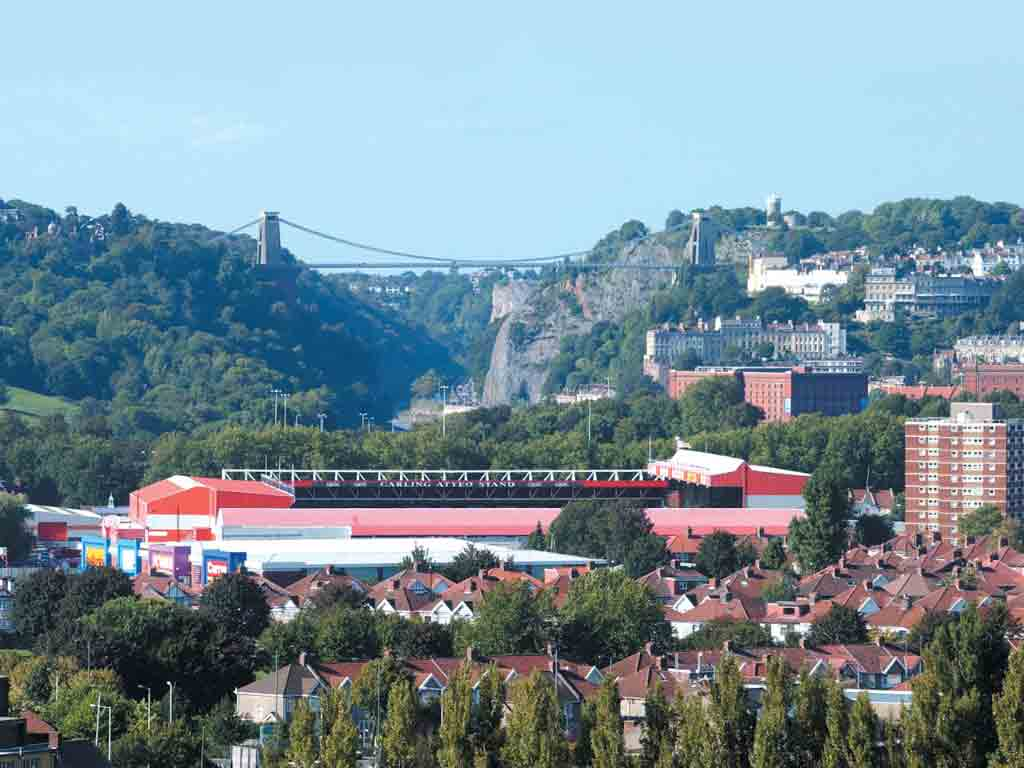
Ashton Gate with Clifton Suspension Bridge in the background

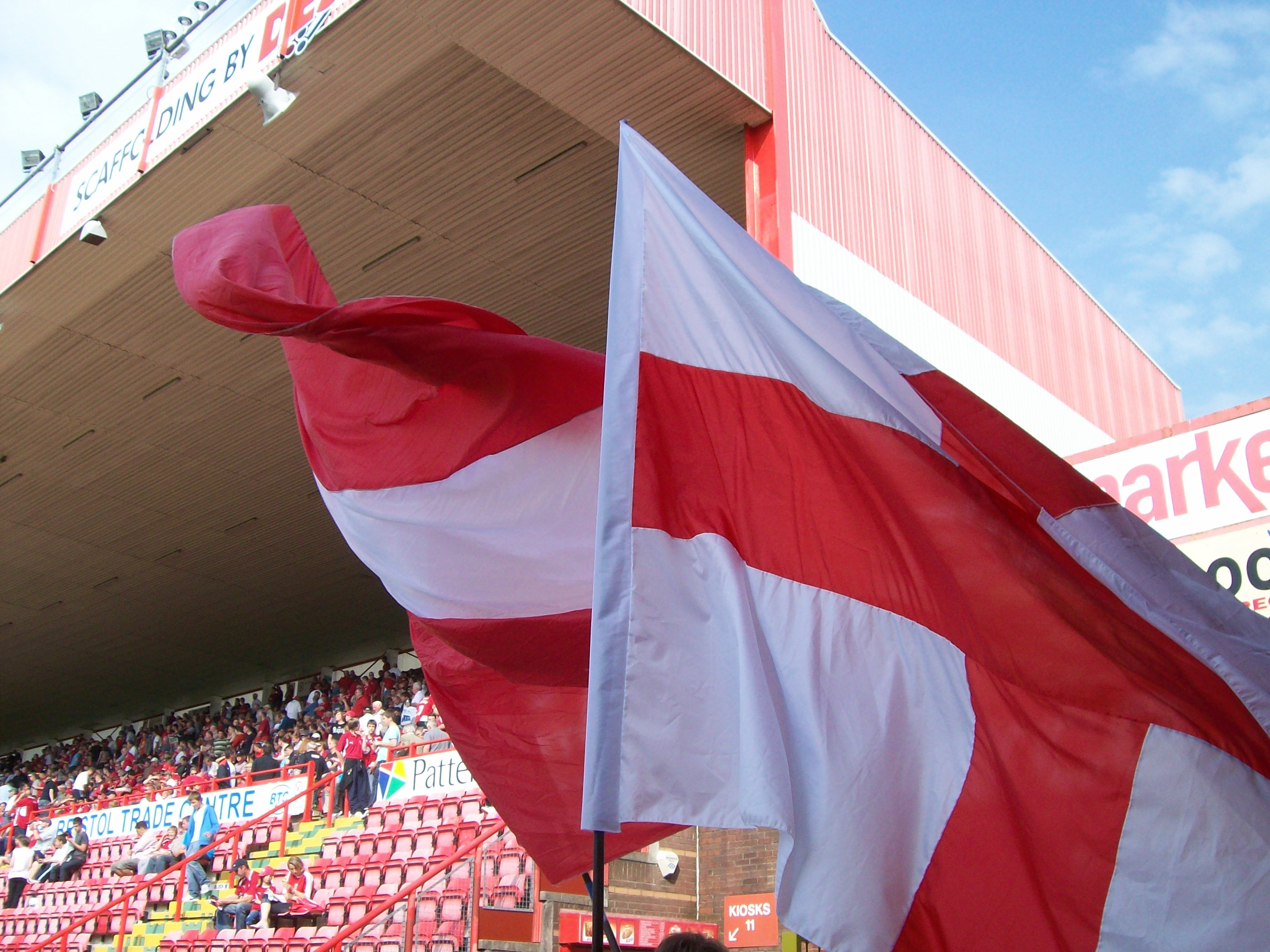
An example of the flags used by the "Ultras" in the Wedlock Stand (The Eastend)

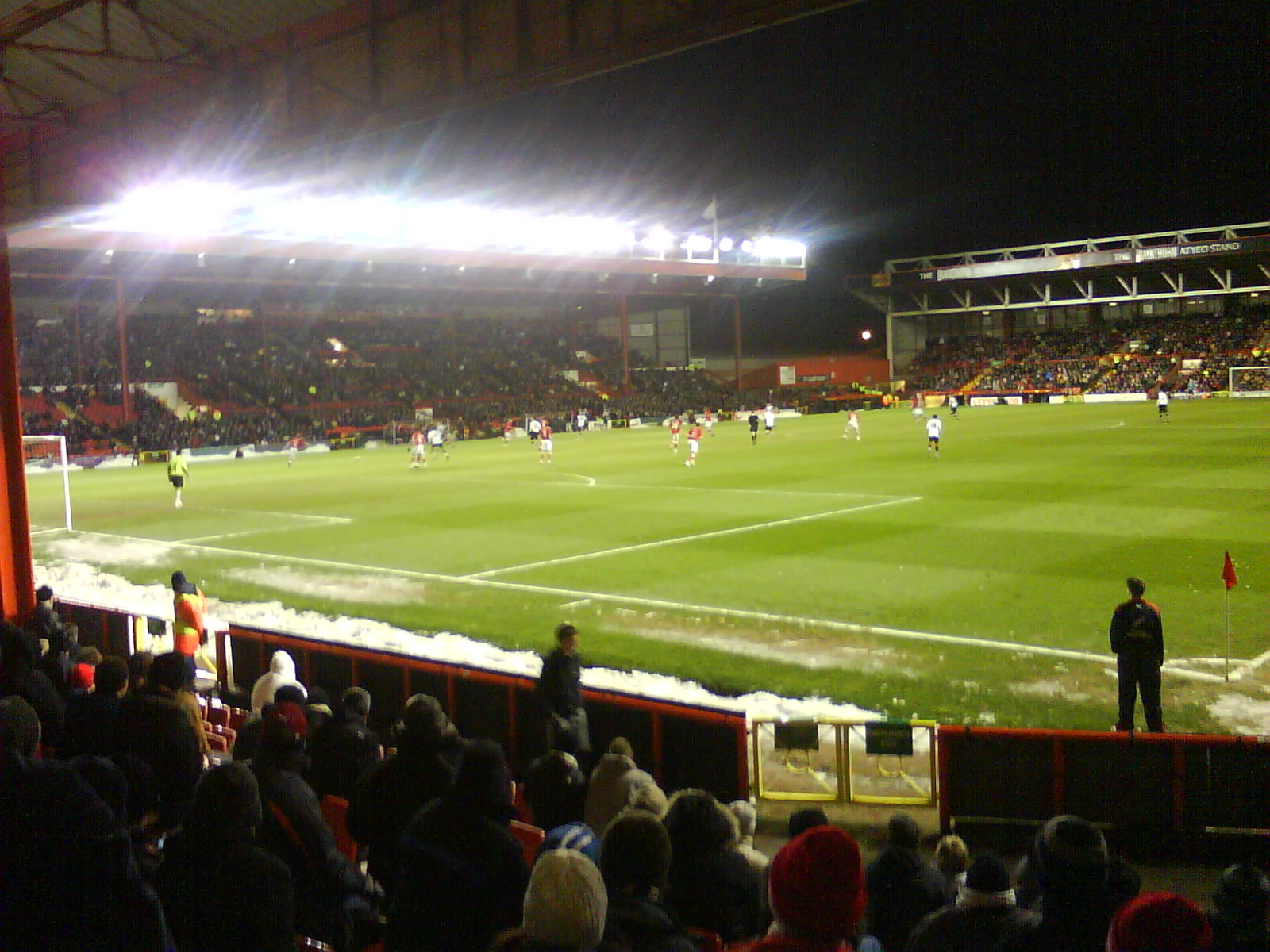
View from the home section of the Wedlock Stand

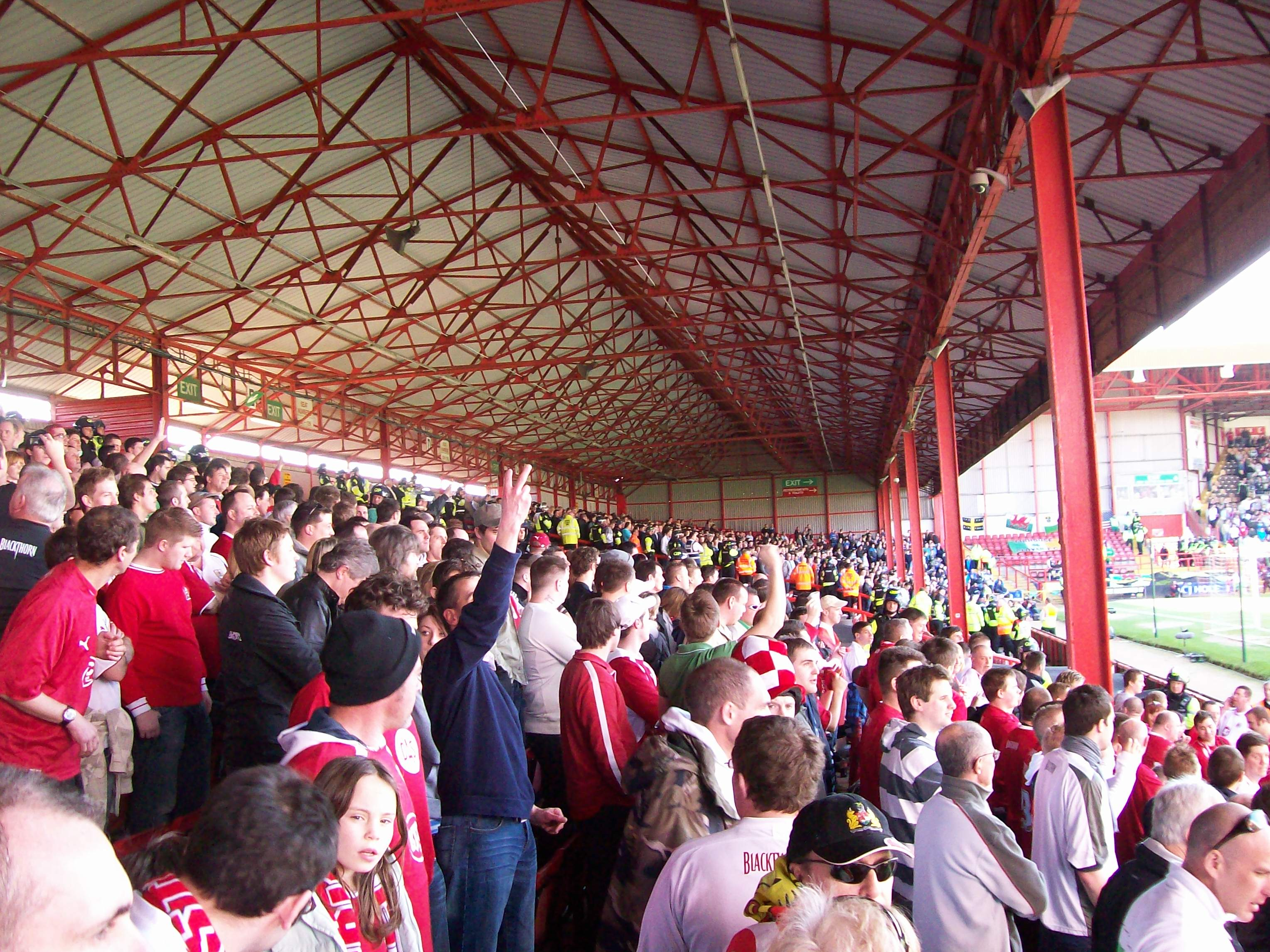
Inside the Wedlock Stand against fierce rivals, Cardiff City

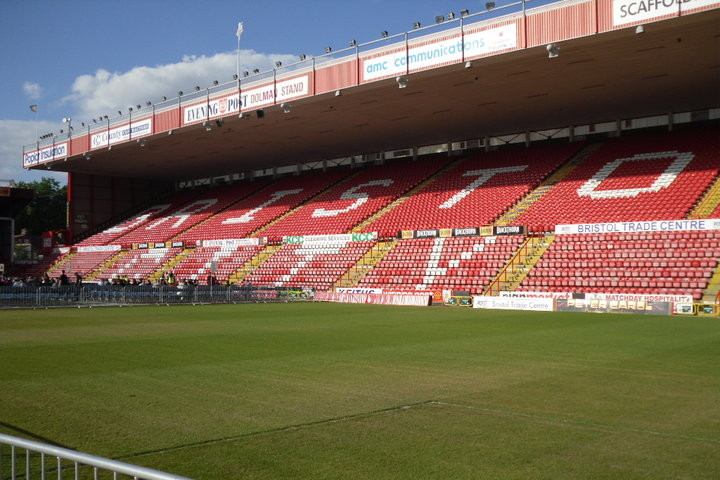
The ground lying empty prior to hosting a concert.

== Rivalries ==
Bristol City's traditional rivals are Bristol Rovers. The clubs have met 105 times, with the first meeting in 1897. Bristol City have the most wins on 43. However, the clubs have not been in the same league for a number of years; they were last in the same division in the 2000–01 season. Since then, they have only met three times; in the two-legged southern final of the 2006–07 Football League Trophy, which Rovers won 1–0 on aggregate, and in the first round of the 2013–14 Johnstone's Paint Trophy, which City won 2–1 at Ashton Gate.

City's other main rivals are Cardiff City, who play in nearby Cardiff. Despite being a local derby, it crosses the Wales–England border, making it one of the few international club derbies in the United Kingdom. The two clubs have been at similar levels in recent years, being in the same division for 15 of the last 18 seasons. This has meant frequent meetings in the league including in the semi-finals of the 2003 Second Division play-offs.

Other clubs have been seen as 'third rivals' by the fans and media. Swindon Town are seen by many as rivals, nicknamed 'Swindle' by City fans. This rivalry was most recently relevant in the 2014–15 season, when the two clubs were rivals for promotion to the Championship. Plymouth Argyle have also previously been considered rivals despite a distance of over 100 miles. The rivalry was especially relevant in the 2000s when the two clubs were the highest-ranking West Country clubs for a number of years, and meetings were seen as a decider of the 'Best in the West'. Swansea City, Newport County, Cheltenham Town and even Yeovil Town have previously been mentioned as rivals, but very rarely. However, during a fixture between Bristol City and Swansea City on 2 February 2019 at Ashton Gate, fighting took place between Bristol City and Swansea City fans resulting in a rivalry flaring up between the two sets of fans.

== Records and statistics ==
- Record League victory – 9–0 vs. Aldershot (28 December 1946)
- Record FA Cup victory – 11–0 vs. Chichester City (5 November 1960)
- Record League defeat – 9–0 vs. Coventry City (28 April 1934)
- Highest attendance – 43,335 vs. Preston North End (16 February 1935)
- Highest attendance (at any ground) – 86,703 vs. Hull City Championship play-off final – Wembley Stadium – (24 May 2008)
- Most League appearances – 596, John Atyeo (1951–66)
- Most League goals scored – 314, John Atyeo (1951–66)
- Most goals scored (overall) – 351, John Atyeo (1951–66)
- Most capped player – Billy Wedlock, 26 caps, England
- Most goals scored in a season – 36, Don Clark (1946–47)
- Record transfer fee paid – £8 million to Chelsea for Tomáš Kalas (July 2019)
- Record transfer fee received – £25 million from Bournemouth for Alex Scott (August 2023)
- Record sequence of League wins – 14; 9 September 1905 – 2 December 1905 – This was a joint league record until 2017.
- Record sequence of League defeats – 8; 10 December 2016 – 21 January 2017
- Record sequence of unbeaten League matches – 24; 9 September 1905 – 10 February 1906
- Record sequence without a League win – 21; 16 March 2013 – 22 October 2013
- Record points total for a Season – 99pts; 2014–15 Football League One

=== League history ===
Note: The numbers in parentheses are the level of football for that season.

- 1897–1901: Southern League Division One (3)
- 1901–1906: Football League Second Division (2)
- 1906–1911: Football League First Division (1)
- 1911–1922: Football League Second Division (2)
- 1922–1923: Football League Third Division (3)
- 1923–1924: Football League Second Division (2)
- 1924–1927: Football League Third Division (3)
- 1927–1932: Football League Second Division (2)
- 1932–1955: Football League Third Division (3)
- 1955–1960: Football League Second Division (2)
- 1960–1965: Football League Third Division (3)
- 1965–1976: Football League Second Division (2)
- 1976–1980: Football League First Division (1)
- 1980–1981: Football League Second Division (2)
- 1981–1982: Football League Third Division (3)
- 1982–1984: Football League Fourth Division (4)
- 1984–1990: Football League Third Division (3)
- 1990–1995: Football League Second Division / Football League First Division (rebranding after the Premier League came into existence) (2)
- 1995–1998: Football League Second Division (3)
- 1998–1999: Football League First Division (2)
- 1999–2007: Football League Second Division / Football League One (rebranded) (3)
- 2007–2013: Football League Championship (2)
- 2013–2015: Football League One (3)
- 2015–present: Football League/EFL Championship (2)

=== Most appearances ===
#	Name	Career	Appearances
1	(England) Louis Carey	1995–2004; 2005–2014	646
2	(England) John Atyeo	1951–1966	645
3	(England) Trevor Tainton	1967–1982	581
4	(England) Brian Tinnion	1993–2005	551
5	(Scotland) Tom Ritchie	1972–1981; 1983–1985	504
6	(Scotland) Gerry Sweeney	1971–1981	490
7	(England) Rob Newman	1981–1991	483
8	(Scotland) Gerry Gow	1969–1981	445
9	(England) Geoff Merrick	1967–1982	433
10	(Scotland) Scott Murray	1997–2003; 2004–2009	427

Most club appearances including substitute appearances in all competitions (excluding Gloucestershire Cup). Updated 29 December 2013. Note: On 29 December 2013, Louis Carey broke Bristol City's appearance record when he came on as a substitute in the 4–1 win over Stevenage. He overtook John Atyeo after 47 years and is now the club's all-time top appearance maker.

=== Most goals ===
#	Name	Career	Goals
1	(England) John Atyeo	1951–1966	351
2	(Scotland) Tom Ritchie	1969–1981, 1982–1984	132
3	(England) Arnold Rodgers	1949–1956	111
4	(England) Jimmy Rogers	1950–1956, 1958–1962	108
5	(England) Alan Walsh	1984–1989	99
6	(Scotland) Scott Murray	1997–2003, 2004–2009	91
7	(England) Tot Walsh	1924–1928	91
8	(England) John Galley	1967–1972	90
9	(England) Brian Clark	1960–1966	89
10	(Scotland) Sam Gilligan	1904–1910	87

Correct as of 29 July 2018.

== Players ==
=== First-team squad ===
As of 3 September 2026

Note: Flags indicate national team as defined under FIFA eligibility rules; some limited exceptions apply. Players may hold more than one non-FIFA nationality.

No.	Pos.	Nation	Player
1	GK	ENG	Sam Tickle
2	DF	ROU	Lisav Eissat
3	DF	ENG	Cameron Pring
4	MF	ENG	Adam Randell
5	DF	ENG	Robert Atkinson
6	MF	BEL	Brian De Keersmaecker (on loan from Oxford United)
7	FW	JPN	Yū Hirakawa
8	MF	ENG	Joe Williams
9	FW	SUI	Lorent Tolaj
10	MF	ENG	Scott Twine
11	FW	ENG	Sam Bell
12	MF	IRL	Jason Knight (captain)
14	MF	SLO	Tomi Horvat
15	DF	IRL	Luke McNally
16	DF	ENG	Rob Dickie

No.	Pos.	Nation	Player
17	MF	ENG	Jed Wallace
19	DF	ENG	George Tanner
20	MF	ENG	Sam Greenwood
21	DF	TTO	Rio Cardines (on loan from Crystal Palace)
23	FW	ENG	Dom Ballard
24	DF	ENG	Seb Naylor
27	MF	NED	Gibson Yah
29	MF	ENG	Leo Pecover
31	DF	ENG	Elijah Morrison
32	GK	WAL	Lewis Thomas
38	DF	SWE	Noah Eile
40	GK	ENG	Bradley Collins
42	MF	ITA	Daniel Ezendu
45	FW	ENG	Elijah Adebayo

=== Out on loan ===
Note: Flags indicate national team as defined under FIFA eligibility rules; some limited exceptions apply. Players may hold more than one non-FIFA nationality.

No.	Pos.	Nation	Player
22	DF	CAN	Jamie Knight-Lebel (on loan at Motherwell until 30 June 2027)
26	MF	ENG	Josh Stokes (on loan at Reading until 30 June 2027)
28	MF	IRL	Adam Murphy (on loan at Fleetwood Town until 2 January 2027)
35	MF	ENG	Louie Derrick (on loan at Weston-super-Mare until 6 September 2026)
39	GK	ENG	Freddie Godden (on loan at Taunton Town until 30 June 2027)
—	GK	WAL	Joe Duncan (on loan at Southend United until 30 June 2027)
—	DF	ENG	Jack Hooper (on loan at Cardiff Met until 31 May 2027)

=== Under 21 squad ===
As of 4 September 2026

Note: Flags indicate national team as defined under FIFA eligibility rules; some limited exceptions apply. Players may hold more than one non-FIFA nationality.

No.	Pos.	Nation	Player
25	FW	ITA	Ephraim Yeboah
30	DF	ENG	Marley Thelwell
33	DF	ENG	Josh Campbell-Slowey
43	FW	ENG	Luke Skinner
48	MF	ENG	Ranel Young
—	GK	NZL	Josey Casa-Grande
—	GK	ENG	Isaac Finch
—	GK	ENG	Jack Witchard
—	DF	ENG	Taine Anderson
—	DF	WAL	Tomos Gibbs

No.	Pos.	Nation	Player
—	MF	ENG	Charlie Filer
—	MF	ENG	Harry Hogg
—	MF	WAL	Zac King-Phillips
—	MF	IRL	Rhys Knight
—	MF	ENG	Raekwan Nelson
—	MF	WAL	Ruebin Sheppard
—	FW	ENG	Excellent Ikpeama
—	FW	ENG	Victor Akinbo
—	FW	ENG	Jack Griffin-Pacheco
—	FW	IRL	Billy O'Neill

=== Notable players ===
Former players

For a list of all Bristol City players with a Wikipedia article, see Category:Bristol City F.C. players. Bedminster merged with Bristol City in 1900; for a further list of all Bedminster players with articles see Category:Bedminster F.C. players.

==== Player of the Year ====
Year	Winner	Po.	Ref.
1970–71	(England) Gerry Sharpe	FW	
1971–72	(England) Geoff Merrick	DF	
1972–73	(Wales) John Emanuel	MF	
1973–74	(Scotland) Gerry Gow	MF	
1974–75	(England) Gary Collier	DF	
1975–76	(United Kingdom) The whole squad		
1976–77	(England) Norman Hunter	DF	
1977–78	(England) Norman Hunter	DF	
1978–79	(Scotland) Gerry Gow	MF	
1979–80	(England) Geoff Merrick	DF	
1980–81	(England) Kevin Mabbutt	FW	
1981–82	No award		
1982–83	(England) Glyn Riley	FW	
1983–84	(Wales) Howard Pritchard	MF	
1984–85	(England) Alan Walsh	FW	
1985–86	(Scotland) Bobby Hutchinson	MF	
1986–87	(England) Rob Newman	DF	
1987–88	(England) Alan Walsh	FW	
1988–89	(England) Keith Waugh	GK	
1989–90	(England) Bob Taylor	FW	
1990–91	(England) Andy Llewellyn	DF	
1991–92	(England) Martin Scott	DF	
1992–93	(England) Andy Cole	FW	
1993–94	(England) Wayne Allison	FW	
1994–95	(England) Matt Bryant	DF	
1995–96	(England) Martin Kuhl	MF	
1996–97	(England) Shaun Taylor	DF	
1997–98	(England) Shaun Taylor	DF	
1998–99	(Nigeria) Ade Akinbiyi	FW	
1999–2000	(England) Billy Mercer	GK	
2000–01	(England) Brian Tinnion	MF	
2001–02	(England) Matt Hill	DF	
2002–03	(Scotland) Scott Murray	MF	
2003–04	(Northern Ireland) Tommy Doherty	MF	
2004–05	(England) Leroy Lita	FW	
2005–06	(England) Steve Brooker	FW	
2006–07	(England) Jamie McCombe	DF	
2007–08	(Brazil) Adriano Basso	GK	
2008–09	(Nigeria) Dele Adebola	FW	
2009–10	(England) Cole Skuse	MF	
2010–11	(Ghana) Albert Adomah	MF	
2011–12	(England) Jon Stead	FW	
2012–13	(England) Tom Heaton	GK	
2013–14	(England) Sam Baldock	FW	
2014–15	(England) Aden Flint	DF	
2015–16	(England) Aden Flint	DF	
2016–17	(England) Tammy Abraham	FW	
2017–18	(England) Bobby Reid	FW	
2018–19	(England) Adam Webster	DF	
2019–20	(Senegal) Famara Diédhiou	FW	
2020–21	(England) Dan Bentley	GK	
2021–22	(Austria) Andreas Weimann	FW	
2022–23	(England) Alex Scott	MF	
2023–24	(England) Rob Dickie	DF	
2024–25	(Republic of Ireland) Jason Knight	MF	
2025–26	(Czech Republic) Radek Vítek	GK	

==== Top league scorer ====
Year	Winner	Goals
1996–97	(Bermuda) Shaun Goater	23
1997–98	(Bermuda) Shaun Goater	17
1998–99	(Nigeria) Ade Akinbiyi	19
1999–2000	(England) Tony Thorpe	13
2000–01	(England) Tony Thorpe	19
2001–02	(England) Tony Thorpe	16
2002–03	(Scotland) Scott Murray	19
2003–04	(England) Lee Peacock	14
2004–05	(England) Leroy Lita	24
2005–06	(England) Steve Brooker	16
2006–07	(England) Phil Jevons	11
2007–08	(Jamaica) Darren Byfield	8
2008–09	(England) Nicky Maynard	11
2009–10	(England) Nicky Maynard	20
2010–11	(Jersey) Brett Pitman	13
2011–12	(England) Nicky Maynard	8
2012–13	(England) Steve Davies	13
2013–14	(England) Sam Baldock	24
2014–15	(England) Aaron Wilbraham	18
2015–16	(Ivory Coast) Jonathan Kodjia	19
2016–17	(England) Tammy Abraham	23
2017–18	(England) Bobby Reid	19
2018–19	(Senegal) Famara Diédhiou	12
2019–20	(Senegal) Famara Diédhiou	11
2020–21	(Bermuda) Nahki Wells	9
2021–22	(Austria) Andreas Weimann	22
2022–23	(Bermuda) Nahki Wells	11
2023–24	(Scotland) Tommy Conway	9
2024–25	(Albania) Anis Mehmeti	12
2025–26	(England) Scott Twine	11

== Club officials ==
Staff

As of 29/05/2026

- Head coach: Michael Skubala
- Assistant head coach: Ian Burchnall
- First team coach: Alex Ball
- Goalkeeping Coach: Pat Mountain
- Head of Medical: Paul Tanner
- Head of Performance: Andy Kavanagh
- Head of Communications: Sheridan Robins
- Sporting Director: James Ellis

=== Managerial history ===
Name	Period
(England) Sam Hollis	1897–1899
(Scotland) Robert Campbell	1899–1901
(England) Sam Hollis	1901–1905
(England) Harry Thickitt	1905–1910
(England) Frank Bacon	1910–1911
(England) Sam Hollis	1911–1913
(England) George Hedley	1913–1917
(Scotland) Jock Hamilton	1917–1919
(England) Joe Palmer	1919–1921
(Scotland) Alex Raisbeck	1921–1929
(England) Joe Bradshaw	1929–1932
(England) Bob Hewison	1932–1949
(England) Bob Wright	1949–1950
(England) Pat Beasley	1950–1958
(Northern Ireland) Peter Doherty	1958–1960
(England) Fred Ford	1960–1967
(England) Alan Dicks	1967–1980
(England) Bobby Houghton	1980–1982
(England) Roy Hodgson	1982
(England) Terry Cooper	1982–1988
(Scotland) Joe Jordan	1988–1990
(Scotland) Jimmy Lumsden	1990–1992
(England) Denis Smith	1992–1993
(England) Russell Osman	1993–1994
(Scotland) Joe Jordan	1994–1997
(England) John Ward	1997–1998
(Sweden) Benny Lennartsson	1998–1999
(Wales) Tony Pulis	1999
(England) Tony Fawthrop	2000
(Northern Ireland) Danny Wilson	2000–2004
(England) Brian Tinnion	2004–2005
(England) Gary Johnson	2005–2010
(England) Steve Coppell	2010
(England) Keith Millen	2010–2011
(Scotland) Derek McInnes	2011–2013
(Republic of Ireland) Sean O'Driscoll	2013
(England) Steve Cotterill	2013–2016
(England) Lee Johnson	2016–2020
(England) Dean Holden	2020–2021
(England) Nigel Pearson	2021–2023
(England) Liam Manning	2023–2025
(Austria) Gerhard Struber	2025–2026
(England) Roy Hodgson	2026
(England) Michael Skubala	2026-

== Bristol City Women's ==
The women's team was formed in 1990 supported by the club's community officer, Shaun Parker. Their greatest achievement was reaching the semi-finals of the FA Women's Cup in 1994 and winning promotion to the Premier League under Manager Jack Edgar in 2004. Following the decision by the FA to fund only one centre of excellence in Bristol, the two senior teams were disbanded in June 2008 and the girls' youth side merged with the Bristol Academy W.F.C. The majority of the senior players, with coach Will Roberts, moved to the University of Bath in summer 2008 and now play as AFC TeamBath Ladies in the South West Combination Women's Football League.

== Honours ==
League

- First Division (level 1)
  - Runners-up: 1906–07
- Second Division (level 2)
  - Champions: 1905–06
  - 2nd place promotion: 1975–76
- Third Division South / Third Division / Second Division / League One (level 3)
  - Champions: 1922–23, 1926–27, 1954–55, 2014–15
  - 2nd place promotion: 1964–65, 1989–90, 1997–98, 2006–07
- Fourth Division (level 4)
  - 4th place promotion: 1983–84
- Western League
  - Champions: 1897–98

Cup

- FA Cup
  - Runners-up: 1908–09
- Associate Members' Cup / Football League Trophy
  - Winners: 1985–86, 2002–03, 2014–15
  - Runners-up: 1986–87, 1999–2000
- Welsh Cup
  - Winners: 1933–34
- Anglo-Scottish Cup
  - Winners: 1977–78

== See also ==
- Ruch Radzionków — a Polish football club with a similar identity, nicknamed Cidry.
