= Geoff Merrick =

English footballer

Personal information
- Date of birth: 29 April 1951 (age 75)
- Place of birth: Bristol, England
- Position: Central defender

Senior career*
Years	Team	Apps	(Gls)
1967–1982	Bristol City	367	(10)
- Caroline Hill
1983	Gloucester City	8	(0)
Total		375	(10)
- * Club domestic league appearances and goals

Geoff Merrick (born 29 April 1951) is an English former professional footballer who played as a central defender, making over 300 career appearances.

== Career ==
Born in Bristol, Merrick played for Bristol City and Caroline Hill in Hong Kong. A cultured defender, his best position was at centre-back, although he was also a capable full-back. Merrick was quick, good in the air and an exceptional reader of the game. These attributes led to at least two attempts from Arsenal to sign him, both of which were rejected by Bristol City. As captain, Merrick was central to Bristol City's promotion to the top flight of English football in 1976. Having been part of this modern high-point for the club, he was unable to arrest its subsequent decline as they endured a series of relegations. With financial difficulties accompanying the decline, Merrick became one of the legendary 'Ashton Gate Eight' who saved the club by ripping up their contracts and taking redundancy.
