= Trevor Tainton =

English footballer

Personal information
- Full name: Trevor Keith Tainton
- Date of birth: 8 June 1948 (age 78)
- Place of birth: Bristol, England
- Position: Midfielder

Senior career*
Years	Team	Apps	(Gls)
1965–1982	Bristol City	490	(24)
1982	Torquay United	19	(1)
1983	Trowbridge Town		
- * Club domestic league appearances and goals

Trevor Keith Tainton (born 8 June 1948) is a former footballer who played as a midfielder in the Football League between the 1960s and 1980s for Bristol City.

He was born in Bristol and first appeared in the league for Bristol City in the 1967–68 season and he went on to play 486 League games for the Ashton Gate side. He was a member of the successful promotion side of 1976, and went on to play for City in the First Division. He is third on City's all-time appearances list, playing in 581 matches.

During the 1981/82 season Tainton joined Torquay United, scoring one goal in 19 league appearances that season before moving to Trowbridge Town.

He is a member of Bristol City's Hall of Fame.

After retiring from football he worked as a security officer at the Oldbury Nuclear Power Station.
