= Bob Wright (Scottish footballer) =

Scottish footballer (1913–1998)

Personal information
- Full name: Robert Cooper Allen Wright
- Date of birth: 20 February 1913
- Place of birth: Glasgow, Scotland
- Date of death: 27 May 1998 (aged 85)
- Place of death: Great Missenden, England
- Position: Left half

Youth career
- Horden Colliery Welfare

Senior career*
Years	Team	Apps	(Gls)
1937–1947	Charlton Athletic	28	(0)

Managerial career
- 1947–1949: Charlton Athletic assistant manager
- 1949–1950: Bristol City manager
- 1951–1952: Bristol Rovers assistant manager
- * Club domestic league appearances and goals

Robert Cooper Allen Wright (20 February 1913 – 27 May 1998) was a Scottish footballer who played as a left half. He made over 20 Football League appearances in the years before the Second World War.

== Career ==
Wright played locally for Horden Colliery Welfare; he signed for Charlton Athletic in May 1937 for £100. He made 28 appearances for Charlton before the Second World War. Wright spent much of the war abroad but did make 47 wartime appearances for Charlton and 19 for Middlesbrough. Wright retired from playing in 1947.

Wright became assistant manager to Jimmy Seed at Charlton Athletic in September 1947. He was appointed Bristol City manager in April 1949. He complained that he was not given a free hand by the Bristol City board of directors and resigned in June 1950. He was a licensee in Bristol until joining Bristol Rovers as assistant manager to Bert Tann in July 1951 leaving that post again in July 1952. He became the licensee of the "White Hart" in Lower Maudlin Street, Bristol.
