= Sam Hollis =

English football trainer and manager

Personal information
- Full name: Samuel Woodroffe Hollis (né Moore)
- Date of birth: c. 1866
- Place of birth: Nottingham, England
- Date of death: 17 April 1942
- Place of death: Bristol, England

Managerial career
- Years: Team
- 1897–1899: Bristol City
- 1899–1900: Bedminster
- 1901–1905: Bristol City
- 1911–1913: Bristol City
- 1913–1917: Newport County

Sam Hollis (1866 – 17 April 1942) was an English football trainer and manager.

Born in Nottingham as Samuel Woodroffe Moore, he had comparatively little football experience, having previously worked in the local registry and as a landlord in a pub. He joined Woolwich Arsenal in 1894 as first team trainer.

In April 1897, Hollis was tempted away by newly formed Bristol City, where he became manager; he ended up spending three separate spells with the Robins. His first ended in March 1899 when he left to become secretary-manager of Bedminster. Bedminster merged with Bristol City in 1900 and Hollis lost his job. However, in 1901, he returned to manage Bristol City. During this second and most successive spell, City finished as Southern League runners-up and were promoted to the Football League.

He left in March 1905, and managed a hotel between 1905 and 1911, having previously run a pub between 1899 and 1909. He took over as Bristol City manager for the third time in January 1911, and oversaw the club's relegation from the First Division back to the Second. He left Ashton Gate in April 1913, and in July that year took over as manager of Southern League Newport County where he remained until 1917. After that, he left football management altogether, though he spent a number of years as chairman of Bristol City's shareholders. He died in Bristol in April 1942.
