= Peacock (surname) =

Peacock is an English surname. Notable people with the surname include:

== Musicians ==
- Annette Peacock (born 1941), American musician
- Charlie Peacock (born 1956), American musician
- Dave Peacock (musician) (born 1945), English musician, one half of the duo Chas & Dave
- Francis Peacock (1723–1807), Scottish writer, dancer and musician
- Gary Peacock (1935–2020), American jazz double-bassist
- Sarah Peacock (musician), English musician

== Politicians and judges ==
- Alexander Peacock (1861–1933), Australian politician
- Andrew Peacock (1939–2021), Australian politician
- Barnes Peacock (1810–1890), English judge
- Barrow Peacock (born 1970), Louisiana politician
- Caleb Peacock South Australian businessman and politician
- Elizabeth Peacock (born 1937), British Conservative politician
- Hugh Peacock, Canadian politician
- John Michael Peacock, frontier leader and politician of the Cape Colony
- John Thomas Peacock (1827–1905), New Zealand politician
- Joseph Peacock (businessman), South Australian businessman and politician
- Millie Peacock (1870–1948), Australian politician, first woman elected to the Parliament of Victoria
- Peter Peacock (born 1952), Scottish politician
- Stephanie Peacock (born 1986), British politician
- Thomas Peacock (politician) (1837–1922), New Zealand politician

== Sportspeople ==
=== American football (gridiron) ===
- David Peacock (American football) (1890–1944), American college football player, coach and politician
- Johnny Peacock (American football) (born 1947), American football player

=== Baseball ===
- Brad Peacock (born 1988), American baseball pitcher
- Johnny Peacock (1910–1981), American baseball catcher
- Matt Peacock (baseball) (born 1994), American baseball pitcher

=== Football (soccer) ===
- Alan Peacock (1937–2025), English footballer
- Darren Peacock (born 1968), English footballer
- Dylan Peacock (born 2001), Gibraltarian footballer
- Ernie Peacock (1924–1973), English footballer
- Gavin Peacock (born 1967), English footballer
- Joe Peacock (1897–1979), England footballer
- John Peacock (footballer) (born 1956), manager of the England national under-17 football team
- Keith Peacock (born 1945), English footballer
- Lee Peacock (born 1976), Scottish footballer
- Niamh Peacock (born 2008), English footballer
- Richard Peacock (footballer) (born 1972), English footballer
- Tom Peacock (1912–?), English educator and footballer

=== Rugby ===
- Alfred Peacock, English rugby player
- Danny Peacock (1968–2025), Australian rugby player
- Harry Peacock (rugby union) (1909–1996), Wales rugby player
- Jamie Peacock (born 1977), English rugby player

=== Other ===
- Daniel Peacock (cricketer) (born 1975), English cricketer
- David Peacock (bowls) (born 1970), British lawn bowler
- Eulace Peacock (1914–1996), American athlete
- Hamish Peacock (born 1990), Australian javelin thrower
- Howell Peacock (1889–1962), American college basketball coach
- Jonnie Peacock (born 1993), English paralympic sprinter
- Shane Peacock (ice hockey) (born 1973), Canadian ice hockey player
- Stephanie Peacock (swimmer) (born 1992), American swimmer
- Tyke Peacock (born 1961), American high jumper
- William Peacock (water polo) (1891–1948), British water polo player

== Other ==
- Alan T. Peacock (1922–2014), British economist
- Anna Peacock, New Zealand and British optical engineer
- Daniel Peacock (disambiguation), multiple people
- David Peacock (disambiguation), multiple people
- Dmitri Rudolf Peacock (1842–1892), British philologist and diplomat
- Doug Peacock (disambiguation), multiple people
- Edgar Peacock (1893–1955), decorated British Army officer
- Edward Peacock (disambiguation), multiple people
- George Peacock (disambiguation), multiple people
- Henry and Lena Peacock, namesakes of Peacock Apartments in Muncie, Indiana
- Ian Peacock, English broadcaster
- Jamie Peacock (disambiguation), multiple people
- John Peacock (disambiguation), multiple people
- Laurence Peacock (active 2010s), English playwright
- Mabel Peacock (1856–1920), English folklore collector
- Molly Peacock (born 1947), American poet
- Richard Peacock (disambiguation), multiple people
- Scott Peacock (born 1963), American chef
- Shane Peacock (disambiguation), multiple people
- Thomas Peacock (disambiguation), multiple people
- Trevor Peacock (1931–2021), English character actor
- William Peacock (disambiguation), multiple people

== Fictional characters ==
- Ashley Peacock, character in the British soap opera Coronation Street
- Belinda Peacock, character in the British soap opera EastEnders
- Claire Peacock, character in Coronation Street
- Freddie Peacock, character in Coronation Street
- Joshua Peacock, character in Coronation Street
- Maxine Peacock, character in Coronation Street
- Mrs. Peacock, character in the game Clue
- Captain Stephen Peacock, character in the British sitcoms Are You Being Served? and Grace & Favour
- Peacock, character in the video-game Skullgirls

== See also ==
- Peacock (disambiguation)
- Peacocke (disambiguation), variant
- Pocock
