= John Peacock =

John Peacock may refer to:

- Joe Peacock (John Peacock, 1897–1979), England international footballer
- John Peacock (piper) (c. 1756–1817), player of the Northumbrian smallpipes
- John Peacock (songwriter) (died 1867), English poet and songwriter
- John Peacock (footballer) (born 1956), manager of the England national under-17 football team
- John A. Peacock (born 1956), Professor of Cosmology at the University of Edinburgh
- John Michael Peacock, England-born frontier leader and politician of the Cape Colony
- John Thomas Peacock (1827–1905), New Zealand politician
- Johnny Peacock (1910–1981), American baseball catcher
- Johnny Peacock (American football) (born 1947), American football player
- Jonnie Peacock (born 1993), English paralympic sprint runner

== See also ==
- Peacock (surname)
