= George Peacock (disambiguation) =

George Peacock (1791–1858) was an English mathematician and Anglican cleric.

George Peacock may also refer to:

- George Peacock (captain) (1805–1883), English sea captain and shipowner
- George Peacock (manufacturer) (1824–1900), Australian businessman
- George Peacock (footballer) (1881–1943), Australian rules footballer
- George Peacock (luthier) (1942–2011), American luthier
- George Edwards Peacock, Australian colonial artist

== See also ==
- Peacock (disambiguation)
- George Peacocke (1821–1879), British politician
