= Peacocke =

Peacocke is a surname, and may refer to:

- Anthony Peacocke, British police officer
- Arthur Peacocke (1924–2006), English Anglican theologian and biochemist
- Christopher Peacocke (born 1950), British philosopher
- Cuthbert Peacocke (1903–1994), Church of Ireland cleric
- Gemma Peacocke, composer from New Zealand
- Gerry Peacocke (1931–2013), Australian politician
- Isabel Peacocke (1881–1973), New Zealand teacher, novelist and broadcaster
- Joseph Peacocke (archbishop of Dublin) (1835–1916), Church of Ireland cleric
- Joseph Peacocke (bishop of Derry and Raphoe) (1866–1962), Church of Ireland cleric
- Joseph Peacocke (cricketer) (1904–1961), Irish first-class cricketer
- M. R. Peacocke (born 1930), English poet
- Ponsonby Peacocke (1813–1872), British officer of the Bombay Army and artist
- Pryce Peacocke, Anglican priest in Ireland
- Steve Peacocke (born 1981), Australian actor
- Thomas Peacocke, Canadian actor
- T. W. Peacocke (born 1960), Canadian television and film director

== See also ==
- Peacocke, New Zealand, a suburb of Hamilton
- Peacock (disambiguation)
