= Pavo =

Pavo may refer to:

- Pavo (bird), a genus of peafowl
- Pavo (constellation), in astronomy
- Pavo (given name), a masculine Croatian name
- Pavo, Georgia, United States

== See also ==
- Paavo, Finnish and Estonian given name
- Pavão (disambiguation) (Portuguese 'peacock')
- Peacock (disambiguation)
- Peafowl
