= A. Viola Neblett =

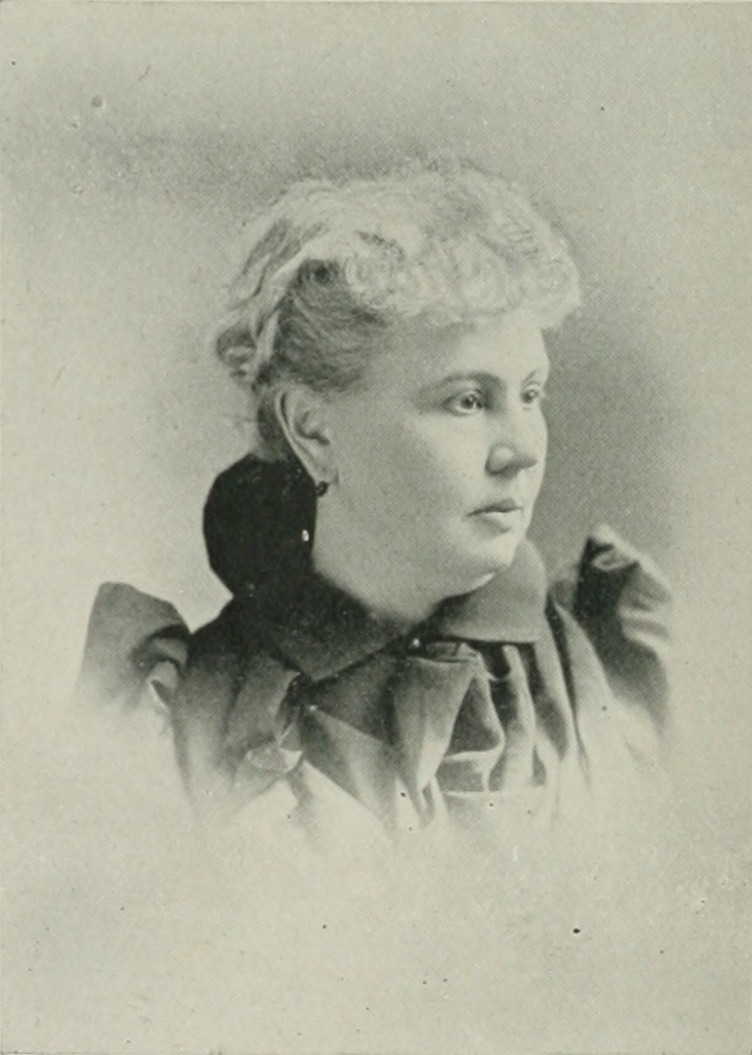
- A. Viola Neblett, "A Woman of the Century"
- Born: Viola Wright; March 5, 1842; Hamburg, South Carolina
- Died: April 30, 1897 (aged 55)
- Spouse: James M. Neblett (m. 1867; died in 1890)

A. Viola Neblett (March 5, 1842 – April 30, 1897) was an American temperance activist, suffragist, and women's rights pioneer. She was an indefatigable worker for temperance in Greenville, South Carolina, and was the first woman in her state to declare herself unreservedly for woman suffrage over her own signature in the public prints. She was a notable participant in the annual convention of this Association at Atlanta in 1895, and later spent months in Washington, D.C. in the endeavor to secure the enfranchisement of women under the new constitution of South Carolina. In her last days, she planned a bequest to the National American Woman Suffrage Association. In her own town, she founded and endowed the Neblett Free Library, her home becoming Greenville's first library.

== Early years ==
Viola Wright, whose first name was Ann or Adelaide, was born in Hamburg, Aiken County, South Carolina, March 5, 1842. Six months after her birth, her parents returned to their home in Augusta, Georgia. Her father, Adrian Wright, died before Viola turned eight. She is a descendant of two old Virginia families, the Ligons, of Amelia County, Virginia and the Christians, of the Virginia Peninsula, who were originally from the Isle of Wight. Her maternal great-grandfather was a captain in the Revolutionary War and served with distinction. Her grandmother was a Methodist preacher's wife, class-leader and Bible-reader.

Neblett's girlhood and early womanhood were passed in a quiet home in Augusta. The abolition of slavery and its enforcement at the close of the Civil War reduced her grandmother, her mother and herself to poverty, and, but for the help of a former slave, they would have suffered for food in 1865.

== Career ==
=== Temperance ===
In February 1867, she married James M. Neblett, of Virginia, a successful businessman. They made their name in Augusta till autumn 1879, after which time they removed to Greenville, South Carolina, with her mother and his aunt, Susan Turnispeed. Here, Neblett became friends with Mary Putnam Gridley, as well as George and Sarah Sirrine. Neblett was a charter member of Greenville's first women's organization, the Thursday Club. She wrote the club's bylaws and co-founded the club's first paper with Sarah Sirrine. Her focus on temperance occurred as it was "the only cause, aside from church work, that most men considered acceptable for women to champion". She became an indefatigable Woman's Christian Temperance Union (WCTU) worker, demonstrating executive ability and expending a great amount of her time. She forged an alliance with Virginia Durant Young at the WCTU convention in 1880.

=== Suffrage and women's rights ===
"Woman as an intelligent, responsible being should have a voice in law-making. Now she has indirect influence without responsibility, which is demoralizing." -A. Viola Neblett (1895)

In 1890, in Greenville, Neblett formed the South Carolina Equal Rights Association, alternating the presidency with Young. Neblett was the first woman in South Carolina to declare herself for woman suffrage, over her own signature, in the public prints, which was an act of heroism and might have meant social ostracism in the conservative South. In March 1895, she traveled in South Carolina making appointments for speakers who were to canvass the State in April or May in the interest of the woman's suffrage movement. In August, Neblett spent some days in Washington D.C., including visits with the editor of The Woman's Tribune. Neblett intended to camp with the South Carolina Constitutional Convention, which was to meet September 15, with the expectation that South Carolina would be the third to adopt woman's suffrage. Female suffragists, headed by Nesblett, arrived at the convention, but with small prospects of securing consideration. They made many friends among the delegates, supplied their desks with suffrage literature, and had hearings before two committees, before which they presented their arguments, and eventually had a public hearing before the whole convention in the state house. On September 17, Neblett, Young, and Laura Clay of Kentucky, addressed the convention on behalf of woman suffrage, but the newspapers reported that there was no likelihood of the Convention attendees acceding to their wishes. Although the woman's suffrage initiative was not passed, Neblett and Young were instrumental in having the age of consent raised from ten to fourteen, and for women gaining the right to be their children's legal guardians.

=== Religion ===
After years of study and mature thought on theological questions, she took broader and more liberal views concerning the Bible and its teachings, and was in accord with the advanced religious thought of her day. Having been reared amid slavery, seeing its downfall and observing the African American since 1865, she believed that the elevation of the African American must come through education.

=== Nesblett Free Library ===
James Neblett died in 1890 or December 28, 1891, after a long illness. He had sustained and encouraged her in her charitable work throughout their married life. In 1892, Nesblett and Turnispeed made oral agreements and wills leaving the property of each to the survivor. In 1896, Nesblett's religious and political beliefs caused estrangement between herself and Turnispeed, with whom she had lived for years, so in the same year, Nesblett created a new will in which nearly all her property was to be given to the Neblett library, which had already been established by her.

Neblett died April 30, 1897, and was buried at Magnolia Cemetery in Augusta. Nesblett left her property, valued at about US$20,000, and money, to a free library association, composed mostly of Unitarians. The name Unity library was then changed to Neblett library. Turnispeed brought suit to break the will, alleging a contract whereby Nesblett and Turnispeed made wills in 1892, leaving the property of each to the survivor. It was alleged that Nesblett destroyed this will and contract and made a will benefiting the library while under the influence of morphine, having acquired that habit by taking the drug during illness (cancer). In 1900, the South Carolina Supreme Court ruled in favor of Turnispeed such that the will was overturned and the library did not gain the US$20,000 left to it by Nesblett. As Nesblett had turned over her private residence to the library trustees in 1896, before creating her second will, the building was not involved in the supreme court's decision. The US$500 bequest to the National American Woman Suffrage Association was not over-turned by the supreme court decision.
