= Edward Peacock =

Edward Peacock may refer to:

- Edward Gryffydh Peacock (1826–1867), English rower and writer
- Edward Robert Peacock (1871–1962), Canadian merchant banker
- Edward Peacock (antiquary) (1831–1915), English antiquarian and novelist

== See also ==
- Edward Woodruffe-Peacock
