= English Martyrs School =

English Martyrs School may refer to:

- English Martyrs Catholic School, Leicester, UK
- English Martyrs RC Primary School, Trafford, UK
- English Martyrs School and Sixth Form College, Hartlepool, UK
