= Julie Etchingham =

English journalist (born 1969)

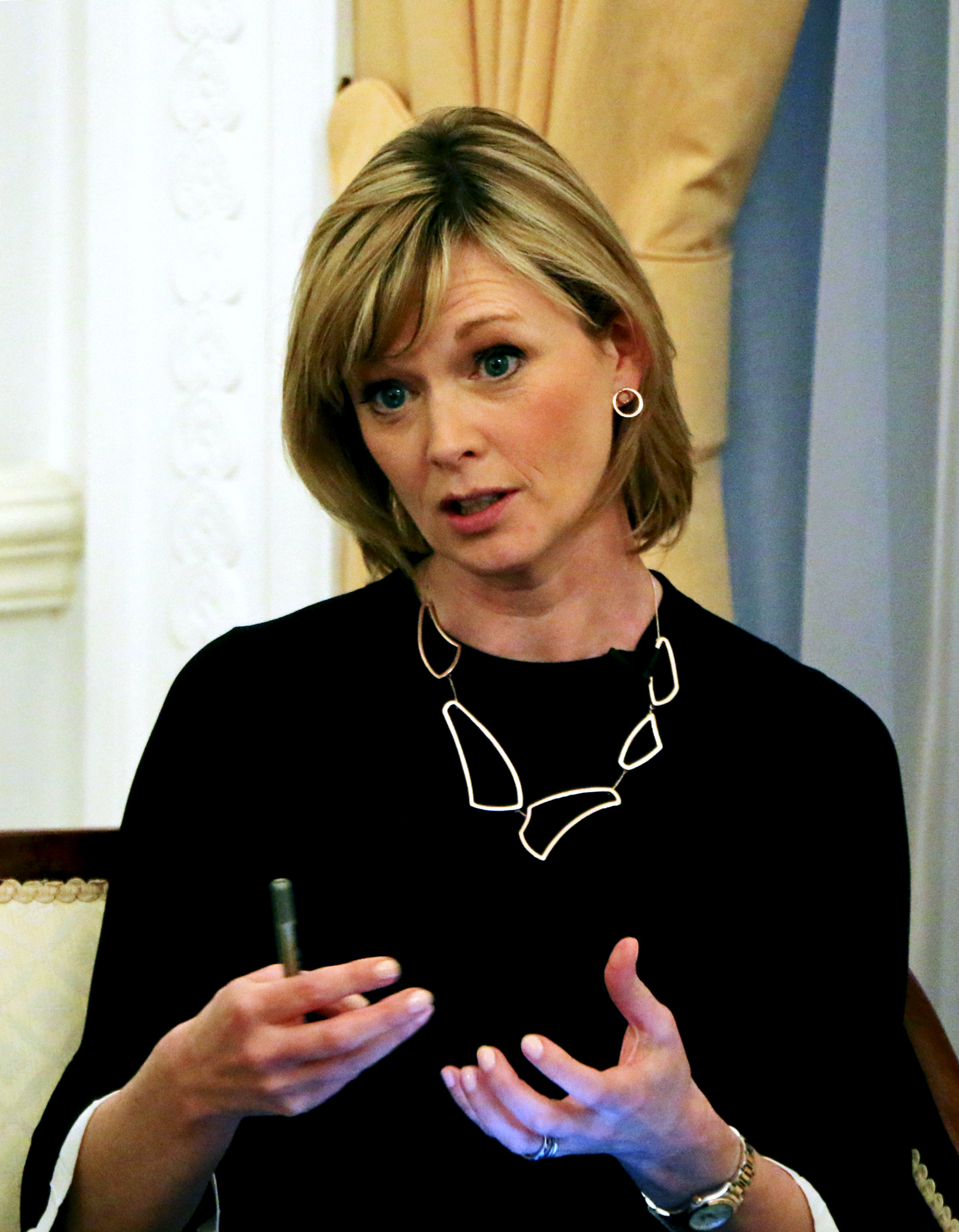
- Etchingham in 2017
- Born: Julie Anne Etchingham; 21 August 1969 (age 57); Leicester, Leicestershire, England
- Education: Newnham College, Cambridge (B.A.)
- Occupation: Newsreader
- Years active: 1990–present
- Notable credits: BBC (1994—2001); Sky News (2001—2007); ITV News (2008—); Tonight (2010—2022)
- Spouse: Nick Gardner (m. 1997)
- Children: 2
- Etchingham's voice recorded 2012, as part of an audio description of St Etheldreda's Church for VocalEyes

Julie Anne Etchingham (born 21 August 1969) is an English journalist who works as a television newsreader with ITV News. A graduate of Newnham College, Cambridge, Etchingham joined the BBC as a trainee after completing her studies, and went on to present the children's news programme Newsround in 1994. She joined Sky News in 2002, and also presented editions of Five News when Sky won the contract to produce news programming for Channel 5 in 2005.

Etchingham is currently a newscaster on ITV News at Ten and has been since 2008. She also presented the current affairs programme Tonight from 2010 until 2022 when she announced that she would still occasionally be reporting for the show. She was voted "Presenter of the Year" at the Royal Television Society journalism awards in 2010 and 2016.

== Life and career ==
Etchingham was born and raised in Leicester, Leicestershire, where both her parents were teachers. She was raised as a Roman Catholic, and educated at the city's English Martyrs Catholic School. After school she attended Newnham College, Cambridge, where she gained a BA (Honours) degree in English. She was the first girl from her school to attend Cambridge, and while reading English there was taught by Germaine Greer. She also co-presented BBC Radio Cambridgeshire's student programme On the Edge, produced by Ian Peacock. She got her first job in journalism with BBC Radio Leicester while still at school, and joined the BBC graduate programme from university.

Working at BBC Midlands, Etchingham became a presenter on Midlands Today, but soon moved on to present national programmes after moving to London. Her credits at the BBC include BBC's Breakfast News, Newsround (where she beat 1,000 other competitors to the job in 1994) and the corporation's long running Holiday programme. Etchingham joined Sky News in 2002, where she hosted a number of shows for the channel, including Sky News Today. She was also an occasional presenter on Five News after Sky took over as news provider for Channel Five in January 2005.

On 29 October 2007, during a speech by David Cameron, Etchingham's microphone was left open and an aside was accidentally broadcast during live coverage of the Conservative leader's address. Speaking on the issue of immigration, Cameron said: "Let me outline the action that a Conservative government would take. As we have seen, some of the increase in population size results from natural change – birth rates, death rates. Here our policy should be obvious ..." At this point, Etchingham was heard to say: "Extermination". Sky News said afterwards that her comment was "regrettable". Etchingham later described the incident as "not my finest hour. I apologised to Cameron personally". Cameron took the incident in good humour, recorded a parody of the incident for Etchingham's 40th birthday and had a toy Dalek delivered to her home.

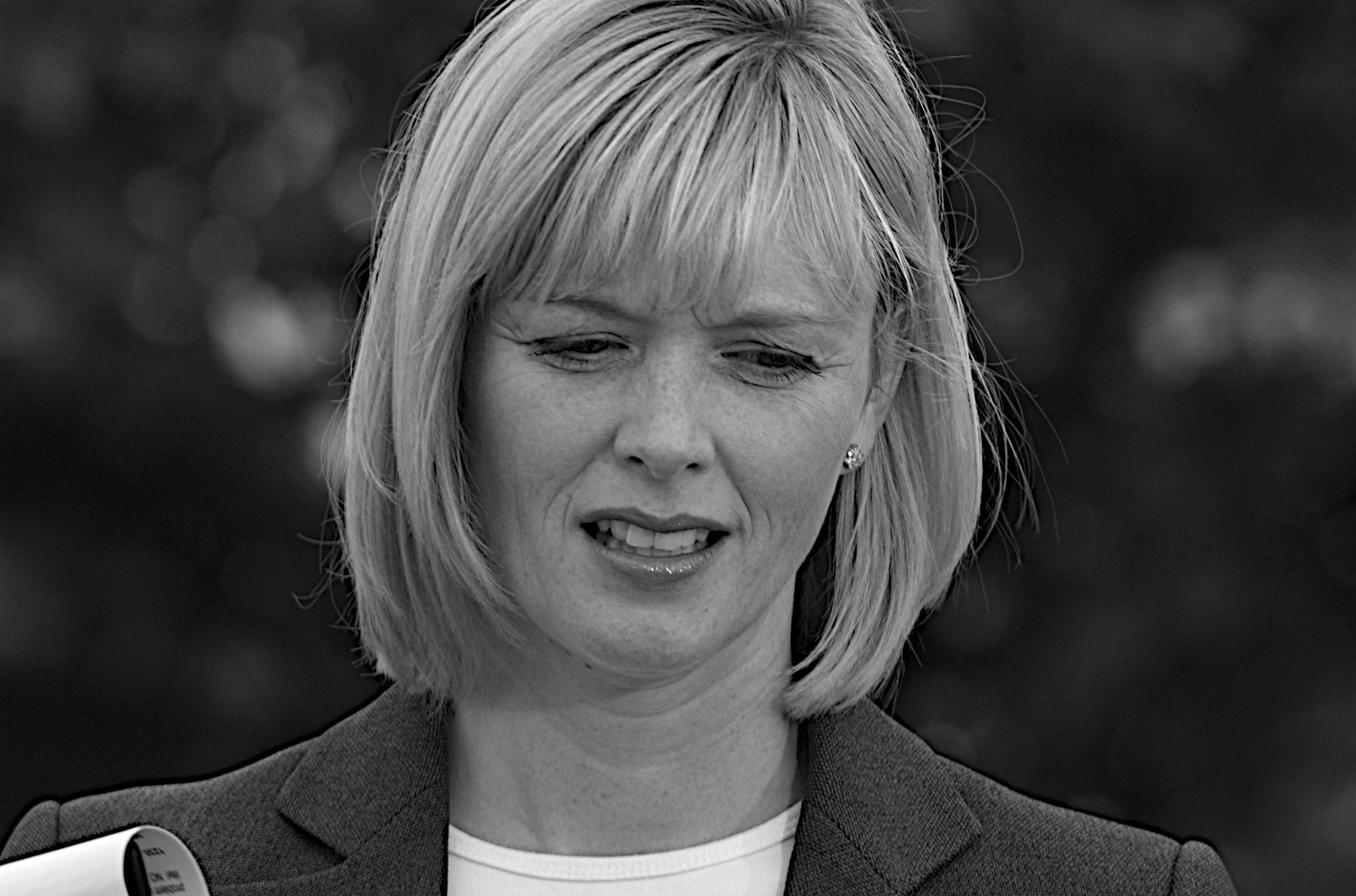
Etchingham in 2007

On 31 October 2007, ITV confirmed that in January 2008 Etchingham would move to present the relaunched News at Ten with Sir Trevor McDonald. The programme returned on 14 January. In June 2009, it was reported in the media that the President of Pakistan, Asif Ali Zardari, had stopped a plane from flying out of Pakistan after he heard Etchingham was running late after an interview between the two. In October 2009, it was announced that Etchingham would present a relaunched Tonight programme from early 2010 – with the show airing once a week on Thursday nights.

In April 2011, Etchingham and Phillip Schofield co-hosted ITV's coverage of the wedding of Prince William and Catherine Middleton. It was announced in April 2012 that she and Schofield would present the broadcaster's coverage of the Queen's Diamond Jubilee in June. In March 2013, she travelled to Rome to provide coverage of the election of Pope Francis for ITV News.

In March 2015, it was announced that Etchingham would chair a televised leaders debate for ITV ahead of the 2015 general election, the only leaders debate featuring Prime Minister David Cameron to be held that year. The programme was called The ITV Leaders' Debate. The debate took place on 2 April. Andrew Pettie of The Telegraph described Etchingham's presenting style as "composure itself", adding that it was "a bit robotic but this was no bad thing: it was refreshing to see a TV interviewer resolutely refusing to hog the limelight." She later co-presented the ITV coverage of the general election with Tom Bradby. In October 2015, News at Ten relaunched and returned to the single newscaster format, with former political editor Tom Bradby becoming the programme's new main presenter. Etchingham continues on the programme as Deputy Anchor, sharing the role with Rageh Omaar. Etchingham also files special reports for the programme.

In June 2016, she chaired Cameron and Farage Live: The EU Referendum and The ITV Referendum Debate for ITV News. In May 2017, Etchingham returned to chair The ITV Leaders' Debate ahead of the 2017 general election. On 5 June 2017, Etchingham conducted an interview with Prime Minister Theresa May, in which she talked about running through fields of wheat, which became a meme. On 3 July 2017, Etchingham presented a special edition of News at Ten celebrating 50 years of the programme. She interviewed Sir Trevor McDonald, a former presenter of the programme.

On 19 May 2018, Etchingham co-presented ITV's coverage of the wedding of Prince Harry and Meghan Markle with Phillip Schofield. On 9 July 2019, Etchingham presented Britain’s Next Prime Minister: The ITV Debate. The programme was broadcast live from Dock 10, MediaCityUK. On 17 April 2021, she co-presented ITV's coverage of the funeral of Prince Philip, Duke of Edinburgh with Tom Bradby.

In a ceremony on 30 October 2023, Etchingham was appointed as the new Pro-Chancellor for Birmingham Newman University. The Pro-Chancellor role is an advocate and ambassador of the University and represents the University in a ceremonial and representative capacity.

As of mid-2025, Etchingham very occasionally presents Sunday, BBC Radio 4's Sunday morning programme covering religion-related news and current affairs.

== Awards ==
Etchingham was voted "Presenter of the Year" at the Royal Television Society journalism awards in February 2010. She was the first woman to win the award. She won it again in February 2016. In April 2016, Etchingham was named "Broadcast Journalist of the Year" by the London Press Club.

== Personal life ==
In 1997, Etchingham married the television producer Nick Gardner. The couple have two sons and live in East Sheen. Her father is the cousin of Kathy Etchingham, an English writer and former partner of guitarist Jimi Hendrix.

=== Charity ===
Etchingham is vice president of the stillbirth charity Abigail's Footsteps. She is also a patron of the London homeless charity, Caritas Anchor House. Since 2018, Etchingham has also taken on the role of president at the Women of the Year Lunch and awards.

== Filmography ==
Year	Title	Role	Notes
1994–1997	Newsround	Presenter	
1999–2000	Breakfast News	Presenter	
2000–2001	BBC Breakfast	Presenter	
2002–2007	Sky News		
2008–2015	ITV Evening News	Relief Newscaster	
2008–	ITV News at Ten	Deputy Newscaster (2015–)	Main Newscaster (2008–2015)
2009–2015	ITV News weekend bulletins	Newscaster	
2010–2022	Tonight	Presenter	
2011	The Royal Wedding of Prince William & Kate Middleton	Alongside Phillip Schofield	One-off special
2012	The Queen's Diamond Jubilee	Alongside Phillip Schofield	One-off special
2015	The ITV Leaders' Debate	Presenter	Live Debate
2015	ITV's Election Night Live	Co-Presenter	Alongside Tom Bradby
2015	Exposure: Britain's Secret Slaves	Presenter	
2016	Cameron and Farage Live: The EU Referendum	Presenter	
2016	The ITV Referendum Debate	Presenter	Live Debate
2017	The ITV Leaders' Debate	Presenter	Live Debate
2017	On Assignment	Reporter	1 episode
2018	The Royal Wedding of Prince Harry & Megan Markle	Alongside Phillip Schofield	One-off special
2018—	Ask a Woman	Presenter	Online series
2019	Britain's Next Prime Minister: The ITV Debate	Presenter	Live debate between Boris Johnson and Jeremy Hunt for 2019 Conservative Party leadership election
2019	Johnson v Corbyn: The ITV Debate	Presenter	Live debate
2019	The ITV Leaders' Debate	Presenter	Live debate
2021	Prince Philip, Fondly Remembered	Co-Presenter	Alongside Phillip Schofield
2021	Prince Philip - A Royal Funeral	Co-Presenter	Alongside Tom Bradby
2022	The Queen’s Platinum Jubilee Celebration	Co-Presenter	Alongside Phillip Schofield
2022	Britain’s Next Prime Minister: The ITV Debate	Presenter	Live debate for July–September 2022 Conservative Party leadership election
2022	The Nations Proclaim the King	Presenter	Live event
2022	Queen Elizabeth II: The State Funeral	Co-Presenter	Alongside Tom Bradby
2023	King Charles III: The Coronation	Co-Presenter	Alongside Tom Bradby
2024	Sunak v Starmer: The ITV Debate	Presenter	Live debate
2024	The ITV Leaders' Debate	Presenter	Live debate
2024	Election 2024 Live: The Results	Presenter	Live event

== See also ==
- List of ITV journalists and newsreaders

Media offices
Preceded by Jon Snow	RTS: Television Journalism; Presenter of the Year; 2010	Succeeded by Jon Snow
Preceded by Mary Nightingale	Deputy Newscaster: ITV News at Ten; 2015 – present	Succeeded by Incumbent
Preceded by Trevor McDonald	Presenter: Tonight; 2010 – 2022	Succeeded by Paul Brand
Preceded by N/A	Female Newscaster: ITV News at Ten; 2008–2015	Succeeded by N/A
