= Dennis Roberts (footballer) =

English footballer (1918–2001)

Personal information
- Date of birth: 5 February 1918
- Place of birth: West Bretton, Yorkshire, England
- Date of death: 8 April 2001 (aged 83)
- Place of death: Huddersfield, Yorkshire, England
- Position: Centre half

Senior career*
Years	Team	Apps	(Gls)
1934–1935	Huddersfield Town	0	(0)
1935–1938	Notts County	0	(0)
1938–1954	Bristol City	306	(2)
- * Club domestic league appearances and goals

Dennis Roberts (5 February 1918 – 8 April 2001) was an English footballer who played as a centre half. He made over 300 Football League appearances throughout his career.

== Career ==
Dennis Roberts was born in West Bretton, Yorkshire. He played local schools football in Huddersfield, gaining representative honours, probably for Huddersfield Boys. He signed as an amateur for Huddersfield Town but never appeared in the first team. At the age of 17 years in August 1937 Roberts signed for Notts County where, although he never played a first team game, he received good advice and coaching from "Dixie" Dean & Hughie Gallacher who were both at the club at the time. Joe Riley recommended Roberts to Bristol City and Bob Hewison signed him in August 1938 on a free transfer.

Dennis Roberts made his debut at centre half at Clapton Orient in a 1–1 draw on 24 September 1938 following the retirement of Joe Pearce. Roberts spent his whole career at Bristol City playing in the Third Division South making 24 appearances in 1938–39 and 3 appearances in 1939–40 before the war. During the war he made a further 205 wartime appearances before emerging, after the war when League football recommenced, as the regular centre half and captain for several seasons. Roberts was ever present in 1946–47 with 42 appearances and played regularly in each of the next four seasons with 38 appearances, 41 appearances, 39 appearances and 41 appearances in season 1950–51 when Roberts captained the "Robins" to the 5th round of the FA Cup where they lost 0–2 at Birmingham City. Roberts was ever present again in 1951–52 and scored his first goal in a 1–1 draw with Plymouth Argyle on Boxing Day. Ernie Peacock who eventually succeeded Roberts at centre half started playing alongside Roberts at right half in February 1950. Bristol City had been languishing too long in the lower reaches of the Third Division South and when Roberts was seriously injured in 1952–53, manager Pat Beasley signed Jack White from Aldershot in October 1952 immediately appointing White as captain. Roberts made 17 appearances scoring 1 goal in 1952–53 playing centre half alongside wing halves Peacock and White again in early 1953–54 making his final 15 appearances as City rose to 7th in the table by November.

After retiring in May 1954 Dennis Roberts was landlord of the "Avon Packet" and then the "Ship Inn" near St Mary Redcliffe church in Bristol. Roberts later drove a fork lift truck at GKN Bedminster until his retirement from work in February 1983. He moved back to Clayton West, Yorkshire following the death of his wife, and died in Huddersfield.
