= Jack White (footballer, born 1924) =

English footballer

Personal information
- Full name: John White
- Date of birth: 17 March 1924
- Place of birth: Doncaster, England
- Date of death: July 2011 (aged 87)
- Place of death: Tunbridge Wells, England
- Position: Centre half

Youth career
- 194?–194?: Broadworth Main
- 194?–194?: Frickley Colliery

Senior career*
Years	Team	Apps	(Gls)
194?–1944	Sheffield F.C.		
1944–1952	Aldershot	209	(25)
1952–1958	Bristol City	216	(11)
1958–1961	Cambridge City		
1961–19??	Wellington Town		

Managerial career
- 1958–1961: Cambridge City player manager
- 1961–19??: Wellington Town manager
- * Club domestic league appearances and goals

John White (17 March 1924 – July 2011) was an English footballer who played as a centre half. He made over 420 Football League appearances in the years after the Second World War.

== Career ==
White, a former miner, played locally for Broadworth Main and Frickley Colliery in Yorkshire. He signed for Aldershot from Sheffield FC in July 1944. Pat Beasley signed White in October 1952 from Aldershot for £5,300 for Bristol City. Jack White immediately displaced Dennis Roberts both at the heart of the defence and as captain of the side. Jack White made his Bristol City debut at centre half in a 4–0 win v Gillingham on 11 October 1952. Bristol City briefly reached 2nd place during the 1952–53 season but finished in 5th position. White made 33 appearances scoring 4 goals in his first season with Bristol City. The following season 1953–54 Bristol City rose to 3rd place as Jack White initially played a mixture of centre half and left back when Dennis Roberts returned to the side. He spent the second half of that season at left half when Ernie Peacock and Terry Compton held the centre half position. White made 40 appearances scoring 3 goals including one goal in a 5–2 win at Aldershot. Jack White captained Bristol City to the Third Division South championship in 1954–55 when White was ever present making 46 appearances scoring 2 goals whilst playing in all three half back positions. In the Second Division in 1955–56 Jack White made 41 appearances scoring 1 goal missing only one match and playing mainly at right half alongside Peacock at centre half and Cyril Williams at left half. Jack White was the regular right half then centre half when Peacock was missing in 1956–57. White made 37 appearances scoring 1 goal with Bristol City a mid table Second Division side. In his final season with Bristol City Jack White made 20 appearances without scoring in 1957–58 under the new captain Tommy Burden. Jack White joined Cambridge City of the Southern League as player manager in April 1958. Cambridge City finished above Cambridge United in all three seasons playing in the South Eastern division in 1958–59, then finished 5th in the Premier Division in 1959–60 and 9th the following season. After three seasons White moved on to Wellington Town as manager. Wellington United were 13th in the Premier Division in 1961–62 and then as Wellington Town finished 6th in 1962–63.

After retiring from football Jack White became a service engineer in Tonbridge with a firm run by Bristol City chairman Harry Dolman. He later worked for Tonbridge Printers and returned to Doncaster in 1978 to work as a labourer at Thorpe Marsh Power Station. He retired in March 1989 and was living in Tonbridge in 1997.

Jack White's younger brother Len White (1930–1994) was also a professional footballer playing for Rotherham United, Newcastle United, Huddersfield Town and Stockport County. Len White made 245 appearances scoring 197 goals for Newcastle United. This the third highest career total of League goals for Newcastle United exceeded only by Jackie Milburn and Alan Shearer.

== Honours ==
with Bristol City

- Football League Third Division South winner: 1954–55
