= Grayingham =

Village and civil parish in the West Lindsey district of Lincolnshire, England

Coordinates: 53.454110°N 0.593890°W

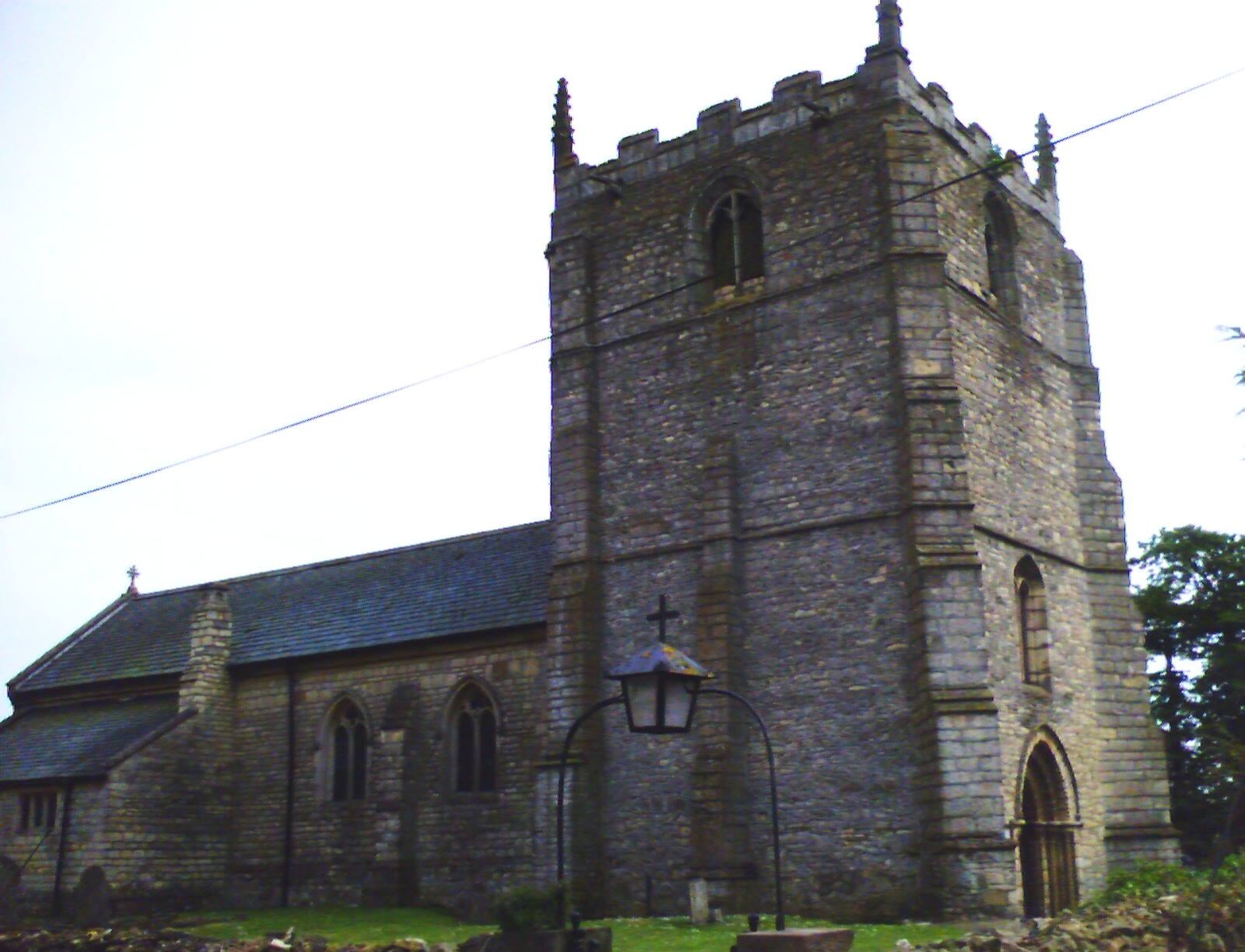
- Church of St Radegund, Grayingham

- Location within Lincolnshire
- Population: 123 (2011)
- OS grid reference: SK984961
  - London: 135 mi (217 km) S
- District: West Lindsey
- Shire county: Lincolnshire
- Region: East Midlands
- Country: England
- Sovereign state: United Kingdom
- Post town: GAINSBOROUGH
- Postcode district: DN21
- Police: Lincolnshire
- Fire: Lincolnshire
- Ambulance: East Midlands
- UK Parliament: Gainsborough

Grayingham is a village and civil parish in the West Lindsey district of Lincolnshire, England. The population of the civil parish at the 2011 census was 123. It is situated 1 mile (1.6 km) south from Kirton in Lindsey, 8 miles (13 km) north-east from Gainsborough and 8 miles south from Scunthorpe.

The name Grayingham derives from the Old English Gra(ga)+inga+ham for "homestead of the family of a man named Graeg". The name is listed in the 1086 Domesday Book as "Graingeham".

Grayingham Grade II* listed Anglican church is dedicated to Saint Radegund. Originating from the 13th and 14th century, it was rebuilt in 1773 or 1797, leaving the Early English tower and west doorway intact. A further restoration was carried out in 1870 by James Fowler. The 19th-century reredos is by A. B. Skipwith, and a copper-gilt relief of the Crucifixion is by Conrad Dressler.

An extension to the south of the church was completed in Spring 2025, the church now has the addition of a servery, Toilet and extra meeting space.

== Notable people ==
The English ecologist Adrian Woodruffe-Peacock was Rector of Grayingham towards the end of his life. He died in this post in 1922.

His sister, Mabel Peacock (1856–1920), English folklorist and writer is buried beside him in the churchyard.
