= Running through fields of wheat =

2017 quote by Theresa May

In an interview with Julie Etchingham on ITV's Tonight programme on 5 June 2017, Theresa May, then Prime Minister of the United Kingdom, said the naughtiest thing she had ever done was to "run through fields of wheat" as a child. The comment was the subject of much parody on the internet and became a meme.

== Background ==
May led a campaign during the run-up to the 2017 general election she had called less than two months earlier. In an ITV News interview, she gave an insight into what it was like growing up as the daughter of a vicar, admitting she was a "bookish" child, and saying: "I didn't have brothers and sisters who I was playing with and so obviously I had friends but sometimes had to just go out and do things on my own."

== Excerpt ==
What's the naughtiest thing you ever did?

— Julie Etchingham

Oh, goodness me. Well, I suppose... gosh. Do you know, I'm not quite sure. Nobody is ever perfectly behaved, are they? I mean, you know, I have to confess, when me and my friend, sort of, used to run through the fields of wheat, the farmers weren't too pleased about that.

— Theresa May

== Reaction ==
At a speech at Glastonbury Festival, Labour leader Jeremy Corbyn joked that running through fields of wheat was "terrible" behaviour.

Elle Hunt of The Guardian said "One has to imagine even the most bookish of children is capable of more noteworthy wrongdoings than causing fleeting irritation to local agriculturalists... But even if the transient displacement of grain was the pinnacle of May’s youthful misbehaviour, her response failed the test implied of the question."

Media Mole of the New Statesman argued that May had been much naughtier in her political career.

== Impact ==
The 'fields of wheat' comment was widely reported in the media and became a phrase closely associated with May.

Concerns began to grow that a large group of people could be inspired by May's comments to also run through fields, potentially damaging crops in the process. Close to 30,000 people signed up to an event scheduled to take place in Norfolk from 23 to 24 June, with a further 59,000 saying they were interested in attending. A spokesperson from the National Union of Farmers told The Telegraph: "We welcome members of the public to responsibly enjoy the countryside, but keep yourself and any dogs to the rights of way and follow the Countryside Code."

During the 2019 Conservative Party leadership election, frontrunner Boris Johnson appeared to mock May as he was pictured near his Oxfordshire home recreating May's "naughtiest" moment running through what the media reported as a field of wheat.

As May neared the end of her Prime Ministership, she said that "One of the silliest things I ever did was answering that question, but there we are."
