= James Peacock =

James, Jim, or Jimmy Peacock may refer to:

- James Peacock (naval officer) (died 1653), English naval officer
- James Peacock (architect) (1735/1738–1814), English architect and surveyor
- Jim Peacock (footballer) (1871–after 1896), English footballer
- James Peacock (anthropologist) (born 1937), American anthropologist
- Jim Peacock (1937–2025), Australian molecular biologist
- Jamie Peacock, English professional rugby league player
