= William Peacock =

William Peacock may refer to:

- William Peacock (businessman) (1790–1874), Australian businessman and politician
- William Peacock (water polo) (1891–1948), British water polo player
- William D. Peacock (1933–1998), Native Canadian newspaper publisher
- William Peacock (biologist) (known as Jim Peacock, born 1937), Australian scientist
- Billy Peacock, boxer, see United States national amateur boxing flyweight champions
