= Selina Catherine Stow =

British botanist

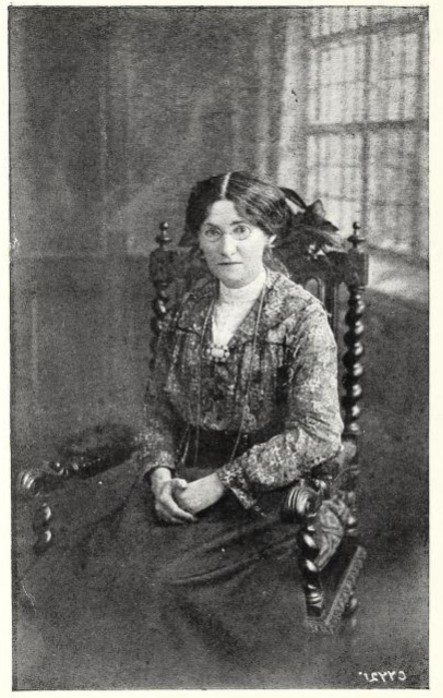
- Born: 1870; Much Wenlock, Shropshire, England
- Died: 18 August 1956
- Occupation: Botanist

Selina Catherine Stow (1870-18 August 1956) was a British botanist and the first female President of the Lincolnshire Naturalists' Union.

== Biography ==
Stow was born in Much Wenlock, Shropshire. Her father, T. Stow, was a naturalist. Her primary interest was in botany and she regularly undertook fieldwork recording plants. In 1903 she recorded the grass Vulpia unilateralis as new Britain. She worked with fellow botanists W.W. Mason, A. Bennet, J. Britten, W.H. Beeby, F.A. Lees, and Canon Fowler in contributing to the first Checklist of Lincolnshire Plants, published in 1909 by E. A. Woodruffe-Peacock.

In 1914 she was elected as the first female President of the Lincolnshire Naturalists' Union; The Rev. Adrian Woodruffe-Peacock, a fellow naturalist, wrote a biography of Catherine Stow's presidency in 1919 and noted that she was probably the first female President of any society of naturalists in Britain. Her Presidential address was on the subject of plant galls.

After the outbreak of the First World War, Stow served with the Voluntary Aid Detachment providing nursing care at Grantham.

== Publications ==
- Stow, C.S. 1913. "Lincolnshire Galled Plants", Transactions of the Lincolnshire Naturalist's Union for 1912-1915, 32–33.
- Stow, C.S. 1915. "Presidential Address to the Lincolnshire Naturalists' Union for 1914", Transactions of the Lincolnshire Naturalist's Union for 1912-1915, 153–164.
