= Peacock (disambiguation) =

Peacocks are adult male peafowl (large ground-nesting birds), known for their iridescent plumage.

Peacock or Peacocks may also refer to:

== Animals ==
=== Fish ===
- Aulonocara ("peacocks"), endemic to East Africa
- Peacock bass (Cichla), endemic to South America

=== Insects ===
- Peacock fly (Callopistromyia annulipes), native to North America

==== Nymphalid butterflies ====
- Anartia, a genus endemic to the Americas
- Aglais io, the European peacock
- Peacock pansy (Junonia almana), from South Asia

==== Swallowtail butterflies ====
- Papilio blumei, the green swallowtail
- Several other South Asian Papilio species

== Film, stage and television ==
- Peacock (2005 film) (Kong que), a Chinese film
- Peacock (2010 film), an American psychological thriller
- Peacock (2024 film), an Austrian-German comedy-drama film
- Peacock (TV series), a British comedy series, aired from 2022
- "Peacocks", an episode of the television series Teletubbies
- Peacock (streaming service), an American streaming service by NBCUniversal
- The logo of American television network NBC which is often called "The Peacock Network"
- Peacock Productions, the defunct long-form production unit of NBC News
- The Peacock, a small, experimental theatre within the Abbey Theatre, Dublin, Ireland

== Music ==
- Peacock Records, a record label (1949–1979)
- "Peacock" (song), 2010, by Katy Perry
- "Peacock", 2019 song by Jordan Sandhu
- "Peacock", 1986, by Splash (South African band)
- "Peacocks", by The Mountain Goats

== Naval vessels ==
- Peacock-class corvette, a Royal Navy ship class
- HMS Peacock, various Royal Navy ships
- USS Peacock, a number of U.S. Navy vessels

== Places ==
=== India ===
- Peacock Bay, Pune, Maharashtra
- Umananda Island, Guwahati, Assam (called Peacock Island by the British)

=== United States ===
- Peacock, Texas, an unincorporated community
- Peacock Township, Michigan
- Peacock Island (Connecticut)
- Peacock Mountains, Arizona
- Peacock Mountain, Washington
- Peacock Park, Miami, Florida, an urban park
- Peacock Peak, Arizona
- Peacock Spring I and Peacock Spring II, springs in Wes Skiles Peacock Springs State Park, Live Oak, Florida

=== Elsewhere ===
- Peacock Sound, Antarctica
- Peacock Island (disambiguation)

== Businesses ==
- Peacocks (clothing), a British value fashion chain
- The Peacocks (Woking), a shopping centre near London (now Victoria Place)
- Peacock (St. Paul's Churchyard), a Stuart-era London bookseller
- Peacock Inn, Chesterfield, Derbyshire, England, a former public house
- Peacock Inn, Islington, London, a former public house
- Daimaru Peacock (formerly Peacock Sangyo), a Japanese supermarket chain

== Science and technology ==
- Peacock (star), in the constellation Pavo
- Peacock ore or bornite, a mineral
- Peacock Palmtop PC, a 1990s mobile device

== Sport ==
- Saint Peter's Peacocks, athletic teams of Saint Peter's University
- "The Peacocks", a nickname for the English football club Leeds United

== People and fictional characters ==
- Peacock (surname), including fictional characters
- Olaf the Peacock (c. 938–1006), Icelandic merchant and chieftain

== Other uses ==
- Peacock (Fabergé egg), a 1908 Fabergé egg
- Peacock Lane, Portland, Oregon, a short street
- Peacock Mausoleum, Gorton, Manchester, England, a Victorian monument to Richard Peacock and his son Joseph

== See also ==
- R v Peacock, a law case
- The Flying Peacock, a professional wrestler from All-Star Wrestling
- Pavão (disambiguation) (Portuguese for 'peacock')
- Pavo (disambiguation) (Latin for 'peacock')
