= Daniel Peacock (disambiguation) =

Daniel or Danny Peacock may refer to:

- Daniel Peacock (born 1958), English actor
- Daniel Peacock (cricketer) (born 1975), English cricketer
- Danny Peacock (born 1968), Australian rugby footballer
