= Eliza Gutch =

English author

- Born: 15 July 1840; Little Gonerby-cum-Manthorpe, Lincolnshire, England
- Died: 17 March 1931 (aged 90); Holgate Lodge, York, England
- Occupations: Writer, folklorist
- Writing career
- Period: 19th century
- Genre: Folklore

Eliza Gutch (née Hutchinson; 1840–1931) was an English author, contributor to Notes and Queries, and founding member of the Folklore Society. She made immense contributions to the establishment of folklore and dialect studies.

== Personal life ==
Gutch was born on 15 July 1840, at Manthorpe Lodge in Little Gonerby-cum-Manthorpe, Lincolnshire, as Eliza Hutchinson. Her father, Simon Hutchinson, was a land agent in Little Gonerby.

On 22 January 1868, she married York solicitor John James Gutch. They had four children: Bertha (b. 1869), John (b. 1870), Wilfrid (b. 1871), and Clement (1875-1908). She was widowed in 1881.

== Career ==
Gutch had an abiding interest in the history and folklore of the region of England in which she lived. She was a founder member of the English Dialect Society in 1873, and a prolific contributor to the journal Notes and Queries under the pseudonym "St Swithin", a reference to her date of birth. It was from her suggestion in a February 1876 issue of Notes and Queries that the Folklore Society was formed in 1878, with Gutch as a founder member.

Her knowledge of folklore was utilised by Joseph Wright in his English Dialect Dictionary, to which she contributed her findings on the folklore of both Lincolnshire and Yorkshire. Gutch herself collected the materials for, and edited three volumes of, the County Folklore series, and wrote a number of shorter articles on folklore.

Eliza Gutch was the last private owner of Holgate Windmill, and her children sold the Mill on her death to the City of York Council for preservation as a historic site. She died at Holgate Lodge on 17 March 1931.

== Works ==
- Gutch, E; Folklore Society (1901). County folk-lore, vol. 2. Printed extracts, no. 4: examples of printed folk-lore concerning the North Riding of Yorkshire, York and the Ainsty. London. OCLC 1128324081.
- Gutch, E; Peacock, M. G. W; Folklore Society (1908) County folk-lore. v.5 Examples of printed folk-lore concerning Lincolnshire. London: Nutt. OCLC 1110253433.
- Gutch, E; Folklore Society (1912). County folk-lore, vol. 6. Printed extracts no. 8: examples of printed folk-lore concerning the East Riding of Yorkshire. London: David Nutt. OCLC 931356221.
