= Peacock Island =

Peacock Island can refer to:

- Peacock Island (Connecticut) in Stratford, Connecticut, United States
- Umananda Island in Guwahati, Assam, India, called Peacock Island by the British

== See also ==
- Peacock (disambiguation)
- Pfaueninsel in Berlin, Germany
