= Meanderings of Memory =

Rare English book

- Author: Nightlark
- Language: English
- Publication date: 1852
- Publication place: United Kingdom

Meanderings of Memory is a lost book published in London in 1852 and attributed to Nightlark (probably a pseudonym). Although it is cited as a first or early source for over 50 entries in the Oxford English Dictionary (OED), the current OED editors have been unable to locate a surviving copy. OED editors made their search for the elusive source public in May 2013.

== OED citations ==
The OED is a comprehensive multi-volume historical dictionary, whose first edition was published in installments called fascicles between 1884 and 1928. The definition of every sense of every headword entry is accompanied by quotations, listed chronologically, from cited sources, to illustrate when and how the word was used. These citations were mostly submitted to the editors by volunteer readers in what current OED editors describe as an early instance of what is now called crowdsourcing. The editors selected a subset of quotations, including the earliest one for a given sense, for inclusion. They typically verified the citations given, though some might be taken on trust based on the submitter's reputation or previous reliability.

The first edition of the OED included citations from Meanderings of Memory for senses of 50 entries: chapelled, cock-a-bondy, couchward, day, dike/dyke, droop, dump, epistle, extemporize, fancy, flambeau, flesh, foodless, fringy, full, gigantomachy, goal, goalward, hearthward, idol, inscriptionless, lump, peaceless, rape, re- (prefix), reliefless, rheumatize, sanctuaried, sap, sarcophage, scarf, scavage, shoe, slippery, sun, templed, transplanter, tribe, tribunal, trouse, trunked, un- (prefix), unbusy, unstuff, vermined, vulgar, warmthless, wen, whinge, and width. In 2010, the third edition of the OED added the word revirginize, whose earliest citation is the 51st from Meanderings of Memory. Inspection of the original submission slips in the OED archive in 2013 revealed that they came from Edward Peacock (1831–1915), an antiquary, writer, and regular OED volunteer reader living near Brigg in Lincolnshire.

Citations of Meanderings of Memory in the Oxford English Dictionary
| Headword (class) | Meanderings ref | Quotation (Note: An *asterisk before the word indicates the quotation was the earliest recorded use of the relevant form and sense) | Form and/or sense | Ref (Note: To NED (OED 1st edition) unless stated) |
|---|---|---|---|---|
| chapelled (ppl adjective) | I. 182 | The Chapelled templer | chapelled | (Note: Vol.II p.276 c.2) |
| cock-a-bondy | I. 65 | Who can trim a cock~abundy, turn a rod with him? | cock-a-bondy | (Note: Vol.II p.568 c.1) |
| couchward | I. 182 | Care for your couchward path. | couchward | (Note: Vol.II p.1049 c.2) |
| day | I. 149 | Day-drowsiness and night's arousing power. | "23. General combinations; c. With agent-nouns and words expressing action, '(that acts or is done) by day, during the day, as distinguished from night'" day-drowsiness | (Note: Vol.III D p.51 c.1) |
| dike/dyke (noun) | I. 15 | Dyke-cloistered Taddington, (Note: There are villages named Taddington in Derbyshire and in Gloucestershire) of cold intense. | "10. attrib. and Comb." dike-cloistered | (Note: Vol.III D p.359 c.1) |
| dike/dyke (noun) | I. 53 | The dikeside watch when Midnight-feeders stray. | "10. attrib. and Comb." dikeside | |
| droop (adjective) | I. 87 | In the droop ash shade. | droop | (Note: Vol.III D p.678 c.2) |
| dump (adjective) | (Note: Not specified in OED (1st ed.)) | An heiress doughy-like and dump. | "2. Of the consistence of dough or dumpling; without elasticity or spring" | (Note: Vol.III D p.714 c.1) |
| epistle (verb) | I. 35 | Tis noted down—Epistled to the Duke | "2. b. To write (something) in a letter." | (Note: Vol.III E p.246 c.2) |
| extemporize | I. 47 | Matter to sustain The staggering extemporizer's pain | extemporized | (Note: Vol.III E p.455 c.3) |
| fancy | I. 79 | The *fancy-grazing herds of freedom's pen. | "B. attrib and Comb; 1. General relations; (c) Instrumental, originative and adverbial" fancy-grazing | (Note: Vol.IV F p.61 c.2) |
| flambeau | I. 166 | Flambeaued folly of the long procession. | flambeaued | (Note: Vol.IV F p.280 c.2) |
| flesh (noun) | I. 157 | Air coloured, scarcely carnate, or a flesh. | "5.b. ellipt. for flesh-colour" | (Note: Vol.IV F p.315 c.1) |
| foodless | I. 10 | Galls them no more their foodlessness or fag. | foodlessness | (Note: Vol.IV F p.397 c.3) |
| fringy | I. 206 | Fluttering as the mantle's fringy rim. | "2. furnished or adorned with a fringe or fringes; covered with fringes." | (Note: Vol.IV F p.552 c.2) |
| full (adjective) | I. 79 | Where *full-dug foragers at evening meet In Cow-bell concert. | "12. Comb. a. with nouns forming combinations used attrib." full-dug | (Note: Vol.IV F p.590 c.2) |
| gigantomachy | I. 128 | One is the sculptor, of the statue nice, Or Gigantomachies of rock and ice. | "2. A representation of [ the war of the giants against the gods]" | (Note: Vol.IV G p.159 c.2) |
| goal (noun) | I. 131 | With a giddy foot and *goal-ward rush. | "6. attrib. and Comb." goalward | (Note: Vol.IV G p.262 c.3) |
| hearthward | I. 206 | Hag of the hearthward cringe and tripod stool. | hearthward | (Note: Vol.V Pt.1 p.165 c.2) |
| idol | I. 211 | A heathen lamp supplies With meagre beam his *Idol-anchored eyes. | "10. Comb.; e. instrumental and locative" idol-anchored | (Note: Vol.V Pt.2 p.25 c.3 |) |
| inscriptionless | I. 71 | A margin stone I crave Inscriptionless, or chiselled by the wave. | inscriptionless | (Note: Vol.V Pt.2 p.329 c.1 |) |
| lump (verb^{3}) | I. 12 | I the mattress spread, And equal lay whatever lumps the bed. | "1. b. To form or raise into lumps." | (Note: Vol.VI Pt.1 p.499 c.3) |
| peaceless | I. 20 | Coins that were tinkled, ever shook In pouch of peacelessness. | peacelessness | (Note: Vol.VII p.584 c.1) |
| rape (verb^{2}) | I. 87 | With art's refinement he would ... rape the soul. | "4. To transport, ravish, delight" | (Note: Vol.VIII Pt.1 p.150 c.1) |
| re- (prefix) | I. 21 | O too *re-brutalized! O too bereaved! | "5. b. prefixed to verbs and sbs. which denote 'making (of a certain kind or quality)', 'turning or converting into —', esp. those formed on adjs. by means of the suffix -ize" re-brutalize | (Note: Vol.VIII Pt.1 p.188 c.1) |
| revirginize | | Where that cosmetic .. Shall e'er revirginize that brow's abuse | revirginize | (Note: Not in OED (1st ed.) under "revirginize" (Note: Vol.VIII Pt.1 p.610 cc.2–3 (Revirescent–Revis)) or "re- (prefix) 5. b." The word was added to the 3rd edition in 2010.) |
| reliefless | I. 23 | Alone reliefless in thy cold distress | reliefless | (Note: Vol.VIII Pt.1 p.408 c.1) |
| rheumatize | I. 57 | Raw November's rheumatizing grass. | "2. To make rheumatic, affect with rheumatism." | (Note: Vol.VIII Pt.1 p.628 c.3) |
| sanctuaried | I. 175 | If a thought Should cream the blood in sanctuaried court. | sanctuaried | (Note: Vol.VIII Pt.2 p.83 c.3) |
| sap (noun^{5}) | I. 164 | He crowned his head but with another cap Than Cardinal's—for that he wants no Sap. | "A simpleton, a fool." | (Note: Vol.VIII Pt.2 p.100 c.3) |
| sarcophage | I. 210 | Yon vermined Sarcophage. | "2. A flesh-eater" | (Note: Vol.VIII Pt.2 p.109 c.2) |
| scarf (noun^{1}) | I. 109 | Scarf-like and ethereally slight. | "7. attrib. and Comb." scarf-like | (Note: Vol.VIII Pt.2 p.187 c.3) |
| scavage (verb) | I. 56 | The brain will scavage and the breast unstuff. | scavage | (Note: Vol.VIII Pt.2 p.196 c.1) |
| shoe | I. 163 | He looked submission with a shoeward eye. | "6. attrib. and Comb.; c. Special comb." shoeward | (Note: Vol.VIII Pt.2 p.724 c.3) |
| slippery | I. 64 | Thou silvery-backed, and slippery-bellied Eel. | "9. Comb." slippery-bellied | (Note: Vol.IX Pt.1 p.223 c.3) |
| sun | I. 196 | Sunfaced choristers. | "12. Comb.; c. Similative and parasynthetic" sunfaced | (Note: Vol.IX Pt.2 Su–Sz p.153 c.2 |) |
| sun | I. 128 | And Sun-side Alps all tortuously slip. | "13. Special Combs.: sun-side (now rare) the side facing the sun, the sunny side (also attrib.)" | (Note: Vol.IX Pt.2 Su–Sz p.153 c.2 |) |
| templed (ppl adjective) | I. 114 | We .. Rambled such river sides and templed lands. | "3. Furnished or adorned with a temple or temples." | (Note: Vol.IX Pt.2 T–Th p.167 c.2) |
| transplanter | I. 21 | So thence uprooted with transplanter care, In other soil it scents another air. | transplanter | (Note: Vol.X Pt.1 Ti-Tz p.275 c.3) |
| tribe (verb) | I. 104 | Her nature may with thine be tribed. | tribe | (Note: Vol.X Pt.1 Ti-Tz p.339 c.3) |
| tribunal | I. 32 | Tribunalled judge, he weds the weaker cause, Holds sternly up as he lays down the laws. | tribunalled (adjective) | (Note: Vol.X Pt.1 Ti-Tz p.341 c.1) |
| trouse | I. 86 | The belted blouse Of velvet black, and closely-fitting trouse. | trouse | (Note: Vol.X Pt.1 Ti-Tz p.408 c.2) |
| trunked (adjective) | I. 132 | The trunked forest's deep Where graces dance. | trunked "I 1. Having a trunk, as a tree" | (Note: Vol.X Pt.1 Ti-Tz p.428 c.3) |
| un- (prefix) | I. 15 | A thing *unmental, mannerless and crude. | un- "7. freely prefixed to adjectives of all kinds" unmental | (Note: Vol.X Pt.1 U p.31 c.1) |
| un- (prefix) | I. 76 | Hope, *uncelestialized by heathen hand. | un- "8. prefixing to past participles; a. Simple past pples. in -ed; (c) forms in -ized" uncelestialized | (Note: Vol.X Pt.1 U p.32 c.2) |
| un- (prefix) | I. 5 | Worn As weary nakedness, *unshooned, unshorn. | un- "9. Adjectival forms in -ed, from substantives" unshooned | (Note: Vol.X Pt.1 U p.32 c.3) |
| unbusy (adjective) | I. 196 | If bigotted, or most unbusy herd, O'er stocked with time and talent, were preferred. | unbusy | (Note: Vol.X Pt.1 U p.73 c.2) |
| unstuff | I. 56 | The brain [it] will scavage and the breast unstuff. | unstuff | (Note: Vol.X Pt.1 U p.357 c.2) |
| vermined (adjective) | I. 210 | Yon vermined Sarcophage. | vermined | (Note: Vol.X Pt.2 V p.136 c.2) |
| vulgar (adjective) | I. 149 | She was not *vulgar-viewed, her thinkings took The self-same tenor. | "14. Comb." vulgar-viewed | (Note: Vol.X Pt.2 V p.327 c.3) |
| warmthless | I. 100 | Vain and virtueless and warmthless grown. | warmthless | (Note: Vol.X Pt.2 W–Wezzon p.105 c.3) |
| wen (noun^{1}) | I. 111 | The wen-necked women. | "1. c. Applied to the swelling on the throat characteristic of goitre. Also Comb." wen-necked | (Note: Vol.X Pt.2 W–Wezzon p.314 c.1) |
| whinge (noun) | I. 170 | With cur-like whinge to such soft cutting whip. | whinge | (Note: Vol.X Pt.2 Wh–Wyzen p.51 c.3) |
| width | I. 98 | The *widthless road. | widthless | (Note: Vol.X Pt.2 Wh–Wyzen p.114 c.3) |

== OED revision ==
The second (1989) edition of the OED retained almost all the information of the first edition essentially unrevised. The third edition (publication ongoing since 2000) is fully revisiting all entries. A staff member revising the entry for revirginize in 2013 sought to verify the word's earliest citation, from Meanderings of Memory: "Where that cosmetic ... Shall e'er revirginize that brow's abuse". When the staffer failed to locate the work, OED chief bibliographer Veronica Hurst launched a deeper search. No copy could be located; Hurst found no mention in Google Books, the Oxford Dictionary of National Biography or other works consulted; and confirmation of the book's existence initially rested entirely upon a short listing in an 1854 catalogue of G. Gancia, a bookseller in Brighton:

MEANDERINGS of Memory, by Nightlark, 8vo, boards London, 1852 6s Written and published by a well-known connoisseur with the epigraph "Cur potius lacrimæ tibi mi Philomela placebant?"

Investigating the Latin epigraph was another dead end. It translates to "why did my tears please you more, my Philomel?" and does not appear to be a quotation from another work.

== Public appeal ==
On 3 May 2013, OED editors posted about the book on the "OED Appeals" section of the website, which continues the volunteer-reader tradition by asking the public for help with the history of particular words or other lexicographic issues. The original post was:

A number of quotations in the OED derive from a book with the title Meanderings of Memory. However, we have been unable to trace this title in library catalogues or text databases. All these quotations have a date of 1852, and some cite the author as 'Nightlark'.

The only evidence for this book's existence that we have yet been able to find is a single entry in a bookseller's catalogue:

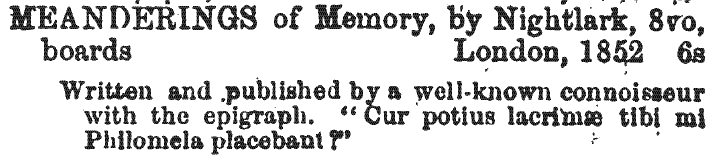

Have you ever seen a copy of this book? Can you identify the 'well-known connoisseur' mentioned by the bookseller?

The appeal was reported in the general media.

== Ongoing search ==
Seven Gancia catalogues are bound in a volume once owned by an A. F. Rodger, now in the Oxford University library and on Google Books. Three of these list Meanderings of Memory, with variations in detail and price: the Third Catalogue for 1852 on page 20; the First Catalogue for 1854 on page 10; and the Second Catalogue for 1854 (referred to by the OED) on page 27. The John Rylands Library, which contains many of Edward Peacock's private papers, found no copy of Meanderings of Memory. In 1893, a reader (Note: The reader, "Gandy", also asked values for other books: The Substance of Some Letters Written from Paris During the Last Reign of the Emperor Napoleon (1816 edition, by John Hobhouse, 1st Baron Broughton); A Circumstantial Narrative of the Campaign in Russia (1829, by Eugène Labaume); and The Commercial Room (1847, by Edward Gandy).) asked The Bazaar, Exchange and Mart to value the book; it replied, "We know nothing about this book, never having seen it before. The probability is that it is of little value."

Hurst suggested the book might contain content considered pornographic by Victorians, potentially resulting in nonstandard cataloguing. It might have been self- or privately published with a very small print run. Following the appeal to the public, another reference to Meanderings of Memory was found in an 1854 Sotheby's catalogue, which rendered less likely the notion that the work might be a hoax by a nineteenth-century miscreant. Identification of Peacock as the reader corroborated this. Given the "flowery" character of the work's quotations appearing in the OED, and in light of the Sotheby's auction record, Hurst postulates that Meanderings of Memory may turn out to be a short book of poetry.

In Christopher Linforth's 2014 short story "Here is the Light", among the miscellanea collected by protagonist Pym Dark are "flowery poetry chapbooks (including the sordid volume, the Meanderings of Memory)".
