= Mary Putnam Gridley =

Mary Putnam Gridley (September 7, 1850 - December 19, 1939) was the first female president of a cotton mill in South Carolina. She was also one of the charter members of the South Carolina Federation of Women's Clubs.

Born on September 7, 1850, she devoted her life too trying to build the reputation of women in business. She graduated from Boston Highschool then went on to Boston Normal School graduating in 1871. She taught for three years but decided to move to Greenville, South Carolina to help her father with his cotton mill. After her father's death, she became the president of the Mill. She excelled in management and administration here. This led her to getting the skills to become leader of the Greenville Equal Suffrage Club, charter member of the (SCFWC), and organizer of the Hopewell Tuberculosis Association. She died in Greenville on December 19, 1939.

== Biography ==
Mary Putnam Gridley was born on September 7 1850, in Hillston, Massachusetts to George Putnam and Mary Jane Shearson. Gridley graduated Boston High and Boston Normal School in 1871. After her college, she taught for three years in Peabody, Massachusetts before the family moved to Greenville, South Carolina. Her father then became prominent in the developing of cotton mills.

Gridley met her husband, Issac A. Gridley, in Greenville. He died two years after they got married and the couple did not have any children. Gridley worked throughout her life, advocating for businesswoman, as well as women's right to vote. She died on December 19, 1939 and was buried in the Christ Church Cemetery in Greenville, South Carolina.

== Career ==
Gridley worked for her father, owner of Batesville Mill; she was a bookkeeper and as her father's assistant. Her father's death led her to becoming Batesville Mill's president, becoming the first woman to be president of a cotton factory in South Carolina. She was president of the mill for twenty years until it was sold in 1912.

While she was president of the Mill, she also was an advocate of the Women's Suffrage Movement beginning in 1890. She was the treasurer of the South Carolina Equal Rights Association. Despite the group's efforts, the right to vote for woman was not added in the updated 1895 constitution. Following the selling of the Batesville Mill in 1912, she began too focus the rest of her life on woman advocacy and their right to vote. In January 1919, Gridley strongly encouraged woman to write to the senator of South Carolina, William P. Peacock, to encourage him to take action on woman's rights.

== Other contributions ==
Gridley started the Business and Professional Women's Club. She was involved in the founding of the Neblett Free Library in 1897, first public library in Greenville. Gridley also helped start up the Hopewell Tuberculosis Association.
