= Pavao =

Pavao may refer to:

- Pavao (given name), a Croatian name
- Pavão (disambiguation), a Portuguese name
