= Thomas Peacock =

Thomas Peacock may refer to:

- Thomas Peacock (businessman), South Australian businessman and politician
- Thomas Peacock (politician) (1837–1922), New Zealand politician
- Thomas Bevill Peacock (1812–1882), English physician
- Thomas Love Peacock (1785–1866), English author
- Tom Peacock (1912–?), English educator and footballer

== See also ==
- John Thomas Peacock (1827–1905), New Zealand politician
- Peacock (surname)
