= Doug Peacock (disambiguation) =

Doug Peacock may refer to:

- Doug Peacock, American outdoorsman
- Doug Peacock (Canadian politician), Canadian politician
- Douglas Peacock, co-founder of TransDigm Group
