= Pryce Peacocke =

Anglican priest

Pryce Peacocke was an Anglican priest in Ireland in the 19th century.

Peacocke was born in Limerick and educated at Trinity College, Dublin. He was Archdeacon of Limerick from 1861 until 1870.
