= Edward Peacock (antiquary) =

English antiquarian and novelist

Edward Peacock (22 December 1831 in Hemsworth – 31 March 1915) was an English antiquarian and novelist.

== Biography ==
Edward Peacock, the only son of the agriculturalist Edward Shaw Peacock (1793–1861), of Bottesford Manor, near Brigg, Lincolnshire, was educated by private tutors. Influenced by John Henry Newman, he converted to Catholicism as a young man. In 1853 he married Lucy Anne (died 1887), daughter of John S. Weatherall of New York City, a Captain in the United States Navy; they had seven children- their son, Max, and daughter, Mabel Peacock, also published works on the folklore of Lincolnshire. He lived at Bottesford Manor and Kirton-in-Lindsey, and in 1869 was appointed Justice of the Peace for the Parts of Lindsey. Their son Adrian was a clergyman and ecologist.

Peacock was elected Fellow of the Society of Antiquaries of London in 1857, and was a corresponding member of the New England Historic Genealogical Society (1858) and the Société des antiquaires de Normandie (1871) and a member of the Surtees Society, the Anthropological Institute, the English Dialect Society and the Early English Text Society. In the 1880s he served on the Committee of the London Library. A prolific contributor to James Murray's New English Dictionary, he also wrote contributions to antiquarian journals and other periodicals: the Archaeologia and Proceedings of the Society of Antiquaries, the Journal of the Royal Archaeological Institute, Notes and Queries, the Athenaeum and the Dublin Review. At the time of his death he left a biographical work of the known notable combatants of the English Civil War incomplete.

Peacock has been described as "one of the most durable contributors" to the first edition of the Oxford English Dictionary. One of the works which he used as a source for 51 original submission slips is a lost work called Meanderings of Memory; although the dictionary's current editors have been unable to find that work, the credibility of Peacock's other submissions has led them to assume that the book actually existed.

== Works ==
Antiquarian

- (ed.)The army lists of the Roundheads and Cavaliers, 1863
- English church furniture, ornaments and decorations, at the period of the Reformation : as exhibited in a List of the Goods destroyed in certain Lincolnshire churches, a.d. 1566, 1866
- (ed.) A list of the Roman Catholics in the county of York in 1604. Transcribed from the original ms. in the Bodleian library, 1872
- France, the empire, and civilization, 1873. (Published anonymously)
- A glossary of words used in the wapentakes of Manley and Corringham, Lincolnshire, 1877
- Index to English speaking students who have graduated at Leyden University, 1883
- Index to engravings in the "Proceedings of the Society of Antiquaries", 1885

Novels

- Ralf Skirlaugh, the Lincolnshire Squire, 3 vols, 1870
- Mabel Heron, 3 vols, 1872
- John Markenfield, 3 vols, 1874
- Narcissa Brendon, 2 vols, 1891
