= George Peacock (footballer) =

Australian rules footballer

Personal information
- Full name: George Peacock
- Born: 25 July 1881; St Kilda, Victoria
- Died: 23 April 1943 (aged 61); Glen Iris, Victoria
- Original team: Leopold

Playing career^{1}
Years	Club	Games (Goals)
1905–07	Melbourne	35 (11)
- ^{1} Playing statistics correct to the end of 1907.

George Peacock (25 July 1881 – 23 April 1943) was an Australian rules footballer who played with Melbourne in the Victorian Football League (VFL).
