= English Martyrs Catholic School =

English Martyrs' Catholic School
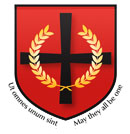

Location
- Anstey Lane; Leicester, Leicestershire, LE4 0FJ; England; 52°39′03″N 1°09′33″W

Information
- Type: Academy
- Motto: Ut omnes unum sint ("May they all be One" John 17:21)
- Religious affiliation: Roman Catholic
- Established: 1963
- Founder: Diocese of Nottingham
- Local authority: Leicester
- Department for Education URN: 146196 Tables
- Ofsted: Reports
- President: Bouffone
- Principal: Matthew Calen
- Chaplain: James Noakes
- Gender: Coeducational
- Age: 11 to 18
- Enrolment: 1050
- Houses: Campion, Clitheroe, Fisher, More, Sherwin, Ward, (Line, Alban for extra)
- Colours: Red, black & gold
- Publication: One! Magazine
- Website: www.englishmartyrs.org

English Martyrs Catholic School is a coeducational Roman Catholic secondary school and sixth form located in Leicester, England. The school's new buildings had their official opening in May 2015.

== History ==
The school began as a secondary school for 300 pupils on 14 April 1964. The land cost £4,250 for 3.5 acres (1.4 ha) and the building was £215,608 work commencing on 13 May 1963. The official opening was performed by Bishop Edward Ellis on Tuesday, 4 May 1965 followed by a reception by the Lord Mayor of Leicester, Alderman Kimberlin, OBE, one of the founding school governors. The school's first Headteacher was Mr. John Mulvey, with Deputy, Mr. P Connolly. Mr. Edward Brennan succeeded as Headmaster in 1966 and subsequent Heads have been Mr. David McLean in 1983, Mrs. Catherine Fields (Principal) 2002, Mr. Marius Carney 2007 and Mr. Mathew Calen 2022.

The school became a comprehensive school in 1976 and a new building costing £300,000 was erected to facilitate expansion and the opening of the Sixth Form. This building was dedicated and blessed by Bishop McGuiness on Thursday, 5 October 1978 assisted by Canon McReavy, Chair of Governors and Mr. Brennan the Headmaster.

The Chapel of the Holy Family, a basilica structure, was built in 1996 in memory of Sister Anna Sheils.

In 2013, the school began a major rebuilding program which involved the construction of new classrooms and a library; a sports centre (including a professional astro turf hockey pitch); a Sixth Form block and St Cecilia Performing Arts Centre. The buildings (costing £15m) were blessed by Bishop Alan Williams (Bishop of Brentwood) on the feast of the English Martyrs’ 2015, the fiftieth anniversary of the dedication of the school.

To mark the school's Golden Jubilee and the opening of the new buildings, the school commissioned a series of artworks. These are a bronze Crucifix erected at the entrance to the school by the Welsh artist, Helen Sinclair; an Icon of the Virgin Hodegetria by Aidan Hart; (card included) a cut slate plaque of the school motto "Ut omnes unum sint" by Lida Cordoza (Kindersley Cordoza Workshop, Cambridge); a choral setting of the school Prayer "Lord Jesus Christ make me a better person" by composer Simon Lole for the school's Schola Cantorum and a new two manual and pedal 16 rank pipe organ, built for the auditorium by Leicestershire Organ builder, Peter Collins.

Previously a voluntary aided school administered by Leicester City Council and the Roman Catholic Diocese of Nottingham, in September 2018 English Martyrs Catholic School converted to academy status. The school is now sponsored by the St Thomas Aquinas Catholic Multi-Academy trust.

== Campus ==
The Chapel, which is dedicated to the Holy Family, contains two stained glass windows one of the St John the Evangelist and the other The Annunciation. Both originally belonged to the congregation of the Sisters of St Joseph of Peace in Nottingham and were given by the sisters to Fr John Joe Maloney for the school. The Annunciation window is a memorial to Bishop Edward Bagshawe, the third Bishop of Nottingham (1874–1902). The chapel also contains a pipe organ by Wells Kennedy organ builders of Lisburn. Mass is celebrated weekly and Morning Prayer held each morning in the chapel.

Each building on campus is dedicated to a particular saint:

- St Jean Baptiste (Patron of teachers of youth)
- St Thomas Aquinas (Patron of students)
- St Cecilia (Patron of Music and Arts)
- St Sebastian (Patron of Sport)

St Mary of the Meadows. This dedication to Our Lady reflects the dedication of Leicester Abbey (dissolved in the reformation) which is a couple of miles from the school. The abbey was called Sancta Maria de Pratis (Our Lady of the Meadows). Tiles excavated by archaeologists from the floor of the abbey church were given to the school by Leicester University in 2015 and are displayed in the library. This room also contains a crucifix blessed by Bishop McGuiness when he opened the Sixth form in 1978 and a Christus given by Blessed Sacrament Church from the former home of the Blessed Sacrament fathers.

== Student body ==
The school has 1100 students aged 11–19. The student body is drawn from the west side of Leicester and serves nine parishes. Currently 85% of the school are Roman Catholic students.

== Academics and extracurriculars ==
The school specializes in the performing arts with a strong focus on music, especially music for the liturgy.

The school has a very active performing arts enrichment program which includes many community arts events. An annual arts festival is held each July each year.

== Rankings ==
In 2009 the school was judged by the Department for Children, Schools and Families to be one of the Top 200 Most Improved Schools in England.

In 2014, Ofsted rated the school as Good with Outstanding features and the Sixth Form as Outstanding. The Sixth Form is also in the top 10% of Sixth Forms nationally.

In 2022 the school ranked 15th among East Midlands schools.

== Notable former pupils ==
- Julie Etchingham (ITN Newscaster)
- Matt Lloyd (Paralympian) (Ice Sledge Hockey)
- Rendall Munroe (International Super bantam-weight boxer)
- David Wells (Catholic Catechist, Teacher and Author)David Wells at RP Books
- David O'Malley SDB (S.D.B Priest and Vice Provincial of the Salesian order)
