= Peacock Mountain =

Mountain in Washington (state), United States

Coordinates: 48.5149°N 119.7576°W

Peacock Mountain is a summit in Okanogan County, Washington, in the United States. With an elevation of 4,442 feet (1,354 m), Peacock Mountain is the 1674th highest summit in the state of Washington.

Peacock Mountain took its name from nearby Peacock Mine.
