= James Peacock (architect) =

English architect and surveyor

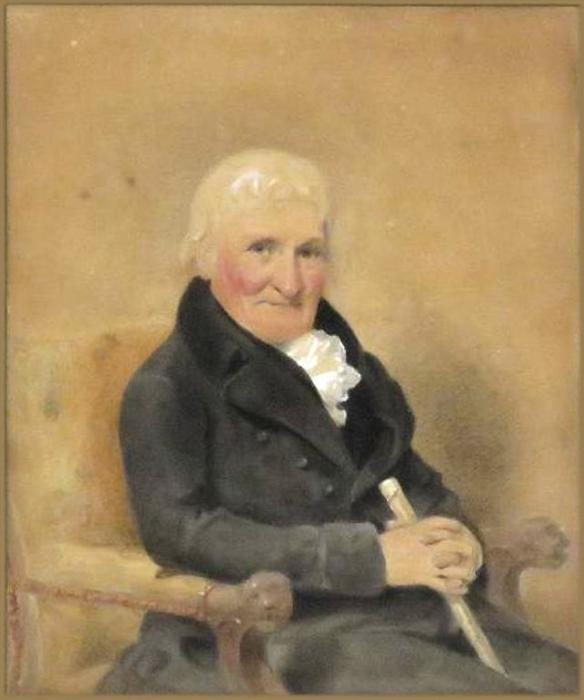
Portrait of James Peacock by William Nicholson, inscribed on the reverse: "Mr Peacock/Architect/by/Mr Nicholson R.S.A" (n.d.)

James Peacock (1735/1738–1814) was an English architect and surveyor. He practised in London and wrote on architecture and social problems, his main project being to find employment for the destitute.

== Life ==
James Peacock, born about 1738, became assistant to George Dance the Younger when Dance was appointed architect and surveyor to the City of London at Guildhall. He retained his post for 'nearly 45 years', and was also employed by Dance in his private practice. Finsbury Square (1777–1791) was a result of their joint labours, and at No. 17 Peacock himself lived and died. His former residence was at Coleman Street Buildings. In 1801–2 Peacock designed the first Stock Exchange in Capel Court, and he "restored and preserved" St. Stephen's, Walbrook. There is also a drawing by him in the King's collection, British Museum, of the elevation of the Mines Royal, Dowgate Hill.

He died on 22 February 1814, "universally beloved and respected", "in his seventy-ninth year", according to the Gentleman's Magazine; but according to the inscription on the tombstone in the back cemetery of St. Luke's, Old Street, he was in his seventy-sixth year.

== Publications ==
Peacock published a few books connected with his professional studies. These were Oikidia, a little tract containing plans for houses, London, 1785, 8vo, published under the pseudonym of Jose Mac Packe; A new Method of Filtration by Ascent, London, 1793, 4to; and Subordinates in Architecture, London, 1814, 4to. He also contributed An Account of Three Simple Instruments for Drawing Architecture and Machinery in Perspective, printed in the Philosophical Transactions for 1785.

Peacock was also interested in economic and social problems, and his treatises on these subjects, small as they are, are, in the estimation of the Dictionary of National Biography, more remarkable than his architectural works. His Outlines of a Scheme for the General Relief, Instruction, Employment, and Maintenance of the Poor was published in 1777, and is described by Peacock as "an imperfect and crude performance". in another tract entitled Proposals for a Magnificent and Interesting Establishment, London, 1790, 8vo. In 1789 he published Superior Politics, and in 1798 The Outlines of a Plan for establishing a United Company of British Manufacturers. All of these tracts set forth, with various modifications, Peacock's main project of "giving protection and suitable incitement, encouragement, and employ to every class of the destitute, ignorant, and idle poor who shall be healthy, able to work, and willing to conform … to such … regulations as the company shall enact, and which are intended to be of mutual benefit and advantage to the company and the workpeople, and eventually so to society at large". Peacock asserts that "very considerable use has been made of the original thoughts" in his two earlier pamphlets by several writers, and refers to the first two reports of the Philanthropic Society, which was a flourishing and important institution.

Besides these published works, Peacock wrote a folio volume, in manuscript, preserved in the Soane Museum, on Terms of Contracts for Bricklayers', Slaters', and Joiners' Works, on the Peace Establishment, for the Service of the Board of Ordnance.

== Gallery ==
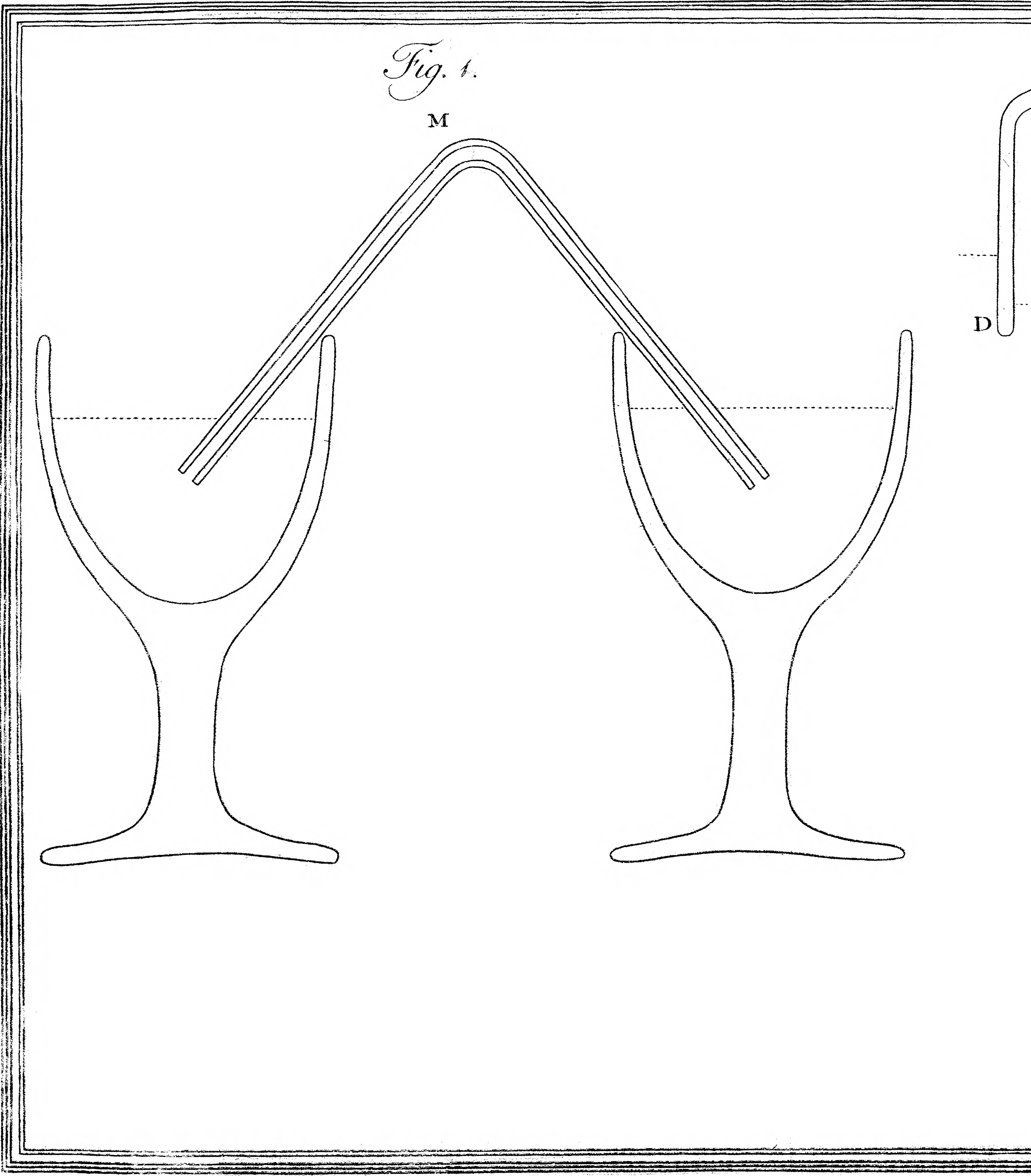
Fig. 1.

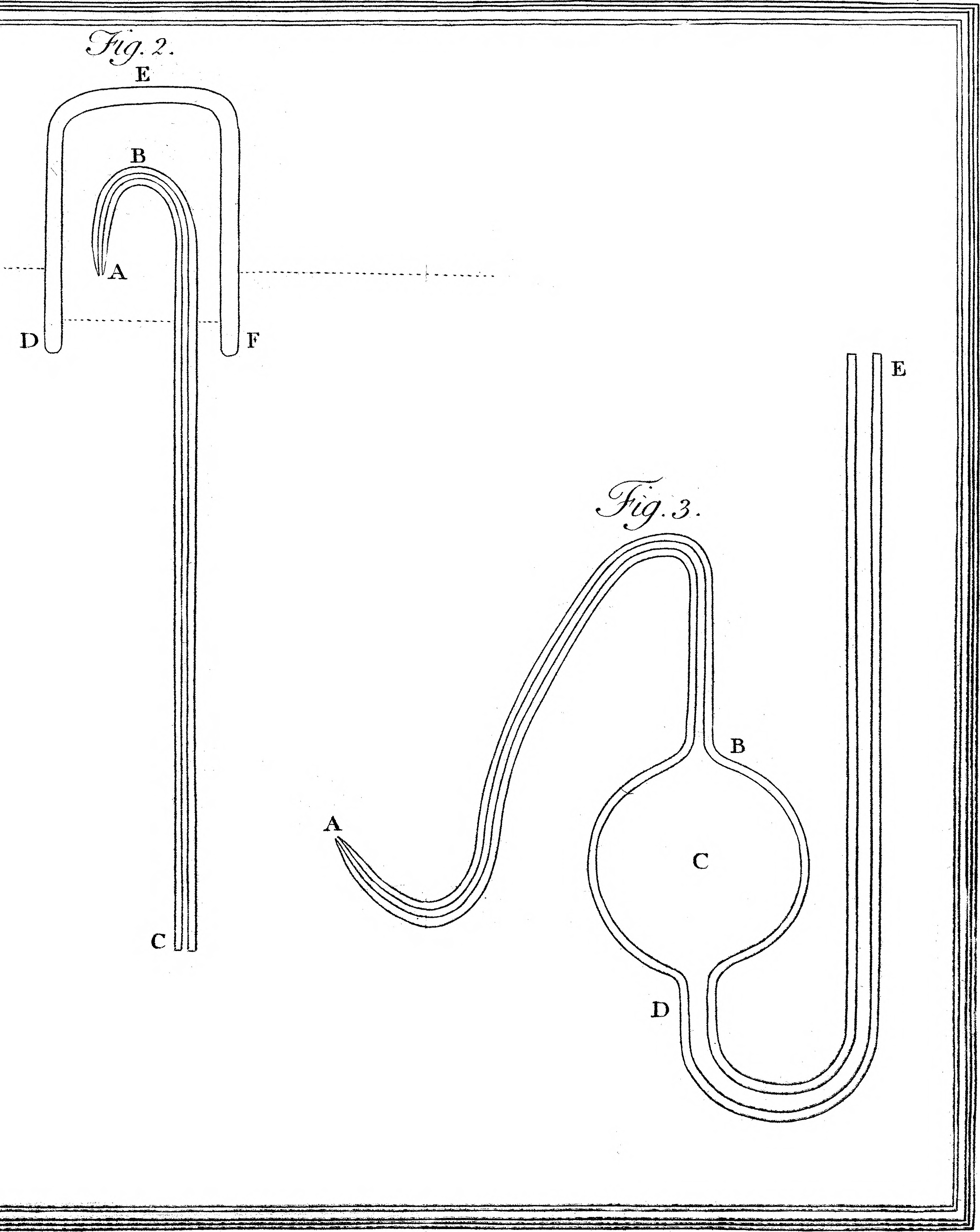
Fig. 2.

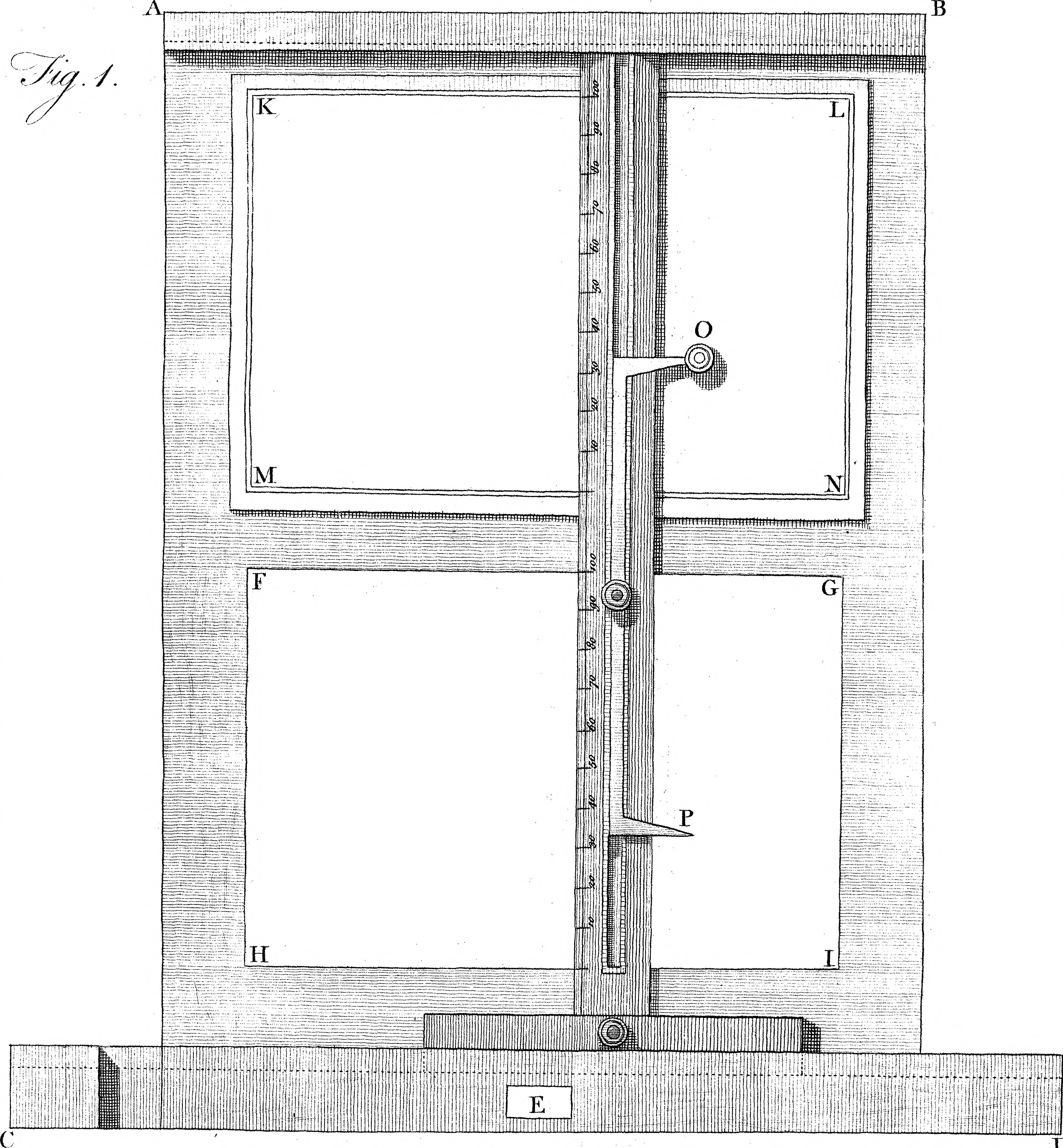
Fig. 1.
Sketches and Descriptions of Three Simple Instruments for Drawing Architecture and Machinery in Perspective. By Mr. James Peacock; Communicated by Robert Mylne, Esq. F.R.S. (1785)

== Sources ==
- Binyon, Laurence; Richardson, Margaret (2004). "Peacock, James (1735/1738–1814), architect and surveyor". Oxford Dictionary of National Biography. Oxford UP. Retrieved 7 September 2022.
- Urban, Sylvanus [Edward Cave], ed. (January–June 1814). "Obituary; with Anecdotes of remarkable Persons". In The Gentleman's Magazine, Vol. 84, Part 1. London: Nichols, Son, and Bentley. p. 411.

Attribution:

- This article incorporates text from a publication now in the public domain: Binyon, Laurence (1895). "Peacock, James (1738?-1814)". In Lee, Sidney (ed.). Dictionary of National Biography. Vol. 44. London: Smith, Elder & Co. p. 142.
