= Richard Peacock (disambiguation) =

Richard Peacock (1820–1889) is an English engineer.

Richard Peacock may also refer to:

- Richard Peacock (footballer) (born 1972), English footballer
- Richard Peacock (sailor), 2000 silver medallist in the Topper world championships
- Richard Peacock, sometime Lord of the Manor of Totteridge
