= George Peacock (captain) =

English sea captain and shipowner (1805–1883)

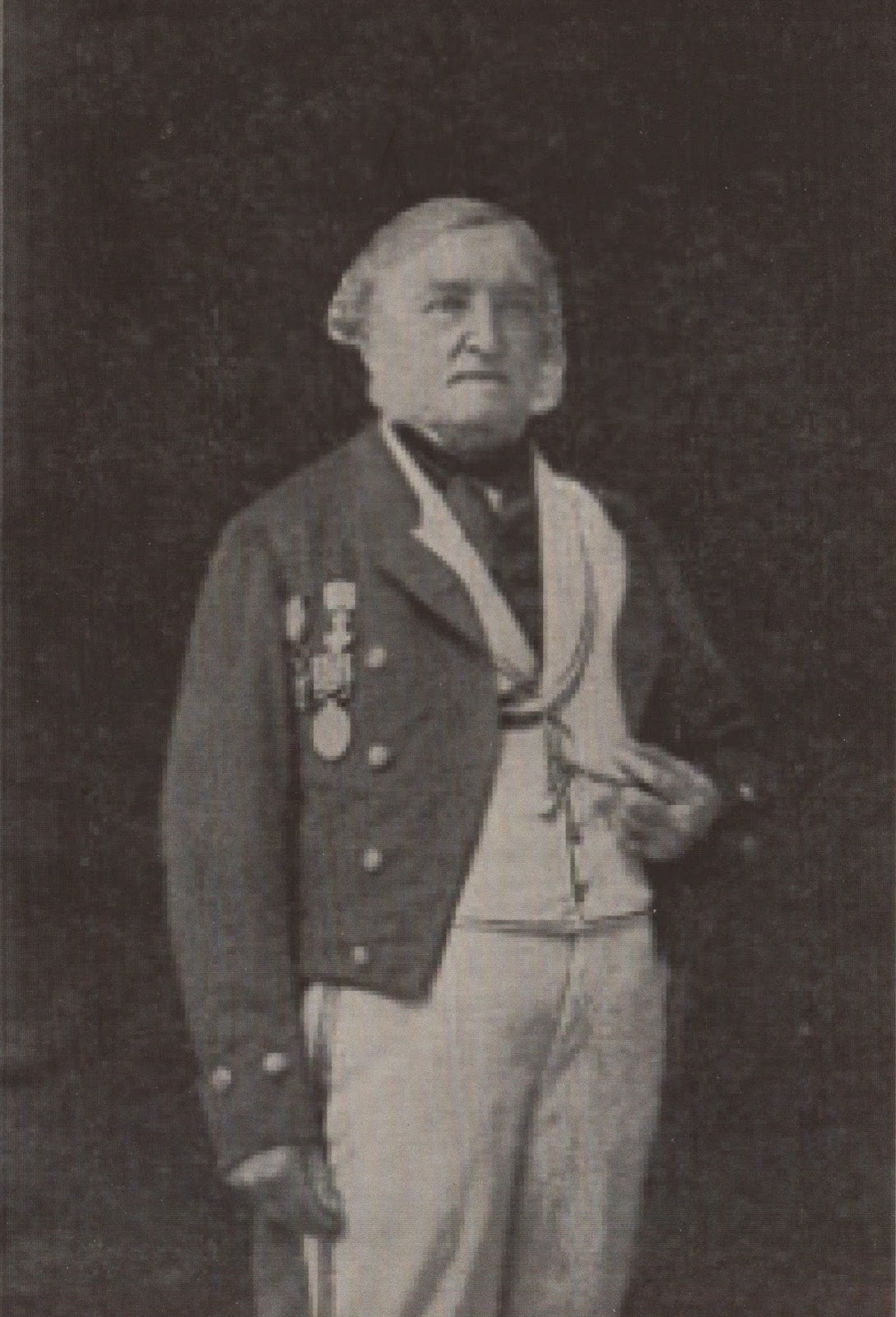
- Born: 1805; Starcross, England
- Died: 6 June 1883 (aged 77–78)
- Occupations: Sea captain and shipowner

George Peacock (1805 – 6 June 1883) was an English sea captain and shipowner.

== Biography ==
Peacock born in 1805 at Starcross, near Exeter. He was son of Richard George Peacock, a master in the navy, who had served with Sir Alexander Cochrane in the West Indies, and with Thomas, lord Cochrane, afterwards tenth earl of Dundonald. After the peace his father owned and commanded ships trading to the Mediterranean and Brazil, and young Peacock served his apprenticeship with him, rising gradually to command a ship on a voyage to the Pacific. In 1828 he entered the navy as second master of the steamer Echo, employed in surveying the lower Thames. In the next year he went out to the West Indies in the Winchester, and in March 1831 was appointed acting-master of the Magnificent, from which he exchanged into the Hyacinth as a sea-going ship. While in the Hyacinth he surveyed the harbour of San Juan de Nicaragua, his chart of which, with later corrections, is still in use. He also, in an official letter, pointed out the advantages of the route across the isthmus from San Juan, and recommended Colon, then known as Victor Cove, as a terminus for a railway. He seems to have persuaded himself that in this he made an original discovery; but the routes he recommended were known to the Spaniards from the earliest times, and in after years to Francis Drake, Henry Morgan, and the later buccaneers. On 21 September 1835 Peacock was confirmed as master of the Medea steamer in the Mediterranean, and, while serving on the coast of Greece, made a survey of the isthmus of Corinth, marking the line of a possible canal. A copy of this he presented to the Greek government, in acknowledgment of which the king of Greece in 1882 conferred on him the order of the Redeemer of Greece; at the time, however, in 1836, King Otho, paying a visit to the Medea, presented Peacock with a gold snuffbox.

In 1838, being then master of the Andromache, Peacock surveyed and buoyed the harbours of Charlotte-town and Three-rivers in Prince Edward Island. In 1840 he applied to be appointed to the Blenheim, then going to China; his application was refused, and, being offered the command of the steamers of the newly constituted Pacific Steam Navigation Company, he resigned his warrant in the navy. He superintended the building and equipment of the steamers, and himself commanded the first that went out, which he took through the Strait of Magellan. For the next five years he acted as the company's marine superintendent, and claimed to have during this time laid down buoys, erected beacons, built a lighthouse, surveyed harbours, opened and worked coal-mines, discovered new guano-beds, suggested railways, and brought the first regular mails from Valparaiso to Panama. In 1846 he returned to England, and seems to have been busy for the next two years in carrying out experiments with an anti-fouling composition for the bottoms of iron ships, for the manufacture of which he started a company in 1848, under the style of Peacock & Buchan. In 1848 he accepted an appointment as dockmaster at Southampton, the title of which office was afterwards changed to superintendent of the docks. He held this till 1858, when he retired to Starcross, and carried on business there as a shipowner.

In 1859 he vainly memorialised the admiralty with a view to having his name reinstated on the list of masters. He printed the memorial, letters, and certificates, under the title of ‘Official Correspondence.’ In 1860 he commanded an unsuccessful expedition, under the patronage of Napoleon III, for the discovery of ‘nitrates’ in the Sahara, the idea being, apparently, that they were the natural concomitants of sandy desert. In 1873 he took out a patent for chain cables of a specified pattern, in connection with which he published ‘A Treatise on Ships' Cables, with the History of Chains, their Use and Abuse’ (cr. 8vo). He wrote many other pamphlets, among which may be named ‘The Resources of Peru …’ (cr. 8vo, 1874), which ran through four editions within six months; ‘On the Supply of Nitrate of Soda and Guano from Peru, with the History of their first Introduction into this Country’ (cr. 8vo, 1878); ‘Notes on the Isthmus of Panama and Darien;’ ‘The Guinea, or Gold Coast of Africa, the veritable Ophir of Scripture.’ He died on 6 June 1883, in the house of his son-in-law, Henry Cookson of Liverpool, and was buried at Starcross.
