= Adrian Woodruffe-Peacock =

English clergyman and ecologist

The Reverend Adrian Woodruffe-Peacock FLS FGS
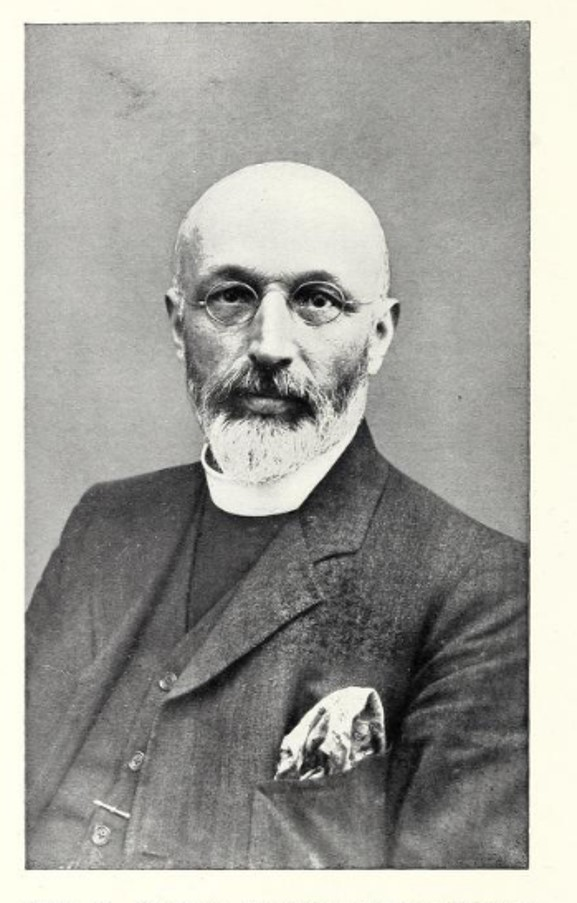
- Born: Edward Adrian Woodruffe-Peacock; 23 July 1858; Bottesford Manor, Lincolnshire, England
- Died: 3 February 1922 (aged 63); Grayingham, Lincolnshire, England
- Education: St John's College, Cambridge; Hatfield College, Durham

Edward Adrian Woodruffe-Peacock (23 July 1858 – 3 February 1922) was an English clergyman and ecologist.

He was an early exponent of the ecological approach to natural history recording.

== Early life and education ==
Woodruffe-Peacock was born at Bottesford Manor in north Lincolnshire on 23 July 1858, the son of Edward Peacock (1831–1915), a farmer, antiquary and author, and Lucy Ann Wetherell (1823–1887). He had six siblings, one of whom was the folklorist Mabel Peacock.

He was educated at Edinburgh Academy from 1870 to 1873 and briefly at St Peter's School, York, before receiving private tuition back home in Lincolnshire. In April 1877 he entered St John's College, Cambridge, where he studied mathematics, classics, science and natural history. However, financial difficulties, poor health and his decision to enter the Anglican ministry led him to leave without taking a degree.

In 1879 he transferred to Bishop Hatfield's Hall at Durham University. At Durham, he indulged in extensive botanising, boating, and tennis; his social life being so time-consuming that there were complaints he treated the university as a private club.

He obtained his licentiate in theology in December 1880 and was ordained deacon in 1881 and then priest in 1883. He served successive curacies at Longbenton, Northumberland (1881–84 and 1885–86), Barkingside, Essex (1884–85), and finally Harrington, Northamptonshire (1886–90).

== Ecology ==
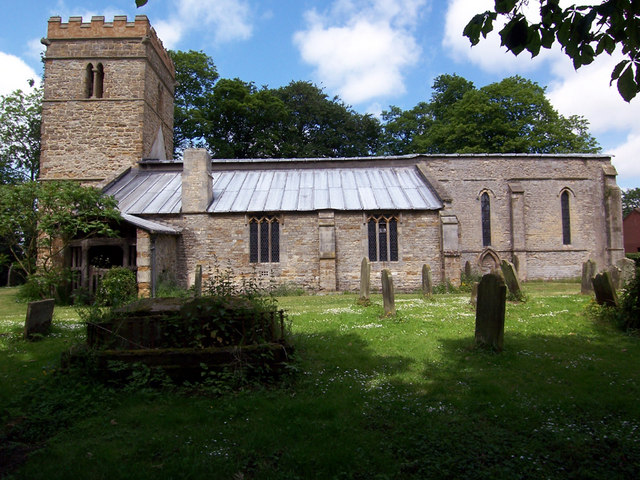
The Church of All Saints, Cadney

In 1891 he accepted the living at Cadney, 10 miles from his birthplace, where he stayed until 1920 and developed a reputation as a naturalist. This was a poor, sparsely populated parish; since Woodruffe-Peacock had to visit his widely scattered parishioners on foot, he became by inclination and necessity a "tremendous walker", which afforded him the opportunity to make regular observations and to record the natural changes occurring over a limited area.

His profile in the Oxford Dictionary of National Biography notes that his routes contained some of the best observed and documented habitats in the country.

Woodruffe-Peacock compiled a Critical Catalogue of Lincolnshire Plants (1894–1900), superseded by his Check-List of Lincolnshire Plants (1909), allegedly based on an analysis of half a million observations. In compiling the checklist he worked with Selina Catherine Stow and James Britten among others.

He took a leading role in the foundation of the Lincolnshire Naturalists' Union in 1893, serving as organizing secretary in 1895 and president in 1905. He was the prime mover in establishing a museum for Lincolnshire, his extensive herbarium forming an integral part of its original collections and the foundation of the city and county museum's herbarium. He was elected a fellow of both the Linnean Society and the Geological Society in 1895.

Among his achievements was the pioneering of the small-scale ecological survey. He also appreciated the mechanisms of dispersal, a neglected aspect of British ecology, which he approached through the careful study of microhabitats. As the result of "half a dozen visits" to a Lincolnshire beck during a dry summer when the water was low, he noted over 58 species growing, coming from the seeds he had dispersed by the stream. He was also a pioneer in plotting the distribution of plants. As early as 1894 he had 20,000 "place notes" on the distribution of plant species tabulated in his "Locality Register".

He published an article, "A fox-covert study" in the Journal of Ecology, recently founded by botanist Arthur Tansley. The two eventually met on a field trip to Mildenhall in Suffolk and, surprisingly, since Tansley was an avowed atheist, became close friends. By this point Woodruffe-Peacock had been working on a detailed study, Rock-soil flora of Lincolnshire, for many years, and Tansley, impressed, offered to contribute £300 towards its publication.

Owing to poor health, Woodruffe-Peacock was never able to make the necessary revisions and only a small section was ever published, the rest of the manuscript passing into the archives of Cambridge University Library. According to Brian J. Ford, these extensive notes show him to be "ahead of his time" in his approach to natural history.

== Personal ==
Woodruffe-Peacock suffered for much of his life from chronic hay fever and rheumatism.

In 1920, by now Rector of Grayingham, he suffered an emotional setback when his sister Mabel died. A combination of this, the pressures of his new appointment, and the disappointment of his magnum opus requiring so many revisions, saw his health break down. He died on 3 February 1922 and was buried in an unmarked grave beside his sister.

== Selected publications ==
=== Books and pamphlets ===
- Woodruffe-Peacock, E. Adrian (1898). The Natural History of Lincolnshire: Being the Natural History Section of Lincolnshire Notes & Queries, from January, 1896, to October, 1897. Horncastle: W. K. Morton.
- ——— (1904). How to Make Notes for a Rock-Soil Flora: A Lecture. Rural Studies Series. Louth: J. W. Goulding and Son.
- ——— (1909). A Check-List of Lincolnshire Plants. Louth: J. W. Goulding and Son.

=== Journal articles ===
- ——— (1918). "A Fox-Covert Study". Journal of Ecology. 6 (2): 110–125. doi:10.2307/2255362. JSTOR 2255362.
