= Shane Peacock =

Shane Peacock may refer to:

- Shane Peacock (writer) (born 1957), Canadian novelist
- Shane Peacock (ice hockey) (born 1973), Canadian ice hockey player
- Shane Peacock (fashion designer), Indian fashion designer and judge of the Femina Miss India 2019 pageant
