= Joe Peacock =

English footballer

Personal information
- Full name: John Peacock
- Date of birth: 15 March 1897
- Place of birth: Ince-in-Makerfield, England
- Date of death: 4 March 1979 (aged 81)
- Place of death: Wigan, England
- Height: 5 ft 9 in (1.75 m)
- Position: Left half

Senior career*
Years	Team	Apps	(Gls)
- Wigan Recreation
- Atherton
1919–1927	Everton	151	(12)
1927–1930	Middlesbrough	80	(2)
1930–1931	Sheffield Wednesday	1	(0)
1931–1933	Clapton Orient		
Total		232+	(14+)

International career
1929	England	3	(0)
- * Club domestic league appearances and goals

John "Joe" Peacock (15 March 1897 – 4 March 1979) was an English football player and coach who played as a left half.

== Early life ==
Born in Ince-in-Makerfield, Peacock was the eldest of four children. by 1911 he was working as a driller in an iron works.

== Career ==
Peacock played for Wigan Recreation and Atherton, before signing for Everton in June 1919. He later played for Middlesbrough, Sheffield Wednesday, and Clapton Orient. He won the Division Two championship in the 1928-29 season, and was a FA Charity Shield runners-up in 1930.

He earned three caps for England in 1929.

After leaving Clapton Orient in 1933 he became a coach in Sweden. He later worked as assistant manager for Port Vale and as a trainer for Wrexham.

== Later life and death ==
By 1939 Peacock was a milly machinist in the motor trade. He died in Wigan on 4 March 1979, aged 81.
