= Mabel Peacock =

English folklorist (1856–1920)

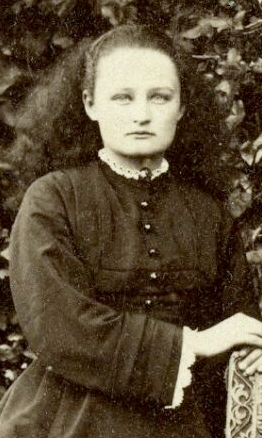
- Mabel Peacock, from an 1873 photograph in the collection of the North Lincolnshire Museum
- Born: 9 May 1856; Brigg, Lincolnshire, U.K.
- Died: 17 July 1920 (age 64); Kirton in Lindsey, U.K.
- Occupation(s): Writer, folklorist
- Father: Edward Peacock
- Relatives: Adrian Woodruffe-Peacock (brother)

Mabel Geraldine Woodruffe Peacock (9 May 1856– 17 July 1920) was an English folklorist and writer, best known for her books of folk stories and poems of Lincolnshire.

== Early life ==
Peacock was one of the seven children born to antiquarian Edward Peacock and Lucy Peacock, of Bottesford Manor, Brigg, Lincolnshire, and later of Kirton in Lindsey. Her brother Adrian was a noted ecologist.

== Publications ==
Peacock published several collections of folklore, mainly stories and poems collected in Lincolnshire. Noting the publication of her 1897 book of folk tales, the Hull Daily Mail noted that "Miss Peacock's two previous books are well known in Lincolnshire for their pathos and humour." Peacock also edited a reprint of John Bunyan's Holy War and Heavenly Footman (1892), with full introduction and notes, and she was a contributor to the journals Folk-Lore and The Naturalist.

- An Index of Royalists whose estates were confiscated during the Commonwealth (1879)
- Tales and Rhymes in the Lindsey Folk-speech (1886)
- Tales fra Linkisheere (1889)
- "Omens of Death" (1897, Folk-Lore)
- Lincolnshire Tales: The Recollections of Eli Twigg (1897)
- "The Calenig or Gift" (1902, Folk-Lore)
- "St. Mark's Eve (April 24th)" (1903, Folk-Lore)
- Lincolnshire Rhymes (1907)
- Lincolnshire County Folklore (1908, edited with Eliza Gutch)
- "Amulets Used in Lincolnshire" (1908, Folk-Lore)
- "Death-knock in the Wapentake of Corringham, Lincolnshire" (1908, Folk-Lore)
- "Religious Dancing" (1910, Folk-Lore)

== Personal life and legacy ==
Peacock and her sister assisted and cared for their father until he died in 1915. Mabel Peacock died in Kirton Lindsey from tuberculosis in 1920, at the age of 64. Mabel Peacock is buried in Grayingham, Lincolnshire churchyard. In Folklore, William Crooke recalled Peacock as a "keen naturalist and county lover, with a lively play of humour." The Peacock Family Archive in the North Lincolnshire Museum holds Mabel Peacock's papers as well as her father's.

Peacock is among the favorite authors of Sir George Bailey in A. S. Byatt's novel, Possession (1991). In 1998, a new edition of The Peacock Lincolnshire Word Books, 1884-1920, originally edited by Mabel Peacock and her brother Maximillian, were edited by Eileen Elder and published by the Scunthorpe Museum Society.
