= John Michael Peacock =

South African politician (c. 1831-?)

John Michael Peacock MLA, MLC
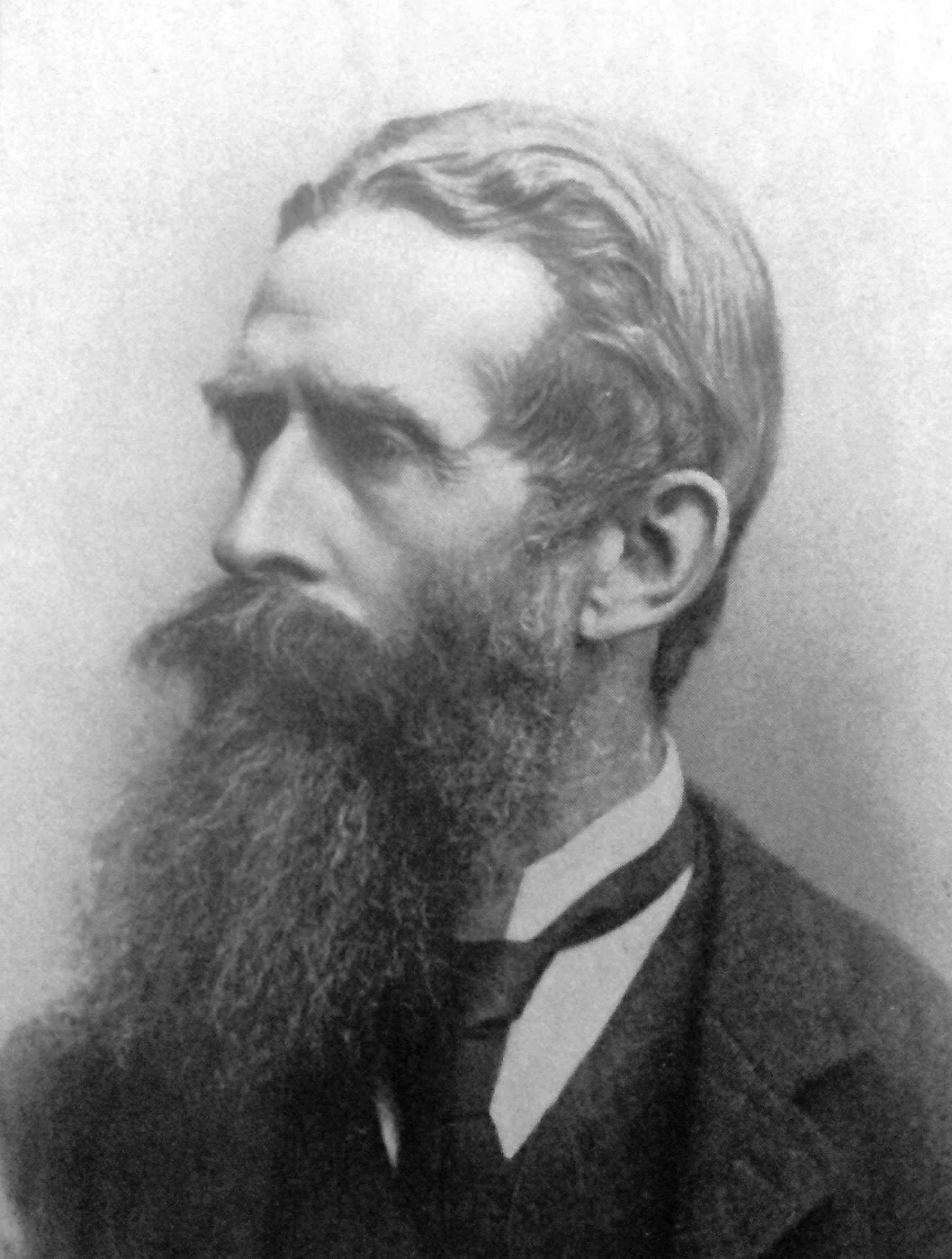
- Mr Peacock. Cape Colony political leader and frontiersman

Member of the Cape Parliament for King Williams Town
- In office 1874–1877

Personal details
- Born: baptised 14 March 1831 Manchester, England

John Michael Peacock MLA, MLC (c. 1831 – ) was a prominent "border man" and a member of the Legislative Assembly and Legislative Council of the Cape Colony Parliament in South Africa.

== Biography ==
Born in Manchester, England, the son of draper George and Hannah Peacock, he emigrated to the Cape Colony in 1861, and started his business in the eastern frontier of the Cape, in King Williams Town and then in Queenstown. In 1867 he married Maria Kentish Hincksman (d.1888), daughter of a cotton spinner TC Hincksman from Preston, England, and they had a large family.

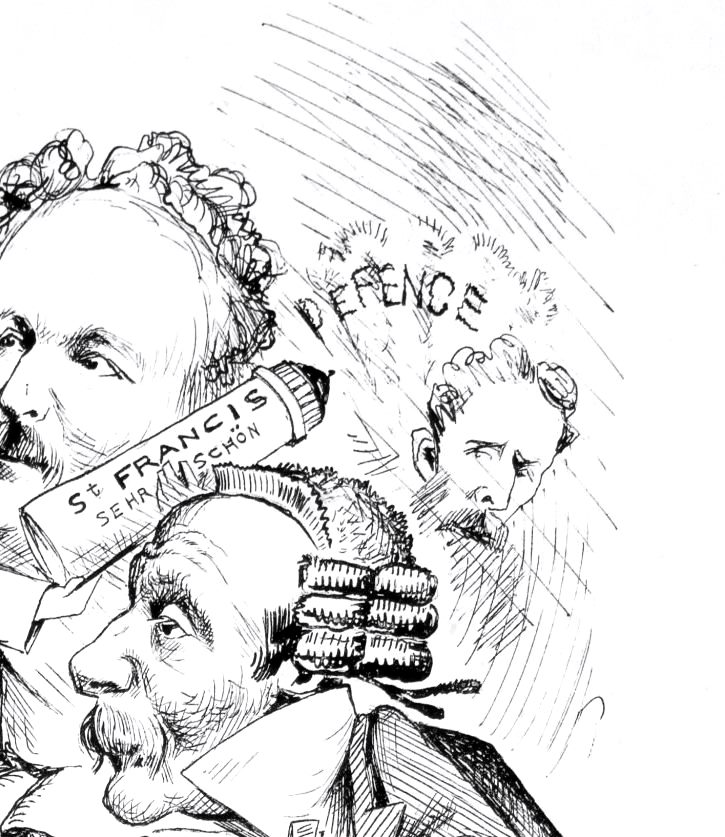
Mr Peacock caricatured in the Zingari newspaper (Aug 1874)

=== MLA (1874-1877) ===
He represented King Williams Town in the General Assembly (lower house) of the Cape Parliament from 1874 until 1877. He also served on that town's council. He was one of the first officers in the Kaffrarian Volunteers, and was a leader of the movement which opposed the dis-annexation of British Kaffraria by the Cape Colony.

=== Diplomatic agent in England (1877-1889) ===
After he resigned his seat in Parliament, he returned to England for a while. While there, he was appointed by the Cape Prime Minister Thomas Charles Scanlen to be a Member of the Council of Advice to the Agent General. Here he also kept a close eye on the interests of the Cape frontier region, especially its principal shipping port, East London.

=== MLC (1891-1898) ===
When he returned to the Cape in 1889, he settled in Addiscombe, Queenstown. He represented the Eastern Circle (Province) in the Legislative Council (upper house) of the Cape Parliament from 1891 until 1898.
