= William D. Peacock =

- Born: 1933
- Died: 1998 (aged 64–65)
- Other names: Bill Peacock; Elmer Wildblood
- Citizenship: First Nations
- Occupation: Newspaper publisher

William D. Peacock (1933–1998), known professionally as Bill Peacock, was a Canadian newspaper publisher. In 1984, he published the first Native newspaper in Calgary, Alberta under the pseudonym Elmer Wildblood. It was also the first independently owned and operated Native newspaper in Canada.

== Background ==
In 1983, at the age of 50 years, the Toronto native of English and Ojibwa heritage was described as a "reformed drunk" who had been in and out of trouble with the law and with women for much of his life. It was around 1980 that Peacock, then a typesetter at the North Hill News Ltd., a web offset printer in Calgary, contemplated publishing an independent Native newspaper. He continued to speak of it while working at his own Calgary print shop, and his dream was realized in August 1984, when he produced the first monthly issue of The Native Albertan: An Independent Native Newspaper.

== The Native Albertan ==
The premier issue of the 12-page tabloid was published in Calgary by Peacock's Tomahawk Graphics, with Peacock serving as publisher and editor and Helen Wigglesworth as advertising executive director. The paper aimed to serve "the Native and Métis Population" of Calgary and environs, and appeared three years after the founding of Tim Giago's pioneering independent American Native newspaper, Lakota Times of Pine Ridge, South Dakota.

Writing in the first issue on "Indian Solidarity," Peacock explained: "Except for a few, all of North America's Native papers are funded by tribal, state or federal governments, and this in turn has a detrimental effect on news content." The goal of The Native Albertan, according to its first editorial, was in part to change the "present-day image of the Indian." It proposed to "treat every point of view on its merits... Its sole goal will be to improve the lot of our people, and at the same time to remain loyal to our Elders, our culture, and our heritage."

Peacock continued publishing The Native Albertan until at least December 1985.

== Death ==
After suffering from cancer for six months, Peacock died in September 1998.
