= Pavão =

Pavão may refer to:

== Places ==
- Pavão, Minas Gerais, a municipality in Brazil
- Vila Pavão, Espírito Santo, a municipality in Brazil
- Figueira Pavão, a settlement in the island of Fogo in Cape Verde

== People ==
- Pavão (footballer, born 1947), Portuguese footballer
- Pavão (footballer, born 1974), Brazilian footballer
- Pavão (basketball) (born 1917), Brazilian basketball player

== See also ==
- Pavao (disambiguation)
