= Johnny Peacock (American football) =

American football player (born 1947)

No. 44
- Position: Defensive back

Personal information
- Born: March 2, 1947 (age 79); Austin, Texas, U.S.
- Listed height: 6 ft 1 in (1.85 m)
- Listed weight: 200 lb (91 kg)

Career information
- High school: Goliad (Goliad, Texas)
- College: Houston (1965–1968)
- NFL draft: 1969: 5th round, 118th overall pick

Career history
- Houston Oilers (1969–1970); New England Patriots (1972)*
- * Offseason or practice squad member only

Awards and highlights
- Third-team All-American (1968)

Career NFL/AFL statistics
- Interceptions: 5
- Fumble recoveries: 2
- Touchdowns: 2
- Sacks: 1
- Stats at Pro Football Reference

Johnny Byron Peacock (born March 2, 1947) is an American former professional football player who was a defensive back for two seasons with the Houston Oilers. He was selected by the Oilers in the fifth round of the 1969 NFL/AFL draft after playing college football for the Houston Cougars.

== Early life and college ==
Johnny Byron Peacock was born on March 2, 1947, in Austin, Texas. He attended Goliad High School in Goliad, Texas.

Peacock was a member of the Houston Cougars of the University of Houston from 1965 to 1968 and a three-year letterman from 1966 to 1968. He was named an Associated Press third-team All-American his senior year in 1968.

== Professional career ==
Peacock was selected by the Houston Oilers in the fifth round, with the 118th overall pick, of the 1969 NFL/AFL draft. He played in all 14 games, starting five, during his rookie year in 1969, intercepting two passes for 56 yards while also returning one fumble recovery 27 yards for a touchdown. He also appeared in, and started, one playoff game that year, recording an interception. Peacock started all 14 games for the Oilers in 1970, totaling three interceptions for 24 yards, one sack, and one 41-yard fumble recovery touchdown. The Oilers finished the season with a 3–10–1 record. He was released in 1971.

Peacock signed a futures contract with the New England Patriots in 1972, but was later released.
