= Ian Peacock =

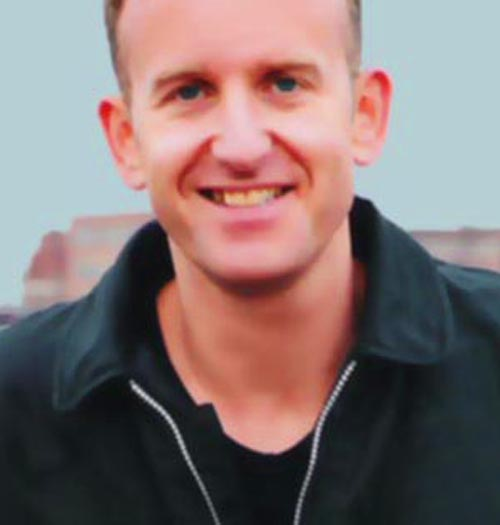
- Ian Peacock in 2000
- Born: Ian Geoffrey Peacock; 14 December 1962 (age 63); Newcastle upon Tyne, England
- Occupations: Radio presenter, writer

Ian Peacock (born 14 December 1962) is a radio presenter and writer. He has appeared regularly on BBC Radio 4 since the late 1980s. Described as "a natural broadcaster" by The Observer, he has a Gold Sony Award for feature-making (Radio Academy Awards). He was named by The Independent as a 'Media Star 2006' – one of the media people who would "have the most impact" over the year.

== Early life ==
Ian Peacock was born in Westerhope, a village in Northumberland to the west of Newcastle upon Tyne.

His radio career began unexpectedly in 1976 when he was aged 14. During work experience at BBC Newcastle, presenter Frank Wappat lost his voice and asked him to present part of his afternoon show.

He graduated in 1984 with a first class degree in English literature, followed by a PGCE. While at Cambridge University, he presented a student programme and outside broadcasts for BBC Radio Cambridgeshire.

After graduating, he lived in Valais in Switzerland and Innsbruck in Austria, working as a tourist rep. He also spent a term at Salzburg University studying literary German.

== Broadcasting career ==
At BBC Radio Cambridgeshire, Peacock produced and presented a weekly arts programme and made features for news programmes.

While at BBC Radio Cambridgeshire, he produced John Peel. He also reported for BBC Radio 4 programmes such as PM, Kaleidoscope (UK radio series),You and Yours and Today (BBC Radio 4). His first Today Programme feature was about the rise of the Sloane Ranger. He then became a reporter on The AM Alternative presented by Johnnie Walker on BBC Radio 5.

In the early 1990s, he produced documentaries for BBC Radio 1, such as Pinkpop, which was the BBC's first ever programme about gay pop music, presented by Laurie Pike. While making programmes for Radio 1, he interviewed Take That, Mark Wahlberg and East 17.

Peacock went on to report on Radio 4 programmes such as The Afternoon Shift with Laurie Taylor, Front Row, Word of Mouth, Home Truths, All in the Mind and Loose Ends.

Ian Peacock has presented numerous documentaries and series for BBC Radio 4, such as Revenge, Memories Are Made of This, Every Breath You Take, Think About It, Tales of Cats and Comets, Tripping The Light Fantastic, The Art of Indecision, The Secret Life of Phone Numbers, Lady Curzon and a Pineapple, From Arial To Wide Latin, Creative Genius, It Was A Dark And Stormy Night, Remembrance of Smells Past, Tempus Fugit, Cache in Pocket, We Were Here – How To Make Your Own Time Capsule, In Search of Originality and the first ever radio feature about Nothing.

He has interviewed many prominent personalities such as Tony Blair, Barbara Cartland, Stephen Hawking, Bob Hope, Spike Milligan, Oliver Reed, Seamus Heaney, JK Galbraith and Robbie Williams, and has reported from Paris, Athens, Kathmandu, Luxor, New York City and Los Angeles.

Peacock has also reported for BBC Television, recorded adverts for Saatchi and Saatchi and presented voiceovers for the BBC and corporate clients.

From 1998 to 2014, Peacock taught at the BBC Academy. He was lead trainer on courses such as Writing for Radio, Managing your Presenter and Advanced Features. He also carried out voice training for presenters.

As a media trainer, his clients have included Chatham House, Jordans (company), the Home Office, Bournemouth University and the Thai Ministry of Foreign Affairs.

Peacock has taught at the University of Cambridge, the University of Westminster and the University of Brighton where he was a Visiting Lecturer in Broadcast Media. He has also chaired events at the BBC, Design Museum and the Onassis Cultural Center in Athens.

He has written for various national publications, ranging from Men's Health to The Times.

== Personal life ==
Ian Peacock lives in Manchester with his dog Eddie.
