= John Peacock (footballer) =

English footballer and manager

Personal information
- Full name: John Charles Peacock
- Date of birth: 27 March 1956 (age 70)
- Place of birth: Leeds, England
- Height: 1.75 m (5 ft 9 in)
- Position: Full back

Team information
- Current team: Manchester United (consultant)

Senior career*
| Years | Team | Apps | (Gls) |
| 1974–1980 | Scunthorpe United | 190 | (1) |
| 198? | Boston United | | |

Managerial career
- 1998–2002: Derby County (Academy Director)
- 2002–2015: England U17
- 2015–2016: Derby County (coach)
- * Club domestic league appearances and goals

John Peacock (born 27 March 1956) is an English football coach and FIFA and UEFA Coach Educator. Former professional player. John has over 35 years of experience in international team management, coach education and professional youth development. Before moving into coach education and player development John spent his playing career with Scunthorpe Utd. John had 21 years with The Football Association interspersed with 4 years at Derby County FC as their Academy Director before moving into professional elite coaching.

John managed the England U17s for 13 years. He was the first England manager to win the UEFA under-17 European Championship in 2010 and then again in 2014. He also won a World Cup medal with England U20s when working as an advisor to the team in 2017, becoming the most successful England manager at any level. He has managed 228 international matches. In 2015, he was inducted into the Football Association Hall of Fame for outstanding contributions to coaching

John was the FA Head of Coaching from 2007 to 2015.

John was first team Coach at Derby County FC for 9 months before setting up his own football consultancy in 2016. John's clients have included FIFA, UEFA, the Chinese Football Association, Manchester United, The Turkish FA, Qatar FA, Saudi FA and the Canadian Soccer Association

John was a UEFA JIRA panel member for 8 years and now works for FIFA and UEFA as a technical expert and technical instructor respectively.

== Career ==
=== Playing career ===
Born in Leeds, Peacock made 190 appearances in the Football League for Scunthorpe United, as a full back.

=== Coaching career ===
In 2010, he won the UEFA European Under-17 Championship as coach of the England under-17 national team. He won the competition again in 2014. He won a medal with England U20 at the FIFA World Cup in 2017, working on the coaching staff as a consultant.
