= Daniel Peacock (cricketer) =

Personal information
- Full name: Daniel James Peacock
- Born: 26 April 1975 (age 51); Reading, Berkshire, England
- Batting: Right-handed
- Bowling: Right-arm off break

Domestic team information
- Years: Team
- 1998/99–1999/00: Mashonaland
- 2002: Hampshire Cricket Board

Career statistics
Competition	First-class	LA
Matches	14	10
Runs scored	312	43
Batting average	15.60	6.14
100s/50s	0/1	0/0
Top score	62	25
Balls bowled	2,391	378
Wickets	28	3
Bowling average	44.00	105.33
5 wickets in innings	0	0
10 wickets in match	0	0
Best bowling	4/8	1/19
Catches/stumpings	6/–	4/–
- Source: Cricinfo, 29 December 2009

Daniel James Peacock (born 26 April 1975) is an English-born former cricketer. Peacock was a right-handed batsman who bowled right-arm off break. He was born at Reading in Berkshire in 1975.

In January 1999 Peacock made his first-class debut for Mashonaland A against Matabeleland in the 1998/99 Logan Cup. Peacock represented Mashonaland A just once in the Logan Cup that season, but did represent a Zimbabwe Cricket Union President's XI against England A and for a Matabeleland Invitation XI against the Australian Cricket Academy.

In the same season Peacock made his List-A debut for Zimbabwe A against England A in February 1999. In March, Peacock represented a Matabeleland Invitation XI against the Australian Cricket Academy.

Peacock represented Zimbabwe A in the 1999/2000 ICC Emerging Nations Tournament, where Peacock played three matches against the national sides of Denmark, Kenya and Ireland. Later in 2000, Peacock played four List-A matches for Zimbabwe A on their tour of Sri Lanka. Peacock played five first-class matches on the tour, against Sri Lanka A in three matches and a Sri Lanka Board XI in two matches

In the 2000 Logan Cup, Peacock made his debut for Mashonaland against CFX Academy. Peacock represented Mashonaland in five first-class matches in 2000, including the final of the Logan Cup against Manicaland, which Mashonaland won by 257 runs.

Peacock's final first-class match came against the touring New Zealanders in September 2000. In his first-class career Peacock scored 312 runs at an average of 15.60, with a high score of 62. Peacock took only three wickets with his off breaks, averaging 105.33 per wicket.

Increasing politicization of cricket, including selectorial policy, along with the declining situation in Zimbabwe itself resulted in a mass exodus of players from Zimbabwe, with Peacock joining the exodus. Peacock played a single List-A game for the Hampshire Cricket Board in England, during the 1st Round of the 2003 Cheltenham & Gloucester Trophy which was played in 2002.

Pocock also represented the Hampshire Cricket Board in two Minor Counties Trophy Matches against the Channel Islands and Surrey Cricket Board in 2002.
