= Ernie Peacock =

English footballer

Personal information
- Full name: Ernest Gilbert Peacock
- Date of birth: 11 December 1924
- Place of birth: Bristol, England
- Date of death: 12 February 1973 (aged 48)
- Place of death: Bristol, England
- Position: Wing half

Youth career
- Barleyfields School & Syston

Senior career*
Years	Team	Apps	(Gls)
1945–1946	Notts County	0	(0)
1946–1959	Bristol City	343	(7)
1959–19??	Weymouth	??	(?)
	Taunton Town	??	(?)

Managerial career
- Taunton Town player manager
- * Club domestic league appearances and goals

Ernest Gilbert Peacock (born 11 December 1924 and died 12 February 1973 in Bristol) was an English footballer who played as a half back. He made over 340 Football League appearances in the years after the Second World War.

== Career ==
Ernie Peacock played locally for Barleyfield school and Syston in Bristol. Peacock played as a guest for Bath City during the Second World War before he signed for Notts County in the summer of 1945. Bob Hewison signed Peacock in October 1946 from Notts County for Bristol City.

== Honours ==
with Bristol City

- Football League Third Division South winner: 1954–55
