= Albert Williams =

Albert Williams may refer to:

- Albert Lynn Williams (1911–1982), American business executive; president of IBM in the 1960s
- Clifford Williams (politician) (Albert Clifford Williams, 1905–1987), Welsh Labour Party politician
- Albert Rhys Williams (1883–1962), American journalist, labor organizer, and publicist
- Albert Williams (baseball) (born 1954), Major League Baseball player from Nicaragua
- Albert Williams (trade unionist) (1927–2007), British trade union leader
- Albert Williams (gridiron football) (born 1964), American football linebacker
- Albert Smiley Williams (1849–1924), American politician, mayor of Nashville, Tennessee
- Albert Williams (British Army officer) (1832–1919), British Army officer and courtier
- Albert Williams (died 1927), African-American man lynched by a mob in Chiefland, Florida, see lynching of Albert Williams
- Albert Abel Williams, Vanuatuan politician
- Alby Williams (1916–?), Australian rules footballer

== See also ==
- Bertie Williams (1907–1968), Welsh footballer
- Bert Williams (disambiguation)
- Al Williams (disambiguation)
