= Herbert Williams =

Herbert Williams may refer to:

== Politics ==
- Sir Herbert Williams, 1st Baronet (1884–1954), British politician and Conservative Member of Parliament
- Sir Herbert Williams-Wynn, 7th Baronet (1860–1944), British politician and Member of Parliament
- Herbert Williams (politician) (1890–1943), member of the Queensland Legislative Assembly

== Sports ==
- Herbert Williams (cricketer, born 1860) (1860–1942), English cricketer
- Herbert Williams (cricketer, born 1900) (1900–1974), English cricketer
- Herbert Williams (sailor) (1908–1990), American Olympic sailor
- Herbie Williams (born 1940), Welsh footballer
- Herb Williams (born 1958), American basketball player
- Herb Williams (American football) (born 1958), American football defensive back
- Herb Williams (footballer) (1885–1924), Australian rules footballer

== Others ==
- Herbert Williams (bishop) (1860–1937), Anglican bishop in New Zealand
- Herb Williams (comedian) (1884–1936), American vaudeville comedian
- Herbert "Magic" Williams, fictional character appearing in one episode of the original Quantum Leap and as a main character in the 2022 revival of Quantum Leap

== See also ==
- Bert Williams (disambiguation)
