= 1789 in music =

== Events ==
- Wolfgang Amadeus Mozart travels to Berlin.
- Joseph Haydn meets Maria Anna von Genzinger.
- Adalbert Gyrowetz arrives in Paris.
- Luigi Cherubini becomes music director for the Théâtre Monsieur.
- Wilhelm Friedrich Ernst Bach becomes Kapellmeister at Berlin.
- Anna Storace appears in a London production of Giovanni Paisiello's Il Barbiere di Siviglia.
- Mozart writes to his fellow Freemason and benefactor, Puchberg, saying that next time they meet, he will tell him about Antonio Salieri’s plots "which, however, have completely failed".
- Ignaz Joseph Pleyel becomes Kapellmeister of Strasbourg Cathedral in succession to Franz Xaver Richter.

== Popular Music ==
- Charles Dibdin - The Flowing Can (from 'The Oddities')
- Charles Dibdin - The Greenwich Pensioner (from 'The Oddities')

== Classical music ==
- Ludwig van Beethoven – Two Preludes through all twelve major keys for piano, Op. 39
- William Hamilton Bird – The Oriental Miscellany
- William Crotch – The Captivity of Judah (oratorio)
- Carl Ditters von Dittersdorf – String Quintet in G major, Kr.190
- Jean-Louis Duport – 6 Cello Sonatas, Op. 4
- Jan Ladislav Dussek – Piano Sonatas No. 4–6, Op. 10
- John Gunn – 40 Favorite Scotch Airs for Violin, Flute, or Cello
- Joseph Haydn
  - Symphony No. 92 in G, "Oxford"
  - Fantasia in C major, Hob.XVII:4
- Leopold Anton Kozeluch – Concerto for Clarinet no 2 in E flat major
- Wolfgang Amadeus Mozart
  - Clarinet Quintet in A major
  - Un moto di gioia mi sento, K.579
- Vasilj Alekseevič Paškevič – Muzyka operyi Komitscheskoi Fewej
- Philip Phile – "The President's March"
- Ignaz Pleyel
  - String Quintet in F major, B.285
  - 3 Flute Quartets, B.381–383
  - 6 Violin Duos, B.513–518
- Karl Leopold Röllig – Kleine Tonstücke für die Glasharmonika
- Daniel Gottlob Türk – Klaviersonaten, größtenteils für Kenner
- Giovanni Battista Viotti – Violin Concerto No.16 in E minor

== Opera ==
- Domenico Cimarosa – I Due Baroni
- André Grétry – Raoul Barbe-Bleue
- Jean-Baptiste Lemoyne – Nephté
- Giovanni Paisiello – Nina
- Johann Friedrich Reichardt – Brenno; Claudine von Villa Bella
- Antonio Salieri – Il Pastor fido; La Cifra; both with libretto by Lorenzo Da Ponte
- Stephen Storace – The Haunted Tower
- Paul Wranitzky – Oberon, König der Elfen

== Methods and theory writings ==
- André Grétry – Mémoires, ou essai sur la musique
- John Gunn – The Theory and Practice of Fingering the Violoncello
- Manuel da Paixão Ribeiro – Nova arte de viola
- Luigi Antonio Sabbatini – Elementi teorici della musica
- Daniel Gottlob Türk
  - Klavierscule
  - Von den wichtigsten Pflichten eines Organisten

== Births ==
- January 30 – George Augustus Kollmann, composer
- February 1 – Hippolyte André Jean Baptiste Chélard, composer (d. 1861)
- February 8 – Ludwig Wilhelm Maurer, composer (d. 1878)
- February 15 – Friedrich Fesca, composer (d. 1826)
- May 24 – Cathinka Buchwieser, German opera singer and actress (d.1828)
- June 27 – Friedrich Silcher, composer (d. 1860)
- September 1 – Franz Anton Adam Stockhausen, composer
- October 18 – Giovanni Tadolini, composer
- October 24 – Ramon Carnicer y Batlle, composer (d. 1855)
- October 26 – Joseph Mayseder
- October 28 – Johann Schneider, composer
- November 13 – Martin de Ron, composer
- December 8 – John Fawcett, composer (d. 1867)
- December 14 – Maria Agata Szymanowska, composer (d. 1831)

== Deaths ==
- January 1 – Christleib Siegmund Binder, composer
- January 2 – Franz Joseph Leonti Meyer von Schavensee, composer
- January 20 – Johann Christoph Oley, composer
- February 2 – Armand-Louis Couperin, organist and composer (b. 1727)
- May 10 – Guillaume Gommaire Kennis, composer
- May 12 – Robert Bremner, music collector and publisher (born 1713)
- June 7 – Václav Jan Kopřiva (b. 1708)
- June 14 – Johann Wilhelm Hertel, composer (b. 1727)
- July 4 – Cláudio Manuel da Costa, poet and conductor (b. 1729)
- July 15 – Jacques Duphly, composer (b. 1715)
- September 11 – Luka Sorkočević, composer (b. 1734) (suicide)
- September 12 – Franz Xaver Richter, composer (b. 1709)
- October 24 – Joaquin de Oxinaga, composer
- date unknown
  - Minette, actress, singer and dancer (b. 1767) (killed in Haitian race riot)
  - Andreas Lidl, British composer (born c. 1740)
