= Alfred Williams (disambiguation) =

Alfred Williams (born 1968) is a retired American football player.

Alfred Williams may also refer to:

- Alfred C. Williams (1951–2015), state legislator in Louisiana
- Alfred Williams (poet) (1877–1930), British poet
- Alfred Walter Williams (1824–1905), Victorian landscape painter
- Alfred Williams (cricketer) (1844–?), English cricketer
- Al Williams (basketball) (1948–2007), American basketball player
- Alfred Williams (umpire) (died 1933), Australian cricket Test match umpire
- Alfred Martyn Williams (1897–1985), British Member of Parliament for North Cornwall, 1924–1929
- Alfred Williams, lynched on March 12, 1922, see Lynching of William Byrd

== See also ==
- Al Williams (disambiguation)
