= William Bird =

William Bird may refer to:

- Sir William Bird (lawyer) (1560/1–1624), lawyer and Member of Parliament for Oxford University
- William Hamilton Bird (fl. c. 1790), Irish musician
- William Wilberforce Bird (merchant) (1758–1836), Member of Parliament for Coventry
- William Wilberforce Bird (governor) (1784–1857), his son, Deputy Governor of Bengal and briefly Governor-General of India
- Sir William Bird (solicitor) (1855–1950), British solicitor and banker, briefly a Conservative politician
- William Watson Bird (1870–1954), New Zealand headmaster, school inspector, educational administrator and Maori linguist
- Bill Bird (1888–1963), American journalist
- Will R. Bird (1891–1984), Canadian writer
- William Bird (doctor) (born 1961), British medical doctor
- William Bird (cricketer) (1795–?), English cricketer
- William M. Bird (1889–1967), Canadian politician in the Legislative Assembly of New Brunswick
- William Bird (sculptor) (1624–1691), English sculptor

== See also ==
- William Byrd (disambiguation)
