= Robert J. Pope =

New Zealand poet, songwriter, cricketer (1865–1949)

Robert James Pope (24 March 1865 – 12 April 1949) was a New Zealand poet, songwriter, violinist, cricketer, teacher, and headmaster. He became well known in Wellington between 1910 and 1945 for his contributions to the New Zealand Free Lance and the popular 'Postscripts' column in the Evening Post newspaper as well as for his song 'New Zealand, My Homeland' used in New Zealand schools.

== Life ==
Pope was born in Caversham, Dunedin. He was one of a family of 12 and the son of Helen Grant Rattray and James Henry Pope (a future Government inspector of native schools and founder of the native school system). He attended Caversham District School and on 12 August 1881 left Dunedin aboard the Penguin arriving in Wellington where he entered Wellington College.

After school, Pope passed junior Civil Service Examinations in 1888, New Zealand University Examinations in 1889 and Teacher’s Examinations in the early 1890s. He lived in various parts of the lower and central North Island and began working as a teacher. He married Ernestina Victoria Pullar in Wellington on 29 December 1896. The couple had three children: Robert Earle Pope, Flora Pope and Eileen Fortune (née Pope). Eileen married Reo Fortune (1903–79), a well-known anthropologist at Cambridge University in England.

In all, Pope worked for the Wellington Education Board for 37 years as teacher and headmaster. He began his teaching at Te Aute College, Hawke’s Bay, and then became a master at the first school in Levin. He moved from Levin Public School to Featherston as an assistant teacher there and was next an assistant teacher at Newtown School in Wellington. He then became a headmaster at Kaiwaiwai School in the Wairarapa and after headmaster of Kaiwarra School in Wellington for 20 years. After a fire destroyed his original residence near Kaiwarra School in 1911, he lived in various suburbs of Wellington. Pope retired from Kaiwarra School in December 1925.

As a young man Pope was an able cricketer and an opening batsman for the Star Club’s Pearce Cup winning team of the early 1880s, where he played with well-known cricketers of the period such as the slow bowler Charlie Dryden. Some members of Pope’s team were also fathers of future All Black footballers.

He continued playing cricket for the Wellington College Old Boys and the Wellington Cricket Club where he won a 2nd XI batting trophy in 1896 (averaging 23.30 in 11 completed innings) and later for the Wairarapa Cricket Club when he was headmaster of Kaiwaiwai School.

Pope also had a reputation as a songwriter and violinist. In 1930, Pope donated lyrics and music to Wellington College for a school song. 'A Wellington College Song' penned by Pope was used at their breaking up ceremony in December that year.

Pope’s most notable song 'New Zealand, My Homeland' (composed in 1910) was written for his pupils at Kaiwarra School but after its publication in the New Zealand School Journal edited by his friend T. A. Fletcher, it began to be used in New Zealand schools from North Cape to the Bluff. As late as 1970, a letter to a newspaper suggested it as an alternative to Thomas Bracken's ‘God Defend New Zealand’.

Pope died in Wellington on 12 April 1949 at age 86. This suggests his birth date could be 1862 or 1863. An obituary appeared for him in the Evening Post, 12 April 1949 stating he died 'in his 87th year'.

== Literary output ==
Pope published two poetry collections in his lifetime, both late in his life: Some New Zealand Lyrics (1928) and A New Zealander's Fancies in Verse (1946). The latter collection contains a good deal of Pope's light verse written in a more modern style to the earlier Romantic and colonial lyrics of his first book. Notably his verse covers the two world wars (including a poem tribute to Wellington cricketer and headmaster J. P. Firth who lost many of his students during the Great War).

Pope's Some New Zealand Lyrics was reviewed in the Evening Post, 11 July 1928.

His writing period is between 1910 and 1945, from his 40s to his 80s, and Pope has further uncollected poems and prose pieces in the New Zealand Free Lance, the New Zealand School Journal and the Evening Post. He was a regular contributor to Percy Flage’s Postscripts column in the Evening Post (1931–45) and contributed poems to New Zealand Life.

In 1929 Pope also contributed an article on the correct pronunciation of Maori place names to the Evening Post.

Pope donated his scrapbook and music book to the Alexander Turnbull Library, Wellington, New Zealand. His daughter Eileen Fortune donated more papers and cuttings relating to her father to the Turnbull after his death.

== Renewal of interest ==
In 2010, Pope's cricket poem, 'King Willow', first published in the Evening Post, 4 October 1932, appeared in the anthology A Tingling Catch: A Century of New Zealand Cricket Poems 1864-2009.

That same year, New Zealand poet, critic and editor Mark Pirie (also editor of A Tingling Catch) wrote on Pope's poetry and life in Poetry Notes (Poetry Archive of New Zealand Aotearoa newsletter), Vol. 1, No. 1, Autumn 2010; and the article was reprinted in the Wellington College Old Boys' magazine The Lampstand, October 2010 and on Pirie’s blog Tingling Catch. Pirie stated in the article that he was 'currently preparing a fresh selection of Pope's poems for publication'.

Pope was also keenly interested in rugby and his rugby poems appeared in the Free Lance and the Evening Post. His rugby poems were republished on the Poetry Archive of New Zealand Aotearoa website during the IRB Rugby World Cup 2011, included on the world Poetry Atlas website, and in Poetry Notes (Poetry Archive of New Zealand Aotearoa newsletter), Vol. 2, No. 3, Spring 2011.

Pope's poem 'The All Blacks' also appeared in The Dominion Post's Thursday Poem page, 22 September 2011.

In February 2011, a YouTube video called 'My Home and My Heartland' featured an adaptation of Robert J. Pope's song 'New Zealand, My Homeland'.

In 2012, Mark Pirie published his selection of Robert J Pope's poems, King Willow, after extensive research in to Pope's work at the Alexander Turnbull Library in Wellington.

Comment was made by Dr Niel Wright on Louis Johnson and Robert J Pope in Poetry Notes [Poetry Archive of New Zealand Aotearoa Newsletter], Spring 2012, volume 3, issue 3.

Ron Palenski published an anthology of rugby poetry, Touchlines in 2013, including two of Pope's All Blacks poems found by Mark Pirie. Pirie also did publicity for Touchlines on the Tuesday Poem blog run by Mary McCallum with a poem by Pope.

Further comment on Pope's work has been made by Bill Sutton and Dr Niel Wright in Poetry Notes (Poetry Archive of New Zealand Aotearoa Newsletter), Summer 2015, volume 5, issue 4.

Researcher and author Matt Elliott (writer) included two poems by Pope under the name "Robert Pope" incorrectly in Rugby Folklore (2019).

== Poetry collections by Robert J. Pope ==
- Some New Zealand Lyrics (Whitcombe & Tombs, 1928)
- A New Zealander’s Fancies in Verse (Whitcombe & Tombs, 1946)
- King Willow: Selected Poems ed. Mark Pirie (HeadworX, Wellington, 2012)
