= William Byrd (disambiguation) =

William Byrd (circa 1540–1623) was an English composer.

William Byrd may also refer to:

- William Byrd I (1652–1704), Virginia colonist
- William Byrd II (1674–1744), colonial Virginia planter, author, and founder of Richmond
- William Byrd III (1728–1777), American racehorse owner
- Bill Byrd (William Byrd, 1907–1991), American professional baseball player
- William Byrd Traxler Jr. (born 1948), federal judge on the U.S. Court of Appeals for the Fourth Circuit
- William Byrd, African-American man who was lynched in Brentwood, Georgia on May 28, 1922, see lynching of William Byrd
- William A. Bird, often spelled Byrd, state legislator in Florida
- William M. Byrd (1819–1874), justice of the Supreme Court of Alabama
- Billy Byrd (1920–2001), American guitarist and session musician
- SS William Byrd, a Liberty ship

== See also ==
- Willie Byrd (born 1983), American football player
- William Byrd Hotel
- William Byrd High School
- William Byrd Community House
- William Bird (disambiguation)
