= Bert Williams (disambiguation) =

Bert Williams (1874–1922) was an American entertainer.

Bert Williams or Bertie Williams may also refer to:

- Bert Williams (Australian footballer) (1873–1955), Australian rules footballer
- Bert Williams (footballer, born 1905) (1905–1974), Welsh professional footballer
- Bert Williams (footballer, born 1920) (1920–2014), English professional footballer
- Bert Williams (footballer, born 1925) (William Hubert Williams1925–1973), English professional footballer, also known as Bill Williams, see List of Bury F.C. players (1–24 appearances)
- Bertie Williams (1907–1968), Welsh footballer
- Bert Williams (rugby league), Australian rugby league player
- Bertie Williams (Aboriginal activist), co-founder of the Aboriginal Tent Embassy in 1972
- Bertram Williams (sport shooter) (1876–1934), Canadian sport shooter, known as Bert

== See also ==
- Albert Williams (disambiguation)
- Bert Williams Leisure Centre
- Bertram Williams-Ellis
- Herbert Williams (disambiguation)
- Hubert Williams, pilot
- Robert Williams (disambiguation)
