= Alan Williams =

Alan Williams may refer to:

== Entertainment ==
- Alan Williams (actor) (born 1954), British actor
- Alan Williams (novelist) (1935–2020), British novelist
- Alan Vaughan Williams (born 1930), British playwright, theatre director and producer
- Alan Williams (singer) (born 1948), singer with The Rubettes

== Politics ==
- Sir Alan Meredith Williams (1909–1972), British diplomat
- Alan Lee Williams (born 1930), British member of parliament for Hornchurch
- Alan Williams (Swansea West MP) (1930–2014), British member of parliament for Swansea West
- Alan Williams (Carmarthen MP) (born 1945), British member of parliament for Carmarthen
- Alan Williams (Florida politician) (born 1975), American politician

== Sports ==
- Alan Williams (rugby union) (1893–1984), American who competed in the 1924 Summer Olympics
- Alan Williams (Australian footballer) (1917–1988), Australian rules footballer
- Alan Williams (footballer, born 1938) (1938–2017), English footballer
- Alan Williams (canoeist) (born 1954), British sprint canoer
- Alan Williams (basketball) (born 1993), American basketball player
- Alan Williams (American football) (born 1969), American football coach
- Alan Williams (cyclist) (born 1948), English track cyclist

== Other ==
- Alan Williams (economist) (1927–2005), British health economist
- Alan Williams (immunologist) (1945–1992), immunologist
- Alan Williams (bishop) (born 1951), Roman Catholic bishop of Brentwood, England

== See also ==
- Allan Williams (1930–2016), businessman, booking agent to the Beatles
- Allan Williams (politician) (1922–2011), attorney-general of British Columbia, 1979–1983
- Al Williams (disambiguation)
