= Al Williams =

Al Williams may refer to:

- Al Williams (1930s pitcher) (1914–1969), Major League Baseball pitcher
- Al Williams (1940s pitcher), Negro league baseball pitcher
- Al Williams (basketball) (1948–2007), American basketball player
- Al Williams (wrestler), American professional wrestler
- Al Williams (pianist) (1919–1998), American jazz pianist
- Al Williams (politician) (born 1947), American politician in Georgia
- Al Williams (author), blogger for Dr. Dobb's Journal and Hackaday
- Al Williams (aviator), 1930s display pilot of Grumman F3F
- Al Williams (gridiron football) (born 1961), football player
- Albert Lynn Williams (1911–1982), American business executive

== See also ==
- Alan Williams (disambiguation)
- Albert Williams (disambiguation)
- Alexander Williams (disambiguation)
- Alfred Williams (disambiguation)
