= Malcolm Sircom =

English writer, musician, musical director and composer (1934-2008)

Malcolm Alan Sircom (3 August 1934 – 11 June 2008) was an English writer, musician, musical director and composer.

== Biography ==
Born in 1934, Sircom was raised next to Highbury, the old home of Arsenal Football Club, of which he was an eager supporter. He was also a keen cricket player.

He attended Cambridge University. After graduation, he began working in theatre and particularly old time music hall where he met his first wife, actress Patsy Rowlands. The couple were divorced in 1971. In 1973, he married his second wife, actress Judith Boyd.

In 1985, he authored the book and was responsible for creating both the music and lyrics for 'The Mr. Men Musical'. He began writing school musicals in the 1990s and it is for this that he is perhaps best known. His shows are published by "Musicline School Musicals" and "School Nativity Plays".

=== Death ===
Sircom died in 2008 in Derby, following a long illness.

== Works ==
- Ernest, 1959
- Pineapple, 1959
- Pardon my Language, 1963, staged by Alan Vaughan Williams at the Theatre Royal Lincoln.
- The Mr. Men Musical, 1985
- Ebenezer, 1992
- Olivia (Junior)
- Olivia (Senior)
- Dream On!
- The Rocky Monster Show
- The Dracula Rock Show
- The Good, The Bad And The Donkey
- The Little Shepherd
- The Pied Piper
- Pictures Of A Christmas World
- The Pinafore Pirates
- Gel
