= Native schools =

Schools established to acculturate Māori into white New Zealander society

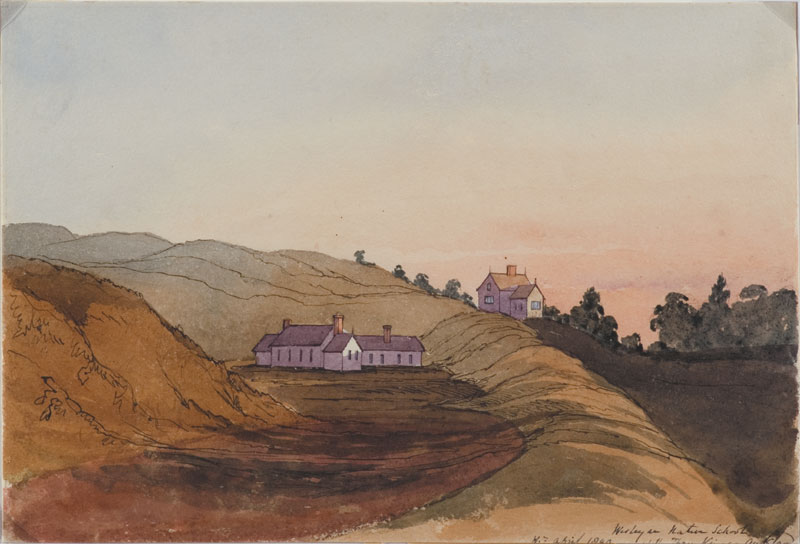
Painting of the Wesleyan Native School, Three Kings, Auckland (April 1849)

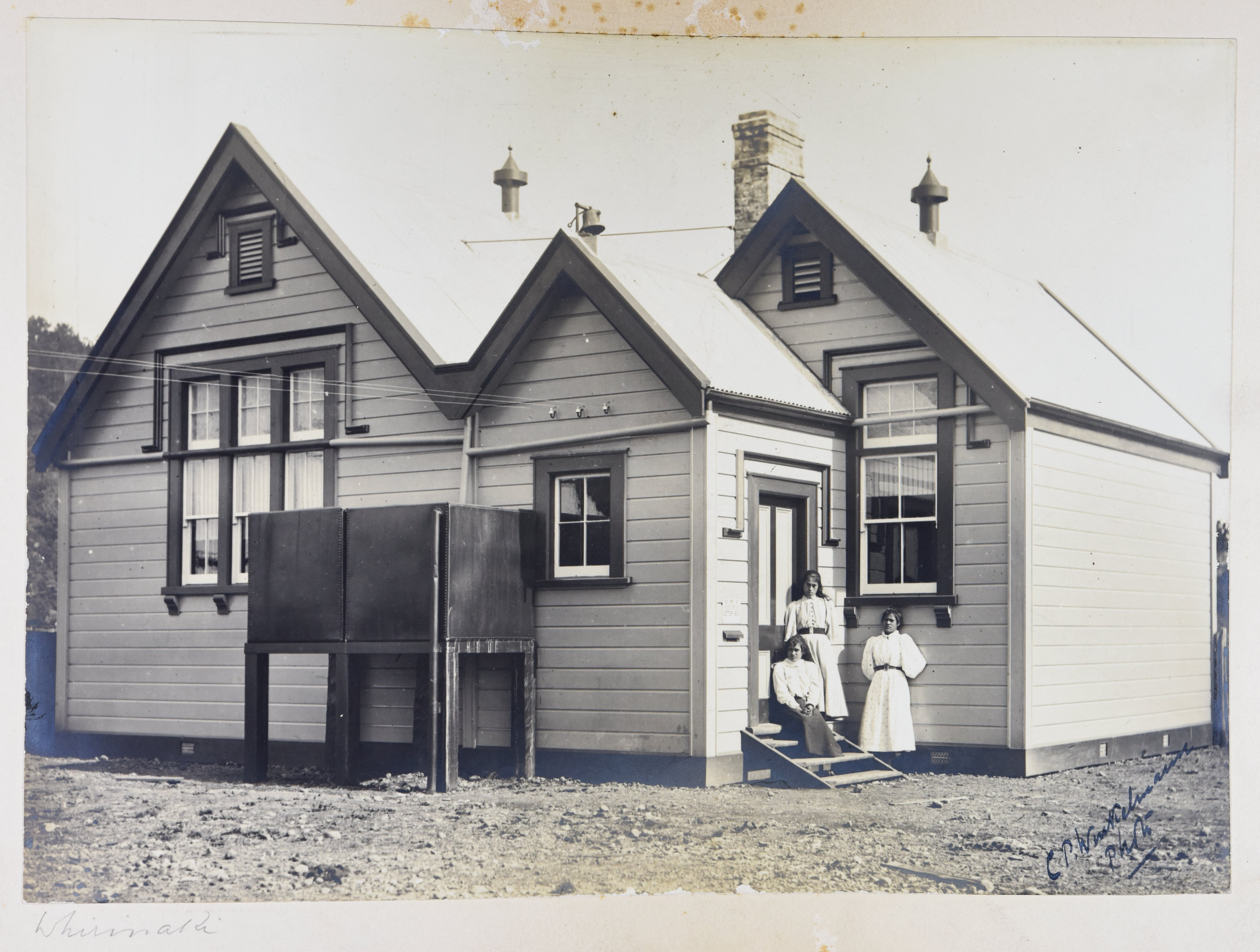
Native school at Whirinaki, in Northland

Native schools or Māori schools in New Zealand were established to provide education for Māori children. The first schools for Māori were established by the Anglican Church Missionary Society (CMS) in the Bay of Islands starting in 1816. Catholic priests and brothers established schools for Māori throughout the country, including Hato Paora College (Feilding) and Hato Petera College (Auckland). St Joseph's Māori Girls' College (Taradale) was founded by the Sisters of Our Lady of the Missions.

The Native Schools Act 1867 established a national system of village primary schools under the control of the Native Department. Instruction was to be conducted in English where practical. Under the Act, it was the responsibility of Māori communities to request a school for their children, form a school committee, supply land for the school and, until 1871, pay for half of the building costs and a quarter of the teacher's salary. Many communities were keen for their children to learn English as a second language and by 1879 there were 57 native schools. In 1880 the first inspector of native schools was appointed and a Native Schools Code was issued that prescribed a curriculum, established qualifications for teachers, and standardised operation for the Māori schools.

== Church and missionary schools ==
The CMS founded its first mission at Rangihoua in the Bay of Islands in 1814 and over the next decade established schools in the Bay of Islands, the first being run by Thomas Kendall from 1816 to 1818. Education of Māori children and adults advanced with the arrival of Henry Williams and his wife Marianne in 1823. In 1826 Henry's brother William Williams and his wife Jane joined the CMS mission and settled at Paihia in the Bay of Islands, where schools were established. Richard Taylor was appointed as head of the CMS school at Te Waimate mission in 1839 and remained there until 1842.

Schools for Māori children and adults were established in locations where the CMS established mission stations. For example, William Williams and his family arrived at Tūranga, Poverty Bay, on 20 January 1840. The schools run by William and Jane were well attended; the school opened with five classes for men, two classes for women and classes for boys. Classes covered practical knowledge as well as teaching of the scriptures.

Early missionary schools were often conducted in the Māori language, which was the predominant language throughout the early part of the 19th century. Māori who had attended mission schools set up their own schools back in their villages. By the 1860s, three-quarters of the Māori population could read in Māori and two-thirds could write in Māori.

The Education Ordinance of 1847 provided some funding for mission schools and required them to conduct classes in English in order to receive the subsidies. Te Aute College was established by Samuel Williams of the CMS in 1854. The Native Schools Act 1858 continued the subsidies for church boarding schools for Māori. The mission schools struggled to conduct all teaching in English, and many continued to teach in Māori. The Roman Catholic St Joseph's Māori Girls' College was established by the Sisters of Our Lady of the Missions in 1867.

The New Zealand Wars caused many of the mission schools to close. However, Te Aute College and St Joseph's Māori Girls' College, both in Hawke's Bay, were not impacted by the wars. The Anglican Hukarere Girls' College was established in Napier in 1875. Catholic priests and brothers established other schools for Māori, including Hato Petera College (Auckland) in 1928 and Hato Paora College (Feilding) in 1947.

== Native schools ==
The Native Schools Act of 1867 was a major shift in policy. Rather than helping churches to rebuild mission schools after the wars, the government offered secular, state-controlled, primary schools to Māori communities who petitioned for them. In return for providing a suitable site, the government provided a school, teacher, books, and materials. Native school teachers frequently also provided medicines and medical advice to their pupils and their families, and acted as liaison between rural communities and the government. The schools were transferred from the Native Department to the Department of Education in 1879.

James Pope was appointed the organising inspector of native schools in January 1880 and later that year he issued a Native Schools Code that prescribed a curriculum, established qualifications for teachers, and standardised operation for the native schools. The primary mission was to assimilate Māori into European culture. Māori could attend Board of Education schools and non-Māori could attend native schools, although the primary purpose of the native schools was providing European education for Māori.

=== English language teaching ===
Section 21 of the Native Schools Act 1867 states:

No school shall receive any grant unless it is shown to the satisfaction of the Colonial Secretary by the report of the inspector or otherwise as the Colonial Secretary shall think fit that the English language and the ordinary subjects of primary English education are taught by a competent teacher and that the instruction is carried on in the English language as far as practicable Provided always that it shall be lawful for the Colonial Secretary to contribute to the maintenance or salaries of such Native teachers as shall conduct Native Schools in remote districts when it may be found impossible to provide English teachers.

The Native Schools Code published in 1880 stated that "the Native children must be taught to read and write the English language, and to speak it" and also

It is not necessary that teachers should, at the time of their appointment, be acquainted with the Maori tongue; but they may find it desirable to learn enough Māori to enable them to communicate with the adult Natives. In all cases English is to be used by the teacher when he is instructing the senior classes. In the junior classes the Maori language may be used for the purpose of making the children acquainted with the meanings of English words and sentences. The aim of the teacher, however, should be to dispense with the use of Maori in school as soon as possible.

In 1906 the Inspector of Native Schools, William Bird, reported to the Inspector-General of Schools:

I should like to impress upon both teachers and committees the necessity for encouraging the children to talk English on the playground, and to see that this is done as much as possible. There are many schools in which this habit is regularly practised, and it is very encouraging to hear the young Maori children calling to one another in English as they chase each other about the playground. I may inform teachers that it has been alleged that an important distinction exists in this very respect between the Maori children attending a Board school and those attending one of our own Native schools—namely, that the former speak English in the playground, while the latter speak Maori. I hope that teachers will do their best to give this statement a practical denial, and to take every care to impress upon the children the necessity of practising outside school the lessons they learn within it.

Although children were to be encouraged to speak English, there was never an official policy banning children from speaking Māori. However, some native school committees made rules to that effect, a practice that persisted well into the 20th century. This contributed to the decline in the general use of Māori.

=== Other curriculum issues ===
In the late 1800s, George Hogben, Director of Education, implemented the policy of removing academic subjects, such as Latin, Euclidean geometry and algebra, which were subjects that were part of the matriculation programme for entry to a university, and focused the curriculum of native schools on agricultural and technical instruction and domestic skills. It was pointed out that there was nothing to stop a Māori from learning classics, maths and algebra (for example) at a regular public school. Regarding Te Aute College, there was a recommendation in 1906 that "having regard to the circumstances of the Maoris as owners of considerable areas of suitable agricultural and pastoral land, it is necessary to give prominence in the curriculum to manual and technical instruction in agriculture. This view was supported by Māori politicians. William Bird, Inspector of Native Schools, expressed the opinion that the objective of Māori education should be to prepare pupils for life among Māori where they could take the skills they had learned to improve the lives of people in their home villages.

In 1912, the government was considering handing control of native schools from the Education Department to local Education Boards. Members of Parliament Āpirana Ngata and Te Rangihīroa spoke against suddenly doing so, saying that "far better results were attained by Maori children at Native schools than at public schools. The reason was that at public schools Maori children, to whom English was a foreign language, were placed side by side with white children, who had obtained a colloquical [sic] knowledge of English in their own homes. In the Native schools special attention was paid to the teaching of English". Ngata said that Māori were suspicious that their children did not receive the same attention at board schools as at native schools.

In 1929 history was added to the native school curriculum, with teachers being advised to emphasise Māori and New Zealand history, and in 1930 a new primary school syllabus was introduced to board schools and (with modifications) to native schools. The new syllabus was criticised by an ex-Inspector of Native Schools in 1936. He stated that:

The Maori language has been degraded and corrupted, and the young Maori has learned to aspire after pakeha ideas, sports and fashions and to despise Maori ways. The idea that the Maori would soon be absorbed into the pakeha population was one stultifying cause, and another was the lust for examination results inherent in a system run by ex-teachers and easily communicated to parents and the public. The most urgent reform in the education of the Maori is to restore and preserve the Maori language. Thousands of Maori children cannot speak Maori. This is a great loss.

At a Māori conference in 1936 the subject of teaching Māori language was discussed and attendees pointed out that children in native schools were punished for speaking Māori. Academics at Auckland University College supported the view from the conference that Māori language and culture should be fostered at native schools, but by 1939 the Inspector of Native Schools was able to state that pupils seemed to be thinking in English more often and translating more easily from Māori to English.

=== Decline of Māori schools ===
In 1947 George Brown, the only Māori on the Hawkes Bay Education Board, suggested that board schools and native schools should be unified completely under one system. He pointed out that most Māori children attended board schools and felt there was no longer any need for separate schools, unless there was a demand for a completely separate system.

Native schools became known as "Māori schools" following the Maori Purposes Act 1947, under which all government usage switched from 'Native' to 'Maori'. The number of Māori schools began to decline in the 1950s. In 1958 almost 70 per cent of Māori children attended a board school, but there were still 157 Māori schools (down from 166 in 1955). The government's long-term policy was to transfer Māori schools to the control of education boards, in consultation with local Māori communities. The New Zealand Official Yearbook stated:

The language of instruction in the Maori schools is English, but the schools are not completely English in outlook, for Maori arts and crafts, song, legend, and history are taught. Methods of teaching are practical, and objectives closely related to the special needs of the Maori people. In many of the Maori schools, such equipment as woodwork rooms, cookery rooms, model cottages, baths, hot and cold showers, and laundries is supplied. Health education is featured in every Maori school.

The number of Māori schools continued to decline, and by 1968 there were only 108 Māori primary schools with a total of 8200 pupils, including 749 non-Māori children. 85 percent of Māori children attended state primary schools controlled by education boards, 11.1 percent were at Māori schools controlled directly by the Education Department, and 3.8 percent attended private schools (including Māori private schools). The principal of Kaeo District High School noted that children from small Māori schools were hampered at secondary school because they did not have a good grasp of English. He stated that: “We have frequently discovered that children of even seven or eight years have no English word for quite common everyday things. Children such as these speak neither English nor Maori at home but a sort of pidgin mixture of both languages".

In 1968 the Prime Minister announced that all state Māori schools would be put under the management of education boards, and the last 108 native schools were transferred to the control of boards by the beginning of 1969. The aim was to deliver a better service to Māori pupils.

== See also ==
- American Indian boarding schools
- Canadian Indian residential school system
- History of education in New Zealand
- Kura kaupapa Māori (Māori-language schools established from the 1980s onwards)
