= Chiefland, Florida =

- City
- City of Chiefland
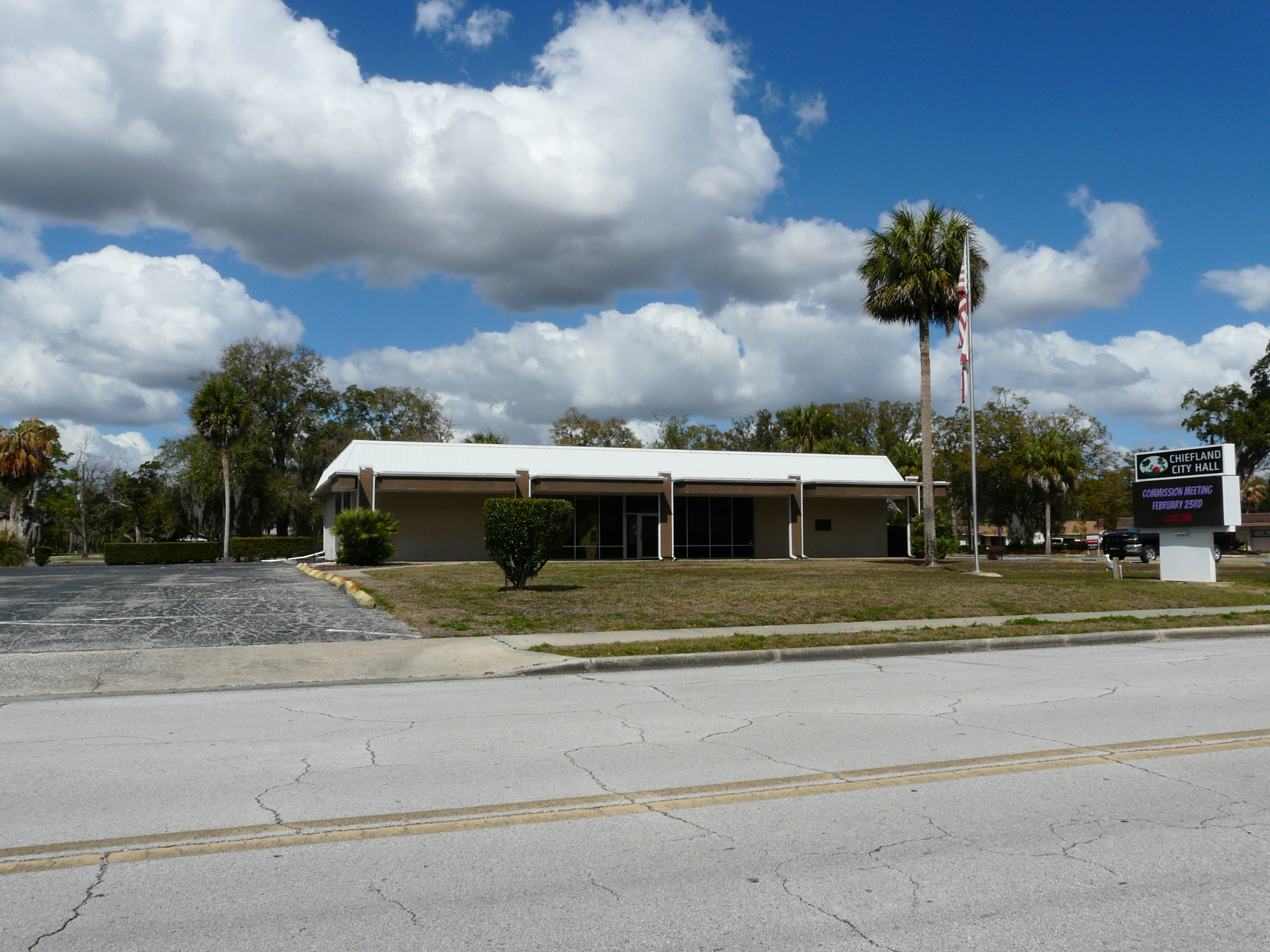
- Chiefland City Hall

- Seal
- Motto: "The Gem of the Suwanee Valley"
- Location in Levy County and the state of Florida
- Coordinates: 29°30′26″N 82°52′34″W
- Country: United States
- State: Florida
- County: Levy
- Platted (Charlie Emathla’s Town): 1843
- Settled (Charlie Emathla’s Town): 1845
- Settled (Hardeetown): 1860
- Incorporated (City of Chiefland): 1913

Government
  - Type: Commission–Manager
  - Mayor: Lewrissa Johns
  - Vice Mayor: Norman Weaver
  - Commissioners: Chris Jones, Kim Bennett, and LaWanda Jones
  - City Manager and City Clerk: Laura Cain
  - City Attorney: Norm D. Fugate

Area
  - Total: 6.76 sq mi (17.50 km^{2})
  - Land: 6.76 sq mi (17.50 km^{2})
  - Water: 0 sq mi (0.00 km^{2})
- Elevation: 33 ft (10 m)

Population (2020)
  - Total: 2,316
  - Density: 342.8/sq mi (132.37/km^{2})
- Time zone: UTC-5 (Eastern (EST))
  - Summer (DST): UTC-4 (EDT)
- ZIP codes: 32626, 32644
- Area code: 352
- FIPS code: 12-11925
- GNIS feature ID: 2404047
- Website: cityofchiefland.com

Chiefland is a city in Levy County, Florida, United States. The population was 2,316 at the 2020 census, up from 2,245 at the 2010 census. It is part of the Gainesville, Florida Metropolitan Statistical Area.

== History ==
A village of the Timucua people was once located south of the present city and at Manatee Springs. The area's economy is traditionally based on agriculture, primarily farming (peanuts, watermelons, hay); ranching (cattle, hogs); dairy (milk); timber (pulpwood, lumber, turpentine) and aquaculture (fishing, oystering, crabbing).

After Spanish Florida became the Florida Territory of the United States, it was platted in 1843, and when Florida officially became a U.S. state in 1845, the community turned into a permanent settlement by non-indigenous people and called "Charlie Emathla’s Town". In 1860, it was renamed "Hardeetown", after Isaac P. Hardee, who was a slaver that owned a large plantation that extended for miles and the community was eventually built on the land. The City of Chiefland was officially incorporated as a municipality in 1913. Its named for the Muscogee Creek (and early Seminole) chieftains who lived in chiefdoms within the current city before and during the Spanish Florida and British Florida eras until it became the Florida Territory, when shortly after, the Indian Removal Act and Trail of Tears happened under then U.S.Army general, Andrew Jackson.

In July 1927, a Black man named Albert Williams was shot and then lynched by a mob. He had allegedly assaulted a white turpentine operator over a debt he owed the white man, and "was shot to death by a mob".

== Geography ==
According to the United States Census Bureau, the city has a total area of 16.1 square miles (42 km^{2}), all land.

Chiefland is at the junction of U.S. Highways Alternate 27, 19, and 98. US 129 was converted into a separate junction in the early 21st century. It is 30 miles (48 km) southwest of Gainesville.

=== Climate ===
The climate in this area is characterized by hot, humid summers and generally mild winters. According to the Köppen climate classification, the City of Chiefland has a humid subtropical climate zone (Cfa).

Climate data for Chiefland, Florida (Usher Tower), 1991–2020 normals, extremes 1956–present
Month	Jan	Feb	Mar	Apr	May	Jun	Jul	Aug	Sep	Oct	Nov	Dec	Year
Record high °F (°C)	87 (31)	88 (31)	92 (33)	100 (38)	102 (39)	105 (41)	103 (39)	100 (38)	99 (37)	96 (36)	92 (33)	86 (30)	105 (41)
Mean maximum °F (°C)	78.8 (26.0)	81.3 (27.4)	84.3 (29.1)	88.6 (31.4)	93.3 (34.1)	95.5 (35.3)	96.0 (35.6)	94.9 (34.9)	92.6 (33.7)	89.2 (31.8)	84.1 (28.9)	79.7 (26.5)	97.3 (36.3)
Mean daily maximum °F (°C)	66.4 (19.1)	69.7 (20.9)	74.9 (23.8)	80.3 (26.8)	86.1 (30.1)	88.7 (31.5)	89.4 (31.9)	89.0 (31.7)	86.9 (30.5)	81.4 (27.4)	73.6 (23.1)	68.2 (20.1)	79.6 (26.4)
Daily mean °F (°C)	55.3 (12.9)	58.5 (14.7)	63.0 (17.2)	68.4 (20.2)	74.5 (23.6)	79.3 (26.3)	80.7 (27.1)	80.8 (27.1)	78.5 (25.8)	71.5 (21.9)	62.7 (17.1)	57.4 (14.1)	69.2 (20.7)
Mean daily minimum °F (°C)	44.1 (6.7)	47.2 (8.4)	51.0 (10.6)	56.6 (13.7)	62.9 (17.2)	69.9 (21.1)	72.0 (22.2)	72.5 (22.5)	70.2 (21.2)	61.7 (16.5)	51.8 (11.0)	46.7 (8.2)	58.9 (14.9)
Mean minimum °F (°C)	24.9 (−3.9)	27.7 (−2.4)	32.7 (0.4)	40.5 (4.7)	50.1 (10.1)	63.0 (17.2)	67.6 (19.8)	67.5 (19.7)	60.9 (16.1)	43.7 (6.5)	33.1 (0.6)	28.7 (−1.8)	23.2 (−4.9)
Record low °F (°C)	9 (−13)	15 (−9)	22 (−6)	28 (−2)	42 (6)	44 (7)	59 (15)	57 (14)	44 (7)	28 (−2)	17 (−8)	12 (−11)	9 (−13)
Average precipitation inches (mm)	3.61 (92)	3.25 (83)	3.81 (97)	2.97 (75)	2.78 (71)	8.03 (204)	8.32 (211)	9.87 (251)	5.82 (148)	3.17 (81)	2.22 (56)	3.25 (83)	57.10 (1,450)
Average precipitation days (≥ 0.01 in)	7.2	7.0	6.9	5.1	6.2	13.3	15.8	16.1	10.4	6.3	5.1	6.0	105.4
Source: NOAA

== Demographics ==
Historical population
Census	Pop.	Note	%±
1930	421		—
1940	572		35.9%
1950	843		47.4%
1960	1,459		73.1%
1970	1,965		34.7%
1980	1,986		1.1%
1990	1,917		−3.5%
2000	1,993		4.0%
2010	2,245		12.6%
2020	2,316		3.2%
U.S. Decennial Census

=== Racial and ethnic composition ===
Chiefland racial composition (Hispanics excluded from racial categories) (NH = Non-Hispanic)
Race	Pop 2010	Pop 2020	% 2010	% 2020
White (NH)	1,300	1,331	57.91%	57.47%
Black or African American (NH)	681	588	30.33%	25.39%
Native American or Alaska Native (NH)	6	12	0.27%	0.52%
Asian (NH)	38	59	1.69%	2.55%
Pacific Islander or Native Hawaiian (NH)	0	0	0.00%	0.00%
Some other race (NH)	8	5	0.36%	0.22%
Two or more races/Multiracial (NH)	64	133	2.85%	5.74%
Hispanic or Latino (any race)	148	188	6.59%	8.12%
Total	2,245	2,316		

=== 2020 census ===
As of the 2020 census, there were 2,316 people in the city.

The median age was 35.0 years. 27.0% of residents were under the age of 18, and 17.2% were 65 years of age or older. For every 100 females there were 84.0 males, and for every 100 females age 18 and over there were 77.7 males age 18 and over.

There were 943 households, of which 34.4% had children under the age of 18 living in them. Of all households, 29.9% were married-couple households, 19.7% were households with a male householder and no spouse or partner present, and 41.5% were households with a female householder and no spouse or partner present. About 31.2% of all households were made up of individuals and 16.7% had someone living alone who was 65 years of age or older.

There were 1,064 housing units, of which 11.4% were vacant. The homeowner vacancy rate was 3.7% and the rental vacancy rate was 4.7%.

0.0% of residents lived in urban areas, while 100.0% lived in rural areas.

According to the 2020 American Community Survey 5-year estimates, there were 564 families residing in the city.

=== 2010 census ===
As of the 2010 United States census, there were 2,245 people, 948 households, and 598 families residing in the city.

=== 2000 census ===
As of the census of 2000, there were 1,993 people, 796 households, and 511 families residing in the city. The population density was 509.5 inhabitants per square mile (196.7/km^{2}). There were 931 housing units at an average density of 238.0 per square mile (91.9/km^{2}). The racial makeup of the city was 60.36% White, 34.27% African American, 0.65% Native American, 1.66% Asian, 0.10% Pacific Islander, 0.65% from other races, and 2.31% from two or more races. Hispanic or Latino of any race were 2.76% of the population.

In 2000, there were 796 households out of which 35.7% had children under the age of 18 living with them, 36.1% were married couples living together, 23.4% had a female householder with no husband present, and 35.8% were non-families. 32.2% of all households were made up of individuals and 15.5% had someone living alone who was 65 years of age or older. The average household size was 2.45 and the average family size was 3.05.

In 2000, in the city, the population was spread out, with 31.3% under the age of 18, 9.0% from 18 to 24, 22.8% from 25 to 44, 20.0% from 45 to 64, and 16.9% who were 65 years of age or older. The median age was 34 years. For every 100 females, there were 79.7 males. For every 100 females age 18 and over, there were 71.3 males.

In 2000, the median income for a household in the city was $17,331, and the median income for a family was $23,750. Males had a median income of $25,000 versus $19,792 for females. The per capita income for the city was $10,676. About 33.3% of families and 36.8% of the population were below the poverty line, including 46.0% of those under the age of 18 and 24.4% of those aged 65 or over.

== Economy ==
Chiefland is located in the northwest corner of the county, where Levy, Dixie and Gilchrist counties adjoin (known as the "Tri-County area"). Agriculture is still a major factor in the local economy, but there has been a big shift to a service economy. Georgia-Pacific was a large employer, operating a mill in Chiefland from 1955 to 1978. There are three incarceration facilities in the area: Cross City Correctional Institution & Work Camp; Lancaster Correctional Institution & Work Camp; and Levy Forestry Camp. They provide a total of over 800 jobs.

As growth in north Florida increased during the last quarter of the twentieth century, Chiefland became a local center for shopping. A 202,000 sq ft (18,800 m^{2}) Walmart Supercenter was opened in 1995, and increased traffic along US 19/98 support a variety of national fast food franchises and places to stay overnight.

== Attractions ==
Manatee Springs State Park is located 6 miles (10 km) west of town; the crystal-clear water is a "first-magnitude" spring that flows directly into the Suwannee River. The park offers a full slate of activities, including camping. Manatees can be seen in the spring year-round, but especially in late fall and winter, where the constant 72 °F (22 °C) temperature of the spring is much warmer than river water.

The Annual Watermelon Festival is the largest event of the year and dates back to 1954. It is held each year on the first Saturday of June and is maintained by the Chiefland Women's Club.

The Levy County Quilt Museum, founded by the Log Cabin Quilters club, is the only registered quilting museum in the state of Florida. Twice a year quilters organize a Quilt Show for local quilters to exhibit their work at the museum. The museum is open throughout the year and the collection contains unique items like a quilt made from the ties of two former Presidents, Jimmy Carter and Gerald Ford. Open on Tuesday—Saturday, the museum is free to enter and is located just off of Highway Alt 27 on CR 134.

Chief Theatre, home to the Suwannee Valley Players, is located off of Main Street and E, Park Avenue in downtown Chiefland. The theatre was built in 1948 as a movie theater till 1984. In 1998, the building was purchased and reopened as a Playhouse due to a historic preservation grant. The Suwannee Valley Players, the oldest community theater troupe in Levy and its adjacent counties, has performed at Chief Theatre for over 37 years. The local theater group presents a new play around every 3 months, these plays include well known titles such as The Importance of Being Earnest and Into the Woods to original plays written by local writers.

== Education ==
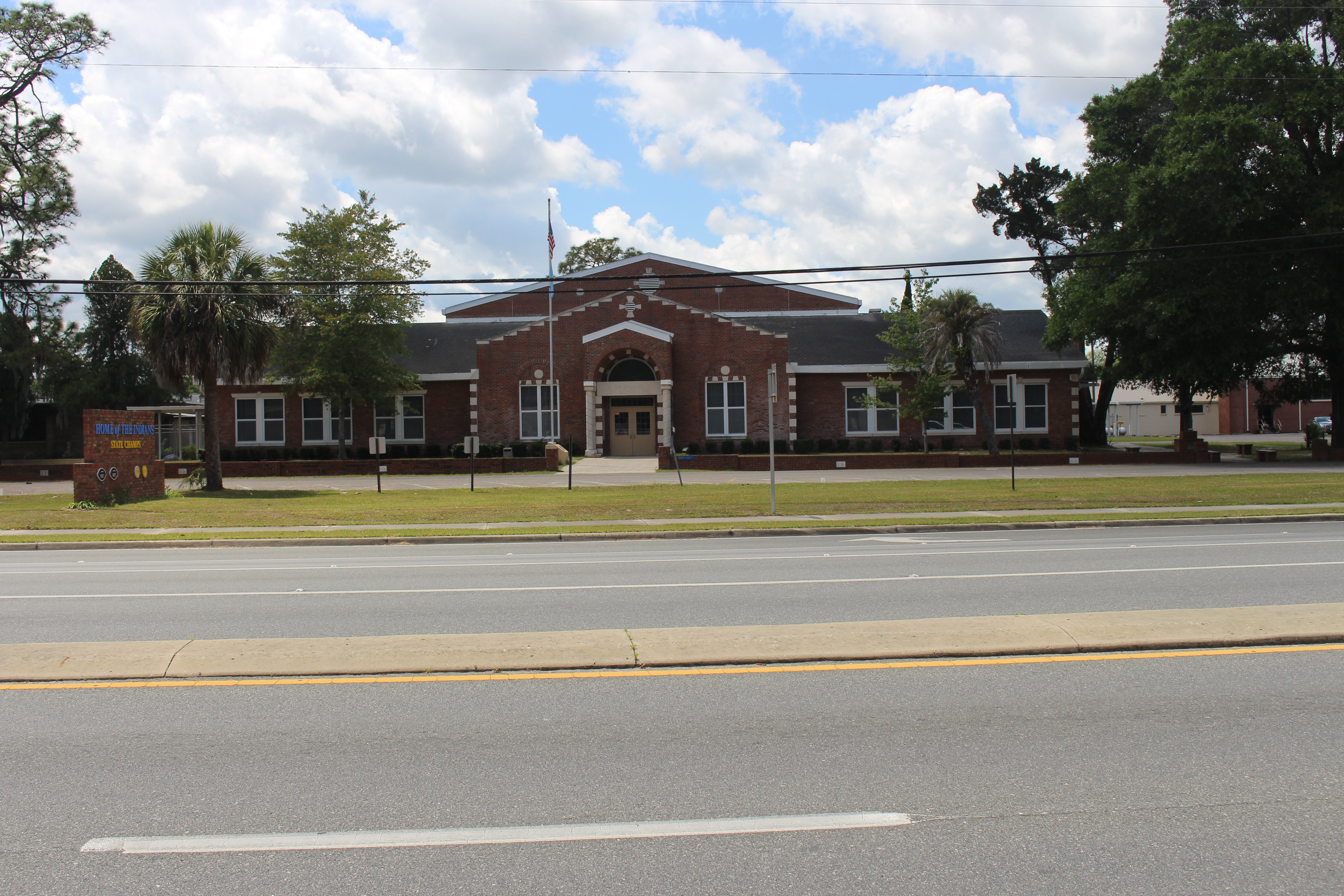
Chiefland High School

Chiefland has two public schools: Chiefland Middle High School, and Chiefland Elementary. The School Board of Levy County controls their operation and also supervises two charter schools: Nature Coast Middle School and Whispering Winds. Other schools under the board's jurisdiction are in the town of Bronson, the city of Williston, the city of Cedar Key, and Yankeetown.

The College of Central Florida has built a $12 million campus on 35 acres (14 ha) of donated land by the Mann family. The new location has been designated the Jack Wilkinson Levy Campus in honor of the former high school math teacher's donation of $2.5 million to the campus.

=== Library ===
Levy County provides Chiefland with a local public library. The Luther Callaway Public Library is a depository library that receives publications from the State of Florida for public use. The library was dedicated in 1985 to Luther Callaway who was postmaster for almost 30 years and a school teacher. In November 2019, two vacant parcels of land were donated by Luther Callaway's family in hopes of expanding the library facilities. The library is also supported by the "Friends of the Luther Callaway Public Library (FLCPL) Board of Directors group. FLCPL supports the library through fundraising efforts in order to support library programs and resources.

== Healthcare ==
The State of Florida approved a 28-bed hospital in Chiefland to serve the needs of western Levy County, Dixie County, and Gilchrist County. The hospital was developed by Ameris Health Systems LLC. and was set to open on September 1, 2014. However, after a set of delays and financial problems, it was announced in 2013 that the project was no longer in development.

== See also ==
- Fanning Springs, Florida
