= Lewis Johnson =

Lewis Johnson may refer to:

- Lewis Johnson (commentator) (born 1962), American sports commentator and sports reporter
- Lewis Johnson (footballer) (born 2004), English footballer
- Lewis L. Johnson (1880–1943), American politician

== See also ==
- S. Lewis Johnson (1915–2004), American pastor and theologian
- Lew Johnson (c. 1840–1910), American minstrel show manager
- Llew Johnson, New Zealand cricketer
- Lewis Johnston (born 1991), Australian rules footballer
- Lewis Johnston (umpire) (1917–1993), New Zealand cricket umpire
- Louis Johnson (disambiguation)
