= Albert Williams (British Army officer) =

British Army officer and courtier

Major-General Sir Albert Williams KCVO
- Born: 7 February 1832
- Died: 29 October 1919 (aged 87)
- Military career
- Allegiance: United Kingdom
- Branch: British Army
- Service years: 1849–1894
- Rank: Major-General
- Conflicts: Crimean War; Indian Mutiny
- Awards: Knight Commander of the Royal Victorian Order; Mentioned in Despatches
- Other work: Colonel Commandant Royal Horse Artillery

Major-General Sir Albert Henry Wilmot Williams, KCVO (7 February 1832 – 29 October 1919) was a British Army officer and courtier.

== Early life and family ==
Albert Henry Wilmot Williams was born on 7 February 1832, the second son of Captain James Wilmot Williams (died 1845), of Herringston in Dorset, and his wife, Elizabeth Anne Magenis, daughter of Richard Magenis, of County Down, a member of Parliament, by his wife Lady Elizabeth Cole, daughter of William Cole, 1st Earl of Enniskillen. The family were long-established members of the English landed gentry and the elder Williams had inherited his father's estate in 1757. The younger Williams had four siblings: Edward Wilmot Williams, JP, DL (b. 1826), sometime an officer in the Bengal Cavalry and husband of a daughter of the 2nd Viscount Guillamore; Ashley George Wilmot Williams (b. 1834), who married, and lived at Cadlington, Blendworth, Horndean in Hampshire; Florence Elizabeth Wilmot Williams (d. 1887), who married Hon. St Leger Richard Glyn; and Gertrude Mary Wilmot Williams, who married Major General Sir Alexander Elliot.

== Military career ==
In December 1849, Williams was promoted from Gentleman Cadet to second lieutenant in the Royal Artillery. Further promotions followed: lieutenant in 1851, second captain (1856), captain (1863), and major (1872). In 1875, he was made a lieutenant colonel and six years later a colonel. During his career, he saw active service in the Crimean War and in central Asia, and was mentioned in despatches during the Indian Mutiny. In 1883, he was appointed a Colonel on the Staff in command of the Royal Artillery at Aldershot, in the place of Colonel William Reilly; two years later, he was appointed an Extra Aide-de-camp to the Duke of Cambridge, and then three years after that he was made major general on the staff commanding troops at Woolwich. In 1892, Williams was made Deputy Adjutant General at the Artillery Headquarters; in 1894, he was placed on retired pay and made an Extra Equerry to the Duke of Cambridge. He remained in the Duke's service, eventually as an equerry, until the Duke's death in 1904, when Edward VII appointed him a Knight Commander of the Royal Victorian Order. The following year, he became Colonel Commandant of the Royal Horse Artillery.

Williams never married. He was a member of the United Service and Turf clubs and died on 29 October 1919.

== Likenesses ==
- Portrait by Walter Stoneman; bromide print, 1917 (6 ^{1}/_{8} in. x 4 ^{3}/_{4} in./155 mm x 120 mm). Housed in the Photographs Collection, National Portrait Gallery, London (ref. number NPG x186167).
