= James Pope (educationalist) =

New Zealand teacher, school inspector, educationalist, amateur astronomer and writer

Personal details
- Born: James Henry Pope; 11 September 1837 St Helier, Channel Islands
- Died: 3 August 1913 (aged 75) Wellington, New Zealand
- Spouse: Helen Grant Rattray (m. 1862)
- Children: 12
- Relatives: Robert J. Pope (son)

James Henry Pope (11 September 1837 – 3 August 1913) was a New Zealand teacher, school inspector, educationalist, amateur astronomer and writer. He was the first Inspector of Native schools in New Zealand in 1880. Pope was one of the founders of the Polynesian Society and was its president from 1899 to 1900. He was the father of the poet, cricketer and teacher Robert J. Pope.

== Early life ==
James Henry Pope was born in St Helier, Channel Islands, on 11 September 1837, the son of Jane Dacombe and her husband James Pope, a retired English confectioner who migrated from Hampshire to Jersey in the early 1830s. He was educated privately in Jersey where he became fluent in French before he emigrated to Melbourne, Australia, with his parents in 1852 aged 15, on the "Castle Eden" and landed at Port Phillip, Melbourne.

Pope spent the next five or so years in the Victorian gold diggings, pursuing his studies at the same time. His scholastic efforts were rewarded with the highest attainable honours of the Victorian Denominational School Board. On 22 December 1862, at Ballarat he married Helen Grant Rattray, daughter of the Sexton of the Ballarat Cemetery, in a Presbyterian service: they were to have 12 children; eight boys and four girls; two of the girls dying at an early age.

== Career ==
=== Teacher ===
In 1858 he was appointed headmaster of a large primary school in Ballarat, a position he held until 1863. In 1864 Pope moved to Dunedin, New Zealand to become assistant master at the High School of Otago (later Otago Boys' High School). He was soon respected for his breadth of knowledge, energy and teaching ability. He was large, untidy, apparently vague in manner, and considered to be unconventional in his methods, but he knew everything that went on in the classroom and kept strict order. He was an accomplished linguist, equally at home, it was said, in Greek, Latin, French and German, and well versed in Hebrew. He was an enthusiastic astronomer and botanist and an accomplished musician. Although unassuming, he had the confidence of his colleagues, and was acting Rector of the school from 1868 to 1869. He transferred to the Otago Girls' High School in 1873, where the principal, Margaret Burn, regarded him as her right-hand man.

In 1876 Pope went back to Ballarat to become rector of Ballarat College, but his health broke down after a few months and he resigned and returned to Dunedin to recuperate. There was a staffing disruption at the Girls' High School in 1878 and as one of the steps to restore confidence in the school, Pope was appointed deputy principal. He continued to be dogged by ill health, and retired at the end of the year, highly esteemed by staff and students alike.

=== First Inspector of Native Schools ===
After a three-month period as an organising teacher in Taranaki in 1879; in January 1880, Pope was appointed to be an organising inspector of the 57 Native schools. This was the first opportunity of the Education Department to exert a direct influence on this branch of the national education system. His role was to supervise the teachers, inspect their work and examine pupils. His title was changed to Inspector of Native Schools in 1885. Pope's first task was to draft the native school code which would provide policy guidelines.

For that period, the Māori schools were well provided with textbooks, teaching equipment and reference books. School gardens, properly fenced, were developed as model gardens for each village. New species of trees and plants were regularly sent to schools for planting in the school glebe.

James Pope became a fluent speaker of Māori and one of the best informed Pākehā of his time on Māori lore and traditions. He won the respect of tribal leaders throughout the country and conferred continually with them to establish schools, keep them in good running order, and ensure that the children of school age attended school regularly. He was known in the villages as "Te Popi".

=== Writer ===
While in Dunedin he was a regular writer of leaders, articles and astronomy notes for the Evening Star. He is remembered for the reading primers he wrote for the native school pupils and for his reader on Māori health and sanitation, "Health for the Māori: A Manual for Use in Native Schools", to be used later as a basis for the marae campaigns of Āpirana Ngata, Reweti Kohere and Tahupōtiki Wiremu Rātana.

== Legacy ==
After Pope's retirement as Chief Inspector of Native Schools in December 1903 he was presented with an Illuminated Address and a beautifully carved bookcase by the Teachers of the Native Schools Teacher's Association. Both are now on display in the Old Government Buildings, Wellington, now the home for the Law School of Victoria University, Wellington. The farewell statement concludes, "...we, the teachers in these schools are compelled reluctantly to bid you farewell.It is no exaggeration to say that your benevolence, your matured wisdom, and your absolute justice have built up between us a relationship quite unique in its paternal character as well as in its warmth and extent".

A silver epergne presented by the Officers of the Education Department is now in the care of Rev Moorie Robinson.

The history of the telescope owned by Pope is described by Dodson, Tony (1996). "The With-Browning Telescope at Pauatahunui". Southern Stars. 37 (2): 45. Bibcode:1996SouSt..37...45D. He stated that Ida Fownes inherited the instrument when the Fownes bought 34 Kelburn Parade from the widow of Frederick Sidney Pope who had in turn inherited the property and telescope from his father James Henry Pope in 1913.

William Renwick in his biography wrote, "All references to James Henry Pope mention his modesty, the breadth of his sympathies, the range of his interests and his considerable talents. He was, Rēweti Kōhere wrote, 'of a lovable nature and so perfectly transparent that he won your respect and confidence on your first meeting.' He was also one among a handful of men who shaped the direction of public education in this country and left a valued personal stamp on its ethos".

== Published works ==
- Health for the Māori: A Manual for Use in Native Schools, Government Printer, 1901 – 152 pages
- Education: Native Schools, New Zealand Parliament, Government Printer, 1881 – 17 pages
- Lessons in Reading and Spelling for Use in Native Schools, Government Printer, 1894 – 46 pages
- The Native School Reader for Standards II and III: To be Used with Royal Readers I and II, Or Other Reading-books of Similar Difficulty, Government Printer, 1886 – 116 pages
- Education: Native Schools; Education : Deaf-and-dumb Institutions, Government Print, 1881 – 22 pages
- The State: The Rudiments of New Zealand Sociology; for the Use of Beginners, Government Printer, 1887 – 327 pages
- Key to reading lessons for native schools, George Didsbury, Government Printer, 1884 – 14 pages "Accompaniment to a textbook on reading for young Māori schoolchildren"—BIM.
- Te pukapuka kura Maori: he korero kohikohi, James Henry Pope, Emily Way, G. Didsbury, Kai-ta o te Kawanatanga, 1887 – 144 pages
- Te ora mo te Maori: he pukapuka mo nga kura Maori, James Henry Pope, Samuel Costall, Hamuera Kohitare, Kai-ta a te Kawanatanga, 1896 – 138 pages

The following editions are held by the Alexander Turnbull Library Wellington;

- Health For the Maori; a Manual for use in native schools, First Edition 1884.
- Native School Reader for Stds 2 and 3 1898
- Te Ora Mo Te Maori 1896
