= The Complaisant Lover =

1959 play by Graham Greene

Theatre World cover with Phyllis Calvert and Ralph Richardson in the original production

The Complaisant Lover is a 1959 comedy play by Graham Greene. Consisting of two acts, each of two scenes, the play revolves around an affair between Mary Rhodes and Clive Root, the book seller friend of her husband, Victor. The play takes place in the Rhodes family home and an Amsterdam guesthouse.

== Characters ==
- Victor Rhodes
- William Howard
- Clive Root
- Ann Howard
- Margaret Howard
- Mary Rhodes
- Robin Rhodes
- A Hotel Valet
- Dr Van Droog

== Productions ==
The Complaisant Lover was first produced on 18 June 1959 by John Gielgud at the Globe Theatre London, where it ran for almost a year. The cast included; Ralph Richardson as Victor Rhodes, Paul Scofield as Clive Root and Phyllis Calvert as Mary Rhodes.

The play opened at Broadway's Ethel Barrymore Theatre on 1 November 1961, directed by Glen Byam Shaw; and ran for 101 performances. The cast included Michael Redgrave as Victor Rhodes, Richard Johnson as Clive Root, Googie Withers as Mary Rhodes, 11-year old Nicholas Hammond as Robin Rhodes, and Gene Wilder as the Hotel Valet.

In 1968 the play was staged by director Alan Vaughan Williams at the Liverpool Playhouse with particular critical praise going to actors in secondary roles; including Paul Freeman as Dr Van Droog and Christian Rodska as the valet.

== Critical reception ==
On its Broadway staging, The New York Times praised the production and performances, but concluded, "In the English way "The Complaisant Lover" talks about sex without heat and outrages morality with scarcely the tinkle of a teacup. Very English- and a bit tepid."
