= Alan Vaughan Williams =

British playwright and theatre director (1930–2026)

Alan Vaughan Williams (23 May 1930 – 21 September 2026) was a British playwright and theatre director and producer.

== Life and career ==
Williams began his theatre career in 1960 when he was appointed the company and stage manager of The Old Vic. In 1962 he became the resident producer and director of the Theatre Royal Lincoln (TRL), beginning his tenure there directing and producing The Irregular Verb to Love by Hugh and Margaret Williams. In 1963 he directed the world premiere of Malcolm Sircom and Neil Wilkie's musical Pardon My Language at the TRL. Some of the other plays he directed and produced at the TRL included Terence Rattigan's Ross (1962), Keith Waterhouse's Billy Liar (1962), Maria Marten, or, the Murder in the Red Barn (1963), Arnold Wesker's Chips with Everything (1963), William Shakespeare's Richard II (1964), Bill Naughton's All in Good Time (1964), and Joan Littlewood's Oh, What a Lovely War! (1965).

In 1965 Williams left the TRL to become director of the Northampton Repertory Company; beginning his tenure directing a stage adaptation of Richard Gordon's novel Doctor in the House. That same year he directed Rolf Hochhuth's The Representative at the Birmingham Repertory Theatre. In 1966 he directed the premiere of John Hall's The Little Woman at the Traverse Theatre in Edinburgh. In 1968 he directed Graham Greene's The Complaisant Lover and Aleksei Arbuzov's The Promise at the Liverpool Playhouse. In 1970 he directed Alun Owen's The Rough and Ready Lot at the Greenwich Theatre.

As a playwright, Williams created several pantomimes based on fairy tales that were staged during the Christmas seasons at a variety of theatres. These included adaptations of Mother Goose (TRL, 1965) and Jack and the Beanstalk (1971, Greenwich Theatre) among others. In 1984 his play Matchplay was mounted by the Theatre Wales.

Williams died at a care home in Cardiff, on 21 September 2026, aged 96.
