= Chiefland Middle-High School =

Public school in Florida, United States

Coordinates: 29.486349°N 82.859921°W

Chiefland Middle High School
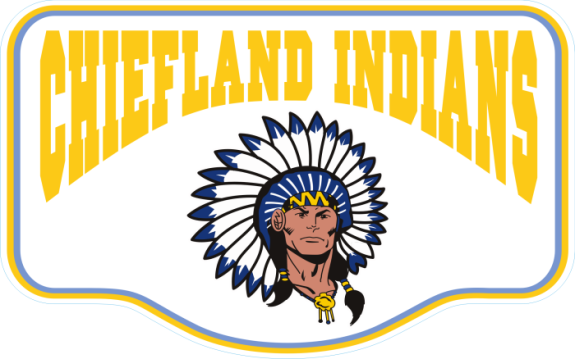

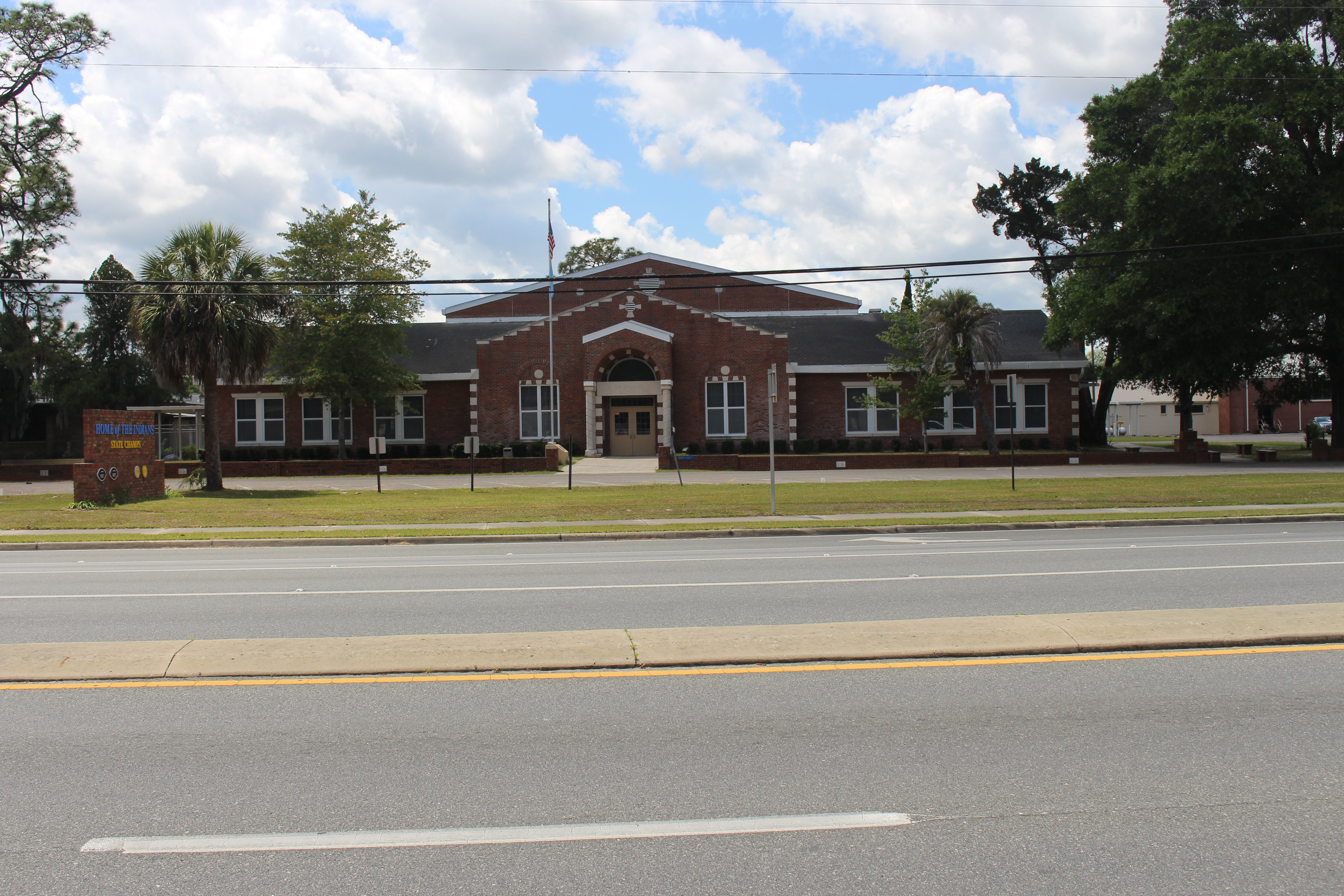

Information
- Type: Public
- Motto: Home of the Indians
- Established: 1922
- School district: Levy County
- Principal: Matt McClelland
- Staff: 37.74 (FTE)
- Grades: 6–12
- Enrollment: 830 (2023–2024)
- Student to teacher ratio: 21.99
- Colors: Columbia blue and gold
- Nickname: Indians
- Website: Official website

Chiefland Middle High School is a public high school in Chiefland, Florida. It is a part of the District School Board of Levy County.

== History ==
The school was founded in 1922 with only ten students in grade nine, thus meeting the required minimum. An additional grade was added in each of the subsequent three years and the first graduating class, composed of just five students, was the Class of 1926.

In 1931 what is now the main building of Chiefland High School was erected. The brick schoolhouse at Hardeetown was moved to the site in 1932 and served for a time as a lunchroom. Later it was renovated to serve as the industrial arts shop and finally in 1979 was moved to its present location to become the Chiefland Community Center.

Using WPA labor in 1940, an agricultural building was added, which served until 1978, at which time a new structure replaced it. A library was built in 1961 and was expanded to double its size in 1978. Original structures still in use include the gymnasium constructed in 1966, succeeded by the addition of a multi-purpose building in 1967. These projects were followed by the auto mechanics building in 1969, the cafeteria in 1971, the special education building in 1973, and, finally, by the masonry building in 1974.

In 1975 Chiefland High School began using two additions that were originally built as part of the Chiefland Elementary School. The first L-shaped building constructed in 1954 consisted of four classrooms and two restrooms. Later that year a second phase added another classroom and a boiler room. In 1964 three additional classrooms and the walkway to the library were completed.

In July 2013, the School Board of Levy County officially designated Chiefland High School as a middle-high school. Furthermore, known as Chiefland Middle High School.
