= Bert Williams (Australian footballer) =

Australian rules footballer

Personal information
- Full name: Albert Charles Williams
- Born: 12 February 1873; Ballarat, Victoria
- Died: 11 November 1955 (aged 82); Melbourne
- Original team: South Ballarat

Playing career^{1}
Years	Club	Games (Goals)
1900	South Melbourne	7 (1)
- ^{1} Playing statistics correct to the end of 1900.

Albert Charles Williams (12 February 1873 – 11 November 1955) was an Australian rules footballer who played with South Melbourne in the Victorian Football League (VFL).
