= Herb Williams (footballer) =

Australian rules footballer

Personal information
- Full name: Herbert Edgar Williams
- Born: 13 July 1885; Geelong, Victoria
- Died: 29 October 1924 (aged 39); Geelong, Victoria
- Original team: Geelong West

Playing career^{1}
Years	Club	Games (Goals)
1905	Geelong	1 (0)
- ^{1} Playing statistics correct to the end of 1905.

Herbert Edgar Williams (13 July 1885 – 29 October 1924) was an Australian rules footballer who played with Geelong in the Victorian Football League (VFL).

He died in a road accident in Geelong on 29 October 1924. A motor car collided with the bicycle he was riding and he sustained a fractured skull.
