= Louis Johnson =

Louis or Lou Johnson may refer to:

== Government and politics ==
- E. Louis Johnson (born 1937), American politician, member of the Kentucky House of Representatives
- Louis A. Johnson (1891–1966), second United States Secretary of Defense
- Louis P. Johnson (1876–1954), American politician, member of the Minnesota Senate
- Stanley Johnson (politician) (Louis Stanley Johnson, 1869–1937), English politician

== Sports ==
- Lou Johnson (1932–2020), American baseball player
- Lou Johnson (pitcher) (1869–1941), baseball player
- Dicta Johnson (Louis Johnson, 1887–?), American baseball pitcher
- Louis Johnson (boxer) (born 1938), American Olympic boxer

== Others ==
- Louis Johnson (poet) (1924–1988), New Zealand poet
- Lou Johnson (singer) (1941–2019), American soul singer
- Louis Johnson (bassist) (1955–2015), American electric bassist
- Louis Johnson (dancer) (1930–2020), American dancer and choreographer

== See also ==
- Llew Johnson (born 2000), New Zealand cricketer
- Louie Johnson (born 2003), English rugby union player
- Lewis Johnson (disambiguation)
