= Alby Williams =

Australian rules footballer, born 1916

Personal information
- Full name: Albert Joseph Williams
- Born: 3 August 1916; Carlton, Victoria
- Height: 180 cm (5 ft 11 in)
- Weight: 83 kg (183 lb)

Playing career^{1}
Years	Club	Games (Goals)
1943	North Melbourne	3 (0)
- ^{1} Playing statistics correct to the end of 1943.

Albert Joseph Williams (born 3 August 1916, date of death unknown) was an Australian rules footballer who played for the North Melbourne Football Club in the Victorian Football League (VFL).

== Family ==
Albert Joseph Williams was born at Carlton, Victoria on 3 August 1916.

He married Doris Vivienne Jackman (1918–1964) in 1940.
