= John Hall (English playwright) =

English playwright

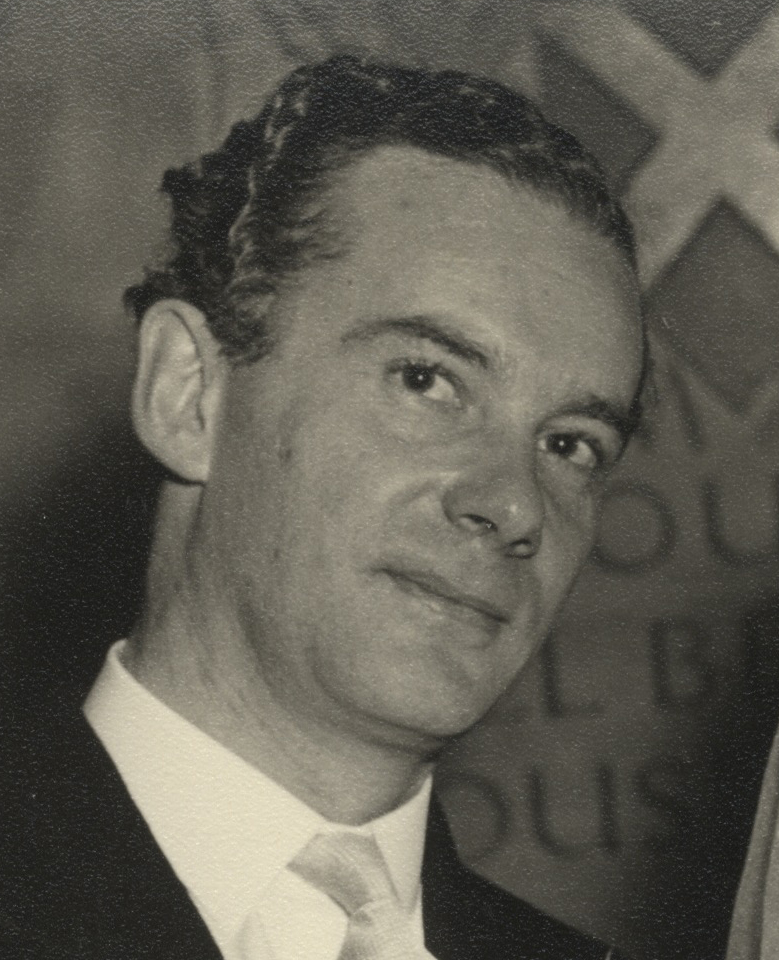
- John Hall in 1960
- Born: 26 June 1925; Saltford, Somerset, England
- Died: 25 March 2001 (aged 75)
- Education: Queens College, Oxford
- Occupation: Playwright

John Clifford Hall (26 June 1925 – 25 March 2001) was an English playwright who wrote over thirty plays for theatre, television and radio.

== Biography ==
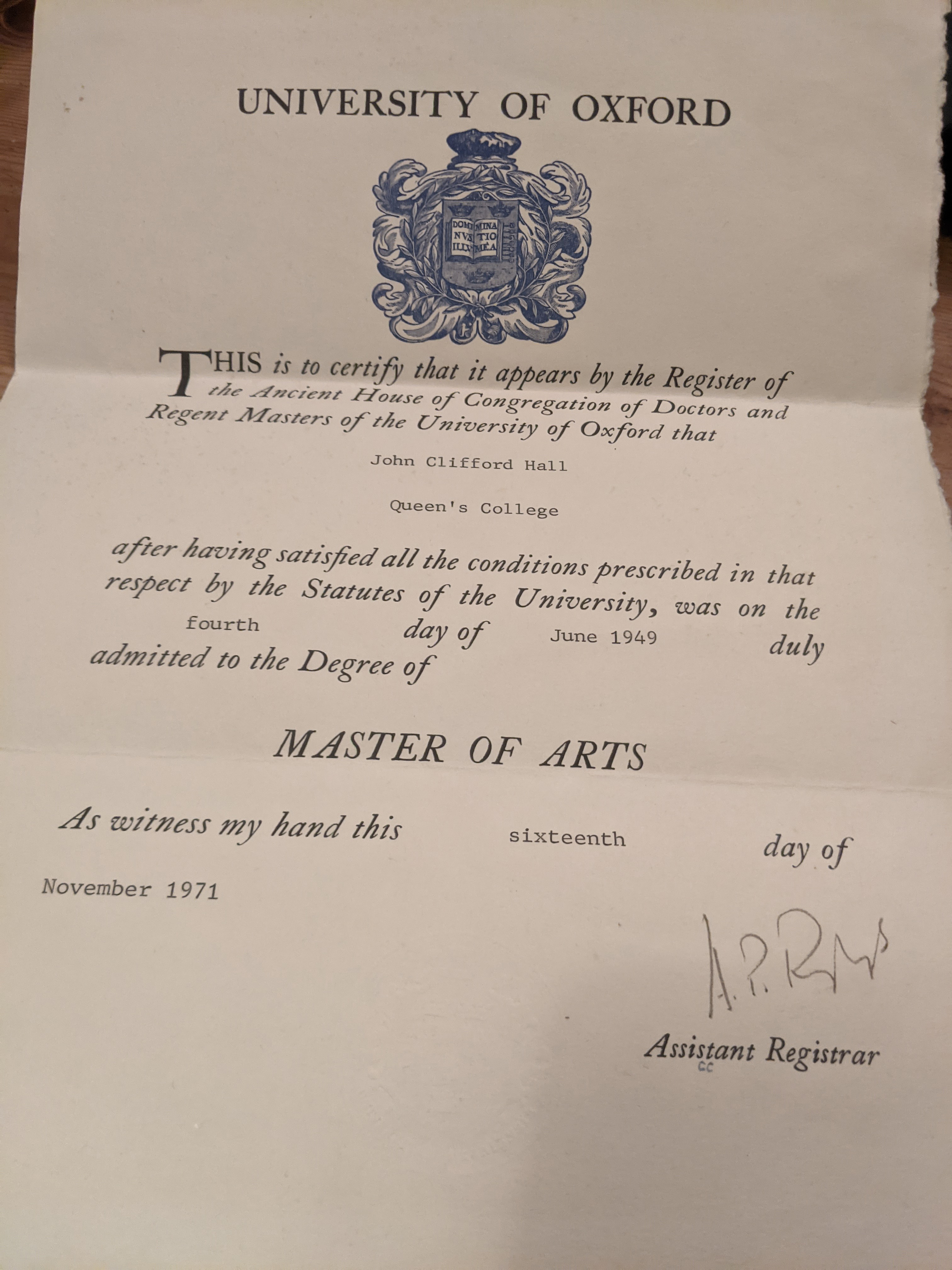
Certificate of MA from Oxford University, John Hall

Hall was educated at Queens College, Oxford, where he studied under C. S. Lewis. Study for his MA was interrupted by service in the Royal Naval Reserve. For this he studied Japanese and worked in Intelligence at Bletchley Park.

His first produced play, World Behind Your Back, was in collaboration with actor William Eedle, at the Mercury Theatre in London in 1952.

Albert Finney starred in one of his most successful plays, The Lizard on the Rock, at Birmingham Repertory Theatre of which Michael Billington wrote: 'Above all, I remember him [Finney] in The Lizard on the Rock by John Hall, which required him to be shot at point-blank range in the stomach: as he suddenly crumpled, uttering cat-like cries, the critic Kenneth Tynan in The Observer described it as "the best fall since Feuillère", who was then queen of the French stage'.

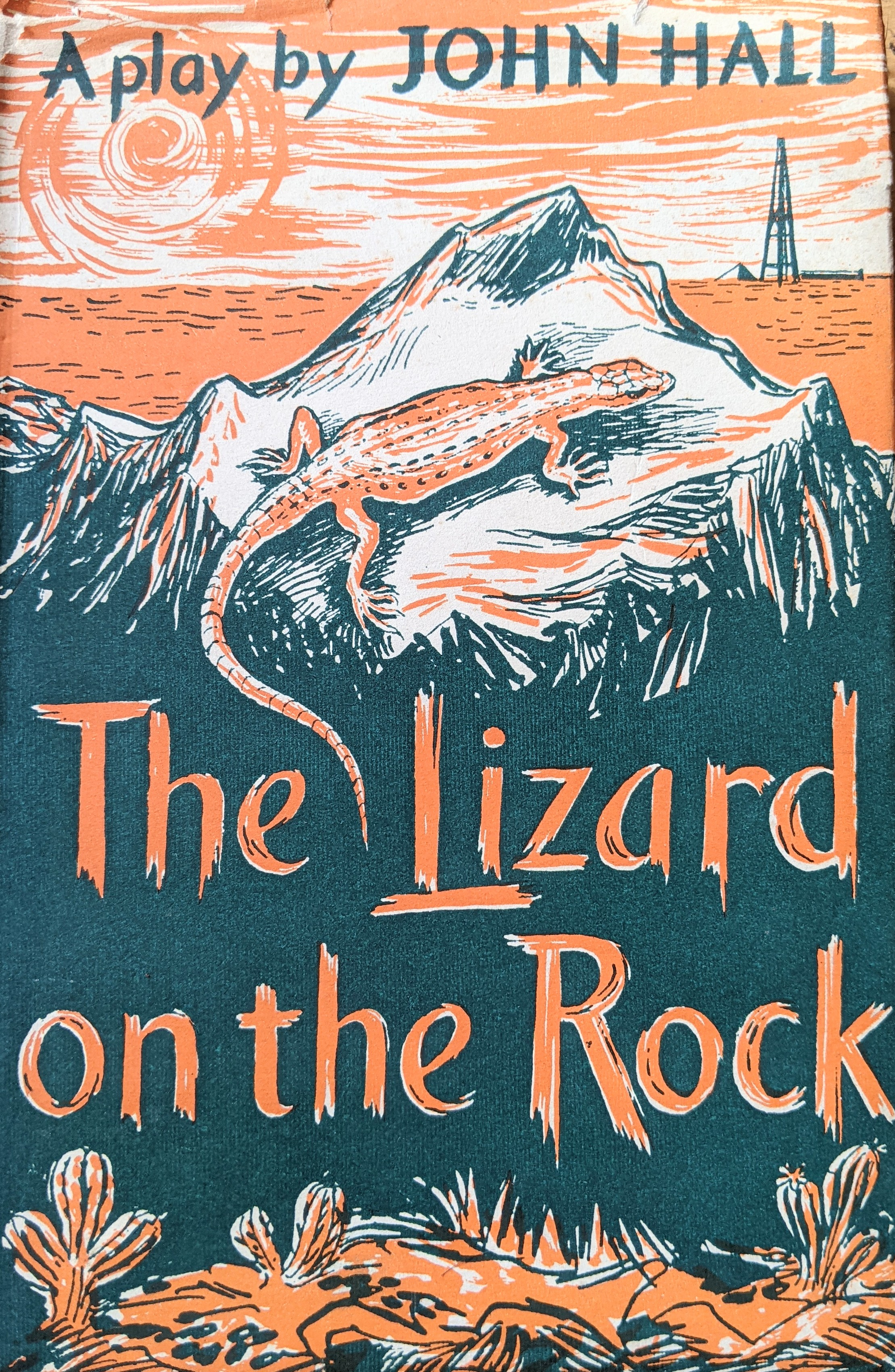
The cover of The Lizard on the Rock, published by Methuen

The Lizard on the Rock was well received. It is a story based around '...an industrialist – a Senator – who is prospecting for water...' '...in the Western Australian desert... the central character [is] outwardly a man of success and power, but faced with the collapse of his achievements...' and the realisation that 'Life cannot depend upon "the blandishments of power; the blind man groping among the useless treasure.'"

Sir John Gielgud was quoted as saying that the play contained 'a great deal of power and originality'. and the playwright Christopher Fry wrote: 'Mr Hall's mind is his own; what he has to say is his own...' The review in The Stage for the Birmingham production of the play read: 'an interesting journey through a variety of tense scenes, each peopled with characters that might in turn be the focal point of the play themselves... Mr. Hall... gives them an aura pregnant with possibilities.' The International Theatre Annual described the blank verse in The Lizard on the Rock as 'Eliotesque'.

Hall wrote his play Exit, Joe, Running influenced by 'the marked contrasts of life at Oxford... and Keele [Universities]... The leading character – within a few months of leaving academia – writes a paper titled "39 Reasons Why University Is No Good"'.

Hall considered the most important playwrights of the 1960s were '...Harold Pinter, Christopher Fry, Robert Bolt, John Arden, John Osborne, Arnold Wesker, Peter Schaeffer and Charles Wood'. He was influenced by Fry during the resurrection of verse drama, and by Anton Chekhov. One of his own favourite plays was Everly, which never got beyond a rehearsed reading. Wrang-Gaites, written for his sons to enjoy, was originally performed by the York Theatre Royal Activists in 1973 and was later set to music at Chichester University. Of Wrang-Gaites, playwright Christopher Fry wrote: 'It is as though the traditional Mummer's Play of St George and the Dragon had spread and ramified and leapt into the twentieth century.'

== Works ==
=== Stage plays ===
- 1957 The Strangers – Bristol Old Vic
- 1957 The Lizard on the Rock – With Albert Finney (Augsberg theatre and Birmingham repertory company)
- 1958 The Holiday – No 1 tour with Sylvia Syms, Sian Phillips and Peter O’Toole
- 1959 The Net – Harrogate Opera House
- 1959 A Pennyworth of Love – Northampton Rep. theatre
- 1962 The Lizard on the Rock – tour and London Phoenix theatre with Sian Phillips, John Laurie and Harry Andrews
- 1963 I, John Brown – with Sir Ian McKellen, Ipswich Arts theatre
- 1965 Convolvulus – Theatre Royal, Windsor
- 1966 The Little Woman – Traverse theatre, Edinburgh
- 1973 Bondi's Dream – Pool Theatre, Edinburgh
- 1973 Alva the Widow – Netherbow, Edinburgh
- 1974 Grass and Sky – Strathclyde University theatre group
- 1976 Skin and Bones – Aberdeen University
- 1976 Wrang-Gaites – York and Aberdeen student productions
- 1977 Everly – workshop production for Scottish society of playwrights
- 1978 Any Horse looks Fast Going Past Trees – Lyceum. Edinburgh

=== Television plays ===
- 1961 The Break-Up, starring Rosalie Crutchley and James Donald – Play of the Week, ITV
- 1963 The Swindler – Armchair theatre, ABC TV
- 1964 Exit Joe, Running, starring Tim Preece – Armchair theatre, ABC TV
- 1984 Movie Queen, with Toyah Willcox and Annie Ross – HTV
- 1985 Child Marlene – BBC2, Thirty Minute Theatre
- 1986 The Proposal – ITV, Love Story series

=== Radio plays ===
- 1982 Chrissie – Radio 4
- 1983 Jackie – Radio 4, Saturday Night theatre
- 1985 The Gaudy – Radio 3
- 1985 In the Venn Country – Radio 4
- 1986 Breakfast at Mother Brown's – Radio 4
- 1987 The Bridge – Radio 4
- 1988 The Little House – Radio 3
- 1989 The Wedding of Jackie – Radio 4
