= Hippolyte André Jean Baptiste Chélard =

19th century French composer

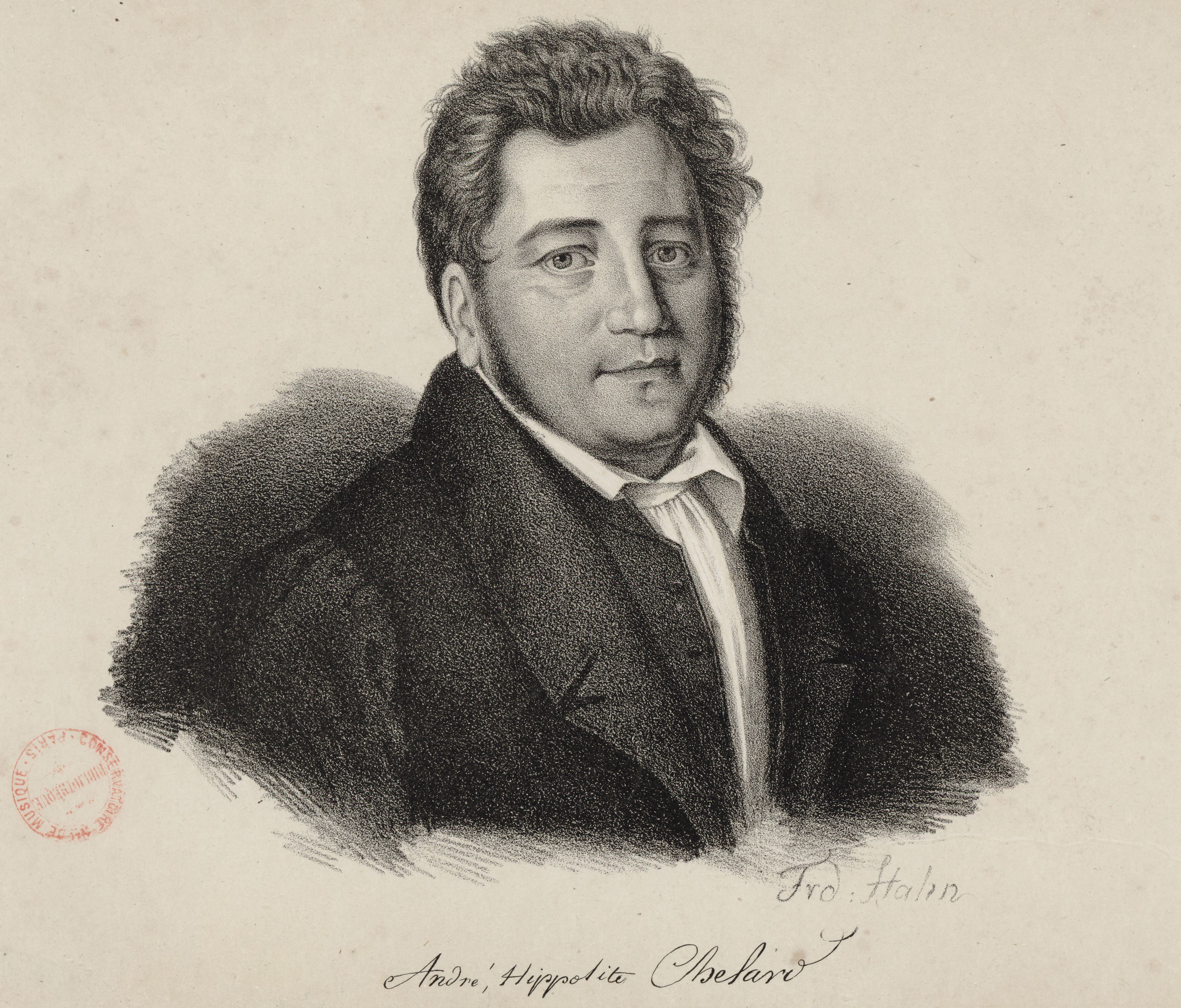
Hippolyte André Jean Baptiste Chélard

Hippolyte André Jean Baptiste Chélard (1 February 1789 – 12 February 1861) was a French composer, violist, and conductor of the Classical era.

He was born in Paris and studied composition with François-Joseph Gossec and viola with Rodolphe Kreutzer. Chélard won the 1811 Prix de Rome for his cantata Ariane.

He earned his living for much of his career as a violist at the Paris Opera. His 1827 opera Macbeth was a flop in Paris, but a great success in Munich. From that time on, he composed for the German market, his most popular work being Die Hunnenschlacht which premiered in Munich in 1835.

The compositions of Chélard reflect a variety of stylistic traditions including the Gluck-Cherubini-Spontini and German Romantic schools. While some his work enjoyed limited success, particularly among amateur keyboardists, it is mostly notable in the development of southern German music at the time. Some aspects of Chélard's music are said to be echoed in the works of Berlioz and Liszt.

He died in Weimar, where he established himself as theater-conductor and in the 1840s he had met, and signed a contract dividing conducting duties with, the newly arrived Franz Liszt.

== Bibliography ==
- Walker, Alan. Franz Liszt. v. 2. The Weimar years, 1848-1861. Ithaca, New York: Cornell University Press. 1989, 1993. ISBN 0-8014-9721-3. Many references to Chélard.
