= Lynching of Albert Williams =

1927 lynching of a Black man in Florida

Coordinates: 29°28′54″N 82°51′44″W

- Location: Chiefland, Florida, U.S.
- Date: July 21, 1927; 99 years ago
- Attack type: Lynching
- Deaths: 1
- Victim: Albert Williams

Albert Williams was an African-American man who was lynched by a mob in Chiefland, Florida, on July 21, 1927.

John R. Steelman, who wrote his PhD dissertation on "mob action in the South", listed Albert Williams, and cited a local newspaper: "Albert Williams, charged with assault on a turpentine operator, was shot to death by a mob. The trouble is said to have arisen over a debt which Williams owed the white man."
