= Herbert Williams (cricketer, born 1860) =

English cricketer

Herbert Williams (4 September 1860 – 30 November 1942) was an English cricketer. He was a wicket-keeper who played for Middlesex. He was born and died in Dorset.

Williams played in one first-class match in the 1890 season, against Kent. Williams scored one run in the first innings and a duck in the second.

Williams played in one miscellaneous match for Middlesex, against Somerset, two weeks after his first-class appearance, in which despite making a catch in the Somerset first innings, he scored a duck and was absent in the two innings in which Middlesex batted. He was a lower-order batsman.
