= Herb Williams (comedian) =

American pianist, comedian, and actor (1884–1936)

- Born: Herbert Schussler Billerbeck; May 24, 1884; Philadelphia, Pennsylvania, U.S.
- Died: October 1, 1936 (aged 52); Freeport, New York, U.S.
- Occupation(s): Comedian, pianist

Herb Williams (born Herbert Schussler Billerbeck; May 24, 1884 – October 1, 1936) was an American pianist, comic entertainer in vaudeville, and actor.

== Life and career ==
Born in Philadelphia, Pennsylvania, Herbert Billerbeck trained as a classical pianist at the Philadelphia Conservatory of Music. As an amateur performer he teamed up with singer Hilda Wolfus, and the pair performed as a comic duo, Williams and Wolfus, marrying in 1909. They developed a vaudeville act that played on their physical differences (he was heavy and ungainly, she was thin), and performed various surreal and comedic acts such as him eating her earrings, producing beer or chickens from their trick piano which then fell to pieces, and so forth. They first appeared at the Palace Theatre in New York City in 1915.

After Williams and Wolfus split up in 1926, Williams performed solo, assisted by his second wife, Jean Halpin. He was a popular headline act in vaudeville from the mid-1920s to the mid-1930s. In addition, he appeared in the 1930 version of The Earl Carroll Vanities, and in the 1934 play The Farmer Takes a Wife. He also featured in the 1936 film Rose of the Rancho.

He died in Freeport, New York, in 1936, from pneumonia at the age of 52.
