= William Edward Moyses Reilly =

British Army general

Major-General William Edward Moyses Reilly (13 July 1827 – 28 July 1886), born Scarva, County Down, on 13 January 1827, was fourth son of James Miles Reilly of Cloon Eavin, Co. Down, by Emilia, second daughter of the Rev Hugh Montgomery of Grey Abbey. He was educated at Christ's Hospital, and at the age of fifteen became a cadet at the Royal Military Academy Woolwich.

== Biography ==
Reilly was commissioned as second lieutenant in the Royal Artillery on 18 December 1845, promoted first lieutenant on 3 April 1846 and second captain on 17 February 1854. In that year he was appointed aide-de-camp to General Fox-Strangways, who commanded the artillery in the Crimea; but, on his way out from England, he learned that Strangways had been killed in the battle of Inkerman. He went on to the Crimea, and volunteered for service as a battery officer. He was employed in the trenches through the winter, and in February 1855 he was made adjutant (and subsequently brigade-major) of the siege train. He was present at the several bombardments, and was three times mentioned in despatches. He received a brevet majority on 2 November 1855, the Légion d'honneur of France, and the fifth class of the Medjidie, and was created a companion of the Order of the Bath. After the fall of Sebastopol he was deputy-adjutant quartermaster-general at the headquarters of the army till it left the Crimea in June 1856. From December 1856 to April 1859 Reilly was aide-de-camp to Sir Richard Dacres, commanding the Royal Artillery in Ireland, and, under Dacres's direction, he compiled the official account of the artillery operations of the siege of Sebastopol.

During the war of 1866 between Prussia and Austria he was sent out as British commissioner with the Prussian army, but could not join it till 19 July, when the fighting was over. He wrote a memorandum on the Prussian army, or rather on its system of supply and transport, as tested in the field, and on its artillery material. While generally favourable, he blamed the hospital arrangements, and he pronounced the breech-loading guns inferior to muzzle-loading guns, and, for some purposes, even to smooth-bores.

Reilly became regimental lieutenant-colonel in 1868, and next year was the guest of Lord Mayo in India, whence he wrote some descriptive letters to The Times newspaper. He spoke French fluently, and at the end of October 1870, while the siege of Paris was going on, he was sent out as extra military attaché to the British embassy at Tours. He at once joined the headquarters of the French army of the Loire, and became the channel for distributing British contributions in aid of the wounded. He was present at the Battle of Beaune-la-Rolande, and the subsequent battles in front of Orléans. The hurried evacuation of Orléans by the French in the night of 4 December took place without his knowledge. He was arrested there next morning by the Prussians, and sent to England by way of Saarbrücken and Belgium. He wished to rejoin the British embassy, then at Bordeaux, but the British government decided that he should not. In recognition of his services the French government raised him to the grade of officer of the Legion of Honour on 20 March 1872, and commander on 4 November 1878.

From April 1871 to January 1876 he was employed in the War Office as assistant director of artillery. During this time he made several visits abroad to report on artillery questions: to Berlin in 1872 to France and to the Vienna exhibition in 1873. He also accompanied the Duke of Edinburgh to Russia in 1874. In his reports he still adhered to his preference for muzzle-loading guns, and did not think Great Britain had much to borrow from foreign artillery.

He became brevet–colonel on 22 August 1873, and regimental colonel on 25 September 1877. In January 1879 he was appointed to command the royal artillery at Aldershot, but in the following month he was sent out to South Africa, in a similar capacity, to take part in the Zulu War, which was then entering on its second stage. While he was inspecting one of his batteries his horse fell with him, and broke his wrist; and this prevented his being present at Ulundi. After his return, in 1883, he became director of artillery at the war office, with the temporary rank of brigadier-general. He resigned this post at the end of 1884 on account of ill-health.

On 1 May 1885 lie was appointed inspector-general of artillery, with the rank of major-general. On 28 July 1886 he died on board the steamer Mistletoe while engaged in the inspection of the artillery at Guernsey. He was buried with military honours at Cheriton, near Sandgate. A tablet and window in memory of him were put up in St. George's garrison church at Woolwich by his brother-officers.

Reilly's knowledge of all matters pertaining to his arm of the service was most comprehensive, and as a practical artilleryman he had no rival. The energy that underlay his normal composure was conspicuously shown in the last months of his life, when he vindicated the ordnance department from the charges formulated by Colonel Hope in the columns of the Times. 'I deny the charges you make; I defy you to prove them; I assert that they are false!' was the last emphatic declaration of Reilly, written from Guernsey. A commission on warlike stores was appointed, under the chairmanship of Sir James Fitzjames Stephen to investigate the allegations; its report supported the charge of weak administration, but refuted that of corruption.

== Works ==
Reilly published, besides pamphlets on the artillery or military organisation of France and Prussia:

1. An Account of the Artillery Operations before Sebastopol 4to, 1859 (written by desire of the Secretary of State for War).
2. Military Forces of the Kingdom pamphlet, 1867.
3. Supply of Ammunition to an Army in the Field, pamphlet, 1873.
4. War Material at the Vienna Exhibition, pamphlet, 1873.
