= Alfred Williams (cricketer) =

English cricketer

Alfred Edward Augustus Williams (born 20 November 1844) was an English cricketer active who played in three first-class cricket matches for Kent County Cricket Club in 1865.

Williams was born at Ashford in Kent in 1844, the son of John and Catherine Williams. His father was a wine merchant and Williams followed him into the profession. He is first recorded as having played cricket for Kent's professional Colts in 1863 and, despite making little impression in Colts cricket, played in three First XI matches for the county in 1865. On his debut, against Sussex at Gravesend he scored 13 not out and took three wickets. These were his best figures for Kent. His other matches came during the same season, both played against Yorkshire.

It is possible that Williams played for the Gentlemen of Kent amateurs in 1867, although as a professional colt this is considered doubtful. At the 1871 census he was living in Ashford but was unemployed. There is no record of him after this, although ESPNcricinfo's database records his death occurred in January 1914 at Lyminge in Kent aged 69. This is not recorded in other sources and it is possible he may have emigrated.

== Bibliography ==
- Carlaw, Derek (2020). Kent County Cricketers, A to Z: Part One (1806–1914) (PDF). Cardiff: ACS.
