= Herbert Williams (cricketer, born 1900) =

English cricketer

Herbert Reginald Hewett Williams (7 June 1900 – 17 July 1974) was an English cricketer active from 1919 to 1920 who played for Essex. He was born in Hendon, Middlesex, and died in Denmark Hill, London. He appeared in ten first-class matches as a righthanded batsman and wicketkeeper. He scored 67 runs with a highest score of 23* and took 18 catches with seven stumpings.
