= Luigi Antonio Sabbatini =

Italian composer and music theorist

Luigi Antonio Sabbatini (1732, Albano Laziale, Italy – January 29, 1809, Padua, Italy) was an Italian composer and music theorist. He studied music at Bologna in the Franciscan Monastery, under Father Giovanni Battista Martini. He published a textbook on the theoretical elements of music, in 1789, in three volumes, a treatise on fugues, in 1802. He also contributed to the use of numerical signatures of musical harmony. In May 1807, he was elected to the Accademia Italiana.

== Bibliography ==
- Sabbatini, LA. Trattato Sopra le Fughe Musicali. Venezia, 1802.
- Sabbatini, LA. Elementi Teorici della Musica. Roma, 1789–1790.
- Sabbatini, LA. La Vera Idea degli Musicali Numeriche Signature, Diretta al Giovane Studioso dell'Armonia. Venezia, 1799.
