= Ludwig Wilhelm Maurer =

German composer, conductor and violinist

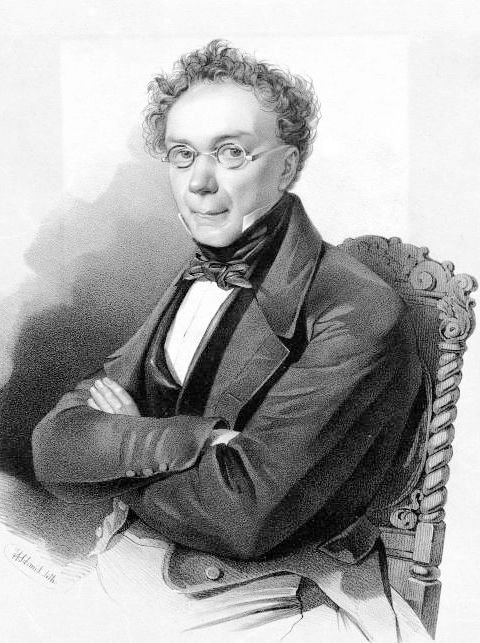
Ludwig Wilhelm Maurer

Ludwig Wilhelm Maurer (February 8, 1789 – October 13–25, 1878) was a German composer, conductor, and violinist born in Potsdam. In 1802, he debuted in Berlin with his first major violin performance. After a brief period of studying French violin style in Mitau (Latvia), Maurer went to Russia at age 17 in 1806, where he would stay for most of his life. For this reason, Maurer is considered both a German and a Russian composer.

Upon his arrival in St. Petersburg, Maurer performed extensively until the French violinist and composer Pierre Baillot aided Maurer in becoming the conductor of the Count Vsevolozhsky's orchestra in Moscow. Maurer conducted the orchestra until 1817 when he toured as a performer in Germany and Paris. In 1819 Maurer began using Hanover as a base for directing and conducting, while touring and composing. During this period Maurer also maintained a composing partnership with Aleksey Nikolayevich Verstovsky in the opera-vaudeville form. Toward the end of this period in Maurer's life, he toured Germany with his sons Vsevolod and Alexis, who played violin and cello respectively.

By 1833, however, Maurer was back in St. Petersburg, where he would remain for the rest of his life. The following year Maurer appeared as the soloist in the first performance of Beethoven's Violin Concerto in Russia. In 1835 Maurer became the conductor and director of the French Opera in St. Petersburg. He attained other positions in the St. Petersburg music scene and continued to compose until his death in October 1878.

== Important works ==
- Opera:
  - Der Neue Paris, 1826
  - Der entdeckte Diebstahl, 1826
  - Aloise, 1828
  - Die Runenschrift, 1830
- Symphony in F minor, op. 67
- Sinfonia concertante, op. 55
- Violin concertos 1–10
- String quartets 1–6
- various opera-vaudevilles
- Twelve Little Pieces for Brass
