= Albert Lynn Williams =

American businessman

Albert Lynn Williams (March 17, 1911 – 1982) was an American business executive who was president of IBM from May 1961 until March 1966.

Born in Berwick, Pennsylvania, Williams attended Beckley College and became a Certified Public Accountant. He worked for IBM in sales positions from 1938 until 1942, when he was promoted to a position at IBM corporate headquarters in New York City.

According to the IBM corporate website, Williams was elected IBM Controller in November 1942, IBM Treasurer in 1947, and Vice President and Treasurer in 1948. The IBM Board of Directors elected him a member in July 1951. In 1954, he was elected Executive President and, in May 1961, president of IBM. Williams became a member of the IBM Board's Executive and Finance Committee in 1956.

He chaired the President Commission on International Trade and Investment Policy, appointed by Richard Nixon on 21 May 1970.
