= William Watson Bird =

New Zealand headmaster, school inspector, administrator and Maori linguist

William Watson Bird (8 February 1870 – 11 November 1954) was a New Zealand headmaster, school inspector, educational administrator and Maori linguist. He was born in Crookham Common, Hampshire, England on 8 February 1870.
