= William Hamilton Bird =

18th century Irish-born musician

William Hamilton Bird was an Irish musician who was active in India during Company rule. He was a pioneer in transcribing Indian music into western notation.

The publication for which he is remembered appeared in Calcutta (now known as Kolkata) the capital of British-held territories in 1789. The Oriental Miscellany; being a collection of the most favourite airs of Hindoostan, compiled and adapted for the Harpsichord consists of about 30 pieces plus a flute sonata. The book was republished in Edinburgh (c. 1805 after Bird's death) with a slightly different selection of pieces.

== Biography ==
Little is known of Bird´s early life. He appears to have come from Dublin, and by his own account he travelled to India in about 1770, remaining there until the 1790s.

Bird's transcriptions of Indian music can be seen in the broad context of European interest in "national" music, evidenced by publications of Irish and Scottish folk-song arrangements, such as the 25 Scottish Songs of Beethoven. They can also be seen in the context of a mingling of cultures in late 18th century India, as described, for example by the historian William Dalrymple. The first edition of Bird's work was dedicated to Warren Hastings, the de facto Governor-General of India from 1773 to 1785. Hastings was interested in Indian music and Indian culture generally, he had promoted the first translation into English of the Bhagavad Gita. Other members of the British community who were interested in Indian music included:

- the judge Sir William Jones, who arrived in Calcutta in 1783. Best remembered as a philologist, his work "On the Musical Modes of the Hindus" was published posthumously in 1799. He is known to have been involved in the transcription of song lyrics.
- Sophia Plowden, an amateur musician who arrived in Calcutta in 1777 and also lived in the princely state of Oudh. Plowden was one of the 250 subscribers to the "Oriental Airs".

The music came from an oral tradition, and we are not in a position to compare the transcriptions directly with the original versions. However, there is little doubt that in various ways, Bird's transcriptions are not faithful to the original versions:

- Bird avoided microtonality (shruti), a feature of Indian music. The tuning system of the main instrument he featured, the harpsichord, does not give much scope for microtonality.
- in the introduction to the Miscellany, Bird indicates that he struggled with Indian rhythms. When adapting the music to western taste, he avoided the more complicated rhythms, working with multiples of two or three beats per bar. Katherine Butler Schofield suggests that where the lyrics survive their metres call for more complicated rhythms, such as seven beats per bar, which would have been outside the experience of musicians in Europe.
- he added harmonies, whereas the Indian tradition is monophonic.

== Sources ==
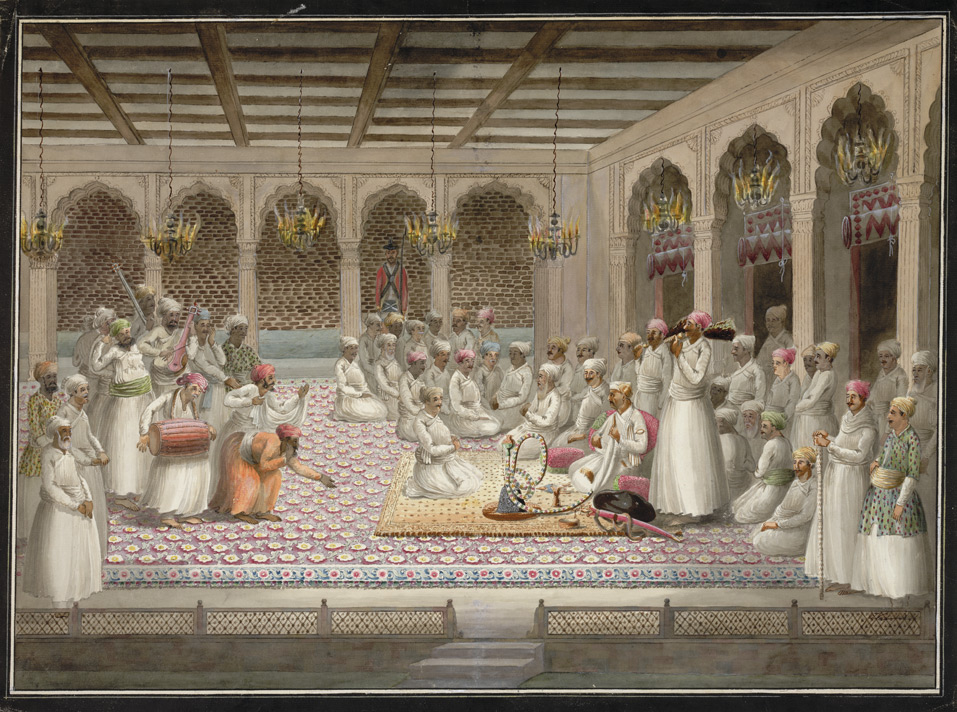
Asaf-ud-Daula listens to musicians at his Lucknow court

Bird appears to have collected his material from live performances of genres such as tappa (a mainly vocal tradition). Sometimes he indicates the singer associated with the piece.

=== Sophia Plowden ===
Bird's transcriptions appear to reflect the work of uncredited collaborators such as Sophia Plowden. In the 1780s she compiled her own collection of airs from Lucknow, which Asaf-ud-Daula had made the capital of Oudh in 1775. Plowden`s manuscript is preserved in the Fitzwilliam Museum, Cambridge as MS 380. In its choice of tunes it overlaps with the Bird collection. There are transcriptions of lyrics in nastaliq calligraphy as well as music, and Plowden thus facilitates the restoration of North Indian words to some of the pieces in Bird's book (which supplies Urdu titles but not lyrics). Katherine Butler Schofield has examined the evidence that Plowden was Bird's source for some of the tunes he published. She is known to have been an admirer of the nautch girl Khanum Jan, one of the singers referenced in Bird's work.

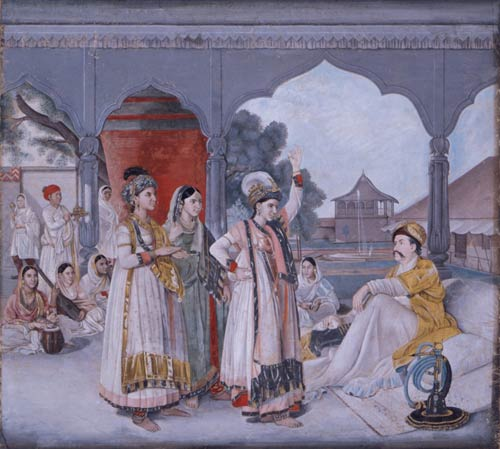
Colonel Antoine-Louis Henri Polier watching a nautch at Faizabad

== Live and recorded performances ==
The British label Signum Classics released a recording of the "Oriental Miscellany" in 2015 featuring the harpsichordist Jane Chapman. It received international attention. Jane Chapman had studied the music in a project supported by the Leverhulme Trust. She played a 1722 Jacob Kirckman instrument in the Horniman Museum, London. For the recording it was tuned in Vallotti temperament, (rather than equal temperament which has become the norm for fixed-pitch instruments in Western music). This non-standard tuning gives the player more scope for an approximation of the modes (ragas) of Indian music.

Bird's work is also in the repertoire of other harpsichordists, for example Mahan Esfahani.

== See also ==
- Hindustani classical music
