= 1975–76 Hereford United F.C. season =

Hereford United
1975–76 season
- Chairman: Frank Miles
- Manager: John Sillett
- Stadium: Edgar Street
- Division Three: 1st
- League Cup: Second round
- FA Cup: Third round
- Welsh Cup: Runners-up
- Top goalscorer: League: Dixie McNeil (35); All: Dixie McNeil (38)
- Highest home attendance: 12,970 v Crystal Palace, Division Three, 31 January 1976
- Lowest home attendance: 1,994 v Porthmadog, Welsh Cup, 18 February 1976
- Average home league attendance: 8,273
- Biggest win: 5–0 v Chester (H), Division Three, 10 March 1976
- Biggest defeat: 1–4 v Burnley (H), League Cup, 10 September 1975

The 1975–76 season was the 47th season of competitive football played by Hereford United Football Club and their fourth in the Football League. The club competed in Division Three, as well as the League Cup, Welsh Cup and FA Cup.

== Summary ==
Hereford clinched their second promotion in four years as a league club by finishing as champions of Division Three, six points clear of second-placed Cardiff City.

After winning only one of their opening five league matches, Hereford gained momentum as results improved through the autumn and winter, and went top for the first time with a 4–1 win over Cardiff at the start of February. A crowd of 35,549 saw the Welsh club claim a 2–0 win in the return fixture at Ninian Park on 14 April, but Hereford's promotion was confirmed the following Saturday by a goalless draw at Walsall, with the championship following two days later courtesy of a 3–1 win over Shrewsbury Town.

The squad was bolstered by the arrival of goalkeeper Kevin Charlton, full-back Steve Ritchie, midfielder Jimmy Lindsay and forward Steve Davey. Charlton displaced Tommy Hughes as first-choice keeper, Ritchie and Lindsay were both ever-present, and Davey's 18 league goals took some of the scoring burden off Dixie McNeil. Nevertheless, a hat-trick against Preston North End in the final match of the season meant McNeil finished as leading scorer in the Football League for the second successive year, with a haul of 35 goals. He also became the first Hereford player to score four goals in a league match, doing so in a 5–0 win over Chester.

Veteran midfielder Terry Paine achieved a notable feat when he made his 765th league appearance in Hereford's home match against Peterborough United on 25 October. This established a new Football League record, overtaking the previous record of 764 held by Portsmouth's Jimmy Dickinson.

== Squad ==
Players who made one appearance or more for Hereford United F.C. during the 1975-76 season

Pos.	Nat.	Name	League		League Cup		FA Cup		Welsh Cup		Total	
Pos.	Nat.	Name	Apps	Goals	Apps	Goals	Apps	Goals	Apps	Goals	Apps	Goals
GK	ENG	Kevin Charlton	35	0	3	0	3	0	3	0	44	0
GK	SCO	Tommy Hughes	11	0	1	0	1	0	4	0	17	0
DF	IRE	Tony Byrne	1(1)	0	1	0	0	0	4(1)	2	6(2)	2
DF	ENG	Steve Emery	45	2	4	0	4	0	5	0	58	2
DF	WAL	Mark Evans	0	0	0	0	0	0	1	0	1	0
DF	ENG	John Galley	35	2	3	0	0	0	3	0	41	2
DF	ENG	John Layton	38	6	2	0	4	2	5	1	49	9
DF	WAL	Julian Marshall	0	0	0	0	0	0	1	0	1	0
DF	SCO	Steve Ritchie	46	1	4	1	4	0	3	0	57	2
DF	ENG	David Rylands	2	0	0	0	1	0	2	0	5	0
DF	ENG	Billy Tucker	17(2)	2	3	0	3	1	4	0	27(2)	2
MF	ENG	Les Briley	0	0	0	0	0	0	1	0	1	0
MF	ENG	Roy Carter	33	5	4	2	1(1)	1	4	0	42(1)	8
MF	ENG	Paul Courtney	0	0	0	0	0	0	1	0	1	0
MF	SCO	Jimmy Lindsay	46	2	4	2	4	0	5	2	59	6
MF	SCO	Jim McCafferty	0(3)	0	0	0	1	0	2	0	3(3)	0
MF	ENG	Terry Paine	40(4)	1	2(2)	1	4	0	2	1	48(6)	3
MF	ENG	Brian Preece	0	0	0	0	0	0	3(1)	1	3(1)	1
MF	ENG	David Rudge	1(1)	0	0	0	0	0	1	0	2(1)	0
MF	IRE	Kevin Sheedy	1	0	0	0	0	0	0	0	1	0
MF	ENG	Barry Silkman	12(10)	1	1	0	0(2)	0	3(1)	1	16(13)	2
MF	ENG	Peter Spiring	5(1)	0	0	0	0	0	0	0	5(1)	0
MF	ENG	Dudley Tyler	34	5	0	0	4	1	3(1)	0	41(1)	6
MF	WAL	Shane Walker	7(2)	2	3	0	2	0	4(1)	1	16(3)	3
FW	ENG	Steve Davey	42(3)	18	3(1)	0	4	0	5(1)	3	54(5)	21
FW	ENG	Dixie McNeil	40(1)	35	3	0	4	2	4	1	51	38
FW	ENG	Eric Redrobe	15(5)	1	3	0	0	0	4	1	22(5)	2

== League table ==
Pos	Team	Pld	W	D	L	GF	GA	GAv	Pts	Qualification or relegation
1	Hereford United (C, P)	46	26	11	9	86	55	1.564	63	Promotion to the Second Division
2	Cardiff City (P)	46	22	13	11	69	48	1.438	57	Cup Winners' Cup preliminary round and promotion to the Second Division
3	Millwall (P)	46	20	16	10	54	43	1.256	56	Promotion to the Second Division
4	Brighton & Hove Albion	46	22	9	15	78	53	1.472	53	
5	Crystal Palace	46	18	17	11	61	46	1.326	53	

Rules for classification: 1) Points; 2) Goal average; 3) Goals scored
(C) Champions; (P) Promoted

== Results ==
=== Third Division ===
16 August 1975 1	Hereford United	0–0	Port Vale	Hereford
				Stadium: Edgar Street; Attendance: 6,219

24 August 1975 2	Rotherham United	1–1	Hereford United	Rotherham
	Breckin 31'		Carter 29'	Stadium: Millmoor; Attendance: 3,825

30 August 1975 3	Hereford United	3–1	Sheffield Wednesday	Hereford
	Tucker 39'; McNeil 66', 84' (pen.)		Henson 79'	Stadium: Edgar Street; Attendance: 7,017

6 September 1975 4	Millwall	1–0	Hereford United	London
	Hill 87'			Stadium: The Den; Attendance: 6,066

13 September 1975 5	Hereford United	0–0	Colchester United	Hereford
				Stadium: Edgar Street; Attendance: 5,577

20 September 1975 6	Chesterfield	2–3	Hereford United	Chesterfield
	Darling 58' (pen.); Burton 69'		McNeil 50'; Silkman 77'; Redrobe 86'	Stadium: Saltergate; Attendance: 3,000

24 September 1975 7	Hereford United	1–0	Swindon Town	Hereford
	Emery 8'			Stadium: Edgar Street; Attendance: 6,423

27 September 1975 8	Hereford United	1–1	Gillingham	Hereford
	Davey 78'		Shipperley 80'	Stadium: Edgar Street; Attendance: 5,512

4 October 1975 9	Chester	0–1	Hereford United	Chester
			Davey 78'	Stadium: Sealand Road; Attendance: 4,144

11 October 1975 10	Hereford United	2–0	Wrexham	Hereford
	Layton 23'; Davey 78'			Stadium: Edgar Street; Attendance: 6,228

18 October 1975 11	Halifax Town	0–1	Hereford United	Halifax
			Tyler 40'	Stadium: The Shay; Attendance: 2,667

21 October 1975 12	Crystal Palace	2–2	Hereford United	London
	Swindlehurst 41'; Taylor 56' (pen.)		Layton 58'; Tyler 79'	Stadium: Selhurst Park; Attendance: 20,232

25 October 1975 13	Hereford United	2–4	Peterborough United	Hereford
	Lindsay 38' (pen.); Davey 86'		Gregory 15'; Turner 59', 75'; Nixon 81'	Stadium: Edgar Street; Attendance: 8,471

1 November 1975 14	Preston North End	3–4	Hereford United	Preston
	Baxter 4'; Morley 60' (pen.); Treacy 63'		Davey 2'; Tucker 31'; McNeil 57'; Lindsay 61'	Stadium: Deepdale; Attendance: 9,682

8 November 1975 15	Hereford United	3–2	Grimsby Town	Hereford
	McNeil 9', 74'; Davey 70'		Wigg 52'; Barton 72'	Stadium: Edgar Street; Attendance: 6,391

29 November 1975 16	Hereford United	2–0	Bury	Hereford
	McNeil 18' (pen.); Davey 83'			Stadium: Edgar Street; Attendance: 6,867

6 December 1975 17	Brighton & Hove Albion	4–2	Hereford United	Hove
	Binney 7'; Mellor 43'; Martin 67', 73'		Tyler 41'; Carter 76'	Stadium: Goldstone Ground; Attendance: 17,811

20 December 1975 18	Aldershot	0–2	Hereford United	Aldershot
			McNeil 64'; Walker 83'	Stadium: Recreation Ground; Attendance: 4,113

26 December 1975 19	Hereford United	1–3	Walsall	Hereford
	Davey 22'		Evans 37'; Buckley 46', 84'	Stadium: Edgar Street; Attendance: 10,891

27 December 1975 20	Shrewsbury Town	2–1	Hereford United	Shrewsbury
	Durban 38', 45'		Walker 83'	Stadium: Gay Meadow; Attendance: 9,488

10 January 1976 21	Sheffield Wednesday	1–2	Hereford United	Sheffield
	Shaw 8'		Davey 22'; McNeil 47'	Stadium: Hillsborough; Attendance: 8,155

17 January 1976 22	Hereford United	4–2	Chesterfield	Hereford
	Hunter 12' (o.g.); Layton 35'; McNeil 43', 72'		Bailey 55'; Shanahan 73' (pen.)	Stadium: Edgar Street; Attendance: 5,999

24 January 1976 23	Colchester United	1–4	Hereford United	Colchester
	Telford 3'		McNeil 2', 38'; Dominey 28' (o.g.); Davey 67'	Stadium: Layer Road; Attendance: 8,155

26 January 1976 24	Southend United	1–3	Hereford United	Southend-on-Sea
	Silvester 63'		McNeil 15', 35'; Layton 83'	Stadium: Roots Hall; Attendance: 3,722

31 January 1976 25	Hereford United	1–1	Crystal Palace	Hereford
	McNeil 55'		Swindlehurst 73'	Stadium: Edgar Street; Attendance: 12,970

4 February 1976 26	Hereford United	4–1	Cardiff City	Hereford
	McNeil 8', 15'; Emery 25'; Layton 80'		Buchanan 76'	Stadium: Edgar Street; Attendance: 12,962

7 February 1976 27	Mansfield Town	2–2	Hereford United	Mansfield
	Bird 48'; Clarke 54'		McNeil 73', 87'	Stadium: Field Mill; Attendance: 5,997

11 February 1976 28	Hereford United	1–0	Mansfield Town	Hereford
	Ritchie 28'			Stadium: Edgar Street; Attendance: 8,302

14 February 1976 29	Grimsby Town	1–0	Hereford United	Cleethorpes
	Lewis 21'			Stadium: Blundell Park; Attendance: 5,944

21 February 1976 30	Hereford United	2–1	Southend United	Hereford
	McNeil 8'; Galley 90'		Silvester 30'	Stadium: Edgar Street; Attendance: 7,264

24 February 1976 31	Swindon Town	0–1	Hereford United	Swindon
			Davey 27'	Stadium: County Ground; Attendance: 10,691

27 February 1976 32	Peterborough United	0–3	Hereford United	Peterborough
			McNeil 18'; Carter 32'; Davey 70'	Stadium: London Road; Attendance: 14,106

10 March 1976 33	Hereford United	5–0	Chester City	Hereford
	McNeil 13', 23' (pen.), 55', 68'; Davey 19'			Stadium: Edgar Street; Attendance: 7,103

13 March 1976 34	Wrexham	2–1	Hereford United	Wrexham
	Sutton 39'; Griffiths 45' (pen.)		McNeil 19'	Stadium: Racecourse Ground; Attendance: 7,621

17 March 1976 35	Hereford United	1–2	Halifax Town	Hereford
	Galley 82'		G. Jones 63'; Overton 90'	Stadium: Edgar Street; Attendance: 7,395

20 March 1976 36	Bury	2–3	Hereford United	Bury
	Williams 67'; Buchan 69'		Davey 30'; Carter 54'; McNeil 87'	Stadium: Gigg Lane; Attendance: 6,384

27 March 1976 37	Hereford United	1–1	Brighton & Hove Albion	Hereford
	McNeil 53'		Ward 1'	Stadium: Edgar Street; Attendance: 12,160

31 March 1976 38	Hereford United	2–1	Aldershot	Hereford
	Richardson 38' (o.g.); Paine 44'		Warnock 50'	Stadium: Edgar Street; Attendance: 7,497

3 April 1976 39	Port Vale	1–1	Hereford United	Stoke-on-Trent
	Griffiths 66'		Davey 54'	Stadium: Vale Park; Attendance: 4,424

6 April 1976 40	Gillingham	3–4	Hereford United	Gillingham
	Durrell 12', 44'; Ritchie 50' (o.g.)		Davey 2', 66'; McNeil 76'; Layton 82'	Stadium: Priestfield; Attendance: 7,914

10 April 1976 41	Hereford United	0–0	Millwall	Hereford
				Stadium: Edgar Street; Attendance: 10,176

14 April 1976 42	Cardiff City	2–0	Hereford United	Cardiff
	Livermore 54'; Campbell 88'			Stadium: Ninian Park; Attendance: 35,549

17 April 1976 43	Walsall	0–0	Hereford United	Walsall
				Stadium: Fellows Park; Attendance: 9,225

19 April 1976 44	Hereford United	3–1	Shrewsbury Town	Hereford
	Carter 46'; Davey 62'; McNeil 69'		Kearney 90'	Stadium: Edgar Street; Attendance: 12,314

24 April 1976 45	Hereford United	3–2	Rotherham United	Hereford
	McNeil 2'; Tyler 6', 38'		Finney 53'; Crawford 67'	Stadium: Edgar Street; Attendance: 8,950

28 April 1976 46	Hereford United	3–1	Preston North End	Hereford
	McNeil 52', 64', 76'		Elwiss 16'	Stadium: Edgar Street; Attendance: 7,592

=== League Cup ===
18 August 1975 First round first leg	Port Vale	4–2	Hereford United	Stoke-on-Trent
	Cullerton 23', 28', 43' (pen.); Bailey 26'		Lindsay 52', 64'	Stadium: Vale Park; Attendance: 3,787

27 August 1975 First round second leg	Hereford United	2–0	Port Vale	Hereford
	Ritchie 61'; Carter 88'			Stadium: Edgar Street; Attendance: 4,107

1 September 1975 First round replay	Hereford United	1–0	Port Vale	Shrewsbury
	Paine 88'			Stadium: Gay Meadow; Attendance: 3,637

10 September 1975 Second round	Hereford United	1–4	Burnley	Hereford
	Carter 50'		Flynn 35', 65'; Noble 48', 78'	Stadium: Edgar Street; Attendance: 11,360

=== Welsh Cup ===
12 November 1975 Third round	Stourbridge	1–2	Hereford United	Stourbridge
	Smith 18'		Walker 45'; Redrobe 50'	Stadium: War Memorial Ground; Attendance: 669

19 January 1976 Fourth round	Newport County	1–2	Hereford United	Newport
	Aizlewood 5'		Aizlewood 18' (o.g.); Layton 41'	Stadium: Somerton Park; Attendance: 2,400

18 February 1976 Fifth round	Hereford United	4–0	Porthmadog	Hereford
	Preece 10'; Silkman 37'; Davey 47', 64'			Stadium: Edgar Street; Attendance: 1,994

23 March 1976 Semi-final	Hereford United	1–1	Shrewsbury Town	Hereford
	Lindsay 31'		Bates 63'	Stadium: Edgar Street; Attendance: 4,748

8 April 1976 Semi-final replay	Shrewsbury Town	1–1 (a.e.t.)	Hereford United	Shrewsbury
	Irvine 63'		Byrne 90'	Stadium: Gay Meadow; Attendance: 2,714
Note: Hereford won 5–4 on penalties

18 May 1976 Final first leg	Hereford United	3–3	Cardiff City	Hereford
	Davey 67'; Paine 69'; McNeil 75'		Evans 25'; Dwyer 62', 87'	Stadium: Edgar Street; Attendance: 3,709
Note: The first leg was originally played at Ninian Park on 29 April 1976 and ended in a 2–2 draw but was declared null and void by the Welsh FA after Peter Spiring, scorer of both Hereford goals, was deemed to have been ineligible to play

19 May 1976 Final second leg	Cardiff City	3–2	Hereford United	Cardiff
	Pethard 11'; Clark 32'; Evans 66'		Lindsay 50'; Byrne 86'	Stadium: Ninian Park; Attendance: 2,648

=== FA Cup ===
22 November 1975 First round	Hereford United	2–0	Torquay United	Hereford
	Carter 7'; Tucker 82'			Stadium: Edgar Street; Attendance: 6,542

13 December 1975 Second round	Bournemouth	2–2	Hereford United	Bournemouth
	Ashworth 38'; Goddard 86'		Tyler 60'; McNeil 71'	Stadium: Dean Court; Attendance: 6,181

17 December 1975 Second round replay	Hereford United	2–0	Bournemouth	Hereford
	Layton 55'; McNeil 58'			Stadium: Edgar Street; Attendance: 6,351

3 January 1976 Third round	York City	2–1	Hereford United	York
	Seal 33'; Hosker 38'		Layton 90'	Stadium: Bootham Crescent; Attendance: 5,154
