= 1976–77 Hereford United F.C. season =

Hereford United
1976–77 season
- Chairman: Frank Miles
- Manager: John Sillett
- Stadium: Edgar Street
- Division Two: 22nd
- League Cup: First round
- FA Cup: Fourth round
- Top goalscorer: League: Dixie McNeil (16); All: Dixie McNeil (18)
- Highest home attendance: 13,891 v Wolverhampton Wanderers, Division Two, 2 October 1976
- Lowest home attendance: 4,448 v Carlisle United, Division Two, 4 May 1977
- Average home league attendance: 7,239
- Biggest win: 3–0 v Burnley (H), Division Two, 4 September 1976
- Biggest defeat: 1–6 v Wolverhampton Wanderers (H), Division Two, 2 October 1976

The 1976–77 season was the 48th season of competitive football played by Hereford United Football Club and their fifth in the Football League. Following promotion as champions of Division Three the previous season, the club competed in Division Two, as well as the League Cup and FA Cup.

== Summary ==
Hereford's rapid progress up the Football League was halted as they became the first team to finish bottom of the Second Division having been promoted as Third Division champions the previous season.

After a promising start which saw only one point dropped in the first three matches, Hereford's form nosedived as it became clear that most other clubs possessed greater strength in depth and players more suited to the demands of Second Division football. This was amply demonstrated by successive matches in the autumn when Hereford were beaten 4–1 at Fulham by a team containing Bobby Moore, Rodney Marsh and George Best, then thrashed 6–1 at home a week later by a Wolverhampton Wanderers side containing Steve Kindon, Kenny Hibbitt, Alan Sunderland and Bobby Gould.

Despite a late rally (four wins and only one defeat from the final nine matches), relegation was confirmed following a goalless draw against Carlisle United with three matches still to play.

== Squad ==
Players who made one appearance or more for Hereford United F.C. during the 1976-77 season

Pos.	Nat.	Name	League		League Cup		FA Cup		Total	
Pos.	Nat.	Name	Apps	Goals	Apps	Goals	Apps	Goals	Apps	Goals
GK	ENG	Kevin Charlton	16	0	2	0	1	0	19	0
GK	SCO	Tommy Hughes	26	0	0	0	1	0	27	0
DF	ENG	Phil Burrows	8	0	1	0	0	0	9	0
DF	IRE	Tony Byrne	8	0	0	0	0	0	8	0
DF	ENG	Steve Emery	19	0	0	0	2	0	21	0
DF	ENG	John Galley	20(3)	2	2	0	0(1)	0	22(4)	2
DF	ENG	Derek Jefferson	26	0	0	0	2	0	28	0
DF	ENG	John Layton	28	4	2	0	2	0	32	4
DF	WAL	Julian Marshall	14	0	0	0	0	0	14	0
DF	ENG	Chris Price	2	0	0	0	0	0	2	0
DF	SCO	Steve Ritchie	32	1	1	0	2	0	35	1
DF	ENG	Billy Tucker	5	0	0	0	0	0	5	0
MF	ENG	Les Briley	33(1)	1	0(1)	0	2	1	35(2)	2
MF	ENG	Roy Carter	18(6)	3	2	0	0	0	20(6)	3
MF	SCO	Jimmy Lindsay	33	4	2	0	2	0	37	4
MF	ENG	Barry Lloyd	12(2)	0	0	0	1	0	13(2)	0
MF	ENG	Terry Paine	26(1)	3	2	0	2	0	30(1)	3
MF	WAL	Alan Peters	1	0	0	0	0	0	1	0
MF	ENG	Brian Preece	3(1)	0	0	0	0	0	3(1)	0
MF	IRE	Kevin Sheedy	13(3)	1	0	0	0	0	13(3)	1
MF	ENG	Peter Spiring	32(6)	9	2	1	2	0	36(6)	10
MF	ENG	Dudley Tyler	4(2)	0	0(1)	1	0	0	4(3)	1
MF	WAL	Shane Walker	5	0	2	0	0	0	7	0
FW	SCO	Jimmy Coughlin (on loan from Albion Rovers)	1(1)	1	0	0	0	0	1(1)	1
FW	WAL	Steve Crompton	1	0	0	0	0	0	1	0
FW	ENG	Steve Davey	31	9	2	0	2	0	35	9
FW	ENG	Gary Goodchild	1(3)	0	0	0	1	0	2(3)	0
FW	ENG	Dixie McNeil	37	16	2	2	0	0	39	18
FW	SCO	Colin Sinclair	7(2)	0	0	0	0	0	7(2)	0

== League table ==
Pos	Team	Pld	W	D	L	GF	GA	GD	Pts	Qualification or relegation
18	Cardiff City	42	12	10	20	56	67	−11	34	Qualification for the Cup Winners' Cup first round
19	Orient	42	9	16	17	37	55	−18	34	
20	Carlisle United (R)	42	11	12	19	49	75	−26	34	Relegation to the Third Division
21	Plymouth Argyle (R)	42	8	16	18	46	65	−19	32	Relegation to the Third Division
22	Hereford United (R)	42	8	15	19	57	78	−21	31	Relegation to the Third Division

Rules for classification: 1) Points; 2) Goal difference; 3) Goals scored
(R) Relegated

== Results ==
=== Second Division ===
21 August 1976 1	Hereford United	1–0	Hull City	Hereford
	McNeil 54'			Stadium: Edgar Street; Attendance: 7,323

28 August 1976 2	Sheffield United	1–1	Hereford United	Sheffield
	Guthrie 1'		Carter 70'	Stadium: Bramall Lane; Attendance: 15,087

4 September 1976 3	Hereford United	3–0	Burnley	Hereford
	McNeil 42', 72', 90'			Stadium: Edgar Street; Attendance: 9,543

11 September 1976 4	Nottingham Forest	4–3	Hereford United	Nottingham
	Butlin 32'; Bowyer 39', 71'; Robertson 61'		McNeil 11', 72'; Spiring 17'	Stadium: City Ground; Attendance: 12,081

14 September 1976 5	Carlisle United	2–2	Hereford United	Carlisle
	Martin 5' (pen.); Rafferty 71'		Spiring 17'; Layton 28'	Stadium: Brunton Park; Attendance: 7,371

18 September 1976 6	Hereford United	1–2	Charlton Athletic	Hereford
	Lindsay 72'		Flanagan 37'; Hales 56'	Stadium: Edgar Street; Attendance: 8,723

25 September 1976 7	Fulham	4–1	Hereford United	London
	Slough 20'; Evanson 26'; Marsh 69', 72'		Howe 35' (o.g.)	Stadium: Craven Cottage; Attendance: 18,935

2 October 1976 8	Hereford United	1–6	Wolverhampton Wanderers	Hereford
	McNeil 53' (pen.)		Sunderland 6'; Kindon 28'; Gould 42', 67'; Carr 61'; Daley 83'	Stadium: Edgar Street; Attendance: 13,891

9 October 1976 9	Luton Town	2–0	Hereford United	Luton
	Husband 54'; P. Futcher 88'			Stadium: Kenilworth Road; Attendance: 9,395

16 October 1976 10	Southampton	1–0	Hereford United	Southampton
	Holmes 45'			Stadium: The Dell; Attendance: 24,910

23 October 1976 11	Hereford United	1–4	Notts County	Hereford
	Spiring 37'		Sims 28', 80'; Needham 65'; Busby 77'	Stadium: Edgar Street; Attendance: 7,462

30 October 1976 12	Millwall	4–2	Hereford United	London
	Brisley 30'; Seasman 59'; Lee 75'; Shanahan 84' (pen.)		Davey 19'; Spiring 88'	Stadium: The Den; Attendance: 8,685

6 November 1976 13	Hereford United	2–2	Chelsea	Hereford
	Ritchie 29'; Layton 70'		Finnieston 28', 41' (pen.)	Stadium: Edgar Street; Attendance: 12,528

13 November 1976 14	Bristol Rovers	2–3	Hereford United	Bristol
	Warboys 8'; Bannister 15'		Spiring 13'; Davey 20', 26'	Stadium: Eastville; Attendance: 8,485

20 November 1976 15	Hereford United	0–0	Oldham Athletic	Hereford
				Stadium: Edgar Street; Attendance: 7,997

27 November 1976 16	Blackburn Rovers	1–0	Hereford United	Blackburn
	Wagstaffe 4'			Stadium: Ewood Park; Attendance: 9,090

15 December 1976 17	Hereford United	3–3	Bolton Wanderers	Hereford
	Davey 5', 18'; McNeil 80'		Whatmore 65'; Allardyce 82'; Greaves 87'	Stadium: Edgar Street; Attendance: 5,052

18 December 1976 18	Hereford United	2–3	Orient	Hereford
	Lindsay 37'; Galley 83'		Whittle 20', 72'; Bennett 85'	Stadium: Edgar Street; Attendance: 5,640

27 December 1976 19	Cardiff City	3–1	Hereford United	Cardiff
	Giles 35'; Evans 64', 80'		Paine 83'	Stadium: Ninian Park; Attendance: 14,465

1 January 1977 20	Chelsea	5–1	Hereford United	London
	Swain 4'; Stanley 25'; R. Wilkins 39', 90'; Finnieston 46'		Paine 61'	Stadium: Stamford Bridge; Attendance: 27,720

22 January 1977 21	Hull City	1–1	Hereford United	Hull
	Sunley 10'		Davey 21'	Stadium: Boothferry Park; Attendance: 7,819

9 February 1977 22	Hereford United	1–1	Plymouth Argyle	Hereford
	Layton 15'		Hall 41'	Stadium: Edgar Street; Attendance: 5,002

12 February 1977 23	Burnley	1–1	Hereford United	Burnley
	Noble 54'		Newton 30' (o.g.)	Stadium: Turf Moor; Attendance: 8,467

14 February 1977 24	Blackpool	2–1	Hereford United	Blackpool
	Walsh 75', 88'		Galley 89'	Stadium: Bloomfield Road; Attendance: 8,535

25 February 1977 25	Charlton Athletic	1–1	Hereford United	London
	McAuley 78'		Spiring 56'	Stadium: The Valley; Attendance: 8,704

2 March 1977 26	Hereford United	0–1	Nottingham Forest	Hereford
			Curran 38'	Stadium: Edgar Street; Attendance: 7,503

5 March 1977 27	Hereford United	1–0	Fulham	Hereford
	McNeil 55'			Stadium: Edgar Street; Attendance: 6,590

12 March 1977 28	Wolverhampton Wanderers	2–1	Hereford United	Wolverhampton
	Todd 39'; Hibbitt 49'		Briley 77'	Stadium: Molineux; Attendance: 22,992

19 March 1977 29	Hereford United	0–1	Luton Town	Hereford
			R. Futcher 89'	Stadium: Edgar Street; Attendance: 6,737

23 March 1977 30	Hereford United	2–2	Sheffield United	Hereford
	Davey 28'; Carter 34'		Edwards 31', 81'	Stadium: Edgar Street; Attendance: 5,504

1 April 1977 31	Notts County	3–2	Hereford United	Nottingham
	Bradd 36', 69'; Scanlon 46'		Davey 76'; Coughlin 90'	Stadium: Meadow Lane; Attendance: 8,080

6 April 1977 32	Hereford United	2–2	Cardiff City	Hereford
	Layton 34'; Spiring 67'		Sayer 74', 85'	Stadium: Edgar Street; Attendance: 7,672

9 April 1977 33	Plymouth Argyle	2–1	Hereford United	Plymouth
	Bannister 2', 69'		Davey 22'	Stadium: Home Park; Attendance: 9,787

11 April 1977 34	Hereford United	1–1	Bristol Rovers	Hereford
	Paine 13'		Powell 73'	Stadium: Edgar Street; Attendance: 7,195

16 April 1977 35	Oldham Athletic	3–5	Hereford United	Oldham
	Whittle 7'; Shaw 28'; Robins 66'		McNeil 31', 90'; Spiring 34', 53'; Hicks 62' (o.g.)	Stadium: Boundary Park; Attendance: 7,733

20 April 1977 36	Hereford United	3–1	Millwall	Hereford
	McNeil 30', 52'; Sheedy 35'		Alexander 83'	Stadium: Edgar Street; Attendance: 4,837

23 April 1977 37	Hereford United	1–0	Blackburn Rovers	Hereford
	McNeil 15'			Stadium: Edgar Street; Attendance: 5,853

30 April 1977 38	Bolton Wanderers	3–1	Hereford United	Bolton
	Hughes 35' (o.g.); Allardyce 78'; Taylor 90'		Carter 85'	Stadium: Burnden Park; Attendance: 18,874

4 May 1977 39	Hereford United	0–0	Carlisle United	Hereford
				Stadium: Edgar Street; Attendance: 4,448

7 May 1977 40	Hereford United	1–1	Blackpool	Hereford
	McNeil 75'		Finnigan 40'	Stadium: Edgar Street; Attendance: 5,312

11 May 1977 41	Hereford United	2–0	Southampton	Hereford
	Lindsay 13'; McNeil 29'			Stadium: Edgar Street; Attendance: 6,886

14 May 1977 42	Orient	1–1	Hereford United	London
	Roffey 40'		Lindsay 90'	Stadium: Brisbane Road; Attendance: 4,956

=== League Cup ===
14 August 1976 First round first leg	Chester	2–0	Hereford United	Chester
	Crossley 37' (pen.); Draper 79'			Stadium: Sealand Road; Attendance: 3,866

18 August 1976 First round second leg	Hereford United	4–3	Chester	Hereford
	McNeil 15', 77'; Spiring 39'; Tyler 89'		Draper 6'; Crossley 22'; Paine 53' (o.g.)	Stadium: Edgar Street; Attendance: 5,028

=== FA Cup ===
8 January 1977 Third round	Hereford United	1–0	Reading	Hereford
	Briley 57'			Stadium: Edgar Street; Attendance: 7,401

29 January 1977 Fourth round	Middlesbrough	4–0	Hereford United	Middlesbrough
	Souness 31'; Armstrong 51', 72' (pen.); Willey 89'			Stadium: Ayresome Park; Attendance: 25,000
