= 1974–75 Hereford United F.C. season =

Hereford United
1974–75 season
- Chairman: Frank Miles
- Manager: John Sillett
- Stadium: Edgar Street
- Division Three: 12th
- League Cup: Third round
- FA Cup: Second round
- Welsh Cup: Fourth round
- Top goalscorer: League: Dixie McNeil (31); All: Dixie McNeil (32)
- Highest home attendance: 11,488 v Preston North End, Division Three, 5 October 1974
- Lowest home attendance: 2,114 v Barry Town, Welsh Cup, 13 November 1974
- Average home league attendance: 7,230
- Biggest win: 5–0 v Chesterfield (H), Division Three, 28 September 1974
- Biggest defeat: 1–6 v Tranmere Rovers (A), Division Three, 29 November 1974

The 1974–75 season was the 46th season of competitive football played by Hereford United Football Club and their third in the Football League. The club competed in Division Three, as well as the League Cup, Welsh Cup and FA Cup.

== Summary ==
Hereford began the season with a new manager at the helm, Colin Addison having left the club by mutual consent to be replaced by Bristol City coach John Sillett. A number of new signings also arrived, including former England international Terry Paine from Southampton as player-coach, and forward Dixie McNeil from Lincoln City.

Results showed an overall improvement on the previous season as Hereford finished comfortably in mid-table, with McNeil bagging 31 league goals, making him top scorer across all four divisions. He became the first Hereford player to score a league hat-trick in a 5–0 win over Chesterfield and followed up with another in a 6–3 win over eventual champions Blackburn Rovers.

== Squad ==
Players who made one appearance or more for Hereford United F.C. during the 1974-75 season

Pos.	Nat.	Name	League		League Cup		FA Cup		Welsh Cup		Total	
Pos.	Nat.	Name	Apps	Goals	Apps	Goals	Apps	Goals	Apps	Goals	Apps	Goals
GK	SCO	Jim Blyth (on loan from Coventry City)	7	0	0	0	0	0	0	0	7	0
GK	SCO	Tommy Hughes	39	0	4	0	2	0	2	0	47	0
DF	IRE	Tony Byrne	45	0	4	0	2	0	2	0	53	0
DF	ENG	Steve Emery	44	0	4	0	2	0	2	1	52	1
DF	ENG	John Layton	19	1	3	0	1	0	1	0	24	1
DF	WAL	Mick McLaughlin	9	0	0	0	0	0	0	0	9	0
DF	WAL	Peter Morgan	16	0	4	0	0	0	1	0	21	0
DF	ENG	Tommy Naylor	2	0	0	0	0	0	0	0	2	0
DF	ENG	Brian Roberts (on loan from Coventry City)	5	0	0	0	0	0	0	0	5	0
DF	ENG	David Rylands	20	0	0	0	2	0	1	0	23	0
DF	ENG	Billy Tucker	35	1	1	0	1(1)	1	2	0	39(1)	2
MF	ENG	Roy Carter	1	0	0	0	0	0	0	0	1	0
MF	WAL	Brian Evans	14(3)	1	3	1	1	0	1(1)	0	19(4)	2
MF	ENG	Viv Fear	2(1)	0	1	0	0	0	0	0	3(1)	0
MF	ENG	Harry Gregory	11(2)	1	0	0	0	0	0(1)	0	11(3)	1
MF	ENG	Bobby Kellard (on loan from Portsmouth)	3	1	0	0	0	0	0	0	3	1
MF	ENG	Fred Kemp	12(1)	2	2	0	1	0	2	0	17(1)	2
MF	ENG	Colin Lee (on loan from Bristol City)	7(2)	0	0	0	2	0	0	0	9(2)	0
MF	ENG	Terry Paine	40	4	4	1	2	0	1	0	47	5
MF	ENG	Brian Preece	2	0	0	0	0	0	0	0	2	0
MF	ENG	David Rudge	16	2	3	0	0	0	0	0	19	2
MF	ENG	Barry Silkman	6(9)	1	0	0	0	0	0	0	6(9)	1
MF	ENG	Dudley Tyler	38(3)	3	3	0	2	0	2	0	45(3)	3
MF	WAL	Shane Walker	3	0	0	0	0	0	0	0	3	0
FW	WAL	Nick Deacy	13(4)	2	0	0	0	0	1	0	14(4)	2
FW	ENG	John Galley	22	6	0	0	0	0	1	0	23	6
FW	ENG	Dixie McNeil	44	31	4	1	2	0	1	0	51	32
FW	ENG	Paul Lee	9(3)	3	0(1)	0	2	0	1	0	12(4)	3
FW	ENG	Eric Redrobe	13(2)	3	1(1)	0	0	0	1	0	15(3)	3
FW	ENG	John Ritchie	9(2)	1	3	1	0	0	0	0	12(2)	2

== League table ==
Pos	Team	Pld	W	D	L	GF	GA	GAv	Pts	Qualification or relegation
10	Gillingham	46	17	14	15	65	60	1.083	48	
11	Colchester United	46	17	13	16	70	63	1.111	47	
12	Hereford United	46	16	14	16	64	66	0.970	46	
13	Wrexham	46	15	15	16	65	55	1.182	45	Qualification for the Cup Winners' Cup first round
14	Bury	46	16	12	18	53	50	1.060	44	

Rules for classification: 1) Points; 2) Goal average; 3) Goals scored

== Results ==
=== Third Division ===
17 August 1974 1	Hereford United	2–0	Aldershot	Hereford
	McNeil 43'; Kemp 56'			Stadium: Edgar Street; Attendance: 7,885

24 August 1974 2	Charlton Athletic	2–0	Hereford United	London
	Curtis 60' (pen.); Bowman 69'			Stadium: The Valley (stadium); Attendance: 6,387

31 August 1974 3	Hereford United	2–0	Peterborough United	Hereford
	McNeil 11', 50'			Stadium: Edgar Street; Attendance: 7,315

4 September 1974 4	Hereford United	0–1	Watford	Hereford
			Jenkins 76'	Stadium: Edgar Street; Attendance: 7,357

7 September 1974 5	Walsall	3–1	Hereford United	Walsall
	Buckley 20', 34'; Atthey 84'		Ritchie 74'	Stadium: Fellows Park; Attendance: 3,328

14 September 1974 6	Hereford United	0–1	Bournemouth	Hereford
			Howard 87'	Stadium: Edgar Street; Attendance: 7,357

18 September 1974 7	Hereford United	2–0	Crystal Palace	Hereford
	McNeil 23' (pen.); Rudge 32'			Stadium: Edgar Street; Attendance: 8,488

21 September 1974 8	Port Vale	3–0	Hereford United	Stoke-on-Trent
	Williams 66'; Horton 71'; Bailey 85'			Stadium: Vale Park; Attendance: 3,433

24 September 1974 9	Plymouth Argyle	1–0	Hereford United	Plymouth
	Mariner 12'			Stadium: Home Park; Attendance: 5,519

28 September 1974 10	Hereford United	5–0	Chesterfield	Hereford
	McNeil 16', 32' (pen.), 80' (pen.); Evans 70'; Paine 73'			Stadium: Edgar Street; Attendance: 5,961

2 October 1974 11	Watford	1–1	Hereford United	Watford
	Scullion 33' (pen.)		McNeil 75'	Stadium: Vicarage Road; Attendance: 5,572

5 October 1974 12	Hereford United	2–2	Preston North End	Hereford
	Rudge 14'; P. Lee 83'		Holden 74'; Bird 89'	Stadium: Edgar Street; Attendance: 11,488

12 October 1974 13	Gillingham	2–3	Hereford United	Gillingham
	Jacks 2'; Feely 60'		Redrobe 43'; Paine 59'; McNeil 81'	Stadium: Priestfield; Attendance: 5,457

19 October 1974 14	Hereford United	0–0	Halifax Town	Hereford
				Stadium: Edgar Street; Attendance: 6,833

23 October 1974 15	Hereford United	3–1	Colchester United	Hereford
	McNeil 7'; Redrobe 30'; P. Lee 74'		Thomas 83'	Stadium: Edgar Street; Attendance: 6,390

25 October 1974 16	Southend United	0–0	Hereford United	Southend-on-Sea
				Stadium: Roots Hall; Attendance: 5,572

2 November 1974 17	Hereford United	1–1	Huddersfield Town	Hereford
	McNeil 7'		Gowling 70'	Stadium: Edgar Street; Attendance: 7,474

6 November 1974 18	Colchester United	1–2	Hereford United	Colchester
	Svarc 69'		McNeil 41'; Tyler 49'	Stadium: Layer Road; Attendance: 5,135

9 November 1974 19	Wrexham	2–1	Hereford United	Wrexham
	Davies 19'; Smallman 43'		McNeil 70'	Stadium: Racecourse Ground; Attendance: 6,157

16 November 1974 20	Hereford United	2–0	Brighton & Hove Albion	Hereford
	McNeil 17'; P. Lee 47'			Stadium: Edgar Street; Attendance: 7,016

29 November 1974 21	Tranmere Rovers	6–1	Hereford United	Birkenhead
	Veitch 30'; Crossley 33' (pen.), 59' (pen.); Coppell 55'; Tynan 68'; Flood 78'		Tyler 24'	Stadium: Prenton Park; Attendance: 2,560

7 December 1974 22	Hereford United	2–1	Swindon Town	Hereford
	McNeil 27'; Redrobe 50'		Eastoe 43'	Stadium: Edgar Street; Attendance: 8,625

21 December 1974 23	Hereford United	6–3	Blackburn Rovers	Hereford
	McNeil 23', 48' (pen.), 73'; Kemp 28'; Galley 76'; Tyler 85'		Burgin 47'; Waddington 80' (pen.); Beamish 82'	Stadium: Edgar Street; Attendance: 7,288

26 December 1974 24	Bournemouth	2–1	Hereford United	Bournemouth
	O'Rourke 42'; Buttle 72'		Parodi 18' (o.g.)	Stadium: Dean Court; Attendance: 5,803

28 December 1974 25	Hereford United	1–1	Bury	Hereford
	McNeil 10' (pen.)		Spence 72'	Stadium: Edgar Street; Attendance: 8,170

4 January 1975 26	Crystal Palace	2–2	Hereford United	London
	Taylor 10'; Chatterton 77'		Galley 72'; Layton 82'	Stadium: Selhurst Park; Attendance: 16,893

11 January 1975 27	Swindon Town	1–0	Hereford United	Swindon
	Butler 54'			Stadium: County Ground; Attendance: 11,781

18 January 1975 28	Hereford United	2–0	Tranmere Rovers	Hereford
	Kellard 15'; Galley 50'			Stadium: Edgar Street; Attendance: 6,591

1 February 1975 29	Hereford United	1–0	Wrexham	Hereford
	McNeil 2'			Stadium: Edgar Street; Attendance: 6,715

8 February 1975 30	Huddersfield Town	2–1	Hereford United	Huddersfield
	Fowler 25'; Lawson 78'		McNeil 28'	Stadium: Leeds Road; Attendance: 4,893

15 February 1975 31	Hereford United	3–2	Grimsby Town	Hereford
	McNeil 19' (pen.), 90'; Deacy 82'		Lewis 36', 45'	Stadium: Edgar Street; Attendance: 5,445

22 February 1975 32	Brighton & Hove Albion	2–1	Hereford United	Hove
	Piper 8'; Towner 71'		Galley 14'	Stadium: Goldstone Ground; Attendance: 11,541

1 March 1975 33	Peterborough United	1–1	Hereford United	Peterborough
	Lee 68' (pen.)		Galley 18'	Stadium: London Road; Attendance: 7,108

4 March 1975 34	Grimsby Town	0–0	Hereford United	Cleethorpes
				Stadium: Blundell Park; Attendance: 5,008

8 March 1975 35	Hereford United	1–5	Plymouth Argyle	Hereford
	McNeil 70'		Hardcastle 21'; Mariner 50'; Rafferty 85', 90'; Vassallo 90'	Stadium: Edgar Street; Attendance: 9,296

15 March 1975 36	Chesterfield	4–1	Hereford United	Chesterfield
	Moss 2'; Darling 8'; Shanahan 29' (pen.), 51' (pen.)		McNeil 77'	Stadium: Saltergate; Attendance: 3,826

19 March 1975 37	Aldershot	2–2	Hereford United	Aldershot
	Morrissey 51', 81'		McNeil 18' (pen.); Deacy 73'	Stadium: Recreation Ground; Attendance: 2,698

22 March 1975 38	Hereford United	2–0	Walsall	Hereford
	McNeil 63' (pen.); Silkman 79'			Stadium: Edgar Street; Attendance: 6,848

28 March 1975 39	Bury	3–0	Hereford United	Bury
	Galley 28' (o.g.); Buchan 33'; Rowland 72'			Stadium: Gigg Lane; Attendance: 4,330

29 March 1975 40	Blackburn Rovers	1–0	Hereford United	Blackburn
	Hickman 24'			Stadium: Ewood Park; Attendance: 13,001

31 March 1975 41	Hereford United	1–0	Port Vale	Hereford
	Gregory 90'			Stadium: Edgar Street; Attendance: 6,976

5 April 1975 42	Hereford United	1–0	Southend United	Hereford
	Galley 24'			Stadium: Edgar Street; Attendance: 4,807

12 April 1975 43	Preston North End	2–2	Hereford United	Preston
	Burns 14'; Morley 44' (pen.)		McNeil 24', 80' (pen.)	Stadium: Deepdale; Attendance: 6,528

19 April 1975 44	Hereford United	1–1	Gillingham	Hereford
	McNeil 51'		Richardson 70' (pen.)	Stadium: Edgar Street; Attendance: 5,643

23 April 1975 45	Hereford United	2–2	Charlton Athletic	Hereford
	Paine 35'; McNeil 60' (pen.)		Dunphy 7'; Flanagan 50'	Stadium: Edgar Street; Attendance: 6,453

26 April 1975 46	Halifax Town	2–2	Hereford United	Halifax
	McHale 25' (pen.); Harrold 73'		Paine 21' (pen.); Tucker 43'	Stadium: The Shay; Attendance: 6,528

=== League Cup ===
21 August 1974 First round	Hereford United	1–1	Shrewsbury Town	Hereford
	McNeil 64'		Durban 78'	Stadium: Edgar Street; Attendance: 7,263

27 August 1974 First round replay	Shrewsbury Town	0–1	Hereford United	Shrewsbury
			Paine 34'	Stadium: Gay Meadow; Attendance: 5,183

11 September 1974 Second round	Exeter City	0–1	Hereford United	Exeter
			Ritchie 80'	Stadium: St James Park; Attendance: 3,608

8 October 1974 Third round	Ipswich Town	4–1	Hereford United	Ipswich
	Johnson 2'; Talbot 15'; Hunter 40'; Whymark 54'		Evans 56'	Stadium: Portman Road; Attendance: 16,284

=== Welsh Cup ===
13 November 1974 Third round	Hereford United	1–0	Barry Town	Hereford
	Emery 7' (pen.)			Stadium: Edgar Street; Attendance: 2,114

14 January 1975 Fourth round	Cardiff City	2–0	Hereford United	Cardiff
	Reece 63'; Showers 81'			Stadium: Ninian Park; Attendance: 3,515

=== FA Cup ===
26 November 1974 First round	Hereford United	1–0	Gillingham	Hereford
	Tucker 39'			Stadium: Edgar Street; Attendance: 7,362

14 December 1974 Second round	Cambridge United	2–0	Hereford United	Cambridge
	Watson 39', 74'			Stadium: Abbey Stadium; Attendance: 3,850
