= 1977–78 Hereford United F.C. season =

Hereford United
1977–78 season
- Chairman: Frank Miles (until December 1977); Peter Hill
- Manager: John Sillett (until February 1978); Tony Ford (caretaker)
- Stadium: Edgar Street
- Division Three: 23rd
- League Cup: First round
- FA Cup: First round
- Top goalscorer: League: Steve Crompton and Steve Davey (5); All: Steve Davey (7)
- Highest home attendance: 10,183 v Wrexham, Division Three, 29 April 1978
- Lowest home attendance: 3,334 v Bournemouth, League Cup, 23 August 1977
- Average home league attendance: 4,813
- Biggest win: 4–0 v Exeter City (H), Division Three, 25 March 1978
- Biggest defeat: 0–4 v Gillingham (A), Division Three, 7 January 1978

The 1977–78 season was the 49th season of competitive football played by Hereford United Football Club and their sixth in the Football League. Following relegation from Division Two the previous season, the club competed in Division Three, as well as the League Cup and FA Cup.

== Summary ==
Hereford endured a torrid season which saw the resignations of chairman Frank Miles and manager John Sillett, the transfer of prolific striker Dixie McNeil to Wrexham and, ultimately, a second successive relegation. They never fully recovered from five defeats in their opening six matches, although a nine-match unbeaten run (including seven clean sheets) initially steered them towards mid-table. Following a run of only one win in 19 matches, four wins from six in March under caretaker manager Tony Ford briefly raised survival hopes, but Hereford went down with a whimper after three draws and seven defeats in their final 10 matches.

Goals were severely rationed, with McNeil's three in seven league matches prior to his departure keeping him as leading scorer until the end of January. Away form was particularly dismal with no wins and just six league goals scored on their travels all season.

In both domestic cup competitions, Hereford fell at the first hurdle, including the indignity of their first FA Cup defeat by a non-league club since election to the Football League when Wealdstone beat them 3–2 in a replay at Edgar Street.

== Squad ==
Players who made one appearance or more for Hereford United F.C. during the 1977-78 season

Pos.	Nat.	Name	League		League Cup		FA Cup		Total	
Pos.	Nat.	Name	Apps	Goals	Apps	Goals	Apps	Goals	Apps	Goals
GK	ENG	Kevin Charlton	1	0	0	0	0	0	1	0
GK	SCO	Tommy Hughes	13	0	3	0	0	0	16	0
GK	ENG	Peter Mellor	32	0	0	0	2	0	34	0
DF	ENG	Bryan Bouston	4(2)	0	0	0	0	0	4(2)	0
DF	ENG	Phil Burrows	26	0	3	0	2	0	31	0
DF	WAL	Stuart Cornes	13	0	0	0	0	0	13	0
DF	ENG	Steve Emery	39	2	3	0	2	0	44	2
DF	ENG	Derek Jefferson	13	0	0	0	0	0	13	0
DF	ENG	John Layton	42	1	3	0	2	0	47	1
DF	WAL	Julian Marshall	40(1)	3	3	0	2	0	45(1)	3
DF	ENG	Chris Price	13	0	0	0	0	0	13	0
DF	SCO	Steve Ritchie	24	1	1(1)	0	0	0	25(1)	1
MF	ENG	Frank Barton	18	2	0	0	0	0	18	2
MF	ENG	Les Briley	27	1	3	0	0	0	30	1
MF	ENG	Roy Carter	12(1)	1	3	1	2	0	17(1)	2
MF	WAL	Kyle Holmes	4	0	0	0	0	0	4	0
MF	ENG	Andy Proudlove	6(5)	0	0	0	0(1)	0	6(6)	0
MF	IRE	Kevin Sheedy	33(1)	3	2(1)	0	2	1	37(2)	4
MF	ENG	Peter Spiring	30(4)	2	3	2	2	0	35(4)	4
MF	ENG	Kenny Stephens	26	1	0	0	1	0	27	1
FW	WAL	Steve Crompton	23(2)	5	0	0	0	0	23(2)	5
FW	ENG	Steve Davey	31	5	3	1	2	1	36	7
FW	ENG	Keith Fear (on loan from Bristol City)	6	0	0	0	0	0	6	0
FW	ENG	Billy Holmes	9(6)	2	0	0	2	0	11(6)	2
FW	ENG	Dixie McNeil	7	3	3	1	0	0	10	4
FW	ENG	Stewart Phillips	1	0	0	0	0	0	1	0
FW	ENG	Eric Redrobe	0(1)	0	0	0	0	0	0(1)	0
FW	SCO	Colin Sinclair	13	2	0	0	0	0	13	2

== League table ==
Pos	Team	Pld	W	D	L	GF	GA	GD	Pts	Promotion or relegation
20	Rotherham United	46	13	13	20	51	68	−17	39	
21	Port Vale (R)	46	8	20	18	46	67	−21	36	Relegation to the Fourth Division
22	Bradford City (R)	46	12	10	24	56	86	−30	34	Relegation to the Fourth Division
23	Hereford United (R)	46	9	14	23	34	60	−26	32	Relegation to the Fourth Division
24	Portsmouth (R)	46	7	17	22	41	75	−34	31	Relegation to the Fourth Division

Source: rsssf.com
(R) Relegated

== Results ==
=== Third Division ===
20 August 1977 1	Chester	4–1	Hereford United	Chester
	Kearney 13', 59' (pen.); I. Edwards 18'; Mason 70'		McNeil 34'	Stadium: Sealand Road; Attendance: 3,276

27 August 1977 2	Hereford United	0–1	Tranmere Rovers	Hereford
			Allen 22'	Stadium: Edgar Street; Attendance: 4,062

3 September 1977 3	Plymouth Argyle	2–0	Hereford United	Plymouth
	Trusson 57'; Rogers 84'			Stadium: Home Park; Attendance: 5,732

7 September 1977 4	Hereford United	2–0	Gillingham	Hereford
	Sinclair 38'; Spiring 65'			Stadium: Edgar Street; Attendance: 3,441

10 September 1977 5	Hereford United	2–3	Rotherham United	Hereford
	Briley 67'; McNeil 89'		Womble 36'; Rhodes 84'; Crawford 86'	Stadium: Edgar Street; Attendance: 4,393

14 September 1977 6	Chesterfield	2–1	Hereford United	Chesterfield
	Cammack 4'; Parker 42'		McNeil 54'	Stadium: Saltergate; Attendance: 4,368

17 September 1977 7	Preston North End	0–0	Hereford United	Preston
				Stadium: Deepdale; Attendance: 5,447

24 September 1977 8	Hereford United	1–0	Carlisle United	Hereford
	Sheedy 19'			Stadium: Edgar Street; Attendance: 3,750

28 September 1977 9	Lincoln City	0–0	Hereford United	Lincoln
				Stadium: Sincil Bank; Attendance: 4,973

1 October 1977 10	Hereford United	2–1	Oxford United	Hereford
	Sinclair 32'; Marshall 89'		Duncan 52'	Stadium: Edgar Street; Attendance: 5,218

5 October 1977 11	Hereford United	1–0	Bury	Hereford
	Ritchie 63'			Stadium: Edgar Street; Attendance: 4,902

8 October 1977 12	Colchester United	0–0	Hereford United	Colchester
				Stadium: Layer Road; Attendance: 4,584

15 October 1977 13	Hereford United	0–0	Cambridge United	Hereford
				Stadium: Edgar Street; Attendance: 5,181

22 October 1977 14	Bradford City	0–0	Hereford United	Bradford
				Stadium: Valley Parade; Attendance: 4,645

29 October 1977 15	Hereford United	1–1	Port Vale	Hereford
	Carter 7'		Sutcliffe 33'	Stadium: Edgar Street; Attendance: 3,502

5 November 1977 16	Shrewsbury Town	3–0	Hereford United	Shrewsbury
	Irvine 4', 20', 75' (pen.)			Stadium: Gay Meadow; Attendance: 6,116

12 November 1977 17	Hereford United	3–2	Walsall	Hereford
	Marshall 37'; Emery 41'; W. Holmes 52'		Birch 13'; Buckley 66' (pen.)	Stadium: Edgar Street; Attendance: 5,655

19 November 1977 18	Portsmouth	2–0	Hereford United	Portsmouth
	Kemp 72'; Pollock 87'			Stadium: Fratton Park; Attendance: 8,077

3 December 1977 19	Hereford United	1–1	Swindon Town	Hereford
	W. Holmes 62'		McHale 78' (pen.)	Stadium: Edgar Street; Attendance: 4,541

10 December 1977 20	Wrexham	2–1	Hereford United	Wrexham
	Whittle 7'; Cartwright 44'		Sheedy 76'	Stadium: Racecourse Ground; Attendance: 8,813

26 December 1977 21	Hereford United	0–0	Peterborough United	Hereford
				Stadium: Edgar Street; Attendance: 5,625

27 December 1977 22	Exeter City	1–0	Hereford United	Exeter
	Bowker 68'			Stadium: St James Park; Attendance: 6,722

31 December 1977 23	Sheffield Wednesday	1–0	Hereford United	Sheffield
	Wylde 73'			Stadium: Hillsborough; Attendance: 11,029

2 January 1978 24	Hereford United	1–1	Shrewsbury Town	Hereford
	Davey 68'		Biggins 44'	Stadium: Edgar Street; Attendance: 6,392

7 January 1978 25	Gillingham	4–0	Hereford United	Gillingham
	Price 1', 45'; Richardson 56'; Nicholl 90'			Stadium: Priestfield; Attendance: 6,765

14 January 1978 26	Hereford United	2–2	Chester	Hereford
	Emery 32'; Davey 59'		I. Edwards 43'; Jones 69'	Stadium: Edgar Street; Attendance: 4,216

20 January 1978 27	Tranmere Rovers	2–1	Hereford United	Birkenhead
	Palios 21'; Moore 86'		Davey 79'	Stadium: Prenton Park; Attendance: 4,481

28 January 1978 28	Hereford United	1–3	Plymouth Argyle	Hereford
	Davey 9'		Austin 7'; Craven 40'; Megson 74'	Stadium: Edgar Street; Attendance: 4,737

11 February 1978 29	Hereford United	0–0	Preston North End	Hereford
				Stadium: Edgar Street; Attendance: 4,791

25 February 1978 30	Oxford United	3–0	Hereford United	Oxford
	Seacole 7'; Foley 71'; Curran 77'			Stadium: Manor Ground; Attendance: 3,793

4 March 1978 31	Hereford United	1–0	Colchester United	Hereford
	Barton 44' (pen.)			Stadium: Edgar Street; Attendance: 3,831

8 March 1978 32	Hereford United	2–1	Chesterfield	Hereford
	Crompton 52'; Spiring 57'		Fern 77'	Stadium: Edgar Street; Attendance: 4,602

11 March 1978 33	Cambridge United	2–0	Hereford United	Cambridge
	Finney 31'; Watson 60'			Stadium: Abbey Stadium; Attendance: 6,252

18 March 1978 34	Hereford United	2–1	Bradford City	Hereford
	Layton 6'; Crompton 52'		McNiven 74'	Stadium: Edgar Street; Attendance: 4,024

22 March 1978 35	Port Vale	1–0	Hereford United	Stoke-on-Trent
	Froggatt 10'			Stadium: Vale Park; Attendance: 3,220

25 March 1978 36	Hereford United	4–0	Exeter City	Hereford
	Stephens 1'; Crompton 12', 51'; Davey 27'			Stadium: Edgar Street; Attendance: 4,436

28 March 1978 37	Peterborough United	2–1	Hereford United	Peterborough
	Butlin 44', 73'		Sheedy 35'	Stadium: London Road; Attendance: 5,036

1 April 1978 38	Hereford United	0–1	Sheffield Wednesday	Hereford
			Wylde 78'	Stadium: Edgar Street; Attendance: 5,358

5 April 1978 39	Hereford United	1–1	Lincoln City	Hereford
	Marshall 86'		Wigginton 15'	Stadium: Edgar Street; Attendance: 3,974

8 April 1978 40	Walsall	2–0	Hereford United	Walsall
	Austin 1'; Bates 80'			Stadium: Fellows Park; Attendance: 5,152

11 April 1978 41	Carlisle United	2–0	Hereford United	Carlisle
	McVitie 5', 63'			Stadium: Brunton Park; Attendance: 3,848

15 April 1978 42	Hereford United	0–2	Portsmouth	Hereford
			Garwood 27'; Denyer 31'	Stadium: Edgar Street; Attendance: 3,893

18 April 1978 43	Rotherham United	1–0	Hereford United	Rotherham
	Finney 73' (pen.)			Stadium: Millmoor; Attendance: 3,244

22 April 1978 44	Swindon Town	1–0	Hereford United	Swindon
	Cunningham 51'			Stadium: County Ground; Attendance: 4,270

25 April 1978 45	Bury	1–1	Hereford United	Bury
	McIlwraith 72'		Crompton 59'	Stadium: Gigg Lane; Attendance: 2,536

29 April 1978 46	Hereford United	1–1	Wrexham	Hereford
	Barton 28'		Thomas 54'	Stadium: Edgar Street; Attendance: 10,183

=== League Cup ===
13 August 1977 First round first leg	Hereford United	2–0	Bournemouth	Hereford
	Carter 30'; McNeil 37'			Stadium: Edgar Street; Attendance: 3,582

16 August 1977 First round second leg	Bournemouth	4–2	Hereford United	Bournemouth
	Showers 2'; Barton 30' (pen.); Johnson 68'; Howarth 73'		Spiring 1', 80'	Stadium: Dean Court; Attendance: 2,189

23 August 1977 First round replay	Hereford United	1–2 (a.e.t.)	Bournemouth	Hereford
	Davey 57'		Paterson 71'; Barton 119'	Stadium: Edgar Street; Attendance: 3,334

=== FA Cup ===
26 November 1977 First round	Wealdstone	0–0	Hereford United	Harrow
				Stadium: Lower Mead; Attendance: 2,603

29 November 1977 First round replay	Hereford United	2–3	Wealdstone	Hereford
	Sheedy 2'; Davey 66'		Ferry 37', 58'; Moss 50'	Stadium: Edgar Street; Attendance: 4,144
