= List of Hereford United F.C. seasons =

This is a list of seasons played by Hereford United in English football from their formation in 1924 until their liquidation in 2014.

== Seasons ==
Season	League										FA Cup	League Cup	FL Trophy	Welsh Cup	FA Trophy	Top scorer(s)	
Season	Division	Pos	P	W	D	L	F	A	GD	Pts	FA Cup	League Cup	FL Trophy	Welsh Cup	FA Trophy	Player(s)	Gls.
1924–25	BHMC	11th	34	12	8	14	71	70	+1	32	EX	—	—	—	—		
1925–26	BHMC	4th	34	20	4	10	96	65	+31	44	PR	—	—	—	—		
1926–27	BHMC	6th	34	20	2	12	113	64	+49	42	PR	—	—	—	—		
1927–28	BHMC	3rd	34	19	4	11	104	62	+42	42	PR	—	—	—	—		
1928–29	BHML	11th	34	14	7	13	86	61	+25	35	PR	—	—	—	—	W. Edwards	20
1929–30	BHML	13th	34	11	7	16	79	83	−4	29	EX	—	—	—	—	Ivor Rose	45
1930–31	BHML	12th	34	11	8	15	55	75	−20	30	4Q	—	—	—	—	Jack Burn	
1931–32	BHML	7th	34	16	4	14	75	70	+5	36	PR	—	—	—	—		
1932–33	BHML	4th	34	18	7	9	78	58	+20	43	R1	—	—	—	—		
1933–34	BHML	5th	38	23	4	11	97	61	+36	50	1Q	—	—	—	—	Billy Rotton	
1934–35	BHML	9th	36	14	9	13	88	79	+9	37	EX	—	—	—	—		
1935–36	BHML	10th	38	15	4	19	77	81	−4	34	1Q	—	—	—	—	Harry Mardon	
1936–37	BHML	12th	36	15	4	17	61	82	−21	34	1Q	—	—	—	—	Frank Britton	
1937–38	BHML	9th	26	8	7	11	40	44	−4	23	PR	—	—	—	—		
1938–39	BHML (Note: Due to the number of teams having dropped dramatically, the 1938–39 season consisted of two separate "half-season" leagues. The Keys Cup was contested until Christmas and the League Cup for the remainder of the season.)	9th	18	6	1	11	39	47	−8	13	EX	–	–	–	–		
1938–39	BHML	5th	18	7	2	9	28	29	−1	16	EX	–	–	–	–		
1945–46	SFL	2nd	20	13	3	4	59	31	+28	29	1Q	—	—	—	—	?. Brown	14
1946–47	SFL	13th	32	8	7	17	37	85	−48	23	4Q	—	—	R3	—		
1947–48	SFL	5th	34	16	10	8	77	53	+24	42	2Q	—	—	—	—		
1948–49	SFL	12th	42	17	6	19	83	84	−1	40	R2	—	—	—	—		
1949–50	SFL	19th	46	15	8	23	74	76	−2	38	R2	—	—	—	—		
1950–51	SFL	2nd	44	27	7	10	110	69	+41	61	R2	—	—	—	—	Tommy Best	33
1951–52	SFL	5th	42	21	9	12	80	59	+21	51	R1	—	—	—	—	Tommy Best	
1952–53	SFL	15th	42	17	5	20	76	73	+3	39	R2	—	—	—	—	Vernon Crowe	29
1953–54	SFL	12th	42	16	9	17	66	62	+4	41	R2	—	—	—	—		
1954–55	SFL	16th	42	17	5	20	91	72	+19	39	4Q	—	—	—	—	Ron Vigar	33
1955–56	SFL	13th	42	17	7	18	90	90	0	41	R1	—	—	—	—	John Thomson	18
1956–57	SFL	8th	42	19	8	15	96	60	+36	46	R2	—	—	R5	—	Roy Williams	33
1957–58	SFL	7th	42	21	6	15	79	56	+23	48	R3	—	—	SF	—	Frank Fidler Roy Williams	32
1958–59	SFL-R	1st	34	22	5	7	80	37	+43	49	R2	—	—	—	—		
1959–60	SFL-P	12th	42	15	12	15	68	74	−6	42	R1	—	—	—	—		
1960–61	SFL-P	4th	42	21	10	11	83	67	+16	52	R1	—	—	—	—		
1961–62	SFL-P	8th	42	21	2	19	81	69	+12	44	R1	—	—	—	—		
1962–63	SFL-P	14th	40	14	7	19	56	66	−10	35	R1	—	—	SF	—		
1963–64	SFL-P	20th	42	12	7	23	58	86	−28	31	R1	—	—	—	—		
1964–65	SFL-1	1st	42	34	4	4	124	39	+85	72	R1	—	—	QF	—	Albert Derrick	43
1965–66	SFL-P	3rd	42	21	10	11	81	49	+32	52	R3	—	—	R5	—	Ron Fogg	33
1966–67	SFL-P	10th	42	16	12	14	79	61	+18	44	R1	—	—	QF	—	John Charles	37
1967–68	SFL-P	16th	42	17	7	18	58	62	−4	41	R2	—	—	F	—	Albert Derrick	12
1968–69	SFL-P	14th	42	15	9	18	66	62	+4	39	R1	—	—	SF	—	Albert Derrick	
1969–70	SFL-P	10th	42	18	9	15	74	65	+9	45	R2	—	—	SF	R2	John Charles	22
1970–71	SFL-P	4th	42	23	8	11	71	53	+18	54	R2	—	—	R5	SF	Billy Meadows	24
1971–72	SFL-P	2nd	42	24	12	6	68	30	+38	60	R4	—	—	R4	R3	Billy Meadows	24
1972–73	Fourth	2nd	46	23	12	11	56	38	+18	58	R1	R1	—	SF	—	Brian Owen	11
1973–74	Third	18th	46	14	15	17	53	57	−4	43	R4	R1	—	R4	—	Brian Evans Jim Hinch	9
1974–75	Third	12th	46	16	14	16	64	66	−2	46	R2	R3	—	R4	—	Dixie McNeil	32
1975–76	Third	1st	46	26	11	9	86	55	+31	63	R3	R2	—	F	—	Dixie McNeil	37
1976–77	Second	22nd	42	8	15	19	57	78	−21	31	R4	R1	—	—	—	Dixie McNeil	18
1977–78	Third	23rd	46	9	14	23	34	60	−26	32	R1	R1	—	—	—	Steve Davey	7
1978–79	Fourth	14th	46	15	13	18	53	53	0	43	R1	R2	—	—	—	Bobby Gould	13
1979–80	Fourth	21st	46	11	14	21	38	52	−14	36	R2	R1	—	—	—	Frank McGrellis	11
1980–81	Fourth	22nd	46	11	13	22	38	62	−24	35	R2	R1	—	F	—	Frank McGrellis	14
1981–82	Fourth	10th	46	16	19	11	64	58	+6	67	R4	R1	—	SF	—	Stewart Phillips	18
1982–83	Fourth	24th	46	11	8	27	42	79	−37	41	R1	R1	—	QF	—	Stewart Phillips	20
1983–84	Fourth	11th	46	16	15	15	54	53	+1	63	R1	R1	R1	SF	—	Stewart Phillips	21
1984–85	Fourth	5th	46	22	11	13	65	47	+18	77	R3	R1	R1	QF	—	Stewart Phillips	25
1985–86	Fourth	10th	46	18	10	18	74	73	+1	64	R2	R2	AF	SF	—	Ollie Kearns	21
1986–87	Fourth	16th	46	14	11	21	60	61	−1	53	R1	R1	QF	R3	—	Ollie Kearns	20
1987–88	Fourth	19th	46	14	12	20	41	59	−18	54	R2	R2	QF	R3	—	Phil Stant	13
1988–89	Fourth	15th	46	14	16	16	66	72	−6	58	R1	R1	SF	SF	—	Phil Stant	32
1989–90	Fourth	17th	46	15	10	21	56	62	−6	55	R4	R2	QF	F	—	Colin Robinson	12
1990–91	Fourth	17th	46	13	14	19	53	58	−5	53	R1	R1	QF	SF	—	Jon Narbett	12
1991–92	Fourth	17th	42	12	8	22	44	57	−13	44	R4	R1	R1	R4	—	Simon Brain	14
1992–93	Div 3	17th	42	10	15	17	47	60	−13	45	R2	R1	R1	R4	—	Owen Pickard	13
1993–94	Div 3	20th	42	12	6	24	60	79	−19	42	R2	R2	R1	QF	—	Chris Pike	19
1994–95	Div 3	16th	42	12	13	17	45	62	−17	49	R1	R2	QF	—	—	Steve White	18
1995–96	Div 3	6th	46	20	14	12	65	47	+18	74	R3	R1	SF	—	—	Steve White	32
1996–97	Div 3	24th	46	11	14	21	50	65	−15	47	R1	R2	R1	—	—	Adrian Foster	17
1997–98	Conf	6th	42	18	13	11	56	49	+7	67	R3	—	—	—	R2	Neil Grayson	16
1998–99	Conf	13th	42	15	10	17	49	46	+3	55	3Q	—	—	—	R2	Ian Wright	9
1999–00	Conf	8th	42	15	14	13	61	52	+9	59	R3	—	—	—	R3	Rob Elmes Paul Fewings	15
2000–01	Conf	11th	42	14	15	13	60	46	+14	57	4Q	—	R2	—	SF	Rob Elmes	18
2001–02	Conf	17th	42	14	10	18	50	53	−3	52	R2	—	—	—	R5	Gavin Williams	14
2002–03	Conf	6th	42	19	7	16	64	51	+13	64	R1	—	R1	—	R3	Steve Guinan	14
2003–04	Conf	2nd	42	28	7	7	103	44	+59	91	R1	—	R2	—	R3	Steve Guinan	28
2004–05	Conf	2nd	42	21	11	10	68	41	+27	74	R2	—	SF	—	QF	Adam Stansfield	22
2005–06	Conf	2nd	42	22	14	6	59	33	+26	80	R2	—	SF	—	R3	Andy Williams	13
2006–07	FL2	16th	46	14	13	19	45	53	−8	55	R3	R2	R1	—	—	Alan Connell	10
2007–08	FL2	3rd	46	26	10	10	72	41	+31	88	R4	R2	R2	—	—	Theo Robinson	16
2008–09	FL1	24th	46	9	7	30	42	79	−37	34	R1	R1	R2	—	—	Steve Guinan	15
2009–10	FL2	16th	46	17	8	21	54	65	−11	59	R2	R2	SF	—	—	Marc Pugh	13
2010–11	FL2	21st	46	12	17	17	50	66	−16	50 (Note: Deducted three points for fielding an ineligible player)	R4	R1	R2	—	—	Stuart Fleetwood	18
2011–12	FL2	23rd	46	10	14	22	50	70	−20	44	R1	R2	R1	—	—	Tom Barkhuizen	12
2012–13	Conf	6th	46	19	13	14	73	63	+10	70	R2	—	—	—	R2	Ryan Bowman	19
2013–14	Conf	20th (Note: Despite initially avoiding relegation at the end of the league season, on 10 June 2014, the club were expelled from the Conference due to financial irregularities)	46	13	12	21	44	63	−19	51	R1	—	—	—	R1	Michael Rankine	7
2014–15	SFL-P	Record expunged (Note: Records and statistics expunged on 5 January 2015)									1Q	—	—	—	3Q	—	—

== Key ==
- Pos = Final position
- P = Played
- W = Games won
- D = Games drawn
- L = Games lost
- F = Goals for
- A = Goals against
- Pts = Points
- Second = Football League Second Division
- Third = Football League Third Division
- FL1 = Football League One
- Fourth = Football League Fourth Division
- Div 3 = Football League Division Three
- FL2 = Football League Two
- Conf = Conference National
- SFL-P = Southern League Premier Division
- SFL-1 = Southern League Division One
- SFL-R = Southern League Regional North-West
- SFL = Southern League
- BHML = Birmingham & District League
- BHMC = Birmingham Combination
- EX = Extra preliminary round
- PR = preliminary round
- 1Q = First qualifying round
- 2Q = Second qualifying round
- 3Q = Third qualifying round
- 4Q = Fourth qualifying round
- R1 = First round
- R2 = Second round
- R3 = Third round
- R4 = Fourth round
- R5 = Fifth round
- QF = Quarter-finals
- SF = Semi-finals
- AF = Area final
- F = Final

Winners	Runners-up	Promoted	Relegated
