= 1979–80 Hereford United F.C. season =

Hereford United
1979–80 season
- Chairman: Peter Hill
- Manager: Mike Bailey (until October 1979); Peter Isaac (caretaker); Frank Lord (from November 1979)
- Stadium: Edgar Street
- Division Four: 21st
- League Cup: First round
- FA Cup: Second round
- Top goalscorer: League: Frank McGrellis (10); All: Frank McGrellis (11)
- Highest home attendance: 7,945 v Newport County, Division Four, 7 April 1980
- Lowest home attendance: 1,995 v Bournemouth, Division Four, 7 November 1979
- Average home league attendance: 3,355
- Biggest win: 3–1 v York City (H), Division Four, 18 August 1979
- Biggest defeat: 0–3 v Hartlepool United (A), Division Four, 10 November 1979

The 1979–80 season was the 51st season of competitive football played by Hereford United Football Club and their eighth in the Football League. The club competed in Division Four, as well as the League Cup and FA Cup.

== Summary ==
In October, with Hereford 12th in the table, manager Mike Bailey left to become head coach at Charlton Athletic, and player-coach Bobby Gould also departed to become assistant manager at Chelsea alongside Geoff Hurst. On the playing side, the team had already been weakened by the sale of Steve Emery to First Division Derby County for a club record transfer fee of £100,000.

Frank Lord arrived from South African club Cape Town City to fill the vacant managerial role but was unable to reverse Hereford's declining fortunes. Despite having won their opening three league matches of the season under Bailey, they eventually finished in 21st place and were therefore forced to apply for re-election to the Football League for the first time.

== Squad ==
Players who made one appearance or more for Hereford United F.C. during the 1979-80 season

Pos.	Nat.	Name	League		League Cup		FA Cup		Total	
Pos.	Nat.	Name	Apps	Goals	Apps	Goals	Apps	Goals	Apps	Goals
GK	SCO	Tommy Hughes	46	0	2	0	2	0	50	0
DF	ENG	Danny Bartley	11	0	0	0	0	0	11	0
DF	ENG	Phil Burrows	42	1	0	0	2	0	44	1
DF	WAL	Stuart Cornes	16(1)	2	0	0	0	0	16(1)	2
DF	ENG	Steve Emery	6	1	2	0	0	0	8	1
DF	ENG	Andy Feeley	25	3	2	0	2	0	29	3
DF	ENG	Paul Hunt	24(2)	3	0	0	0	0	24(2)	3
DF	ENG	John Layton	33(2)	0	2	1	2	1	37(2)	2
DF	WAL	Julian Marshall	23	1	2	0	2	0	27	1
DF	ENG	Chris Price	42	0	1	0	2	0	45	0
DF	ENG	Valmore Thomas	11	0	2	0	0	0	13	0
MF	ENG	Alan Birchenall	11	0	0	0	0(1)	0	11(1)	0
MF	SCO	Dave Cunningham	28(2)	2	0	0	2	0	30(2)	2
MF	ENG	Paul Gilchrist	11	1	0	0	0	0	11	1
MF	NIR	Jimmy Harvey (on loan from Arsenal)	11	0	0	0	0	0	11	0
MF	SCO	Ian Hendry	6	0	1	0	0	0	7	0
MF	WAL	Kyle Holmes	2(1)	0	0	0	0	0	2(1)	0
MF	ENG	Peter Spiring	32(4)	1	2	0	2	0	36(4)	1
MF	ENG	Kenny Stephens	5(1)	0	0	0	0	0	5(1)	0
MF	ENG	Winston White	30(4)	2	2	1	2	0	34(4)	3
FW	ENG	Fred Binney	19	4	0	0	0	0	19	4
FW	ENG	Bobby Gould	3(2)	0	1(1)	0	0	0	4(3)	0
FW	WAL	Dave Jones	19(2)	3	1	0	1	0	21(2)	3
FW	SCO	Frank McGrellis	39(2)	10	2	0	2	1	43(2)	11
FW	WAL	Paul Morris	1(1)	1	0	0	0	0	1(1)	1
FW	ENG	Stewart Phillips	10(1)	2	0(1)	0	1	0	11(2)	2

== League table ==
Pos	Team	Pld	W	D	L	GF	GA	GD	Pts	Promotion
19	Hartlepool United	46	14	10	22	59	64	−5	38	
20	Port Vale	46	12	12	22	56	70	−14	36	
21	Hereford United	46	11	14	21	38	52	−14	36	Re-elected
22	Darlington	46	9	17	20	50	74	−24	35	Re-elected
23	Crewe Alexandra	46	11	13	22	35	68	−33	35	Re-elected

== Results ==
=== Fourth Division ===
18 August 1979 1	Hereford United	3–1	York City	Hereford
	McGrellis 11', 44'; Jones 57'		Randall 31'	Stadium: Edgar Street; Attendance: 3,149

20 August 1979 2	Port Vale	0–1	Hereford United	Stoke-on-Trent
			Feeley 42'	Stadium: Vale Park; Attendance: 2,744

25 August 1979 3	Hereford United	1–0	Darlington	Hereford
	McGrellis 31'			Stadium: Edgar Street; Attendance: 4,031

1 September 1979 4	Walsall	3–2	Hereford United	Walsall
	Buckley 7', 16' (pen.); Serella 78'		Feeley 4'; Emery 25'	Stadium: Fellows Park; Attendance: 4,527

8 September 1979 5	Hereford United	1–2	Tranmere Rovers	Hereford
	White 17'		Craven 38'; Lumby 50'	Stadium: Edgar Street; Attendance: 3,812

15 September 1979 6	Halifax Town	1–0	Hereford United	Halifax
	Mountford 30'			Stadium: The Shay; Attendance: 1,500

19 September 1979 7	Torquay United	1–1	Hereford United	Torquay
	Smith 54'		Hunt 29'	Stadium: Plainmoor; Attendance: 2,560

22 September 1979 8	Hereford United	2–1	Wigan Athletic	Hereford
	Hunt 53'; Phillips 79'		Wright 46'	Stadium: Edgar Street; Attendance: 3,891

29 September 1979 9	Peterborough United	2–0	Hereford United	Peterborough
	Kellock 25' (pen.); Chard 73'			Stadium: London Road; Attendance: 4,051

3 October 1979 10	Hereford United	0–0	Torquay United	Hereford
				Stadium: Edgar Street; Attendance: 3,062

5 October 1979 11	Stockport County	2–1	Hereford United	Stockport
	Henson 45'; Czuczman 87'		Spiring 33'	Stadium: Edgeley Park; Attendance: 3,119

10 October 1979 12	Hereford United	0–0	Port Vale	Hereford
				Stadium: Edgar Street; Attendance: 2,761

13 October 1979 13	Hereford United	2–0	Crewe Alexandra	Hereford
	McGrellis 4', 47'			Stadium: Edgar Street; Attendance: 3,030

20 October 1979 14	Northampton Town	2–0	Hereford United	Northampton
	Farmer 29', 52'			Stadium: County Ground; Attendance: 2,319

23 October 1979 15	Bournemouth	2–2	Hereford United	Bournemouth
	Chambers 32'; Butler 41'		Cunningham 22'; McGrellis 25'	Stadium: Dean Court; Attendance: 2,838

27 October 1979 16	Hereford United	0–1	Aldershot	Hereford
			Brodie 63'	Stadium: Edgar Street; Attendance: 2,939

3 November 1979 17	York City	3–1	Hereford United	York
	Lorimer 25'; Eccles 45'; Randall 65'		McGrellis 51'	Stadium: Bootham Crescent; Attendance: 2,226

7 November 1979 18	Hereford United	2–1	Bournemouth	Hereford
	Phillips 11'; McGrellis 53'		MacDougall 58'	Stadium: Edgar Street; Attendance: 1,995

10 November 1979 19	Hartlepool United	3–0	Hereford United	Hartlepool
	Loadwick 20'; Newton 41', 50'			Stadium: Victoria Park; Attendance: 2,281

17 November 1979 20	Hereford United	1–1	Rochdale	Hereford
	Feeley 28'		Marshall 5' (o.g.)	Stadium: Edgar Street; Attendance: 2,767

1 December 1979 21	Huddersfield Town	0–1	Hereford United	Huddersfield
			White 17'	Stadium: Leeds Road; Attendance: 5,582

8 December 1979 22	Hereford United	0–2	Bradford City	Hereford
			Staniforth 3'; Wood 57'	Stadium: Edgar Street; Attendance: 3,337

26 December 1979 23	Hereford United	0–0	Portsmouth	Hereford
				Stadium: Edgar Street; Attendance: 4,514

29 December 1979 24	Scunthorpe United	1–0	Hereford United	Scunthorpe
	Green 73'			Stadium: Old Show Ground; Attendance: 1,764

1 January 1980 25	Newport County	1–0	Hereford United	Newport
	Vaughan 15' (pen.)			Stadium: Somerton Park; Attendance: 7,213

5 January 1980 26	Hereford United	2–2	Doncaster Rovers	Hereford
	Jones 57', 81'		Riley 22', 54'	Stadium: Edgar Street; Attendance: 2,793

12 January 1980 27	Hereford United	0–1	Walsall	Hereford
			Penn 88'	Stadium: Edgar Street; Attendance: 4,814

26 January 1980 28	Darlington	1–1	Hereford United	Darlington
	Stalker 64'		Binney 10'	Stadium: Feethams; Attendance: 1,447

2 February 1980 29	Hereford United	2–0	Halifax Town	Hereford
	Marshall 70'; Binney 89'			Stadium: Edgar Street; Attendance: 2,814

6 February 1980 30	Lincoln City	2–0	Hereford United	Lincoln
	Keeley 35'; Cunningham 66'			Stadium: Sincil Bank; Attendance: 2,893

9 February 1980 31	Wigan Athletic	1–1	Hereford United	Wigan
	Corrigan 59'		Burrows 73'	Stadium: Springfield Park; Attendance: 6,381

16 February 1980 32	Hereford United	0–1	Peterborough United	Hereford
			Syrett 29'	Stadium: Edgar Street; Attendance: 2,601

23 February 1980 33	Crewe Alexandra	1–0	Hereford United	Crewe
	Palios 50'			Stadium: Gresty Road; Attendance: 2,528

1 March 1980 34	Hereford United	0–1	Northampton Town	Hereford
			Bowen 68'	Stadium: Edgar Street; Attendance: 2,299

8 March 1980 35	Aldershot	3–3	Hereford United	Aldershot
	Crosby 14'; Garwood 15', 72'		Cornes 33'; Morris 56'; McGrellis 69'	Stadium: Recreation Ground; Attendance: 2,932

15 March 1980 36	Hereford United	2–0	Stockport County	Hereford
	Cornes 41'; McGrellis 85'			Stadium: Edgar Street; Attendance: 2,424

22 March 1980 37	Hereford United	2–1	Hartlepool United	Hereford
	Binney 32', 70' (pen.)		Hampton 9'	Stadium: Edgar Street; Attendance: 2,782

25 March 1980 38	Tranmere Rovers	0–0	Hereford United	Birkenhead
				Stadium: Prenton Park; Attendance: 1,214

2 April 1980 39	Hereford United	0–0	Lincoln City	Hereford
				Stadium: Edgar Street; Attendance: 2,773

5 April 1980 40	Portsmouth	0–0	Hereford United	Portsmouth
				Stadium: Fratton Park; Attendance: 15,175

7 April 1980 41	Hereford United	0–2	Newport County	Hereford
			Vaughan 12'; Gwyther 67'	Stadium: Edgar Street; Attendance: 7,945

11 April 1980 42	Doncaster Rovers	1–0	Hereford United	Doncaster
	Lister 21'			Stadium: Belle Vue; Attendance: 2,862

19 April 1980 43	Hereford United	1–3	Huddersfield Town	Hereford
	Hart 76' (o.g.)		Kindon 15'; Fletcher 65', 90'	Stadium: Edgar Street; Attendance: 4,278

26 April 1980 44	Bradford City	1–0	Hereford United	Bradford
	Wood 58'			Stadium: Valley Parade; Attendance: 7,387

3 May 1980 45	Hereford United	1–1	Scunthorpe United	Hereford
	Cunningham 67'		Pilling 12'	Stadium: Edgar Street; Attendance: 2,099

6 May 1980 46	Rochdale	0–2	Hereford United	Rochdale
			Gilchrist 23'; Hunt 32'	Stadium: Spotland; Attendance: 1,318

=== League Cup ===
1 August 1979 First round first leg	Hereford United	1–3	Exeter City	Hereford
	White 45'		Bowker 27', 67', 69'	Stadium: Edgar Street; Attendance: 3,278

15 August 1979 First round second leg	Exeter City	2–1	Hereford United	Exeter
	Pullar 44'; Pearson 80'		Layton 55'	Stadium: St James Park; Attendance: 4,312

=== FA Cup ===
24 November 1979 First round	Hereford United	1–0	Northampton Town	Hereford
	Layton 16'			Stadium: Edgar Street; Attendance: 3,384

15 December 1979 First round	Hereford United	1–2	Aldershot	Hereford
	McGrellis 8'		Marshall 26' (o.g.); Needham 76'	Stadium: Edgar Street; Attendance: 4,051
