= Steve Ritchie =

Steve Ritchie may refer to:

- Richard Stephen Ritchie (born 1942), known as Steve, U.S. Air Force officer
- Steve Ritchie (pinball designer) (born 1950), American pinball designer
- Steve Ritchie (footballer) (born 1954), Scottish football player
- Steve Ritchie, CEO of Papa John's
- Stephen Ritchie (born 1970), Ulster Rugby player of the professional era
- Stevi Ritchie (born 1980), singer

== See also ==
- George Stephen Ritchie (1914–2012), Royal Navy Officer, Hydrographer of the Navy
