= Terry Paine =

English footballer and manager (born 1939)

Terry Paine MBE
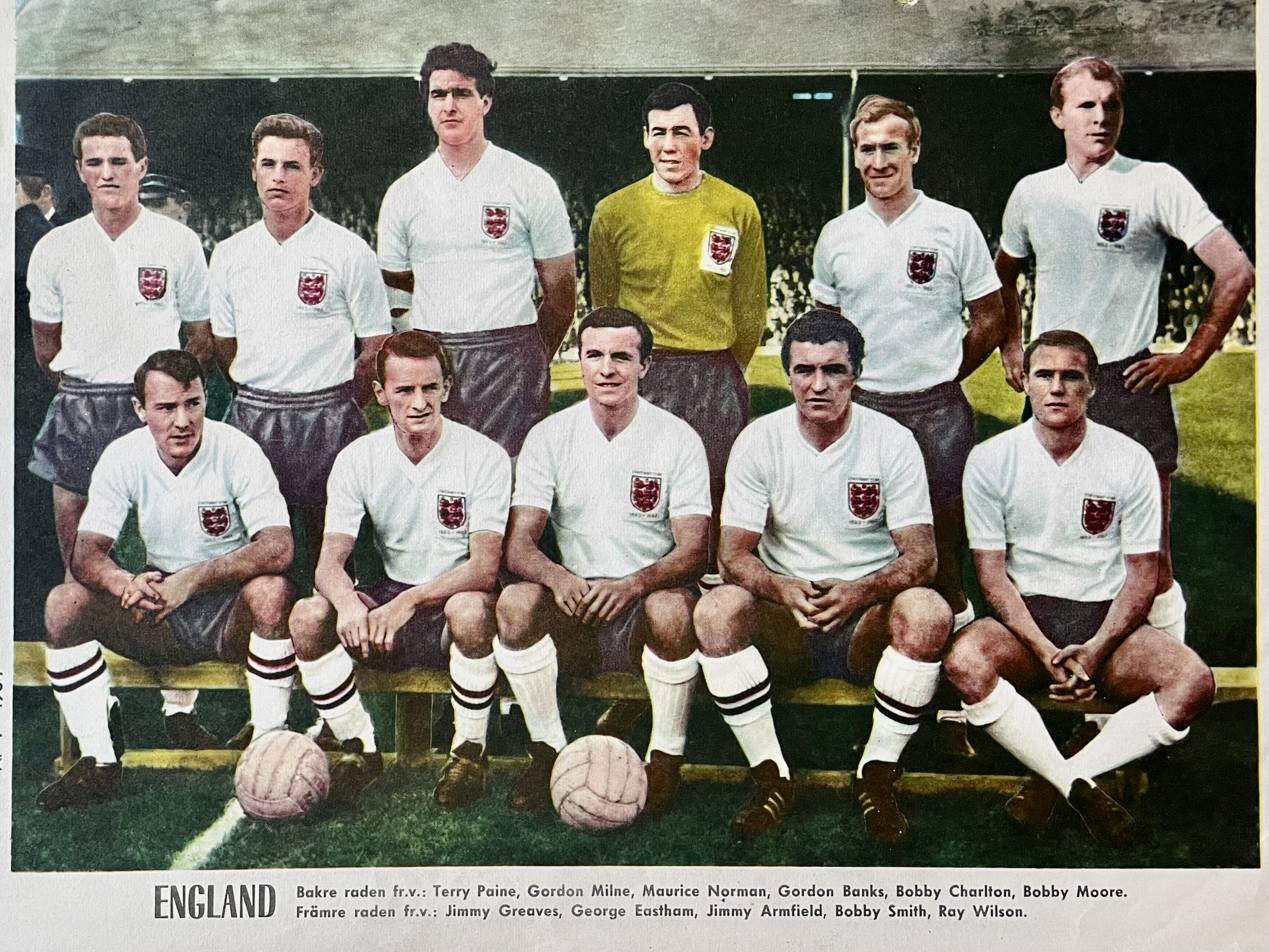

Personal information
- Full name: Terence Lionel Paine
- Date of birth: 23 March 1939 (age 87)
- Place of birth: Winchester, England
- Height: 5 ft 7 in (1.70 m)
- Position: Forward

Youth career
- 1954–1956: Winchester City
- 1956–1957: Southampton

Senior career*
Years	Team	Apps	(Gls)
1957–1974	Southampton	713	(160)
1974–1977	Hereford United	111	(8)
1979–1980	Cheltenham Town		
Total		824	(168)

International career
1963–1966	England	19	(7)

Managerial career
- 1980: Cheltenham Town
Medal record
Men's football
Representing England
FIFA World Cup
Winner	1966 England
- * Club domestic league appearances and goals

Terence Lionel Paine MBE (born 23 March 1939) is an English former professional footballer. Originally from Winchester, Paine is best known for his career with Southampton, for whom he made a club-record 808 appearances across 18 seasons. He played primarily as a winger, but was also comfortable in other midfield positions and as a forward.

Paine began his career as a youth player with local club Winchester City, before signing professional terms with Southampton in 1956. He quickly became a regular for the team as a right-sided winger, and was also on occasion played on the left wing, in the centre of midfield, or up front. In 1960, he was a part of the squad which won the club's only Third Division title, and in 1966 helped the club to its first promotion to the First Division. Paine left Southampton in 1974, after the club was relegated back to the Second Division.

For the last three years of his playing career, Paine played for Hereford United, helping the club win its first Third Division title in 1976 and thus achieve promotion to the Second Division. He retired at the end of the 1976–77 season, and held a number of coaching roles before taking on the job of first team manager at Cheltenham Town in 1980, where he also played the occasional match. He left after just half a season. He has since held a number of coaching roles at various clubs and worked as a sports pundit in South Africa.

At international level, Paine represented England between 1963 and 1966. He was part of the victorious 1966 World Cup squad. At the tournament, Paine only played one match, against Mexico in which he was injured. As only the 11 players on the field in the final received medals, he had to wait until 2009 to receive a winners' medal.

Overall, he made over 1,000 appearances in his career.

== Club career ==
=== Winchester City ===
Paine worked as a coach-builder at Eastleigh British Railway Depot, and played his early football for his local club, Winchester City and featured in their Amateur Cup run in 1956–57. He had trials at both Portsmouth and Arsenal (for whom he scored twice in a trial match) but Winchester's manager was former Saints player Harry Osman who alerted Ted Bates to Paine's potential and in August 1956, the Football Echo reported "Terry Paine, a Winchester City forward, in whom Arsenal were interested has been added to the playing staff list." Paine had been deemed "a bit small" at an earlier trial at Arsenal.

=== Southampton ===
Paine signed amateur forms with Southampton in August 1956 and then in February 1957, Saints signed Paine as a full-timer when he appeared in a reserve game against Bristol Rovers. The following month he made his League debut at home to Brentford, just a week before his 18th birthday. Paine did not score in the 3–3 draw but the crowd were impressed by his ball-juggling skills, pace and ability to use either foot. Paine's rise to stardom was meteoric and, following just one outing in the Reserves, he was given his first team debut. A week later, on his birthday, he scored in a 1–1 draw against Aldershot. By the end of his first season he had become a virtual regular, switching from left wing to right wing and over the next 17 years, he only missed 22 league games.

Oozing confidence, the young winger often ruffled a few feathers among his more senior colleagues and some raised their eyebrows at the rapid promotion of Paine.

Possessing superb ball-crossing skills, Paine could "land a ball on a sixpence" and Derek Reeves and George O'Brien were the first of many forwards to capitalise on the expertise of Paine, when Saints were Third Division champions in 1959–60.

Paine was the regular replacement when a goalkeeper became injured (this was before substitutes were allowed). In the first match of the 1961–62 season, at home to Plymouth Argyle on 19 August, Ron Reynolds broke his ankle. Paine replaced him in goal but let in 2 goals so he in turn was replaced by Cliff Huxford; unfortunately Paine was unable to create the equalising goal and Saints lost 2–1.

Over the next few seasons Paine, with help from fellow-winger John Sydenham, provided the pinpoint crosses on which forwards such as Ron Davies and Martin Chivers were to thrive. Gradually, with the almost total demise of wingers, Paine took his passing proficiencies into midfield and his dextrous distribution was partially instrumental in the launching of Mick Channon's rise to prominence. Steering clear of serious injury in a remarkable way, Paine was often guilty of committing petty fouls and any games missed were usually the result of suspensions arising from such indiscretions.

In his Southampton career, Paine made 713 league appearances, scoring 160 goals, plus a further 102 cup and other appearances, with another 27 goals. This places him fourth on the club's list of all-time goalscorers. He was an "ever-present" for a record number of 7 seasons.

An era ended when Bates retired from management in 1973 and Paine moved to Hereford United in the summer of 1974 to make a further 106 appearances thus establishing an all-time league record of 819 appearances. Tony Ford and goalkeeper Peter Shilton have since passed that figure, but the achievement contributed to Paine being awarded the MBE for his services to football.

=== Hereford United ===
In July 1974, Paine became player-coach at Hereford United where, alongside manager John Sillett, and serving prolific scorer Dixie McNeil, he helped United romp away with the Division Three championship.

== International career ==
Paine was recognised at England Under-23 level and scored in an England Under-23 match against Holland in March 1960. In 1963, he won his first full cap and later that year he scored a hat trick at Wembley against Northern Ireland to become the first outside-right to score three goals for England since Stanley Matthews in 1937.

Paine featured in England manager Alf Ramsey's plans and he was one of the 22-man squad for the 1966 World Cup. He played in only one match, against Mexico, and was injured in his 19th and, as it turned out, his last international. Paine was one of four England players to play for England in the tournament without playing in the final itself, the others being Jimmy Greaves, John Connelly and Ian Callaghan.

In the 1966 World Cup final only the 11 players on the pitch at the end of the 4–2 win over West Germany received medals. Following a Football Association led campaign to persuade FIFA to award medals to all the winners' squad members, Paine was presented with his medal by Gordon Brown at a ceremony at 10 Downing Street on 10 June 2009.

== Management career ==
Upon retirement, Paine decided to remain in football concentrating on coaching, including a spell as manager of non-league Cheltenham Town, combining his role at Cheltenham with running a pub in Cheltenham town centre called the Prince of Wales on Portland Street. Much of the 1980s were spent in Johannesburg where he went on to coach Wits University Football Club, but in 1988 he returned to England to work at Coventry City with John Sillett, previously his manager at Hereford.

== Media career ==
Paine previously worked as a football presenter on digital satellite TV sports channel SuperSport in South Africa. He often appeared alongside former Manchester United goalkeeper Gary Bailey, on English Premiership and UEFA Champions League matches.

== Personal life ==
Paine has been honoured by having one of the hospitality suites at the St Mary's Stadium named after him.

In 2009, Paine was awarded an honorary degree by Solent University.

During the run up to South Africa's successful 2010 World Cup bid, Paine was a "Bid Ambassador" and was part of the delegation in Zürich when South Africa's victory in the bidding was announced.

On 1 January 2013, Paine took up the appointment of Honorary President of Southampton, which includes a remit to act as a club ambassador, both home and abroad.

== Career statistics ==
Appearances and goals by club, season and competition
Club	Season	League			FA Cup		League Cup		Other		Total	
Club	Season	Division	Apps	Goals	Apps	Goals	Apps	Goals	Apps	Goals	Apps	Goals
Southampton	1956–57	Third Division South	9	2	0	0	–		–		9	2
Southampton	1957–58	Third Division South	44	12	2	0	–		–		46	12
Southampton	1958–59	Third Division	46	13	3	1	–		–		49	14
Southampton	1959–60	Third Division	46	8	6	3	–		–		52	11
Southampton	1960–61	Second Division	42	18	2	1	6	4	–		50	23
Southampton	1961–62	Second Division	41	8	2	0	2	0	–		45	8
Southampton	1962–63	Second Division	42	10	7	1	3	2	–		52	13
Southampton	1963–64	Second Division	41	21	1	1	1	0	–		43	22
Southampton	1964–65	Second Division	42	14	2	0	2	1	–		46	15
Southampton	1965–66	Second Division	40	16	1	0	2	1	–		43	17
Southampton	1966–67	First Division	42	11	3	0	3	1	–		48	12
Southampton	1967–68	First Division	41	9	4	0	1	0	–		46	9
Southampton	1968–69	First Division	42	9	4	2	4	0	–		50	11
Southampton	1969–70	First Division	36	3	3	1	2	0	6	2	47	6
Southampton	1970–71	First Division	41	3	4	0	1	0	–		46	3
Southampton	1971–72	First Division	40	2	2	0	2	0	2	0	46	2
Southampton	1972–73	First Division	37	0	1	0	4	1	–		42	1
Southampton	1973–74	First Division	41	1	4	1	3	0	–		48	2
Southampton	Total		713	160	51	11	36	10	8	2	808	183
Hereford United	1974–75	Third Division	40	4	2	0	4	1	1	0	47	5
Hereford United	1975–76	Third Division	44	1	4	0	4	1	2	1	54	3
Hereford United	1976–77	Second Division	27	3	2	0	2	0	–		31	3
Hereford United	Total		111	8	8	0	10	2	2	1	129	11
Cheltenham Town	1979–80	Southern League Midlands Division	No data available									
Career total			824	168	59	11	46	12	10	3	929	192

== Honours ==
Southampton

- Football League Third Division: 1959–60

Hereford United

- Football League Third Division: 1975–76

England

- FIFA World Cup: 1966
