= Steve Aizlewood =

Welsh footballer

Personal information
- Full name: Steven Aizlewood
- Date of birth: 9 October 1952
- Place of birth: Newport, Wales
- Date of death: 6 August 2013 (aged 60)
- Position: Defender

Youth career
- 1968–1969: Newport County

Senior career*
Years	Team	Apps	(Gls)
1969–1976	Newport County	197	(18)
1976–1979	Swindon Town	112	(10)
1979–1983	Portsmouth	176	(13)
1983–1985	Waterlooville	?	(?)

International career
	Wales U23	5	(0)
- * Club domestic league appearances and goals

Steven Aizlewood (9 October 1952 – 6 August 2013) was a Welsh professional footballer and a Wales Under-23 international defender.

== Career ==
Aizlewood was born in Newport and began his career at his local team Newport County, signing a youth contract with the team in 1968. He went on to become a professional with the club in the following season. He made his debut at the age of 16 years 194 days, making him the youngest ever Newport County player until his record was surpassed by Regan Poole in September 2014. Aizlewood appeared in nearly two hundred league games for Newport County. He was transferred to Swindon Town in 1976 for £13,500 and spent 4 years at the Wiltshire club until moving once more to Portsmouth in 1979 for £45,000. He captained the Portsmouth team that won the Third Division Championship in 1982–83.

His league career finished at Portsmouth in 1983, after which he played for two seasons for non-league club Waterlooville in the Southern League.

Aizlewood played five games for the Wales national under-23 football team. His brother Mark Aizlewood was also a Wales international footballer.

== Honours ==
Portsmouth

- Football League Third Division: 1982–83

== See also ==
- Swindon Town player profile
- Mike Neasom, Mick Cooper & Doug Robinson (1984). Pompey: The History of Portsmouth Football Club. Milestone Publications. ISBN 0-903852-50-0.
