= Derek Jefferson =

English footballer (born 1948)

Personal information
- Date of birth: 5 September 1948 (age 78)
- Place of birth: Morpeth, Northumberland, England
- Position: Centre-back

Senior career*
Years	Team	Apps	(Gls)
1966–1972	Ipswich Town	166	(1)
1972–1976	Wolverhampton Wanderers	42	(0)
1976	Boston Minutemen	10	(1)
1976	Washington Diplomats	11	(0)
1976	→ Sheffield Wednesday (loan)	5	(0)
1976–1978	Hereford United	39	(0)
Total		273	(2)
- * Club domestic league appearances and goals

Derek Jefferson (born 5 September 1948) is an English former professional footballer who played as a centre-back. During his career he made over 150 appearances for Ipswich Town between 1966 and 1972, where he was nicknamed 'Chopper'.

== Career ==
Jefferson joined Ipswich Town as a youth trainee, before making his senior debut on 28 January 1967 in a 4–1 win over Shrewsbury Town in the FA Cup. Although this was his only appearance in the 1966–67 season, he broke into the first team in the following campaign and was a regular as the club won the Second Division Championship.

After a further four full seasons in the top flight at Portman Road, he moved to fellow Division One club Wolves in October 1972. He immediately made his debut in a 1–1 draw at Manchester City on 7 October and went on to make 24 appearances that season. However, this proved his highest seasonal tally for the Midlanders, as he never became a first choice player, managing 52 appearances in total for the club spread over four years.

Wolves allowed Jefferson to compete in the North American Soccer League in the summer of 1976, and later loaned him out to Sheffield Wednesday during October 1976. The following month, he left Molineux for good when he joined Hereford United, playing in the second tier for the only time in their history. (His son Christopher currently plays for the Hereford-based non-league club Westfields).

After finishing his playing career, Jefferson became Reserve Team manager at Birmingham City under Jim Smith. He left after five years at this post to devote himself to Christian work, which he is still involved with, acting as a sports coach in a church-affiliated program in Solihull.
