= Mick Wood (footballer, born 1952) =

English footballer

Personal information
- Full name: Michael James Wood
- Date of birth: 3 July 1952 (age 74)
- Place of birth: Bury, England
- Position: Left back

Senior career*
Years	Team	Apps	(Gls)
1970–1978	Blackburn Rovers	148	(2)
1978–1982	Bradford City	146	(9)
1982–1984	Halifax Town	81	(2)
- Dudley Hill Athletic
Total		375	(13)
- * Club domestic league appearances and goals

Michael James Wood (born 3 July 1952) is an English former professional footballer who played as a left back.

== Career ==
Born in Bury, Wood played for Blackburn Rovers, Bradford City, Halifax Town and Dudley Hill Athletic.

== Later life ==
Wood later worked for Bradford City Council Leisure Services as a facility manager, and also as a physiotherapist at the Football Association's Centre of Excellence.
