= Tony Byrne (footballer, born 1946) =

Irish footballer

- Byrne in 1973

Personal information
- Full name: Anthony Brendan Byrne
- Date of birth: 2 February 1946
- Place of birth: Rathdowney, Ireland
- Date of death: 13 June 2016 (aged 70)
- Height: 5 ft 7 in (1.70 m)
- Position: Left-back

Senior career*
Years	Team	Apps	(Gls)
1963–1964	Millwall	1	(0)
1964–1974	Southampton	93	(3)
1974–1977	Hereford United	55	(0)
1977–1979	Newport County	80	(1)
- Trowbridge Town

International career
1969–1973	Republic of Ireland	14	(0)
- * Club domestic league appearances and goals

Anthony Brendan Byrne (2 February 1946 – 13 June 2016) was an Irish professional footballer. He won a total of 14 caps for the Republic of Ireland and during his career from 1963 to 1978 played for Millwall, Southampton, Hereford United and Newport County. He was originally a midfield player who switched to left-back and he had a career total of 229 league games scoring 4 goals.

== Early life ==
He was born in Rathdowney, County Laois, Ireland, on 2 February 1946. His early sporting background was in hurling before he emigrated to London with his parents at the age of 12.

== Playing career ==
He began his career as a footballer at Millwall, where he was originally a midfield player before switching to left-back. After only one appearance for Millwall, he was signed by Ted Bates for Southampton for a fee of £8,000 in August 1964. Although he made his Saints debut in an FA Cup tie against Crystal Palace in January 1965, Byrne took a long time to break into the Southampton first team, mainly because of a broken leg sustained in a reserve team match in April 1966. He eventually overcame this setback to make his league debut on 18 April 1967 in front of a 54,921 crowd at Old Trafford as relegation-threatened Saints went down 3–0 to Manchester United. He was slightly built for a defender and "although quick and diligent, he struggled to carve a permanent niche in Southampton's notoriously robust rearguard".

His best season with The Saints was 1969–70, in which he made 35 league appearances, playing in defence alongside Joe Kirkup and John McGrath, as Saints again fought to avoid relegation. He scored his first league goal in the final match of the season in a 1–1 draw against Derby County. Having given away Derby's 88th-minute goal after a poor back-pass, Byrne quickly turned from villain to hero as he slotted in a bobbling ball in the 90th minute in a dramatic climax to the season.

He stayed at The Dell for ten years during which time he made a total of 114 first team appearances and won 14 Irish caps.

In August 1974 he moved to Hereford United to join former Saints' colleague Terry Paine for three seasons before finishing his career with Newport County.

Amazingly his Irish international debut in October 1969 in Dublin against Denmark was the first time he had kicked a ball in his native land because he had emigrated to London with his parents at the age of 12 and, until then, had played only hurling.

== Later life ==
After retiring from football, he worked as a foreman at Hereford golf course before working as a builder for EC Joseph & Sons LTD in Hereford.

In the 1980s Byrne purchased the derelict Tivoli Cinema in The Liberties in Dublin and refurnished it, converting it into a theatre and music venue/nightclub.

He died on 13 June 2016, aged 70.
