= Jimmy Lindsay (footballer, born 1949) =

Scottish footballer

Personal information
- Full name: James Young Lindsay
- Date of birth: 12 July 1949 (age 77)
- Place of birth: Hamilton, Scotland
- Height: 5 ft 7 in (1.70 m)
- Position: Midfielder

Youth career
- Possilpark YMCA
- 1966–1968: West Ham United

Senior career*
Years	Team	Apps	(Gls)
1968–1971	West Ham United	39	(2)
1971–1974	Watford	65	(12)
1974–1975	Colchester United	45	(6)
1975–1977	Hereford United	79	(6)
1977–1981	Shrewsbury Town	86	(0)
Total		314	(26)
- * Club domestic league appearances and goals

James Young Lindsay (born 12 July 1949) is a Scottish former footballer who played in the Football League as a midfielder for West Ham United, Watford, Colchester United, Hereford United and Shrewsbury Town. He amassed over 300 Football League appearances in a career spanning 13 years, collecting two Third Division winners medals with Hereford and Shrewsbury in the process.

== Career ==
=== West Ham United ===
Born in Hamilton, Lindsay began his career with West Ham United in the Football League after joining from amateur club Possilpark YMCA in Scotland. He signed on professional terms with the club in summer 1966, initially as a striker, making his first-team debut coming on as a substitute in a 3–1 away defeat to Burnley on 8 October 1968. He found it difficult to break into the first-team, scoring his first goal ten months after he was handed his debut, in a 2–1 First Division defeat to Stoke City. In three years as a professional with the club, Lindsay scored twice in 39 league appearances, with his second and final goal for the Hammers coming on 31 January 1970 during a 3–2 defeat at Burnley, the club he made his debut against, and played his final game on 10 April 1971, a 1–0 defeat to Nottingham Forest.

=== Watford ===
Lindsay was signed by Watford for £20,000 from West Ham in May 1971. He scored 12 goals from midfield in 65 league games for the club between 1971 and 1974, making his debut in a Second Division 3–0 defeat away at Fulham. At the end of his first season with the club, Lindsay was placed on the transfer list with a valuation of £20,000, but remained with the club until he was released two years later. He played his final Watford game in a 1–0 FA Cup victory over Chelmsford City on 24 November 1973.

=== Colchester United ===
Colchester United signed Lindsay on a free transfer from Watford in July 1974. He was a regular figure in the first-team for Colchester during the 1974–75 season, his only season with the club, making 45 league appearances and scoring six goals. He made his debut for the U's on 17 August in a 1–1 draw with his former club Watford at Layer Road, and scored his first goal in the following game, a 1–0 League Cup win over Oxford United. He scored his final goal for the club on 22 April 1975 in a 2–0 win over Blackburn Rovers and made his final appearance in the final game of the season, a 3–2 home win against Bury. In the summer of 1975, he was sold to Hereford United for £15,000.

=== Hereford United ===
After making his debut on 16 August 1975 against Port Vale, Lindsay was ever-present during his first season with Hereford, scoring twice in 46 league appearances on the way to helping the club win the Third Division title. In total, he made 79 appearances and scored six goals in two seasons with the Bulls, but could not prevent the club from being relegated back to the Third Division in his second season. He made his final appearance for Hereford on 14 May 1977 against Leyton Orient.

=== Shrewsbury Town ===
Lindsay signed for Shrewsbury Town in August 1977 from Hereford and would make 86 appearances for the club, including helping the club finish first in the Third Division in the 1978–79 season.

== Personal life ==
Once he had retired from the game, Lindsay settled in Shrewsbury and now runs a pub in the town.

== Honours ==
Hereford United

- 1975–76 Football League Third Division winner (Level 3)

Shrewsbury Town

- 1978–79 Football League Third Division winner (Level 3)
- 1978-79 Welsh Cup winner

All honours referenced by:
