= Ken Burton (footballer) =

English footballer

Personal information
- Full name: Kenneth Owen Burton
- Date of birth: 11 February 1950 (age 76)
- Place of birth: Sheffield, England
- Height: 5 ft 7 1/2 in (1.71 m)
- Position: Defender

Senior career*
Years	Team	Apps	(Gls)
1968–1972	Sheffield Wednesday	57	(2)
1972–1973	→ Peterborough United (loan)	4	(0)
1973–1979	Chesterfield	237	(7)
1980–1981	Halifax Town	27	(1)
- Worksop Town
Total		325	(10)
- * Club domestic league appearances and goals

Kenneth Owen Burton (born 11 February 1950) is an English former footballer who played in the Football League for Chesterfield, Halifax Town, Peterborough United and Sheffield Wednesday.
