= Les Parodi =

English footballer

Personal information
- Date of birth: 1 April 1954 (age 72)
- Place of birth: London, England
- Position: Defender
1973–1975	Bournemouth	49	(2)
1975–	Oxford City		
1978	Seattle Sounders	21	(1)
1979	Columbus Magic		

Les Parodi (born 4 January 1954) is an English retired professional football defender.

In 1978, he moved to the US, where he signed with the Seattle Sounders of the North American Soccer League. In 1979, he played for the Columbus Magic in the American Soccer League.
