= Les Briley =

English footballer

Personal information
- Date of birth: 2 October 1956 (age 70)
- Place of birth: Lambeth, England
- Height: 5 ft 6 in (1.68 m)
- Position: Midfielder

Youth career
- Chelsea

Senior career*
Years	Team	Apps	(Gls)
1974–1976	Chelsea	0	(0)
1976–1978	Hereford United	61	(2)
1978–1980	Wimbledon	61	(2)
1980–1984	Aldershot	157	(11)
1984–1991	Millwall	227	(13)
1991–1992	Brighton & Hove Albion	15	(0)
1992–1994	Slough Town	60	(2)
Total		581	(30)
- * Club domestic league appearances and goals

Les Briley (born 2 October 1956 in Lambeth) is an English former footballer who played as a midfielder in the Football League for Hereford United, Wimbledon, Aldershot, Millwall and Brighton & Hove Albion. He began his career as an apprentice with Chelsea, without playing for the first team. He is Millwall's Assistant Youth Academy Manager.
