= Dave Rylands =

English footballer

Personal information
- Date of birth: 5 March 1953
- Place of birth: Liverpool, England
- Place of death: England
- Position: Defender

Senior career*
Years	Team	Apps	(Gls)
1970–1974	Liverpool	1	(0)
1982	St George	1	(0)
- * Club domestic league appearances and goals

Dave Rylands (born 5 March 1953) is an English former footballer who played as a defender. Rylands started his career at Liverpool signing professional terms with the club when he was 17 years old in 1970. Rylands only made one appearance for Liverpool; he played in their 2–2 draw against Doncaster Rovers in the 1973–74 FA Cup.
