= Billy Tucker =

English footballer

Personal information
- Full name: William John Tucker
- Date of birth: 17 May 1948 (age 78)
- Place of birth: Kidderminster, England
- Position: Defender

Senior career*
Years	Team	Apps	(Gls)
	Kidderminster Harriers	?	(?)
1970–1971	Evesham United	?	(?)
1971–1976	Hereford United	137	(12)
1976–1979	Bury	96	(8)
1979–1980	Swindon Town	35	(4)
1980–1981	Cheltenham Town	?	(?)
- * Club domestic league appearances and goals

William John Tucker (born 17 May 1948) is an English former professional footballer who played in the Football League, as a central defender.
