= Dudley Tyler =

English footballer (born 1944)

Personal information
- Date of birth: 21 September 1944 (age 82)
- Place of birth: Salisbury, England
- Position: Winger

Senior career*
Years	Team	Apps	(Gls)
1969–1972	Hereford United		
1972–1973	West Ham United	29	(1)
1973–1977	Hereford United	102	(10)
- Malvern Town
- Westfields
- Pegasus Juniors

Managerial career
- Malvern Town
- Westfields
- Pegasus Juniors
- * Club domestic league appearances and goals

Dudley Tyler (born 21 September 1944) is an English former footballer, born in Salisbury, who played as a winger in the Football League for West Ham United and Hereford United.

== Career ==
John Charles signed Tyler for Hereford United in 1969 from amateur football in Swindon; he had previously been rejected by several clubs due to him having a hole in his heart. He was part of the team that famously knocked Newcastle United out of the FA Cup, and gained election to the Football League in 1972. Tyler subsequently signed for West Ham United for a then non-league record fee of £25,000. He made just 29 league appearances in one-and-a-half seasons, his only league goal for the club scored against Peter Shilton. He returned to Hereford in November 1973, eventually reaching a total of 329 competitive appearances for the club with 69 goals scored.

After retiring from professional football, he joined non league Malvern Town, eventually becoming player-manager, followed by stints at Westfields and Pegasus Juniors in Hereford, both playing and managing. He worked as a salesman for a plastics company. As of 2016, Tyler still lived in Hereford.
