= Steve Davey =

English footballer

Personal information
- Full name: Stephen Gilbert Richard Davey
- Date of birth: 5 September 1948 (age 78)
- Place of birth: Plymouth, England
- Position: Defender

Youth career
- 1964–1966: Plymouth Argyle

Senior career*
Years	Team	Apps	(Gls)
1966–1975	Plymouth Argyle	224	(47)
1975–1978	Hereford United	107	(32)
1978–1981	Portsmouth	92	(8)
1981–1982	Exeter City	15	(0)
- Bideford
- Liskeard Athletic
- Saltash United
- St Blazey
Total		438	(87)
- * Club domestic league appearances and goals

Stephen Gilbert Richard Davey (born 5 September 1948 in Plymouth) is an English former footballer who played in the Football League for Plymouth Argyle, Hereford United, Portsmouth and Exeter City. For Plymouth he played either as a striker or at full back. He played a key role in Portsmouth's promotion from the Fourth Division in 1979–80, playing mainly at centre-back.

He played twice for England Youth in the summer of 1967, and later played for several non-league clubs in the south-west of England including Bideford, Liskeard Athletic, Saltash United and St Blazey.

He is now a commentator for BBC Radio Devon, co-commentating on Plymouth Argyle matches alongside Gordon Sparks.
