= Steve Ritchie (footballer) =

Scottish footballer

Stephen Ritchie
Personal information
- Full name: Stephen Kilcar Ritchie
- Date of birth: 17 February 1954 (age 72)
- Place of birth: Scotland
- Position: Forward

Youth career
- Bristol City

Senior career*
Years	Team	Apps	(Gls)
1971–1972	Bristol City	1	(0)
1972–1975	Greenock Morton	65	(3)
1975–1977	Hereford United	102	(3)
1978–1979	Aberdeen	10	(1)
1979–1980	Torquay United	58	(2)
1980–1983	Yeovil Town	?	(?)
1983–?	Trowbridge Town	?	(?)

International career
- Scotland Schools
- * Club domestic league appearances and goals

Stephen Kilcar Ritchie (born 17 February 1954) is a Scottish former footballer. Ritchie played as a forward for Bristol City, Greenock Morton, Hereford United, Aberdeen, Torquay United, and Yeovil Town. He is the brother of former Bristol City player Tom Ritchie.

== Club career ==
Ritchie joined Bristol City as an apprentice before signing as a professional in October 1971.

In 1972, he moved to Greenock Morton, where he made 65 league appearances and scored three goals.

In 1975, Ritchie signed for Hereford United, making 102 league appearances and scoring three goals.

In March 1978, Ritchie joined Aberdeen in a £10,000 transfer from Hereford. He scored a goal for Aberdeen in the 1978 Scottish Cup Final, but the team lost 2–1 to Rangers. His mis-hit shot deceived Rangers goalkeeper Peter McCloy.

After falling out of favour with Aberdeen manager Alex Ferguson, Ritchie was released on a free transfer. In March 1979, he joined Torquay United. He played 58 league matches and scored twice for Torquay.

In June 1980, Ritchie signed for Yeovil Town. He served as club captain during the 1982–83 season.

In the summer of 1983, Ritchie joined Trowbridge Town.
