= Terry Shanahan =

English footballer

Personal information
- Date of birth: 5 December 1951 (age 74)
- Place of birth: Paddington, England
- Height: 5 ft 10 in (1.78 m)
- Position: Forward

Youth career
- Tottenham Hotspur

Senior career*
Years	Team	Apps	(Gls)
1970–1971	Ipswich Town	4	(0)
1971	→ Blackburn Rovers (loan)	6	(2)
1971–1974	Halifax Town	96	(23)
1974–1976	Chesterfield	60	(28)
1976–1977	Millwall	20	(5)
1977–1978	Bournemouth	18	(1)
1978–1980	Aldershot	16	(4)
1980–1981	Phoenix Inferno		
Total		220	(63)
- * Club domestic league appearances and goals

Terence C. Shanahan (born 5 December 1951) is an English former professional footballer who played in the Football League, as a forward.

In 1980 he was contracted to play with ASL expansion team the Phoenix Fire, but the team folded in pre-season.
