= Roy Carter (footballer) =

English footballer

Personal information
- Full name: Roy William Carter
- Date of birth: 19 February 1954 (age 72)
- Place of birth: Torpoint, England
- Height: 6 ft 0 in (1.83 m)
- Position: Midfielder

Senior career*
Years	Team	Apps	(Gls)
1973–1975	Falmouth Town	?	(24)
1975–1977	Hereford United	71	(9)
1977–1983	Swindon Town	200	(34)
1982	→ Torquay United (loan)	6	(5)
1982	→ Bristol Rovers (loan)	4	(1)
1983	Torquay United	21	(3)
1983–1987	Newport County	152	(21)
1987–1988	Exeter City	41	(2)
1988–1990	Saltash United		
1990–1993	Bodmin Town		
1993–1997	Torpoint Athletic		
- * Club domestic league appearances and goals

Roy William Carter (born 19 February 1954 in Torpoint) is a former professional footballer.

Carter played for Falmouth Town, and he then joined Hereford United in April 1975. He made his league debut the same season and went on to play 71 league games, scoring 9 times.

He transferred to Swindon Town for a £22,000 fee in December 1977 and he went on to make 236 senior appearances for the club, scoring 39 goals. After loan spells with Torquay United and Bristol Rovers he moved permanently to Torquay in February 1983.

He later joined Newport County and played 152 league games, scoring 21 times before moving to Exeter City. He stayed only one season at St. James' Park before leaving league football and joining Saltash United.
