= Steve Emery =

English footballer (born 1956)

Personal information
- Full name: Stephen Roger Emery
- Date of birth: 7 February 1956 (age 70)
- Place of birth: Ledbury, England
- Height: 5 ft 10 in (1.78 m)
- Position: Midfielder

Youth career
- 1972–1974: Hereford United

Senior career*
Years	Team	Apps	(Gls)
1974–1979	Hereford United	204	(10)
1979–1983	Derby County	75	(4)
1983	Newport County	0	(0)
1983–1985	Hereford United	75	(2)
1985–1986	Wrexham	9	(0)
–	Gloucester City		
–	Westfields		

Managerial career
- –: Westfields (player-manager)
- –: Ledbury Town
- 2008–2009: Ledbury Town
- * Club domestic league appearances and goals

Stephen Roger Emery (born 7 February 1956) is an English former footballer who played for 13 seasons in the Football League. He spent much of his career at Hereford United, where he made 333 competitive appearances, and also played League football for Derby County and Wrexham.

He was a versatile midfield player and started his career at Hereford when he became the club's first apprentice professional, signing just before his 18th birthday. Initially he spent seven seasons at Edgar Street and was a first team regular as Hereford rose to the Second Division and during their decline back down to the Fourth. In 1979, he was sold to Derby County for £100,000, making the step up to the First Division.

After three seasons, and a brief spell at Newport County, he returned to Hereford in 1983 before moving to Wrexham. He finished his career in non-league football with Gloucester City and Westfields, where he was player-manager while also working in the licensed trade. He also managed Ledbury Town for nearly five years, and returned as manager in late 2008, but was dismissed after only three months.

His son Josh Emery had a spell playing for Hereford.
