= Peter Spiring =

English footballer

Personal information
- Full name: Peter John Spiring
- Date of birth: 13 December 1950 (age 75)
- Place of birth: Glastonbury, England
- Position: Winger

Youth career
- Bristol City

Senior career*
Years	Team	Apps	(Gls)
1968–1973	Bristol City	63	(16)
1971	→ Washington Darts (loan)	4	(0)
1973–1974	Liverpool	0	(0)
1974–1976	Luton Town	15	(2)
1976–1983	Hereford United	227	(20)
- * Club domestic league appearances and goals

Peter Spiring (born 13 December 1950) is an English former footballer who played in the Football League playing as a winger for Bristol City, Luton Town and Hereford United, and in the North American Soccer League (NASL) for Washington Darts.

Spiring started his career at Bristol City before being sold to Liverpool for £60,000 in March 1973. He did not play a first team match at Anfield, only featuring on the bench twice, and was later sold to Luton Town for £70,000. He went on to spend eight seasons at Hereford United.

Spiring's son Reuben played first-class cricket for Worcestershire.
