= Tommy Hughes (footballer, born 1947) =

Scottish footballer

Personal information
- Full name: Thomas Alexander Hughes
- Date of birth: 11 July 1947 (age 79)
- Place of birth: Dalmuir, Scotland
- Position: Goalkeeper

Senior career*
Years	Team	Apps	(Gls)
- Clydebank
1966–1971	Chelsea	11	(0)
1971–1973	Aston Villa	16	(0)
1973	→ Brighton & Hove Albion (loan)	3	(0)
1973–1982	Hereford United	240	(0)
1982	Trowbridge Town		
Total		270	(0)

International career
1969–1970	Scotland under-23	2	(0)

Managerial career
- 1982–1983: Hereford United
- * Club domestic league appearances and goals

Thomas Alexander Hughes (born 11 July 1947) is a Scottish former footballer who played as a goalkeeper.

Hughes started out with semi-professional side Clydebank before joining Chelsea in 1966. However, he was always understudy to Peter Bonetti whilst with the west London side, meaning he made just 11 appearances in four years. Hughes won two Scottish under-23 caps while at Chelsea.

Hughes was transferred to Aston Villa for £12,500 in May 1971. Hughes played sixteen times for Aston Villa in 1971–72, when Villa just pipped Brighton & Hove Albion for the Third Division championship. Hughes then lost his place at Aston Villa to Jim Cumbes. He went on loan to Brighton for a month in February 1973 when Brighton were struggling at the bottom of the Second Division. Hughes played three games for Brighton, whose manager Pat Saward was keen to sign him as permanently.

Brighton could not match the asking price, and Hughes was transferred to Hereford United in August 1973 for £15,000. He spent nine seasons with Hereford United, and was a part of the side which won the Third Division championship in 1975–76. He was later caretaker manager of the club during the 1982–83 season.
