= John Layton =

English footballer and manager

Personal information
- Full name: John Henry Layton
- Date of birth: 29 June 1951 (age 75)
- Place of birth: Hereford, England
- Position: Centre-back

Youth career
- Hereford United
- Westfields

Senior career*
| Years | Team | Apps | (Gls) |
| 1970–1973 | Gloucester City | 38 | (0) |
| 1973–1974 | Kidderminster Harriers | | |
| 1974–1980 | Hereford United | 200 | (13) |
| 1980–1983 | Gloucester City | 65 | (1) |
| 1983 | Trowbridge Town | | |
| 1984 | Newport County | 1 | (0) |

Managerial career
- 1985–1988: Gloucester City
- 1988–1994: Hereford United (youth coach)
- 1994: Hereford United (assistant)
- 1994–1995: Hereford United
- 1999–2002: Pakistan Youth
- 2001–2002: Pakistan
- 2002–2003: Hurriyya SC
- 2004–2004: Lower Hutt City AFC
- 2008–2009: Westfields
- 2010–2012: Hereford United (youth coach)
- * Club domestic league appearances and goals

John Henry Layton (born 29 June 1951) is an English former football player and coach who spent much of his career at Hereford United, both as a player and a manager. He played as a centre back. He made over 200 league appearances for Hereford United and helped them to the Third Division championship 1975-76.

== Early life ==
Layton was born in Hereford on 29 June 1951. His dad, Johnny Layton, was a notable figure at Hereford United, being the club's record appearance holder during the 1950s and 1960s with 549 appearances. His father played as a part time professional, with his main occupation being in the timber trade.

He used to attend his father games until his retirement, when he became manager of the reserve side.

== Playing career ==
=== Early years ===
Layton played occasionally in the youth of Hereford United and Westfields, until joining Gloucester City in 1970. He moved to Kidderminster Harriers in 1973.

=== Hereford United ===
Layton returned to Hereford and made his debut with the first team on 27 August 1974 at the Gay Meadow stadium against Shrewsbury in the League Cup, as a replacement for the injured Billy Tucker, winning the match by 1-0. He then joined the first team squad as a part time player, while maintaining his job as a builder.

He was present at the golden era of Hereford United from the late 1960s to 1976, where Hereford United had risen from the lower divisions to the Division Two, playing against the likes of George Best and Bobby Moore at Fulham and Laurie Cunningham at Leyton Orient.

=== Later years ===
Layton left Hereford United at August 1980 and joined Gloucester City again and had stints at Trowbridge and Newport County.

== Managerial career ==
After his retirement, Layton joined Gloucester City as a youth team coach, and returned to Hereford United in 1988 as the head of youth football when Ian Bowyer was in charge. In the summer of 1994, Layton became assistant manager under Greg Downs. When Downs was dismissed, Layton took the caretaker charge during the 1994−95 Football League Third Division season. He was appointed as permanent manager till the end of the season with Dick Bate as his assistant until Graham Turner took his role.

Between 1999 and 2002, Layton managed in Pakistan, including a stint as coach of the Pakistan national team. He spent his spell in Pakistan identifying and developing young players including Muhammad Essa and Jaffar Khan early in their age. Under Layton, Pakistan Under-19 and Under-17 qualified for Asian championship main rounds for the first time in the history. Under his guidance the senior team secured the first-ever point and scored first goal at the World Cup qualifiers since their first participation in 1989 that helped Pakistan rise from 195th to 182nd in the FIFA ranking. He left after the Pakistan Football Federation decided against renewing his three-year contract following the suspension of AFC aid in early 2002.

After leaving Pakistan, he had a stint with Hurriyya SC in the Maldives League before going to United States to help a friend at a coaching academy.

He joined Lower Hutt City AFC in New Zealand before returning to the U.K., where he worked with the English F.A and presented their F.A Level 1 and Level 2 courses.

He returned to Hereford United in 2011 as head of youth development, but left when Martin Foyle came in a year later. Layton was involved in the early development of Jarrod Bowen.
