= Dixie McNeil =

English footballer and manager

Personal information
- Full name: Richard McNeil
- Date of birth: 16 January 1947 (age 79)
- Place of birth: Melton Mowbray, England
- Position: Striker

Senior career*
Years	Team	Apps	(Gls)
????–1964	Holwell Works	?	(?)
1964–1966	Leicester City	0	(0)
1966–1967	Exeter City	31	(11)
1967–1969	Corby Town	0	(0)
1969–1972	Northampton Town	86	(33)
1972–1974	Lincoln City	97	(53)
1974–1977	Hereford United	129	(85)
1977–1982	Wrexham	167	(54)
1982–1983	Hereford United	12	(3)
- Chirk AAA
Total		522	(239)

Managerial career
- 1985–1989: Wrexham
- 1990–1991: Coventry City (assistant)
- 1991–1992: Hereford United (assistant)
- 1994–1995: Flint Town United
- 1999–2000: Caernarfon Town
- 2004–2007: NEWI Cefn Druids
- * Club domestic league appearances and goals

Richard "Dixie" McNeil (born 16 January 1947) is an English former footballer and manager, who played as a striker.

On 4 December 2019, he joined Wrexham's board of directors and will retain his honorary position of club president.

== Playing career ==
As a schoolboy, McNeil signed for Leicester City after playing for the local club Holwell Works, but he was released without playing for the first team. He made his Football League debut for Exeter City in the 1966-67 season against Wrexham, a club he would later play for and manage. Despite scoring in one-third of the matches he played, he was released at the end of the season, and dropped down to the Southern League with Corby Town, who were relegated in McNeil's first season. Northampton Town then bought him for £5,000 in May 1969.

McNeil spent two and a half seasons at Northampton, scoring in the FA Cup match against Manchester United in which George Best scored six times. He then joined fellow Fourth Division side Lincoln City. He would be the top scorer at a club for the next five seasons, twice at Lincoln and three times at Hereford United after a £15,000 transfer. He helped Hereford achieve promotion to the Second Division of English football in 1975-76. He was also the top goalscorer of the top four divisions of English football that season. Hereford finished bottom of the Second Division the following season despite McNeil scoring nearly a goal every other game.

In 1977, McNeil moved to Wrexham for £60,000. He scored the equaliser at the Racecourse Ground against Blyth Spartans, which took the club to an FA Cup replay at St James' Park, where he scored the winning goal. He retired from professional football in 1983 but played on in the Welsh National League with Chirk AAA, and made an appearance in the FA Cup in 1985, at the age of 38.

== Management career ==
McNeil became Wrexham manager in 1985 winning the Welsh Cup and qualifying for the European Cup Winners' Cup in his first season.

After a spell as assistant manager at Coventry City, McNeil became a sales representative with Marston's Brewery, as well as reporting on Wrexham's games for local radio. In November 1993 he returned to football management as manager of League of Wales side Flint Town United, leading them from near relegation certainties to finish the season in fourth position. He was awarded a testimonial by Wrexham, against Kevin Keegan's Premier League side, Newcastle United in 1994.

McNeil returned to management in January 2000 as manager of struggling League of Wales side Caernarfon Town. His first win with Caernarfon was to beat Swansea City in the FAW Premier Cup quarter-final. He later became manager of another League of Wales club, Cefn Druids.
