= Hereford United F.C. =

Former association football club in Hereford, England

Hereford United
- Nickname: The Bulls
- Founded: 1924; 102 years ago
- Dissolved: 19 December 2014; 11 years ago
- Ground: Edgar Street
- Capacity: 5,250
Home colours	Away colours

Hereford United Football Club was an association football club based in Hereford, England. They played at Edgar Street for their entire history. They were nicknamed 'The Whites' or 'The Lilywhites', after their predominantly white kit, or 'The Bulls' after the Hereford cattle breed. They contested A49 derby games with Shrewsbury Town.

Founded in 1924, the club entered the Birmingham Combination and switched to the Birmingham & District League four years later. They entered the Southern League after World War II, winning the North-West Division in 1958–59 and Division One in 1964–65. Hereford achieved national prominence in 1972 when they knocked top-flight Newcastle United out of the FA Cup and were elected into the Football League later that year. Promoted out of the Fourth Division in 1972–73, they won the Third Division title in 1975–76, though lasted just one season in the Second Division and were relegated again the following year.

Hereford spent 19 seasons in the fourth tier before losing their Football League status with a last-place finish in 1997. They remained in the Conference for nine seasons under the stewardship of Graham Turner, finishing second three consecutive times before winning promotion after winning the 2006 play-off final. Promoted out of League Two in 2007–08, they were relegated the following season and were again relegated into non-League football in 2012. On 19 December 2014, the club was wound up in the High Court with debts around £1.3 million.

Chart of Hereford United's league performance after their election into the Football League.

Following the demise of United, a new 'phoenix club' was set up, Hereford. The new club incorporates the words 'Forever United' into its crest design, as well as the iconic Hereford Bull, and gained promotion to the National League North in 2018.

== History ==
Hereford United Football Club was founded in 1924 with the merger of two local clubs St Martins and RAOC (Rotherwas), with the intention of sustaining a higher class of football in the city of Hereford. Hereford joined the Birmingham Combination and lost its first match 3-2 to Atherstone United. The club's second ever match was an FA Cup preliminary round tie against future rivals Kidderminster Harriers which they lost 7–2.

Hereford progressed to the Birmingham & District League in 1928 where the club spent 11 seasons, with a best position of 4th. By the late 1930s the number of clubs in the league had decreased and Hereford successfully applied to join the Southern League – but played only a few games in this league before the outbreak of the Second World War. At the same time the club became a limited company.

When football resumed after the war, Hereford finished 1st in their first full season in the league only to be demoted to 2nd behind Chelmsford City, which was awarded points for unplayed matches. In 27 seasons in the Southern League, Hereford finished as runners-up three times, and also lifted the Southern League Cup three times. When the league was regionalised for one season in 1958–59, Hereford also won their regional division to add to their third League Cup win.

In 1966, Hereford signed John Charles, the former Leeds United, Juventus and Welsh international, boosting the support of the club. He became manager a year later and set about building a team to challenge at the top of the Southern League and gain election to the Football League. With the club becoming one of the best-supported non-league clubs in the country Charles used his standing within the game to canvass votes from member clubs for election to the Football League.

The 1971–72 season saw the club finish second in the Southern League and gain national prominence due to its exploits in the FA Cup. Charles had departed the club in October 1971 and his successor Colin Addison inherited a side that defeated top-flight Newcastle United in the FA Cup. The star player was Dudley Tyler; Ronnie Radford and Ricky George's goals earned the club a Fourth Round tie against West Ham United where they were defeated in a replay at Upton Park. The Cup run played a part in the club's successful election to the Fourth Division, replacing Barrow.

The club rose rapidly to the Second Division after finishing runners-up in their first season in the Fourth Division and winning the Third Division title in 1976. Dixie McNeil was the leading goalscorer in the top four divisions of English football in the same season, but Hereford spent only one season in the second tier before dropping back into the Fourth Division. The club's peak was in October 1976 when they were in sixth position before playing Brian Clough's Nottingham Forest, losing 4–3 at the City Ground.

After this period of success the club spent 19 years in the bottom division, suffering financial problems in the early 1980s which resurfaced in the mid-1990s. The club enjoyed brief glimpses of their past success in the Cup competitions, holding Arsenal to a 1–1 draw in the FA Cup of 1985 and narrowly losing 1–0 to Manchester United in the FA Cup of 1990. The club's first trophy for 14 years was the Welsh Cup won in the same season. In the league the club usually finished in the bottom half as it went through a succession of managers, finishing 17th in 4 consecutive seasons.

Graham Turner was appointed manager for the beginning of the 1995–96 season and managed to lead the team to sixth place and the play-offs, despite the club being in 17th position two months previously. This resurgence was in part thanks to the goals of Steve White who emulated Dixie McNeil by being the leading goalscorer in the top four divisions. Hereford lost to Darlington in the play-offs and, with financial problems worsening, the club lost key players for the following 1996–1997 season. After a terrible run of form Hereford were ultimately relegated after a relegation-decider at Edgar Street with Brighton & Hove Albion.

In 1998, Turner purchased a majority shareholding from Peter Hill and Robin Fry. The club was in serious financial difficulties, with debts of £1 million owed to a property development company which also controlled the leases on the stadium. Turner purchased only two players between 1997 and 2008 for a combined total of £40,000.

The club's first five seasons in the Conference saw little success on the pitch, with the club being forced to sell many of its key players and the future of Edgar Street in serious doubt. The 2001–02 FA Cup saw the club receive a financial bonus when the BBC televised the First Round match against Wrexham live. Turner stated that the money was critical to the club's survival and therefore Gavin Williams's goal against Dover Athletic in the previous round is seen as the goal that saved the club.

Having reached a 40-year low of 17th in the Conference, the summer of 2002 proved a turning point as almost the entire squad was changed, the majority of new signings having been released from Football League clubs as a result of the ITV Digital collapse. The new squad transformed the club into title contenders which, after a record-breaking season in the 2003–04 season, finished as runners up in the Conference but failed in the play-offs. 2004–05 saw an identical outcome but in 2005–06 Hereford were promoted after defeating Halifax Town in the play-off final.

The club returned to the Football League with a vastly improved financial situation. Under Turner the club was now strictly living within its financial means, having turned a sizeable profit in the latter Conference seasons whilst spending just £20,000 on transfers. In addition the team was playing attractive football which had earned them the mantle of "the best footballing side in the Conference".

In 2006–07, Hereford achieved victories over five of the top eight finishing clubs, but a poor run of form in the last part of the season dropped the club into 16th position. In the 2007–08 season the club were never out of the top five from November onwards and consistently placed in the automatic promotion places. Despite strong competition from Stockport County, Hereford secured third place and promotion with a match to spare by defeating Brentford 3–0 at Griffin Park, though they were tipped to struggle in League One.,

2008–09 saw the club play in the third tier of English football for the first time since 1978. They rarely placed outside the relegation zone throughout the season, and achieved only 17 points at the halfway point. A 5–0 home win over Oldham Athletic was a rare good result, with top scorer Steve Guinan scoring a hat-trick. Hereford's relegation was confirmed on 18 April 2009, after they recorded 1 win and 11 defeats in a 12 match spell. Turner subsequently stepped down as manager, paving the way for John Trewick to become manager. However, Trewick did not last a full season after a disappointing campaign and was dismissed on 8 March 2010; and Turner once again took over first team duties on a temporary basis.

David Keyte was announced as the new club chairman on 4 June 2010 with Tim Russon as the new vice-chairman. They appointed Simon Davey as manager on 22 June 2010. Davey was sacked on 4 October 2010 after poor league form. He was succeeded by physio Jamie Pitman who acted as caretaker manager until he was made manager on a full-time basis until the end of the 2010–11 season.

Hereford were further relegated to the Conference from League Two at the end of the 2011–12 season.

Hereford were expelled from the Conference on 10 June 2014 due to financial irregularities. It was revealed a week later that the club's debts could total as much as £1.3 million. The club was accepted into the Southern League Premier Division for the 2014–15 season on 19 June 2014. However, financial worries continued, including a winding-up petition started by Martin Foyle, who resigned as manager in March 2014. Hearings of the winding-up petition were adjourned a number of times, including on 7 July 2014. A number of other creditors attached themselves to the Foyle petition, including Andy Porter, former assistant manager, and HMRC. A CVA was proposed by the board of directors of the company, but was rejected by creditors. Many Hereford fans chose to boycott the club due to clashes between fans and the board.

On 10 December 2014, after failing to fully and properly comply with obligations to respond to questions coming from an Independent Regulatory Commission, the FA suspended Hereford United from all forms of football activity with immediate effect, until the order of the Independent Regulatory Commission was complied with to the full satisfaction of the commission. Hereford United's suspension from all football activity was lifted by the Football Association the following day, after chairman and new majority shareholder Andy Lonsdale confirmed the FA received the necessary documentation – including the transfer of shares in the club to Lonsdale. The club was wound-up in the High Court in December 2014.

== Colours and badge ==
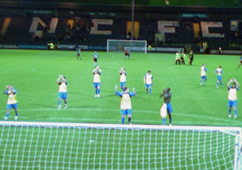
Hereford players sporting the away kit at Notts County

Hereford originally played in an all-white strip, but their traditional colours are white shirts and black shorts. This dates back to the end of the Second World War when they used material from blackout curtains to make shorts when they ran out of white material. However, they occasionally reverted to an all-white strip, latterly in the 2004–05 and 2005–06 seasons. Their away colours varied over the years, with predominantly yellow colours being used in later years.

Prior to 1971 the club played in plain shirts with no crest. A depiction of a Herefordshire bull was introduced for the 1971–72 season with H.U.F.C. lettering underneath. A supporters' club crest was also used during the 1970s. The shirt crest design changed several times over the years, with the full club name being added above and below the bull, which remained largely untouched. The current crest was introduced in the early 1990s but was not featured on the shirts until 2003.

Hereford's shirt sponsors were Sun Valley Poultry between 1991 and 2009, the biggest employer in Hereford. A new three-year sponsorship deal was agreed in May 2007 which extended the sponsorship to 19 years, one of the longest in British football history. The logo of Cargill, Sun Valley's parent company, appeared on the shirts from the 2009–10 season onwards. Hereford's shirt and kit suppliers were M and M Direct, another large employer in Herefordshire, which supported the club for many years. For the 2009–10 season, the kit was manufactured by Admiral. In the 2014–15 season Cargill ended sponsorship because of concerns over the financial running of the club. From August 2014 the club had no sponsors with many pulling out in the summer of 2014 due to the club's financial running and future viability.

== Stadium ==
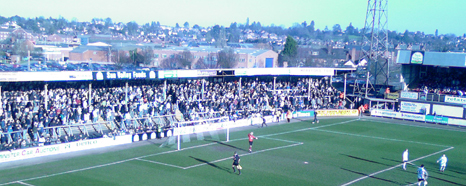
The Meadow End, February 2007

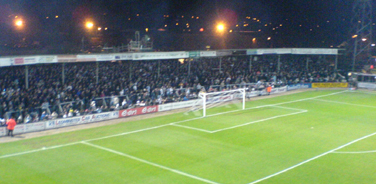
The Meadow End, November 2007

Hereford United played their home matches at Edgar Street from their formation in 1924; the ground was previously used by the amateur club Hereford City as well as for athletics. In later years the ground was central to Hereford's financial troubles, with the previous owners of the club handing the leases over to a development company from which they had borrowed £1 million. During the club's early years in the Conference the future of the ground was in doubt, and relocation was considered to the point that plans for a new 7,500 seater stadium were drawn up. A joint venture agreement was made between the club and the developers to redevelop both ends of the ground to include leisure facilities that would enable the debt to be settled. The area around the ground is subject to a substantial redevelopment plan, known as the Edgar Street Grid (ESG). The club and the developers were originally looking to submit redevelopment plans to the council by the end of 2007. Although the ground redevelopment is independent of the ESG, plans for the building of a cinema at the Blackfriars End drawn up by the club and developers were not supported by ESG and Herefordshire Council. Several months later, plans for the ESG itself were published which included a cinema.

The ground itself changed little since the mid-1970s and was largely outdated and in need of urgent redevelopment, with the Blackfriars End failing a safety inspection in July 2009. The terraced end had fallen into a state of disrepair in recent years which steadily reduced the stadium capacity from nearly 9,000 to reportedly 7,100, although the capacity was officially confirmed as 7,700 in November 2007. Improvements were made in later years to ensure the ground met Football League standards; including new floodlights, dressing rooms and barriers on the terraces. The pitch itself was also completely relaid for the 2007–08 season, with a new sprinkler system installed for the 2008–09 season. In 2013, the club said the capacity of Edgar Street was 5,966, but in 2014, the club only had a safety certificate to allow 1,000 spectators.

== Support ==
Hereford United was historically one of the best-supported clubs in non-league football, particularly in the last two seasons before their election to the Football League. Indeed, in their campaign for election they produced a newsletter which highlighted the fact that their average attendance (5,224) was higher than those of eight Third Division clubs and 15 Fourth Division clubs. Approximately 10,000 Hereford supporters attended the Conference play-off final.

The club's official programme was Bullseye and there was also a fanzine called Talking Bull until the 2008–09 season, when it was changed to an online format.

=== Home attendances ===
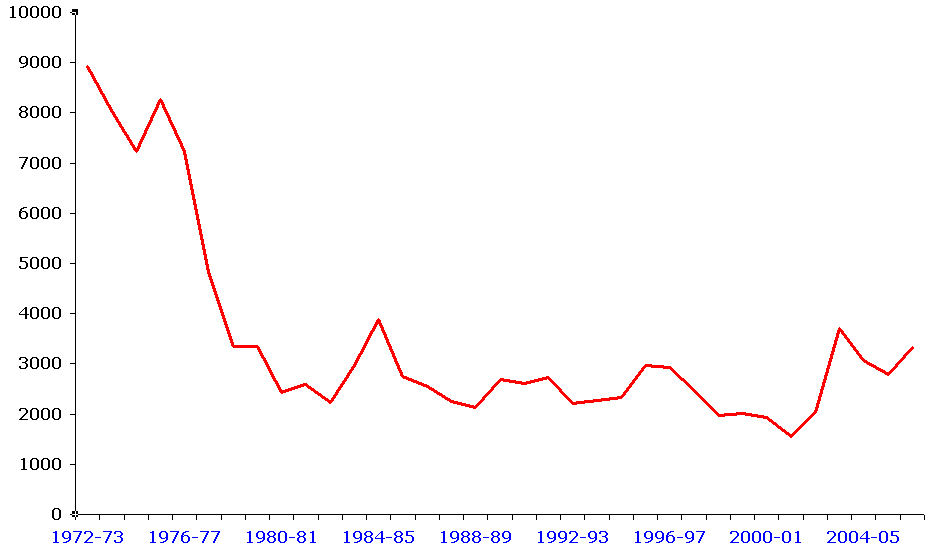
Average attendances

Between 1972 and 1977, during the club's rise to the Second Division, home attendances averaged almost 8,000 per game. The support fell during the 1980s with the average home attendance under 3,000, the exception being the 1984–85 season when the club finished fifth.

It was not until the latter Conference years that attendances improved, with the 2003–04 season seeing the average home attendance rise to 3,704. The following season saw the figure drop to just over 3,000 while in the 2005–06 season, despite the club successfully gaining promotion, the figure was 2,791. For the 2006–07 season the club had an average home league attendance of 3,327. With the exception of 2003–04, this is the highest average attendance since the 1984–85 season (3,881).

The club rarely enjoyed capacity crowds at Edgar Street in its later years, last seeing a five-figure home attendance in 1990. After the reduction of the Edgar Street capacity in line with the Taylor Report the highest home attendance was 8,953 in 1994 – a Coca-Cola Cup second-round match against Nottingham Forest. The highest league home attendance was 8,532, which was the relegation decider against Brighton & Hove Albion in 1997.

Following the takeover by Tommy Agombar, following the conclusion of the 2013–2014 season, Hereford's supporters trust voted to boycott United's fixtures and subsequently attendances dropped from around 2000 in the 2013–2014 season, to around 200–400 during the opening exchanges of the 2014–2015 Southern League.

=== Club anthem ===
The club's official anthem was Hereford United (We All Love You) which was written and performed by Danny Lee, a notable supporter of the club. Originally recorded and released in 1972, the same year as the famous FA Cup run, a rendition was usually sung at every Hereford match both home and away. The song was remixed three times: in 1979, 2002 and 2006. It was covered and released as a fundraising single, by local band King Mantis in 2013.

=== Rivals ===
Hereford had a number of rivalries with other clubs throughout their history. In the club's Southern League era Worcester City were considered their fiercest rivals. Both Cardiff City and Newport County were considered rivals in the 1970s and 1980s.

The derby against Shrewsbury Town, known as the A49 derby, after the road separating the two towns, was listed nineteenth in The Daily Telegraph's twenty fiercest rivalries in English football. However, since Hereford's resurrection the two sides have never met.

In the recent Football League era since promotion from the Conference, the club's rivals included Kidderminster Harriers, Cheltenham Town, and Forest Green Rovers.

== Managers ==
Graham Turner was the longest serving Hereford United manager and was also second to Sir Alex Ferguson as the longest serving manager in the English football league, having completed almost 14 seasons at the club.

The statistics of Hereford United's four most successful managers from the 1972–73 season onwards are shown below. Statistics include league matches only and are correct as of 7 May 2011.

Manager	Period in charge	English football levels contested	Record						
Manager	Period in charge	English football levels contested	P	W	D	L	Win %	Draw %	Loss %
Graham Turner	1995–2009, 2010	Level 3 (1 season); Level 4 (4 seasons); Level 5 (9 seasons)	606	246	159	201	40.59	26.24	33.17
John Newman	1983–1987	Level 4 (4.5 seasons)	206	77	50	79	37.38	24.27	38.35
John Sillett	1974–1978, 1991–1992	Level 2 (1 season); Level 3 (2.5 seasons); Level 4 (1 season)	204	67	58	79	32.84	28.43	38.73
Colin Addison	(1971)–1974, 1990–1991	Level 3 (1 season); Level 4 (1 season)	138	50	41	47	36.23	29.71	34.06

== Notable players ==
A number of full internationals played for Hereford in its 90-year history, although Brian Evans was the only player to be capped whilst at the club. Gavin McCallum came on for Canada on 29 May 2010 against Venezuela in a friendly and scored a late equaliser becoming the second Hereford United player to be capped and the first to score whilst at the club.

- (Albania) Astrit Ajdarević
- (Antigua and Barbuda) James Walker
- (Antigua and Barbuda) Moses Ashikodi
- (Antigua and Barbuda) Marvin McCoy
- (Bermuda) Meshach Wade
- (Bermuda) Kentoine Jennings
- (Canada) Gavin McCallum
- (Cape Verde) Jose Veiga
- (England) Jarrod Bowen
- (England) John Snape
- (England) Gary Hooper
- (England) Mike Bailey
- (England) Ken Brown
- (England) Steve Bull
- (England) William Churcher
- (England) Sam Clucas
- (England) Andy Todd
- (England) Edwin Holliday
- (England) David Icke
- (England) Joe Johnson
- (England) Eric Keen
- (England) Terry Paine
- (England) Bill Perry
- (England) Rob Purdie
- (England) Peter Spiring
- (England) Roy Williams
- (Finland) Mika Kottila
- (France) Bruno Ngotty
- (The Gambia) Edrissa Sonko
- (Grenada) Delroy Facey
- (Hungary) Péter Gulácsi
- (Republic of Ireland) Stephen Gleeson
- (Republic of Ireland) Jimmy Higgins
- (Republic of Ireland) Darren Randolph
- (Republic of Ireland) Kevin Sheedy
- (Jamaica) Trevor Benjamin
- (Jamaica) Theo Robinson
- (Jamaica) O'Neil Thompson
- (Kenya) Eric Odhiambo
- (Martinique) Yoann Arquin
- (Montserrat) Wayne Dyer
- (Montserrat) Lyle Taylor
- (New Zealand) James Musa
- (Nigeria) Ade Akinbiyi
- (Northern Ireland) Tony Capaldi
- (Northern Ireland) Robbie Dennison
- (Northern Ireland) Michael Ingham
- (Northern Ireland) Matty Lund
- (Poland) Adam Musiał
- (Saint Kitts and Nevis) Febian Brandy
- (Scotland) Jim Blyth
- (Scotland) Jonathan Gould
- (Scotland) Michael McIndoe
- (Wales) Bryn Allen
- (Wales) John Charles
- (Wales) Ray Daniel
- (Wales) Nick Deacy
- (Wales) Brian Evans
- (Wales) Roy Evans
- (Wales) Roger Freestone
- (Wales) Ryan Green
- (Wales) Ron Hewitt
- (Wales) Billy Hughes
- (Wales) Steve Lowndes
- (Wales) Paul Parry
- (Wales) Derek Showers
- (Wales) Derek Sullivan
- (Wales) Dai Thomas
- (Wales) Nigel Vaughan
- (Wales) Marley Watkins
- (Wales) Gavin Williams

== Records ==
After their solitary season in the old Second Division in 1976–77, the club became the first old Third Division champions to finish bottom the following season. Hereford were also the last English club (not counting The New Saints, who play in the Welsh football league system despite being based in England) to have won the Welsh Cup, which they did so in 1989–90.

John Layton Sr. holds the record for competitive appearances for the club, making 549 appearances between 1946 and 1964. In recent times the only player to come close to breaking this record was Mel Pejic who had made 523 appearances before his departure in 1992. Pejic made a record 412 Football League appearances for the club.

Charlie Thompson holds the record for goals scored for the club, scoring 184 in all competitions between 1945 and 1958. Roy Williams is the second highest goalscorer in the club's history, scoring 154 goals in 357 appearances over two spells between 1947 and 1963. In recent times Stewart Phillips is the only player to even approach this total with 124. His total of 95 goals in the Football League is a club record.

The sale of Lionel Ainsworth is set to break the club's transfer record of £440,000, dependent on the fortunes of Watford.

== Honours ==
League

- Third Division (level 3)
  - Champions: 1975–76
- Fourth Division (level 4)
  - Runners-up: 1972–73
- Conference (level 5)
  - Runners-up: 2003–04, 2004–05, 2005–06
- Southern League
  - Runners-up: 1945–46, 1950–51, 1971–72

Cup

- Welsh Cup
  - Winners: 1989–90
- Southern League Cup
  - Winners: 1951–52, 1956–57, 1958–59
