= Llewellyn (surname) =

Llewellyn is a surname, and may refer to:

== A ==
- Adam Llewellyn (born 1989), Welsh animator, writer and director
- Andy Llewellyn (born 1966), English footballer
- Anthony Llewellyn (1933–2013), American chemist

== B ==
- Bert Llewellyn (1939–2016), English footballer
- Brenna Llewellyn (born 1994), Canadian actress

== C ==
- Carl Llewellyn (born 1965), Welsh jockey and racehorse trainer
- Caro Llewellyn (born 1965), Australian business executive and writer, daughter of Kate Llewellyn
- Charlie Llewellyn (1876–1964), South African cricketer
- Chris Llewellyn (born 1979), Welsh footballer and coach
- Chris Llewellyn (poet), American poet
- Clem Llewellyn (1895–1969), American baseball player, lawyer and judge
- Clive Llewellyn (born 1953), Canadian wrestler and lawyer

== D ==
- David Llewellyn (academic administrator) (born 1960), Vice-Chancellor of Harper Adams University
- David Llewellyn (Australian politician) (born 1942), member of the Parliament of Tasmania
- David Llewellyn (author) (born 1978), Welsh novelist
- David Llewellyn (British politician) (1916–1992), British Member of Parliament
- David Llewellyn (golfer) (born 1951), Welsh golfer
- David Llewellyn (rugby union) (born 1970), Wales rugby union footballer
- David Llewellyn (trade unionist) (1907–1981), Welsh trade unionist and political activist
- Sir David Llewellyn, 1st Baronet (1879–1940), Welsh industrialist and financier
- Dai Llewellyn (Sir David Llewellyn, 4th Baronet) (1946–2009), Welsh socialite
- David Herbert Llewellyn (died 1864), doctor who went down with the CSS Alabama
- David Llewellyn (footballer) (born 1949), Welsh footballer
- Don Llewellyn (1919–2004), English chemist and founding vice-chancellor of University of Waikato
- Dorien Llewellyn (born 1996), Canadian water skier
- Dylan Llewellyn (born 1992), English actor

== E ==
- Edward Llewellyn (trumpeter) (1879–1936), American trumpeter, cornetist and composer
- Edward Llewellyn, Baron Llewellyn of Steep (born 1965), British diplomat
- Edward Llewellyn-Thomas (1917–1984), English scientist, professor and (under Edward Llewellyn) science-fiction author
- Elizabeth Llewellyn (born 1974), English opera singer
- Ensley Llewellyn (1905–1989), American military officer
- Ernest Llewellyn (1915–1982), Australian violinist and conductor
- Evan Henry Llewellyn (1847–1914), British army officer and politician

== F ==
- Fewlass Llewellyn (1866–1941), English actor, playwright and producer
- Frederick B. Llewellyn (1897–1971), American electrical engineer

== G ==
- Gareth Llewellyn (born 1969), Welsh rugby union footballer
- Glyn Llewellyn (born 1965), Welsh rugby union footballer
- Grace Llewellyn (born 1964), American author of books on homeschooling
- Grant Llewellyn (born 1960), Welsh conductor
- Gwynfor Llewellyn (born 1958), Welsh television editor

== H ==
- Harry Llewellyn (1911–1999), British equestrian

== J ==
- J. Bruce Llewellyn (James Bruce Llewellyn) (1927–2010), American businessman
- Jaret Llewellyn (born 1970), Canadian water skier
- John Llewellyn (academic) (1915–1988), English chemist and academic administrator
- John Llewellyn (fencer) (born 1957), British fencer
- John Llewellyn (racing driver) (born 1954), British auto racing driver
- John Seys-Llewellyn (1912–2003), Welsh barrister

== K ==
- Karl Llewellyn (1893–1962), American jurist
- Kate Llewellyn (born 1936), Australian poet and author
- Kevin Llewellyn (born 1978), American painter
- Kreg Llewellyn (born 1967), Canadian water skier

== L ==
- Lewis Llewellyn (1881–1931), Welsh rugby union and rugby league footballer
- Livia Llewellyn, American short story horror writer
- Llewellyn Jones Llewellyn (1871–1934), Welsh physician and writer

== M ==
- Max Llewellyn (rugby union) (born 1999), Welsh rugby union footballer
- Max Llewellyn (American football) (born 2002), American football player
- Mike Llewellyn (born 1953), Welsh cricketer
- Morgan Llewellyn (1937–2024), British Army officer
- Morris Llewellyn (fl.1555) English politician

== O ==
- Olivia Llewellyn (born 1980), English actress

== P ==
- Patricia Llewellyn (1962–2017), British television producer
- Paul Llewellyn (born 1957), Australian politician
- Paula Llewellyn, Jamaican lawyer
- Peggy Llewellyn (born 1972), American motorcycle drag racer
- Peter Rodney Llewellyn (born 1947), English businessman and con artist
- Phil Llewellyn (born 1947), Welsh rugby union footballer

== R ==
- Rania Llewellyn, Canadian banker
- Raymond Llewellyn (born c.1930), Welsh actor
- Rebecca Llewellyn (born 1985), Welsh tennis player
- Rees Llewellyn (1851–1919), Welsh industrialist and public figure
- Reese J. Llewellyn (1862–1936), American businessman
- Reginald Llewellyn (1914–2000), British Royal Air Force flying ace of World War II
- Sir Rhys Llewellyn, 2nd Baronet (1910–1978), Welsh mining executive, soldier and author
- Richard Llewellyn (1906–1983), English author of Welsh descent
- Robert Llewellyn (born 1956), English actor, presenter, and writer
- Robert Llewellyn (photographer) (born 1945), American photographer
- Roddy Llewellyn (born 1947), British landscape gardener, author, television presenter and baronet
- Roger Llewellyn (1945–2018), British actor

== S ==
- Sam Llewellyn (born 1948), British author
- Sammy Llewellyn (born 1951), Trinidad and Tobago football player
- Sheila Llewellyn (born 1948), novelist from Northern Ireland
- Stephen Peter Llewellyn (1913–1960), New Zealand soldier, historian and writer
- Steve Llewellyn (1924–2002), Welsh rugby union and rugby league footballer
- Suzette Llewellyn (born 1962), English actress

== T ==
- Ted Llewellyn (1909–2002), Australian rules footballer
- Tom Llewellyn (1882–1956), Welsh rugby union and rugby league footballer
- Tony Llewellyn, Australian musician
- Trevor Llewellyn (1897–1981), Welsh boxer

== W ==
- William Llewellyn (bishop) (1907–2001), British Anglican bishop
- William Llewellyn (painter) (1858–1941), Welsh painter and President of the Royal Academy
- William Llewellyn (priest) (1830–1907), Anglican priest
- William H. H. Llewellyn, American politician from New Mexico
- Willie Llewellyn (1878–1973), Welsh rugby union footballer

== Y ==
- Yuki Okinaga Llewellyn (1939–2020), Japanese-American woman interned during World War II

== See also ==
- Llywelyn (surname)
- Llywelyn (name)
- Llewelyn
- Lewellen (surname)
- Llewellin
- Llewellyn-Jones
- Llewellyn-Smith
