= 1971–72 West Ham United F.C. season =

English football team season

West Ham United
1971–72 season
- Chairman: Reg Pratt
- Manager: Ron Greenwood
- Stadium: Boleyn Ground
- First Division: 14th
- FA Cup: Fifth round
- League Cup: Semi-finals
- Top goalscorer: League: Clyde Best (17); All: Best (23)
- Highest home attendance: 41,892 (vs Manchester United, 1 January 1972)
- Lowest home attendance: 18,479 (vs Southampton, 1 May 1972)
- Average home league attendance: 30,007

In the 1971–72 season West Ham United played in the First Division of English football, finishing 14th.

== Season summary ==
The highlight of West Ham's season came in reaching the semi-finals of the League Cup. After beating title challengers Leeds United and Liverpool, they faced Stoke City in the last four. West Ham won the first leg 2–1 away, but were beaten 1–0 at Upton Park, with Geoff Hurst having a late penalty saved by his England international team-mate Gordon Banks three minutes from the end. The teams then drew 0–0 after extra time in a replay at Hillsborough, and the tie was eventually decided when Stoke won a dramatic second replay 3–2 at Old Trafford, seven weeks after the sides had first met. The game was memorable for Bobby Moore having a stint in goal after West Ham's goalkeeper Bobby Ferguson went off injured, and saving a penalty from Stoke's Mike Bernard, only for Bernard to score from the rebound.

West Ham's form suffered after the League Cup defeat, and they won just four more League matches before the end of the season. In the FA Cup, they struggled past non-League Hereford United in a replay, but were then eliminated by relegation-threatened Huddersfield Town in the fifth round.

This season was the last as West Ham players for club stalwarts Hurst and Harry Redknapp.

== League table ==
Pos	Team	Pld	W	D	L	GF	GA	GAv	Pts
12	Leicester City	42	13	13	16	41	46	0.891	39
13	Ipswich Town	42	11	16	15	39	53	0.736	38
14	West Ham United	42	12	12	18	47	51	0.922	36
15	Everton	42	9	18	15	37	48	0.771	36
16	West Bromwich Albion	42	12	11	19	42	54	0.778	35

Source: World Football
Rules for classification: 1) Points; 2) Goal average; 3) Goals scored

== Results ==
=== Football League First Division ===
Date	Opponent	Venue	Result	Attendance	Goalscorers
14 August 1971	West Bromwich Albion	H	0–1	27,420	
18 August 1971	Derby County	A	0–2	30,583	
21 August 1971	Nottingham Forest	A	0–1	17,185	
23 August 1971	Ipswich Town	H	0–0	25,714	
28 August 1971	Everton	H	1–0	26,878	Best
30 August 1971	Coventry City	H	4–0	28,176	Best (2), Hurst, Robson
4 September 1971	Newcastle United	A	2–2	31,910	Hurst, Robson
11 September 1971	Chelsea	H	2–1	36,866	Best (2)
18 September 1971	Manchester United	A	2–4	53,334	Best, Brooking
25 September 1971	Stoke City	H	2–1	29,193	Best, Moore
2 October 1971	Leeds United	A	0–0	30,942	
9 October 1971	Leicester City	H	1–1	31,060	Hurst
16 October 1971	West Bromwich Albion	A	0–0	20,740	
23 October 1971	Wolverhampton Wanderers	H	1–0	33,883	Best
30 October 1971	Crystal Palace	A	3–0	41,540	Coker, Bonds, Best
6 November 1971	Sheffield United	H	1–2	36,595	Robson
13 November 1971	Huddersfield Town	A	0–1	14,177	
20 November 1971	Manchester City	H	0–2	33,694	
27 November 1971	Liverpool	A	0–1	43,399	
4 December 1971	Arsenal	H	0–0	35,155	
11 December 1971	Southampton	A	3–3	20,506	Bonds, Best, Brooking
18 December 1971	Newcastle United	H	0–1	21,991	
27 December 1971	Tottenham Hotspur	A	1–0	53,868	Best
1 January 1972	Manchester United	H	3–0	41,892	Robson, Best, Hurst (pen)
8 January 1972	Everton	A	1–2	38,482	Hurst (pen)
22 January 1972	Derby County	H	3–3	31,045	Lampard, Robson, Brooking
29 January 1972	Ipswich Town	A	0–1	22,766	
12 February 1972	Wolverhampton Wanderers	A	0–1	26,852	
19 February 1972	Crystal Palace	H	1–1	28,209	Best
29 February 1972	Sheffield United	A	0–3	24,034	
4 March 1972	Huddersfield Town	H	3–0	18,521	Best (2), Robson
11 March 1972	Leicester City	A	0–2	23,345	
18 March 1972	Nottingham Forest	H	4–2	20,960	Robson (2), Hurst, Brooking
21 March 1972	Coventry City	A	1–1	18,640	Best
25 March 1972	Chelsea	A	1–3	45,137	Best
31 March 1972	Leeds United	H	2–2	41,003	Bonds, Hurst
1 April 1972	Tottenham Hotspur	H	2–0	30,763	Brooking, Coker
4 April 1972	Stoke City	A	0–0	24,688	
8 April 1972	Manchester City	A	1–3	38,491	Hurst
15 April 1972	Liverpool	H	0–2	32,660	
22 April 1972	Arsenal	A	1–2	42,251	Brooking
1 May 1972	Southampton	H	1–0	18,479	Robson

=== FA Cup ===
Round	Date	Opponent	Venue	Result	Attendance	Goalscorers
R3	15 January 1972	Luton Town	H	2–1	32,099	Hurst, Best
R4	9 February 1972	Hereford United	A	0–0	15,000	
R4 replay	14 February 1972	Hereford United	H	3–1	42,271	Hurst (3)
R5	26 February 1972	Huddersfield Town	A	2–4	27,080	Robson, Best

=== League Cup ===
Round	Date	Opponent	Venue	Result	Attendance	Goalscorers
R2	8 September 1971	Cardiff City	H	1–1	24,432	Bonds
R2 replay	22 September 1971	Cardiff City	A	2–1	30,100	Hurst (2)
R3	6 October 1971	Leeds United	H	0–0	35,890	
R3 replay	20 October 1971	Leeds United	A	1–0 (aet)	26,504	Best
R4	27 October 1971	Liverpool	H	2–1	40,878	Hurst, Robson
R5	17 November 1971	Sheffield United	H	5–0	36,834	Robson (3), Best (2)
SF 1st leg	8 December 1971	Stoke City	A	2–1	36,400	Hurst (pen), Best
SF 2nd leg	15 December 1971	Stoke City	H	0–1 (aet; 2–2 on agg)	38,771	
SF replay	5 January 1972	Stoke City	N	0–0 (aet)	46,916	
SF 2nd replay	26 January 1972	Stoke City	N	2–3	49,427	Bonds, Brooking

== Players ==
Nation	Player	Pos	Lge Apps	Lge Gls	FAC Apps	FAC Gls	LC Apps	LC Gls	Date signed	Previous club
(Scotland)	Bobby Ferguson	GK	36		4		10		1967	Kilmarnock
(England)	Peter Grotier	GK	6						1969	Academy
(England)	Clive Charles	DF	4						1970	Academy
(England)	Paul Heffer	DF	0 (1)				0 (1)		1966	Academy
(England)	Frank Lampard	DF	39	1	4		10		1967	Academy
(England)	Kevin Lock	DF	1 (2)						1971	Academy
(England)	John McDowell	DF	40		4		10		1969	Academy
(England)	Bobby Moore	DF	40	1	4		10		1958	Academy
(England)	Alan Stephenson	DF	3 (1)						1968	Crystal Palace
(England)	Tommy Taylor	DF	42		4		10		1970	Orient
(England)	Billy Bonds	MF	42	3	4		10	2	1967	Charlton Athletic
(England)	Ronnie Boyce	MF	0 (1)						1959	Academy
(England)	Trevor Brooking	MF	40	6	4		10	1	1967	Academy
(England)	Peter Eustace	MF	2		0 (1)		0 (1)		1970	Sheffield Wednesday
(England)	Pat Holland	MF	4						1969	Academy
(England)	Bobby Howe	MF	1 (4)				0 (2)		1966	Academy
(England)	Dave Llewellyn	MF	1 (1)						1969	Academy
(England)	Harry Redknapp	MF	22		4		9		1965	Academy
(England)	Johnny Ayris	FW	11 (1)				1		1970	Academy
(Bermuda)	Clyde Best	FW	42	17	4	2	10	4	1969	Academy
(United States)	Ade Coker	FW	5	2					1971	Academy
(England)	Joe Durrell	FW	5 (1)						1970	Academy
(England)	Geoff Hurst	FW	34	8	4	4	10	4	1959	Academy
(England)	Pop Robson	FW	42	9	4	1	10	4	1971	Newcastle United
