= Llywelyn =

Llywelyn, Llewelyn or Llewellyn is a name of Welsh language origins. See Llywelyn (name) for the name's etymology, history and other details.

== As a surname ==
- Llywelyn (surname)
- Llewellyn (surname)
- Royce R. Lewellen, California Superior Court judge
- John Dillwyn Llewelyn (1810–1882), Welsh botanist and photographer
- Doug Llewelyn (born 1938), original host of The People's Court
- Margaret Llewelyn Davies (1861–1944), British social activist
- Theodora Llewelyn Davies (1898–1988), British barrister and penal reform campaigner

== As a given name ==
=== Middle Ages ===
Ordered chronologically

- Llywelyn ap Merfyn (died 942), king of Powys
- Llywelyn Aurdorchog (c. 1005–1065), Welsh war-chief, lord of Ial
- Llywelyn ap Seisyll (died 1023), king of Gwynedd and Deheubarth
- Llywelyn the Great (Llywelyn Fawr; Llywelyn ab Iorwerth; c. 1173–1240), Prince of Gwynedd and ruler of most of Wales
- Llywelyn Fawr ap Maredudd, early 13th century lord of Meirionnydd
- Llywelyn ap Gruffudd (c. 1228–1282), last crowned Welsh Prince of Wales
- Llywelyn ap Maredudd ap Llywelyn ap Maredudd ap Cynan (died 1263), minor Welsh prince, last vassal lord of Meirionnydd
- Llywelyn ap Dafydd (c. 1260–1288), heir to the Welsh crown imprisoned in 1283
- Llywelyn Bren (died 1317), nobleman who led a Welsh rebellion in 1316
- Llywelyn ap Gruffydd Fychan (1341–1401), Welsh landowner executed for assisting Owain Glyndŵr's escape from English forces

=== Arts ===
- Llywelyn Goch ap Meurig Hen (c. 1350–1390), Welsh-language court poet
- Llywelyn ab y Moel (died 1440), Welsh-language poet and rebel
- Llewelyn Wyn Griffith (1890–1977), Welsh novelist
- Llewelyn Powys (1884–1939), British writer
- Llywelyn Siôn (c. 1540–1615), Welsh-language poet
- Llewellyn Xavier (born 1945), Saint Lucian artist

=== Military ===
- Llewellyn Chilson (1920–1981), highly decorated United States Army master sergeant
- Llewellyn Garrish Estes (1843–1905), American Civil War soldier awarded the Medal of Honor
- Llewellyn F. Haskell (1842–1929), Union Army officer
- Llewelyn Alberic Emilius Price-Davies (1878–1965), British soldier and recipient of the Victoria Cross

=== Politics ===
- Llewellyn Atherley-Jones (1851–1929), British politician and judge
- Llewellyn L. Callaway (1868–1951), chief justice of the Montana Supreme Court
- Llewellyn Edwards (born 1935), Australian politician and chancellor of the University of Queensland
- Llewellyn W. Larson (1911–1977), American farmer and politician
- Llewellyn Powers (1836–1908), member of the US House of Representatives from Maine
- Llewellyn H. Rockwell, Jr. (born 1944), American libertarian political commentator
- Llewellyn Thomas Smith (Llew Smith) (born 1944), Welsh politician
- Llewellyn Thompson (1904–1972), American diplomat
- Llewellyn Turner (1823–1903), Welsh politician
- Llywelyn Williams (1911–1965), Welsh politician

=== Sports ===
- Llewelyn Alan Curbishley (born 1957), English football manager
- Llewelyn Griffiths (1877–1943), Welsh footballer
- Llewellyn Herbert (born 1977), South African athlete
- Llewelyn Kenrick (1847–1933), Welsh international footballer
- Llewellyn Starks (born 1967), American long jumper

=== Other ===
- Llewellyn John Montfort Bebb (1862–1915), British academic
- Llewellyn Henry Gwynne (1863–1957), first Bishop of Egypt and Sudan
- Llewelyn Lewellin (1798–1878), British cleric and university educator
- Llewellyn Ivor Price (1905–1980), Brazilian paleontologist
- Llewellyn Thomas, British physicist and applied mathematician
- Llewellyn Vaughan-Lee (born 1953), British Sufi mystic and author
- Llewelyn Williams (disambiguation)
- Llewellyn Woodward (1890–1971), British historian

== As a patronymic ==
- Dafydd ap Llewelyn (disambiguation)

== Fictional characters ==
- Louie Duck, full name Llewellyn Louis Duck, a Disney cartoon character, one of Donald Duck's nephews
- Llewelyn Moss, from Cormac McCarthy's novel No Country for Old Men and its film adaption of the same name
- Llewelyn, a young archer in the video game Valkyrie Profile
- Llewellyn, an anthropomorphic dragon from the webcomic Ozy and Millie
- Bronwen "Stormy" Llewellyn, in the novel Odd Thomas
- Llewellyn Watts, a detective in the TV series Murdoch Mysteries played by Daniel Maslany
- Olive Llewellyn, from Emily St. John Mandel's novel Sea of Tranquility
- Bliss Llewellyn, from Melissa De La Cruz's novel Blue Bloods

== See also ==
- W. Llewelyn Williams (1867–1922), Welsh journalist, lawyer and politician
- Lewellyn Lew Christensen (1909–1984), American ballet dancer, choreographer and director
- Llewellin, a surname
- Fluellen, a Welshman from Shakespeare's history Henry V
