= Faccenda =

Faccenda may refer to:

- Faccenda Foods, a British poultry business
- Robin Faccenda (born 1937), British businessman
