= David Llewellyn =

David Llewellyn may refer to:

- David Llewellyn (Australian politician) (born 1942), member of the Parliament of Tasmania
- David Llewellyn (British politician) (1916–1992), British member of parliament for Cardiff North, 1950–1959
- David Llewellyn (author) (born 1978), Welsh novelist
- David Llewellyn (golfer) (born 1951), Welsh golfer
- David Llewellyn (rugby union) (born 1970), Wales international rugby union player also known as Dai
- David Llewellyn (academic administrator) (born 1960), vice-chancellor of Harper Adams University
- Sir David Llewellyn, 1st Baronet (1879–1940), Welsh industrialist and financier
- David Llewellyn (trade unionist) (1907–1981), Welsh trade unionist and political activist
- Dai Llewellyn (Sir David Llewellyn, 4th Baronet, 1946–2009), socialite
- David Herbert Llewellyn (died 1864), doctor who went down with the CSS Alabama
- David Llewellyn (footballer), (born 1949), footballer with West Ham United and Peterborough United

== See also ==
- Dafydd ap Llewelyn (disambiguation)
- David Llewellin (born 1960), Welsh rally driver
