= Lewellyn =

Lewellyn may refer to:

- Lewellyn Park, a public park in Troutdale, Oregon, United States
- Lewellyn Christensen (1909–1984), American ballet dancer, choreographer and director

== See also ==
- Llewellin
- Llywelyn
