= Edward Llewellyn =

Edward Llewellyn may refer to:

- Edward Llewellyn, Baron Llewellyn of Steep (born 1965), former Downing Street Chief of Staff
- Edward Llewellyn-Thomas (1917–1984), English scientist, professor and (under Edward Llewellyn) science-fiction author
- Edward Llewellyn (trumpeter) (1879–1936), American trumpet player
- Ted Llewellyn (1909–2002), Australian rules footballer

== See also ==
- Llewellyn (surname)
