= Llewellyn-Jones =

Llewellyn-Jones is a surname, and may refer to:

- Derek Llewellyn-Jones (1923–1997), Australian gynaecologist and medical author
- Frank Llewellyn-Jones (1907–1997), Welsh physicist and academic administrator
- Frederick Llewellyn-Jones (1866–1941), Welsh solicitor and politician
- Lloyd Llewellyn-Jones, Welsh ancient historian
- Rosie Llewellyn-Jones, British scholar
- Tony Llewellyn-Jones (born 1949), Australian actor
