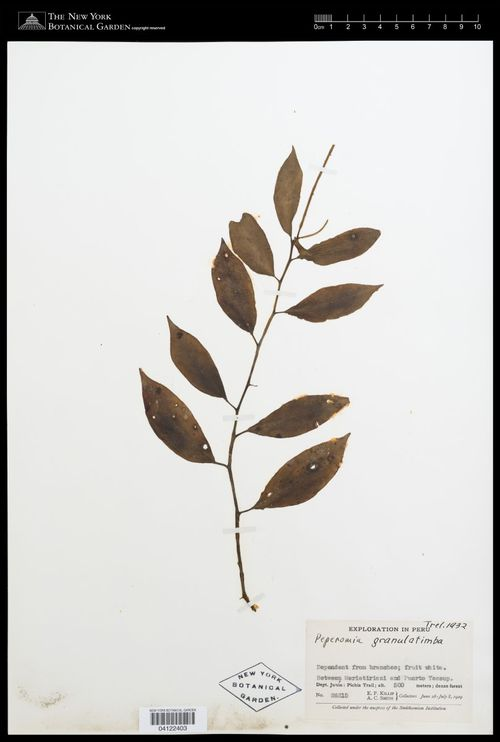

Scientific classification
- Kingdom: Plantae
- Clade: Tracheophytes
- Clade: Angiosperms
- Clade: Magnoliids
- Order: Piperales
- Family: Piperaceae
- Genus: Peperomia
- Species: P. granulatilimba

Binomial name
- Peperomia granulatilimba Trel.

= Peperomia granulatilimba =

Species of epiphyte

Peperomia granulatilimba is a species of epiphyte in the genus Peperomia that is endemic to Peru. It grows on wet tropical biomes. Its conservation status is Threatened.

== Description ==
The type specimen were collected near Balsas, Peru.

Peperomia granulatilimba is a nearly glabrous, pendulous, epiphytic herb with slender stems 2 mm thick. The alternate leaves are somewhat ovate-elliptic, acutely acuminate with a rounded base, measuring 6 cm long and 3 cm wide. Other leaves may be elliptic-oblong with a somewhat acute base, reaching 10 cm long and 4 cm wide. The leaves have few pinnate nerves, a pale granular texture, and are sparsely pilose with long cilia on the margins. The petiole is 5–10 mm long. Three spikes terminate a short sympodial stem, each 100 mm long and 2 mm thick, borne on a peduncle barely 5 mm long. The berries are oblong to conically produced, with an oblique, acute shield bearing the central stigma.

== Taxonomy and naming ==
It was described in 1936 by William Trelease in Publications of the Field Museum of Natural History, Botanical Series 13, from specimens collected by Llewelyn Williams. The epithet granulatilimba combines the Latin granulatus and limbus, referring to the granular texture of the leaf blade.

== Distribution and habitat ==
It is endemic to Peru. It grows on an epiphyte environment and is a herb. It grows on wet tropical biomes.

== Conservation ==
This species is assessed as Threatened, in a preliminary report.
