= The Range Rider =

American Western television series

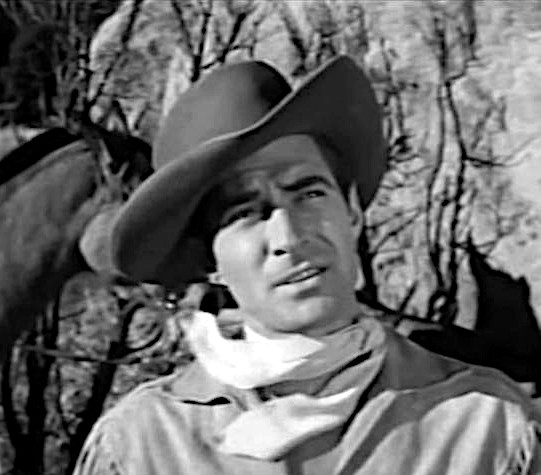
- Jock Mahoney in "The Buckskin" episode of The Range Rider
- Genre: Western
- Written by: Buckley Angell; Eric Freiwald; Oliver Drake; Orville H. Hampton; Lawrence Hazard; Edward Llewellyn; Joe Richardson; Arthur Rowe; Jack Townley
- Directed by: George Archainbaud; William A. Berke; Thomas Carr; John English; Wallace Fox; D. Ross Lederman; Frank McDonald; Don McDougall; Ray Nazarro
- Starring: Jock Mahoney; Dick Jones
- Opening theme: "Home on the Range"
- Composers: Carl Cotner; Walter Greene
- Country of origin: United States
- Original language: English
- No. of seasons: 3
- No. of episodes: 78

Production
- Executive producers: Gene Autry; Louis Gray
- Producers: Hugh McCollum; Armand Schaefer
- Running time: 30 mins. (approx)
- Production company: Range Rider Productions

Original release
- Network: Syndication
- Release: April 5, 1951 – September 1, 1953

The Range Rider is an American Western television series that was first broadcast in syndication from 1951 to 1952. A single lost episode surfaced and was broadcast in 1959. In 1954, the BBC purchased rights to show the program in the UK . It was also shown in Melbourne, Australia, during the 1950s. It was broadcast in Canada and in Rome (with dialog dubbed in Italian).

ABC ran the program on weekends in 1964-65.

== Synopsis ==
Jock Mahoney, later star of CBS's Yancy Derringer, played the title character in 79 black-and-white half-hour episodes, along with partner Dick West, played by Dick Jones, later star of the syndicated series Buffalo Bill, Jr. The character had no name other than Range Rider. His reputation for fairness, fighting ability, and accuracy with his guns was known far and wide, even by Indians. Mahoney towered over Jones, conveying the idea that Dick West was a youth rather than a full-grown adult.

Stanley Andrews, the first host of the syndicated anthology series, Death Valley Days, appeared in 17 episodes of The Range Rider in different roles, including "Pack Rat" and "Marked for Death" in 1951 and "Marshal from Madero" in 1953. Gregg Barton similarly guest-starred in 16 episodes. Harry Lauter, later a co-star with Willard Parker on CBS's Tales of the Texas Rangers, appeared 11 times, including the episodes "Ten Thousand Reward" and "Dim Trails" (both in 1951), "Ambush in Coyote Canyon" (1952), and "Convict at Large" and "Marshal from Madero" (both in 1953). William Fawcett, prior to NBC's Fury, guest-starred in 9 episodes, including in "Diablo Posse", as Matt Ryan in "Last of the Pony Express", "Dim Trails" (all 1951), and "Shotgun Stage" (1952).

== Production ==
The show was a production of Gene Autry's Flying A Productions, and Autry himself was the executive producer, along with Louis Gray. Producers were Hugh McCollum and Armand Schaefer. Directors were George Archainbaud, William Berke, Thomas Carr, Wallace Fox, D. Ross Lederman, Frank McDonald, Donald McDougall, and Ray Nazarro.

Mahoney (who was a stunt man before he became an actor) did his own stunt work on the program, which led to his receiving four broken bones and 16 wounds on his head, in addition to being knocked unconscious three times.

The theme was "Home on the Range", though in later episodes, this was played at a fast tempo without the words.

The Range Rider was the first major syndicated program to be broadcast five times a week in many areas, which led CBS Films to sometimes pull episodes from distribution to prevent overexposure. Although the last episode of the show was made in December 1952, reruns continued to be shown, and by 1958 in some markets they were "on their third time around."

== Promotion ==
CBS owned half of the show and helped to promote it by providing "comprehensive merchandising kits" for use in TV markets. Mahoney promoted the show by making personal appearances on a tour of 20 cities. When he appeared in Pittsburgh, 20,000 children came to see him.

Mahoney and West performed at rodeos in 1953 in cities such as Philadelphia, where they re-enacted stunts from the program and Oakland, where the fights included "use of real furniture — not the easily collapsed propes used in a majority of movies and TV films." A fight at a stock show in Houston resulted in four broken fingers for Jones and an ankle injury for Manoney.

Flying A Productions created a merchandise tie-in by selling buckskin shirts and other items related to the program.

== DVD release ==
In 2006, Timeless Media Group released a licensed two-DVD (Region 1), 10-episode best-of collection. Subsequently, a second licensed set was released, this time consisting of 20 episodes on six DVDs. Between 2005 and 2007, Alpha Home Entertainment released five unlicensed best-of DVDs (region 0), with four episodes on each. Though the series is not actually in the public domain, various episodes also appear in numerous unlicensed budget TV Western DVD collections.

== Cultural references ==
In The A-Team episode When you Comin' Back, Range Rider? (season two, episodes five and six), Murdock is seen watching an episode of The Range Rider in his room at the psychiatric hospital. He adopts the persona of the Range Rider as the team pursues wild mustang rustlers, and is frequently seen wearing a mask of the Range Rider he cut from a cereal box.
