= Fluellen (surname) =

Fluellen is a name of Welsh origin originally derived from Llywelyn. It may refer to:

- David Fluellen (born 1992), American football running back
- Andre Fluellen (born 1985), American football defensive tackle
- Fluellen, fictional character in the play Henry V by William Shakespeare
