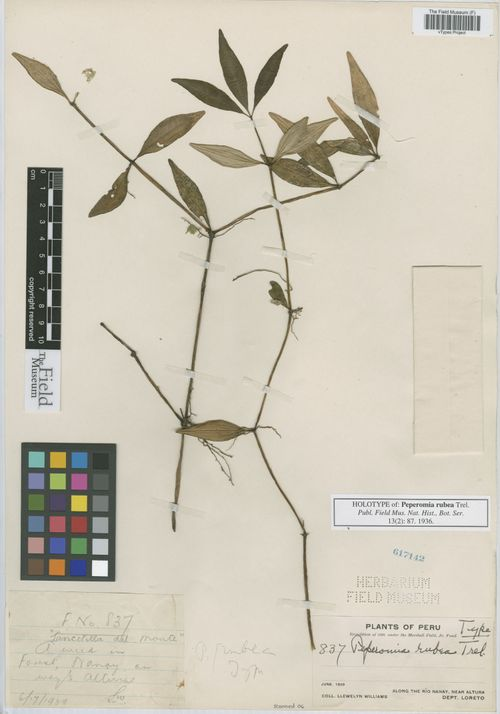

Scientific classification
- Kingdom: Plantae
- Clade: Tracheophytes
- Clade: Angiosperms
- Clade: Magnoliids
- Order: Piperales
- Family: Piperaceae
- Genus: Peperomia
- Species: P. rubea

Binomial name
- Peperomia rubea Trel.

= Peperomia rubea =

Species of flowering plant

Peperomia rubea is a species of epiphyte in the genus Peperomia that is endemic in Peru. It grows on wet tropical biomes. Its conservation status is Threatened.

== Description ==
The type specimen were collected near Nanay to Altura, Peru.

Peperomia rubea is a creeping, glabrous, reddish, terrestrial herb with erect, leafy branches. The leaves are in whorls of 2–3 at the nodes. They are narrowly lanceolate, gradually narrowed toward the narrowly rounded apex, with a very acute base, measuring 4–5.5 cm long and about 1 cm wide (or wider). They are 3-nerved, with the nerves impressed above and prominent beneath. The petiole is 5 mm long. The inflorescence was not seen on the type specimen.

== Taxonomy and naming ==
It was described in 1936 by William Trelease in Publications of the Field Museum of Natural History, Botanical Series 13, from specimens collected by Llewelyn Williams. The epithet rubea is Latin for "reddish," referring to the reddish coloration of the plant.

== Distribution and habitat ==
It is endemic in Peru. It grows on a epiphyte environment and is a herb. It grows on wet tropical biomes.

== Conservation ==
This species is assessed as Threatened.
