= Jim Barrett Jr. =

English footballer

Jim Barrett
Personal information
- Full name: James Guy Barrett
- Date of birth: 5 November 1930
- Place of birth: West Ham, Essex, England
- Date of death: 21 October 2014 (aged 83)
- Place of death: Haverhill, England
- Position: Inside forward

Youth career
- –1949: West Ham United

Senior career*
Years	Team	Apps	(Gls)
1949–1954	West Ham United	85	(24)
1954–1959	Nottingham Forest	105	(64)
1959–1960	Birmingham City	10	(4)
Total		200	(92)
- * Club domestic league appearances and goals

James Guy Barrett (5 November 1930 – 21 October 2014) was an English footballer who played for West Ham United. His father, James William Barrett, also played for the club from 1924 to 1939.

Born in West Ham, Essex, Jim Jnr played football as a junior for West Ham, and played with his father as a teenager for West Ham A in 1945–46. He signed for the senior side in February 1949 and went on to make 85 league and 2 cup appearances for the east London club, scoring 25 goals.

He was sold to Nottingham Forest in December 1954, and went on to become their top scorer for the 1956–57 season. He also played for Birmingham City, playing 10 games and scoring four goals before his playing career ended aged 29.

He later returned to West Ham to become player-manager of the A team assisting the development of players such as Harry Redknapp, John Charles and Paul Heffer. He moved to Millwall in 1968, where he worked under ex-Hammer Ben Fenton. Barrett died in 2014, aged 83.
