= Cardiff English =

Regional variety of English, in Wales

- Native to: Cardiff, United Kingdom
- Region: Port Talbot
- Language family: Indo-European: Germanic; West Germanic; Ingvaeonic; Anglic; English; British English; Welsh English; Cardiff English
- Writing system: Latin (English alphabet)

Language codes
- ISO 639-3: –
- Glottolog: None

Location of Cardiff (orange) within Wales

Cardiff English is a variety of Welsh English, as spoken in and around the city of Cardiff, and is somewhat distinctive in Wales, compared with other Welsh dialects. The pitch of the Cardiff accent is described as somewhat lower than that of Received Pronunciation, whereas its intonation is closer to accents of England rather than Wales.

It is estimated that around 500,000 people speak Cardiff English. The dialect is generally limited to inside the city's northern boundary, rather than the nearby South Wales Valleys where the spoken variety of English is different. However, the dialect area spreads east and west of the city's political borders, covering much of the former counties of South Glamorgan (Barry) and south-west Gwent, including Newport and coastal Monmouthshire.

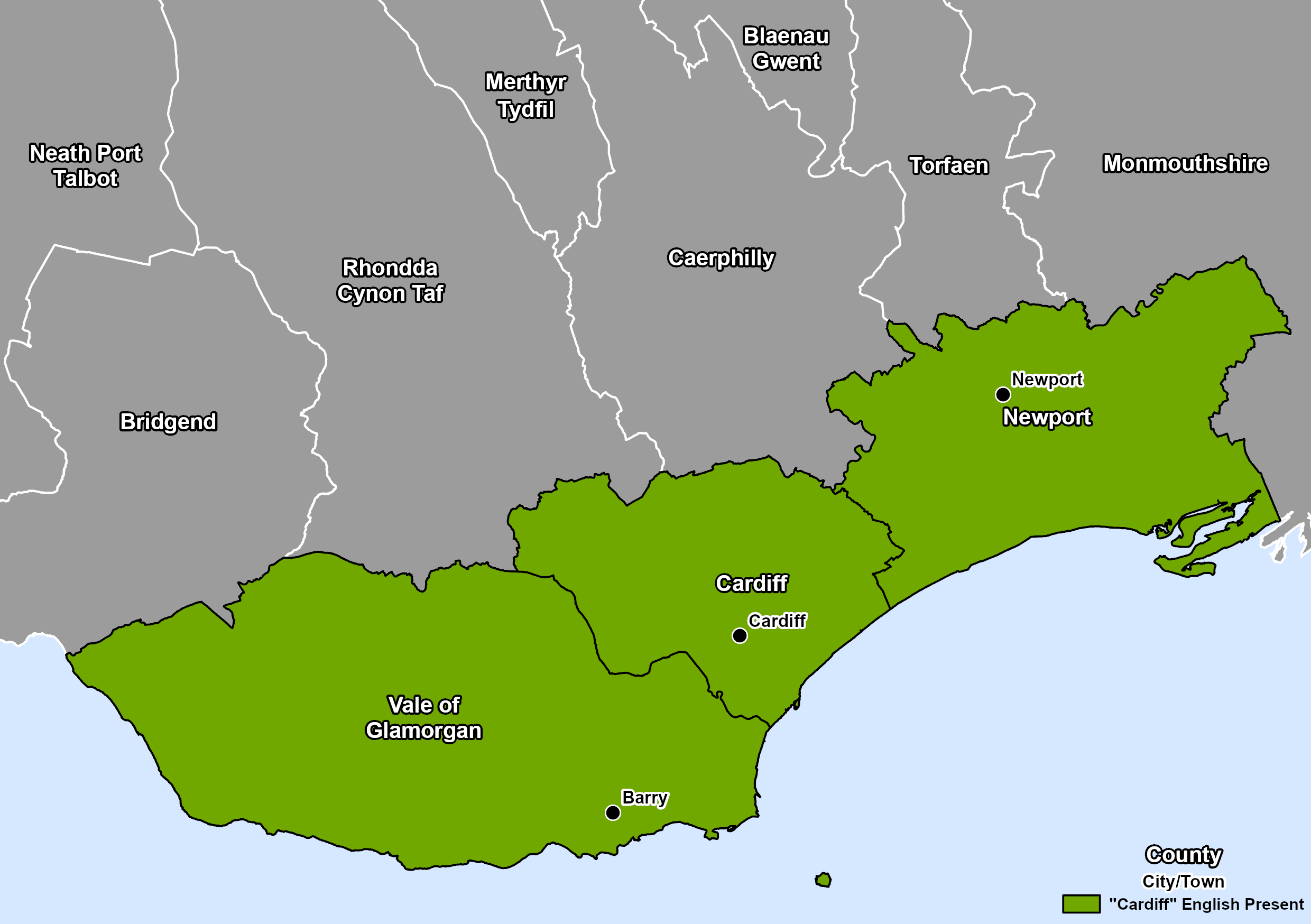
Counties where a Cardiff accent (or related) are commonly found.

The dialect developed distinctively as the city grew in the nineteenth century, with an influx of migrants from different parts of Britain and further afield. The Cardiff accent and the dialect's vocabulary has been influenced in particular by those who moved there from the English Midlands, the West Country, other parts of Wales, and Ireland. The Survey of English Dialects did not cover Cardiff but it did survey nearby Newport and six small villages in Monmouthshire.

== Influence ==
The formation of the modern Cardiff accent has been cited as having an Irish influence, similar to the influence of Liverpool's Scouse accent, given both cities' status as major world ports. This argument can also be made for nearby ports of Newport and Barry, which also attracted internal migrants during the industrial revolution. Of note is its great similarity to West Country dialects, where many moved from for work on the nearby docks. According to a 2005 BBC study, the Cardiff accent, as well as that of Liverpool and East London, is in the process of changing due to the modern influence of immigration on youth, primarily of Arabic and Hindustani influence.

== Social variation ==
Research has shown that there is a great sociolinguistic variation on the Cardiff accent, that is to say, a difference in the way people speak from different social backgrounds in Cardiff. Unsurprisingly, those from a more affluent background generally speak with a less broad accent, closer to that of standard English, compared with people from a working-class background. Thus, the city itself has different dialects, with people from the less affluent eastern and western districts of the city having a stronger and broader accent than those living in the more affluent north Cardiff.

== Phonetics and phonology ==
Cardiff English shares many phonetic traits with the English spoken in the Severnside area of England, but differs in being non-rhotic. A notable characteristic in the accent is the lack of rounding lips when pronouncing consonants and vowels. While in Received Pronunciation, lip-rounding is a common feature to distinguish vowels, in Cardiff English this is not often observed.

The tongue also holds a slightly different shape with people speaking in Cardiff English. The front is rigid and close to the alveolar ridge, while the back is relaxed, creating a large pharyngeal cavity. In continuous speech, the soft palate is also lowered, providing a slight nasal quality. Creaky voice is mainly absent and can only be found in prestigious middle-class varieties as in RP. The vocal folds are tenser than in Received Pronunciation, giving a husky, breathy sound to articulation, with the overall effect of greater resonance, tension and hoarseness makes the accent often thought of as being "harsh" or "unpleasant".

Place names in Cardiff, such as Crwys and Llanedeyrn, may be pronounced in a way which reflects rules of neither Welsh nor English.

=== Consonants ===
Consonants in CE share general similarities to that of Received Pronunciation. Unique characteristics of consonants of this accent include:

- Strong aspiration or affrication of voiceless stops /p, t, k/ as [pʰʰ, tʰʰ, kʰʰ] or [pɸ, ts, kx] respectively, which occurs in initial position in predominantly stressed syllables. Sometimes, the stops may be realised as a pure fricative, such as /k/ realised as [x] intervocallically. When not in initial position, these stops can also be glottalised in the manner of RP, although this becomes weaker in broader forms of the accent.
  - glottalisation of /t/ before /ən/, also in the /ntən/ sequence (as in Canton) which is always pronounced with an alveolar plosive in RP. Furthermore, the final syllable of little is commonly pronounced as [ʔɫ̩].
- Flapping of /t/ generally occurs between voiced phonemes. It can even be an approximant [ɹ̠].
- Like RP, consistent yod-coalescence of /tj, dj/ [tʃ, dʒ].
- Fricative allophones for voiced stops in medial position, especially with /b/ turning to [β]. Furthermore, they are noticeably devoiced in final position.
- The fricatives /s, z/ may have slightly sharper friction, especially before front vowels; on the other hand /ʃ, ʒ/ may lack labialisation found in other accents. Like the voiced stops, /z/ can be devoiced to /s/.
- Realisation of /ð/ more often as an approximant rather than a fricative, and undergoes elision as mentioned below.
- G-dropping is common. Despite carrying out mild stigma, it can still carry prestige as it is heard in middle-class varieties of the accent.
  - More common in younger working-class varieties, -thing is sometimes pronounced [-θɪŋk].
- H-dropping often occurs as the /h/ is only a marginal consonant in the dialect, being commonly dropped in the so-called 'weak forms'; pronouns and the modal auxiliaries had, has, have. Intervocallically, there is a voiced allophone [ɦ] such as ahead. Studies in the travel agency have been recorded that 'weak forms' are variably dropped, with these same group of people constantly dropping words like hotel (which are in turn preceded by an), emphasising its French origins. It undergoes the same stigma as in Wells (1982:254).
  - In the broadest forms of the accent, /hj/ is /j/, commonly represented in the words huge and human. This is also found to a degree in Ireland and American cities influenced by these accents such as Philadelphia and New York City. However, higher-class speakers may pronounce similar to RP, as [ç], although the articulation is more front and the narrowing is closer, making Cardiff's [ç] sound markedly prominent to RP.
- The broadest accents may realise /r/ particularly as a tap [ɾ] intervocalically and after the consonants /b, v, θ/. It can also sometimes be tapped word-initially. Otherwise, it is generally a postalveolar approximant [ɹ̠]. Cardiff's taps involve a much larger portion of the tongue and is less rapid than in RP, almost as long as /d/. This can cause some homophones between tapped/approximant /r/ and /t/, including butter/borough, hotter/horror and starting/starring.
- Like several northern English dialects, some words' final consonants may be devoiced, in words such as second or wardrobe. The conjunction and, when stressed and before a break, is also notably pronounced /ˈant/.
- Slight palatal friction of /j/; often elided before /iː/.
- Unlike other South Wales varieties, /l/ has the same clear/dark allophones as RP, namely with clear [l] before vowels and /j/, and [ɫ] (which can be heavily velar) before other consonants and pauses.
  - [ɫ] is frequently a syllabic [ɫ̩]. Alternatively an [ə] can be added before the consonant, otherwise the consonant may be vocalised as a close back vowel.
- /w/ is unrounded [ɰ], especially before /iː/.
- Two loan consonants from Welsh, /ɬ/ and /x/ are included in the dialect, but are only found in Welsh names.
  - /ɬ/ is often debated as to whether it even should be considered as a phoneme in Cardiff English, as it is exclusively found in people of Welsh-speaking backgrounds or people who have patriotic sentiments to the Welsh language. Many speakers who do not pronounce a convincing /ɬ/ find it difficult or even possible anyway, so they would substitute it with either /l, kl, θl, xl/, in names such as Llewelyn, Llandaff.
  - /x/ (Usually realised as [χ] under Welsh influence), on the other hand, is more manifested as many speakers of the accent pronounce it in such as Castell Coch, Mynachdy, Pantbach, although that is not to say substitutions such as /k/ exist. /x/ can also be found in a few interjections of disgust, such as ugh or ach-y-fi/ych a fi.

=== Vowels ===
Cardiff English monophthongs, from Collins & Mees (1990:93, 95). Depending on the speaker, the long /ɛː/ may be of the same height as the short /ɛ/.

The accent is non-rhotic, in other words the /r/ is only pronounced before a vowel. Much like RP, linking and intrusive R is present in Cardiff English, such as in drawing [ˈdɹʌːɹɪn] or draw attention [ˈdɹʌːɹ əˈtɛnʃn̩].

Unlike the consonants, CE's vowels are significantly different from Received Pronunciation. Many vowels in this accent have a more centralised articulation, as well as the starting points of most diphthongs, as seen below. Like mentioned above, at least the broad varieties seem to lack labialisation. However, if they are labialised, they are articulated with tight lips.

==== Monophthongs ====
Monophthongs of CE
	Front			Central	Back	
	unrounded		rounded	Central	Back	
	short	long	long	short	short	long
Close	ɪ	iː		ɤ		uː
Mid	ɛ	ɛː	øː	ə		ʌː
Open	a	aː			ɑ	

- The FLEECE vowel is markedly closer and more front, generally having no glide, when compared to RP [ɪi].
  - Word-final HAPPY is generally short and often more open than /iː/ ([i̞]), although few broader speakers use a short close vowel [i].
- KIT is a somewhat more open [ɪ̞], compared to typical RP, causing non-Cardiffians to interpret it as the DRESS vowel. However, more modern RP speakers have a similar realisation as Cardiff.
- The weak vowel merger is variable, so that words such as anniversary /ˌanɪˈvøːsəriː/ and elephant /ˈɛlɪfənt/ often feature [ə], rather than [ɪ]: [ˌanəˈvøːsəɹi, ˈɛləfn̩t]. In broader speech, this can be replaced with /iː/: [ˌaniːˈvøːsəɾi, ˈɛliːfn̩t]. However, the ending ⟨ing⟩ is usually [ɪn], rather than [ən]. The situation is thus as in modern RP, with some words and morphemes being commonly pronounced with an unstressed [ɪ] and others with [ə].
- Like FLEECE, GOOSE is also closer, somewhat advanced and generally has no glide found in RP [ʊu] and several other British dialects.
- The vowel in SQUARE is a steady monophthong [eː], significantly raised well above open-mid, which is the common realisation the in-glide of the Received Pronunciation equivalent.
- DRESS is a more open and slightly retracted [ɛ̞] when compared to RP. Like in the diagram above, some may have their SQUARE vowel at the same height as this vowel, only differentiated by vowel length.
- A closer and fronter vowel [ëː] is used for NURSE, when compared to RP. It is usually realised with strong rounding, even the broadest accents have at least a slight rounding. Accents in the general register have a close-mid tongue height.
- STRUT and COMMA can be considered to belong to one phoneme /ə/, although some sources claim contrast otherwise, which is problematic as there are no minimal pairs between these two vowels. When stressed, it covers a wide allophonic variation as shown in the chart. It is typically open-mid or above, and much closer than RP.
- The FOOT vowel /ɤ/ is phonetically central [ɘ]. A similar vowel is used by younger speakers of RP instead of the traditional [ʊ].
- Broad forms of Cardiff English use a centralised, unrounded and open-mid THOUGHT [ʌ̈ː], with higher-class accents having a closer vowel with strong rounding that is typical of RP. The horse–hoarse merger is present with younger speakers, although a preservation with some older speakers does exist.
- PALM is one of the most characteristic vowels of the accents, generally being an open front vowel [aː] and notably longer than Received Pronunciation. Broader accents typically exhibit raising, most commonly as [æː], with [ɛː] being heard from the broadest accents of working-class males. Within the United Kingdom, there is no other dialect that has a vowel more raised than [æː], although some American dialects may have these realisations. Regardless if neighbouring any nasal consonants, it is frequently nasalised itself ([ãː, æ̃ː, ɛ̃ː]); this has been linked to Merseyside velarised speech. The raising of this vowel has been stigmatised with local Cardiff culture, especially its city name Cardiff [ˈkæːdɪf], as well as Cardiff Arms Park and a pint of dark, referring to the local brew Brains Dark.
- TRAP is typically open [a~a̠] varying from front to central, similar to modern RP, with broader accents having a closer realisation as [æ] or even [ɛ̞], resembling that of more typical RP. However, the broad pronunciation is stigmatised in the same manner as PALM. A small set of words including bad, bag, mad and man can be lengthened though the vowel quality is still that of TRAP, which is always slightly lower than PALM.
  - The trap-bath split is variable among status, being the most used in higher-class forms of the accent due to social pressure of the influence of RP. It is however, apparently confusing for speakers of broad and general accents, as TRAP is preferred before nasals and PALM before fricatives. However, certain words like ask, bath, grant, laugh, master, rather and the suffix -graph are strongly likely to be pronounced with PALM. On the other hand, answer, castle, chance, dance and nasty are always pronounced with TRAP. Even so, the vowels may be conflated thus both variations can be produced even in succeeding sentences.
- The LOT vowel is unrounded and noticeably fronter than RP ([ɑ̟]).

==== Diphthongs ====
Cardiff English diphthongs, from Collins & Mees (1990:97)

According to Collins & Mees (1990:92–93), the diphthongs in CE are /ei, əu, əi, ʌu, ʌi/, corresponding to FACE, GOAT, PRICE, MOUTH and CHOICE respectively. Coupland (1988:25) transcribes /ei, əu, ʌu/ with ⟨eː, oː, əu⟩. Speakers also exhibit both the pane–pain and toe–tow merger, which contrasts with some other southern Welsh varieties. Centring diphthongs such as NEAR and CURE do not exist and often correspond to disyllabic sequences /iːə/ and /uːə/ (see below for details).

- FACE is a clear diphthong and has a more closer, centralised in-glide and a closer end point as opposed to RP. Very few older speakers may conservatively have very narrow glides (i.e. [eɪ]), making it only as a potential diphthong.
- The most common realisation of GOAT is a central–back glide [ə̝u], although a non-standard variant is slightly backed to [öu]. Like FACE, GOAT also has a closer end point than RP. The traditional pronunciation was more of a slight back diphthong [oʊ].
- A noticeably closer in-glide to RP can be seen in PRICE.
- Similar to PRICE, MOUTH has a somewhat closer starting point than RP.
- CHOICE's in-glide is unrounded and more centralised compared to RP.

The sequence /juː/, when not coalesced in words like nude or you is /ɪu/ like many other Welsh accents. However, CE has lost the distinction in environments where /j/ cannot proceed certain consonants in RP that can in other Welsh accents as /ɪu/, such as juice or crew.

Centring diphthongs do not exist. RP NEAR is mostly a disyllabic sequence /iːə/. In a handful of words (near, mere, year, ear, here and hear) and their derivatives, the pronunciation may be either /iːə/ or /jøː/. It is not unusual to hear the last four words all pronounced as /jøː/. Before /r/ and /l/, the pronunciation is monophthongal /iː/, where RP would actually have /ɪə/.

RP CURE vowel is either a disyllabic sequence /uːə/ or merges with the THOUGHT vowel /ʌː/. THOUGHT almost always replaces the word sure; when after consonant + /j/ (such as cure or pure), the use of THOUGHT increases by class status. However, when without /j/ (such as insure or tour), the upper middle class would use the THOUGHT vowel less compared to other classes.

Furthermore, Cardiff English does not have smoothing, unlike RP, which is like other Welsh accents. Examples include buying and tower as [ˈbəi(j)ɪn] and [ˈtʌu(w)ə]. However, a notable exception exists with our being pronounced as [aː].

=== Intonation ===
The intonation of Cardiff English is generally closer to English accents rather than Welsh, but with a wider pitch range than in Received Pronunciation. Nevertheless, the average pitch is lower than other South Wales accents and RP. High rising terminal is also what characterises the dialect from RP, as well as consistency in intonation with strong expression; such as annoyance, excitement and emphasis.

=== Assimilation and elision ===
Like RP and a lot of other English dialects, Cardiff English is prone to constant assimilation and elision. It is the consistency and use of assimilation, even when speaking slowly, distinguishes CE from other English accents. It should also be noted that patterns found in other South Wales dialects are not found in Cardiff and instead is influenced by British accents.

- /ð/ is commonly elided at the beginning of a word, e.g. that, there /at, ɛː/. /ð/ may also assimilate and be pronounced the same to these alveolar consonants /l, n/ when preceding /ð/. Although a similar phenomenon exists in RP, it is much more common and may even carry out to stressed syllables, e.g. all that [ʌːl ˈlat], although [ʌːlˈləu] and in these [ɪn ˈniːz].
- The contractions doesn't, isn't, wasn't is often realised with the /z/ as a stop [d] under the influence of the following nasal, realised as [ˈdədn̩, ˈɪdn̩, ˈwɑdn̩], which can be found Southern American English, although to a broader extent. Cardiff English can further reduce this to [ˈdənː, ˈɪnː, ˈwɑnː].
  - Also, the phrase isn't it pronounced as [ˈɪnɪt] (and often spelt innit) is a common characteristic of the dialect. However, there is no justification to be classified as an elided form of the full pronunciation, as there is no evidence of speakers analysing it as a clausal form with the pronoun it.
- Final /d, t/ before another consonant is often elided, as in about four [əˈbʌu ˈfʌː], but we [bə ˈwiː], pocket money [ˈpɑkɪ məni], started collecting [ˈstaːtɪ kəˈlɛktɪn] and United States [juːˈnəitɪ ˈsteits]. In high-frequency words, including at, bit, but, get, got, let, it, lot, out, quite, said and that, may also be elided before a vowel or a pause, as in but I [bə əi] and that's right [ˈðas ˈɹəi]. Moreover, final /-nt/ may be simplified to /-n/ not only before consonants like in RP, but also before vowels, as in don't drive [dəun ˈdrəiv] or can't handle [kaːn ˈandɫ̩].
  - A final /t, ts/ is sometimes fricatised to /s/, as in about Secret Seven, gets some, it's dead [əˈbʌus ˈsiːkrɪs ˈsɛvn̩, ˈɡɛs səm, ɪs ˈdɛd].
- Intervocalically /r/ is occasionally elided and lengthen the previous vowel, as in America [əˈmɛːɪkə] or very [ˈvɛːiː].
- Unstressed /ə, ɪ/ are mainly elided for vowels, as in except police [sɛpt ˈpliːs].

== Grammar ==
Many of the grammatical features below are influenced from south-western dialects of England, particularly sharing with the dialect of Reading. Non-standard forms when associated with Cardiff often have a negative reaction since most dialects in Wales are influenced by Welsh.

- The Northern Subject Rule is a common feature of the colloquial Cardiff dialect, which is the tendency to use a third-person singular verb conjugation for all pronouns in the present tense. Examples include I lives in Cardiff, we likes it, they squeaks when you walks. This can also extend to the irregular be and do, such as they's awful or we does it often, and sometimes with have (they never has homework).
  - When have is used as an auxiliary, e.g. they have been, it is more likely to be elided as in they been, like many other colloquial or non-standard dialects. Likewise, do as an auxiliary is used, as in they does try. In Reading, the third-person singular forms are used to a lesser extent, with have never being the case but do occasionally. On the other hand, the form dos /duːz/ does exist in Reading but is not attested in Cardiff except for the phrase fair dos 'give her/him due credit', which is analysed as a plural morpheme rather than an inflectional one.
- Conversely, an irregular verb conjugated with third-person singular pronoun can take a first-person singular verb conjugation, specifically with have, but also with do. Examples include she've gone, he do his work, it don't swim. Negative third-person forms of have are difficult to analyse as their forms can be heavily elided; forms such as hasn't, haven't or even ain't can be homophonous.
- The first and third singular past-tense forms of be, was can once again be found in all pronouns you was, we was, they was. However unlike Reading, were replacing standard was cannot be done except occasionally in negative forms (i.e. she weren't). Sometimes, this may be extended to other irregular verbs when that verb's past participle is the same or very similar as the infinitive form, as in he give a book, she come over here.
- Double negatives are also present as in some other urban dialects of English, e.g. I haven't had nothin', there isn't no-one in. Similarly never can also be used to negate the past tense in the same manner, as in I never did nothin.
- Them to mean 'those', as in He likes them cats, similar to other non-standard dialects.
- Lack of plurals on nouns of measurement, similar to other colloquial British dialects, e.g. forty pound, seven foot long (also consider standard six foot five).
- Using adjectival forms for adverbs, such as shop local (found in many Cardiffian cornerstores), she drives lovely.
- Removal of prepositional particles when following adverbs, out for 'out of', over for 'over to/in', up for 'up at/in' etc.
  - Nevertheless, non-standard particle compounds indicating position and direction are present, represented in where to. It mainly acts as a postposition as in where's that to?, however it can also be a preposition (where's to the keys?), although this can be non-standard (e.g. where to are you going? vs. where are you going to?).
- The positional and directional adjuncts here and there can be prefixed with by: by here and by there.
- Like other various urban dialects, reflexive pronouns all use the possessive form as their base rather than the accusative, i.e. hisself for himself or theirselves for themselves. An alternative construction his/her mitt etc. is also used when referring to people, literally meaning 'his/her hand'.
- The discourse tag isn't it?/innit?, although stereotyped in Welsh English in especially rural areas, is commonly heard in Cardiff. It may simply be a function word, similar to isn't that so? (French: n'est-ce pas ?) or Northern Welsh yes? and can also interchange with standard don't/didn't they regardless of social class.
- Not found in other Welsh dialects is predicate fronting, where the predicate is moved to the beginning of the sentence, i.e. hurt he was or awful I thought it sounded, which is influenced by Welsh. In standard English, this also occurs, although this is referred to as 'thematic fronting'.
- Juxtaposition with particles of different meaning in a sentence, e.g. I'll be over there now, in a minute.

== Vocabulary ==
Cardiff generally shares its vocabulary with south-west Wales, although a lot of its naturalised vocabulary as well as Welsh loanwords from the area are lost and unrecognisable in Cardiff, specifically farming terms, which use is sparse in the city.

Nevertheless, these terms are still present to some degree in Cardiff:

- to clam (for) — to yearn, to die for (colloquial)
- dap — plimsole
  - to dap — to bounce, or rarer to hit
  - dap(per) — describes a person's height, usually of a small size (dap of a lad 'small boy') but can also refer to taller people (i.e. she's that dap) when specifying non-verbally
  - dapping — only bouncing once and then catching it, by more specific sources
- half — an emphatic particle, e.g. s/he's half tidy, general approval expression; he don't half kid herself, 'he is pretentious/grandiose'.
- hopper — known by some as a tipping-grain container and not exactly a seed basket
- lush, cracking — great, fabulous, attractive
- off — unfriendly, hostile
- pine-end — used by a small amount to refer to the end of a gable
- pluddle — to puddle, occasionally used as in to puddle through a pool 'to walk through water'
- tidy — a general term of approval. It covers a variety of meanings including tidy looking 'nice-looking', tidy sort 'decent', tidy job 'job well done' etc. although some claim it has no direct equivalent in standard English

== Notable speakers ==
The accent can be heard in varying degrees in the voices of Frank Hennessy, Charlotte Church, Colin Jackson, Craig Bellamy and Stan Stennett.

== Opinions ==
A common first reaction to the accent is often that it is scarcely different from what is considered a "proper Welsh accent", which is usually seen by most outside Wales as being the variety spoken in the South Wales Valleys. The accent is also sufficiently distinct from standard English that researchers from the University of Birmingham have carried out research on the accent in an effort to improve speech recognition software.

The former Assembly First Minister Rhodri Morgan pointed out in a pamphlet of Cardiff that having a strong Cardiff accent has long been an issue of class, recalling how teachers at a Cardiff high school prepared pupils for the middle class professions by reciting: "Hark, hark the lark In Cardiff Arms Park!"

In a survey, carried out by the BBC, Welsh accents are among the least popular accents in the UK. However, the Cardiff accent was rated higher than that of nearby Swansea.

In the 1960s, Gwyn Thomas, a Valleys man, described the speech of Cardiffians in the following way:

The speaking voices of this city fascinate. The immigrant half, the visitors from the hills, speak with a singing intonation, as if every sentence is half-way into oratorio, the vowels as broad as their shoulders. The Cardiff speech, a compound of the native dialect and a brand of High Bristolian, gives an impression of a wordly hardness. They speak of 'Cairdiff', 'Cathays Pairk', and for a long time it is not amiable to the ear. There is an edge of implied superiority in it to the rather innocent and guiless openness of the valley-speech.

== Bibliography ==
- Bolton, Kingsley; Kachru, Braj B., eds. (2006), "The English language in Wales", World Englishes: Critical Concepts in Linguistics, Volume 1, Taylor & Francis, p. 333, ISBN 0-41531-505-0
- Collins, Beverley; Mees, Inger M. (1990), "The Phonetics of Cardiff English", in Coupland, Nikolas; Thomas, Alan Richard (eds.), English in Wales: Diversity, Conflict, and Change, Multilingual Matters Ltd., pp. 87–103, ISBN 1-85359-032-0
- Coupland, Nikolas (1988), Dialect in Use: Sociolinguistic Variation in Cardiff English, University of Wales Press, ISBN 0-70830-958-5
- Mees, Inger M. (1977), Language and social class in Cardiff: a survey of the speech habits of schoolchildren (Unpublished Master's Dissertation), University of Leiden
- Mees, Inger M. (1983), The Speech of Cardiff Schoolchildren: A Real Time Study (Unpublished Doctoral Dissertation), University of Leiden
- Wells, John C. (1982), Accents of English, Vol. 2: The British Isles (pp. i–xx, 279–466), Cambridge University Press, doi:10.1017/CBO9780511611759, ISBN 0-52128540-2
