= Hands Free Hectare =

The Hands Free Hectare (HFH) project was established in order to develop and showcase agricultural automation by completing the world's first fully autonomous cropping cycle. Based at Harper Adams University, Shropshire, UK, working in collaboration with Precision Decisions.

== Background ==
The idea for the Hands Free Hectare project was conceived in 2015 by two staff working in the Engineering Department at Harper Adams University, Kit Franklin and Jonathan Gill, who were frustrated by the pace and limited scope of academic developments in the area of field agricultural automation/robotics that they believed had become stagnant when compared to tech sectors such as UAVs. Jonathan was utilising open source technologies (OS Software & OS hardware) to build UAVs and the pair felt they could adapt these systems to work on agricultural vehicles. They also felt it was critical to showcase the machines operating in the field to change the perception of the agricultural industry and being the first to complete a full cropping cycle seemed like a compelling challenge. With publicity in mind, the project would need a memorable name. Hands Free Hectare came out of a short discussion between Kit and Jonathan. It was written down on a post-it note and stuck on the lab wall where is stayed for nearly a year prior to the project, as is described in episode 75 of the Rock and Roll Farming podcast.

After considering how to get the project off the ground, Kit and Jonathan approached Clive Blacker, the director of Precision Decisions and a prominent precision agriculture service provider, to propose an Innovate UK collaboration whereby working together they would develop an autonomous system and grow a first crop.

== Hands Free Hectare 2016–2017 ==
The project started in October 2016, with the team initially conducting system developments on a small prototype vehicle prior to receiving the ISEKI compact tractor which was adapted to conduct autonomous farming tasks. During the project the team (now also including Precision Decisions engineer Martin Abell) worked as a fully integrated skunkworks to develop the systems needed. Progress was reviewed and monitored weekly to avoid missing strict cropping cycle dates, as discussed at the IAgrE Landwards Conference 2018. As per the name of the project, the area to be farmed autonomously was a hectare of land. It was fenced off to ensure the safety of visitors to the site, and also gave it the feel of an arena.

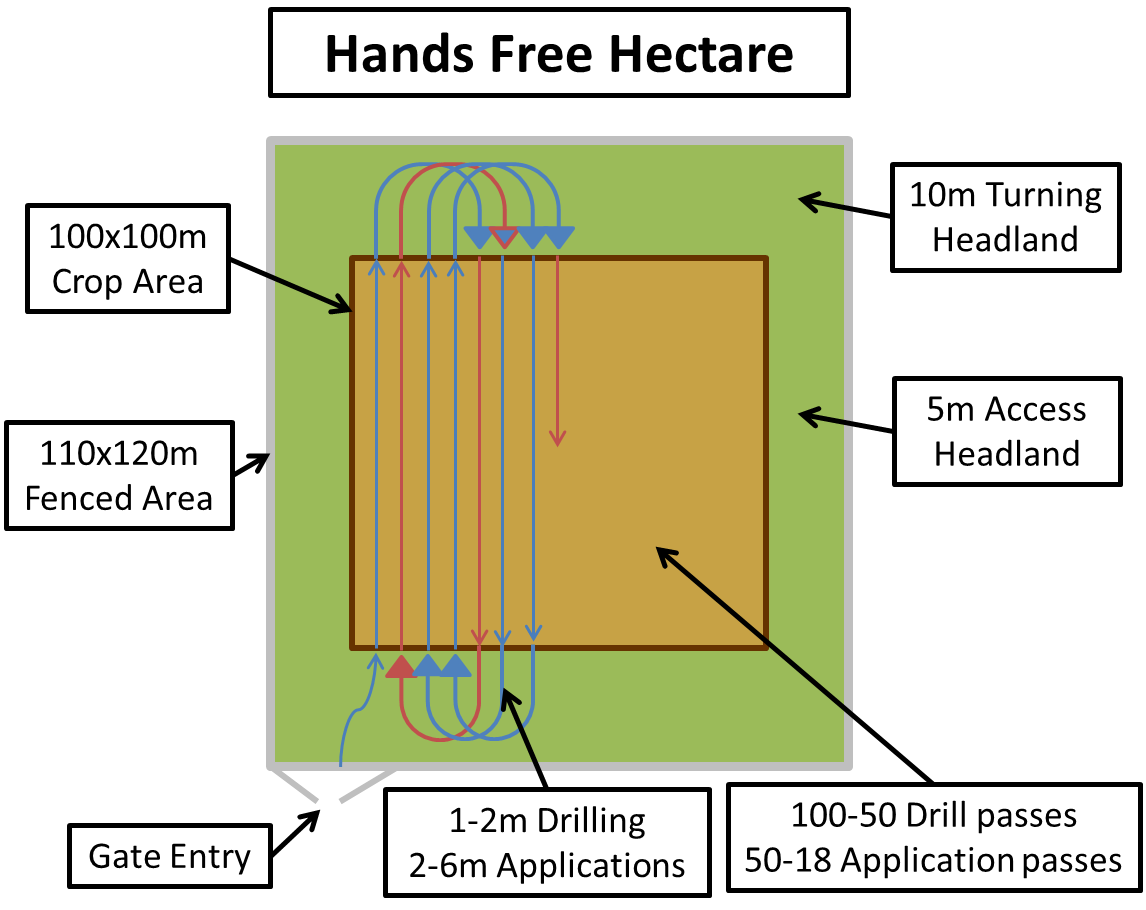
Hands Free Hectare – planned "perfect hectare"

On the 25th of April 2017, the project conducted its first major in field autonomous cropping task by drilling spring barley into the hectare. This was followed by autonomous rolling of the drilled crop on the 28th of April to which journalist and media were invited to attend, resulting in considerable coverage.

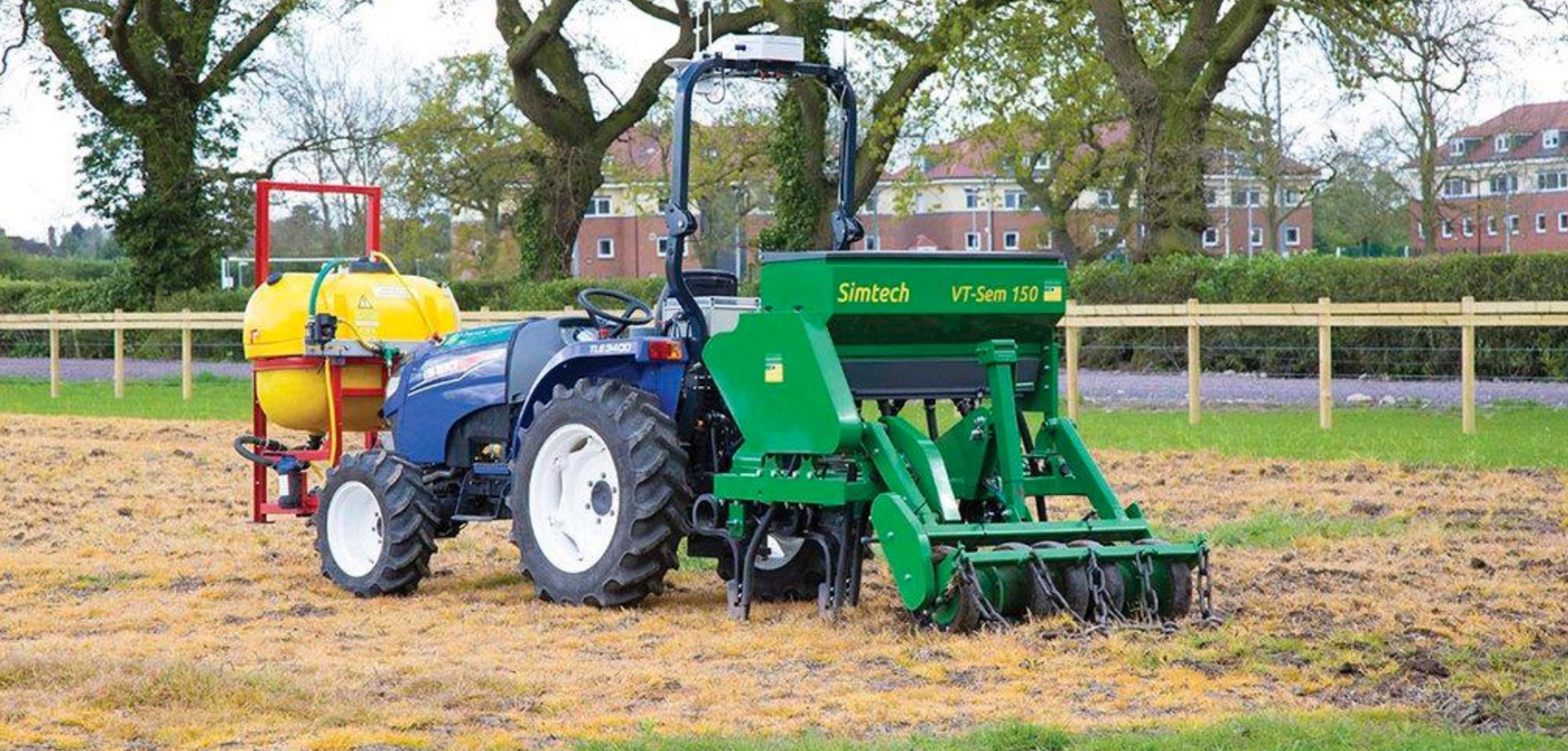
Autonomous Drilling in the Hands Free Hectare

In September 2017, the project met its goal to complete a fully autonomous cropping cycle when the spring barely was harvested. This is recognised as the point at which a world's first had been achieved; a key milestone for autonomous agriculture.

A total of ten autonomous field operations were conducted in the growing of the HFH spring barley. Alongside the autonomous field operations, all the agronomy for the HFH was conducted remotely by agronomist Kieran Walsh using information gathered by drones and ground scouting vehicles.

== Hands Free Hectare 2017–2018 ==
Following the success and positive reception to the HFH project, a follow on year was agreed and funded by the Agriculture and Horticulture Development Board (AHDB). The aim of this second year of the project was to iterate and improve the performance of the autonomous systems as well as looking to improve the techniques used to conduct remote agronomy.

The crop grown in the second year was winter wheat and the autonomous tractor was improved to allow for remote start up and control system changes enabling the tractor and combine to run simultaneously and unloading on the move. Reporting and videos from harvest can be seen in The Farmers Weekly.

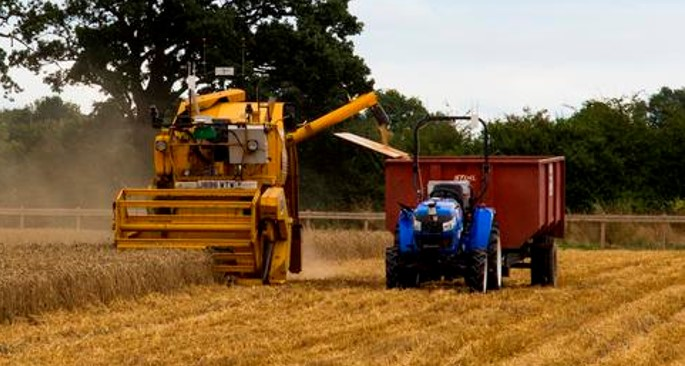
Autonomous Unload on the Move in the HFH 2018

== Project recognition and awards ==
In 2018 the HFH project won the Future Food award at the BBC Food and Farming Awards
