= Llywelyn (surname) =

Llywelyn or ap Llywelyn is a surname, and may refer to:

- Angharad ferch Llywelyn (fl.1260), daughter of Llywelyn ab Iorwerth, Prince of Wales
- Carmen Llywelyn, American actress and photographer
- Dafydd ap Llywelyn (1212–1246), King of Gwynedd
- Dafydd ap Llywelyn ap Madog, Welsh poet of the 16th-century
- Dafydd Llywelyn (composer) (1939–2013), Welsh pianist and composer
- Dafydd Llywelyn (politician) (born 1976), Welsh politician
- Desmond Llewelyn (1914–1999), Welsh actor
- Elen ferch Llywelyn (c. 1207–1253), daughter of Llywelyn the Great of Gwynedd
- Emyr Llywelyn, Welsh political activist
- Llywarch ap Llywelyn (fl.1173–1220), Welsh poet
- Madog ap Llywelyn (died after 1312), leader of the Welsh revolt of 1294–95
- Maredudd ap Llywelyn ap Maredudd ap Cynan, Welsh prince of the 13th century
- Morgan Llywelyn (born 1937), American-Irish author
- Owain ap Llywelyn ab y Moel (fl.1470–1500), Welsh poet from Powys
- Robin Llywelyn (born 1958), Welsh novelist

== See also ==
- Llywelyn (name)
- Llewellyn (surname)
- Llewelyn (surname)
- Lewellen (surname)
