= Faccenda Foods =

British poultry processor

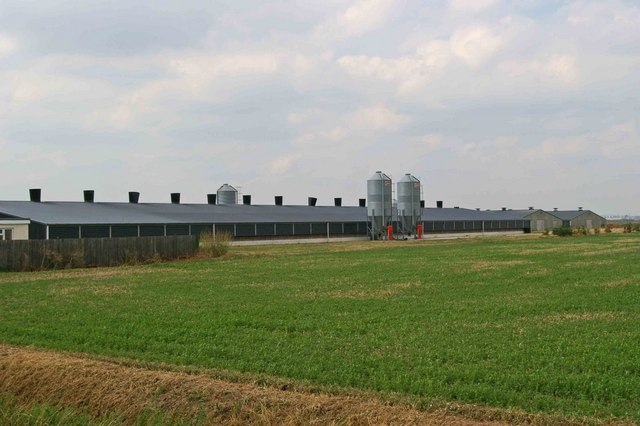
An industrial chicken farm operated by the Faccenda Group on Marsh Road east of Burnham-on-Crouch, England

Faccenda Foods Limited (until April 2014: Faccenda Group Limited) is a privately owned UK business established in 1962 by Robin Faccenda, which supplies fresh poultry products. In 2018, Faccenda and Cargill opened a joint venture, Avara Foods, to take over their UK fresh poultry businesses; it employs 6,000 people.

== Products ==
The vertically integrated business supplies chicken, turkey, duck meat, and related products to supermarkets, restaurants, and for export. Operations include egg-laying, hatching, processing, and distribution.

== History ==
The group was owned by Hillesden Investments Ltd, growing the business through the acquisitions of Hinton Poultry, Perry Poultry, and Webbs Country Foods. In 2005, it had an annual turnover of around £300m with 2,500 employees in 2005, and grew to a turnover of £365 million with a profit of £5 million in 2013. In 2007–2008 the Faccenda Group suffered a loss of £5 million. In 2008 it was the second-largest chicken processing company in the UK, capable of processing 2 million chickens per week.

Robin Faccenda, the chairman of Faccenda Group, invested £300,000 in a new student centre at Shropshire's Harper Adams agricultural college (now Harper Adams University), planned to open in 2010. A further £200,000 would fund a long-term programme of student financial support. In 2014, Robin and his family were listed by Farmers Weekly as the richest business within the UK poultry industry.

In 2017, Faccenda and Cargill announced a joint venture to take over their UK fresh poultry businesses. In 2018, after agreement by the Competition and Markets Authority, they announced the name of the joint venture, Avara Foods. It employs 6,000 people.

== Acquisitions and consolidation ==
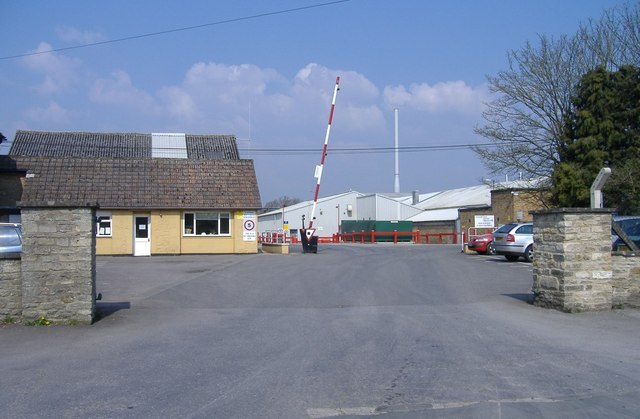
The Faccenda poultry processing plant in Sutton Benger, England closed in 2008

The purchase of the loss-making Webbs Country Foods in December 2000 required the closure of the Lymington, England factory. There was a loss of 500 jobs. However, 850 jobs were saved across the remaining three production facilities.

As part of a major consolidation, Faccenda closed the factory in Sutton Benger, England in 2008, with the loss of 450 jobs. All production was moved to Brackley. At the same time, £3 million was invested in the Brackley factory, and £2 million at its factories in Hortonwood (north Telford) and Dudley. In 2012 Faccenda bought Cranberry Foods, a turkey business in Scropton.

== Court cases ==
A case brought by Faccenda against a former sales manager, Faccenda Chicken v. Fowler [1986], is a key legal case in confidentiality and trade secrets. In 2002, the company was fined £75,000 for polluting the River Avon from its Sutton Benger plant. It was also fined £14,000 after a 17-year-old worker lost his little finger and ring finger after he reached into a machine through a gap in the guarding mesh. In 2003, police arrested 20 Brazilians working illegally at the plant. The Environment Agency found in 2006 that the smell from the Brackley plant fell outside limits under the Pollution Prevention and Control regulations.

In 2009, the company was fined £5000 under the Environmental Protection Act for incorrectly disposing of waste at Lyneham Farm, near Chippenham. The court heard that, in April 2008 a routine visit to the poultry unit by Environment Agency inspectors discovered that hazardous waste was being bought from other sites and incorrectly stored. A further inspection in October showed that hazardous waste including fluorescent light tubes, was still being stored, mixed with other waste, and then taken to a waste transfer site. The Environment Agency prosecutor told the court: "The defendant company consistently failed to comply with the advice given to it by the Environment Agency and tried to dispose of hazardous waste, despite being warned on previous occasions about the illegal mixing, storing, and transportation of hazardous wastes."
