= Thomas Wallace Fagan =

Welsh agricultural chemist

Thomas Wallace Fagan (4 February 1874 – 10 February 1951) was an agricultural chemist.

== Early life and education ==
Fagan was born 4 February 1874 at Talysarn, Caernarvonshire. He was the son of James Fagan and Katherine Griffiths. He started his education at his local school, continued at Denstone college and then moved onto Gonville & Caius college situated in Cambridge, England and graduated in 1898. After graduation, for a short time he became a chemistry master at Abertillery secondary school before going onto studying under two professors Winter and Dobbie at Bangor University. From then on, he had an extensive academic career.

== Academic career ==
- In 1904, appointed lecturer at Harper Adams Agricultural college, Salop.
- Lecturer at Edinburgh University, department of agriculture.
- In 1919, appointed as an adviser, by Aberystwyth University, in agricultural chemistry under the Ministry of Agriculture for the counties served by Aberystwyth University.
- In 1924, appointed head of the agricultural chemistry department at Aberystwyth University followed by a promotion to professor in 1931

He retired in 1939.

Fagan was one of the leading British scientists in the study of the chemistry of grass and its conservation, in collaboration with Welsh Plant Breeding station, 1919 and 1939. Due to his published articles (usually found in Welsh Journal of Agriculture), he demonstrated his ability, leadership and dedication as an agricultural scientist. His work showed clear analyses which was of tremendous value to the discovery of the nutritive value of grasses, clovers and other grassland plants. He continued his research to the end of his life but it failed to receive the attention it deserved due to his unassuming nature.

== Personal life ==
Fagan died 10 February 1951 in Aberystwyth and was buried in the town cemetery. He had been married to Helena Teresa Hughes and they had one son.
