= Tony Llewellyn-Jones =

Australian actor

- Born: 1949 (age 76–77); London, England
- Occupation: Actor
- Known for: Picnic at Hanging Rock
- Parent(s): Dr. Derek Llewellyn-Jones; Elisabeth Kirkby

Tony Llewellyn-Jones (born 1949) is a British-born Australian actor. He was nominated for the 1976 AFI Award for Best Actor in a Supporting Role for his role in Picnic at Hanging Rock.

== Biography ==
Llewellyn-Jones was born in London, England, in 1949 and lived in Singapore, Kuala Lumpur and Zimbabwe before moving to Australia in 1965. He is the son of Dr Derek Llewellyn-Jones and Elisabeth Kirkby. He has performed in films (Picnic at Hanging Rock), on television (a long-running role on G.P.), and on stage (working with Melbourne Theatre Company, Sydney Theatre Company and Bell Shakespeare).
