= Llywarch =

Llywarch is a given name. Notable people with the name include:

- Llywarch Hen (6th century), Brythonic prince and poet
- Llywarch ap Hyfaidd (died c. 904), king of Dyfed
- Llywarch ap Llywelyn (fl. 1173–1220), medieval Welsh poet.
- Llywarch Llaety (fl. 1140–1160), Welsh court poet
- Llywarch Reynolds (1843–1916), Welsh solicitor and scholar
