= Llewellyn-Smith =

Llewellyn-Smith is a surname. Notable people with the surname include:

- David Llewellyn-Smith (born 1967), Australian writer and independent publisher
- Elizabeth Llewellyn-Smith (born 1934) British academic administrator
- Michael Llewellyn-Smith (born 1939), British diplomat and academic
- Michael Llewellyn-Smith (architect) (born 1942), Australian architect and city planner
