= Harper Adams University =

Public university in Telford and Wrekin, UK

- Coat of Arms
- Former name: Harper Adams Agricultural College
- Motto: Utile Dulci (Latin)
- Motto in English: Useful and agreeable
- Type: Public
- Established: 1901: as Harper Adams Agricultural College; 1998: gained University college status 2012: gained University Status
- Chancellor: The Princess Royal
- Vice-Chancellor: Ken Sloan
- Students: 5,285 (2024/25)
- Undergraduates: 4,640 (2024/25)
- Postgraduates: 650 (2024/25)
- Other students: 60 FE
- Location: Edgmond, Shropshire, TF10 8NB, United Kingdom; 52°46′47″N 2°25′39″W
- Website: www.harper-adams.ac.uk

Harper Adams University is a land-based public university in Edgmond, Shropshire, United Kingdom. Established in 1901 as Harper Adams College, Harper Adams University gained university status in 2012 and is a member of the Land Based Colleges Aspiring to Excellence (Landex).

== History ==
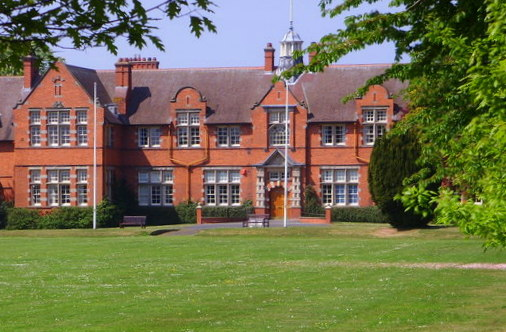
The university's main building

Harper Adams College, which would become the university, was founded in 1901. Its first principal was Headworth Foulkes (1901–1922). Thomas Harper Adams, a wealthy Shropshire gentleman farmer, died in 1892, bequeathing the estate which was the original foundation. The college had just six students to begin with.

In 1909 a specialist poultry husbandry was created.

During the First World War, Harper Adams remained open, and in 1915 the first women were admitted into the college on wartime farm courses. Harper Adams was the first institute to do so, and in 1916 women were admitted as full-time students onto a wide variety of courses. Approximately, 200 staff and former students served during the war and 40 are known to have died as a result. In 2015, 10 additional names were added to the university's memorial board, after previously unrecorded alumni were also discovered to have been killed in action. A board in the Old Library listing the names of those killed was dedicated in March 2015, crafted by Peter Nunn of the university's estate department, and a new memorial garden was also created outside the library.

The agricultural depression of the 1920s onward led to a drop in student numbers. In 1922, Charles Crowther (1922–1944) became Principal and efforts were taken to ensure the College stayed open. The National Institute of Poultry Husbandry opened in 1926, giving Harper a high profile in areas of teaching and research. The college remained open during the Second World War. Bill Price (1946–1962) became Principal in 1946 and student numbers steadily rose to 222. The Jubilee Hostel was opened in 1951.

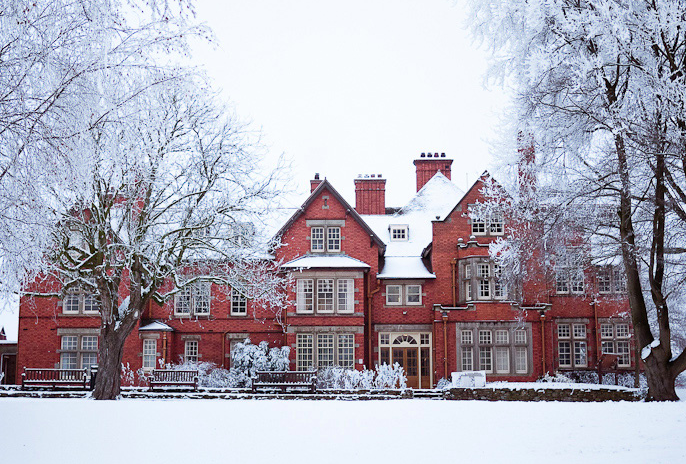
A wintertime view from the university's west lawn

Reginald Kenny was principal from 1962 until 1977, followed by Tony Harris from 1977 until 1994. In 1964, the funding of the college was passed from the Ministry of Agriculture to the Department of Education and Science. The first Higher National Diploma students were enrolled in 1969. Degree courses were first introduced in 1981; Harper Adams was one of the first institutions to introduce a BSc. sandwich course. The CNAA granted Harper Adams the authority to validate its own courses. In 1985, the science building was opened by Princess Margaret.

Student numbers passed 1000 for the first time in 1991. In 1994, three new student residences were opened. Wynn Jones became principal in 1996, and later that year the Privy Council granted the university degree awarding powers. In 1998, Harper Adams gained the title of University College. In 2004, Harper Adams was awarded £2.1 million in funding to develop its work with rural businesses. Harper Adams gained the power to award research degrees in 2006 and shortly after, a new Biomass Hall was opened. David Llewellyn was appointed principal in 2009. That September, a new £2.3 million dairy unit was opened and in December, a £3 million Regional Food Academy (RFA) was officially opened by The Princess Royal. In 2010, Nick Herbert opened a Postgraduate and Professional Development Centre, and in the same year the Faccenda student centre and a new student hall of residence were opened. An anaerobic digester opened in 2011, which is expected to offset three times the carbon emissions of the university annually. It won a Renewable Energy Infrastructure Award. Ken Sloan was appointed Vice-Chancellor of Harper Adams University in 2021, its eighth institutional leader.

Bamford Library, opened in 2003

Harper Adams is an academic sponsor of the JCB Academy, which opened in 2010. JCB Academy was the first university technical college to be established in England.

In December 2012, Harper Adams had the title 'university' conferred upon it. This ended the institution's long history of being a college and consequently, Harper Adams became Shropshire's first university.

In 2020, the University received its first student intake to Harper and Keele Veterinary School, a new joint venture with Keele University offering a BVetMS degree.

== Campus ==
The campus is on farm land on the outskirts of Edgmond near Newport, Shropshire. Over the last decade more than £45 million has been invested in the campus. Harper Adams operates a 635 hectare (1569 acres) commercial farm on campus. Undergraduate students live on campus in one of 15 halls.

The university provides more than 50 foundation, undergraduate and postgraduate degree programmes to students from over 30 countries. The university is set within a 550 hectare (1360 acre) working farm.

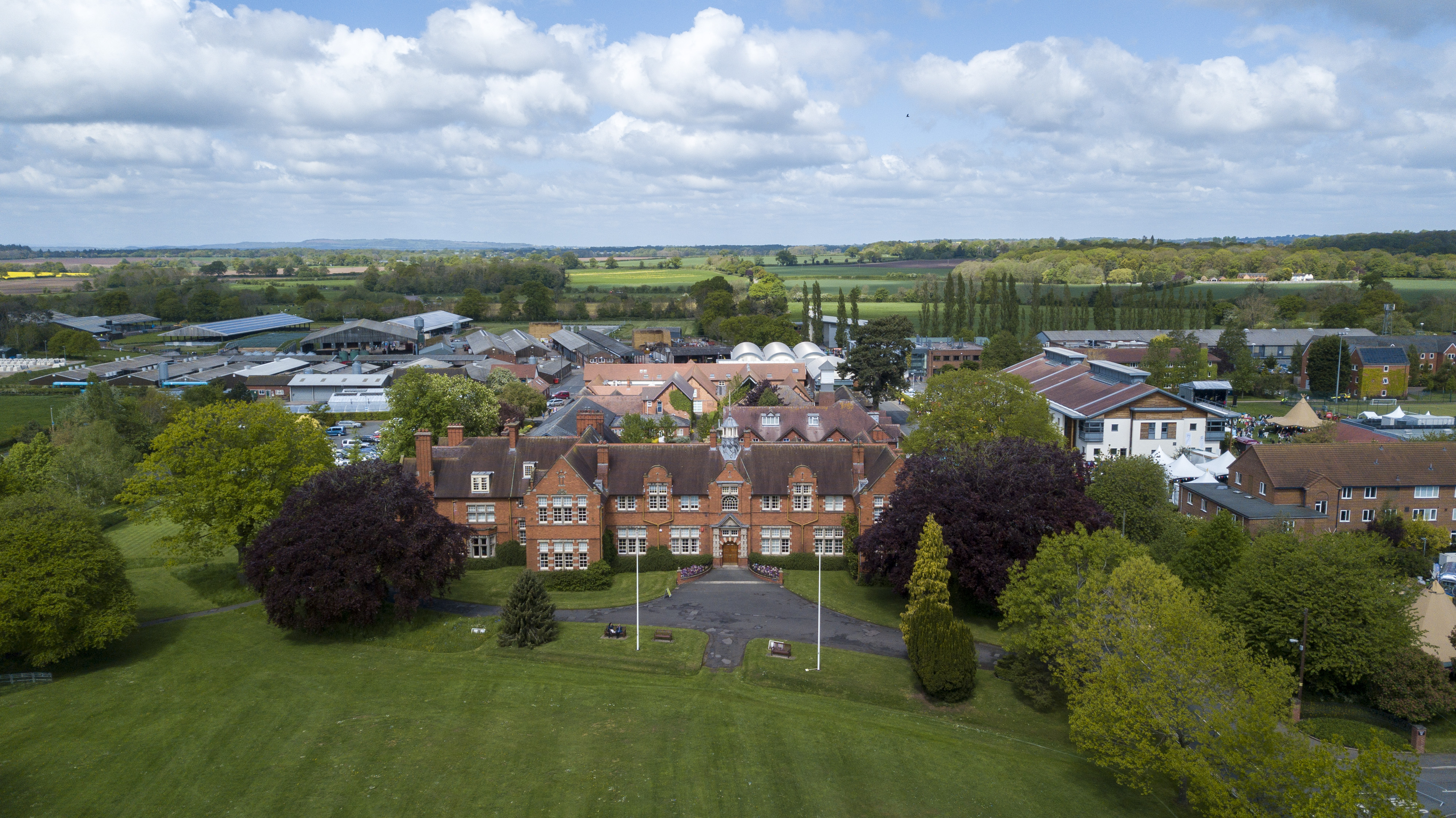
The university's main campus, seen from above

== Organisation and administration ==
=== Academic departments ===
Undergraduate courses are offered via 5 academic departments and courses fall under 10 broad subject areas

- Agriculture
- Animal Sciences (behaviour and welfare)
- Business and Agri-Food
- Environment, Sustainability and Wildlife
- Engineering
- Food Science, Technology and Innovation
- Land and Property Management
- Veterinary Nursing
- Veterinary Physiotherapy
- Zoology

=== Governance ===
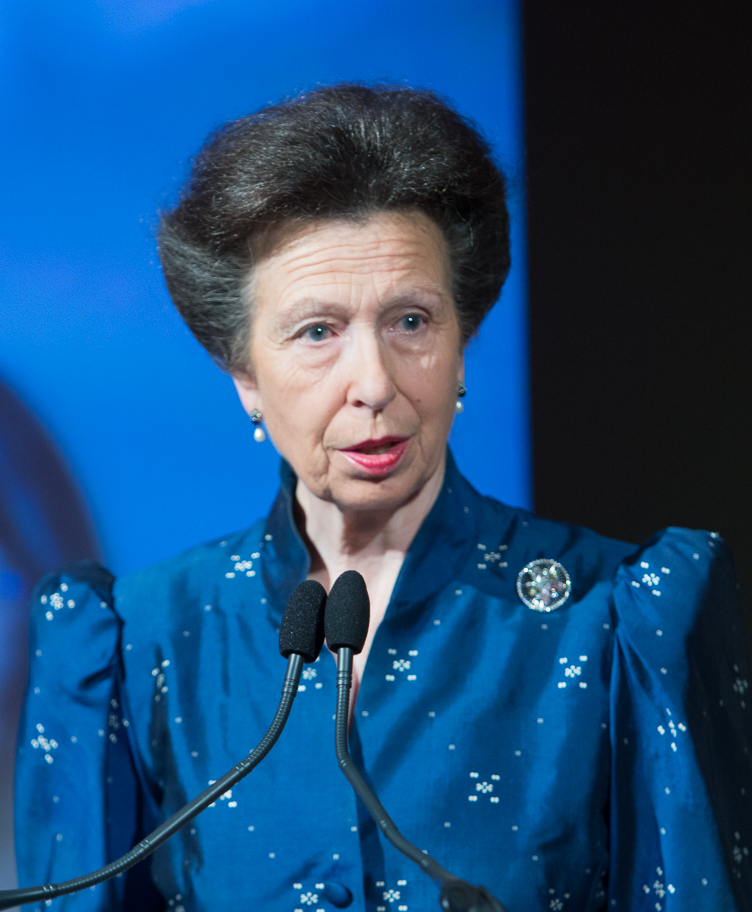
Anne, Princess Royal, Chancellor of Harper Adams University

The Chancellor of Harper Adams University has been Princess Anne since 2013. This is a ceremonial role.

College Principals and University Vice-Chancellors

- Hedworth Foulkes (1901–1922)
- Charles Crowther (1922–1944)
- Bill Price (1946–1962)
- Reginald Kenney (1962–1977)
- Tony Harris (1977–1994)
- Graham McConnell (1994-1996)
- Wynne Jones (1996–2009)
- David Llewelyn (2009–2021): the role was renamed Vice-Chancellor on full university status being conferred in 2012.
- Ken Sloan (2021–present)

== Academic profile ==
=== Research ===
In 2014 Harper Adams University has been recognised for the quality of its research by the Research Excellence Framework.

Areas of research include; management of soil and water, crop disease resistance, agricultural technology, livestock carbon footprint reduction, genetic approaches to improving food quality, bioenergy and renewable sources, agricultural landscape biodiversity, pedagogy and animal welfare.

Research facilities

Facilities for the university's research work include:

- Elizabeth Creak Building
- Princess Margaret Science Laboratories
- Jean Jackson Entomology Building
- Crop and Environment Research Centre
- Dairy Crest Innovation Centre
- Poultry Research Unit
- Regional Food Academy

==== Hands Free Hectare ====
Since 2016 the "Hands Free Hectare" project within the engineering department has been developing robotic farming operations.

=== Reputation and rankings ===
Rankings
National rankings
- Complete (2027): 47
- Times / Sunday Times (2027): 67

Global rankings
- QS (2027): 1401+

In 2016 Harper Adams University was voted university of the year by WhatUni. The university received The Queen's Anniversary Prize for Further and Higher Education, Innovative applications in agricultural engineering and technologies to address UK and global food security, in 2017.

The 2020 Graduate Outcomes survey showed 98.8% were in work or further study 15 months after completing their studies.

==== Sunday Times ====
- UK University of the Year, runner up 2020
- Top 20 Universities, (ranked 17th) 2019,
- Best Modern University, 2017 and 2019
- Top 50 UK Universities, 2011.
- Best University College, 2008, 2009, 2010, 2011, 2012

==== Times Higher Education ====
- UK's Best Modern University, 2017.
- 1st Student Experience, 2017

== Student life ==
=== Sports ===
Harper Adams has a variety of sports clubs, including rugby, shooting, football, hockey, fencing, netball, polo, tug of war, basketball, motorsport, off-roading, rowing, running, field sports, equestrian and mountain biking. The university competes in the British Universities and Colleges Sport leagues and championships.

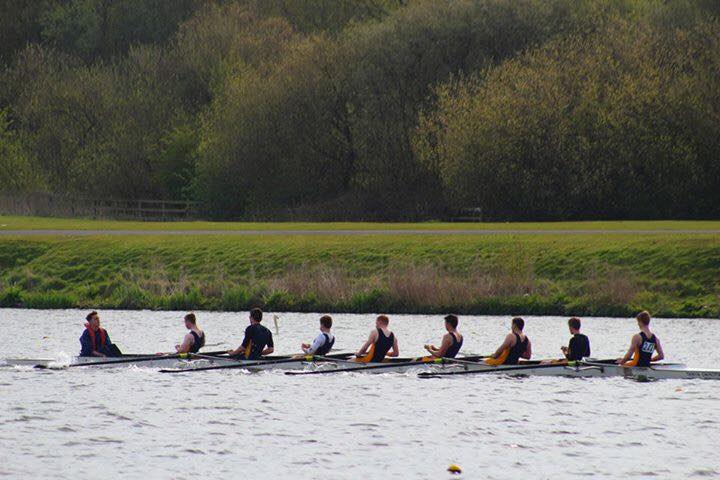
Harper Adams University Men's 1st VIII at BUCS, Summer 2016

Harper Adams University Boat Club (HAURC) is located at Pengwern Boat Club on the River Severn in Shrewsbury. Members compete in the BUCS Rowing League, local regattas. The club's registered blades are dark blue, cyan and gold.

Harper Adams University Clay Shooting Club (HAUSC) is the largest club in the university with over 100 members. The club competes in local competitions, BUCS League, the Countryside Alliance Cirencester Cup Competition and also holds private matches against the Royal Agricultural University and St Andrews University. In 2011 and 2012, the HAUSC won the national title at the BUCS Clay Pigeon Shooting Championships. The HAUSC is often linked with, but is separate from the HAUFSS (Harper Adams University Field Sports Society)

The Motorsport Team has its own VW Golf GTi rally car and Ford Fiesta R2 National. In January 2017, the team announced a partnership with the M-Sport World Rally Team. The team regularly competes in BRC events.

== Coat of arms and flag ==
The arms of the university are those of the Harper Adams family, which were formally transferred to the university by letters patent presented in May 2018 Rouge Croix Pursuivant, of the College of Arms in May 2018. As a banner of arms these are in use as the university flag.

The arms appear in stained glass in the main building.

== Notable people ==
=== Notable alumni ===
- Jorian Jenks (1899–1963), English farmer, environmentalism pioneer and fascist
- Thomas Herbert Elliot Jackson (1903–1968), a coffee farmer in Kenya and entomologist
- Barbara Woodhouse (1910–1988), dog and horse trainer, author, TV personality.
- Robin Faccenda (born 1937), businessman in the poultry industry
- Michael Paget-Wilkes (1941-2026), Archdeacon of Warwick 1990–2009
- Rob Strachan (born 1960), heir presumptive to the Mill of Strachan
- Helen Browning (born 1961), organic livestock and arable farmer in Wiltshire
- Rachael Hamilton (born 1970), British politician, MSP for Ettrick, Roxburgh and Berwickshire
- Julian Sturdy (born 1971), farmer and former MP for York Outer
- Sarah Dyke (born 1971), Liberal Democrat MP for Glastonbury and Somerton
- Scott Bemand (born 1978), retired English rugby union player
- Christopher Borrett (born 1979), English cricketer
- Boyd Rankin (born 1984), Irish cricketer

=== Notable governors ===
- Sir Beville Stanier, 1st Baronet (1867–1921), politician and landowner.
- Sir William Arthur Colegate (1884–1956), Conservative party MP for Burton and Uttoxeter
- Francis Fitzherbert, 15th Baron Stafford (born 1954), a politician, educator and landowner,

=== Honorary degree and fellowship holders ===
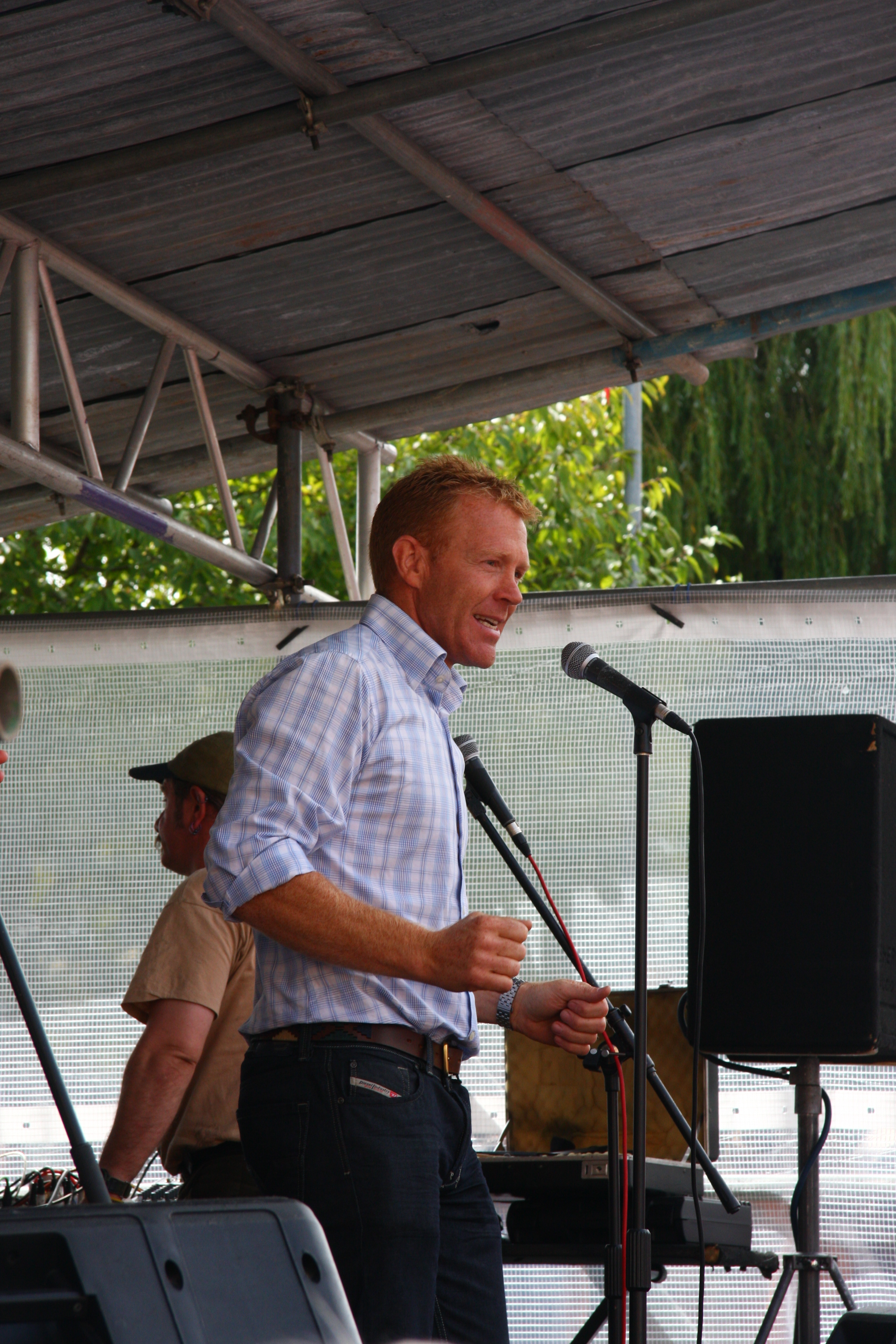
Adam Henson holds an honorary degree from the university.

- Adam Henson
- Richard Scott, 10th Duke of Buccleuch and 12th Duke of Queensbury
- Julia Slingo
- Hugh Pennington
- Jimmy Doherty
- Anthony Bamford, Chairman of JCB
- Baroness Hazel Byford DBE, Conservative bench and Shadow Minister
- Peter Kendall, NFU President
- Gerald Grosvenor, 6th Duke of Westminster
- John Beddington
- Justin King, Chief Executive of J Sainsbury PLC
- Geoffrey Davies, Managing Director of Alamo Group Europe Ltd
- The Princess Royal

=== Notable staff ===
- Thomas Wallace Fagan (1874–1951), an agricultural chemist, appointed lecturer in 1904
- Charles Crowther (1876–1964), principal of Harper Adams Agricultural College from 1922 to 1944.
- F. P. Raynham (1893–1954) Office worker at the Harper Adams Agricultural College in 1909, became a pioneering pilot
- Eric Vernon Watson (1914–1999), bryologist, senior lecturer at Harper Adams Agricultural College, 1941 to 1946.
- Simon Leather (1955-2021), Professor of Entomology at Harper Adams University, aphid specialist
- David Llewellyn (born 1960) Vice-Chancellor of Harper Adams University from 2009 to 2021

== In popular culture ==
Ruth Archer, a character played by English actress Felicity Finch in the BBC Radio 4 soap opera The Archers, attended Harper Adams University College as part of her fictional backstory.
