= Frank Llewellyn-Jones =

Welsh scientist

Frank Llewellyn-Jones, CBE (30 September 1907 – 3 February 1997) was a Welsh scientist, and Head of the Department of Physics at the University College of Swansea from 1945 to 1965. From 1965 to 1974, he was Principal of the University College of Swansea, and was Vice-Chancellor of the University of Wales from 1969 to 1971.

== Early life and education ==
Born in 1907 in Penrhiwceiber, South Wales, Frank Llewellyn-Jones was educated at West Monmouth School. He was a lifelong railway enthusiast and contributed articles to railway journals in his free time.

In 1925, he won a scholarship to Merton College, Oxford University, where he earned a First Class Honours Degree in Physics. His research career then began as a Senior Demy at Magdalen College, Oxford, where he completed his DPhil, and during which he spent three years on post-graduate research.

== Academic career ==
Llewellyn-Jones was the author of around 70 scientific papers and of five books, including the Methuen monograph, Ionization and Breakdown in Gases (1957).

During World War II, he was appointed a Senior Scientific Officer at the Royal Aircraft Establishment at Farnborough, UK, where he worked on ignition systems for high-altitude piston-powered aircraft; he was subsequently awarded the first Ragnar Holm Achievement Award for Research on Electrical Contacts in 1972.

=== Vice Chancellor of the University of Wales ===
In 1961, Llewellyn-Jones was appointed Acting Principal of the University College of Swansea, was subsequently appointed Principal in 1965, and became Vice-Chancellor of the University of Wales in 1969.

Llewellyn-Jones's leadership across the 1950s and 1960s was pioneering, especially in his focus on research, and produced a number of notable scientists, including Malcolm Jones and Lyn Evans, the designer of the Large Hadron Collider at CERN.

== Public service ==
In his home town of Swansea, Llewellyn-Jones developed links between Swansea and CERN, and was invited to write six different articles on Physics to the South Wales Evening Post. In 1951 he was appointed by the Privy Council to the Radio Research Board, was given the post of Scientific Advisor for Civil Defence for Wales by the Home Office, and was elected to the Council of the Physical Society of Great Britain. He served as Vice President to the Council from 1955-59. He was President of the Royal Institution of South Wales between 1957 and 1960.

== Personal life ==
In 1938, Llewellyn-Jones married Eileen Davies, a founding actress of the Swansea Little Theatre, who served on the Welsh Committee of the Arts Council of Great Britain and as the President of the Swansea and District Association of the British Federation of University Women.

They had two children, including a son, David (b. 1940), who became Professor of Earth Observation Science at the University of Leicester.
