= Llewellin =

Llewellin is a Welsh surname derived from the personal name Llwelyn. Notable people with the surname include:

- Ben Llewellin (born 1994), Welsh sports shooter
- David Llewellin (born 1960), Welsh rally driver
- John Llewellin, 1st Baron Llewellin GBE, PC, MC, TD (1893–1957), British army officer, Conservative Party politician
- Llewelyn Llewellin (died 1878), the first Dean of St David's Cathedral
- Philip Llewellin (1940–2005), British journalist and writer
- Richard Llewellin (born 1938), retired Anglican bishop in the Church of England

== See also ==
- Llewellin Setter, strain of English setters bred by R.L. Purcell Llewellin to be perfect for foot hunting and early field trials
- Llewelen
- Llywelyn
