= Joe Durrell =

English footballer

Personal information
- Full name: Joseph Timothy Durrell
- Date of birth: 15 March 1953 (age 73)
- Place of birth: Stepney, England
- Position: Winger

Senior career*
Years	Team	Apps	(Gls)
1970–1973	West Ham United	6	(0)
1973–1975	Bristol City	8	(0)
1975	→ Cardiff City (loan)	2	(0)
1975–1977	Gillingham	49	(9)
Total		65	(9)
- * Club domestic league appearances and goals

Joseph Timothy Durrell (born 15 March 1953) is an English former professional footballer who played as a winger for West Ham United, Bristol City, Cardiff City and Gillingham between 1971 and 1977. He finished his career at semi-professional Dagenham F.C. where he won the FA Trophy at Wembley in 1980.

After retiring as a professional footballer he worked in Tower Hamlets as a teacher for 25 years until his retirement in 2015. He currently lives in Stepney.
