= Derek Llewellyn-Jones =

Australian gynaecologist and author

Derek Llewellyn-Jones OBE
- Born: John Derek Llewellyn-Jones; 29 April 1923; Wallasey, Merseyside, England, United Kingdom
- Died: 28 November 1997 (aged 74); Sydney, New South Wales, Australia
- Education: University of Sydney
- Occupations: Gynaecologist and author
- Spouse(s): Elisabeth Kirkby, Suzanne Llewellyn-Jones
- Children: 4 including Tony Llewellyn-Jones

John Derek Llewellyn-Jones OBE (29 April 1923 – 28 November 1997) was an English-Australian gynaecologist and medical author. He was also a broadcaster for Radio Malaya.

== Biography ==
Llewellyn-Jones was born in Wallasey, Merseyside, England, to a Welsh father and Irish mother. His paternal grandfather, Frederick Llewellyn-Jones, was a politician for the Liberal Party. He was brought up in Hawarden, North Wales, then attended Chester Kings School in Chester, and studied obstetrics at the University of Dublin. He was conscripted to the army, and served in the Royal Army Medical Corps in the United Kingdom and subsequently in Malaya.

Llewellyn-Jones emigrated to Australia in 1965 where he was an associate professor of Department of Obstetrics and Gynaecology at the University of Sydney for 23 years. He became a naturalised Australian citizen in 1976.

He wrote Everywoman, the textbook Fundamentals of Obstetrics and Gynaecology, Everyman and Everygirl.

He was married to politician and actress Elisabeth Kirkby they have three children born in 1949 a (son), who is an actor, 1952 (daughter) who is an actress, and 1955 (son) respectively.

He was appointed an Officer of the Order of the British Empire (OBE) in the 1964 Birthday Honours.

== Bibliography (selected) ==
- Volume 1 – Fundamentals of Obstetrics and Gynaecology (original: 1969; edition 2: 1977)
- Volume 2 – Gynaecology (1970, 1978)
- Everywoman – A Gynaecological Guide for Life (edition 1: 1971; edition 2: 1978)
- Human Reproduction and Society (1974)
- Zero Population Growth ("versus" Dr. Colin Clarke; part of the On Trial book series: 1974)
- Sex and Venereal Disease (1975)
