= Robin Faccenda =

British businessman (born 1937)

Robin Michael Faccenda OBE (born 21 June 1937) is a businessman in the poultry industry. According to the 2005 Sunday Times Rich List, he was the 654th richest man in Britain with a combined wealth of £75m. As of 2008, The Sunday Times valued his wealth at £45m.

== Early life ==
He gained a National Diploma in Poultry from Harper Adams College in 1961.

== Career ==
He is the chairman of the Faccenda Group, formerly the second largest Chicken processor in the UK, and owner of its parent company Hillesden Investments Ltd. In 2018, Faccenda Foods and Cargill opened a joint venture to take over their U.K. fresh poultry businesses, Avara Foods, employing 6,000 people.

He previously owned several other businesses, including Direct Legal & Collections, a debt collection agency.

Faccenda was appointed Officer of the Order of the British Empire (OBE) in the 2023 New Year Honours for services to the UK poultry industry and education.

== See also ==
- Bernard Matthews
