= William Llewellyn (priest) =

William Llewellyn (18 October 1830 – 1907) was an Anglican priest in the second half of the 19th and the early part of the 20th century, most notably Archdeacon of Port Elizabeth from 1892 to 1907.

Llewellyn was born in the Isle of Man on 18 October 1830, and educated at Trinity College, Dublin. He was ordained deacon in 1856, and priest in 1857. He was for many years the incumbent at st Katharine, Uitenhage. He died in Cradock in 1907.
