= Dafydd ap Llewelyn =

Dafydd ap Llewelyn, in the Welsh language, means "David, son of Llewelyn", and there have been several notable people known by this patronymic, including

- Dafydd ap Llywelyn (1215–1246), Prince of Gwynedd and first Prince of Wales
- Dafydd Gam (1380–1415), Welsh soldier and nobleman who died at the Battle of Agincourt

== See also ==
- David Llewellyn (disambiguation)
- Llywelyn ap Dafydd (c. 1267 – 1287), de jure Prince of Gwynedd 1283–1287
