= David Llewellyn (academic administrator) =

British academic administrator

David George Llewellyn, CBE (born 14 December 1960) was Vice-Chancellor of Harper Adams University from 2009 to 2021.

Born in Cardiff, he was educated at University College London (BSc), Birkbeck, University of London (MSc) and the University of Bath (DBA).

Llewellyn was appointed Commander of the Order of the British Empire (CBE) in the 2022 New Year Honours for services to higher education, the agri-food chain and rural industries.
