= Paul Heffer =

English footballer

Personal information
- Full name: Paul Victor Heffer
- Date of birth: 21 December 1947 (age 78)
- Place of birth: West Ham, England
- Position: Defender

Youth career
- –1966: West Ham United

Senior career*
Years	Team	Apps	(Gls)
1966–1972	West Ham United	15	(0)
- Cambridge City

Managerial career
- Southend Manor
- * Club domestic league appearances and goals as of 16:26, 17 February 2012 (UTC)

Paul Victor Heffer (born 21 December 1947) is an English former footballer who played as a defender for West Ham United.

== Club career ==
Heffer started as a junior for West Ham United making his professional debut on 18 March 1967 in a 1–0 away defeat to Nottingham Forest. He made only fifteen appearances for West Ham before his footballing career was cut short by injury in 1972. He was awarded a testimonial match on 4 April 1973 in which a West Ham side beat an Israeli side 3–2. Heffer later played semi-professionally with Cambridge City.

== Coaching career ==
Following his playing career, Heffer managed Southend Manor during the 1980s, also taking up a chairman role at the club during the late-1980s before being replaced as chairman by Simon Dibley in 1990. Heffer later returned to West Ham, becoming an academy coach, before making the step up to assistant academy director.
