= Edward Llewellyn-Thomas =

English psychologist (1917–1984)

Edward Llewellyn-Thomas (15 December 1917 – 5 July 1984) was an English scientist, university professor and, writing as Edward Llewellyn, a science fiction author. Llewellyn-Thomas published sixty scientific articles on psychology and eye movement over the course of his life. Active in the field of pharmacology, he took interest in the ethical development of biomedical science. His Douglas Convolution science fiction series concerns the breakdown of civilization after most of a generation is born sterile as a side effect of a widely used anti-cancer medication.

== Biography ==
Born in Salisbury, England, Llewellyn-Thomas graduated with a degree in electrical engineering from the University of London shortly before the start of World War II. At the war's outbreak in 1939, at the age of 21 he joined the British Army. As a specialist in radar and communications he served with the Royal Electrical and Mechanical Engineers and saw action in North Africa and the Far East. Rising to the rank of captain, he subsequently spent time in Gibraltar and was the officer on the island responsible for communications.

Subsequent to the war he was attached to the British War Office, and it was while he was attending a Staff College course in Virginia that he met his wife Ellen. He was demobilized from the army in 1947 − the same year that he married Ellen. For a time, he was posted in Malaysia and stayed on in Singapore to work in telecommunications. While in Singapore he decided to pursue training in Medicine. In 1951 Llewellyn-Thomas moved with his wife to Montreal, where he entered McGill Medical School. While in medical school, Llewellyn-Thomas was employed as an Electrical Engineer at the Montreal Neurological Institute where he worked with Carl Jasper and Wilder Penfield, who, at that time were engaged in their pioneering work on mapping the electrical activity of the brain.

Following graduation from McGill, he interned at the Queen Elizabeth Hospital in Montreal and during that time decided to work as a general practitioner in a small community, in order to experience as much as he could of the breadth of the practice of medicine. For two years, he practiced on a small island in the Bay of Fundy, often traveling in a fishing boat to other islands to visit patients. Working in these isolated conditions, it was often necessary to handle difficult medical cases without immediate help.

It was during this time that he also worked as a Research Associate in the Department of Social Psychiatry of Cornell University, taking part in a major project designed to study psychiatric illness in small communities. An opportunity to work on man and the environment related to aerospace medicine attracted him, and the family moved to Toronto in 1958, where he joined the Defense Research Medical Laboratory. Here he initiated research into human eye movements. He also explored various aspects of aerospace medicine, psycho-pharmacology, and how man responded to his environment. Along with Norman H. Mackworth he designed a head-mounted camera to record eye movements. He used this to study eye movements under a variety of physical conditions, such as driving an automobile, flying a small aeroplane, or perusing art. Subsequent to his appointment as associate director of the then Institute of Biomedical Electronics, a picture of a much improved version of this camera was used as the front-cover for an issue of Scientific American (August 1968). In this issue, he was the author of a full description of the camera design and its application in a variety of studies that he and his graduate students at the Institute continued to conduct.

He joined the University of Toronto as a part-time lecturer in pharmacology in 1959 and became a full-time member of the faculty in 1963, and here pursued his research in pharmacology and biomedical engineering. He was appointed as the first associate director of the Institute of Biomedical Electronics that had been established in 1962 under the direction of Norman Moody. In this capacity he provided a direct link to the Faculty of Medicine as well as to the associated medical research groups in the surrounding hospitals. These were responsible for establishing new interdisciplinary research projects for the Institute staff and graduate students.

In Llewellyn-Thomas' introductory lectures to a course on Biomedical Engineering, introduced by the Institute around 1967, he presented basic physiology from an engineering perspective. He also introduced an Internship course in which graduate students in the Institute spent time in hospital departments experiencing first-hand some of the problems faced by these departments. He was responsible for supervising a number of graduate students, some of whom themselves became academics. Llewellyn-Thomas' interests are reflected in the range of academic appointments he held. In addition to his appointment in Pharmacology and the Institute he had a professorial appointment in the Faculty of Applied Science and the department of Electrical Engineering. At one time he was a lecturer in design in the Ontario College of Art & Design and a professor in the psychology department of the University of Waterloo, where he taught the first course in Canada on human factors in engineering. He also pursued his clinical interests and held appointments in the Department of Family and Community Medicine at Women's College Hospital and in the department of anesthesia at the Toronto General Hospital.

He was the author or co-author of sixty scientific papers, and in addition was a co-editor of the first comprehensive text on biomedical engineering. About six years prior to his retirement he commenced writing science fiction books. Six of these were published under the pseudonym of Edward Llewellyn. He was a member of the Canadian writers' group the Bunch of Seven prior to its formalization. He also published a number of poems written in Welsh. He was a member of the Institute of Electrical Engineers and at the same time a member of the Royal Society of Arts. He was a member of the Human Factors Association of Canada and served a term as the President of that organization. In 1974 he won the Engineering Medal, an award from the Association of Professional Engineers. He served as consultant to the Royal Ontario Museum, the Ontario Science Centre, the World Health Organization, the National Research Council, the Medical Research Council, the Defense Research Board of Canada, the National Design Council, and several other major firms and government agencies in Canada and the United States. His election as a Fellow of the Royal Society of Canada was in recognition of his contributions to science. He was a member of the Canadian Medical and Biological Engineering Society (CMBES) and was awarded Fellow of the CMBES in 1976.

Always active, at the time of his death he was preparing a submission to the Federal Commission investigating the Ocean Ranger disaster. Throughout his career he was known as an excellent lecturer, but in addition he developed a genuine interest in undergraduate teaching. Not only was he interested in teaching and the curriculum, he was interested in the individuals involved in the process, the teachers and the students. His particular talents with people, students especially, were recognized in 1974 when he was appointed Associate Dean, Student Affairs, a position he occupied with distinction until his retirement.

=== Death ===
Edward Llewellyn-Thomas died 5 July 1984, only a few days after his retirement as Associate Dean for Student Affairs, Faculty of Medicine, University of Toronto. He was survived by his wife Ellen and their three children Caroline, Roland, and Ned.

=== Family ===
His daughter, Caroline Llewellyn, was also a published author. His son, Roland Llewellyn, has been a longtime performer with the New York-based band Banji, a DIY musical project that originated at C-Squat and explores dance, new wave, art pop, worldbeat, and avant-funk.

== Bibliography ==
=== Scientific papers ===
- K.C. Anderson, G.H. Ues, K.C. Smith, E. Llewellyn-Thomas. "An eye-position controlled typewriter" (1976). Digest of the 11th International Conference of Medical Biological Engineering.
- Llewellyn-Thomas, Edward. "Movements of the eye" (1968). Scientific American 219. (Cover story)
- Llewellyn-Thomas, Edward. "Fight--or Ultimately Die", Science, 8 November 1968,162: 620
- Llewellyn-Thomas, Edward. "The Future of Computers in Anaesthesia", Canadian Journal of Anesthesia, Vol 15, 519-527
- Llewellyn-Thomas, Edward. "The Prevalence of Psychiatric Symptoms within an Island Fishing Village", Canad. M. A. J. 30 July 1960, vol. 83, pp. 197–204
- W. J. Russell Taylor, Edward Llewellyn-Thomas, George C. Walker, and Edward A. Sellers. "Effects of a Combination of Atropine, Metaraminol and Pyridine Aldoxime Methanesulfonate (AMP Therapy) on Normal Human Subjects", Can Med Assoc J. 1965 October 30; 93(18): 957–961.
- Walters, Richard H, Edward Llewellyn Thomas, and C. William Acker. "Enhancement of Punitive Behavior by Audio-Visual Displays", Science, 8 June 1962, 136: 872-873
- N. H. Mackworth and E. L. Thomas, "Head-mounted eye-marker camera," J. Opt. Soc. Am. 52, 713-716 (1962)
- Llewellyn-Thomas, Edward. "Preparation of Skin for Electrocardiography", British Medical Journal, Correspondence Section, 22 February 1958, p. 460

=== Science fiction ===
In each of Llewellyn's stories, except Fugitive in Transit, Earth enters into an apocalypse and struggles to recover. Word Bringer and Salvage and Destroy present an alien view of Earth and introduce the character who will bring about the end of civilization on earth.

- Llewellyn, Edward. The Lords of Creation, 1985 (short fiction)
- Llewellyn, Edward. Fugitive in Transit, DAW Books, 1985
- Llewellyn, Edward. Word-Bringer, DAW Books, 1986

==== The Douglas Convolution series ====
- Llewellyn, Edward. The Douglas Convolution, DAW Books, 1979
- Llewellyn, Edward. The Bright Companion, DAW Books, 1980
- Llewellyn, Edward. Prelude to Chaos, DAW Books, 1983
- Llewellyn, Edward. Salvage and Destroy, DAW Books, 1984
