= Llewelyn Williams =

Llewelyn Williams (or similar) may refer to:

- W. Llewelyn Williams (1867–1922), Welsh journalist, lawyer and Liberal politician
- Llywelyn Williams (1911–1965), Welsh Labour party politician
