= David Llewellyn (footballer) =

Welsh footballer

David Llewelyn
Personal information
- Full name: David John Llewelyn
- Date of birth: 9 August 1949 (age 77)
- Place of birth: Cardiff, Wales
- Position: Winger

Senior career*
Years	Team	Apps	(Gls)
1969–1972	West Ham United	6	(0)
1973–1975	Peterborough United	13	(3)
1974–1975	→ Mansfield Town (loan)	8	(0)
Total		27	(3)
- * Club domestic league appearances and goals

David John Llewelyn (born 9 August 1949) is a Welsh former professional footballer who played in the Football League for Mansfield Town, Peterborough United and West Ham United.
