= Llywelyn (name) =

Welsh name from the medieval age

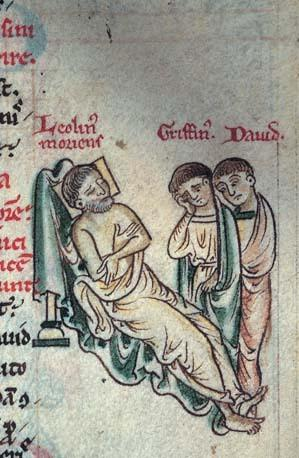
- Prince Llywelyn of Wales at his death in 1240, with his sons Gruffydd and Dafydd mourning. Llywelyn is spelt Leolinus above his head in the Latin manuscript.
- Pronunciation: Welsh: [ɬəˈwɛlɪn] English: /luˈɛlɪn/ loo-EL-in

Origin
- Origin: Common Brittonic
- Meaning: Evolved from Lugubelinos, a compound of two Common Brittonic names for Celtic gods: Lugus and Belenus.
- Region of origin: Wales

Other names
- Related names: numerous

Llywelyn (Welsh: [ɬəˈwɛlɪn], English: /luˈɛlɪn/) is a Welsh personal name, which has also become a family name most commonly spelt Llewellyn (/luˈɛlɪn/ loo-EL-in). The name has many variations and derivations, mainly as a result of the difficulty for non-Welsh speakers of representing the sound of the initial double ll (a voiceless alveolar lateral fricative).

The name Lewis became closely associated with Llywelyn as early as the 13th century, when Anglo-Norman scribes often used the former as an anglicised version of the latter; many Welsh families came to do the same over the following centuries as the adoption of formal English-style surnames became more widespread.

== Etymology ==
The name is traditionally thought to have evolved from the Common Brittonic name Lugubelinos, which was a compound of two names for Celtic deities. This, for example, was the view of the linguist Kenneth Jackson. In this interpretation, the first word of the compound, Lugus, is also the source of the first element in the names Llywarch and Lliwelydd, and, as an independent name, evolved into Welsh Lleu. The second word, Belenus, evolved as an independent name into Welsh Belyn.

However, in 2003 the scholar of Welsh names Meredith Cane interpreted the name as Welsh llyw ("leader") followed by two diminutive suffixes, -el- and -yn, an interpretation subsequently endorsed by the linguist Patrick Sims-Williams.

== History ==
Llywelyn the Great's arms became associated with the name for later generations. The arms are described as: Blazoned Quarterly or and gules, four lions passant guardant two and two counterchanged langued and armed Azure.

The name Llywelyn became popular following the successes of Llywelyn the Great (r. 1195–1240), but was largely absent among Welsh princes prior to him. Although Llywelyn was the most common form of the name in the medieval period, variant spellings started emerging even in the early Middle Ages, in particular Llewelyn and Llewellyn, spellings that gave rise to a folk belief that the name was connected with lions (the Welsh word for lion being llew). This belief was further reinforced by Llywelyn the Great's adoption of his father Iorwerth ab Owain's coat of arms, incorporating four lions. The association also produced another early variant of the name, Leoline (based on Latin leo), commonly used in Norman French and French manuscripts. In medieval Latin manuscripts, the form Lewelinus was used.

A number of other variants have arisen, however, including Elilevelin, Ffuellen, Ffuellin, Fflellen, Flawelling, Fleuellen, Flewellin, Flewellen, Flewelling, Flewellyn, Fluellen, Fluellin, Fluelling, Flwellin, Fowellen, Fuelling, Lawellins, Lawellen, Lewellen, Leoloni, Lewallen, Lewlin, Lewilin, Llallin, Lleulin, Lleulini, Llewen, Leuleijon, Llewelling, Llewellinge, Llewellen, Llewhellin, Llewhelyn, Llewillin, Lluellen, Luellen, Thewell, Thewelinus, Thellyn, Thelen, Thewelling, Thelwelin, Thlewelyn, and Swellin. Some of these spellings reflect attempts by English and Norman writers to represent the initial consonant:

The sound of ll (i.e. 'the unilateral hiss') was much more difficult [to represent in English or French spelling]: chl, thl, were sometimes used: fl, as in Fluellen, was also used; and these 'symbols' represent attempts to pronounce ll. In some texts no attempt is made to find a way of writing the ll sound and it is left as l.

— Morgan and Morgan (1985)

An alternative strategy was to substitute a similar-sounding name. Indeed, Anglo-Norman clerks followed a deliberate policy of substituting Anglo-Norman names for Welsh ones, and the name Lewis came to be used for Llywelyn as early as the 13th century, based on the apparent similarity of the first syllable to the first syllable of the name Louis (especially if the first syllable of Llywelyn was spelt Llew). The interchangeability of Llywelyn and Lewis could go both ways:

Long after the name Lewis, as a Christian name and as a surname, had been established in Wales, the awareness of an identity with Llywelyn remained, but only amongst the cultured and knowledgeable, like the Morrisses of Anglesey. Lewis Morris is often called Llewelyn Ddu or Llewellyn Ddu o Fôn; Williams tells his brother that his baby son's name is Lewis [... but later] he refers to the child as 'Llywelyn fach'. In ALMA 35 King Louis of France is called Llewelyn Ffreinig'

— Morgan and Morgan (1985)

Other examples include Lewis Glyn Cothi who was known as Llywelyn y Glyn, and Llywelyn ap Rhisiart whose bardic name was Lewys Morgannwg.

=== Derived forms ===
Three feminine forms have been derived from Llywelyn – Llywela, Llewellanne, Loella and Louella– as well as two hypocoristic forms, Llelo and Llela (usually considered male and female, respectively). The hypocoristic forms are always pronounced (and sometimes spelt) with an initial [l], rather than with the alveolar fricative represented in Welsh by ll.

As a given name, Llywelyn is often shortened to Llew or Lyn.

=== Associated surnames ===
Apart from variants mentioned above, surnames originating from Llywelyn include Apswellen, Bewellin, Bewlyn, Bewlen, Pawelin, Weallins, Wellings, Wellins, Welyn, Wellyns, Wellens, Wellence, Wellon, and Wellys. Surnames beginning Ap-, B-, or P are based on the Welsh patronymic naming system, where ap or ab ("son of") was used with the father's first name. As Welsh people came to adopt Anglo-Norman-style surnames, ap was either incorporated into the name as in Apswellen or Pawelin, dropped entirely as in (Lly)Welyn, or replaced with an -s at the end of the name as in Wellyns (see Welsh surnames). In some regions of England the surname Welling may derive from an English place-name, but in Welsh Marcher counties its frequency suggests that it can be traced back to (Lly)welyn. More common than any of these surnames is the surname Lewis (see above), with its related variants Lewes, Lewys, Lowys, Lowis, Llewys, Llewis, Llwys, Llewes. A Latinised variant, Leodovicus, re-entered English as Lodwick, Ludwick, Lotwick, and Lodowick, names that are especially common in South Wales.

As the name Lewis was in use before the abandonment of the patronomic system in Wales, Morgan and Morgan (1985) note that “it is difficult to understand why ap Lewis did not result in a surname Blewis."
