= FA Youth Cup Finals of the 1960s =

List of English football matches

FA Youth Cup Finals from 1960 to 1969.

== 1968–69: Sunderland v. West Bromwich Albion (6–3 aggregate) ==
Note: Flags indicate national team as defined under FIFA eligibility rules; some limited exceptions apply. Players may hold more than one non-FIFA nationality.

Sunderland
No.	Pos.	Nation	Player
1	GK	ENG	Trevor Swinburne
2	DF	ENG	Keith Coleman
3	DF	ENG	Bob Lunn
4	DF	ENG	Mick McGiven
5	DF	ENG	Richie Pitt
6	MF	ENG	John Tones
7	FW	ENG	Colin Beesley
8	MF	ENG	Paddy Lowrey
9	FW	ENG	John Lathan
10	MF	SCO	Bobby Park
11	FW	ENG	George McDermid
sub	MF	ENG	Fred McIver

West Bromwich Albion
No.	Pos.	Nation	Player
1	GK	ENG	Gordon Nisbet
2	DF	ENG	Roger Minton
3	DF	ENG	Syd Bell
4	DF	ENG	Lyndon Hughes
5	DF	SCO	Jim Holton
6	DF	SCO	Alistair Robertson
7	MF	ENG	Stuart Woolgar
8	MF	SCO	Asa Hartford
9	FW	ENG	Keith Morris
10	MF	ENG	Len Cantello
11	FW	SCO	Hugh Maclean
sub	FW	ENG	David Butler

== 1967–68: Burnley v. Coventry City (1–2 and 2–0, 3–2 aggregate) ==
Note: Flags indicate national team as defined under FIFA eligibility rules; some limited exceptions apply. Players may hold more than one non-FIFA nationality.

Burnley
No.	Pos.	Nation	Player
1	GK	ENG	Gerry McEvoy
2	DF	ENG	Peter Jones
3	DF	ENG	Mick Docherty (C.)
4	DF	ENG	Wilf Wrigley
5	DF	ENG	Eddie Cliff
6	MF	ENG	Eric Probert
7	MF	ENG	Alan West
8	FW	ENG	Dave Hartley
9	FW	SCO	Willie Brown
10	FW	ENG	Dave Thomas
11	FW	ENG	Steve Kindon
Sub	MF	ENG	George Coppock

Coventry City
No.	Pos.	Nation	Player
1	GK	ENG	Dick Deighton
2	DF	ENG	Ivan Crossley
3	DF	ENG	Brian Joy
4	DF	ENG	Don Peachey
5	DF	ENG	Jeff Blockley (C.)
6	MF	ENG	Bryan Wilks
7	MF	ENG	Tom Sinclair
8	FW	ENG	Bob Allen
9	FW	ENG	Trevor Gould
10	FW	ENG	Graham Paddon
11	FW	ENG	Peter Farmer
6	MF	ENG	Hill
11	FW	SCO	Billy Rafferty

== 1966–67: Sunderland v. Birmingham City (1–0 and 1–0, 2–0 aggregate) ==
=== First leg ===
St Andrews, 17 May 1967
Birmingham City - Sunderland 0–1 (0–1)
0–1 23 min. Billy Hughes (pen.)
Attendance: 9,877

=== Second leg ===
Roker Park, 22 May 1967
Sunderland - Birmingham City 1–0 (0–0)
1–0 85 min. Albert Brown
Attendance: 15,266

Note: Flags indicate national team as defined under FIFA eligibility rules; some limited exceptions apply. Players may hold more than one non-FIFA nationality.

Sunderland
No.	Pos.	Nation	Player
1	GK	ENG	Derek Forster
2	DF	ENG	Peter Robinson
3	DF	ENG	Eamon McLaughlan
4	DF	ENG	Brian Chambers
5	DF	ENG	Richard Huntley
6	MF	ENG	Keith Felton
7	MF	ENG	Bernard Fagan
8	MF	ENG	Colin Suggett (C)
9	FW	ENG	Malcolm Moore
10	FW	SCO	Albert Brown
11	FW	SCO	Billy Hughes
Sub	DF	ENG	Keith Coleman

Birmingham City
No.	Pos.	Nation	Player
1	GK	ENG	Dave Latchford
2	DF	ENG	Alan Reynolds
3	DF	ENG	David Beckett
4	DF	ENG	Stephen Lee
5	DF	WAL	John Saunders
6	MF	ENG	Garry Pendrey
7	MF	ENG	Trevor Rushworth
8	MF	ENG	Sidney Dorsett
9	FW	ENG	Bob Latchford
10	FW	ENG	Keith Bowker
11	MF	ENG	Trevor Jones
Sub	MF	ENG	Alan Childs

== 1965–66: Arsenal v. Sunderland (5–3 aggregate) ==
Note: Flags indicate national team as defined under FIFA eligibility rules; some limited exceptions apply. Players may hold more than one non-FIFA nationality.

Arsenal
No.	Pos.	Nation	Player
—	GK	ENG	Ernie Adams
—	DF	NIR	Pat Rice
—	DF	ENG	Tommy Youlden
—	DF	ENG	Micky Boot
—	DF	ENG	Ian Gillibrand
—	DF	SCO	John Woodward
—	MF	ENG	Trevor Rhodes
—	MF	ENG	Robert Bristow
—	MF	SCO	Neil Leven
—	MF	SCO	Andrew Milne
—	FW	SCO	Gordon Cumming
—	FW	ENG	Dave Simmons
—	FW	NIR	Sammy Nelson

Sunderland
No.	Pos.	Nation	Player
—	GK	ENG	Derek Forster
—	DF	ENG	Terry Adamson
—	DF	ENG	Eamon McLaughlan
—	DF	ENG	Colin Todd
—	DF	ENG	David Adams
—	MF	ENG	Keith Felton
—	MF	ENG	Bernard Fagan
—	MF	ENG	Colin Suggett
—	FW	ENG	Malcolm Moore
—	MF	SCO	Bobby Kerr
—	FW	SCO	Billy Hughes

== 1964–65: Everton v. Arsenal (3–2 aggregate) ==
Note: Flags indicate national team as defined under FIFA eligibility rules; some limited exceptions apply. Players may hold more than one non-FIFA nationality.

Everton
No.	Pos.	Nation	Player
1	GK	ENG	Geoff Barnett
2	DF	ENG	David Pearson
3	DF	ENG	Frank D'Arcy
4	DF	ENG	John Hurst
5	DF	ENG	Eric Curwen
6	MF	AUS	Dennis Yaager
7	MF	ENG	Alex Wallace
8	MF	ENG	Gerry Glover
9	FW	ENG	Tony McLaughlin
10	FW	ENG	Jimmy Husband
11	FW	ENG	Aiden Maher
12	MF	ENG	David Grant

Arsenal
No.	Pos.	Nation	Player
1	GK	ENG	Ernie Adams
2	DF	ENG	Roy Pack
3	DF	ENG	Billy Hinton
4	DF	ENG	Vince Adams
5	DF	ENG	Ernie Wilkinson
6	MF	ENG	David Jenkins
7	MF	SCO	Gordon Neilson
8	MF	SCO	Neil Leven
9	FW	ENG	Doug Baker

== 1963–64: Manchester United v. Swindon Town (1–1 and 4–1, 5–2 aggregate) ==
=== Second leg ===
Old Trafford, 30 April 1964
Manchester United - Swindon Town 4–1 (1–0)
1–0 44 min. David Sadler
2–0 46 min. David Sadler
2–1 68 min. Bruce Walker
3–1 70 min. David Sadler
4–1 87 min. John Aston
Attendance: 25,563

Note: Flags indicate national team as defined under FIFA eligibility rules; some limited exceptions apply. Players may hold more than one non-FIFA nationality.

Manchester United
No.	Pos.	Nation	Player
1	GK	ENG	Jimmy Rimmer
2	DF	ENG	Alan Duff
3	DF	ENG	Bobby Noble (C.)
4	MF	SCO	Peter McBride
5	MF	ENG	David Farrar
6	MF	SCO	John Fitzpatrick
7	FW	ENG	Willie Anderson
8	FW	NIR	George Best
9	FW	ENG	David Sadler
10	FW	ENG	Albert Kinsey
11	FW	ENG	John Aston
Manager		WAL	Jimmy Murphy

Swindon Town
No.	Pos.	Nation	Player
1	GK	ENG	Tony Hicks
2	DF	ENG	Brian Foscolo
3	DF	ENG	Terry Ling
4	MF	ENG	Bernard Griffin
5	MF	ENG	Roger Brown
6	MF	ENG	Dennis Prosser
7	FW	ENG	Don Rogers
8	FW	ENG	Dennis Peapell
9	FW	ENG	Dick Plumb
10	FW	ENG	Ricky Tabor
11	FW	ENG	Bruce Walker
Manager		ENG	Bert Head

=== First leg ===
County Ground, 27 April 1964
Swindon Town - Manchester United 1–1 (1–0)
1–0 31 min. Don Rogers
1–1 70 min. George Best
Attendance: 17,000

Note: Flags indicate national team as defined under FIFA eligibility rules; some limited exceptions apply. Players may hold more than one non-FIFA nationality.

Swindon Town
No.	Pos.	Nation	Player
1	GK	ENG	Tony Hicks
2	DF	ENG	Brian Foscolo
3	DF	ENG	Terry Ling
4	MF	ENG	Bernard Griffin
5	MF	ENG	Roger Brown
6	MF	ENG	Dennis Prosser
7	FW	ENG	Don Rogers
8	FW	ENG	Dennis Peapell
9	FW	ENG	Dick Plumb
10	FW	ENG	Ricky Tabor
11	FW	ENG	Bruce Walker
Manager		ENG	Bert Head

Manchester United
No.	Pos.	Nation	Player
1	GK	ENG	Jimmy Rimmer
2	DF	ENG	Alan Duff
3	DF	ENG	Bobby Noble (C.)
4	MF	SCO	Peter McBride
5	MF	ENG	David Farrar
6	MF	SCO	John Fitzpatrick
7	FW	ENG	Willie Anderson
8	FW	NIR	George Best
9	FW	ENG	David Sadler
10	FW	ENG	Albert Kinsey
11	FW	ENG	John Aston
Manager		WAL	Jimmy Murphy

== 1962–63: West Ham United v. Liverpool (1–3 and 5–2, 6–5 aggregate) ==
Note: Flags indicate national team as defined under FIFA eligibility rules; some limited exceptions apply. Players may hold more than one non-FIFA nationality.

West Ham
No.	Pos.	Nation	Player
1	GK	ENG	Colin Mackleworth
2	DF	ENG	Dennis Burnett
3	DF	ENG	Bill Kitchener
4	DF	ENG	Trevor Dawkins
5	DF	ENG	John Charles (C.)
6	MF	ENG	Bobby Howe
7	MF	ENG	Harry Redknapp
8	MF	ENG	Peter Bennett
9	FW	ENG	Martin Britt
10	FW	ENG	John Sissons
11	FW	ENG	John Dryden

Liverpool
No.	Pos.	Nation	Player
1	GK	ENG	Rodney Swindlehurst
2	DF	ENG	Tommy Lowry
3	DF	ENG	Alan Hignett
4	DF	ENG	Tommy Smith (C.)
5	DF	ENG	John Turner
6	MF	ENG	John Bennett
7	MF	ENG	Grant McCulloch
8	MF	SCO	George Scott
9	FW	SCO	Bobby Graham
10	FW	SCO	Phil Tinney
11	MF	ENG	Brian Halliday

== 1961–62: Newcastle United vs. Wolverhampton Wanderers (2–1 aggregate) ==
Note: Flags indicate national team as defined under FIFA eligibility rules; some limited exceptions apply. Players may hold more than one non-FIFA nationality.

Newcastle United
No.	Pos.	Nation	Player
1	GK	NIR	Stanley Craig
2	DF	NIR	David Craig
3	DF	ENG	Colin Clish
4	MF	ENG	Clive Chapman
5	DF	SCO	John Markie
6	DF	ENG	Dave Turner
7	FW	ENG	Matthew Gowland
8	FW	ENG	Alan Suddick
9	FW	ENG	George Watkin
10	FW	SCO	Bobby Moncur
11	FW	ENG	Les O'Neill

Wolverhampton Wanderers
No.	Pos.	Nation	Player
1	GK	ENG	Jim Barron
2	DF	ENG	Paddy Rickerby
3	DF	ENG	Bobby Thomson
4	MF	ENG	Fred Goodwin
5	DF	ENG	Dave Woodfield
6	MF	ENG	Ken Knighton
7	FW	ENG	Vic Povey
8	FW	ENG	Alan Attwood
9	FW	ENG	John Galley
10	FW	ENG	Peter Knowles
11	FW	ENG	Laurie Calloway

== 1960–61: Chelsea v. Everton (5–3 aggregate) ==
Note: Flags indicate national team as defined under FIFA eligibility rules; some limited exceptions apply. Players may hold more than one non-FIFA nationality.

Chelsea
No.	Pos.	Nation	Player
—	GK	ENG	John Cowan
—	DF	ENG	Dennis Butler
—	DF	ENG	Allan Harris
—	MF	ENG	Terry Venables
—	DF	ENG	Terry More
—	MF	ENG	Ron Harris
—	FW	ENG	Bert Murray
—	FW	ENG	Colin Shaw
—	FW	ENG	Gordon Bolland
—	FW	ENG	David Johnston
—	FW	ENG	David Gillingwater

Everton
No.	Pos.	Nation	Player
1	GK	SCO	Willie Mailey
2	DF	ENG	Roy Parnell
3	DF	ENG	Mick Gannon
4	MF	ENG	Alan Jarvis
5	DF	ENG	David Gorrie
6	MF	ENG	George Sharples
7	FW	ENG	Peter Maddocks
8	FW	ENG	Alan Tyrer
9	FW	WAL	Keith Webber
10	FW	ENG	George Morton
11	FW	ENG	Stan Edwards

== 1959–60: Chelsea v. Preston North End (1–1 and 4–1, 5–2 aggregate) ==
Note: Flags indicate national team as defined under FIFA eligibility rules; some limited exceptions apply. Players may hold more than one non-FIFA nationality.

Chelsea
No.	Pos.	Nation	Player
1	GK	ENG	Peter Bonetti
2	DF	ENG	Dennis Butler
3	DF	ENG	Allan Harris
4	MF	ENG	Terry Venables
5	DF	ENG	Terry More
6	MF	ENG	Ray Corney
7	FW	ENG	Bert Murray
8	FW	ENG	Colin Shaw
9	FW	ENG	Gordon Bolland
10	FW	ENG	Bobby Tambling
11	FW	ENG	M Robinson

Preston North End
No.	Pos.	Nation	Player
1	GK	ENG	John Barton
2	DF	SCO	George Ross
3	DF	ENG	Rodney Webb
4	MF	ENG	Gerry Baldwin
5	DF	SCO	David Will
6	MF	ENG	John Hart
7	FW	ENG	Michael Smith
8	MF	ENG	Dave Wilson
9	FW	ENG	Peter Thompson
10	MF	ENG	Alan Spavin
11	FW	ENG	Ian Matthews
Manager		ENG	George Bargh
