= 1973–74 Hereford United F.C. season =

Hereford United
1973–74 season
- Chairman: Frank Miles
- Manager: Colin Addison
- Stadium: Edgar Street
- Division Three: 18th
- League Cup: First round
- FA Cup: Fourth round
- Welsh Cup: Fourth round
- Top goalscorer: League: Brian Evans (8); All: Brian Evans and Jim Hinch (9)
- Highest home attendance: 17,431 v Bristol City, FA Cup, 26 January 1974
- Lowest home attendance: 3,810 v Plymouth Argyle, Division Three, 20 February 1974
- Average home league attendance: 8,040
- Biggest win: 3–0 v Brighton & Hove Albion (H), Division Three, 27 October 1973; 3–0 v Walton & Hersham (H), FA Cup, 15 December 1973; 3–0 v Southport (H), Division Three, 30 March 1974
- Biggest defeat: 0–5 v Wrexham (A), Division Three, 22 December 1973

The 1973–74 season was the 45th season of competitive football played by Hereford United Football Club and their second in the Football League. Following promotion in their debut league season, the club competed in Division Three, as well as the League Cup, FA Cup and Welsh Cup.

== Summary ==
Hereford enjoyed a steady start to the season and were as high as fifth in the table by the end of October. A sequence of only five wins between the beginning of November and the end of March checked their progress, but a nine-match unbeaten run pulled them clear of danger to an eventual 18th-place finish, eight points above the relegation zone.

In the FA Cup, Hereford evoked memories of previous giant-killing exploits with a 2–1 replay win over West Ham United in the third round. Alan Jones struck the winning goal after a late Pat Holland equaliser had denied Hereford victory in the first match at Upton Park. The Cup run ended in the next round at the hands of Bristol City.

On 26 September 1973, Brian Evans, a pre-season signing from Swansea City, became the first Hereford player to win an international cap when he featured in Wales' 3–0 defeat against Poland in a World Cup qualifier.

== Squad ==
Players who made one appearance or more for Hereford United F.C. during the 1973-74 season

| Pos. | Nat. | Name | League | | League Cup | | FA Cup | | Welsh Cup | | Total | |
| Pos. | Nat. | Name | Apps | Goals | Apps | Goals | Apps | Goals | Apps | Goals | Apps | Goals |
|---|---|---|---|---|---|---|---|---|---|---|---|---|
| GK | ENG | Peta Bala'c (on loan from Plymouth Argyle) | 2 | 0 | 0 | 0 | 0 | 0 | 1 | 0 | 3 | 0 |
| GK | SCO | Tommy Hughes | 43 | 0 | 1 | 0 | 5 | 0 | 0 | 0 | 49 | 0 |
| GK | ENG | Fred Potter | 1 | 0 | 0 | 0 | 0 | 0 | 0 | 0 | 1 | 0 |
| DF | SCO | Gary Bell (on loan from Cardiff City) | 8 | 0 | 0 | 0 | 0 | 0 | 0 | 0 | 8 | 0 |
| DF | ENG | David Carver | 14 | 0 | 1 | 0 | 0 | 0 | 1 | 0 | 16 | 0 |
| DF | ENG | Steve Emery | 7 | 0 | 0 | 0 | 0 | 0 | 0 | 0 | 7 | 0 |
| DF | WAL | Alan Jones | 24(1) | 1 | 0 | 0 | 4 | 2 | 1 | 0 | 29(1) | 3 |
| DF | WAL | Mick McLaughlin | 43 | 0 | 1 | 0 | 5 | 0 | 0 | 0 | 49 | 0 |
| DF | ENG | Ken Mallender | 26(1) | 1 | 0 | 0 | 0 | 0 | 1 | 0 | 27(1) | 1 |
| DF | ENG | Tommy Naylor | 36 | 4 | 1 | 0 | 5 | 1 | 1 | 0 | 43 | 5 |
| DF | ENG | Billy Tucker | 36 | 1 | 1 | 0 | 1 | 0 | 0 | 0 | 38 | 1 |
| MF | ENG | Colin Addison | 7 | 0 | 0 | 0 | 2 | 0 | 0 | 0 | 9 | 0 |
| MF | WAL | Brian Evans | 30(1) | 8 | 1 | 0 | 5 | 1 | 0 | 0 | 36(1) | 9 |
| MF | ENG | Alan Gane | 6(3) | 1 | 0 | 0 | 0 | 0 | 0 | 0 | 6(3) | 1 |
| MF | ENG | Harry Gregory | 21 | 2 | 0 | 0 | 2 | 0 | 0 | 0 | 23 | 2 |
| MF | ENG | Ron Radford | 33 | 3 | 1 | 0 | 5 | 0 | 0 | 0 | 39 | 3 |
| MF | ENG | David Rudge | 27(4) | 3 | 1 | 0 | 4 | 0 | 1 | 0 | 33(4) | 3 |
| MF | ENG | Colin Tavener | 22 | 2 | 1 | 0 | 3 | 0 | 1 | 0 | 27 | 2 |
| MF | ENG | Paul Taylor (on loan from York City) | 0(1) | 0 | 0 | 0 | 0 | 0 | 1 | 0 | 1(1) | 0 |
| MF | ENG | Dudley Tyler | 21 | 2 | 0 | 0 | 4 | 1 | 1 | 0 | 26 | 3 |
| FW | SCO | Willie Brown (on loan from Newport County) | 9 | 5 | 0 | 0 | 0 | 0 | 0 | 0 | 9 | 5 |
| FW | ENG | Jim Hinch | 22(5) | 7 | 0 | 0 | 5 | 2 | 1 | 0 | 28(5) | 9 |
| FW | ENG | David Jenkins | 10(2) | 0 | 1 | 0 | 0(1) | 0 | 1 | 1 | 12(3) | 1 |
| FW | ENG | Paul Lee | 12(4) | 2 | 0 | 0 | 0 | 0 | 0 | 0 | 12(4) | 2 |
| FW | ENG | Brian Owen | 15(6) | 2 | 0(1) | 0 | 2(2) | 1 | 0 | 0 | 17(9) | 3 |
| FW | ENG | Eric Redrobe | 21(4) | 5 | 1 | 0 | 3(1) | 1 | 0 | 0 | 25(5) | 6 |
| FW | ENG | John Ritchie | 10(1) | 3 | 0 | 0 | 0 | 0 | 0 | 0 | 10(1) | 3 |

== League table ==
| Pos | Team | Pld | W | D | L | GF | GA | GAv | Pts |
|---|---|---|---|---|---|---|---|---|---|
| 16 | Tranmere Rovers | 46 | 15 | 15 | 16 | 50 | 44 | 1.136 | 45 |
| 17 | Plymouth Argyle | 46 | 17 | 10 | 19 | 59 | 54 | 1.093 | 44 |
| 18 | Hereford United | 46 | 14 | 15 | 17 | 53 | 57 | 0.930 | 43 |
| 19 | Brighton & Hove Albion | 46 | 16 | 11 | 19 | 52 | 58 | 0.897 | 43 |
| 20 | Port Vale | 46 | 14 | 14 | 18 | 52 | 58 | 0.897 | 42 |

Source: rsssf.com

== Results ==
=== Third Division ===
| 25 August 1973 1 | Grimsby Town | 1–3 | Hereford United | Cleethorpes |
| | Chatterley 88' | | Tavener 73'; Tucker 77'; Evans 90' | Stadium: Blundell Park; Attendance: 10,709 |

| 1 September 1973 2 | Hereford United | 1–0 | Blackburn Rovers | Hereford |
| | Gregory 68' | | | Stadium: Edgar Street; Attendance: 9,483 |

| 8 September 1973 3 | Charlton Athletic | 2–0 | Hereford United | London |
| | Horsfield 60', 73' | | | Stadium: The Valley; Attendance: 5,640 |

| 11 September 1973 4 | Bristol Rovers | 1–1 | Hereford United | Bristol |
| | Taylor 90' | | Redrobe 7' | Stadium: Eastville; Attendance: 12,620 |

| 15 September 1973 5 | Hereford United | 1–1 | Watford | Hereford |
| | Evans 26' | | Lees 50' | Stadium: Edgar Street; Attendance: 8,634 |

| 19 September 1973 6 | Hereford United | 0–2 | Tranmere Rovers | Hereford |
| | | | Young 52'; Loyden 90' | Stadium: Edgar Street; Attendance: 9,004 |

| 22 September 1973 7 | Halifax Town | 1–1 | Hereford United | Halifax |
| | Gwyther 84' | | Mallender 7' | Stadium: The Shay; Attendance: 12,620 |

| 29 September 1973 8 | Hereford United | 2–0 | Wrexham | Hereford |
| | Radford 39'; Redrobe 89' | | | Stadium: Edgar Street; Attendance: 8,245 |

| 6 October 1973 9 | Port Vale | 1–3 | Hereford United | Stoke-on-Trent |
| | Woodward 58' | | Owen 56'; Evans 71'; Redrobe 85' | Stadium: Vale Park; Attendance: 5,802 |

| 8 October 1973 10 | Tranmere Rovers | 0–0 | Hereford United | Birkenhead |
| | | | | Stadium: Prenton Park; Attendance: 5,943 |

| 13 October 1973 11 | Hereford United | 0–0 | Cambridge United | Hereford |
| | | | | Stadium: Edgar Street; Attendance: 8,522 |

| 19 October 1973 12 | Southend United | 2–1 | Hereford United | Southend-on-Sea |
| | Albeson 45' (pen.); Brace 83' | | Gregory 68' | Stadium: Roots Hall; Attendance: 6,083 |

| 24 October 1973 13 | Hereford United | 0–0 | Bristol Rovers | Hereford |
| | | | | Stadium: Edgar Street; Attendance: 12,501 |

| 27 October 1973 14 | Hereford United | 3–0 | Brighton & Hove Albion | Hereford |
| | Lee 27'; Evans 44'; Gane 90' | | | Stadium: Edgar Street; Attendance: 8,139 |

| 2 November 1973 15 | Southport | 1–1 | Hereford United | Southport |
| | Moore 83' | | Hinch 65' | Stadium: Haig Avenue; Attendance: 2,549 |

| 10 November 1973 16 | Hereford United | 3–4 | Oldham Athletic | Hereford |
| | Hinch 20', 65'; Lee 35' | | Jones 11', 14'; Blair 19'; Lochhead 21' | Stadium: Edgar Street; Attendance: 8,843 |

| 12 November 1973 17 | York City | 0–0 | Hereford United | York |
| | | | | Stadium: Bootham Crescent; Attendance: 7,433 |

| 17 November 1973 18 | Hereford United | 0–1 | Huddersfield Town | Hereford |
| | | | Gowling 30' | Stadium: Edgar Street; Attendance: 7,925 |

| 1 December 1973 19 | Hereford United | 3–1 | Walsall | Hereford |
| | Tyler 36'; Hinch 43'; Evans 71' | | Andrews 81' | Stadium: Edgar Street; Attendance: 7,747 |

| 8 December 1973 20 | Chesterfield | 1–1 | Hereford United | Chesterfield |
| | Phelan 67' | | Tiler 77' (o.g.) | Stadium: Saltergate; Attendance: 4,343 |

| 22 December 1973 21 | Wrexham | 5–0 | Hereford United | Wrexham |
| | Griffiths 4', 64' (pen.), 82'; Whittle 85', 90' | | | Stadium: Racecourse Ground; Attendance: 5,156 |

| 26 December 1973 22 | Hereford United | 0–2 | Bournemouth | Hereford |
| | | | Sainty 11'; Boyer 90' | Stadium: Edgar Street; Attendance: 10,909 |

| 29 December 1973 23 | Hereford United | 2–3 | Charlton Athletic | Hereford |
| | Naylor 50' (pen.); Jones 85' | | Jones 3' (o.g.); Flanagan 28'; Horsfield 56' | Stadium: Edgar Street; Attendance: 7,752 |

| 1 January 1974 24 | Blackburn Rovers | 1–2 | Hereford United | Blackburn |
| | Hutchins 67' | | Tavener 3'; Rudge 87' | Stadium: Ewood Park; Attendance: 9,720 |

| 12 January 1974 25 | Watford | 2–1 | Hereford United | Watford |
| | Jennings 61', 65' | | Evans 7' | Stadium: Vicarage Road; Attendance: 7,548 |

| 19 January 1974 26 | Hereford United | 2–1 | Grimsby Town | Hereford |
| | Naylor 22' (pen.); Evans 25' | | Booth 24' | Stadium: Edgar Street; Attendance: 10,287 |

| 3 February 1974 27 | Aldershot | 1–0 | Hereford United | Aldershot |
| | Howarth 22' | | | Stadium: Recreation Ground; Attendance: 9,109 |

| 17 February 1974 28 | Cambridge United | 2–0 | Hereford United | Cambridge |
| | Lennard 25'; Ferguson 80' | | | Stadium: Abbey Stadium; Attendance: 5,728 |

| 20 February 1974 29 | Hereford United | 0–1 | Plymouth Argyle | Hereford |
| | | | Reed 46' | Stadium: Edgar Street; Attendance: 3,810 |

| 23 February 1974 30 | Hereford United | 2–1 | Port Vale | Hereford |
| | Owen 37'; Radford 47' | | Woodward 4' | Stadium: Edgar Street; Attendance: 6,566 |

| 26 February 1974 31 | Rochdale | 1–1 | Hereford United | Rochdale |
| | Brennan 79' | | Rudge 39' | Stadium: Spotland; Attendance: 1,195 |

| 2 March 1974 32 | Bournemouth | 3–2 | Hereford United | Bournemouth |
| | Sainty 29' (pen.); Chadwick 67'; Greenhalgh 72' | | Radford 65'; Naylor 80' (pen.) | Stadium: Dean Court; Attendance: 8,370 |

| 10 March 1974 33 | Brighton & Hove Albion | 2–1 | Hereford United | Hove |
| | Beamish 64'; Piper 88' | | Tyler 6' | Stadium: Goldstone Ground; Attendance: 17,061 |

| 13 March 1974 34 | Hereford United | 3–1 | Halifax Town | Hereford |
| | Brown 17', 73'; Redrobe 79' | | Wilkie 87' | Stadium: Edgar Street; Attendance: 6,170 |

| 16 March 1974 35 | Hereford United | 1–2 | Southend United | Hereford |
| | Rudge 6' | | Moody 7'; Silvester 90' | Stadium: Edgar Street; Attendance: 7,138 |

| 20 March 1974 36 | Hereford United | 0–2 | Aldershot | Hereford |
| | | | Howarth 57', 59' | Stadium: Edgar Street; Attendance: 6,424 |

| 23 March 1974 37 | Oldham Athletic | 1–1 | Hereford United | Oldham |
| | Lochhead 43' | | Ritchie 17' | Stadium: Boundary Park; Attendance: 11,379 |

| 26 March 1974 38 | Plymouth Argyle | 0–1 | Hereford United | Plymouth |
| | | | Brown 58' | Stadium: Home Park; Attendance: 7,516 |

| 30 March 1974 39 | Hereford United | 3–0 | Southport | Hereford |
| | Hinch 31'; Brown 40', 62' | | | Stadium: Edgar Street; Attendance: 6,186 |

| 3 April 1974 40 | Hereford United | 2–1 | Rochdale | Hereford |
| | Ritchie 48'; Hinch 51' | | Hanvey 65' | Stadium: Edgar Street; Attendance: 6,659 |

| 6 April 1974 41 | Hereford United | 0–0 | York City | Hereford |
| | | | | Stadium: Edgar Street; Attendance: 7,866 |

| 13 April 1974 42 | Huddersfield Town | 0–0 | Hereford United | Huddersfield |
| | | | | Stadium: Leeds Road; Attendance: 4,148 |

| 15 April 1974 43 | Hereford United | 1–1 | Shrewsbury Town | Hereford |
| | Ritchie 33' | | Moir 74' | Stadium: Edgar Street; Attendance: 9,005 |

| 16 April 1974 44 | Shrewsbury Town | 1–1 | Hereford United | Shrewsbury |
| | Marlowe 48' | | Evans 90' | Stadium: Gay Meadow; Attendance: 5,580 |

| 20 April 1974 45 | Hereford United | 2–1 | Chesterfield | Hereford |
| | Naylor 65' (pen.); Redrobe 76' | | Kabia 10' | Stadium: Edgar Street; Attendance: 7,109 |

| 27 April 1974 46 | Walsall | 3–1 | Hereford United | Walsall |
| | Buckley 27'; Taylor 28', 37' | | Hinch 58' | Stadium: Fellows Park; Attendance: 4,167 |

=== League Cup ===
| 29 August 1973 First round | Cardiff City | 2–0 | Hereford United | Cardiff |
| | McCulloch 41', 60' | | | Stadium: Ninian Park; Attendance: 9,821 |

=== FA Cup ===
| 24 November 1973 First round | Hereford United | 3–1 | Torquay United | Hereford |
| | Evans 42'; Hinch 66'; Owen 74' | | Morrall 34' | Stadium: Edgar Street; Attendance: 8,331 |

| 15 December 1973 Second round | Hereford United | 3–0 | Walton & Hersham | Hereford |
| | Hinch 21'; Tyler 57'; Jones 61' | | | Stadium: Edgar Street; Attendance: 10,431 |

| 5 January 1974 Third round | West Ham United | 1–1 | Hereford United | London |
| | Holland 88' | | Redrobe 21' | Stadium: Upton Park; Attendance: 23,087 |

| 9 January 1974 Third round replay | Hereford United | 2–1 | West Ham United | Hereford |
| | Naylor 35' (pen.); Jones 74' | | Best 33' | Stadium: Edgar Street; Attendance: 17,423 |

| 26 January 1974 Fourth round | Hereford United | 0–1 | Bristol City | Hereford |
| | | | Merrick 17' | Stadium: Edgar Street; Attendance: 17,431 |

=== Welsh Cup ===
| 16 January 1974 Fourth round | Worcester City | 2–1 | Hereford United | Worcester |
| | Aggio 23'; Ross 24' | | Jenkins 21' | Stadium: St George's Lane; Attendance: 715 |
