= 1972–73 Hereford United F.C. season =

Hereford United
1972–73 season
- Chairman: Frank Miles
- Manager: Colin Addison
- Stadium: Edgar Street
- Division Four: 2nd
- League Cup: First round
- FA Cup: First round
- Welsh Cup: Semi-final
- Top goalscorer: League: Brian Owen (11); All: Brian Owen (13)
- Highest home attendance: 14,849 v Newport County, Division Four, 7 April 1973
- Lowest home attendance: 4,100 v Pembroke Borough, Welsh Cup, 3 January 1973
- Average home league attendance: 8,917
- Biggest win: 6–1 v Pembroke Borough (H), Welsh Cup, 3 January 1973
- Biggest defeat: 1–4 v Aston Villa (A), League Cup, 16 August 1972; 1–4 v Lincoln City (A), Division Four, 9 September 1972

The 1972–73 season was the 44th season of competitive football played by Hereford United Football Club and their first in the Football League following election from non-league at the end of the previous season. The club competed in Division Four, as well as the League Cup, FA Cup and Welsh Cup.

== Background ==
Hereford ended the 1971–72 Southern League season as runners-up, two points behind champions Chelmsford City. They also reached the final of the Southern League Cup and enjoyed a run to the fourth round of the FA Cup which included a famous win over Newcastle United that put the club in the national spotlight. Hereford applied for election to the Football League and were duly voted in at the expense of Barrow.

== Summary ==
Hereford made their league bow in a 1–0 defeat away to Colchester United. The following weekend, Kenny Wallace scored their first league goal in a 3–0 home win over Reading, although the honour of Hereford's first scorer in a competitive match as a league club went to George Johnston in a midweek League Cup defeat to Aston Villa.

After 14 matches, Hereford had notched up only one further win and lay 21st in the division, but they doubled their tally in the next two matches by beating Northampton Town and leaders Mansfield Town. This started a 14 match unbeaten run that saw Hereford surge up the table to become promotion contenders. They maintained this good form, losing only three of their last 17 matches, but still needed at least a point from their final match against Crewe Alexandra to guarantee promotion. In the event, Hereford managed a 1–0 win courtesy of a goal by David Jenkins.

Hereford's average home crowd of nearly 9,000 was the highest in the Fourth Division (Reading's 5,521 being the next highest) and higher than all bar six clubs from the Third Division. They lost only once at Edgar Street and dropped just a single point from their last 17 home matches.

This was the only season at the club for goalkeeper David Icke. Despite suffering from rheumatoid arthritis which would force him to quit the game at the age of 21, Icke kept 18 clean sheets in 37 league appearances and did not once feature on the losing side at home.

== Squad ==
Players who made one appearance or more for Hereford United F.C. during the 1972-73 season

Pos.	Nat.	Name	League		League Cup		FA Cup		Welsh Cup		Total	
Pos.	Nat.	Name	Apps	Goals	Apps	Goals	Apps	Goals	Apps	Goals	Apps	Goals
GK	ENG	David Icke	37	0	0	0	1	0	4	0	42	0
GK	ENG	Fred Potter	9	0	1	0	0	0	0	0	10	0
DF	ENG	Steve Emery	0	0	0	0	0	0	0(1)	0	0(1)	0
DF	ENG	Roger Griffiths	7(2)	0	0	0	0	0	1	0	8(2)	0
DF	WAL	Alan Jones	28	1	1	0	1	0	1	0	31	1
DF	WAL	Mick McLaughlin	32	1	1	0	0	0	3	0	36	1
DF	ENG	Ken Mallender	45	0	1	0	1	0	4	0	51	0
DF	ENG	Tommy Naylor	35(2)	0	1	0	1	0	3	0	40(2)	0
DF	ENG	Billy Tucker	42	8	1	0	1	0	4	1	48	9
MF	ENG	Colin Addison	16	1	0	0	0	0	0	0	16	1
MF	ENG	Harry Gregory	39	3	0	0	0	0	2	0	41	3
MF	ENG	Ron Radford	28	3	1	0	1	0	2	0	32	3
MF	ENG	David Rudge	31(2)	3	0	0	0(1)	0	3	1	34(3)	4
MF	WAL	Clive Slattery	3(5)	0	1	0	1	0	2(1)	1	7(6)	1
MF	ENG	Colin Tavener	28(1)	1	0	0	1	0	4	1	33(1)	2
FW	ENG	Colin Hall (on loan from Bristol City)	5	0	0	0	0	0	0	0	5	0
FW	ENG	Ivan Hollett	11	2	1	0	0	0	0	0	12	2
FW	ENG	David Jenkins (on loan from Brentford)	8(2)	3	0	0	0	0	0	0	8(2)	3
FW	SCO	George Johnston	15(3)	5	0(1)	1	0	0	2	2	17(4)	8
FW	ENG	David Layne (on loan from Sheffield Wednesday)	4	0	0	0	0	0	0	0	4	0
FW	ENG	Brian Owen	31(5)	11	1	0	1	0	4	2	37(5)	13
FW	ENG	Eric Redrobe	26	9	0	0	1	0	2	0	29	9
FW	ENG	Kenny Wallace	26(6)	4	1	0	1	0	3	1	31(6)	5

== League table ==
Pos	Team	Pld	W	D	L	GF	GA	GAv	Pts	Promotion or relegation
1	Southport (C, P)	46	26	10	10	71	48	1.479	62	Promotion to the Third Division
2	Hereford United (P)	46	23	12	11	56	38	1.474	58	Promotion to the Third Division
3	Cambridge United (P)	46	20	17	9	67	57	1.175	57	Promotion to the Third Division
4	Aldershot (P)	46	22	12	12	60	38	1.579	56	Promotion to the Third Division
5	Newport County	46	22	12	12	64	44	1.455	56	

Source: rsssf.com
(C) Champions; (P) Promoted

== Results ==
=== Fourth Division ===
12 August 1972 1	Colchester United	1–0	Hereford United	Colchester
	Foley 47'			Stadium: Layer Road; Attendance: 6,083

19 August 1972 2	Hereford United	3–0	Reading	Hereford
	Wallace 27'; Addison 61'; Hollett 86'			Stadium: Edgar Street; Attendance: 8,839

26 August 1972 3	Bradford City	1–1	Hereford United	Bradford
	Gilliver 35'		Johnston 60'	Stadium: Valley Parade; Attendance: 3,969

30 August 1972 4	Crewe Alexandra	2–1	Hereford United	Crewe
	Humphreys 48', 58' (pen.)		Hollett 8'	Stadium: Gresty Road; Attendance: 3,820

2 September 1972 5	Hereford United	0–0	Workington	Hereford
				Stadium: Edgar Street; Attendance: 7,581

9 September 1972 6	Lincoln City	4–1	Hereford United	Lincoln
	Bradley 26', 46'; McNeil 50', 65'		Johnston 47'	Stadium: Sincil Bank; Attendance: 4,971

16 September 1972 7	Hereford United	0–0	Gillingham	Hereford
				Stadium: Edgar Street; Attendance: 6,796

19 September 1972 8	Hereford United	1–2	Barnsley	Hereford
	Johnston 15' (pen.)		Lea 2', 56'	Stadium: Edgar Street; Attendance: 6,857

22 September 1972 9	Southport	2–0	Hereford United	Southport
	Lee 13'; McPhee 32'			Stadium: Haig Avenue; Attendance: 3,311

26 September 1972 10	Doncaster Rovers	0–0	Hereford United	Doncaster
				Stadium: Belle Vue; Attendance: 3,111

30 September 1972 11	Hereford United	2–1	Torquay United	Hereford
	Johnston 57', 90'		Arnold 55'	Stadium: Edgar Street; Attendance: 7,009

7 October 1972 12	Hereford United	0–0	Hartlepool	Hereford
				Stadium: Edgar Street; Attendance: 7,521

11 October 1972 13	Cambridge United	1–0	Hereford United	Cambridge
	Phillips 4'			Stadium: Abbey Stadium; Attendance: 4,312

14 October 1972 14	Exeter City	1–0	Hereford United	Exeter
	Banks 8'			Stadium: St James Park; Attendance: 4,516

21 October 1972 15	Hereford United	2–0	Northampton Town	Hereford
	Radford 12'; Wallace 70'			Stadium: Edgar Street; Attendance: 7,202

25 October 1972 16	Hereford United	3–1	Mansfield Town	Hereford
	Wallace 11'; Redrobe 75'; Owen 85'		Wignall 34'	Stadium: Edgar Street; Attendance: 10,095

28 October 1972 17	Peterborough United	1–1	Hereford United	Peterborough
	Smith 20'		Owen 77'	Stadium: London Road; Attendance: 6,196

4 November 1972 18	Hereford United	3–2	Doncaster Rovers	Hereford
	Redrobe 35'; Owen 37'; Haselden 64' (o.g.)		Haselden 51', 89'	Stadium: Edgar Street; Attendance: 8,223

11 November 1972 19	Barnsley	0–0	Hereford United	Barnsley
				Stadium: Oakwell; Attendance: 2,823

25 November 1972 20	Hereford United	1–0	Aldershot	Hereford
	Rudge 34'			Stadium: Edgar Street; Attendance: 6,667

28 November 1972 21	Newport County	0–1	Hereford United	Newport
			Redrobe 52' (pen.)	Stadium: Somerton Park; Attendance: 8,772

9 December 1972 22	Hereford United	1–0	Bury	Hereford
	Jones 8'			Stadium: Edgar Street; Attendance: 6,566

22 December 1972 23	Stockport County	1–1	Hereford United	Stockport
	Griffiths 69'		Rudge 66'	Stadium: Edgeley Park; Attendance: 8,772

26 December 1972 24	Hereford United	2–2	Southport	Hereford
	Owen 16'; Tucker 90'		Fryatt 52'; Lloyd 62'	Stadium: Edgar Street; Attendance: 10,491

30 December 1972 25	Reading	0–1	Hereford United	Reading
			Owen 44'	Stadium: Elm Park; Attendance: 5,207

6 January 1973 26	Hereford United	1–0	Bradford City	Hereford
	Wallace 82'			Stadium: Edgar Street; Attendance: 8,193

13 January 1973 27	Mansfield Town	1–1	Hereford United	Mansfield
	Ellis 48'		Gregory 67'	Stadium: Field Mill; Attendance: 5,530

17 January 1973 28	Hereford United	3–1	Chester	Hereford
	Rudge 10'; Redrobe 24', 29'		Clapham 80'	Stadium: Edgar Street; Attendance: 8,795

20 January 1973 29	Workington	2–1	Hereford United	Workington
	Irving 39'; Helliwell 87'		Owen 68'	Stadium: Borough Park; Attendance: 2,065

27 January 1973 30	Hereford United	2–1	Lincoln City	Hereford
	Tavener 45'; Tucker 57'		Tavener 69' (o.g.)	Stadium: Edgar Street; Attendance: 8,639

3 February 1973 31	Hereford United	2–1	Cambridge United	Hereford
	Redrobe 27'; Tucker 57'		Greenhalgh 90'	Stadium: Edgar Street; Attendance: 8,907

10 February 1973 32	Gillingham	2–0	Hereford United	Gillingham
	Richardson 18'; Peach 62' (pen.)			Stadium: Priestfield; Attendance: 6,115

17 February 1973 33	Hereford United	4–1	Colchester United	Hereford
	Tucker 2', 65'; Gregory 40'; Redrobe 80'		Svarc 75'	Stadium: Edgar Street; Attendance: 7,624

24 February 1973 34	Chester	0–1	Hereford United	Chester
			Gregory 36'	Stadium: Sealand Road; Attendance: 4,264

3 March 1973 35	Hartlepool	0–1	Hereford United	Hartlepool
			McLaughlin 33'	Stadium: Victoria Ground; Attendance: 5,253

5 March 1973 36	Darlington	2–2	Hereford United	Darlington
	Sinclair 45', 75'		Owen 12', 38'	Stadium: Feethams; Attendance: 2,074

10 March 1973 37	Hereford United	1–0	Exeter City	Hereford
	Redrobe 84'			Stadium: Edgar Street; Attendance: 11,302

12 March 1973 38	Hereford United	1–0	Darlington	Hereford
	Tucker 60'			Stadium: Edgar Street; Attendance: 10,150

17 March 1973 39	Northampton Town	0–4	Hereford United	Northampton
			Redrobe 22'; Tucker 44'; Radford 47'; Owen 83'	Stadium: County Ground; Attendance: 4,479

24 March 1973 40	Hereford United	3–0	Peterborough United	Hereford
	Jenkins 41'; Owen 60'; Radford 74'			Stadium: Edgar Street; Attendance: 9,515

31 March 1973 41	Aldershot	2–0	Hereford United	Aldershot
	Melledew 29'; Howarth 32'			Stadium: Recreation Ground; Attendance: 7,060

7 April 1973 42	Hereford United	2–0	Newport County	Hereford
	Owen 56'; Jenkins 61'			Stadium: Edgar Street; Attendance: 14,849

14 April 1973 43	Bury	3–0	Hereford United	Bury
	Spence 12', 18'; Tinsley 65'			Stadium: Gigg Lane; Attendance: 4,319

18 April 1973 44	Hereford United	1–0	Stockport County	Hereford
	Tucker 90'			Stadium: Edgar Street; Attendance: 10,612

24 April 1973 45	Torquay United	0–0	Hereford United	Torquay
				Stadium: Plainmoor; Attendance: 5,079

28 April 1973 46	Hereford United	1–0	Crewe Alexandra	Hereford
	Jenkins 47'			Stadium: Edgar Street; Attendance: 12,616

=== League Cup ===
16 August 1972 First round	Aston Villa	4–1	Hereford United	Birmingham
	B. Rioch 24'; Graydon 46'; Vowden 71'; Evans 87'		Johnston 82'	Stadium: Villa Park; Attendance: 32,314

=== FA Cup ===
18 November 1972 First round	Torquay United	3–0	Hereford United	Torquay
	Stocks 12'; Harrison 62'; Twitchin 85'			Stadium: Plainmoor; Attendance: 4,851

=== Welsh Cup ===
3 January 1973 Fourth round	Hereford United	6–1	Pembroke Borough	Hereford
	Owen 15', 33'; Tavener 30'; Rudge 43'; Tucker 55'; Slattery 66'		Todd 18'	Stadium: Edgar Street; Attendance: 4,100

7 February 1973 Fifth round	Hereford United	0–0	Merthyr Tydfil	Hereford
				Stadium: Edgar Street; Attendance: 8,462

14 February 1973 Fifth round replay	Hereford United	3–0	Merthyr Tydfil	Hereford
	Johnston 43', 62' (pen.); Wallace 82'			Stadium: Edgar Street; Attendance: 5,198
Note: Played at Edgar Street after Merthyr chose to waive home rights

27 February 1973 Semi-final	Bangor City	2–0	Hereford United	Bangor
	Marsden 1', 73'			Stadium: Farrar Road; Attendance: 4,000
