= 1966–67 Arsenal F.C. season =

English football club season

Arsenal
1966–67 season
- Chairman: Denis Hill-Wood
- Manager: Bertie Mee Aliouche
- First Division: 7th
- FA Cup: Fifth Round
- League Cup: Third Round
- Top goalscorer: League: George Graham (11); All: George Graham (12)
- Highest home attendance: 63,563 vs Manchester United (3 March 1967)
- Lowest home attendance: 20,482 vs Sunderland A.F.C. (26 December 1966)
Home colours	Away colours	Third colours

During the 1966–67 English football season, Arsenal Football Club competed in the Football League First Division. Arsenal finished in seventh place in the league and failed to find success in the FA Cup. It was the team's first season participating in the League Cup and they went out in the third round to West Ham.

Prior to the season, Arsenal physiotherapist Bertie Mee was appointed manager. In the transfer business, he brought both George Graham and Bob McNab into the side. He also saw Peter Simpson become a first team regular.

Graham was the top scorer. Don Howe served as club captain but suffered from a broken leg early in the season, featuring in just one game under Mee.

== Season summary ==
Prior to the 1966-67 season, Bertie Mee had served as Arsenal's physiotherapist for six years. He was appointed manager for an initial 12 months, with an agreement he could revert to his previous position if it didn't work out. Mee's first act in charge was to transfer the sometimes erratic George Eastham to Stoke City.

Although Tommy Baldwin scored four goals early in the season in the League Cup, Mee soon swapped him, plus £75,000, for George Graham from Chelsea. Mee then brought in Bob McNab for £50,000 from Huddersfield Town, a then-record for a full back. He went on to be essential in the team for years to come. Mee also purchased Colin Addison from Nottingham Forest, though Addison failed to make an impact. Other players came through the club's own system, such as Peter Simpson who became a first team regular.

Mee's first season in charge began with a 3-1 win over Sunderland before beating West Ham, a team with three World Cup players (Bobby Moore, Martin Peters, and Geoff Hurst), 2-1 at home. Arsenal didn't lose until their fifth match, a 3-1 defeat away to Spurs. Arsenal were inconsistent, at one point dropping to sixteenth place. However, they finished the season out with an unbeaten run of 12 games, eventually finishing seventh.

Arsenal entered the League Cup for the first time as it now featured a Wembley final and automatic entry into the Fairs Cup. However, Arsenal began by tying Third Division Gillingham in their first game. After winning the replay 5-0, Arsenal were knocked out by losing 3-1 at home to West Ham. In the FA Cup, Arsenal beat Bristol Rovers and Bolton before being knocked out by Birmingham City.

== Final league table ==
Pos	Team	Pld	W	D	L	GF	GA	GAv	Pts	Qualification or relegation
5	Liverpool	42	19	13	10	64	47	1.362	51	Qualification for the Inter-Cities Fairs Cup first round
6	Everton	42	19	10	13	65	46	1.413	48	
7	Arsenal	42	16	14	12	58	47	1.234	46	
8	Leicester City	42	18	8	16	78	71	1.099	44	
9	Chelsea	42	15	14	13	67	62	1.081	44	

Source: World Football
Rules for classification: 1) Points; 2) Goal average; 3) Goals scored

== Results ==
Arsenal's score comes first

=== Legend ===
Win	Draw	Loss

=== Football League First Division ===
Date	Opponent	Venue	Result	Attendance	Scorers
20 August 1966	Sunderland	A	3–1		
23 August 1966	West Ham United	H	2–1		
27 August 1966	Aston Villa	H	1–0		
29 August 1966	West Ham United	A	2–2		
3 September 1966	Tottenham Hotspur	A	1–3		
6 September 1966	Sheffield Wednesday	H	1–1		
10 September 1966	Manchester City	A	1–1		
17 September 1966	Blackpool	H	1–1		
24 September 1966	Chelsea	A	1–3		
1 October 1966	Leicester City	H	2–4		
8 October 1966	Newcastle United	H	2–0		
15 October 1966	Leeds United	A	1–3		
22 October 1966	West Bromwich Albion	H	2–3		
29 October 1966	Manchester United	A	0–1		
5 November 1966	Leeds United	H	0–1		
12 November 1966	Everton	A	0–0		
19 November 1966	Fulham	H	1–0		
26 November 1966	Nottingham Forest	A	1–2		
3 December 1966	Burnley	H	0–0		
10 December 1966	Sheffield United	A	1–1		
17 December 1966	Sunderland	H	2–0		
26 December 1966	Southampton	H	4–1		
27 December 1966	Southampton	A	1–2		
31 December 1966	Aston Villa	A	1–0		
7 January 1967	Tottenham Hotspur	H	0–2		
14 January 1967	Manchester City	H	1–0		
21 January 1967	Blackpool	A	3–0		
4 February 1967	Chelsea	H	2–1		
11 February 1967	Leicester City	A	1–2		
25 February 1967	Newcastle United	A	1–2		
3 March 1967	Manchester United	H	1–1		
18 March 1967	West Bromwich Albion	A	1–0		
25 March 1967	Sheffield United	H	2–0		
27 March 1967	Liverpool	A	0–0		
28 March 1967	Liverpool	H	1–1		
1 April 1967	Stoke City	A	2–2		
19 April 1967	Fulham	A	0–0		
22 April 1967	Nottingham Forest	H	1–1		
25 April 1967	Everton	H	3–1		
29 April 1967	Burnley	A	4–1		
6 May 1967	Stoke City	H	3–1		
13 May 1967	Sheffield Wednesday	A	1–1		

=== FA Cup ===
Round	Date	Opponent	Venue	Result	Attendance	Scorers
R3	28 January 1967	Bristol Rovers	A	3–0		
R4	18 February 1967	Bolton Wanderers	A	0–0		
R4 R	22 February 1967	Bolton Wanderers	H	3–0		
R5	11 March 196	Birmingham City	A	0–1		

=== League Cup ===
Round	Date	Opponent	Venue	Result	Attendance	Scorers
R2	13 September 1966	Gillingham	H	1–1		
R2 R	21 September 1966	Gillingham	A	1–1 (aet)		
R2 2R	28 September 1966	Gillingham	H	5–0		
R3	5 October 1966	West Ham United	H	1–3		

=== Squad ===
Note: Flags indicate national team as defined under FIFA eligibility rules; some limited exceptions apply. Players may hold more than one non-FIFA nationality.

Pos.	Nation	Player
GK	SCO	Bob Wilson
GK	ENG	Jim Furnell
DF	ENG	David Court
DF	SCO	Ian Ure
DF	ENG	Peter Simpson
DF	NIR	Terry Neill
DF	ENG	Don Howe
DF	ENG	Peter Storey
DF	ENG	Bob McNab
MF	SCO	Frank McLintock
MF	ENG	Alan Tyrer
MF	ENG	George Armstrong
MF	ENG	Jon Sammels

Pos.	Nation	Player
MF	SCO	John Woodward
MF	SCO	Jimmy McGill
MF	WAL	Tom Walley
MF	ENG	Alan Skirton
FW	SCO	George Graham
FW	ENG	John Radford
FW	ENG	Colin Addison
FW	ENG	Micky Boot
FW	ENG	David Jenkins
FW	SCO	Gordon Neilson
FW	ENG	Tommy Baldwin
FW	SCO	Tommy Coakley
