= Richard Evans =

Richard Evans may refer to:

== Artists ==
- Richard Evans (designer) (born 1945), English artist for record album covers
- Richard Evans (portrait painter) (1784–1871), English portrait-painter and copyist

== Entertainment ==
- Dik Evans (born 1957), Irish rock guitarist
- Richard Evans (AI researcher) (born 1969), video game developer
- Richard Evans (actor) (1935–2021), American actor
- Richard Evans (radio presenter) (born 1958), British radio presenter
- Richard Bunger Evans (born 1942), American composer
- Richard Evans (Canadian composer), Canadian television score and new age composer
- Richard Evans, a character in the 1950 film State Penitentiary
- Rich Evans, American actor and filmmaker, co-head of Red Letter Media

== Religion ==
- R. C. Evans (1861–1921), Canadian leader in the Reorganized Church of Jesus Christ of Latter Day Saints; led schism in 1918
- Richard L. Evans (1906–1971), American leader in The Church of Jesus Christ of Latter-day Saints and radio announcer

== Politicians and diplomats ==
- Richard Evans (died 1762), British Whig politician, MP for Queenborough 1729–1754
- Richard Thomas Evans (1890–1946), British Liberal Party politician
- Dick Evans (politician) (1922–2008), Australian politician, NSW MLC
- Sir Richard Evans (British diplomat) (1928–2012), British diplomat
- Richard Evans (Australian politician) (born 1953), Australian Liberal Party member, represented Cowen in the House of Representatives, 1993–1998
- Richard Evans (Maine politician), American physician and politician, Maine House of Representatives 2020–2022

== Sports ==
- Dick Evans (footballer) (1874–1942), English footballer
- Dick Evans (athlete) (1915–2008), American professional basketball and football player
- Richard Evans (Australian cricketer) (1867–1939), Australian cricketer
- Richard Evans (South African cricketer) (1914–1943), South African cricketer
- Richard Evans (rugby league) (born 1945), rugby league footballer of the 1970s for Wales, Barrow, Swinton, and Salford
- Richard Evans (executive), American sports and entertainment executive
- Richard Evans (footballer, born 1968), Welsh former footballer
- Richard Evans (footballer, born 1983), Welsh football midfielder for Birmingham, Sheffield Wednesday and Shrewsbury
- Richie Evans (1941–1985), American racecar driver in NASCAR
- Ricky Evans (rugby union) (born 1960), Welsh rugby union international
- Richard Evans (swimmer), Welsh swimmer

== Others ==
- Richard Evans (1778–1864), British colliery owner
- Richard Evans (1811–1887), son of Richard Evans (1778–1864)
- Richard Evans (journalist) (born 1939), British tennis journalist and author
- Richard Evans (businessman) (born 1942), English business executive, known as Dick Evans; chancellor of the University of Central Lancashire
- Sir Richard J. Evans (born 1947), British historian and commentator
- Richard Paul Evans (born 1962), American author of books with Christian themes; best known for 1995's The Christmas Box
- Evans, the defendant in the landmark Supreme Court case Romer v. Evans
- Richard Evans (lifeboatman) (1905–2001)

== See also ==
- Richard Evans Schultes (1915–2001), American ethnobotanist, conservationist and author
- Ricky Evans (disambiguation)
- List of people named Evans
- Evans (surname)
