= 1977–78 Newport County A.F.C. season =

Welsh association football club season

Newport County
1977–78 season
- Chairman: Richard Ford
- Manager: Colin Addison
- Stadium: Somerton Park
- Fourth Division: 16th
- FA Cup: 1st round
- League Cup: 1st round
- Welsh Cup: 5th round
- Top goalscorer: League: Goddard (17); All: Goddard (19)
- Highest home attendance: 8,409 vs Watford (17 March 1978)
- Lowest home attendance: 2,112 vs Wimbledon (25 April 1978)
- Average home league attendance: 4,061
Home colours	Away colours

The 1977–78 season was Newport County's 16th consecutive season in the Football League Fourth Division and their 50th season overall in the Football League. Despite the eventual lowly 16th-place finish, this season was a much-improved performance over the previous season's relegation battle. The club was actually in third place with promotion looking likely with ten games to go, but those games yielded a mere three points and County missed out again on a return to the Third Division.

== Season review ==
=== Results summary ===
Overall								Home						Away					
Pld	W	D	L	GF	GA	GD	Pts	W	D	L	GF	GA	GD	W	D	L	GF	GA	GD
46	16	11	19	65	73	−8	43	14	6	3	43	22	+21	2	5	16	22	51	−29

Source: rsssf.com

=== Results by round ===
Round	1	2	3	4	5	6	7	8	9	10	11	12	13	14	15	16	17	18	19	20	21	22	23	24	25	26	27	28	29	30	31	32	33	34	35	36	37	38	39	40	41	42	43	44	45	46
Ground	A	H	A	H	H	A	A	H	A	H	H	A	H	A	H	A	H	A	H	A	H	A	A	H	A	H	A	A	H	A	A	H	H	H	A	H	A	H	A	H	A	A	H	A	H	H
Result	D	W	L	W	D	L	W	W	L	W	W	D	D	L	D	W	W	D	W	L	W	D	L	W	L	W	L	L	W	L	L	W	W	W	L	D	L	L	L	D	L	L	D	D	L	L
Position	11	7	12	7	7	10	8	7	9	7	6	6	6	7	8	6	5	4	4	4	5	5	5	5	5	6	6	8	4	5	7	6	4	3	3	3	5	10	10	9	10	11	10	13	15	16

Updated to match(es) played on 29 Apr 1978. Source: statto.com
A = Away; H = Home; W = Win; D = Draw; L = Loss

== Fixtures and results ==
=== Fourth Division ===
Date	Opponents	Venue	Result	Scorers	Attendance
20 Aug 1977	Doncaster Rovers	A	2–2	Preece, Clark	3,041
27 Aug 1977	Huddersfield Town	H	2–0	Woods, S.Walker	3,367
3 Sep 1977	Barnsley	A	0–1		4,009
6 Sep 1977	York City	H	2–1	Woods, OG	2,987
10 Sep 1977	Darlington	H	1–1	Woods	2,776
14 Sep 1977	Crewe Alexandra	A	0–2		1,812
17 Sep 1977	Rochdale	A	1–0	Woods	1,116
24 Sep 1977	Swansea City	H	1–0	Goddard	5,156
27 Sep 1977	Wimbledon	A	0–3		3,941
1 Oct 1977	Grimsby Town	H	3–0	Preece 2, Woods	2,746
4 Oct 1977	Scunthorpe United	H	3–1	Woods 3	3,191
8 Oct 1977	Aldershot	A	2–2	Preece, Woods	3,452
15 Oct 1977	Stockport County	H	2–2	Preece, S.Walker	4,083
22 Oct 1977	Watford	A	0–2		10,475
29 Oct 1977	Torquay United	H	0–0		4,137
5 Nov 1977	Northampton Town	A	4–2	Goddard 2, Emmanuel, R.Walker	3,568
12 Nov 1977	Halifax Town	H	2–0	Guscott, Woods	3,992
19 Nov 1977	Southport	A	3–3	Clark. Goddard, Williams	1,167
3 Dec 1977	Hartlepool United	H	4–2	R.Walker, Goddard, Clark, Emmanuel	3,233
9 Dec 1977	Southend United	A	2–4	Clark, Goddard	5,840
26 Dec 1977	Bournemouth	H	3–2	Williams 2, Clark	7,629
27 Dec 1977	Brentford	A	3–3	Williams 2, Preece	8,970
31 Dec 1977	Reading	A	0–2		5,808
2 Jan 1978	Northampton Town	H	5–3	Goddard 2, Clark 2, Jones	7,160
7 Jan 1978	York City	A	0–2		1,971
14 Jan 1978	Doncaster Rovers	H	1–0	Williams	4,029
21 Jan 1978	Huddersfield Town	A	0–2		4,894
4 Feb 1978	Darlington	A	1–2	Clark	1,744
11 Feb 1978	Rochdale	H	3–0	Goddard 3	4,288
17 Feb 1978	Swansea City	A	0–4		6,056
25 Feb 1978	Grimsby Town	A	0–1		3,937
28 Feb 1978	Barnsley	H	3–1	Goddard 2, R.Walker	3,523
4 Mar 1978	Aldershot	H	2–1	Aizlewood, Clark	3,737
7 Mar 1978	Crewe Alexandra	H	1–0	Preece	4,774
10 Mar 1978	Stockport County	A	0–2		3,863
17 Mar 1978	Watford	H	2–2	Goddard, R.Walker	8,409
22 Mar 1978	Torquay United	A	0–2		3,055
25 Mar 1978	Brentford	H	1–2	Goddard	4,953
28 Mar 1978	Bournemouth	A	2–4	Williams, Jones	2,479
1 Apr 1978	Reading	H	0–0		2,333
4 Apr 1978	Scunthorpe United	A	0–2		2,457
8 Apr 1978	Halifax Town	A	1–3	Goddard	1,653
15 Apr 1978	Southport	H	1–1	Sinclair	2,440
22 Apr 1978	Hartlepool United	A	1–1	Goddard	1,988
25 Apr 1978	Wimbledon	H	0–1		2,112
29 Apr 1978	Southend United	H	1–2	Emmanuel	2,364

=== FA Cup ===
Round	Date	Opponents	Venue	Result	Scorers	Attendance
1	26 Nov 1977	Exeter City	H	1–1	Goddard	6,229
1r	30 Nov 1977	Exeter City	A	2–4	Goddard, Clark	5,713

=== Football League Cup ===
Round	Date	Opponents	Venue	Result	Scorers	Attendance	Notes
1–1	13 Aug 1977	Portsmouth	A	1–3	Woods	7,541	
1–2	16 Aug 1977	Portsmouth	H	3–2	R.Walker, Preece, Clark	2,895	4–5 agg

=== Welsh Cup ===
Round	Date	Opponents	Venue	Result	Scorers	Attendance
4	17 Jan 1978	Swansea City	A	0–0		7,504
4r	24 Jan 1978	Swansea City	H	1–0	Williams	6,098
5	14 Feb 1978	Bangor City	H	1–3	R.Walker	3,604

== League table ==
Pos	Team	Pld	W	D	L	GF	GA	GD	Pts
14	Scunthorpe United	46	14	16	16	50	55	−5	44
15	Crewe Alexandra	46	15	14	17	50	69	−19	44
16	Newport County	46	16	11	19	65	73	−8	43
17	Bournemouth	46	14	15	17	41	51	−10	43
18	Stockport County	46	16	10	20	56	56	0	42
