= Peter Bennett (footballer, born 1946) =

English footballer (1946–2024)

Personal information
- Date of birth: 24 June 1946
- Place of birth: Hillingdon, Middlesex, England
- Date of death: 22 March 2024 (aged 77)
- Position: Inside forward

Youth career
- 1961–1963: West Ham United

Senior career*
Years	Team	Apps	(Gls)
1963–1971	West Ham United	42	(3)
1970–1979	Orient	199	(13)
1977	→ St. Louis Stars (loan)	22	(2)
Total		264	(18)
- * Club domestic league appearances and goals

Peter Bennett (24 June 1946 – 22 March 2024) was an English professional footballer who played as an inside-forward in the Football League for West Ham United and Orient. He also had a stint in the North American Soccer League with St. Louis Stars.

Bennett attended Abbotsfield School and started his football career as an apprentice with West Ham United in 1961. He joined the club along with John Sissons after the pair were spotted by scout Charlie Faulkner while playing for Middlesex Schoolboys. He played in the side that won the FA Youth Cup in 1963, wearing the number 8 shirt in a team that featured the likes of Harry Redknapp and John Charles. The final against Liverpool saw the team fight back from a first-leg defeat of 3–1 to win 6–5 on aggregate. He signed professional forms later that year and made his First Division debut on 4 April 1964, a home game against Bolton Wanderers. He scored his first goal for the club in a 6–2 defeat by Chelsea at Stamford Bridge on 9 April 1966.

Bennett went on to make 47 league and cup appearances, scoring three goals, for the Upton Park club.

In 1970, he moved to Division Two club Orient in a deal that saw Tommy Taylor move in the opposite direction. Orient received £63,000. Bennett was soon made club captain and was part of the team that narrowly missed out on promotion in 1973–74.

In May 1977, Bennett and teammate John Jackson joined up with NASL club St. Louis Stars. A deal with the Orient had been reached in March, but with the Orient still attempting to navigate their way through the season, Bennet's release was delayed.

Back at the Orient, Bennett was part of the team that reached the FA Cup semi-final in 1978. His career was ended by an ankle injury, and he retired after the 1978–79 season, having made in excess of 200 appearances in all competitions for the O's during his seven years at the club. After which, he joined the Orient coaching staff.

His son, Warren Bennett, plays on the international golf circuit.

Peter Bennett died on 22 March 2024, at the age of 77.
