= Ricky Evans =

Ricky Evans may refer to:

- Ricky Evans (rugby union) (born 1960), Welsh rugby union player
- Ricky Evans (darts player) (born 1990), English darts player

== See also ==
- Richard Evans (disambiguation)
