= Bobby Park =

Bobby Park may refer to:

- Bobby Park (footballer, born 1946), Scottish footballer
- Bobby Park (footballer, born 1952), Scottish footballer
