= Colin Clish =

English footballer

Personal information
- Full name: Colin Clish
- Date of birth: 14 January 1944 (age 82)
- Place of birth: Hetton-le-Hole, County Durham, England
- Position: Left back

Youth career
- Newcastle United

Senior career*
Years	Team	Apps	(Gls)
1961–1963	Newcastle United	20	(0)
1963–1968	Rotherham United	128	(4)
1968–1971	Doncaster Rovers	100	(4)
1971–197?	Gainsborough Trinity		
- * Club domestic league appearances and goals

Colin Clish (born 14 January 1944) is a former footballer who played as a left back for Newcastle United, Rotherham United and Doncaster Rovers.

As well as playing football, Clish was a cricketer, playing as a batsman for Durham Colts and Durham County Juniors in 1961 and 1962.

Before his senior career, he played for Chester-le-Street Schools and Durham County Schools under 15s in 1957–59 alongside Alan Suddick and Norman Hunter.

== Senior club career ==
=== Newcastle United ===
He started his football career playing for Newcastle United in the English Second Division, his debut was at left back in a 2–2 draw at Sheffield United in the League Cup on 2 October 1961.

Clish captained the club's Youth Cup winning team in 1962. During his time at the club he played in 23 League and Cup matches.

=== Rotherham United ===
Clish signed for fellow 2nd Division side Rotherham United in December 1963, for £5,000.

=== Doncaster Rovers ===
As part of a deal including several players swapping teams, he moved to English Division 4 club Doncaster Rovers in February 1968. His debut was in a 2–0 home victory against Brentford on 10 February 1968. In that April he scored both goals in a 2–2 draw with Bradford City.

The following year he played a significant part in Doncaster's title winning season as they gained promotion to Division 3. In August 1969 he broke his leg in a game at Shrewsbury Town which put him out till that December. He was never quite the same player after this.

After a total of 111 League and Cup appearances, and 4 goals, Doncaster released Clish at the end of the 1971–72 season, with him going on to play for Gainsborough Trinity for a while.

== Honours ==
Newcastle United

- FA Youth Cup winner 1962

Doncaster Rovers

- English Division 4 winner 1968–69

== Personal life ==
Following football, Clish worked for British Transport Police being based at Doncaster Station, retiring in 2003.
