= John Saunders (footballer, born Newport) =

Welsh footballer

Personal information
- Full name: John Saunders
- Place of birth: Newport, Wales
- Position: Centre back

Youth career
- Birmingham City

Senior career*
Years	Team	Apps	(Gls)
1970–1971	Newport County	30	
1971–1972	Leeds United	0	(0)
1972–1976	Walsall	99	(2)
- * Club domestic league appearances and goals

John Saunders (born 1950) is a former professional footballer, who played for Newport County, Leeds United, and Walsall.

== Career ==
Saunders was a Welsh schoolboy international and in 1966 Birmingham City beat four other clubs to sign him, a promise to let him train as a carpenter sealing the deal. He played in the both legs of the 1966–67 FA Youth Cup final defeat to Sunderland. He did not however break through into the first team and in 1970 joined his hometown club Newport County.

After a season with County, during which he made 30 appearances, he was picked up by Leeds United, who watched him in six of those games, as an understudy to Jack Charlton, at a fee reported as being as £7,000 (plus add-ons for appearances) and £12,000.

However Saunders was injured in a reserve match soon after joining United, and Leeds signed Roy Ellam as cover for Charlton instead, leaving Saunders surplus to requirements. In October 1972 therefore Football League Third Division leaders Walsall signed Saunders for "a small fee".

Saunders was a Walsall regular until the 1975–76 season, losing his place towards the end to Roger Fry, and he left professional football at the end of the season.
