= Keith Coleman =

Keith Coleman may refer to:

- Keith Coleman (footballer) (born 1951), retired English footballer
- Keith Coleman, owner of Keith Coleman Racing, a NASCAR Busch Series team
