= Geoff Barnett (footballer) =

English footballer (1946–2021)

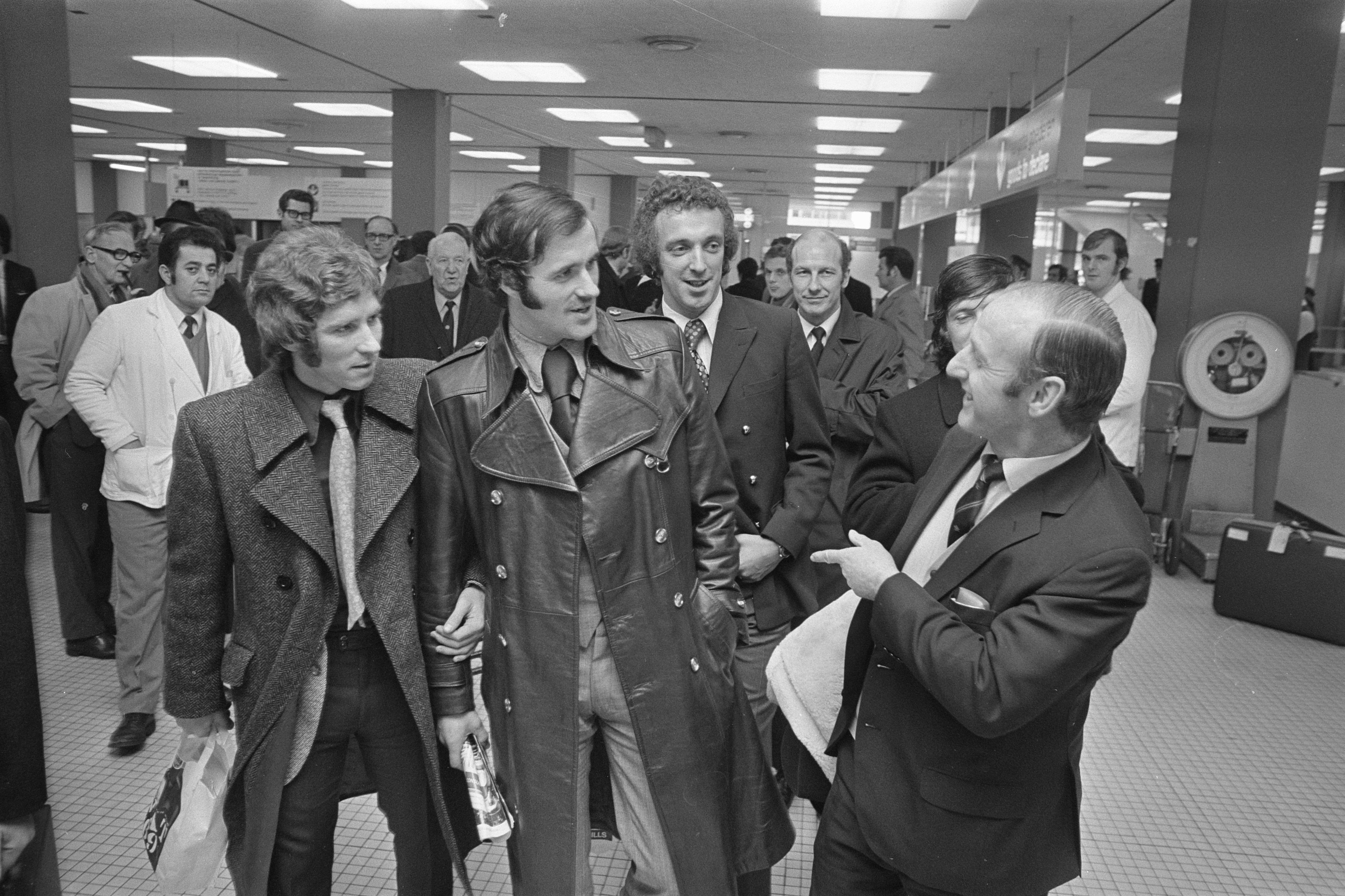
- Barnett (1972) -second row, curly hair

Personal information
- Full name: Geoffrey Colin Barnett
- Date of birth: 16 October 1946
- Place of birth: Northwich, England
- Date of death: 15 January 2021 (aged 74)
- Place of death: Fort Myers, Florida, U.S.
- Position: Goalkeeper

Senior career*
| Years | Team | Apps | (Gls) |
| 1962–1969 | Everton | 10 | (0) |
| 1969–1976 | Arsenal | 49 | (0) |
| 1976–1980 | Minnesota Kicks | 67 | (0) |
| Total | | 126 | (0) |

International career
- England U21

Managerial career
- 1981: Minnesota Kicks
- * Club domestic league appearances and goals

Geoffrey Colin Barnett (16 October 1946 – 15 January 2021) was an English footballer who played as a goalkeeper.

== Career ==
Barnett played as a goalkeeper and started out at Everton in 1962, winning the 1965 FA Youth Cup and gaining schoolboy and U21 honours with England. However, with the goalkeeping spot being dominated by Gordon West and Andy Rankin through most of the 1960s, Barnett could only be content with being their understudy, making just ten league appearances in seven seasons for the Toffees, all in his final three seasons.

In October 1969, Barnett was hurriedly signed for £35,000 by Arsenal after their No. 1 goalkeeper Bob Wilson broke his arm early in the season, and Barnett made his debut against Coventry City on 4 October 1969. Barnett made 11 league appearances and successfully kept a clean sheet over both legs against Sporting CP in the Inter-Cities Fairs Cup Second Round (saving a penalty in the goalless first leg), but once Wilson recovered from his injury, Barnett was relegated to the reserves and Wilson was in goal for the final.

Barnett missed out entirely on Arsenal's 1970–71 Double-winning season but after an injury to Wilson late on in the 1971–72 season, played against Leeds United in the 1972 FA Cup Final. He was blameless for the goal which saw Arsenal lose 1–0 in a match better known for ill-discipline rather than the quality of play. Barnett started the 1972–73 season as Wilson struggled to recover from injury, playing 25 matches (of his 49 appearances), but Wilson always assumed the goalkeeper's jersey ahead of Barnett when fully fit. He made no appearances in over 2 years, between 24 February 1973, and 26 April 1975.

After Arsenal signed Jimmy Rimmer as Wilson's long-term replacement in February 1974 (Wilson would retire from the game that summer), it was clear Barnett would never take the No. 1 spot at Arsenal full-time. Nevertheless, he stayed loyal to Arsenal and played for another two years as Rimmer's understudy, his last appearance coming against Stoke City on 13 December 1975 (his only match in the 1975/6 season). In January 1976, he left Arsenal to join the Minnesota Kicks in the US; in total he played 49 matches for Arsenal, with only an FA Cup runners-up medal to his name.

Barnett stayed in America for a number of years, briefly becoming the Kicks' coach on 14 May 1981. He had a record of 16–10. The team folded after the 1981 NASL season However, he never pursued a career in management and eventually returned to England. He ran a pub, the George & Dragon, in Holmes Chapel in his native Cheshire until 2010.

== Death ==
Barnett died from complications of COVID-19 in Fort Myers, Florida, on 15 January 2021. He was 74 years old.

== Honours ==
Everton

- FA Youth Cup: 1965

Arsenal

- FA Cup runner-up: 1971–72

Minnesota Kicks

- Soccer Bowl runner-up: 1976
