= Colin Mackleworth =

English footballer

Personal information
- Full name: Colin Mackleworth
- Date of birth: 24 March 1947 (age 79)
- Place of birth: Bow, London, England
- Position: Goalkeeper

Senior career*
Years	Team	Apps	(Gls)
1962–1967	West Ham United	3	(0)
1967–1971	Leicester City	6	(0)
- Kettering Town
- Clapton
- Metropolitan Police
- * Club domestic league appearances and goals

Colin Mackleworth (born 24 March 1947) is a former footballer who played for West Ham United and Leicester City as a goalkeeper.

== Football career ==
Mackleworth joined West Ham United in 1962 as an apprentice. He played in West Ham's Youth Cup winning side of 1963 making his first-team debut in December 1966 in a 4–0 home win against Blackpool. Serving as understudy to regular goalkeeper, Jim Standen, he made only three appearances; his last being in a famous Manchester United 6–1 victory at Upton Park in which Manchester United won the 1966–67 Football League trophy. He left West Ham in November 1967 and joined Leicester City. Mackleworth failed to make an impact at Leicester and was understudy to Peter Shilton. Making only six appearances he joined Kettering Town. Following his stint at Kettering, Mackleworth moved back to London, playing for both Clapton and Metropolitan Police.

== After football ==
After he left professional football he joined the Metropolitan Police Force serving at Bow police station where he was often on duty at West Ham's ground, Upton Park.
