= Peter Cruse =

English footballer (born 1951)

Personal information
- Full name: Peter Leonard Cruse
- Date of birth: 10 January 1951 (age 75)
- Place of birth: Camden, England
- Position: Midfielder

Senior career*
Years	Team	Apps	(Gls)
- Hoddesdon Town
- Wembley
1970-1971	Cheshunt	33	(6)
1971–1972	Slough Town	26	(5)
1972–1973	Arsenal	0	(0)
1973–1974	Luton Town	4	(0)
1974	→ Shrewsbury Town (loan)	2	(0)
- Enfield
1975	Barking	3	(0)
- Staines Town
1976–1977	Wycombe Wanderers		
1977	Slough Town	2	(0)
- Msida Saint-Joseph

International career
1972	England amateurs	2	(1)
- * Club domestic league appearances and goals

Peter Leonard Cruse (born 10 January 1951) is an English former professional footballer who played as a midfielder.

== Club career ==
Following time at Hoddesdon Town, Wembley and Cheshunt, Cruse signed for Slough Town in time for the 1971–72 season. Following 16 goals in 48 games for Slough in all competitions, Cruse signed for Arsenal alongside Slough teammate John Ritchie in April 1972.

In July 1973, after failing to break into the first team at Arsenal, Cruse signed for Luton Town. After four Football League appearances at Luton, Cruse was loaned out to Shrewsbury Town, making two appearances, before an ankle injury ended Cruse's career in the Football League.

Following Cruse's time at Luton, he dropped back down into non-league, signing for Enfield. In 1975, Cruse signed for Barking, making seven appearances in all competitions, before joining Staines Town. During the 1976–77 season, Cruse made 15 appearances for Wycombe Wanderers. At the beginning of the 1977–78 season, Cruse returned to Slough, making three appearances in all competitions, before moving to Malta, to play for Msida Saint-Joseph.

== International career ==
During his time at Slough, Cruse made two appearances for England amateurs in 1972, scoring against their Scottish counterparts at Springfield Park.
