= Bobby Noble (footballer, born 1945) =

English footballer (1945–2023)

Personal information
- Full name: Robert Noble
- Date of birth: 18 December 1945
- Place of birth: Reddish, Stockport, England
- Date of death: 22 August 2023 (aged 77)
- Height: 5 ft 7 in (1.70 m)
- Position: Defender

Youth career
- 1961–1962: Manchester United

Senior career*
Years	Team	Apps	(Gls)
1962–1970	Manchester United	31	(0)
- * Club domestic league appearances and goals

Robert Noble (18 December 1945 – 22 August 2023) was an English footballer who played as a full back in the Football League for Manchester United.

== Career ==
Born in Reddish, Stockport, on 18 December 1945, Noble signed for Manchester United as a trainee in 1961 and turned professional the following year. He made his Football League debut on 9 April 1966 in a 2–1 home defeat to Leicester City, and became a regular in the side that won the league title in 1967. However he was seriously injured in a car crash just before United sealed the title. He recovered from the injuries which almost claimed his life, but his attempts to recover full fitness proved unsuccessful and he retired from playing three years later.

== Death ==
Noble died on 22 August 2023, at the age of 77.
