= David Jenkins (footballer) =

English footballer

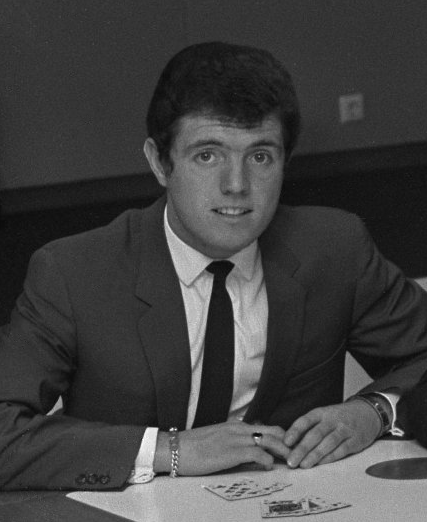
- Jenkins in November 1967.

Personal information
- Full name: David John Jenkins
- Date of birth: 2 September 1946 (age 80)
- Place of birth: Bristol, England
- Height: 5 ft 8 1/2 in (1.74 m)
- Position: Forward

Youth career
- 1963–1967: Arsenal

Senior career*
Years	Team	Apps	(Gls)
1967–1968	Arsenal	17	(3)
1968–1972	Tottenham Hotspur	14	(2)
1972–1973	Brentford	18	(1)
1973	→ Hereford United (loan)	10	(2)
1973–1974	Hereford United	13	(0)
1974	→ Newport County (loan)	6	(1)
1974–1975	Shrewsbury Town	2	(1)
1975	Durban City	6	(1)
1975–1976	Workington	6	(0)
- Dorchester Town
- Malvern Town
- Guisborough Town
- * Club domestic league appearances and goals

David John Jenkins (born 2 September 1946) is an English retired professional football forward who played in the Football League, most notably for Arsenal and Tottenham Hotspur.

He joined Arsenal as an apprentice in 1963 and showed promise as a talented winger. He made his senior debut in a 2nd round League Cup replay against Gillingham in September 1966 shortly after turning 20. His league debut came against West Ham United in November 1967, when he came on as a sub for George Graham.

Jenkins played in the 1968 League Cup final, in which he was injured in a collision with Leeds United goalkeeper, Gary Sprake. However, he did not secure a regular place in the Arsenal side until the following season when he made 14 league appearances, scoring three goals, before being swapped in mid-October for Tottenham's winger, Jimmy Robertson.

His final game for Arsenal was against Coventry City on 12 October 1968, when, as it happened, he came off to be replaced by George Graham. He made his debut for Tottenham seven days later against Liverpool.

Both Jenkins and Robertson had limited opportunities at their new clubs and moved on after a couple of seasons, Jenkins to Brentford and Robertson to Ipswich Town.

== Career statistics ==
Appearances and goals by club, season and competition
Club	Season	League			FA Cup		League Cup		Other		Total	
Club	Season	Division	Apps	Goals	Apps	Goals	Apps	Goals	Apps	Goals	Apps	Goals
Arsenal	1966–67	First Division	0	0	0	0	2	1	—		2	1
Arsenal	1967–68	First Division	3	0	2	1	2	1	—		7	2
Arsenal	1968–69	First Division	14	3	—		2	3	—		16	6
Arsenal	Total		17	3	2	1	6	4	—		25	9
Tottenham Hotspur	1968–69	First Division	11	2	3	0	—		—		14	2
Tottenham Hotspur	1969–70	First Division	3	0	0	0	0	0	—		3	0
Tottenham Hotspur	Total		14	2	3	0	0	0	—		17	2
Brentford	1972–73	Third Division	18	1	0	0	1	0	—		19	1
Hereford United (loan)	1972–73	Fourth Division	10	2	—		—		3 (Note: 2 appearances in Herefordshire Senior Cup, 1 appearance in Len Weston Cup.)	0	13	2
Hereford United	1973–74	Third Division	13	0	1	0	1	0	1 (Note: Appearance in Welsh Cup.)	1	16	1
Total		23	2	1	0	1	0	4	1	29	3	
Career total			72	8	6	1	8	4	4	1	90	15

== Honours ==
Arsenal

- Football League Cup runner-up: 1967–68
