= David Stocks =

English footballer (born 1943)

Personal information
- Full name: David Henry Stocks
- Date of birth: 20 April 1943 (age 83)
- Place of birth: Dulwich, England
- Position: Defender

Senior career*
Years	Team	Apps	(Gls)
1962–1965	Charlton Athletic	26	(0)
1965–1966	Gillingham	45	(0)
1966-–1972	Bournemouth	220	(2)
1972–1977	Torquay United	150	(3)
Total		441	(5)
- * Club domestic league appearances and goals

David Henry Stocks (born 20 April 1943) is an English former professional footballer who played as a defender for Charlton Athletic, Gillingham, Bournemouth and Torquay United. In total he made 461 appearances in the Football League between 1961 and 1977, scoring five goals.
