= Fred McIver =

English footballer

Personal information
- Full name: Frederick McIver
- Date of birth: 14 February 1952
- Place of birth: Birtley, Tyne and Wear, England
- Position: Midfielder

Senior career*
Years	Team	Apps	(Gls)
1969–1972	Sunderland	1	(0)
1972–1973	King's Park		
1973–1974	Racing Jet de Bruxelles		
1974–1976	Sheffield Wednesday	37	(0)
1976–19??	Gateshead United		
- * Club domestic league appearances and goals

Frederick McIver (born 14 February 1952) was an English professional footballer who played as a midfielder for Sunderland.
