= Colin Hall =

English footballer

Personal information
- Full name: Colin Thomas Hall
- Date of birth: 2 February 1948 (age 78)
- Place of birth: Wolverhampton, England
- Position: Right winger

Youth career
- –: Nottingham Forest

Senior career*
Years	Team	Apps	(Gls)
1967–1970	Nottingham Forest	36	(2)
1970–1972	Bradford City	66	(7)
1972–1973	Bristol City	1	(0)
1973	→ Hereford United (loan)	5	(0)
–	Bath City	?	(?)
1978–1980	Gloucester City	32	(3)
- Chelmsford City
Total		140	(12)
- * Club domestic league appearances and goals

Colin Thomas Hall (born 2 February 1948) is an English former professional footballer who played as a right winger.

== Career ==
Born in Wolverhampton, Hall began his career as a trainee with Nottingham Forest, turning professional in 1966, and making his senior debut a year later. He also played for Bradford City, Bristol City and Hereford United, making a total of 108 appearances in the Football League. He later played non-League football for Bath City.
