= Ken Wallace (footballer) =

English footballer (born 1952)

Personal information
- Full name: Kenneth Robert Wallace
- Date of birth: 8 June 1952 (age 74)
- Place of birth: Islington, England
- Position: Forward

Youth career
- 1969–1971: West Ham United

Senior career*
| Years | Team | Apps | (Gls) |
| 1971–1972 | West Ham United | 0 | (0) |
| 1971 | → Montreal Olympique (loan) | 22 | (8) |
| 1972 | → Brentford (loan) | 3 | (0) |
| 1972 | → Montreal Olympique (loan) | 9 | (2) |
| 1972–1973 | Hereford United | 32 | (4) |
| 1973–1974 | Exeter City | 10 | (1) |
| 1974–1975 | Dover | | (4) |
- Maidstone United
| 1980–1981 | Welling United | | |
| 1981–1982 | Chelmsford City | 16 | (0) |
| 1982–1984 | Crawley Town | 37 | (4) |
- Sheppey United
- Erith & Belvedere
- * Club domestic league appearances and goals

Kenneth Robert Wallace (born 8 June 1952) is an English retired professional footballer who played as a forward in the Football League for Hereford United, Exeter City and Brentford. He was the scorer of Hereford United's first-ever Football League goal in 1972.

== Personal life ==
After his retirement from football, Wallace settled in Bexleyheath.

== Career statistics ==
Appearances and goals by club, season and competition
| Club | Season | League | | | National cup (Note: Includes FA Cup) | | League cup (Note: Includes Football League Cup, Southern League Cup) | | Other | | Total | |
| Club | Season | Division | Apps | Goals | Apps | Goals | Apps | Goals | Apps | Goals | Apps | Goals |
|---|---|---|---|---|---|---|---|---|---|---|---|---|
| West Ham United | 1971–72 | First Division | 0 | 0 | 0 | 0 | 0 | 0 | — | | 0 | 0 |
| Montreal Olympique (loan) | 1971 | North American Soccer League | 22 | 8 | — | | — | | — | | 22 | 8 |
| Brentford (loan) | 1971–72 | Fourth Division | 3 | 0 | — | | — | | — | | 3 | 0 |
| Montreal Olympique (loan) | 1972 | North American Soccer League | 9 | 2 | — | | — | | — | | 9 | 2 |
| Hereford United | 1972–73 | Fourth Division | 32 | 4 | 1 | 0 | 1 | 0 | 7 (Note: 2 appearances and 1 goal in Welsh Cup, 1 appearance and 1 goal in Worcestershire Senior Cup, 1 appearance in Southern League Cup, 1 appearance in Len Weston Cup, 1 appearance in Herefordshire Senior Cup.) | 2 | 41 | 6 |
| Crawley Town | 1981–82 | Southern League First Division South | 10 | 0 | — | | — | | — | | 10 | 0 |
| Crawley Town | 1982–83 | Southern League First Division South | 22 | 4 | 1 | 0 | 3 | 0 | 8 (Note: 4 appearances in FA Trophy, 3 appearances in Gilbert Rice Floodlight Cup, 1 appearance in Sussex Senior Cup) | 0 | 34 | 4 |
| Crawley Town | 1983–84 | Southern League First Division South | 4 | 0 | 0 | 0 | 0 | 0 | 1 (Note: Appearance in Gilbert Rice Floodlight Cup) | 0 | 5 | 0 |
| Crawley Town | 1984–85 | Southern League Premier Division | 1 | 0 | 0 | 0 | 0 | 0 | 0 | 0 | 1 | 0 |
| Crawley Town | Total | | 37 | 4 | 1 | 0 | 3 | 0 | 9 | 0 | 50 | 4 |
| Career total | | | 103 | 18 | 2 | 0 | 4 | 0 | 16 | 2 | 125 | 20 |
