= Albert Phelan =

English footballer

Personal information
- Full name: Albert Phelan
- Date of birth: 27 April 1945
- Place of birth: Sheffield, England
- Date of death: 18 April 2016 (aged 70)
- Place of death: Sheffield, England
- Position: Central defender

Senior career*
Years	Team	Apps	(Gls)
1964-1974	Chesterfield	391	(14)
1974–1976	Halifax Town	118	(4)
- * Club domestic league appearances and goals

Albert Phelan (27 April 1945 – 18 April 2016) was an English footballer.

Phelan joined Chesterfield from local non-league side Charlton United in 1964. He joined Halifax Town in 1974.

After retiring from playing he spent five years at Boston United, the last two as manager. He went on to serve Sheffield Wednesday in a number of scouting and coaching roles.
