= George Scott (footballer, born 1944) =

Scottish footballer

Personal information
- Full name: George William Scott
- Date of birth: 25 October 1944 (age 82)
- Place of birth: Aberdeen, Scotland
- Position: Midfielder

Youth career
- 1960–1963: Liverpool

Senior career*
Years	Team	Apps	(Gls)
1963–1965	Liverpool	3	(1)
1965–1966	Aberdeen	8	(2)
1966–1968	Port Elizabeth City	62	(31)
1968–1970	Tranmere Rovers	44	(2)
Total		104	(36)
- * Club domestic league appearances and goals

George William Scott (born 25 October 1944) is a Scottish footballer who played as a midfielder in the Football League for Tranmere Rovers.

A autobiography, The Lost Shankly Boy (written along with Jeff Goulding) detailing Scott's time as a fringe player at Liverpool in the early 1960s, was published in 2021.

== Honours ==
Port Elizabeth City

- National Football League: 1967
