= Trevor Rhodes (footballer, born 1948) =

English footballer

Personal information
- Full name: Trevor Charles Rhodes
- Date of birth: 9 August 1948 (age 78)
- Place of birth: Southend, England
- Position: Wing half

Senior career*
Years	Team	Apps	(Gls)
1965–1966	Arsenal	0 L	(0)
1966–1968	Millwall	4	(0)
1968–1969	Bristol Rovers	2	(0)
- * Club domestic league appearances and goals

Trevor Charles Rhodes (born 9 August 1948) is an English former professional footballer. Rhodes, who played as a defender, featured for Southend United, Arsenal, Millwall, Bristol Rovers & Bath City in his career.
