= Ricky Marlowe =

Scottish footballer

Personal information
- Full name: Richard Ronald Marlowe
- Date of birth: 10 August 1950 (age 76)
- Place of birth: Edinburgh, Scotland
- Position: Forward

Senior career*
Years	Team	Apps	(Gls)
19??–1972	Bonnyrigg Rose Athletic		
1972–1973	Derby County	0	(0)
1973–1974	Shrewsbury Town	31	(4)
1974–1976	Brighton & Hove Albion	25	(5)
1975–1976	→ Aldershot (loan)	2	(0)
1976–1977	Wimbledon	37	(7)
- * Club domestic league appearances and goals

Richard Ronald Marlowe (born 10 August 1950) is a Scottish former professional footballer who played as a forward in the English Football League for Shrewsbury Town, Brighton & Hove Albion and Aldershot. He began his career with junior club Bonnyrigg Rose Athletic, was on the books of Derby County without representing them in the League, and went on to win the 1976–77 Southern League title with Wimbledon.
