= Bruce Walker (footballer) =

English footballer

Personal information
- Date of birth: 27 August 1946 (age 80)
- Place of birth: Hungerford, England
- Position: Left winger

Senior career*
Years	Team	Apps	(Gls)
1965–1968	Swindon Town	29	(5)
1968–1969	Bradford City	28	(1)
1969–1970	Exeter City	24	(2)
- Hereford United
Total		81	(8)
- * Club domestic league appearances and goals

Bruce Walker (born 27 August 1946) is an English former professional footballer who played as a left winger.

== Career ==
Born in Hungerford, Walker played for Swindon Town, Bradford City, Exeter City and Hereford United.
