= Paul Lee (footballer) =

English footballer

Personal information
- Full name: Paul Andrew Lee
- Date of birth: 30 May 1952 (age 74)
- Place of birth: Oxford, England
- Position: Striker

Senior career*
Years	Team	Apps	(Gls)
- Oxford City
1972–1975	Hereford United	28	(5)
- Chelmsford City

Managerial career
- Abingdon Town
- Abingdon Town
- 1998–2004: Oxford City
- * Club domestic league appearances and goals

Paul Andrew Lee (born 30 May 1952) is an English former professional footballer who played as a striker.

== Career ==
Born in Oxford, Lee played for Oxford City, Hereford United and Chelmsford City. He later managed Abingdon Town in two spells, and in 1998 he became manager of Oxford City, a post he held until 2004.
