= John Ritchie (footballer, born 1951) =

English footballer (born 1951)

Personal information
- Full name: John Ritchie
- Date of birth: 28 February 1951 (age 75)
- Place of birth: Paddington, England
- Position: Forward

Senior career*
| Years | Team | Apps | (Gls) |
- Wealdstone
| 1971–1972 | Slough Town | 16 | (9) |
| 1972–1974 | Arsenal | 0 | (0) |
| 1974 | Hereford United | 22 | (4) |
| 1974–1975 | Enfield | | |
| 1975–1977 | Staines Town | | |
| 1977 | Ilford | | |

International career
| 1972 | England amateurs | 2 | (0) |
- * Club domestic league appearances and goals

John Ritchie (born 28 February 1951) is an English former professional footballer who played as a forward.

== Club career ==
Ritchie began his career at Wealdstone, before signing for Slough Town in 1971. Ritchie scored 20 goals in 32 appearances in all competitions for Slough during the 1971–72 season, before signing for Arsenal alongside teammate Peter Cruse.

In March 1974, after failing to break into the first team at Arsenal, Ritchie signed for Hereford United. During his time at Hereford, Ritchie scored four goals in 22 Football League appearances. On 15 November 1974, following being on the transfer list by Hereford, Ritchie dropped back into non-league, signing for Enfield for a fee of £4,000. In 1975, Ritchie signed for Staines Town, following their promotion to the Isthmian League Premier Division. In 1977, Ritchie signed for Ilford, before being released after four games.

== International career ==
In February 1972, Ritchie made two appearances for England amateurs.
