= Brian Taylor (footballer, born 1949) =

English footballer

Personal information
- Date of birth: 2 July 1949
- Place of birth: Gateshead, England
- Date of death: 31 December 1993 (aged 44)
- Height: 5 ft 10 in (1.78 m)
- Position: Winger

Senior career*
Years	Team	Apps	(Gls)
1970–1971	Coventry City	0	(0)
1971–1978	Walsall	216	(25)
1977–1978	Plymouth Argyle	35	(5)
1979–1982	Preston North End	99	(1)
1982	→ Wigan Athletic (loan)	8	(0)
- * Club domestic league appearances and goals

Brian Taylor (2 July 1949 – December 1993) was an English footballer who played in the Football League for Plymouth Argyle, Preston North End, Walsall and Wigan Athletic.
