= 1976–77 Newport County A.F.C. season =

Welsh association football club season

Newport County
1976–77 season
- Chairman: Richard Ford
- Manager: Jimmy Scoular (until 18 Jan 1977); Colin Addison (after 18 Jan 1977)
- Stadium: Somerton Park
- Fourth Division: 19th
- FA Cup: Second round
- League Cup: First round
- Welsh Cup: Fourth round
- Top goalscorer: League: Woods (12); All: Woods (14)
- Highest home attendance: 8,313 vs Workington (17 May 1977)
- Lowest home attendance: 1,428 vs Darlington (14 January 1977)
- Average home league attendance: 2,611
Home colours	Away colours

The 1976–77 season was Newport County's 15th consecutive season in the Football League Fourth Division and their 49th season overall in the Football League. The season became known as the "Great Escape" as County were entrenched in the re-election places until the last game of the season and would almost certainly have been voted out of the league had they finished there.

== Season review ==
=== Results summary ===
Overall								Home						Away					
Pld	W	D	L	GF	GA	GD	Pts	W	D	L	GF	GA	GD	W	D	L	GF	GA	GD
46	14	10	22	42	58	−16	38	11	6	6	33	21	+12	3	4	16	9	37	−28

Source: rsssf.com

=== Results by round ===
Round	1	2	3	4	5	6	7	8	9	10	11	12	13	14	15	16	17	18	19	20	21	22	23	24	25	26	27	28	29	30	31	32	33	34	35	36	37	38	39	40	41	42	43	44	45	46
Ground	H	A	A	H	A	H	A	H	A	A	H	H	A	A	A	H	A	A	A	H	A	H	A	H	A	H	H	A	H	A	H	H	A	H	A	H	A	A	H	H	A	H	H	H	A	H
Result	L	L	L	D	L	W	W	D	D	L	L	D	D	L	D	D	L	L	L	L	L	D	L	L	L	L	W	L	W	L	W	D	L	W	L	W	W	L	W	L	D	W	W	W	W	W
Position	19	22	23	22	23	21	19	18	19	19	19	20	19	20	21	20	22	22	22	22	23	23	23	23	24	24	23	24	22	23	22	22	22	22	22	22	22	22	22	22	22	21	21	21	21	19

Updated to match(es) played on 17 May 1977. Source: statto.com
A = Away; H = Home; W = Win; D = Draw; L = Loss

== Fixtures and results ==
=== Fourth Division ===
Date	Opponents	Venue	Result	Scorers	Attendance
21 Aug 1976	Stockport County	H	0–1		2,746
23 Aug 1976	Darlington	A	0–1		2,684
28 Aug 1976	Barnsley	A	0–2		4,166
4 Sep 1976	Huddersfield Town	H	1–1	Bell	2,284
10 Sep 1976	Doncaster Rovers	A	0–1		3,739
18 Sep 1976	Aldershot	H	2–1	Clark 2	2,490
25 Sep 1976	Southport	A	1–0	Williams	1,313
2 Oct 1976	Torquay United	H	0–0		2,460
9 Oct 1976	Brentford	A	1–1	Woods	5,890
16 Oct 1976	Bradford City	A	1–3	Jones	5,057
22 Oct 1976	Swansea City	H	0–2		3,416
26 Oct 1976	Hartlepool United	H	1–1	Woods	2,330
29 Oct 1976	Southend United	A	1–1	Villars	4,821
2 Nov 1976	Bournemouth	A	0–1		3,570
13 Nov 1976	Rochdale	A	0–0		2,482
27 Nov 1976	Halifax Town	H	1–1	Woods	2,901
27 Dec 1976	Cambridge United	A	1–3	Woods	4,865
1 Jan 1977	Colchester United	A	0–5		4,614
11 Jan 1977	Watford	A	0–2		4,600
14 Jan 1977	Darlington	H	0–1		1,428
21 Jan 1977	Stockport County	A	1–2	Bell	3,450
28 Jan 1977	Scunthorpe United	H	0–0		1,601
12 Feb 1977	Huddersfield Town	A	0–3		5,452
22 Feb 1977	Colchester United	H	1–2	Emmanuel	1,575
26 Feb 1977	Aldershot	A	0–4		3,285
1 Mar 1977	Doncaster Rovers	H	1–2	Parsons	1,714
4 Mar 1977	Southport	H	3–1	Parsons 2, Bruton	1,569
12 Mar 1977	Torquay United	A	0–1		3,283
18 Mar 1977	Brentford	H	3–1	Relish, Clark, White	1,737
23 Mar 1977	Crewe Alexandra	A	0–2		2,110
26 Mar 1977	Bradford City	H	2–0	Clark, Woods	2,096
28 Mar 1977	Barnsley	H	1–1	Walker	2,319
2 Apr 1977	Swansea City	A	1–3	Relish	3,577
5 Apr 1977	Cambridge United	H	4–2	Clark 3, Relish	2,306
9 Apr 1977	Exeter City	A	0–1		5,243
12 Apr 1977	Bournemouth	H	1–0	Preece	2,962
16 Apr 1977	Hartlepool United	A	1–0	Woods	1,507
19 Apr 1977	Scunthorpe United	A	0–1		1,883
23 Apr 1977	Rochdale	H	3–0	Woods 3	2,206
26 Apr 1977	Exeter City	H	0–3		3,550
30 Apr 1977	Halifax Town	A	0–0		1,299
3 May 1977	Watford	H	3–0	Clark, Preece, Woods	2,218
7 May 1977	Crewe Alexandra	H	2–1	Woods, OG	2,484
10 May 1977	Southend United	H	3–0	Preece 2, Relish	3,356
14 May 1977	Workington	A	1–0	Preece	1,285
17 May 1977	Workington	H	1–0	Woods	8,313

=== FA Cup ===
Round	Date	Opponents	Venue	Result	Scorers	Attendance
1	20 Nov 1976	Bournemouth	A	0–0		4,801
1r	23 Nov 1976	Bournemouth	H	3–0	Parsons 2, Woods	3,807
2	11 Dec 1976	Southend United	A	0–3		5,724

=== Football League Cup ===
Round	Date	Opponents	Venue	Result	Scorers	Attendance	Notes
1–1	14 Aug 1976	Swansea City	A	1–4	Woods	3,281	
1–2	17 Aug 1976	Swansea City	H	1–0	Bell	2,692	2–4 agg

=== Welsh Cup ===
Round	Date	Opponents	Venue	Result	Scorers	Attendance
4	18 Jan 1977	Swansea City	H	1–4	Parsons	3,755

== League table ==
Pos	Team	Pld	W	D	L	GF	GA	GD	Pts	Promotion or relegation
17	Aldershot	46	16	11	19	49	59	−10	43	
18	Rochdale	46	13	12	21	50	59	−9	38	
19	Newport County	46	14	10	22	42	58	−16	38	
20	Scunthorpe United	46	13	11	22	49	73	−24	37	
21	Halifax Town	46	11	14	21	47	58	−11	36	Re-elected
