= John Charles (footballer, born 1944) =

English footballer

Personal information
- Full name: John William Charles
- Date of birth: 20 September 1944
- Place of birth: Canning Town, London, England
- Date of death: 17 August 2002 (aged 57)
- Position: Full-back

Senior career*
Years	Team	Apps	(Gls)
1962–1971	West Ham United	118	(1)
- * Club domestic league appearances and goals

John William Charles (9 September 1944 – 17 August 2002) was an English footballer who played for West Ham United as a defender. Nicknamed ″Charlo″, Charles was the first black player to represent England at Under-18 and any level within the National team. Charles was the first black player to play for a first division West Ham United side when he made his debut in 1963.

== Early life ==
Charles was born in Ordnance Road, Canning Town. The family later moved to Ronald Avenue and he attended Pretoria School. He was the second youngest of nine children. His younger brother Clive also played for West Ham and went on to coach the US National Soccer Team. His mother, who was white, came from Silvertown and his father was a merchant seaman from Grenada.

== Football career ==
Playing for local side, West Ham boys, Charles was spotted by former West Ham United goalkeeper and scout, Ernie Gregory who recommended him to chief scout Wally St Pier. Charles signed as a youth player in 1959 and signed professionally, aged 17 in 1963. He captained West Ham's Youth Cup winning side of 1963; the first black player to lead a first-class side to a major trophy. Charles made his debut for the first team in May 1963 against Blackburn Rovers. Injury prevented Charles from being part of the West Ham teams which won the 1964 FA Cup final and the 1965 European Cup Winners' Cup final. Nevertheless, playing most of his games alongside Bobby Moore, he made 142 appearances for West Ham in all competitions scoring two goals; one a League Cup game against Grimsby Town, the other the single West Ham goal in a famous Manchester United 6–1 victory at Upton Park in which Manchester United won the 1966–67 Football League trophy. From the autumn of 1969 until spring 1970 injury restricted Charles to only five games. He left West Ham in the summer of 1971. He was offered a move to Orient then managed by former West Ham player, Jimmy Bloomfield, but because of a recurring hamstring problem he retired from football aged only 26 to run the family's market greengrocer's stall.

== Illness and death ==
Charles admitted to being part of a strong drinking culture which existed at West Ham in the 1960s which gave rise to their slogan ″Win, Draw or Lose, we're on the booze″. By his own admission he was a borderline alcoholic when he finished playing football. However at the end of his footballing career his business prospects looked good; Charles earned £65 per week as a footballer with West Ham but on his first week on the greengrocer's stall he earned £200 and he opened several grocer's stalls in Kent. In the 1990s, as people started to use major supermarkets more and more his business began to fail. Charles drifted into alcoholism and had mental health problems. In 2001, he was diagnosed with cancer and died on 17 August 2002 aged 57.

Football is surely indebted to him as he undoubtedly paved the way for his black brothers who now enjoy the fame, riches and adulation, which he most certainly helped make possible.

— Brian Dear at his funeral

He was survived by his wife, Carol and his three children, sons Keith and Butch and his daughter, Lesley.
