= Jackie Dryden =

English footballer (1919–2004)

Personal information
- Full name: John George Dryden
- Date of birth: 16 September 1919
- Place of birth: Sunderland, England
- Date of death: 3 April 2004 (aged 84)
- Place of death: Eastbourne, England
- Position: Outside right

Youth career
- St Mary's Juniors

Senior career*
| Years | Team | Apps | (Gls) |
| –1938 | Washington Chemicals | 0 | (0) |
| 1938–1946 | Charlton Athletic | 0 | (0) |
| 1946–1947 | Hylton Colliery Welfare | | |
| 1947–1948 | Swindon Town | 21 | (3) |
| 1948–1950 | Leyton Orient | 40 | (10) |
| 1950– | Tonbridge | | |
| –1952 | Snowdown Colliery Welfare | | |
| 1952–1953 | Margate | | |
- Sittingbourne
- * Club domestic league appearances and goals

John George Dryden (16 September 1919 – 3 April 2004) was an English professional footballer who played in the Football League for Leyton Orient and Swindon Town as an outside right. He later scouted for Burnley.

== Personal life ==
Dryden served in the British Armed Forces during the Second World War.

== Career statistics ==
Appearances and goals by club, season and competition
| Club | Season | League | | | FA Cup | | Total | |
| Club | Season | Division | Apps | Goals | Apps | Goals | Apps | Goals |
|---|---|---|---|---|---|---|---|---|
| Swindon Town | 1947–48 | Third Division South | 21 | 3 | 6 | 2 | 27 | 5 |
| Career total | | | 21 | 3 | 6 | 2 | 27 | 5 |
