= Derek Forster =

English footballer (1949–2024)

Personal information
- Date of birth: 19 February 1949
- Place of birth: Newcastle upon Tyne, England
- Date of death: 2 May 2024 (aged 75)
- Height: 5 ft 9 in (1.75 m)
- Position: Goalkeeper

Senior career*
Years	Team	Apps	(Gls)
1964–1972	Sunderland	18	(0)
1967	Vancouver Royals	7	(0)
1973–1974	Charlton Athletic	9	(0)
1974–1976	Brighton & Hove Albion	3	(0)
Total		37	(0)
- * Club domestic league appearances and goals

Derek Forster (19 February 1949 – 2 May 2024) was an English footballer who played as a goalkeeper. He started his career at Manor Park School in Newcastle upon Tyne, and during his time at Manor Park he also played for the England school team. He then moved to Sunderland as a youth player, where he would progress to become their youngest ever player to make a first team appearance. Forster moved up into the senior side, but suffered limited appearances due to the presence of Jimmy Montgomery. He left Sunderland in 1972 to join Charlton Athletic before moving again to Brighton & Hove Albion where he finished his career.

== Career ==
Born in Newcastle upon Tyne, Forster started his footballing career during his time at Manor Park School, in the Newcastle Schools Youth Team. From here, he went on to make five appearances for England schools. In 1964 he signed for Sunderland as a youth apprentice, where he would become an understudy of record appearance holder Jimmy Montgomery. While still in the youth side of the club, Forster was called up to the first team due to an injury to Montgomery, and started a game against Leicester City on 22 August 1964. At 15 years 185 days old, he became the First Division's youngest ever player, as well as Sunderland's. He held the record for youngest debutant in England's top division until Ethan Nwaneri made his debut for Arsenal in 2022. Forster signed his professional contract at the club in February 1966. He made just 18 league appearances in his Sunderland career, spanning from 1964 to 1972, with Montgomery staying the first choice for the team until 1977. At 5 foot 9 inches, he was significantly shorter than most goalkeepers in the top flight.

Forster joined Charlton Athletic in July 1973, but again was left regularly unused, making just nine appearances in his solitary season at the club. He made the last move of his career in 1974 when he joined Brighton & Hove Albion where he made three appearances, later becoming an amateur player in the Wearside Football League.

== Later life and death ==
After football, Forster became assistant manager of Washington Leisure Centre in County Durham.

He died on 2 May 2024, at the age of 75.
