= Brian Evans (footballer) =

Welsh footballer

Personal information
- Full name: Brian Clifford Evans
- Date of birth: 2 December 1942
- Place of birth: Brynmawr, Wales
- Date of death: 26 February 2003 (aged 60)
- Place of death: Swansea, Wales
- Height: 5 ft 8 in (1.73 m)
- Position: Winger

Senior career*
Years	Team	Apps	(Gls)
1960–1963	Abergavenny Thursdays		
1963–1973	Swansea City	356	(58)
1973–1975	Hereford United	48	(9)
1975–1976	Bath City	52	(10)
1976–1977	Llanelli		
1977–1978	Haverfordwest County		
1978–1979	Pontardawe Town		

International career
1971–1973	Wales	7	(0)
- * Club domestic league appearances and goals

Brian Clifford Evans (2 December 1942 – 26 February 2003) was a Welsh footballer who played as a winger in the Football League for Swansea City and Hereford United. He made a total of 397 senior appearances for Swansea (excluding Welsh Cup appearances), and was capped 7 times for Wales. Brian Evans was the father of former footballer Richard Evans.

== Career ==
After being spotted playing for Abergavenny Thursdays, Evans joined Swansea City in July 1963 for a fee of £650. Over the following decade Evans helped the side win the Welsh Cup in 1966 and promotion to Division Three during the 1969–70 season. In August 1973, he was sold to Hereford United for £7,000 as manager Harry Gregg was forced to sell several players before he was allowed to sign new players. After leaving Hereford in 1975, Evans moved into non-league football with spells at Bath City, Llanelli, Haverfordwest County and Pontardawe Town.

== International career ==
Evans played for the Wales under-23 side and was also part of an FAW XI tour of Tahiti, New Zealand, Australia and Malaysia in 1971. He made his debut for the senior side on 13 October 1971 in a 3–0 win over Finland. He went on to make a further six appearances over the following two years, winning his final cap on 26 September 1973 in a 3–0 defeat to Poland.

== Later life ==
After retiring from playing he ran a painting and decoration business in Swansea. He died at the age of 60 after a short battle with cancer.
