= Richard Evans (footballer, born 1968) =

Welsh footballer

Personal information
- Full name: Richard William Evans
- Date of birth: 12 April 1968 (age 58)
- Place of birth: Ebbw Vale, Wales
- Position: Winger

Youth career
- Cardiff City

Senior career*
Years	Team	Apps	(Gls)
1985	Cardiff City	0	(0)
- Weymouth
- Newport County
1991–94	Bristol Rovers	15	(2)
1992–93	→ Exeter City (loan)	5	(2)
1994–95	Yeovil Town	35	
- * Club domestic league appearances and goals

Richard William Evans (born 12 April 1968) is a Welsh former professional footballer, who played as a winger. He is a member of the backroom staff with the Portugal national team. He previously played for several football clubs, including Cardiff City, Exeter City and Bristol Rovers. Evans is the son of former Swansea City and Wales international footballer Brian Evans.

== Career ==
After retiring from playing professional football, Evans studied towards a Sports science BSc (Hons) at Loughborough University (1997–1999), and later a Physiotherapy BSc Hons at Brunel University (2002–2006).

Speaking to the BBC Wales, he said: "I pursued a career in football after leaving school. When I got to the age of 27 and had played professional and semi-professional football I realised that football wasn't going to provide me with a living after I'd finished my days really. "So whilst I was playing at Lilleshall I did a treatment and management of injuries course held by the FA, and that's what instilled an interest in physiotherapy."

Prior to his appointment at Everton, he has held the position of Head Physiotherapist at Swansea City (1999–2009) and also Head of Sport Science at Wigan Athletic (2009–2013). In 2013, he was appointed Head of Performance at Everton. In August 2016, he joined the backroom staff of the Belgium national football team.
