= Willie Mailey =

Scottish footballer (1943–1992)

Personal information
- Date of birth: 13 June 1943
- Place of birth: Duntocher, Scotland
- Date of death: 22 June 1992 (aged 49)
- Position: Goalkeeper

Senior career*
Years	Team	Apps	(Gls)
1960–1963	Everton	1	(0)
1963–1970	Crewe Alexandra	216	(0)
- Altrincham
1972–1976	Macclesfield Town	161	(0)
1976–??	Winsford United		
- Whitchurch Alport
Total		377	(0)
- * Club domestic league appearances and goals

Willie Mailey (13 June 1943 – 22 June 1992) was a Scottish professional football goalkeeper who played for Everton, Crewe Alexandra and Altrincham.

== Honours ==
with Crewe Alexandra

- Football League Fourth Division fourth-place promotion: 1967–68
