= George Watkin =

English footballer

Personal information
- Date of birth: 14 April 1944 (age 82)
- Place of birth: Chopwell, England
- Position: Forward

Senior career*
Years	Team	Apps	(Gls)
1962–1963	Newcastle United	1	(0)
1963–1964	King's Lynn		
1964–1965	Chesterfield	7	(1)
- Gateshead
Total		8	(1)
- * Club domestic league appearances and goals

George Watkin (born 14 April 1944) is an English former professional footballer who played in the Football League as a forward.
