= Ricky Evans (rugby union) =

Wales international rugby union footballer

- Born: Richard Lloyd Evans; 23 June 1960 (age 66) Aberporth, Wales
- Height: 6 ft 2 in (1.88 m)
- Weight: 243 lb (17 st 5 lb; 110 kg)

Rugby union career
- Position: Prop
Senior career
Years	Team	Apps	(Points)
1987–1997	Llanelli	213	(123)
International career
Years	Team	Apps	(Points)
1993-1995	Wales	19	(0)

Richard Lloyd Evans (born 23 June 1960) is a Welsh former rugby union player.

== History ==
Born in Aberporth Cardigan in West Wales in 1960, Evans played most of his club rugby for Llanelli RFC, playing in the side that beat a touring Australia, who were then world champions. He was capped 19 times by Wales, playing at loosehead prop.

His debut was against England at Cardiff Arms Park in 1993, a game Wales won 10-9. In 1994, he was part of the Wales team that won the Five Nations, despite a final-day loss to England at Twickenham. Evans was denied an almost-certain try during the game, but a tap tackle by Dewi Morris prevented him; however, Evans was able to the ball and make it available for Nigel Walker to score in the corner, reducing the points difference and securing the title for Wales.

Despite a serious ankle injury sustained in the Five Nations match against France in Paris in January 1995, Evans recovered and went on to play in the 1995 World Cup against New Zealand and Ireland.

History was made in the French courts when Evans sued Olivier Merle the French lock who had caused the injury through foul play. For the first time, video evidence of the game was accepted in a French court. The match had been taped by Evans' father and proved to be the turning point in the trial.

Injury cut short what was a promising career at international level which may well have resulted in selection for the British & Irish Lions 1997 squad to tour South Africa.

Evans finished his playing career with Cardigan RFC.

== Personal life ==
Evans is a convert to Buddhism.
