= Colin Tavener =

English footballer and manager

Personal information
- Date of birth: 26 June 1945 (age 79)

Senior career*
| Years | Team | Apps | (Gls) |
| 1963 | Bath City | | |
- Trowbridge
- Hereford Utd
| 1974– | Bath City | | |
| 1981– | Salisbury | | |
- *Club domestic league appearances and goals

Colin Tavener (born 26 June 1945) is an English former professional footballer who played as a midfielder.

Tavener began his career with Bath City, but was released by Bath manager Malcolm Allison without making his debut. He later played for Trowbridge Town and in the Football League for Hereford United.

Released by Hereford, he rejoined Bath City in July 1974, making over 300 appearances and a spell as caretaker manager in 1980, before leaving to join Salisbury in February 1981. He returned to Bath in June 1981 as player reserve team manager and became assistant manager under Bobby Jones. He was caretaker manager on two more occasions before leaving Bath in November 1988.
