= Eric Redrobe =

English footballer (1944–2025)

Personal information
- Date of birth: 23 August 1944
- Place of birth: Wigan, England
- Date of death: 31 December 2025 (aged 81)
- Position: Striker

Youth career
- Bolton Wanderers

Senior career*
Years	Team	Apps	(Gls)
1962–1966	Bolton Wanderers	4	(1)
1966–1972	Southport	192	(55)
1972–1976	Hereford United	86	(17)
1976–1977	Bath City	28	(7)
1977–1978	Hereford United	1	(0)
- Lydbrook Athletic
- * Club domestic league appearances and goals

Eric Redrobe (23 August 1944 – 31 December 2025) was an English association footballer who played in the Football League as a striker for Bolton Wanderers, Southport and Hereford United during the 1960s and 1970s.

== Career ==
Redrobe played rugby league for Lancashire Schoolboys, and received contract offers in that sport, but chose to play association football instead. His style was bustling and often physical, although he was not a particularly big man, with a height of about 6 ft 1 in (1.85 m). He exhibited excellent ball control.

An England youth international, he started his career at Bolton Wanderers making four appearances and scoring one goal in two and a half seasons. He had a trial at Colchester United before joining Southport in 1966. In his first season, he scored the winning goal in Southport's last away game, then, needing to win their last home game to secure promotion from the Fourth Division, he set up the only goal of the game for George Andrews. Called 'Big Eric' or 'Big Red' by Southport fans, Redrobe was a regular in the side during its three seasons in the Third Division before relegation.

After another three seasons in the Fourth Division, he was sold for a fee of £6,000 to Hereford United, newly elected to the Football League, in October 1972; he scored nine goals as the Bulls were promoted at their first attempt. He remained at Edgar Street until the end of Hereford's successful 1975–76 season when they won the Third Division. He dropped into non-league football to play for Bath City before a brief return to Hereford in 1977.

Redrobe later became a bailiff.

In 2007, he was chosen as the Southport fans' all-time favourite player as part of the Professional Footballers' Association centenary celebrations.

== Death ==
Redrobe died on 31 December 2025, at the age of 81.
