= Bobby Park (footballer, born 1952) =

Scottish footballer

Personal information
- Date of birth: 5 January 1952 (age 74)
- Place of birth: Glasgow, Scotland
- Height: 5 ft 10 in (1.78 m)
- Position: Midfielder

Senior career*
Years	Team	Apps	(Gls)
1969–1972	Sunderland	64	(4)
- * Club domestic league appearances and goals

Robert Park, Jr (born 5 January 1952) is a Scottish former footballer. Though he was a promising young midfielder playing for Sunderland at age 17, his short career was subsequently plagued with serious injuries.

== Playing career ==
Park began his footballing career with Sunderland in 1962. Park was a promising midfielder, reaching the first team squad at the young age of 17. However, Park's career was repeatedly punctuated with serious injuries. His career lasted a brief seven years, during which time he suffered from broken leg injuries three times.

During his playing career, Park scored a crucial penalty against Tyne and Wear rivals Newcastle United in front of a 51,950 crowd in the 1969–70 season, in which the game concluded in a 1–1 draw result.

Park was planning to play his debut international cap for Scotland before he broke his leg for the second time.

== Later career ==
Park retired from football and first opened a discount household goods store.

For a brief period in later life Park was a journalist writing freelance sporting articles for local newspapers in Hexham. Park wrote about certain football teams, such as Carlisle United and Sunderland. He also wrote about golf, one of his personal interests.

== Personal life ==
Park's father Robert Park, Sr was also a footballer and played as a goalkeeper for Queen of the South F.C. & Hull City A.F.C.

Bobby is an active member of his local community in Cleadon Village.
