= Micky Boot =

English footballer

Personal information
- Full name: Michael Colin Boot
- Date of birth: 17 December 1947 (age 78)
- Place of birth: Leicester, England
- Position: Midfielder

Youth career
- 1963–1966: Arsenal

Senior career*
Years	Team	Apps	(Gls)
1966–1967	Arsenal	4	(2)
1967–1968	Port Elizabeth City		
1968–1971	Nuneaton Borough		
1971–1972	Kidderminster Harriers		
1972–197?	AP Leamington		
- Townsville
- Mareeba
- Phoenix
- * Club domestic league appearances and goals

Michael Colin Boot (born 17 December 1947) is an English former professional footballer who played as a midfielder.

== Career ==
Boot joined Arsenal in 1963, turned professional in December 1964, and made his senior debut in October 1966. Boot made his debut on 5 October 1966 in a league cup defeat to West Ham United. Boot's first goal for Arsenal came only three days later against Newcastle United in a 2-0 league victory at Highbury. Boot's final appearance in an Arsenal shirt occurred on 5 November 1966 when he replaced Jon Sammels during Arsenal's 1–0 defeat against Leeds United at Highbury. Over the course of the season, Boot scored 2 goals in 4 appearances in the Football League.

After a spell in South Africa with Port Elizabeth City, where he helped the club win the National Football League title, Boot played English non-league football with Nuneaton Borough of the Southern Football League Premier Division, Kidderminster Harriers of the West Midlands (Regional) League, and AP Leamington, where he was ever-present as the team were promoted to the Southern League Premier Division in 1975–76. He later moved to Australia, where he played for Townsville, Mareeba and Phoenix before taking up coaching.
