= Mick McLaughlin =

Welsh footballer

Personal information
- Full name: Michael Anthony McLaughlin
- Date of birth: 5 January 1943
- Place of birth: Newport, Wales
- Date of death: 6 December 2015 (aged 72)
- Place of death: Newport, Wales
- Position: Central defender

Youth career
- 1959–1961: Newport County

Senior career*
Years	Team	Apps	(Gls)
195?–1959	Nash United		
1959–1963	Newport County		
1963–	Merthyr Tydfil		
- Barry Town
–1968	Lovell's Athletic		
1968–1970	Newport County	90	(2)
1970–1975	Hereford United		
1975–1976	Cheltenham Town		
1976–1977	Newport County	7	(0)
- * Club domestic league appearances and goals

Michael Anthony McLaughlin (5 January 1943 – 6 December 2015) was a Welsh footballer who played as a central defender for Nash United, Newport County, Lovell's Athletic, Hereford United and Cheltenham Town. McLaughlin was part of the Hereford United team that famously beat Newcastle United in the FA Cup in 1972.
