= Alan Jones (footballer, born 1945) =

Welsh footballer (1945–2023)

Personal information
- Date of birth: 6 October 1945
- Place of birth: Swansea, Wales
- Date of death: 11 March 2023 (aged 77)
- Place of death: Swansea, Wales
- Position: Central defender

Senior career*
Years	Team	Apps	(Gls)
1964–1968	Swansea City	59	(5)
1967–1974	Hereford United	335	(25)
1974–1976	Southport	49	(2)
1975	→ Los Angeles Aztecs (loan)	20	(0)
Total		363	(32)
- * Club domestic league appearances and goals

Alan Jones (6 October 1945 – 11 March 2023) was a Welsh footballer who played as a central defender during the 1960s and 1970s.

Jones started his career at hometown club Swansea City, then known as Swansea Town, and turned professional in October 1963. He went on to make 61 league appearances, scoring 6 goals, before joining Hereford United in 1968. He spent six seasons at Edgar Street and was a member of the team that famously knocked Newcastle United out of the FA Cup and gained election to the English Football League in the same season.

Jones later played for Southport, in the United States for Los Angeles Aztecs and latterly in the Welsh leagues, where he played for Ammanford and Haverfordwest County.

After retiring from football, he became a prison officer. Jones died on 11 March 2023, at the age of 77.

== Sources ==
- "The Hereford United Story" (1974) by John Williamson
