= Harry Gregory (footballer, born 1943) =

English footballer

Personal information
- Full name: Gordon Harry Gregory
- Date of birth: 23 October 1943
- Place of birth: Hackney, London, England
- Date of death: 6 June 2016 (aged 72)
- Place of death: Chelmsford, England
- Position: Midfielder

Senior career*
Years	Team	Apps	(Gls)
1962–1966	Orient	79	(12)
1966–1971	Charlton Athletic	149	(24)
1971–1972	Aston Villa	24	(2)
1972–1975	Hereford United	73	(6)
1975–1976	Chelmsford City	23	(3)
Total		348	(47)
- * Club domestic league appearances and goals

Gordon Harry Gregory (24 October 1943 – 6 June 2016) was an English footballer who played as a midfielder in the Football League.

Gregory died on 6 June 2016, aged 72.

== Personal life ==
Gregory's grandson, Reggie, currently plays for Chelmsford City.
