= Colin Addison =

English football player and manager (1940–2025)

Personal information
- Date of birth: 18 May 1940
- Place of birth: Taunton, England
- Date of death: 31 October 2025 (aged 85)
- Place of death: Hereford, England
- Height: 5 ft 11 in (1.80 m)
- Positions: Forward; midfielder

Senior career*
Years	Team	Apps	(Gls)
1957–1961	York City	87	(28)
1961–1966	Nottingham Forest	160	(62)
1966–1967	Arsenal	28	(9)
1967–1971	Sheffield United	94	(22)
1971–1973	Hereford United	44	(6)
Total		413	(127)

Managerial career
- 1971–1974: Hereford United (player-manager)
- 1975–1976: Durban City
- 1976–1977: Notts County (assistant)
- 1977–1978: Newport County
- 1979: West Bromwich Albion (assistant)
- 1979–1982: Derby County
- 1982–1985: Newport County
- 1985–1986: Al-Ahli (Doha)
- 1986–1987: Celta Vigo
- 1987–1988: West Bromwich Albion (assistant)
- 1988–1989: Atlético Madrid
- 1990: Cádiz
- 1990–1991: Hereford United
- 1992–1993: Al-Arabi Kuwait
- 1993–1994: Cádiz
- 1995–1996: Badajoz
- 1996–1998: Merthyr Tydfil
- 1999–2000: Scarborough
- 2000–2001: Yeovil Town
- 2001–2002: Swansea City
- 2002–2003: Forest Green Rovers
- 2004: Barry Town
- * Club domestic league appearances and goals

Colin Addison (18 May 1940 – 31 October 2025) was an English professional football player and manager.

Addison was born in Taunton, Somerset. He started his playing career with York City before moving to Nottingham Forest, Arsenal and Sheffield United. His managerial career started when he took the post of player-manager of Hereford United in 1971 during their famous 1971–72 FA Cup run, which saw them defeat Newcastle United.

Later, Addison managed a wide variety of clubs in the UK, as well as in Spain, South Africa, Kuwait and Qatar.

== Playing career ==
Addison was born in Taunton but brought up in York. He joined York City as an amateur and turned professional in May 1957.

In his second season, he scored 10 league goals helping York win promotion to the recently created Third Division, and midway through the 1960–61 season he was transferred to First Division side Nottingham Forest for £12,000, a then-record fee for City.

Addison was a regular at the City Ground scoring 62 goals in 160 league appearances, before being signed by Bertie Mee's Arsenal in 1966 for £45,000. His time at Highbury was hampered by injury and, after scoring an average of one goal in every three games for the Gunners, he was sold to First Division side Sheffield United at the end of the 1967 season.

Addison joined United on the recommendation of assistant manager Andy Beattie who he had played with whilst at Nottingham Forest, signing for £40,000. Signed as a centre forward and to provide goals, he remained a first-team regular until the 1971 season, when he opted to move into management, joining leading non-league side Hereford United as player-manager.

== Managerial career ==
=== Player-manager ===
Addison arrived at Hereford United in October 1971, succeeding the legendary John Charles as player-manager. He inherited a strong group of players which he led through the club's famous giant-killing FA Cup run and ultimately election to the Football League.

In the Second Round, Addison and his team needed two replays to get past Northampton Town but it was worth the effort as a trip to top-flight Newcastle United awaited. After going 2–1 down in the tie, it was Addison who hit the 25-yard equaliser to take the Magpies to the return fixture at Edgar Street.

In front of a capacity crowd and on a quagmire of a pitch, Addison and Hereford won 2–1 after extra time with Radford and George scoring. They went on to take West Ham United to another replay in the Fourth Round before eventually losing 3–1 at Boleyn Ground.

Hereford were elected to the Football League at the end of Addison's first season as a manager, and the success continued the following season when Hereford finished as runners-up in Division Four.

=== Management ===
Addison carried on playing until November 1973, but with a broken leg, he proceeded as manager until 1974 when he left to manage South African side Durban City F.C.

He returned to England in December 1975, joining Notts County as assistant to Ronnie Fenton. His next managerial position was at Newport County achieving the 'Great Escape' of the 1976–77 season before he returned to West Bromwich Albion as assistant manager to Ron Atkinson.

After two seasons in charge at Derby County, Addison departed in 1982, returning to Newport County where he led the team to their highest post-war league finish in the 1982–83 season. In May 1985 Addison moved to Qatar to guide Al-Ahli to second position in the Qatari league. Subsequently, Addison took Celta Vigo into 'La Liga' First Division in his first season in charge.

A second spell at West Bromwich Albion as assistant manager to Ron Atkinson followed, before he and Atkinson departed for Atlético Madrid in October 1988. However, Atkinson left after only two months, with Addison taking over the leadership of the club. Addison departed Atlético Madrid leaving the capital's side fifth in La Liga, moving to Cádiz CF, where he garnered a string of victories to ensure Cadiz's position in the First Division. Addison then moved to Kuwait where he won the league with Al-Arabi, finishing above the second-placed team managed by Felipe Scolari. Returning to the UK, Addison once again took up the reins at Hereford United.

Later management roles included Yeovil Town, Swansea City and the Conference National side Forest Green Rovers, leading the club to their highest league finish at the time. He was manager of Scarborough in the 1998–99 season, when goalkeeper Jimmy Glass scored a memorable goal for Carlisle United that changed the course of the season in the dying minutes, subsequently relegating Scarborough.

== Radio career ==
Addison was a pundit on BBC Radio Wales until 2008.

== Personal life and death ==
Addison resided in the city of Hereford. His death there at the age of 85 was announced on 31 October 2025.

== Honours ==
- Football Conference Manager of the Month: February 2003
- A road, Addison Court, near the football ground in Hereford, is named in his honour.
