= 2024–25 in English football =

Football in England
- Season: 2024–25

Men's football
- Premier League: Liverpool
- Championship: Leeds United
- League One: Birmingham City
- League Two: Doncaster Rovers
- National League: Barnet
- FA Cup: Crystal Palace
- EFL Trophy: Peterborough United
- EFL Cup: Newcastle United
- Community Shield: Manchester City

Women's football
- Women's Super League: Chelsea
- Women's Championship: London City Lionesses
- FA Women's National League Northern Premier Division: Nottingham Forest
- FA Women's National League Southern Premier Division: Ipswich Town
- Women's FA Cup: Chelsea
- Women's League Cup: Chelsea

The 2024–25 season was the 145th competitive association football season in England.

== National teams ==
=== England men's national football team ===
==== Results and fixtures ====
===== Friendlies =====
10 June 2025 Friendly	England	1–3	Senegal	Nottingham, England
19:45 UTC+1	Kane 7'; Colwill (yellow card) 30'; Walker (yellow card) 44'	Report	Diatta (yellow card) 17'; Sarr 40'; Diarra 62'; Sabaly 90+3'	Stadium: City Ground; Attendance: 26,350; Referee: Stéphanie Frappart (France)

===== UEFA Euro 2024 =====
====== Knockout stage ======
6 July 2024 UEFA Euro 2024 Quarter-final	England	1–1 (a.e.t.) (5–3 p)	Switzerland	Düsseldorf, Germany
18:00 CEST (UTC+2)	Kane (yellow card) 67'; Saka 80'	Report	Schär (yellow card) 32'; Embolo 75'; Widmer (yellow card) 85'	Stadium: Merkur Spiel-Arena; Attendance: 46,907; Referee: Daniele Orsato (Italy)
	Penalties
	Palmer (penalty scored); Bellingham (penalty scored); Saka (penalty scored); Toney (penalty scored); Alexander-Arnold (penalty scored)		(penalty missed) Akanji; (penalty scored) Schär; (penalty scored) Shaqiri; (penalty scored) Amdouni

10 July 2024 UEFA Euro 2024 Semi-finals	Netherlands	1–2	England	Dortmund
21:00	Simons 7' (yellow card) 90+1'; Dumfries (yellow card) 17'; van Dijk (yellow card) 87'	Report	Kane 18' (pen.); Bellingham (yellow card) 72'; Saka (yellow card) 86'; Watkins 90'; Trippier (yellow card) 90+4'	Stadium: Westfalenstadion; Attendance: 60,926; Referee: Felix Zwayer (Germany)

Final

14 July 2024
21:00

Spain	2–1	England
Williams 47'; Oyarzabal 86'	Report	Palmer 73'

Olympiastadion, Berlin
Attendance: 65,600
Referee: François Letexier (France)

===== 2024–25 Nations League =====
====== Group B2 ======
Pos	Team	Pld	W	D	L	GF	GA	GD	Pts	Promotion, qualification or relegation	(England)	(Greece)	(Republic of Ireland)	(Finland)
1	England (P)	6	5	0	1	16	3	+13	15 (Note: Tied on head to head points. Head-to-head goal difference: England +2, Greece −2.)	Promotion to League A	—	1–2	5–0	2–0
2	Greece (O, P)	6	5	0	1	11	4	+7	15	Qualification for promotion play-offs	0–3	—	2–0	3–0
3	Republic of Ireland (O)	6	2	0	4	3	12	−9	6	Qualification for relegation play-offs	0–2	0–2	—	1–0
4	Finland (R)	6	0	0	6	2	13	−11	0	Relegation to League C	1–3	0–2	1–2	—

Source: UEFA
(O) Play-off winners; (P) Promoted; (R) Relegated
Notes:

7 September 2024	Republic of Ireland	0–2	England	Dublin, Ireland
17:00	Szmodics (yellow card) 44'; Molumby (yellow card) 64'; Brady (yellow card) 68'; O'Brien (yellow card) 76'		Rice 11'; Mainoo (yellow card) 13'; Grealish 26'; Colwill (yellow card) 76'	Stadium: Aviva Stadium; Attendance: 55,359; Referee: José María Sánchez Martínez (Spain)

10 September 2024	England	2–0	Finland	London, England
19:45	Kane 57', 76'		Schüller (yellow card) 66'	Stadium: Wembley Stadium; Attendance: 70221; Referee: Morten Krogh (Denmark)

10 October 2024	England	1–2	Greece	London, England
19:45	Saka (yellow card) 45'; Rice (yellow card) 53'; Bellingham 87'		Koulierakis (yellow card) 6'; Pavlidis 49', 90+4' (yel), 90+1'; Kourbelis (yellow card) 71'; Pelkas (yellow card) 90+2'	Stadium: Wembley Stadium; Attendance: 79012; Referee: Andrea Colombo (Italy)

13 October 2024	Finland	1–3	England	Helsinki, Finland
17:01	Joskonen 87'		Grealish 18'; Alexander-Arnold 74'; Rice 84'	Stadium: Helsinki Olympic Stadium; Attendance: 32441; Referee: Giorgi Kruashvili (Georgia)

14 November 2024	Greece	0–3	England	Athens, Greece
19:45	Bakasetas (yellow card) 22'; Zaferis (yellow card) 62'		Watkins 7'; Bellingham (yellow card) 10'; Gallagher (yellow card) 11'; Pickford (yellow card) 27'; Vlachodimos 77' (o.g.); Jones 83'	Stadium: Athens Olympic Stadium; Attendance: 60664; Referee: Daniel Siebert (Germany)

17 November 2024	England	5–0	Republic of Ireland	London, England
17:00	Bellingham (yellow card) 41'; Madueke (yellow card) 41'; Kane (yellow card) 45+3', (goal) 53' (pen.); Gordon 55'; Gallagher 58'; Bowen 76'; Harwood Bellis 79'; Gomes (yellow card) 89'		Scales (yellow card) 43' (yellow-red card) 51'; Molumby (yellow card) 45+3'; O'Shea (yellow card) 85'	Stadium: Wembley Stadium; Attendance: 79969; Referee: Erik Lambrechts (Belgium)

==== 2026 FIFA World Cup qualification ====
===== Group K =====
Pos	Team	Pld	W	D	L	GF	GA	GD	Pts	Qualification	(England national football team)	(Albania national football team)	(Serbia national football team)	(Latvia national football team)	(Andorra national football team)
1	England	8	8	0	0	22	0	+22	24	Qualification for 2026 FIFA World Cup	—	2–0	2–0	3–0	2–0
2	Albania	8	4	2	2	7	5	+2	14	Advance to play-offs	0–2	—	0–0	1–0	3–0
3	Serbia	8	4	1	3	9	10	−1	13		0–5	0–1	—	2–1	3–0
4	Latvia	8	1	2	5	5	15	−10	5		0–5	1–1	0–1	—	2–2
5	Andorra	8	0	1	7	3	16	−13	1		0–1	0–1	1–3	0–1	—

Source: FIFA, UEFA

21 March 2025	England	2–0	Albania	London, England
19:45 GMT (UTC±0)	Lewis-Skelly 20'; Kane 77'	Report	Djimsiti (yellow card) 32'	Stadium: Wembley Stadium; Attendance: 82,378; Referee: Alejandro Hernández Hernández (Spain)

24 March 2025	England	3–0	Latvia	London, England
19:45 GMT (UTC±0)	James 38'; Bellingham (yellow card) 42'; Kane 68'; Eze 76'	Report	Meļņiks (yellow card) 85'; Šits (yellow card) 89'	Stadium: Wembley Stadium; Attendance: 79,572; Referee: Orel Grinfeld (Israel)

7 June 2025 2026 FIFA World Cup qualification	Andorra	0–1	England	Barcelona, Spain
18:00 CEST (UTC+2)		Report	Kane 50'	Stadium: RCDE Stadium; Attendance: 8,872; Referee: Igor Pajač (Croatia)

=== England women's national football team ===
==== Results and fixtures ====
===== Friendlies =====
25 October 2024	England	3–4	Germany	London, England
19:30	Stanway 33' (pen.), 36'; Bronze 81'		Gwinn 4' (pen.), 11'; Bühl 29'; Däbritz 72' (pen.)	Stadium: Wembley Stadium

29 October 2024	England	2–1	South Africa	Coventry, England
19:45	Williamson 12'; Clinton 22'		Kgatlana 54'	Stadium: Coventry Arena

30 November 2024	England	0–0	United States	London, England
17:20				Stadium: Wembley Stadium; Attendance: 78,346; Referee: Lina Lehtovaara (Finland)

3 December 2024	England	1–0	Switzerland	Sheffield, England
19:45	Clinton 8'			Stadium: Bramall Lane

29 June 2025	England	7-0	Jamaica	Leicester, England
				Stadium: King Power Stadium

===== UEFA Women's Euro 2025 qualifying =====
====== UEFA Women's Euro 2025 qualifying League A ======
Pos	Team	Pld	W	D	L	GF	GA	GD	Pts	Qualification	(France)	(England)	(Sweden)	(Republic of Ireland)
1	France	6	4	0	2	8	7	+1	12	Qualify for final tournament	—	1–2	2–1	1–0
2	England	6	3	2	1	8	5	+3	11	Qualify for final tournament	1–2	—	1–1	2–1
3	Sweden	6	2	2	2	6	4	+2	8	Advance to play-offs (seeded)	0–1	0–0	—	1–0
4	Republic of Ireland (R)	6	1	0	5	4	10	−6	3	Advance to play-offs (seeded) and relegation to League B	3–1	0–2	0–3	—

Source: UEFA
Rules for classification: Tiebreakers
(R) Relegated

12 July 2024	England	2–1	Republic of Ireland	Norwich, England
	Russo 5'; Stanway 57' (pen.)	Report	Russell 90+4'	Stadium: Carrow Road; Attendance: 23,003; Referee: Catarina Campos (Portugal)

16 July 2024	Sweden	0–0	England	Gothenburg, Sweden
		Report		Stadium: Gamla Ullevi; Attendance: 16,789; Referee: Maria Caputi (Italy)

===== 2025 UEFA Women's Nations League =====
====== 2025 UEFA Women's Nations League A Group A3 ======
Pos	Team	Pld	W	D	L	GF	GA	GD	Pts	Qualification or relegation	(Spain)	(England)	(Belgium)	(Portugal)
1	Spain	6	5	0	1	21	8	+13	15	Qualification for Nations League Finals	—	2–1	3–2	7–1
2	England	6	3	1	2	16	6	+10	10		1–0	—	5–0	6–0
3	Belgium (R)	6	2	0	4	9	16	−7	6	Qualification for relegation play-offs	1–5	3–2	—	0–1
4	Portugal (R)	6	1	1	4	5	21	−16	4	Relegation to League B	2–4	1–1	0–3	—

Source: UEFA
Rules for classification: Tiebreakers
(R) Relegated

21 February 2025	Portugal	1–1	England	Portimão, Portugal
	Nazareth 76'	Report	Russo 15'	Stadium: Estádio Municipal de Portimão; Attendance: 3,221

26 February 2025	England	1–0	Spain	London, England
	Park 33'	Report		Stadium: Wembley Stadium; Attendance: 46,550

4 April 2025	England	5–0	Belgium	Bristol, England
	Bronze 21'; Bright 45+1'; Beever-Jones 67'; Park 78'; Walsh 88'	Report		Stadium: Ashton Gate; Attendance: 23,202; Referee: Marta Huerta de Aza (Spain)

8 April 2025	Belgium	3–2	England	Leuven, Belgium
	Wullaert 4', 29'; Vanhaevermaet 16'	Report	Mead 35' (pen.); Agyemang 81'	Stadium: Den Dreef; Attendance: 6,253; Referee: Maria Caputi (Italy)

30 May 2025	England	6–0	Portugal	London, England
19:45	Beever-Jones 3', 26', 33'; Bronze 5'; Mead 29'; Kelly 62'	Report		Stadium: Wembley Stadium; Attendance: 48,531; Referee: Frida Klarlund (Denmark)

3 June	Spain	2–1	England	Cornellà de Llobregat, Spain
18:00	Pina 60', 70'	Report	Russo 22'	Stadium: RCDE Stadium; Attendance: 14,107; Referee: Katalin Kulcsár (Hungary)

== UEFA competitions ==
=== UEFA Champions League ===
==== League stage ====
===== Arsenal =====
Pos	Team	Pld	W	D	L	GF	GA	GD	Pts	Qualification
1	(The Football Association) Liverpool	8	7	0	1	17	5	+12	21	Advance to round of 16 (seeded)
2	(Royal Spanish Football Federation) Barcelona	8	6	1	1	28	13	+15	19	Advance to round of 16 (seeded)
3	(The Football Association) Arsenal	8	6	1	1	16	3	+13	19	Advance to round of 16 (seeded)
4	(Italian Football Federation) Inter Milan	8	6	1	1	11	1	+10	19	Advance to round of 16 (seeded)
5	(Royal Spanish Football Federation) Atlético Madrid	8	6	0	2	20	12	+8	18	Advance to round of 16 (seeded)

Source: UEFA
Rules for classification: League phase tiebreakers

Home team	Score	Away team
Atalanta (Italy)	0–0	(England) Arsenal
Arsenal (England)	2–0	(France) Paris Saint-Germain
Arsenal (England)	1–0	(Ukraine) Shakhtar Donetsk
Inter Milan (Italy)	1–0	(England) Arsenal
Sporting CP (Portugal)	1–5	(England) Arsenal
Arsenal (England)	3–0	(France) Monaco
Arsenal (England)	3–0	(Croatia) Dinamo Zagreb
Girona (Spain)	1–2	(England) Arsenal

===== Aston Villa =====
Pos	Team	Pld	W	D	L	GF	GA	GD	Pts	Qualification
6	(German Football Association) Bayer Leverkusen	8	5	1	2	15	7	+8	16	Advance to round of 16 (seeded)
7	(French Football Federation) Lille	8	5	1	2	17	10	+7	16	Advance to round of 16 (seeded)
8	(The Football Association) Aston Villa	8	5	1	2	13	6	+7	16	Advance to round of 16 (seeded)
9	(Italian Football Federation) Atalanta	8	4	3	1	20	6	+14	15	Advance to knockout phase play-offs (seeded)
10	(German Football Association) Borussia Dortmund	8	5	0	3	22	12	+10	15	Advance to knockout phase play-offs (seeded)

Source: UEFA
Rules for classification: League phase tiebreakers

Home team	Score	Away team
Young Boys (Switzerland)	0–3	(England) Aston Villa
Aston Villa (England)	1–0	(Germany) Bayern Munich
Aston Villa (England)	2–0	(Italy) Bologna
Club Brugge (Belgium)	1–0	(England) Aston Villa
Aston Villa (England)	0–0	(Italy) Juventus
RB Leipzig (Germany)	2–3	(England) Aston Villa
Monaco (France)	1–0	(England) Aston Villa
Aston Villa (England)	4–2	(Scotland) Celtic

===== Liverpool =====
Pos	Team	Pld	W	D	L	GF	GA	GD	Pts	Qualification
1	(The Football Association) Liverpool	8	7	0	1	17	5	+12	21	Advance to round of 16 (seeded)
2	(Royal Spanish Football Federation) Barcelona	8	6	1	1	28	13	+15	19	Advance to round of 16 (seeded)
3	(The Football Association) Arsenal	8	6	1	1	16	3	+13	19	Advance to round of 16 (seeded)
4	(Italian Football Federation) Inter Milan	8	6	1	1	11	1	+10	19	Advance to round of 16 (seeded)
5	(Royal Spanish Football Federation) Atlético Madrid	8	6	0	2	20	12	+8	18	Advance to round of 16 (seeded)

Source: UEFA
Rules for classification: League phase tiebreakers

Home team	Score	Away team
Milan (Italy)	1–3	(England) Liverpool
Liverpool (England)	2–0	(Italy) Bologna
RB Leipzig (Germany)	0–1	(England) Liverpool
Liverpool (England)	4–0	(Germany) Bayer Leverkusen
Liverpool (England)	2–0	(Spain) Real Madrid
Girona (Spain)	0–1	(England) Liverpool
Liverpool (England)	2–1	(France) Lille
PSV Eindhoven (Netherlands)	3–2	(England) Liverpool

===== Manchester City =====
Pos	Team	Pld	W	D	L	GF	GA	GD	Pts	Qualification
20	(Italian Football Federation) Juventus	8	3	3	2	9	7	+2	12	Advance to knockout phase play-offs (unseeded)
21	(Scottish Football Association) Celtic	8	3	3	2	13	14	−1	12	Advance to knockout phase play-offs (unseeded)
22	(The Football Association) Manchester City	8	3	2	3	18	14	+4	11	Advance to knockout phase play-offs (unseeded)
23	(Portuguese Football Federation) Sporting CP	8	3	2	3	13	12	+1	11	Advance to knockout phase play-offs (unseeded)
24	(Royal Belgian Football Association) Club Brugge	8	3	2	3	7	11	−4	11	Advance to knockout phase play-offs (unseeded)

Source: UEFA
Rules for classification: League phase tiebreakers

Home team	Score	Away team
Manchester City (England)	0–0	(Italy) Inter Milan
Slovan Bratislava (Slovakia)	0–4	(England) Manchester City
Manchester City (England)	5–0	(Czech Republic) Sparta Prague
Sporting CP (Portugal)	4–1	(England) Manchester City
Manchester City (England)	3–3	(Netherlands) Feyenoord
Juventus (Italy)	2–0	(England) Manchester City
Paris Saint-Germain (France)	4–2	(England) Manchester City
Manchester City (England)	3–1	(Belgium) Club Brugge

==== Knockout phase ====
===== Knockout phase play-offs =====
Team 1	Agg.	Team 2	1st leg	2nd leg
Manchester City (England)	3–6	(Spain) Real Madrid	2–3	1–3

===== Round of 16 =====
Team 1	Agg.	Team 2	1st leg	2nd leg
Paris Saint-Germain (France)	1–1 (4–1 p)	(England) Liverpool	0–1	1–0 (a.e.t.)
Club Brugge (Belgium)	1–6	(England) Aston Villa	1–3	0–3
PSV Eindhoven (Netherlands)	3–9	(England) Arsenal	1–7	2–2

===== Quarter-finals =====
Team 1	Agg.	Team 2	1st leg	2nd leg
Paris Saint-Germain (France)	5–4	(England) Aston Villa	3–1	2–3
Arsenal (England)	5–1	(Spain) Real Madrid	3–0	2–1

===== Semi-finals =====
Team 1	Agg.	Team 2	1st leg	2nd leg
Arsenal (England)	1–3	(France) Paris Saint-Germain	0–1	1–2

=== UEFA Europa League ===
==== League stage ====
===== Manchester United =====
Pos	Team	Pld	W	D	L	GF	GA	GD	Pts	Qualification
1	(Italian Football Federation) Lazio	8	6	1	1	17	5	+12	19	Advance to round of 16 (seeded)
2	(Royal Spanish Football Federation) Athletic Bilbao	8	6	1	1	15	7	+8	19	Advance to round of 16 (seeded)
3	(The Football Association) Manchester United	8	5	3	0	16	9	+7	18	Advance to round of 16 (seeded)
4	(The Football Association) Tottenham Hotspur	8	5	2	1	17	9	+8	17	Advance to round of 16 (seeded)
5	(German Football Association) Eintracht Frankfurt	8	5	1	2	14	10	+4	16	Advance to round of 16 (seeded)

Source: UEFA
Rules for classification: League phase tiebreakers

Home team	Score	Away team
Manchester United (England)	1–1	(Netherlands) Twente
Porto (Portugal)	3–3	(England) Manchester United
Fenerbahçe (Turkey)	1–1	(England) Manchester United
Manchester United (England)	2–0	(Greece) PAOK
Manchester United (England)	3–2	(Norway) Bodø/Glimt
Viktoria Plzeň (Czech Republic)	1–2	(England) Manchester United
Manchester United (England)	2–1	(Scotland) Rangers
FCSB (Romania)	0–2	(England) Manchester United

===== Tottenham Hotspur =====
Pos	Team	Pld	W	D	L	GF	GA	GD	Pts	Qualification
2	(Royal Spanish Football Federation) Athletic Bilbao	8	6	1	1	15	7	+8	19	Advance to round of 16 (seeded)
3	(The Football Association) Manchester United	8	5	3	0	16	9	+7	18	Advance to round of 16 (seeded)
4	(The Football Association) Tottenham Hotspur	8	5	2	1	17	9	+8	17	Advance to round of 16 (seeded)
5	(German Football Association) Eintracht Frankfurt	8	5	1	2	14	10	+4	16	Advance to round of 16 (seeded)
6	(French Football Federation) Lyon	8	4	3	1	16	8	+8	15	Advance to round of 16 (seeded)

Source: UEFA
Rules for classification: League phase tiebreakers

Home team	Score	Away team
Tottenham Hotspur (England)	3–0	(Azerbaijan) Qarabağ
Ferencváros (Hungary)	1–2	(England) Tottenham Hotspur
Tottenham Hotspur (England)	1–0	(Netherlands) AZ
Galatasaray (Turkey)	3–2	(England) Tottenham Hotspur
Tottenham Hotspur (England)	2–2	(Italy) Roma
Rangers (Scotland)	1–1	(England) Tottenham Hotspur
TSG Hoffenheim (Germany)	2–3	(England) Tottenham Hotspur
Tottenham Hotspur (England)	3–0	(Sweden) IF Elfsborg

==== Knockout phase ====
===== Round of 16 =====
Team 1	Agg.	Team 2	1st leg	2nd leg
AZ (Netherlands)	2–3	(England) Tottenham Hotspur	1–0	1–3
Real Sociedad (Spain)	2–5	(England) Manchester United	1–1	1–4

===== Quarter-finals =====
Team 1	Agg.	Team 2	1st leg	2nd leg
Tottenham Hotspur (England)	2–1	(Germany) Eintracht Frankfurt	1–1	1–0
Lyon (France)	6–7	(England) Manchester United	2–2	4–5 (a.e.t.)

===== Semi-finals =====
Team 1	Agg.	Team 2	1st leg	2nd leg
Tottenham Hotspur (England)	5–1	(Norway) Bodø/Glimt	3–1	2–0
Athletic Bilbao (Spain)	1–7	(England) Manchester United	0–3	1–4

===== Final =====
21 May 2025
21:00 UTC+2

Tottenham Hotspur (The Football Association)	1–0	(The Football Association) Manchester United
Johnson 42'	Report

San Mamés, Bilbao
Attendance: 49,224
Referee: Felix Zwayer (Germany)

=== UEFA Conference League ===
==== Play-off round ====
Team 1	Agg.	Team 2	1st leg	2nd leg
Chelsea (England)	3–2	(Switzerland) Servette	2–0	1–2

==== League phase ====
===== Chelsea =====
Pos	Team	Pld	W	D	L	GF	GA	GD	Pts	Qualification
1	(The Football Association) Chelsea	6	6	0	0	26	5	+21	18	Advance to round of 16 (seeded)
2	(Portuguese Football Federation) Vitória de Guimarães	6	4	2	0	13	6	+7	14	Advance to round of 16 (seeded)
3	(Italian Football Federation) Fiorentina	6	4	1	1	18	7	+11	13	Advance to round of 16 (seeded)
4	(Austrian Football Association) Rapid Wien	6	4	1	1	11	5	+6	13	Advance to round of 16 (seeded)
5	(Swedish Football Association) Djurgårdens IF	6	4	1	1	11	7	+4	13 (Note: Away goals scored: Djurgårdens IF 5, Lugano 4.)	Advance to round of 16 (seeded)

Source: UEFA
Rules for classification: League phase tiebreakers
Notes:

Home team	Score	Away team
Chelsea (England)	4–2	(Belgium) Gent
Panathinaikos (Greece)	1–4	(England) Chelsea
Chelsea (England)	8–0	(Armenia) Noah
1. FC Heidenheim (Germany)	0–2	(England) Chelsea
Astana (Kazakhstan)	1–3	(England) Chelsea
Chelsea (England)	5–1	(Republic of Ireland) Shamrock Rovers

==== Knockout phase ====
===== Round of 16 =====
Team 1	Agg.	Team 2	1st leg	2nd leg
Copenhagen (Denmark)	1–3	(England) Chelsea	1–2	0–1

===== Quarter-finals =====
Team 1	Agg.	Team 2	1st leg	2nd leg
Legia Warsaw (Poland)	2–4 (Note: Order of legs reversed in order to avoid a scheduling conflict with the Europa League's Tottenham Hotspur v Eintracht Frankfurt match in the same city.)	(England) Chelsea	0–3	2–1

===== Semi-finals =====
Team 1	Agg.	Team 2	1st leg	2nd leg
Djurgårdens IF (Sweden)	1–5 (Note: Order of legs reversed in order to avoid a scheduling conflict with the Europa League's Tottenham Hotspur v Bodø/Glimt match in the same city.)	(England) Chelsea	1–4	0–1

===== Final =====
28 May 2025
21:00 UTC+2

Real Betis (Royal Spanish Football Federation)	1–4	(The Football Association) Chelsea
Ezzalzouli 9'	Report	Fernández 65'; Jackson 70'; Sancho 83'; Caicedo 90+1'

Wrocław Stadium, Wrocław
Attendance: 39,754
Referee: Irfan Peljto (Bosnia and Herzegovina)

=== UEFA Women's Champions League ===
==== Qualifying rounds ====
===== Round 1 =====
====== Semi-finals ======
Home team	Score	Away team
Arsenal (England)	6–0	(Scotland) Rangers

====== Final ======
Home team	Score	Away team
Arsenal (England)	1–0	(Norway) Rosenborg

===== Round 2 =====
Team 1	Agg.	Team 2	1st leg	2nd leg
Paris FC (France)	0–8	(England) Manchester City	0–5	0–3
BK Häcken (Sweden)	1–4	(England) Arsenal	1–0	0–4

==== Group stage ====
===== Group B =====
Pos	Team	Pld	W	D	L	GF	GA	GD	Pts	Qualification	CHE	RMA	TWE	CEL
1	(England) Chelsea	6	6	0	0	19	6	+13	18	Advance to quarter-finals	—	3–2	6–1	3–0
2	(Spain) Real Madrid	6	4	0	2	20	7	+13	12	Advance to quarter-finals	1–2	—	7–0	4–0
3	(Netherlands) Twente	6	2	0	4	9	19	−10	6		1–3	2–3	—	3–0
4	(Scotland) Celtic	6	0	0	6	1	17	−16	0		1–2	0–3	0–2	—

Source: UEFA
Rules for classification: Group stage tiebreakers

===== Group C =====
Pos	Team	Pld	W	D	L	GF	GA	GD	Pts	Qualification	ARS	BAY	JUV	VÅL
1	(England) Arsenal	6	5	0	1	17	9	+8	15	Advance to quarter-finals	—	3–2	1–0	4–1
2	(Germany) Bayern Munich	6	4	1	1	17	6	+11	13	Advance to quarter-finals	5–2	—	4–0	3–0
3	(Italy) Juventus	6	2	0	4	4	11	−7	6		0–4	0–2	—	3–0
4	(Norway) Vålerenga	6	0	1	5	3	15	−12	1		1–3	1–1	0–1	—

Source: UEFA
Rules for classification: Group stage tiebreakers

===== Group D =====
Pos	Team	Pld	W	D	L	GF	GA	GD	Pts	Qualification	BAR	MCI	HAM	PÖL
1	(Spain) Barcelona	6	5	0	1	26	3	+23	15 (Note: Barcelona 3 Pts, +1 GD; Manchester City 3 Pts, −1 GD.)	Advance to quarter-finals	—	3–0	9–0	7–0
2	(England) Manchester City	6	5	0	1	11	6	+5	15	Advance to quarter-finals	2–0	—	2–0	2–0
3	(Sweden) Hammarby	6	2	0	4	5	17	−12	6		0–3	1–2	—	2–0
4	(Austria) St. Pölten	6	0	0	6	4	20	−16	0		1–4	2–3	1–2	—

Source: UEFA
Rules for classification: Group stage tiebreakers

==== Knockout phase ====
===== Quarter-finals =====
Team 1	Agg.	Team 2	1st leg	2nd leg
Real Madrid (Spain)	2–3	(England) Arsenal	2–0	0–3
Manchester City (England)	2–3	(England) Chelsea	2–0	0–3

===== Semi-finals =====
Team 1	Agg.	Team 2	1st leg	2nd leg
Barcelona (Spain)	8–2	(England) Chelsea	4–1	4–1
Arsenal (England)	5–3	(France) Lyon	1–2	4–1

===== Final =====
24 May 2025
17:00 UTC+1

Arsenal (The Football Association)	1–0	(Royal Spanish Football Federation) Barcelona
Blackstenius 74'	Report

Estádio José Alvalade, Lisbon
Attendance: 38,356
Referee: Ivana Martinčić (Croatia)

=== UEFA Youth League ===
==== UEFA Champions League Path ====
===== Arsenal =====
Pos	Team	Pld	W	D	L	GF	GA	GD	Pts
24	(German Football Association) Bayer Leverkusen	6	2	1	3	7	9	−2	7
25	(Royal Dutch Football Association) PSV Eindhoven	6	1	3	2	8	9	−1	6
26	(The Football Association) Arsenal	6	2	0	4	5	12	−7	6
27	(Italian Football Federation) Milan	6	1	2	3	7	11	−4	5 (Note: Away goals scored: Milan 5; Red Star Belgrade 4.)
28	(Football Association of Serbia) Red Star Belgrade	6	1	2	3	7	11	−4	5

Source: UEFA
Rules for classification: League phase tiebreakers
Notes:

Home team	Score	Away team
Atalanta (Italy)	4–1	(England) Arsenal
Arsenal (England)	1–0	(France) Paris Saint-Germain
Arsenal (England)	0–1	(Ukraine) Shakhtar Donetsk
Inter Milan (Italy)	4–1	(England) Arsenal
Sporting CP (Portugal)	3–0	(England) Arsenal
Arsenal (England)	2–0	(France) Monaco

===== Aston Villa =====
Pos	Team	Pld	W	D	L	GF	GA	GD	Pts	Qualification
13	(German Football Association) Bayern Munich	6	3	1	2	11	12	−1	10	Advance to knockout phase
14	(Ukrainian Association of Football) Shakhtar Donetsk	6	3	1	2	9	11	−2	10	Advance to knockout phase
15	(The Football Association) Aston Villa	6	3	0	3	14	11	+3	9	Advance to knockout phase
16	(Austrian Football Association) Sturm Graz	6	2	3	1	10	8	+2	9	Advance to knockout phase
17	(Scottish Football Association) Celtic	6	3	0	3	10	10	0	9	Advance to knockout phase

Source: UEFA
Rules for classification: League phase tiebreakers

Home team	Score	Away team
Young Boys (Switzerland)	2–1	(England) Aston Villa
Aston Villa (England)	0–1	(Germany) Bayern Munich
Aston Villa (England)	3–1	(Italy) Bologna
Club Brugge (Belgium)	2–6	(England) Aston Villa
Aston Villa (England)	0–2	(Italy) Juventus
RB Leipzig (Germany)	3–4	(England) Aston Villa

===== Liverpool =====
Pos	Team	Pld	W	D	L	GF	GA	GD	Pts	Qualification
17	(Scottish Football Association) Celtic	6	3	0	3	10	10	0	9	Advance to knockout phase
18	(German Football Association) Borussia Dortmund	6	2	2	2	11	8	+3	8	Advance to knockout phase
19	(The Football Association) Liverpool	6	2	2	2	9	8	+1	8	Advance to knockout phase
20	(French Football Federation) Lille	6	1	5	0	8	7	+1	8	Advance to knockout phase
21	(Croatian Football Federation) Dinamo Zagreb	6	2	2	2	8	8	0	8	Advance to knockout phase

Source: UEFA
Rules for classification: League phase tiebreakers

Home team	Score	Away team
Milan (Italy)	0–0	(England) Liverpool
Liverpool (England)	2–1	(Italy) Bologna
RB Leipzig (Germany)	3–1	(England) Liverpool
Liverpool (England)	4–1	(Germany) Bayer Leverkusen
Liverpool (England)	0–1	(Spain) Real Madrid
Girona (Spain)	2–2	(England) Liverpool

===== Manchester City =====
Pos	Team	Pld	W	D	L	GF	GA	GD	Pts	Qualification
9	(Portuguese Football Federation) Benfica	6	3	2	1	12	7	+5	11	Advance to knockout phase
10	(Italian Football Federation) Juventus	6	3	2	1	9	4	+5	11	Advance to knockout phase
11	(The Football Association) Manchester City	6	3	1	2	16	8	+8	10	Advance to knockout phase
12	(Royal Spanish Football Federation) Girona	6	2	4	0	9	5	+4	10	Advance to knockout phase
13	(German Football Association) Bayern Munich	6	3	1	2	11	12	−1	10	Advance to knockout phase

Source: UEFA
Rules for classification: League phase tiebreakers

Home team	Score	Away team
Manchester City (England)	2–4	(Italy) Inter Milan
Slovan Bratislava (Slovakia)	0–4	(England) Manchester City
Manchester City (England)	3–0	(Czech Republic) Sparta Prague
Sporting CP (Portugal)	2–0	(England) Manchester City
Manchester City (England)	6–1	(Netherlands) Feyenoord
Juventus (Italy)	1–1	(England) Manchester City

==== Domestic Champions Path ====
===== Second round =====
Team 1	Agg.	Team 2	1st leg	2nd leg
Žalgiris (Lithuania)	2–11	(England) Manchester United	2–5	0–6

===== Third round =====
Team 1	Agg.	Team 2	1st leg	2nd leg
AZ (Netherlands)	2–1	(England) Manchester United	2–1	0–0

==== Knockout phase ====
===== Round of 32 =====
Home team	Score	Away team
VfB Stuttgart (Germany)	2–2 (5–3 p)	(England) Liverpool
Midtjylland (Denmark)	2–2 (4–5 p)	(England) Manchester City
Puskás Akadémia (Hungary)	1–2	(England) Aston Villa

===== Round of 16 =====
Home team	Score	Away team
TSG Hoffenheim (Germany)	1–2	(England) Manchester City
Aston Villa (England)	1–3	(Spain) Barcelona

===== Quarter-finals =====
Home team	Score	Away team
AZ (Netherlands)	1–0	(England) Manchester City

== Men's football ==
League Division	Promoted to league ▲	Relegated from league ▼
Premier League	Leicester City ▲; Ipswich Town ▲; Southampton ▲	Luton Town ▼; Burnley ▼; Sheffield United ▼
Championship	Portsmouth ▲; Derby County ▲; Oxford United ▲	Birmingham City ▼; Huddersfield Town ▼; Rotherham United ▼
League One	Stockport County ▲; Wrexham ▲; Mansfield Town ▲; Crawley Town ▲	Cheltenham Town ▼; Port Vale ▼; Fleetwood Town ▼; Carlisle United ▼
League Two	Chesterfield ▲; Bromley ▲	Sutton United ▼; Forest Green Rovers ▼
National League	Tamworth ▲; Yeovil Town ▲; Boston United ▲; Braintree Town ▲	Boreham Wood ▼; Kidderminster Harriers ▼; Dorking Wanderers ▼; Oxford City ▼

=== Premier League ===
In spite of both a quiet summer transfer window and off-field concerns regarding the contractual future of certain players, Liverpool defied expectations in new head coach Arne Slot's first season in charge to win their second Premier League title and their 20th league title overall – drawing them back level with Manchester United; whilst enduring exits in the New Year from both the Champions League and the FA Cup, as well as a narrow loss in the League Cup final, the Reds stayed virtually top of the table from late September onwards, taking advantage of slip-ups below them and winning the title at the end of April, the contractual concerns simultaneously easing in the closing weeks with both forward Mohamed Salah and defender Virgil van Dijk signing extensions. Arsenal finished second for the third season in a row, the Gunners being let down by too many draws (including more dropped points from winning positions than the previous two seasons combined) that resulted in the gap ultimately becoming insurmountable – with even a strong run to the Champions League semi-finals amounting to nothing, as the North London club went a fifth successive season without a trophy.

The battle to ensure the remaining Champions League places, with the top five teams now qualifying for the competition, went to the final game week; Manchester City endured arguably their worst season since their financial takeover in 2008 – despite making a strong start, a long-term injury to midfielder Rodri in late September sparked a horrendous run of form that saw them rapidly fall away from the top of the league table and endure early exits from both the League Cup in late October and the Champions League before the round-of-16; whilst a late run of results saw the club haul themselves into third place and once again ensure Champions League football, their failure to win a trophy – including losing the FA Cup final for a second consecutive season – capped off a very disappointing season, arguably the worst of Pep Guardiola's tenure. Despite a poor run of form in the winter and some questions regarding the tactics of new head coach Enzo Maresca, both a strong start and a strong finish to their league saw Chelsea secure a return to the Champions League, on top of winning the Europa Conference League - ultimately taking fourth place and becoming the first side to win all five major UEFA competitions. Newcastle United took fifth place and the final Champions League spot despite losing their final two games of the season, capping a fantastic season in which the club finally ended their 56-year wait for a trophy with victory in the League Cup. A controversial final day loss, alongside mixed results in the league games after their Champions League exploits, ultimately cost Aston Villa a place in the top five, instead consigning them to the Europa League - still another successful season for the Villans, who reached the quarter-finals of the Champions League, their remarkable run including a home win over Bayern Munich and pushing Paris Saint Germain all the way in their two-legged quarter finals. Being expected to struggle again, Nottingham Forest defied expectations by qualifying for Europe for the first time in nearly thirty years, qualifying for the Europa Conference League, and never once looking likely to be dragged into the relegation mire - while a poor end to the season cost the Reds a top five finish, having stayed within the top five for much of the campaign, it was still a wonderful achievement for the East Midlands club. Despite making a rough start to their campaign, including just hovering above the drop zone going into Christmas, a strong second half of the season saw Crystal Palace achieve arguably their greatest season since their third-place finish in 1991, the Eagles also breaking a new club record for most points in the Premier League era – and winning their first ever trophy with victory in the FA Cup, ensuring European qualification for the first time, all in Oliver Glasner's first full season as manager.

Manchester United's freefall since the retirement of Sir Alex Ferguson continued in dramatic fashion; an underwhelming start, considering a busy summer transfer window, saw manager Erik ten Hag sacked in late October, with his replacement in Ruben Amorim winning just seven league games from the November international break onwards as the Red Devils finished with 42 points, their lowest total since 1990, their lowest league finish since being promoted to the top-flight in 1975 and their most league losses in a season for over fifty years, on top of a multitude of poor results. Tottenham Hotspur fared little better, the team struggling with an extensive injury crisis throughout the season and finishing in their lowest league position since their promotion to the top-flight in 1978 while breaking unwanted club records for both points total and number of losses in a top flight season, on top of fan anger against owner Daniel Levy (and to a lesser extent, head coach Ange Postecoglou) continuing to grow; however, it was in Europe that both teams excelled, making it all the way to the Europa League final against all the odds, with Tottenham winning to ensure both a return to the Champions League and their first trophy since winning the League Cup in 2008, while United finished their season without a trophy and missed out on European qualification for only the second time since the re-admission of English clubs to Europe in 1990.

For the second season in a row, and only the third time in Premier League history, all three promoted sides endured an immediate return to the Championship, with relegation being confirmed with at least four games to go; Southampton finished bottom once again, similarly going through three different managers and also breaking records for all the wrong reasons including enduring the earliest relegation in terms of games still to play (being relegated with seven games left) and finishing with the worst statistical home record in top flight history (one win and six points) – whilst the Saints did barely avoid equalling both Derby County's infamously low points and wins totals set in 2008, they took the unwanted record of being the first Premier League team to record 30 losses in a season, and the first top-flight team overall to lose 30 or more games in a season since Stoke City 40 years earlier. Finishing above them were Ipswich Town, whose long-awaited return to the top flight proved to be disappointing, the Tractor Boys ultimately being let down by poor form at Portman Road – only securing a single win, whilst winning three on the road – and failing to turn committed performances into results. Taking the final relegation spot were Leicester City; the sacking of manager Steve Cooper, appointed in the summer following the pre-season departure of promotion-winning manager Enzo Maresca, in favour of Ruud van Nistelrooy before Christmas proved a massive misfire with the Foxes failing to score in nine consecutive home games and only finishing the best of the relegated sides with a decent run of form after relegation.

Pos	Team	Pld	W	D	L	GF	GA	GD	Pts	Qualification or relegation
1	Liverpool (C)	38	25	9	4	86	41	+45	84	Qualification for the Champions League league phase (Note: The Premier League gained an additional Champions League place as a result of England gaining one of the two European Performance Spots (EPS) awarded to the two associations with the highest UEFA coefficient points in 2024–25.)
2	Arsenal	38	20	14	4	69	34	+35	74	Qualification for the Champions League league phase
3	Manchester City	38	21	8	9	72	44	+28	71	Qualification for the Champions League league phase
4	Chelsea	38	20	9	9	64	43	+21	69	Qualification for the Champions League league phase
5	Newcastle United	38	20	6	12	68	47	+21	66	Qualification for the Champions League league phase
6	Aston Villa	38	19	9	10	58	51	+7	66	Qualification for the Europa League league phase (Note: Initially, Crystal Palace qualified for the Europa League league phase as the 2024–25 FA Cup winners. However, due to multi-club ownership rules, they were not permitted to enter the Europa League and entered the Conference League play-off round instead, with 7th-placed Nottingham Forest taking their place in the Europa League. Crystal Palace appealed the decision but this was ultimately rejected.)
7	Nottingham Forest	38	19	8	11	58	46	+12	65	Qualification for the Europa League league phase
8	Brighton & Hove Albion	38	16	13	9	66	59	+7	61	
9	Bournemouth	38	15	11	12	58	46	+12	56	
10	Brentford	38	16	8	14	66	57	+9	56	
11	Fulham	38	15	9	14	54	54	0	54	
12	Crystal Palace	38	13	14	11	51	51	0	53	Qualification for the Conference League play-off round (Note: Since the winners of the 2024–25 EFL Cup, Newcastle United, qualified for the Champions League via league position, the spot reserved for the EFL Cup winners (Conference League play-off round) was initially passed to the 7th-placed team (Nottingham Forest). However due to multi-club ownership rules, the winners of the FA Cup, Crystal Palace, were not permitted to enter the Europa League and entered the Conference League play-off round instead, with Nottingham Forest taking their place in the Europa League. Crystal Palace appealed the decision but this was ultimately rejected.)
13	Everton	38	11	15	12	42	44	−2	48	
14	West Ham United	38	11	10	17	46	62	−16	43	
15	Manchester United	38	11	9	18	44	54	−10	42	
16	Wolverhampton Wanderers	38	12	6	20	54	69	−15	42	
17	Tottenham Hotspur	38	11	5	22	64	65	−1	38	Qualification for the Champions League league phase (Note: Tottenham Hotspur qualified for the Champions League league phase as the 2024–25 UEFA Europa League winners.)
18	Leicester City (R)	38	6	7	25	33	80	−47	25	Relegation to EFL Championship
19	Ipswich Town (R)	38	4	10	24	36	82	−46	22	Relegation to EFL Championship
20	Southampton (R)	38	2	6	30	26	86	−60	12	Relegation to EFL Championship

Source: Premier League
Rules for classification: 1) Points; 2) Goal difference; 3) Goals scored; 4) If the champions, relegated teams or qualified teams for UEFA competitions cannot be determined by rules 1 to 3, rules 4.1 to 4.3 are applied – 4.1) Points gained in head-to-head record between such teams; 4.2) Away goals scored in head-to-head record between such teams; 4.3) Play-offs
(C) Champions; (R) Relegated

=== Championship ===
In what was principally a three-horse race for the title, Leeds United and Burnley won promotion with two games to spare, both sides reaching the 100-point mark for the first time in the history of the second tier - Leeds coming on top to secure the title on goal difference - another first for the Championship. The Whites enjoyed a fantastic season in both attack and defence as they won the title after occupying top position for much of the season after November; a shaky run of form in March threatened to derail the club's run, but Daniel Farke's side recovered impressively to secure the German's third Championship title following the two with Norwich. Burnley finished 2nd, the Clarets smashing the defensive record for the entire Football League, conceding just 16 goals and finishing the season on a 33-match unbeaten run, only losing twice, the final loss coming on 21 December; perhaps the only minor disappointment was a run of too many draws that prevented Scott Parker's side - his third promotion from the Championship, all with different clubs - from possibly breaking even more records. The play-offs were won by Sunderland; the club enjoyed a hugely improved campaign under new manager Régis Le Bris, leading the table for large parts of the first half and only falling out of the race for automatic promotion by virtue of several runs of indifferent form from November onwards; still, the Black Cats never fell out of the top four before edging their way through the play-offs in dramatic fashion, with late winners in both the semi-final and the final, to end their eight-year exile from the top flight.

Another topsy-turvy relegation battle ensued, with several sides in the mix until the end and only one team having their relegation confirmed before the final matchday. Cardiff City were the first side to suffer relegation, dropping into the third tier for the first time in 22 years; the Bluebirds remained in the relegation mire all season long, looking like overcoming a bad start to the season - only for a run of just five wins after December to go against them and send them back into the bottom three. Plymouth Argyle were the second side to go down; the Pilgrims never recovering from the disastrous pre-season decision to appoint England legend Wayne Rooney as they struggled; even a late improvement in form after the hiring of new manager Miron Muslić, including a shock FA Cup victory over Liverpool in February came too little too late as the club returned to League One after two years. The final relegation place went to Luton Town; having been tipped for an immediate return to the Premier League; the Hatters were in the relegation mire from the start, and despite seemingly recovering, a terrible run of form after Christmas plunged them into the bottom three; a late good run of form under new manager Matt Bloomfield not proving enough as the club became the first since Sunderland in 2018 to suffer two successive relegations from the top flight to the third tier, returning to League One after six years.

Pos	Team	Pld	W	D	L	GF	GA	GD	Pts	Promotion, qualification or relegation
1	Leeds United (C, P)	46	29	13	4	95	30	+65	100	Promotion to the Premier League
2	Burnley (P)	46	28	16	2	69	16	+53	100	Promotion to the Premier League
3	Sheffield United	46	28	8	10	63	36	+27	90 (Note: Sheffield United were deducted two points for defaulting on payments to other clubs during the 2022–23 and 2023–24 seasons, with a further two points suspended.)	Qualified for the Championship play-offs
4	Sunderland (O, P)	46	21	13	12	58	44	+14	76	Qualified for the Championship play-offs
5	Coventry City	46	20	9	17	64	58	+6	69	Qualified for the Championship play-offs
6	Bristol City	46	17	17	12	59	55	+4	68	Qualified for the Championship play-offs
7	Blackburn Rovers	46	19	9	18	53	48	+5	66	
8	Millwall	46	18	12	16	47	49	−2	66	
9	West Bromwich Albion	46	15	19	12	57	47	+10	64	
10	Middlesbrough	46	18	10	18	64	56	+8	64	
11	Swansea City	46	17	10	19	51	56	−5	61	
12	Sheffield Wednesday	46	15	13	18	60	69	−9	58	
13	Norwich City	46	14	15	17	71	68	+3	57	
14	Watford	46	16	9	21	53	61	−8	57	
15	Queens Park Rangers	46	14	14	18	53	63	−10	56	
16	Portsmouth	46	14	12	20	58	71	−13	54	
17	Oxford United	46	13	14	19	49	65	−16	53	
18	Stoke City	46	12	15	19	45	62	−17	51	
19	Derby County	46	13	11	22	48	56	−8	50	
20	Preston North End	46	10	20	16	48	59	−11	50	
21	Hull City	46	12	13	21	44	54	−10	49	
22	Luton Town (R)	46	13	10	23	45	69	−24	49	Relegation to EFL League One
23	Plymouth Argyle (R)	46	11	13	22	51	88	−37	46	Relegation to EFL League One
24	Cardiff City (R)	46	9	17	20	48	73	−25	44	Relegation to EFL League One

Source: English Football League
Rules for classification: 1) Points; 2) Goal difference; 3) Number of goals scored; 4) Head-to-head results; 5) Wins; 6) Away goals; 7) Penalty points (sec 9.5); 8) Number of 12-point sending off offences; 9) Play-off (only if needed to determine promotion/relegation)
(C) Champions; (O) Play-off winners; (P) Promoted; (R) Relegated

=== League One ===
In a similar manner to their last season in the third tier in 1995 and after years of disappointing league campaigns on and off the field, Birmingham City secured an emphatic immediate return to the Championship, this time around smashing the record for the most points secured across the entire Football League – and their first promotion since 2009; the Blues' success came as a result of never once relinquishing top spot after going top in late September and an unbeaten season at home, perhaps the only disappointment being a failure to win their first trophy since 2011, narrowly losing out in the Football League Trophy. The battle for the second automatic promotion place went to the penultimate week, with Wycombe Wanderers and Wrexham pushing each other close; in the end, Wrexham won out, the Red Dragons continuing their spectacular rise up the Football League pyramid - becoming the first side in English football history to win three successive promotions, solidifying themselves into the promotion race early on and finishing with impressive run of form in the closing stages of the season to seal their return to the second tier after a 43-year absence. Charlton Athletic's first full season under Nathan Jones was a success; in spite of a mediocre start, the Addicks reached the top six by virtue of a storming run of form in the closing stages of the season, to reach the play-offs and win promotion, defeating Leyton Orient in the final - exactly eleven years to the date the O's lost the play-off final for the last time - and thus ending their five-year exile from the Championship.

Shrewsbury Town were the first side to go down, in a terrible season in which the Shrews only once escaped the drop zone and changed managers three times, returning to the Football League's basement tier after ten years. Cambridge United were the next side to face relegation, enduring a similarly horrible season as they only spent one matchday out of the bottom four - as they started the season with just one point from their first ten games - and returned to League Two after four seasons, despite the managerial presence of experienced managers Garry Monk and Neil Harris - the latter's second spell in charge of the club. Bristol Rovers endured a torrid campaign, remaining in the relegation mire for the entire season; the appointment of Iñigo Calderón seemed to turn their fortunes around, but a total collapse in the end of the season, with just one draw picked up from their final ten games, consigned the Pirates to League Two after three years away. Crawley Town never managed to adjust to life back in League One after ten years and went straight down, in a turbulent season that saw them change managers four times - but at least they went down fighting following a late improvement after promotion winning manager Scott Lindsey returned for a second spell. Having started the season winless in their first 14 matches and with just two wins by the end of January, several good runs of form after that point for Burton Albion, coupled with Bristol Rovers' late collapse, saw the Brewers secure their safety in the penultimate week.

Pos	Team	Pld	W	D	L	GF	GA	GD	Pts	Promotion, qualification or relegation
1	Birmingham City (C, P)	46	34	9	3	84	31	+53	111	Promotion to EFL Championship
2	Wrexham (P)	46	27	11	8	67	34	+33	92	Promotion to EFL Championship
3	Stockport County	46	25	12	9	72	42	+30	87	Qualification for League One play-offs
4	Charlton Athletic (O, P)	46	25	10	11	67	43	+24	85	Qualification for League One play-offs
5	Wycombe Wanderers	46	24	12	10	70	45	+25	84	Qualification for League One play-offs
6	Leyton Orient	46	24	6	16	72	48	+24	78	Qualification for League One play-offs
7	Reading	46	21	12	13	68	57	+11	75	
8	Bolton Wanderers	46	20	8	18	67	70	−3	68	
9	Blackpool	46	17	16	13	72	60	+12	67	
10	Huddersfield Town	46	19	7	20	58	55	+3	64	
11	Lincoln City	46	16	13	17	64	56	+8	61	
12	Barnsley	46	17	10	19	69	73	−4	61	
13	Rotherham United	46	16	11	19	54	59	−5	59	
14	Stevenage	46	15	12	19	42	50	−8	57	
15	Wigan Athletic	46	13	17	16	40	42	−2	56	
16	Exeter City	46	15	11	20	49	65	−16	56	
17	Mansfield Town	46	15	9	22	60	73	−13	54	
18	Peterborough United	46	13	12	21	68	81	−13	51	
19	Northampton Town	46	12	15	19	48	66	−18	51	
20	Burton Albion	46	11	14	21	49	66	−17	47	
21	Crawley Town (R)	46	12	10	24	57	83	−26	46	Relegation to EFL League Two
22	Bristol Rovers (R)	46	12	7	27	44	76	−32	43	Relegation to EFL League Two
23	Cambridge United (R)	46	9	11	26	45	73	−28	38	Relegation to EFL League Two
24	Shrewsbury Town (R)	46	8	9	29	41	79	−38	33	Relegation to EFL League Two

Source: EFL Official Website
Rules for classification: 1) Points; 2) Goal difference; 3) Number of goals scored; 4) Head-to-head results; 5) Wins; 6) Away goals; 7) Penalty points (sec 9.5); 8) 12-point sending off offences
(C) Champions; (O) Play-off winners; (P) Promoted; (R) Relegated

=== League Two ===
Having looked all-but decided going into the New Year, the race for the League Two title ended up going to the penultimate week of the season – a race that saw Doncaster Rovers make amends for their play-off miss the previous season and ensure a return to League One after three years, ultimately taking advantage of the teams around them dropping points. Similarly, the race to decide the automatic promotion places was only decided on the final two weekends, with Port Vale finishing second and securing an immediate return to the third tier, overcoming a poor run of form in the run-up to Christmas in the process. Finishing third - by virtue of a 96th-minute winner in their final game - were Bradford City, who secured their first promotion in twelve years; the Bantams slowly progressing up the table and firmly consolidating themselves in the play-off positions thanks to a strong ten-match winning run at Valley Parade, before sneaking into third on the final day. Taking the final spot through the playoffs were AFC Wimbledon, the Dons impressing with the meanest defence of the campaign to secure a return to the third tier just three years after what had been their first ever relegation - and earning manager Johnnie Jackson his first managerial promotion.

Just two seasons after playing in the third tier, Morecambe's 18-year stay in the Football League came to an end as they finished bottom – despite the return of promotion-winning manager Derek Adams for a third spell in charge, a miserable start to the season saw the Shrimps fall into the drop zone in only the third week, spending just one week outside of it during the whole campaign. A late season improvement, timed with the appointment of veteran manager Mark Hughes and a downturn in form for Accrington Stanley, saw Carlisle United take the battle to avoid relegation to the penultimate weekend, but a similar upturn in form from Tranmere Rovers, as well as several late crucial points for Stanley, condemned the Cumbrian side to a second successive relegation and saw them drop into non-league football, exactly twenty years after having last played in the fifth tier.

Pos	Team	Pld	W	D	L	GF	GA	GD	Pts	Promotion, qualification or relegation
1	Doncaster Rovers (C, P)	46	24	12	10	73	50	+23	84	Promotion to EFL League One
2	Port Vale (P)	46	22	14	10	65	46	+19	80	Promotion to EFL League One
3	Bradford City (P)	46	22	12	12	64	45	+19	78	Promotion to EFL League One
4	Walsall	46	21	14	11	75	54	+21	77	Qualification for League Two play-offs
5	AFC Wimbledon (O, P)	46	20	13	13	56	35	+21	73	Qualification for League Two play-offs
6	Notts County	46	20	12	14	68	49	+19	72	Qualification for League Two play-offs
7	Chesterfield	46	19	13	14	73	54	+19	70	Qualification for League Two play-offs
8	Salford City	46	18	15	13	64	54	+10	69	
9	Grimsby Town	46	20	8	18	61	67	−6	68	
10	Colchester United	46	16	19	11	52	47	+5	67	
11	Bromley	46	17	15	14	64	59	+5	66	
12	Swindon Town	46	15	17	14	71	63	+8	62	
13	Crewe Alexandra	46	15	17	14	49	48	+1	62	
14	Fleetwood Town	46	15	15	16	60	60	0	60	
15	Cheltenham Town	46	16	12	18	60	70	−10	60	
16	Barrow	46	15	14	17	52	50	+2	59	
17	Gillingham	46	14	16	16	41	46	−5	58	
18	Harrogate Town	46	14	11	21	43	61	−18	53	
19	Milton Keynes Dons	46	14	10	22	52	66	−14	52	
20	Tranmere Rovers	46	12	15	19	45	65	−20	51	
21	Accrington Stanley	46	12	14	20	53	69	−16	50	
22	Newport County	46	13	10	23	52	76	−24	49	
23	Carlisle United (R)	46	10	12	24	44	71	−27	42	Relegation to National League
24	Morecambe (R)	46	10	6	30	40	72	−32	36	Relegation to National League

Source: EFL Official Website
Rules for classification: 1) Points; 2) Goal difference; 3) Number of goals scored; 4) Head-to-head results; 5) Wins; 6) Away goals; 7) Penalty points (sec 9.5); 8) 12-point sending off offences
(C) Champions; (O) Play-off winners; (P) Promoted; (R) Relegated

=== National League ===
After consecutive near-misses in the play-offs in previous seasons and in spite of a late scare in April, a strong second half of the season saw Barnet achieve their fourth promotion to the Football League – returning to the fourth tier after seven years away, and finally securing head coach Dean Brennan his first promotion out of the non-league system (his previous promotions having all been from the fifth tier and below). Taking the final spot through the play-offs were Oldham Athletic, the Latics overcoming Southend United in a topsy-turvy play-off final to secure their return to the Football League after a three-season absence - ensuring not only their first promotion since 1991, but also earning manager Micky Mellon his sixth managerial promotion.

At the bottom of the table, Ebbsfleet United were the first team in all of the top five tiers to endure relegation, falling back into the sixth tier after only three years; the Kent side endured one of the worst runs of form in the season, winning just once between the start of the campaign and mid-March, only picking up their second win a week before relegation was confirmed, statistically finishing with one of the worst final points totals in the history of the fifth tier. AFC Fylde finished just above them, ultimately being undone by their wretched away form that saw them pick up just eleven points – and making it through four different managers across the campaign. Despite some spirited runs of form across the season, Maidenhead United's luck finally gave out as they endured their first relegation since 2007, with manager Alan Devonshire unable to mark a decade in charge of the Magpies with another escape from the drop. The final place was filled on the final day of the season, with Dagenham and Redbridge's luck finally giving out as they fell into the sixth tier for the first time since the turn of the century - whilst the Daggers did enjoy a strong late run of form to finish their penultimate game one point ahead of Wealdstone, a failure to win at Solihull Moors saw the Royals narrowly move ahead of them.

==== National League ====
Pos	Team	Pld	W	D	L	GF	GA	GD	Pts	Promotion, qualification or relegation
1	Barnet (C, P)	46	31	9	6	97	38	+59	102	Promotion to EFL League Two
2	York City	46	29	9	8	95	42	+53	96	Qualification for National League play-off semi-finals
3	Forest Green Rovers	46	22	17	7	69	42	+27	83	Qualification for National League play-off semi-finals
4	Rochdale	46	21	11	14	69	44	+25	74	Qualification for the National League play-off quarter-finals
5	Oldham Athletic (O, P)	46	19	16	11	64	48	+16	73	Qualification for the National League play-off quarter-finals
6	FC Halifax Town	46	19	13	14	50	46	+4	70	Qualification for the National League play-off quarter-finals
7	Southend United	46	17	17	12	59	48	+11	68	Qualification for the National League play-off quarter-finals
8	Gateshead	46	19	10	17	76	68	+8	67	
9	Altrincham	46	17	13	16	68	62	+6	64	
10	Tamworth	46	17	13	16	65	72	−7	64	
11	Hartlepool United	46	14	18	14	59	62	−3	60	
12	Sutton United	46	15	15	16	59	64	−5	60	
13	Eastleigh	46	14	17	15	58	61	−3	59	
14	Solihull Moors	46	16	10	20	61	67	−6	58	
15	Woking	46	13	19	14	52	59	−7	58	
16	Aldershot Town	46	14	15	17	69	83	−14	57	
17	Braintree Town	46	15	11	20	51	59	−8	56	
18	Yeovil Town	46	15	11	20	51	60	−9	56	
19	Boston United	46	15	10	21	54	67	−13	55	
20	Wealdstone	46	13	14	19	56	76	−20	53	
21	Dagenham & Redbridge (R)	46	12	16	18	61	62	−1	52	Relegation to National League South
22	Maidenhead United (R)	46	14	10	22	57	75	−18	52	Relegation to National League South
23	AFC Fylde (R)	46	11	7	28	50	85	−35	40	Relegation to National League North
24	Ebbsfleet United (R)	46	3	13	30	38	98	−60	22	Relegation to National League South

Source: National League official site
Rules for classification: 1) Points; 2) Goal difference; 3) Number of goals scored; 4) Number of matches won; 5) Head-to-head results
(C) Champions; (O) Play-off winners; (P) Promoted; (R) Relegated

==== North ====
Pos	Team	Pld	W	D	L	GF	GA	GD	Pts	Promotion, qualification or relegation
1	Brackley Town (C, P)	46	29	5	12	75	42	+33	92	Promotion to National League
2	Scunthorpe United (O, P)	46	26	12	8	76	30	+46	90	Qualification for the National League North play-off semi-finals
3	Kidderminster Harriers	46	27	8	11	86	37	+49	89	Qualification for the National League North play-off semi-finals
4	Chester	46	25	12	9	73	45	+28	87	Qualification for the National League North play-off quarter-finals
5	Chorley	46	22	13	11	76	49	+27	79	Qualification for the National League North play-off quarter-finals
6	King's Lynn Town	46	23	10	13	52	45	+7	79	Qualification for the National League North play-off quarter-finals
7	Buxton	46	24	5	17	76	52	+24	77	Qualification for the National League North play-off quarter-finals
8	Curzon Ashton	46	22	11	13	59	41	+18	77	
9	Spennymoor Town	46	21	13	12	76	50	+26	76	
10	Hereford	46	22	10	14	68	51	+17	76	
11	Darlington	46	18	15	13	61	54	+7	69	
12	Peterborough Sports	46	17	12	17	55	57	−2	63	
13	Scarborough Athletic	46	16	13	17	64	58	+6	61	
14	Alfreton Town	46	15	14	17	54	59	−5	59	
15	Marine	46	16	10	20	45	57	−12	58	
16	Leamington	46	15	10	21	52	56	−4	55	
17	South Shields	46	16	6	24	60	73	−13	54	
18	Southport	46	13	14	19	43	58	−15	53	
19	Oxford City	46	13	14	19	58	74	−16	53	
20	Radcliffe	46	13	12	21	56	75	−19	51	
21	Needham Market (R)	46	10	9	27	44	76	−32	39	Relegation to the Southern League Premier Division Central
22	Rushall Olympic (R)	46	9	8	29	42	98	−56	35	Relegation to the Northern Premier League Premier Division
23	Warrington Town (R)	46	6	13	27	34	70	−36	31	Relegation to the Northern Premier League Premier Division
24	Farsley Celtic (R)	46	7	5	34	35	113	−78	26	Relegation to the Northern Counties East League Premier Division (Note: Farsley Celtic were not granted a FA license to participate in steps 1-4 for 2025-26, thus were relegated to the Northern Counties East League)

Source: National League official site
Rules for classification: 1) Points; 2) Goal difference; 3) Number of goals scored; 4) Number of matches won; 5) Head-to-head results
(C) Champions; (O) Play-off winners; (P) Promoted; (R) Relegated

==== South ====
Pos	Team	Pld	W	D	L	GF	GA	GD	Pts	Promotion, qualification or relegation
1	Truro City (C, P)	46	26	11	9	75	42	+33	89	Promotion to National League
2	Torquay United	46	25	14	7	73	42	+31	89	Qualification for the National League South play-off semi-finals
3	Eastbourne Borough	46	25	13	8	70	43	+27	88	Qualification for the National League South play-off semi-finals
4	Worthing	46	26	10	10	78	58	+20	88	Qualification for the National League South play-off quarter-finals
5	Boreham Wood (O, P)	46	26	8	12	86	48	+38	86	Qualification for the National League South play-off quarter-finals
6	Dorking Wanderers	46	24	14	8	89	54	+35	86	Qualification for the National League South play-off quarter-finals
7	Maidstone United	46	21	16	9	70	38	+32	79	Qualification for the National League South play-off quarter-finals
8	Weston-super-Mare	46	21	12	13	67	54	+13	75	
9	Hornchurch	46	17	14	15	59	54	+5	65	
10	Farnborough	46	18	9	19	69	68	+1	63	
11	Chelmsford City	46	16	14	16	74	62	+12	62	
12	Hemel Hempstead Town	46	17	11	18	64	75	−11	62	
13	Chesham United	46	16	11	19	61	72	−11	59	
14	Chippenham Town	46	17	8	21	57	69	−12	59	
15	Bath City	46	15	12	19	47	48	−1	57	
16	Slough Town	46	15	12	19	70	75	−5	57	
17	Tonbridge Angels	46	15	12	19	51	61	−10	57	
18	Hampton & Richmond Borough	46	14	9	23	60	74	−14	51	
19	Enfield Town	46	13	9	24	49	88	−39	48	
20	Salisbury	46	10	16	20	56	69	−13	46	
21	St Albans City (R)	46	9	18	19	47	64	−17	45	Relegation to the Isthmian League Premier Division
22	Welling United (R)	46	10	8	28	47	91	−44	38	Relegation to the Isthmian League Premier Division
23	Weymouth (R)	46	6	15	25	43	77	−34	33	Relegation to the Southern League Premier Division South
24	Aveley (R)	46	8	8	30	45	81	−36	32	Relegation to the Isthmian League Premier Division

Source: National League official site
Rules for classification: 1) Points; 2) Goal difference; 3) Number of goals scored; 4) Number of matches won; 5) Head-to-head results
(C) Champions; (O) Play-off winners; (P) Promoted; (R) Relegated

=== League play-offs ===
==== Football League play-offs ====
===== EFL Championship =====
====== Final ======
24 May 2025
15:01 BST

Sheffield United	1–2	Sunderland
Campbell 25'	Report	Mayenda 76'; Watson 90+5'

Wembley Stadium, London
Attendance: 82,718
Referee: Chris Kavanagh

===== EFL League One =====
====== Final ======
25 May 2025
13:01 BST

Charlton Athletic	1–0	Leyton Orient
Gillesphey 31'	Report

Wembley Stadium, London
Attendance: 76,193
Referee: Andrew Kitchen

===== EFL League Two =====
====== Final ======
26 May 2025
15:01 BST

AFC Wimbledon	1–0	Walsall
Hippolyte 45+2'	Report

Wembley Stadium, London
Attendance: 50,947
Referee: Will Finnie

==== National League play-offs ====
===== National League =====
====== Final ======
1 June 2025
15:00 BST

Oldham Athletic	3–2 (a.e.t.)	Southend United
Garner 48' (pen.); Norwood 110'; Harratt 112'	Report	Monthé 5' (o.g.); Chambers-Parillon 91'

Wembley Stadium, London
Attendance: 52,115
Referee: Elliot Bell

=== Cup competitions ===
==== FA Cup ====
===== Final =====
17 May 2025
16:30 BST

Crystal Palace	1–0	Manchester City
Eze 16'	Report

Wembley Stadium, London
Attendance: 84,163
Referee: Stuart Attwell (Birmingham)

==== EFL Cup ====
===== Final =====
16 March 2025
16:30 GMT

Liverpool	1–2	Newcastle United
Chiesa 90+4'	Report	Burn 45'; Isak 52'

Wembley Stadium, London
Attendance: 88,513
Referee: John Brooks

==== EFL Trophy ====
===== Final =====
13 April 2025
15:00 BST

Birmingham City	0–2	Peterborough United
	Report	Mills 15'; Kyprianou 45'

Wembley Stadium, London
Attendance: 71,722
Referee: Ben Speedie

==== FA Trophy ====
===== Final =====
11 May 2025
16:15 BST

Aldershot Town	3–0	Spennymoor Town
Barham 48'; Ellison 71'; Barrett 87'	Report

Wembley Stadium, London
Attendance: 38,600
Referee: Lewis Smith (Lancashire)

=== FA Vase ===
==== Final ====
11 May 2025
12:15 BST

AFC Whyteleafe	1–2 (a.e.t.)	Whitstable Town
Bennett 17'	Report	Smith 52'; Sithole 100'

Wembley Stadium, London
Attendance: 38,600
Referee: Ruebyn Ricardo (Leicestershire and Rutland)

==== Community Shield ====
10 August 2024
15:00 BST

Manchester City	1–1	Manchester United
Silva 89'	Report	Garnacho 82'
Penalties
Silva (penalty missed); De Bruyne (penalty scored); Haaland (penalty scored); Savinho (penalty scored); Ederson (penalty scored); Nunes (penalty scored); Dias (penalty scored); Akanji (penalty scored)	7–6	(penalty scored) Fernandes; (penalty scored) Dalot; (penalty scored) Garnacho; (penalty missed) Sancho; (penalty scored) Casemiro; (penalty scored) McTominay; (penalty scored) Martínez; (penalty missed) Evans

Wembley Stadium, London
Attendance: 78,146
Referee: Jarred Gillett

== International competitions ==
=== FIFA Club World Cup ===
==== Group D ====
Pos	Team	Pld	W	D	L	GF	GA	GD	Pts	Qualification
1	(Brazil) Flamengo	3	2	1	0	6	2	+4	7	Advance to knockout stage
2	(England) Chelsea	3	2	0	1	6	3	+3	6	Advance to knockout stage
3	(Tunisia) Espérance de Tunis	3	1	0	2	1	5	−4	3	
4	(United States) Los Angeles FC	3	0	1	2	1	4	−3	1	

Source: FIFA

==== Group G ====
Pos	Team	Pld	W	D	L	GF	GA	GD	Pts	Qualification
1	(England) Manchester City	3	3	0	0	13	2	+11	9	Advance to knockout stage
2	(Italy) Juventus	3	2	0	1	11	6	+5	6	Advance to knockout stage
3	(United Arab Emirates) Al Ain	3	1	0	2	2	12	−10	3	
4	(Morocco) Wydad AC	3	0	0	3	2	8	−6	0	

Source: FIFA

==== Knockout stage ====
===== Round of 16 =====
28 June 2025	Benfica (Portuguese Football Federation)	1–4 (a.e.t.)	(The Football Association) Chelsea	Charlotte, United States
4:00 pm EDT	Di María 90+5' (pen.)	Report	James 64'; Nkunku 108'; Neto 114'; Dewsbury-Hall 117'	Stadium: Bank of America Stadium; Attendance: 25,929; Referee: Slavko Vinčić (Slovenia)

30 June 2025	Manchester City (The Football Association)	3–4 (a.e.t.)	(Saudi Arabian Football Federation) Al-Hilal	Orlando, United States
9:00 pm EDT	Silva 9'; Haaland 55'; Foden 104'	Report	Marcos Leonardo 46', 112'; Malcom 52'; Koulibaly 94'	Stadium: Camping World Stadium; Attendance: 42,311; Referee: Jesús Valenzuela (Venezuela)

== League competitions (Women's) ==
League	Promoted to league ▲	Relegated from league ▼
Super League	Crystal Palace ▲	Bristol City ▼
Championship	Newcastle United ▲; Portsmouth ▲	Lewes ▼; Watford ▼
Premier Division	Hull City ▲; Sporting Khalsa ▲; AFC Wimbledon ▲; Exeter City ▲	Huddersfield Town ▼; AFC Fylde ▼; Chatham Town ▼; London Bees ▼

=== Women's Super League ===
Pos	Team	Pld	W	D	L	GF	GA	GD	Pts	Qualification or relegation
1	Chelsea (C)	22	19	3	0	56	13	+43	60	Qualification for the Champions League league stage (Note: Arsenal qualified for the Champions League league phase as the 2024–25 UEFA Women's Champions League winners.)
2	Arsenal	22	15	3	4	62	26	+36	48	Qualification for the Champions League league stage
3	Manchester United	22	13	5	4	41	16	+25	44	Qualification for the Champions League second qualifying round
4	Manchester City	22	13	4	5	49	28	+21	43	
5	Brighton & Hove Albion	22	8	4	10	35	41	−6	28	
6	Aston Villa	22	7	4	11	32	44	−12	25	
7	Liverpool	22	7	4	11	22	37	−15	25	
8	Everton	22	6	6	10	24	32	−8	24	
9	West Ham United	22	6	5	11	36	41	−5	23	
10	Leicester City	22	5	5	12	21	37	−16	20	
11	Tottenham Hotspur	22	5	5	12	26	44	−18	20	
12	Crystal Palace (R)	22	2	4	16	20	65	−45	10	Relegation to the WSL2

Source: The Football Association
Rules for classification: 1) Points; 2) Goal difference; 3) Number of goals scored.
(C) Champions; (R) Relegated

=== Women's Championship ===
Pos	Team	Pld	W	D	L	GF	GA	GD	Pts	Qualification
1	London City Lionesses (C, P)	20	13	4	3	38	17	+21	43	Promotion to the WSL
2	Birmingham City	20	12	5	3	34	15	+19	41	
3	Charlton Athletic	20	10	7	3	38	21	+17	37	
4	Durham	20	11	3	6	35	27	+8	36	
5	Newcastle United	20	9	7	4	38	24	+14	34	
6	Bristol City	20	8	6	6	34	24	+10	30	
7	Sunderland	20	9	3	8	30	34	−4	30	
8	Southampton	20	5	6	9	22	25	−3	21	
9	Portsmouth	20	3	4	13	16	48	−32	13	
10	Blackburn Rovers (R)	20	3	3	14	16	41	−25	12	Relegated to FA Women's National League Division One North
11	Sheffield United	20	1	4	15	12	37	−25	7	Reprieved from relegation (Note: Sheffield United who were set to be relegated to the FA Women's National League after spending seven seasons in the Championship were reprieved from relegation after Blackburn Rovers withdrew from the league on 20 May 2025.)

Source: https://www.bbc.co.uk/sport/football/womens-super-league-two/table
Rules for classification: 1) Points; 2) Goal difference; 3) Number of goals scored
(C) Champions; (P) Promoted; (R) Relegated

=== Women's National League ===
==== Northern Premier Division ====
Pos	Team	Pld	W	D	L	GF	GA	GD	Pts	Qualification
1	Nottingham Forest (C, P)	22	18	4	0	79	8	+71	58	Promotion to Championship
2	Wolverhampton Wanderers	22	17	4	1	79	21	+58	55	
3	Stoke City	22	16	1	5	66	30	+36	49	
4	Burnley	22	15	1	6	76	19	+57	46	
5	Rugby Borough	22	12	6	4	57	20	+37	42	
6	Liverpool Feds	22	10	2	10	35	53	−18	32	
7	West Bromwich Albion	22	7	1	14	31	52	−21	22	
8	Hull City	22	6	4	12	27	55	−28	22	
9	Derby County	22	6	3	13	27	45	−18	21	
10	Sporting Khalsa	22	6	3	13	34	62	−28	21	
11	Halifax	22	2	1	19	13	86	−73	7	
12	Stourbridge (R)	22	2	0	20	14	87	−73	5 (Note: Stourbridge were deducted 1 point for failing to fulfil their fixture against Nottingham Forest on 2 March 2025. Subsequently, Stourbridge received a £250 fine and the fixture was rescheduled.)	Relegation to FA WNL Division One

Source: The Football Association
Rules for classification: 1) Points; 2) Goal difference; 3) Number of goals scored
(C) Champions; (P) Promoted; (R) Relegated

==== Southern Premier Division ====
Pos	Team	Pld	W	D	L	GF	GA	GD	Pts	Qualification
1	Ipswich Town (C, P)	22	17	3	2	89	10	+79	54	Promotion to Championship
2	Hashtag United	22	15	3	4	49	16	+33	48	
3	Watford	22	13	5	4	57	17	+40	44	
4	Exeter City	22	13	4	5	50	29	+21	43	
5	Oxford United	22	13	3	6	38	18	+20	42	
6	Lewes	22	8	7	7	37	28	+9	31	
7	AFC Wimbledon	22	9	4	9	32	28	+4	31	
8	Cheltenham Town	22	7	2	13	32	47	−15	23	
9	Gwalia United	22	5	4	13	20	38	−18	22 (Note: Billericay Town were deducted three points for fielding an ineligible player in their FA WNL Southern Premier Division away fixture against Gwalia United on Sunday 17 November, which they won 1–0. Consequently, Billericay Town were imposed a fine of £100 and the three points for the match were transferred to Gwalia United.)	
10	Plymouth Argyle	22	6	2	14	25	53	−28	20	
11	Billericay Town	22	6	2	14	25	56	−31	17	
12	Milton Keynes Dons (R)	22	0	1	21	10	124	−114	1	Relegation to FA WNL Division One

Source: The Football Association
Rules for classification: 1) Points; 2) Goal difference; 3) Number of goals scored
(C) Champions; (P) Promoted; (R) Relegated

==== Division One North ====
Pos	Team	Pld	W	D	L	GF	GA	GD	Pts	Qualification
1	Middlesbrough (C, P)	22	15	6	1	45	13	+32	51	Promotion to FA WNL Premier Division
2	Cheadle Town Stingers	22	16	3	3	38	11	+27	51	
3	Chorley	22	13	4	5	47	30	+17	43	
4	Leeds United	22	13	2	7	53	32	+21	41	
5	Huddersfield Town	22	10	6	6	31	24	+7	36	
6	Durham Cestria	22	7	4	11	42	43	−1	25	
7	Stockport County	22	7	4	11	28	37	−9	25	
8	Barnsley F.C.	22	6	5	11	32	43	−11	23	
9	Norton & Stockton Ancients	22	6	5	11	30	43	−13	23	
10	York City	22	6	3	13	29	54	−25	21	
11	Doncaster Rovers Belles	22	4	5	13	34	54	−20	17	
12	AFC Fylde (R)	22	3	5	14	21	46	−25	14	Relegation to regional league level

Source: The Football Association
Rules for classification: 1) Points; 2) Goal difference; 3) Number of goals scored
(C) Champions; (P) Promoted; (R) Relegated

==== Division One Midlands ====
Pos	Team	Pld	W	D	L	GF	GA	GD	Pts	Qualification
1	Loughborough Lightning (C, P)	22	19	3	0	85	10	+75	60	Promotion to FA WNL Premier Division
2	Northampton Town	22	17	1	4	78	22	+56	52	
3	Peterborough United	22	16	3	3	62	21	+41	51	
4	Leafield Athletic	22	16	0	6	59	22	+37	48	
5	Boldmere St. Michaels	22	13	1	8	51	26	+25	40	
6	Barnsley Women's	22	10	3	9	45	36	+9	33	
7	Notts County	22	10	2	10	43	53	−10	32	
8	Sutton Coldfield Town	22	8	1	13	35	46	−11	25	
9	Lincoln United	22	7	1	14	28	61	−33	22	
10	Worcester City	22	3	4	15	31	56	−25	13	
11	Solihull Moors (R)	22	1	4	17	14	66	−52	6 (Note: On 13 November 2024, Solihull Moors were deducted 1 point for failing to fulfil their fixture against Loughborough Lightning. As a result, Solihull received a suspended £250 fine and the game was rescheduled.)	Relegation to regional league level
12	Lincoln City (R)	22	0	1	21	5	117	−112	1	Relegation to regional league level

Source: The Football Association
Rules for classification: 1) Points; 2) Goal difference; 3) Number of goals scored
(C) Champions; (P) Promoted; (R) Relegated

==== Division One South East ====
Pos	Team	Pld	W	D	L	GF	GA	GD	Pts	Qualification
1	Real Bedford (C, P)	22	14	7	1	66	15	+51	49	Promotion to FA WNL Premier Division
2	Norwich City	22	14	5	3	50	17	+33	47	
3	Chatham Town	22	12	7	3	48	14	+34	43	
4	London Bees	22	12	5	5	59	31	+28	41	
5	Queens Park Rangers	22	10	6	6	37	29	+8	36	
6	Actonians	22	10	4	8	40	24	+16	34	
7	AFC Sudbury	22	9	7	6	40	34	+6	34	
8	Dulwich Hamlet	22	8	5	9	36	28	+8	29	
9	Cambridge United	22	7	4	11	37	40	−3	25	
10	Chesham United	22	5	3	14	27	76	−49	18	
11	Ashford Town (R)	22	2	2	18	24	83	−59	8	Relegation to regional league level
12	London Seaward (R)	22	1	1	20	10	83	−73	4	Relegation to regional league level

Source: The Football Association
Rules for classification: 1) Points; 2) Goal difference; 3) Number of goals scored
(C) Champions; (P) Promoted; (R) Relegated

==== Division One South West ====
Pos	Team	Pld	W	D	L	GF	GA	GD	Pts	Qualification
1	AFC Bournemouth (C, P)	22	21	1	0	100	7	+93	64	Promotion to FA WNL Premier Division
2	Moneyfields	22	15	3	4	63	25	+38	48	
3	Swindon Town	22	13	5	4	63	26	+37	44	
4	Bristol Rovers	22	14	1	7	40	25	+15	43	
5	Worthing	22	12	2	8	51	41	+10	38	
6	Keynsham Town	22	10	2	10	37	41	−4	32	
7	Bridgwater United	22	8	3	11	31	42	−11	27	
8	Maidenhead United	22	7	2	13	27	48	−21	23	
9	Abingdon United	22	6	3	13	31	42	−11	21	
10	Bournemouth Sports	22	5	5	12	19	49	−30	20	
11	Portishead Town	22	3	4	15	19	60	−41	13	
12	Southampton Women's (R)	22	2	1	19	10	85	−75	6 (Note: On 10 October 2024, Southampton Women's were deducted 1 point for failing to fulfil their fixture against Bristol Rovers on 25 August 2024. As a result, Southampton received a suspended £250 fine and the game was rescheduled.)	Relegation to regional league level

Source: The Football Association
Rules for classification: 1) Points; 2) Goal difference; 3) Number of goals scored
(C) Champions; (P) Promoted; (R) Relegated

== Cup competitions (Women's) ==
=== Women's FA Cup ===
==== Women's FA Cup ====
===== Final =====
18 May 2025
13:30 BST

Chelsea	3–0	Manchester United
Baltimore 45' (pen.), 90+1'; Macario 84'	Report

Wembley Stadium, London
Attendance: 74,412
Referee: Stacey Fullicks (Northamptonshire)

=== FA Women's League Cup ===
==== Final ====
15 March 2025
12:15 GMT

Chelsea	2–1	Manchester City
Ramírez 8'; Hasegawa 77' (o.g.)	Report	Fujino 64'

Pride Park Stadium, Derby
Attendance: 14,187
Referee: Emily Heaslip

== Managerial changes ==
Team	Outgoing manager	Manner of departure	Date of departure	Position in table	Incoming manager	Date of appointment
Swindon Town	(Republic of Ireland) Gavin Gunning	End of interim spell	27 April 2024	Pre-season	(Republic of Ireland) Mark Kennedy	29 May 2024
Gillingham	(England) Stephen Clemence	Sacked	29 April 2024	Pre-season	(England) Mark Bonner	7 May 2024
Morecambe	(England) Ged Brannan	Signed by Accrington Stanley as assistant head coach	30 April 2024	Pre-season	(Scotland) Derek Adams	3 June 2024
Plymouth Argyle	(England) Neil Dewsnip	End of interim spell	4 May 2024	Pre-season	(England) Wayne Rooney	25 May 2024
Sunderland	(England) Mike Dodds	End of interim spell	4 May 2024	Pre-season	(France) Régis Le Bris	22 June 2024
Barnsley	(Republic of Ireland) Martin Devaney	End of interim spell	7 May 2024	Pre-season	(England) Darrell Clarke	23 May 2024
Birmingham City	(England) Gary Rowett	End of interim spell	7 May 2024	Pre-season	(England) Tony Mowbray	7 May 2024
Hull City	(England) Liam Rosenior	Sacked	7 May 2024	Pre-season	(Germany) Tim Walter	31 May 2024
Huddersfield Town	(Germany) André Breitenreiter	Mutual consent	10 May 2024	Pre-season	(Northern Ireland) Michael Duff	13 May 2024
Norwich City	(United States) David Wagner	Sacked	17 May 2024	Pre-season	(Denmark) Johannes Hoff Thorup	30 May 2024
Liverpool	(German Football Association) Jürgen Klopp	Resigned	19 May 2024	Pre-season	(Netherlands national football team) Arne Slot	1 June 2024
West Ham United	(Scotland) David Moyes	End of contract	19 May 2024	Pre-season	(Spain) Julen Lopetegui	23 May 2024
Brighton & Hove Albion	(Italy) Roberto De Zerbi	Mutual consent	19 May 2024	Pre-season	(Germany) Fabian Hürzeler	15 June 2024
Birmingham City	(England) Tony Mowbray	Resigned	21 May 2024	Pre-season	(Wales) Chris Davies	6 June 2024
Chelsea	(Argentina) Mauricio Pochettino	Mutual consent	21 May 2024	Pre-season	(Italy) Enzo Maresca	1 July 2024
Cheltenham Town	(England) Darrell Clarke	Signed by Barnsley	23 May 2024	Pre-season	(Wales) Michael Flynn	31 May 2024
Barrow	(England) Pete Wild	Mutual consent	24 May 2024	Pre-season	(England) Stephen Clemence	31 May 2024
Burton Albion	(Northern Ireland) Martin Paterson	End of contract	24 May 2024	Pre-season	(England) Mark Robinson	4 June 2024
Burnley	(Belgium) Vincent Kompany	Signed by Bayern Munich	29 May 2024	Pre-season	(England) Scott Parker	5 July 2024
Leicester City	(Italy) Enzo Maresca	Signed by Chelsea	3 June 2024	Pre-season	(Wales) Steve Cooper	20 June 2024
Newport County	(Republic of Ireland) Graham Coughlan	Mutual consent	20 June 2024	Pre-season	(Portugal) Nelson Jardim	16 July 2024
Preston North End	(England) Ryan Lowe	Mutual consent	12 August 2024	23rd	(England) Paul Heckingbottom	20 August 2024
Blackpool	(England) Neil Critchley	Sacked	21 August 2024	23rd	(England) Steve Bruce	3 September 2024
Carlisle United	(England) Paul Simpson	Sacked	31 August 2024	20th	(England) Mike Williamson	19 September 2024
Stoke City	(England) Steven Schumacher	Sacked	16 September 2024	13th	(Spain) Narcís Pèlach	18 September 2024
Milton Keynes Dons	(England) Mike Williamson	Signed by Carlisle United	19 September 2024	20th	(England) Scott Lindsey	25 September 2024
Cardiff City	(Turkey) Erol Bulut	Sacked	22 September 2024	24th	(Turkey) Omer Riza (Note: Riza was initially appointed interim manager before being permanently appointed on 5 December 2024)	22 September 2024
Crawley Town	(England) Scott Lindsey	Signed by Milton Keynes Dons	25 September 2024	18th	(Republic of Ireland) Rob Elliot	1 October 2024
Burton Albion	(England) Mark Robinson	Sacked	23 October 2024	24th	(England) Gary Bowyer	18 December 2024
Swindon Town	(Republic of Ireland) Mark Kennedy	Sacked	25 October 2024	22nd	(England) Ian Holloway	25 October 2024
Manchester United	(Netherlands) Erik ten Hag	Sacked	28 October 2024	14th	(Portugal) Ruben Amorim	11 November 2024
Shrewsbury Town	(England) Paul Hurst	Sacked	3 November 2024	23rd	(England) Gareth Ainsworth	13 November 2024
Coventry City	(England) Mark Robins	Sacked	7 November 2024	17th	(England) Frank Lampard	28 November 2024
Leicester City	(Wales) Steve Cooper	Sacked	24 November 2024	16th	(Netherlands) Ruud van Nistelrooy	29 November 2024
Hull City	(Germany) Tim Walter	Sacked	27 November 2024	22nd	(Spain) Rubén Sellés	6 December 2024
Northampton Town	(Australia) Jon Brady	Resigned	5 December 2024	21st	(England) Kevin Nolan	23 December 2024
Reading	(Spain) Rubén Sellés	Signed by Hull City	6 December 2024	6th	(Republic of Ireland) Noel Hunt	6 December 2024
Millwall	(England) Neil Harris	Mutual consent	15 December 2024	13th	(Scotland) Alex Neil	30 December 2024
Wolverhampton Wanderers	(England) Gary O'Neil	Sacked	15 December 2024	19th	(Portugal) Vítor Pereira	19 December 2024
Oxford United	(England) Des Buckingham	Sacked	15 December 2024	20th	(England) Gary Rowett	20 December 2024
Southampton	(Scotland) Russell Martin	Sacked	15 December 2024	20th	(Croatia) Ivan Jurić	21 December 2024
Bristol Rovers	(England) Matt Taylor	Sacked	16 December 2024	20th	(Spain) Iñigo Calderón	26 December 2024
Fleetwood Town	(Scotland) Charlie Adam	Sacked	22 December 2024	18th	(England) Pete Wild	24 December 2024
West Bromwich Albion	(Spain) Carlos Corberán	Signed by Valencia	25 December 2024	7th	(England) Tony Mowbray	17 January 2025
Stoke City	(Spain) Narcís Pèlach	Sacked	27 December 2024	19th	(England) Mark Robins	1 January 2025
Plymouth Argyle	(England) Wayne Rooney	Mutual consent	31 December 2024	24th	(Austria) Miron Muslic	11 January 2025
Gillingham	(England) Mark Bonner	Sacked	5 January 2025	14th	(England) John Coleman	5 January 2025
West Ham United	(Spain) Julen Lopetegui	Sacked	8 January 2025	14th	(England) Graham Potter	9 January 2025
Luton Town	(Wales) Rob Edwards	Mutual consent	9 January 2025	20th	(England) Matt Bloomfield	14 January 2025
Everton	(England) Sean Dyche	Sacked	9 January 2025	16th	(Scotland) David Moyes	11 January 2025
Wycombe Wanderers	(England) Matt Bloomfield	Signed by Luton Town	14 January 2025	2nd	(England) Mike Dodds	2 February 2025
Barrow	(England) Stephen Clemence	Sacked	18 January 2025	17th	(England) Andy Whing	20 January 2025
Bolton Wanderers	(England) Ian Evatt	Sacked	22 January 2025	9th	(England) Steven Schumacher	30 January 2025
Carlisle United	(England) Mike Williamson	Sacked	3 February 2025	24th	(Wales) Mark Hughes	6 February 2025
Derby County	(England) Paul Warne	Sacked	7 February 2025	22nd	(England) John Eustace	13 February 2025
Blackburn Rovers	(England) John Eustace	Signed by Derby County	13 February 2025	5th	(France) Valérien Ismaël	25 February 2025
Cambridge United	(England) Garry Monk	Sacked	16 February 2025	24th	(England) Neil Harris	19 February 2025
Swansea City	(England) Luke Williams	Sacked	17 February 2025	17th	(Republic of Ireland) Alan Sheehan (Note: Sheehan was initially appointed interim head coach before being appointed permanently on 30 April 2025.)	17 February 2025
Tranmere Rovers	(England) Nigel Adkins	Mutual agreement	26 February 2025	22nd	(England) Andy Crosby (Note: Crosby was initially appointed interim manager before being appointed permanently on 14 May 2025.)	26 February 2025
Wigan Athletic	(Scotland) Shaun Maloney	Sacked	2 March 2025	15th	(England) Ryan Lowe	12 March 2025
Milton Keynes Dons	(England) Scott Lindsey	Sacked	2 March 2025	17th	(England) Paul Warne	15 April 2025
Huddersfield Town	(Northern Ireland) Michael Duff	Sacked	9 March 2025	7th	(England) Jon Worthington (interim)	9 March 2025
Barnsley	(England) Darrell Clarke	Sacked	12 March 2025	10th	(Republic of Ireland) Conor Hourihane (Note: Hourihane was initially appointed interim head coach before being permanently appointed on 18 April 2025.)	12 March 2025
Crawley Town	(Republic of Ireland) Rob Elliot	Sacked	19 March 2025	22nd	(England) Scott Lindsey	21 March 2025
Gillingham	(England) John Coleman	Sacked	25 March 2025	19th	(England) Gareth Ainsworth	25 March 2025
Shrewsbury Town	(England) Gareth Ainsworth	Signed by Gillingham	25 March 2025	24th	(England) Michael Appleton	26 March 2025
Rotherham United	(Scotland) Steve Evans	Sacked	30 March 2025	16th	(England) Matt Hamshaw (Note: Hamshaw was initially appointed interim manager before being permanently appointed on 15 April 2025.)	30 March 2025
Southampton	(Croatia) Ivan Jurić	Mutual consent	7 April 2025	20th	(England) Simon Rusk (interim)	7 April 2025
Cardiff City	(Turkey) Omer Riza	Sacked	19 April 2025	23rd	(Wales) Aaron Ramsey (caretaker)	19 April 2025
West Bromwich Albion	(England) Tony Mowbray	Sacked	21 April 2025	10th	(Scotland) James Morrison (interim)	21 April 2025
Norwich City	(Denmark) Johannes Hoff Thorup	Sacked	22 April 2025	14th	(England) Jack Wilshere (caretaker)	22 April 2025
Newport County	(Portugal) Nelson Jardim	Mutual consent	24 April 2025	20th	(Wales) Dafydd Williams (interim)	25 April 2025

== Deaths ==
- 6 June 2024: Glan Letheren, 68, Leeds United, Chesterfield and Swansea City goalkeeper.
- 10 June 2024: Terry Allcock, 88, Bolton Wanderers and Norwich City forward.
- 10 June 2024: Willie Carlin, 83, Liverpool, Halifax Town, Carlisle United, Sheffield United, Derby County, Leicester City, Notts County and Cardiff City midfielder.
- 11 June 2024: Barry Butler, 62, Chester City midfielder/defender.
- 13 June 2024: Tommy Banks, 94, England and Bolton Wanderers defender.
- 13 June 2024: Mick Gannon, 81, Everton, Scunthorpe United and Crewe Alexandra defender.
- 15 June 2024: Kevin Campbell, 54, Arsenal, Nottingham Forest, Everton, West Bromwich Albion and Cardiff City forward.
- 15 June 2024: Frank D'Arcy, 77, Everton and Tranmere Rovers defender.
- 15 June 2024: John McClelland, 89, Manchester City, Lincoln City, Queens Park Rangers, Portsmouth and Newport County outside right.
- 15 June 2024: Matija Sarkic, 26, Montenegro, Wolverhampton Wanderers and Millwall goalkeeper.
- 17 June 2024: Brian Makepeace, 92, Doncaster Rovers defender.
- 19 June 2024: Roy Ironside, 89, Rotherham United and Barnsley goalkeeper.
- 20 June 2024: Andy Rowland, 69, Bury and Swindon Town forward/defender.
- 23 June 2024: Bobby Tebbutt, 89, Northampton Town forward.
- 24 June 2024: Len Roe, 92, Brentford wing half.
- 2 July 2024: Jeff Whitefoot, 90, Manchester United, Grimsby Town and Nottingham Forest wing half.
- 4 July 2024: Dudley Roberts, 78, Coventry City, Mansfield Town and Scunthorpe United forward.
- 15 July 2024: Ken Jenkin, 92, Grimsby Town midfielder.
- 19 July 2024: Ron Stockin, 93, Walsall, Wolverhampton Wanderers, Cardiff City and Grimsby Town inside forward.
- 23 July 2024: Fred Potter, 83, Aston Villa, Doncaster Rovers and Hereford United goalkeeper.
- 30 July 2024: Tommy Clish, 91, Darlington goalkeeper.
- 1 August 2024: Tommy Cassidy, 73, Northern Ireland, Newcastle United and Burnley midfielder.
- 1 August 2024: Craig Shakespeare, 60, Walsall, Sheffield Wednesday, West Bromwich Albion, Grimsby Town and Scunthorpe United midfielder, who also managed Leicester City.
- 5 August 2024: George Herd, 88, Scotland, Sunderland and Hartlepool United inside forward.
- 6 August 2024: Bobby Thomson, 87, Wolverhampton Wanderers, Aston Villa, Birmingham City and Stockport County forward.
- 8 August 2024: Alan Little, 69, Aston Villa, Southend United, Barnsley, Doncaster Rovers, Torquay United, Halifax Town and Hartlepool United midfielder, who also managed York City, Southend United and Halifax Town.
- 10 August 2024: Liam Munroe, 90, Republic of Ireland and Bristol City forward.
- 11 August 2024: Alan Kell, 75, Darlington wing half.
- 12 August 2024: Roy Greaves, 77, Bolton Wanderers and Rochdale midfielder/forward.
- 15 August 2024: Jim McLaughlin, 83, Northern Ireland, Shrewsbury Town, Swansea City and Peterborough United forward.
- 22 August 2024: Granville Smith, 87, Newport County and Bristol Rovers midfielder.
- 22 August 2024: Rodney Smithson, 80, Arsenal and Oxford United defender.
- 26 August 2024: Sven-Göran Eriksson, 76, England, Manchester City and Leicester City manager.
- 29 August 2024: Derek Draper, 81, Swansea Town, Derby County, Bradford Park Avenue and Chester forward/midfielder.
- 31 August 2024: Sol Bamba, 39, Ivory Coast, Leicester City, Leeds United, Cardiff City and Middlesbrough defender.
- 2 September 2024: Mick Cullen, 93, Scotland, Luton Town, Grimsby Town and Derby County midfielder.
- 3 September 2024: Clive Freeman, 61, Swansea City and Doncaster Rovers defender/midfielder.
- 5 September 2024: Bob Massey, 84, Bournemouth & Boscombe Athletic defender.
- 6 September 2024: Ron Yeats, 86, Scotland, Liverpool and Tranmere Rovers defender, who also managed Tranmere Rovers.
- 16 September 2024: Steve Hardwick, 68, Chesterfield, Newcastle United, Oxford United and Huddersfield Town goalkeeper.
- 16 September 2024: Gary Shaw, 63, Aston Villa, Walsall and Shrewsbury Town forward.
- 27 September 2024: Fabián Caballero, 46, Arsenal forward.
- c. 28 September 2024: Barry Lloyd, 75, Chelsea, Fulham, Hereford United and Brentford midfielder, who also managed Brighton & Hove Albion.
- c. 9 October 2024: George Baldock, 31, Greece, Milton Keynes Dons and Sheffield United defender.
- 10 October 2024: Peter Cormack, 78, Scotland, Nottingham Forest, Liverpool and Bristol City midfielder.
- 31 October 2024: Trevor Whymark, 74, England, Ipswich Town, Derby County, Grimsby Town, Southend United, Peterborough United and Colchester United forward.
- 2 November 2024: Len Green, 88, Darlington defender.
- 6 November 2024: John Dempsey, 78, Republic of Ireland, Fulham and Chelsea defender.
- 15 November 2024: Graham Bailey, 104, Huddersfield Town and Sheffield United defender.
- 21 November 2024: Ray Smith, 90, Hull City, Peterborough United, Northampton Town and Luton Town inside forward.
- 22 November 2024: Norman Bodell, 86, Rochdale, Crewe Alexandra and Halifax Town defender, who also managed Barrow.
- c. 28 November 2024: John McNamee, 83, Newcastle United, Blackburn Rovers and Hartlepool United defender.
- 4 December 2024: John Docherty, 84, Brentford, Sheffield United and Reading midfielder, who also managed Brentford, Cambridge United, Millwall and Bradford City.
- 4 December 2024: Roly Horrey, 81, Blackburn Rovers, York City and Cambridge United midfielder.
- 4 December 2024: Tony Young, 71, Manchester United, Charlton Athletic and York City defender.
- 7 December 2024: Ray Holt, 85, Huddersfield Town, Oldham Athletic, Halifax Town and Scunthorpe United defender.
- c. 12 December 2024: Vic Gomersall, 82, Manchester City and Swansea City defender.
- 18 December 2024: Tony Bentley, 84, Stoke City and Southend United defender/forward.
- 20 December 2024: George Eastham OBE, 88, England, Newcastle United, Arsenal and Stoke City midfielder/forward, who also managed Stoke City.
- 27 December 2024: Mickey Bullock, 78, Birmingham City, Oxford United, Leyton Orient and Halifax Town forward, who also managed Halifax Town.
- 28 December 2024: Tony Rhodes, 78, Derby County, Halifax Town and Southport defender.
- 28 December 2024: Charlie Wright, 86, Workington, Grimsby Town, Charlton Athletic and Bolton Wanderers goalkeeper, who also managed York City and Bolton Wanderers.
- 30 December 2024: Cecil Steeds, 95, Bristol City and Bristol Rovers inside forward.
- December 2024: Colin Harrington, 81, Oxford United and Mansfield Town midfielder.
- 8 January 2025: Brian Usher, 80, Sunderland, Sheffield Wednesday and Doncaster Rovers midfielder.
- 11 January 2025: Bobby Kennedy, 87, Manchester City and Grimsby Town defender/midfielder, who also managed Grimsby Town and Bradford City.
- 13 January 2025: Tony Book, 90, Plymouth Argyle and Manchester City defender, who also managed Manchester City and held various coaching roles at the club.
- 17 January 2025: Denis Law CBE, 84, Scotland, Huddersfield Town, Manchester City and Manchester United forward.
- 18 January 2025: Garry Brooke, 64, Tottenham Hotspur, Norwich City, Wimbledon, Brentford and Reading midfielder.
- 19 January 2025: Jimmy Calderwood, 69, Birmingham City midfielder.
- 24 January 2025: David Gaskell, 84, Manchester United and Wrexham goalkeeper.
- 29 January 2025: Barry Hartle, 85, Watford, Sheffield United, Carlisle United, Stockport County, Oldham Athletic and Southport inside/outside left.
- 2 February 2025: Alan Shoulder, 71, Newcastle United, Carlisle United and Hartlepool United forward.
- c. 6 February 2025: Gordon Marshall, 85, Newcastle United and Nottingham Forest goalkeeper.
- 6 February 2025: Ernie Walley, 91, Tottenham Hotspur and Middlesbrough wing half.
- 7 February 2025: Mick Walker, 84, Notts County manager.
- 9 February 2025: George Davies, 97, Sheffield Wednesday and Chester wing half.
- 10 February 2025: John Tudor, 78, Coventry City, Sheffield United, Newcastle United and Stoke City forward.
- c. 11 February 2025: Paul Round, 65, Blackburn Rovers defender.
- 12 February 2025: Tony Bedeau, 45, Grenada, Torquay United and Walsall forward.
- 12 February 2025: Ronnie Boyce, 82, West Ham United midfielder.
- 19 February 2025: Hughen Riley, 77, Rochdale, Crewe Alexandra, Bury and AFC Bournemouth midfielder.
- 20 February 2025: Evan Williams, 81, Wolverhampton Wanderers goalkeeper.
- 2 March 2025: Ray De Gruchy, 92, Grimsby Town and Chesterfield defender.
- 3 March 2025: Dennis Bond, 77, Watford, Tottenham Hotspur and Charlton Athletic midfielder.
- 8 March 2025: Ray Snowball, 92, Darlington goalkeeper.
- c. 12 March 2025: Steve Fleet, 87, Manchester City, Wrexham and Stockport County goalkeeper.
- 15 March 2025: Mike Kenning, 84, Aston Villa, Shrewsbury Town, Charlton Athletic, Norwich City, Wolverhampton Wanderers and Watford midfielder.
- 16 March 2025: Jon Durham, 59, Rotherham United and Torquay United forward
- 16 March 2025: Don Kitchenbrand, 91, Sunderland forward.
- 24 March 2025: Roy Wilkinson, 83, Bolton Wanderers midfielder.
- 2 April 2025: Johnny King, 92, Crewe Alexandra, Stoke City and Cardiff City forward.
- 3 April 2025: Andy Wharton, 63, Burnley and Chester City defender.
- c. 11 April 2025: Paul Petts, 63, Bristol Rovers and Shrewsbury Town midfielder.
- 14 April 2025: Carlton Fairweather, 63, Wimbledon and Carlisle United midfielder.
- 17 April 2025: Joe Thompson, 36, Rochdale, Tranmere Rovers, Bury and Carlisle United midfielder.
- 18 April 2025: Mick McGrath, 89, Republic of Ireland, Blackburn Rovers and Bradford Park Avenue left half.
- 21 April 2025: Cecil Irwin, 83, Sunderland defender.
- 23 April 2025: Jim Herriot, 85, Scotland and Birmingham City goalkeeper.
- 27 April 2025: Ken Hancock, 87, Port Vale, Ipswich Town, Tottenham Hotspur and Bury goalkeeper.
- 30 April 2025: Peter Burridge, 91, Leyton Orient, Millwall, Crystal Palace and Charlton Athletic forward.
- 1 May 2025: David Woodfield, 81, Wolverhampton Wanderers and Watford defender.
- 3 May 2025: Jake Findlay, 70, Aston Villa, Luton Town and Swindon Town goalkeeper.
- 3 May 2025: Steve Uzelac, 72, Doncaster Rovers, Preston North End and Stockport County defender.
- 4 May 2025: Peter McParland, 91, Northern Ireland, Aston Villa, Wolverhampton Wanderers and Plymouth Argyle outside left.
- 4 May 2025: Tom Youngs, 45, Cambridge United, Northampton Town, Leyton Orient and Bury forward.
- 7 May 2025: Chris Rabjohn, 80, Rotherham United and Doncaster Rovers midfielder.
- 10 May 2025: Gerry Francis, 91, Leeds United and York City midfielder.
- 12 May 2025: Per Bartram, 81, Denmark and Crystal Palace forward.
- 12 May 2025: Colin Booth, 90, Wolverhampton Wanderers, Nottingham Forest, Doncaster Rovers and Oxford United forward.
- 13 May 2025: Gerry Fell, 74, Brighton & Hove Albion, Southend United and Torquay United midfielder.
- c. 14 May 2025: Chic Bates, 75, Shrewsbury Town, Swindon Town and Bristol Rovers forward, who also managed Shrewsbury Town and Stoke City.
- 19 May 2025: Alec Farrall, 89, Everton, Preston North End, Gillingham, Lincoln City and Watford midfielder.
- 24 May 2025: Gary Pierce, 74, Huddersfield Town, Wolverhampton Wanderers, Barnsley and Blackpool goalkeeper.
- 25 May 2025: Bill Asprey, 88, Stoke City, Oldham Athletic and Port Vale defender, who also managed Oxford United and Stoke City.
- 26 May 2025: Grenville Millington, 73, Chester City and Wrexham goalkeeper.
- 27 May 2025: Willie Stevenson, 85, Liverpool, Stoke City and Tranmere Rovers left half.
- 28 May 2025: Graeme Crawford, 77, Sheffield United, York City, Scunthorpe United and Rochdale goalkeeper.

== Retirements ==
- 3 June 2024: Felipe, 35, former Brazil and Nottingham Forest defender.
- 10 June 2024: David Marshall, 39, former Scotland, Norwich City, Cardiff City, Hull City, Wigan Athletic, Derby County and Queens Park Rangers goalkeeper.
- 11 June 2024: Stephen McGinn, 35, former Watford, Sheffield United and Wycombe Wanderers midfielder.
- 15 June 2024: Paul Anderson, 35, former Nottingham Forest, Bristol City, Ipswich Town, Bradford City, Northampton Town, Mansfield Town and Plymouth Argyle midfielder.
- 18 June 2024: Ryan Bertrand, 34, former England, Great Britain Olympic, Chelsea, Southampton and Leicester City defender.
- 18 June 2024: Scott Loach, 36, former Watford, Ipswich Town, Rotherham United, Notts County and Derby County goalkeeper.
- 22 June 2024: Michael Liddle, 34, former Carlisle United, Leyton Orient and Accrington Stanley defender.
- 25 June 2024: Luke Daniels, 36, former West Bromwich Albion, Scunthorpe United, Brentford, Middlesbrough and Forest Green Rovers goalkeeper.
- 25 June 2024: Shkodran Mustafi, 32, former Germany, Everton and Arsenal defender.
- 27 June 2024: Jamie Proctor, 32, former Preston North End, Crawley Town, Fleetwood Town, Bradford City, Bolton Wanderers, Rotherham United, Port Vale and Barrow forward.
- 2 July 2024: Tom Huddlestone, 37, former England, Derby County, Tottenham Hotspur and Hull City midfielder.
- 3 July 2024: John Brayford, 36, former Crewe Alexandra, Derby County, Cardiff City, Sheffield United and Burton Albion defender.
- 5 July 2024: Ben Gladwin, 32, former Swindon Town, Queens Park Rangers, Blackburn Rovers, Milton Keynes Dons and Crawley Town midfielder.
- 7 July 2024: Thiago Alcântara, 33, former Spain and Liverpool midfielder.
- 11 July 2024: Anthony Knockaert, 32, former Leicester City, Brighton & Hove Albion and Fulham midfielder.
- 11 July 2024: Richard Stearman, 36, former Leicester City, Wolverhampton Wanderers, Fulham, Sheffield United, Huddersfield Town and Derby County defender.
- 16 July 2024: Jonny Hayes, 37, former Republic of Ireland and Leicester City midfielder.
- 21 July 2024: Alex Fletcher, 25, former Plymouth Argyle forward.
- 24 July 2024: Joost van Aken, 30, former Sheffield Wednesday defender.
- 1 August 2024: Curtis Davies, 39, former Sierra Leone, Luton Town, West Bromwich Albion, Aston Villa, Birmingham City, Hull City, Derby County and Cheltenham Town defender.
- 3 August 2024: Caolan Lavery, 31, former Sheffield Wednesday, Sheffield United, Walsall, Bradford City and Doncaster Rovers forward.
- 16 August 2024: Elliott Bennett, 35, former Wolverhampton Wanderers, Brighton & Hove Albion, Norwich City, Blackburn Rovers and Shrewsbury Town midfielder/defender.
- 16 August 2024: Morgan Schneiderlin, 34, former France, Southampton, Manchester United and Everton midfielder.
- 17 August 2024: Phil Jones, 32, former England, Blackburn Rovers and Manchester United defender/midfielder.
- 19 August 2024: Matt Smith, 35, former Oldham Athletic, Macclesfield Town, Leeds United, Fulham, Bristol City, Queens Park Rangers, Millwall and Salford City forward.
- 25 August 2024: Liam Moore, 31, former Jamaica, Leicester City, Reading and Northampton Town defender.
- 28 August 2024: Chris Basham, 36, former Bolton Wanderers, Blackpool and Sheffield United midfielder/defender.
- 29 August 2024: Bartosz Białkowski, 37, former Poland, Southampton, Notts County, Ipswich Town and Millwall goalkeeper.
- 13 September 2024: Harrison Dunk, 33, former Cambridge United defender/midfielder.
- 25 September 2024: Raphaël Varane, 31, former France and Manchester United defender.
- 26 September 2024: Zoran Tošić, 37, former Serbia and Manchester United midfielder.
- 1 October 2024: Jason Kennedy, 38, former Middlesbrough, Darlington, Rochdale, Bradford City and Carlisle United midfielder.
- 2 October 2024: Liam Feeney, 37, former AFC Bournemouth, Millwall, Bolton Wanderers, Blackburn Rovers, Blackpool, Tranmere Rovers and Scunthorpe United midfielder.
- 2 October 2024: Vladimír Weiss, 34, former Slovakia and Manchester City midfielder.
- 5 October 2024: Kelvin Langmead, 39, former Preston North End, Shrewsbury Town, Peterborough United and Northampton Town defender.
- 11 October 2024: Joël Matip, 33, former Cameroon and Liverpool defender.
- 14 October 2024: Ryan Bennett, 34, former Grimsby Town, Peterborough United, Norwich City, Wolverhampton Wanderers, Swansea City and Cambridge United defender.
- 16 October 2024: Joe Lewis, 37, former Peterborough United and Cardiff City goalkeeper.
- 17 October 2024: Aiden McGeady, 38, former Republic of Ireland, Everton and Sunderland midfielder.
- 22 October 2024: George Taft, 31, former Burton Albion, Mansfield Town, Cambridge United, Bolton Wanderers and Scunthorpe United defender.
- 1 November 2024: Matt Derbyshire, 38, former Blackburn Rovers, Plymouth Argyle, Wrexham, Birmingham City, Nottingham Forest, Oldham Athletic, Blackpool, Rotherham United and Bradford City striker.
- 9 November 2024: Ryan Babel, 37, former Netherlands, Liverpool and Fulham midfielder.
- 30 November 2024: Lewis Alessandra, 35, former Oldham Athletic, Morecambe, Plymouth Argyle, Rochdale, York City, Hartlepool United, Notts County and Carlisle United forward.
- 8 December 2024: Nani, 38, former Portugal and Manchester United winger.
- 17 December 2024: Cameron Jerome, 38, former Cardiff City, Birmingham City, Stoke City, Norwich City, Derby County, Milton Keynes Dons, Luton Town and Bolton Wanderers forward.
- 20 December 2024: Conor Hourihane, 33, former Republic of Ireland, Plymouth Argyle, Barnsley, Aston Villa, Swansea City, Sheffield United and Derby County midfielder.
- 3 January 2025: James Perch, 39, former Nottingham Forest, Newcastle United, Wigan Athletic, Queens Park Rangers, Scunthorpe United and Mansfield Town defender.
- 7 January 2025: Andreas Bjelland, 36, former Denmark and Brentford defender.
- 25 January 2025: Adam Mekki, 33, former Aldershot Town midfielder.
- 3 February 2025: Shaun Williams, 38, former Republic of Ireland, Milton Keynes Dons, Portsmouth, Millwall and Gillingham midfielder.
- 5 February 2025: Tommy Smith, 32, former Huddersfield Town, Stoke City and Middlesbrough defender.
- 9 February 2025: Gary Liddle, 38, former Hartlepool United, Notts County, Bradford City, Chesterfield, Carlisle United and Walsall defender/midfielder.
- 10 February 2025: Jake Robinson, 38, former Brighton & Hove Albion, Shrewsbury Town and Northampton Town forward.
- 13 February 2025: James Chester, 36, former Wales, Manchester United, Hull City, West Bromwich Albion, Aston Villa, Stoke City, Derby County, Barrow and Salford City defender.
- 13 February 2025: Martyn Waghorn, 35, former Sunderland, Leicester City, Wigan Athletic, Ipswich Town, Derby County, Coventry City and Northampton Town forward.
- 6 March 2025: Álvaro Negredo, 39, former Spain, Manchester City and Middlesbrough forward.
- 24 March 2025: James Tomkins, 35, former Great Britain Olympic, West Ham United and Crystal Palace defender.
- 16 April 2025: Nicky Adams, 38, former Bury, Leicester City, Brentford, Rochdale, Crawley Town, Rotherham United, Northampton Town, Carlisle United and Oldham Athletic midfielder.
- 24 April 2025: Chris Maxwell, 34, former Fleetwood Town, Preston North End, Blackpool and Huddersfield Town goalkeeper.
- 25 April 2025: Tom Broadbent, 33, former Bristol Rovers and Swindon Town defender.
- 3 May 2025: Joe Allen, 35, former Wales, Great Britain Olympic, Swansea City, Liverpool and Stoke City midfielder.
- 3 May 2025: Bobby Grant, 34, former Accrington Stanley, Scunthorpe United, Rochdale, Blackpool and Fleetwood Town forward.
- 3 May 2025: Lukas Jutkiewicz, 36, former Swindon Town, Everton, Coventry City, Middlesbrough, Burnley and Birmingham City forward.
- 3 May 2025: Dean Lewington, 40, former Wimbledon and Milton Keynes Dons defender.
- 7 May 2025: Richard Wood, 39, former Sheffield Wednesday, Coventry City, Charlton Athletic, Rotherham United and Doncaster Rovers defender.
- 23 May 2025: Pepe Reina, 42, former Spain, Liverpool and Aston Villa goalkeeper.
- 26 May 2025: Ben Tozer, 35, former Swindon Town, Newcastle United, Northampton Town, Colchester United, Yeovil Town, Newport County, Cheltenham Town and Wrexham defender.
- 29 May 2025: Jan Vertonghen, 37, former Belgium and Tottenham Hotspur defender.
- 31 May 2025: Jonny Evans, 37, former Northern Ireland, Manchester United, West Bromwich Albion and Leicester City defender.
