= Paul Round =

Paul Round may refer to:

- Paul Round (rugby league)
- Paul Round (footballer)
