= Rabjohn =

Rabjohn is a surname. Notable people with the surname include:

- Chris Rabjohn (1945–2025), British footballer
- Evie Rabjohn (born 2005), English footballer
- Stanley Rabjohn (1914–2001), American film editor
