= Michael Gannon =

Michael Gannon may refer to:

- Michael Gannon (politician) (1848–1898), member of the Queensland Legislative Assembly
- Michael Gannon (historian) (1928–2017), American historian
- Michael Gannon (obstetrician), president of the Australian Medical Association
- Mickey Gannon, fictional character in the Australian TV series Neighbours
- Mick Gannon (Irish footballer) (born 1947), Irish footballer
- Mick Gannon (English footballer) (1943–2024), English footballer
