= Dennis Leigh (footballer) =

English footballer

Personal information
- Full name: Dennis Leigh
- Date of birth: 26 February 1949 (age 77)
- Place of birth: Barnsley, England
- Height: 5 ft 8 1/2 in (1.74 m)
- Position: Left back

Youth career
- –: Doncaster Rovers

Senior career*
Years	Team	Apps	(Gls)
1967–1968	Doncaster Rovers	97	(1)
1968–1973	Rotherham United	160	(10)
1973–1979	Lincoln City	205	(3)
1979–1981	Boston United	54	(1)
Total		456	(15)
- * Club domestic league appearances and goals

Dennis Leigh (born 26 February 1949) is an English former professional footballer who made 402 appearances in the Football League playing for Doncaster Rovers, Rotherham United and Lincoln City. He also played non-league football for Boston United. He played as a left back.

== Life and career ==
Leigh was born in Barnsley, Yorkshire, and began his football career as an apprentice with Doncaster Rovers. He made his debut in February 1967, initially playing on the left of midfield, and made 37 league appearances before, in February 1968, he was part of a multiple transfer in which he and Graham Watson joined fellow Fourth Division club Rotherham United while Colin Clish, Chris Rabjohn and Harold Wilcockson moved in the other direction. Leigh was still just 19, and established himself gradually in the first team at left back and penalty-taker. He averaged 40 games a season over his first four full seasons, but lost his place early in 1972–73 and was transfer-listed.

In February 1973, Leigh became one of Graham Taylor's first signings for Lincoln City, choosing them ahead of Peterborough United. He played regularly as Lincoln came close to promotion in 1974–75 and as they won the Fourth Division title the following season, despite earning himself a reputation for disciplinary problems. He made 229 appearances in all competitions, and left the club after their relegation back to Division Four in 1979, then spending a couple of years in the Alliance Premier League with Boston United.

After retiring from football, Leigh worked for the Lincolnshire Echo; in 2001, he was that newspaper's advertising manager.
