= Rodney Smithson =

English footballer (1943–2024)

Personal information
- Date of birth: 9 October 1943
- Place of birth: Leicester, England
- Date of death: 21 August 2024 (aged 80)
- Position: Defender

Senior career*
Years	Team	Apps	(Gls)
1960–1964	Arsenal	2	(0)
1964–1975	Oxford United	156	(6)
1975–?	Witney Town		

Managerial career
- 1975–?: Witney Town
- * Club domestic league appearances and goals

Rodney Smithson (9 October 1943 – 21 August 2024) was an English professional footballer who played as a defender for Oxford United and Arsenal. While at Oxford, he played 156 league games. After retirement, he went on to be player-manager at Witney Town. Smithson died on 21 August 2024, at the age of 80.
