= David Woodfield =

English footballer (1943–2025)

Personal information
- Date of birth: 11 October 1943
- Place of birth: Leamington Spa, Warwickshire, England
- Date of death: 1 May 2025 (aged 81)
- Height: 5 ft 11 in (1.80 m)
- Position: Defender

Youth career
- 1959–1962: Wolverhampton Wanderers

Senior career*
Years	Team	Apps	(Gls)
1962–1971	Wolverhampton Wanderers	250	(13)
1967	→ Los Angeles Wolves (loan)	6	(1)
1971–1974	Watford	15	(0)
Total		271	(14)

Managerial career
- 1979: Saudi Arabia
- 2000–2001: Sabah
- * Club domestic league appearances and goals

David Woodfield (11 October 1943 – 1 May 2025) was an English football player and coach. He played as a central defender, making over 250 appearances for Wolverhampton Wanderers during the 1960s, before concluding his playing career at Watford. Following retirement, Woodfield embarked on a coaching career that spanned several decades and continents, including a stint as Saudi Arabia national football team manager.

== Playing career ==
Born in Leamington Spa, Woodfield joined Wolverhampton Wanderers in 1959, making his senior debut in 1962, and making 276 appearances for the club in all competitions before being sold to Watford in 1971. During his time with Wolverhampton, he spent time at Los Angeles Wolves in the United Soccer Association. At Watford he made a further 15 league appearances.

== Coaching career ==
Woodfield retired due to injury, and became a coach at Watford. He then spent time as a coach under Qatar manager Frank Wignall. In 1976, he worked with Saudi Arabia manager Bill McGarry.

He later joined Newcastle United as a coach, again under McGarry.

Woodfield returned to Saudi Arabia to manage the national team at the 5th Arabian Gulf Cup in 1979, where they finished third.

He then spent his career abroad until 2011, primarily in Asia, working in Qatar, Saudi Arabia, Kuwait, Bahrain, the UAE, Brunei, Malaysia, Thailand, Brazil and Finland.

== Death ==
Woodfield died on 1 May 2025, at the age of 81.
