= Alan Kell =

English footballer (1949–2024)

Personal information
- Full name: George Allan Kell
- Date of birth: 9 April 1949
- Place of birth: Spennymoor, England
- Date of death: 11 August 2024 (aged 75)
- Position: Wing half

Senior career*
Years	Team	Apps	(Gls)
1966–1968	Darlington	2	(0)
- Spennymoor United
- * Club domestic league appearances and goals

George Allan Kell (9 April 1949 – 11 August 2024) was an English amateur footballer who played as a wing half in the Football League for Darlington and in non-league football for Spennymoor United. Kell made two appearances for Darlington, both as a substitute, in the last two matches of the 1967–68 Fourth Division season. Kell died on 11 August 2024 at the age of 75.
