= Gerry Francis (footballer, born 1933) =

English footballer (1933–2025)

Personal information
- Date of birth: 6 December 1933
- Place of birth: Johannesburg, Transvaal, South Africa
- Date of death: 10 May 2025 (aged 91)
- Place of death: Ontario, Canada
- Position: Right winger

Senior career*
Years	Team	Apps	(Gls)
1957–1961	Leeds United	52	(9)
1961–1962	York City	16	(4)
1962–1964	Tonbridge		
- * Club domestic league appearances and goals

Gerry Francis (6 December 1933 – 10 May 2025) was an English professional footballer who played as a right winger for Leeds United, York City and Tonbridge. He was the first black footballer to play for Leeds.

== Career ==
Francis, who was a shoe-repairer from South Africa, began his footballing career in England as an amateur with Leeds United before being given a professional contract in July 1957. He made his debut in 1957 against Birmingham City, becoming the first black footballer to play for Leeds. He was released in October 1961 to join York City where he scored four goals in 16 appearances in the 1961–62 season.

In three years at Tonbridge, he made 174 appearances and scored 61 goals.

== Personal life and death ==
In 1962, Francis married Anna. Together they had two daughters. In 1971, Francis and his wife migrated to Canada, where he died on 10 May 2025, at the age of 91.

A mural banner depicting Francis by Robert Endeacott was unveiled near the Elland Road car wash fan zone in October 2026 coinciding with Black History Month in the United Kingdom.

== Sources ==
- Mourant, Andrew (1992). Leeds United: Player by Player. Guinness Publishing Ltd. p. 17. ISBN 0-85112-568-9.
