= Jon Durham =

English footballer (1965–2025)

- Durham in 1994

Personal information
- Full name: Jonathan Durham
- Date of birth: 12 June 1965
- Place of birth: Greasbrough, South Yorkshire, England
- Date of death: 16 March 2025 (aged 59)
- Position: Forward

Youth career
- ???–1983: Rotherham United

Senior career*
Years	Team	Apps	(Gls)
1983–1984	Rotherham United	11	(1)
1984–1986	Torquay United	24	(2)
1986–1989	Saltash United		
1989–1991	Tiverton Town		(41)
1991–1994	Taunton Town		
- * Club domestic league appearances and goals

Jonathan Durham (12 June 1965 – 16 March 2025) was an English footballer who played as a striker. He had brief spells for Rotherham United and Torquay United throughout the 1980s and reached the final of the 1993–94 FA Vase with Taunton Town.

== Biography ==
Durham was born on 12 June 1965. He attended Greasbrough Junior School and Wingfield Comprehensive School before entering the youth sector of Rotherham United. He made his senior debut during the 1983–84 season. His opportunities to stand out amongst players such as Ronnie Moore, John Dungworth, Terry Donovan and Phil Walker was difficult as he only made 11 appearances for the club. He scored a single goal for the club in a 1–0 victory against club rivals Bradford City on 29 October 1983. He then played for Torquay United in the following two seasons where he had a marginally better performance at 24 games with 2 goals scored.

Following the next three seasons with Saltash United, he played for Tiverton Town beginning in September 1989 and played until the end of the 1990–91 season, scoring 41 goals in total. He followed this relative success with a transfer to Taunton Town as he made his debut scoring twice in a 4–3 defeat against Watford. Durham formed a combo with fellow striker Andy Perrett, contributing to the 12–0 victory against Dawlish Town during the 1993–94 FA Cup qualifiers. During the season, Durham participated in the 1993–94 FA Vase as he scored the opener against Banstead Athletic in the first match of the fourth round as the club was almost eliminated. He then played in the controversial final that ended in a 3–2 loss with Diss Town being crowned champions of the tournament. This was his final season as he retired before the 1994–95 season.

On 16 March 2025, it was announced that Durham had died at the age of 59.
