= Len Green =

English footballer (1936–2024)

Personal information
- Full name: Leonard Hope Green
- Date of birth: 2 October 1936
- Place of birth: Bishop Auckland, England
- Date of death: 2 November 2024 (aged 88)
- Position: Right back

Senior career*
Years	Team	Apps	(Gls)
- Lingfield Lane
1955–1961	Darlington	50	(0)
- Horden Colliery Welfare
- * Club domestic league appearances and goals

Leonard Hope Green (2 October 1936 – 2 November 2024) was an English footballer who made 50 appearances in the Football League playing as a right back for Darlington. He also played non-league football for clubs including Lingfield Lane and Horden Colliery Welfare.

Green was a member of the Darlington team that drew with Chelsea, League champions only three seasons earlier, in the fourth round of the 1958–59 FA Cup, and won the replay 4–1 to progress to the last 16 of the competition for only the second time in the club's history.

Green died on 2 November 2024, at the age of 88.
