= Tommy Clish =

English footballer (1932–2024)

Personal information
- Full name: Thomas Partridge Clish
- Date of birth: 19 October 1932
- Place of birth: Wheatley Hill, England
- Date of death: 30 July 2024 (aged 91)
- Place of death: Durham, England
- Position: Goalkeeper

Senior career*
Years	Team	Apps	(Gls)
19??–1955	West Ham United	0	(0)
1955–1958	Darlington	52	(0)
- * Club domestic league appearances and goals

Thomas Partridge Clish (19 October 1932 – 30 July 2024) was an English footballer who made 52 appearances in the Football League playing as a goalkeeper for Darlington. He was also on the books of West Ham United, without playing for them in the League. Clish died on 30 July 2024, at the age of 91.
