= Brian Usher =

English footballer (1944–2025)

Personal information
- Date of birth: 11 March 1944
- Place of birth: Durham, England
- Date of death: 3 January 2025 (aged 80)
- Position: Winger

Senior career*
Years	Team	Apps	(Gls)
1963–1965	Sunderland	61	(6)
1965–1968	Sheffield Wednesday	56	(2)
1968–1973	Doncaster Rovers	170	(6)
–	Yeovil Town		
Total		287	(14)
- * Club domestic league appearances and goals

Brian Usher (11 March 1944 – 3 January 2025) was an English footballer who played as a winger in the Football League for Doncaster Rovers, Sheffield Wednesday and Sunderland. Usher died on 3 January 2025, at the age of 80.
