= Mick Gannon (English footballer) =

English footballer

Personal information
- Date of birth: 2 February 1943
- Place of birth: Liverpool, England
- Date of death: 13 June 2024 (aged 81)
- Position: Defender

Senior career*
Years	Team	Apps	(Gls)
1961–1962	Everton	3	(0)
1962–1964	Scunthorpe United	15	(0)
1964–1970	Crewe Alexandra	208	(2)
- Altrincham
Total		226	(305)
- * Club domestic league appearances and goals

Mick Gannon (2 February 1943 – 13 June 2024) was an English former professional footballer who played as a defender for Everton, Scunthorpe United, Crewe Alexandra, and Altrincham.
