= Paul Round (footballer) =

English footballer (1959–2025)

- Round in the 1978–79 season

Personal information
- Date of birth: 22 June 1959
- Place of birth: Blackburn, Lancashire, England
- Date of death: 10 February 2025 (aged 65)
- Positions: Forward; centre-back

Youth career
- ???–1974: St Anthony’s
- 1974–1977: Blackburn Rovers

Senior career*
Years	Team	Apps	(Gls)
1977–1981	Blackburn Rovers	60	(5)
1981–1982	Bury		
1982–1983	Altrincham		
1983–1985	Chorley		
1985–1986	Rossendale United		
1986–1988	Clitheroe		
- * Club domestic league appearances and goals

Paul Round (22 June 1959 – 11 February 2025) was an English footballer who played as a defender. He played for Blackburn Rovers throughout the late 1970s and the early 1980s before going into non-league football throughout the remainder of the decade.

== Biography ==
Round was born on 22 June 1959 at Blackburn. He played for St Anthony’s throughout his early years before catching the interest of Blackburn Rovers who would admit him to playing within their youth sector in November 1974 and would later become an apprentice in July 1975. He would make his senior debut on 26 March 1977 in a 2–0 win against Millwall with Round scoring the second goal himself. He initially played as a forward but would later convert to playing as a centre-back. Over the course of his career with the Blue and Whites, he would make 60 appearances and score 6 goals as he would be a popular figure amongst the club. He was also a part of the starting XI for the club, adorning the number 2 throughout his career. His final game would be on 4 April 1981 as his contract would be released by the end of the season. He would later be trialed with Bury for the 1981–82 season but would soon go into non-league play as he signed with Altrincham in January 1982. He would spend three seasons with Chorley before later signing with Rossendale United. This would lead to him being signed to Clitheroe alongside his teammates Paul Beck and Stewart Procter in the following season. These would be his final two seasons as a player as in the 1988–89 season, he would take over as reserve manager.
