= Chris Rabjohn =

English footballer (1945–2025)

Personal information
- Full name: Chris Rabjohn
- Date of birth: 10 March 1945
- Place of birth: Sheffield, England
- Date of death: 7 May 2025 (aged 80)
- Height: 5 ft 11 in (1.80 m)
- Position: Midfielder

Youth career
- Hillsborough Boy's Club
- Rotherham United

Senior career*
Years	Team	Apps	(Gls)
1965–1968	Rotherham United	78	(5)
1968–1973	Doncaster Rovers	154	(8)
- * Club domestic league appearances and goals

Chris Rabjohn (10 March 1945 – 7 May 2025) was an English footballer who played for Rotherham United and Doncaster Rovers in a variety of midfield positions.

== Career ==
In his early years Rabjohn played locally at Hillsborough Boy's Club and went on to the Rotherham United youth team.

=== Rotherham United ===
Rabjohn signed professional for 2nd Division side Rotherham United, with his debut in 1965. Later in that season he appeared in an FA Cup match at the current League Champions Manchester United who fielded a team full of stars of the time. Rotherham drew, with Rabjohn being said to have had a great game, though they lost the replay 3 days later.

=== Doncaster Rovers ===
As part of a deal including several players swapping teams, Rabjohn moved to English Division 4 club Doncaster Rovers in February 1968. His debut was in a 1–1 draw at Bradford Park Avenue on 17 February 1968. His first goal came in the following season on 23 August in a 4–3 home win over Scunthorpe United. That season he went on to make 30 appearances playing in a variety of positions including right half, left half, inside right, and right wing, and score 3 goals in what was Doncaster's title winning year as they gained promotion to Division 3. He also appeared in the side that season that lost 2–0 away to Liverpool in the 3rd Round of the FA Cup.

After making a total of 169 League and Cup appearances, scoring 9 goals, it was at the end of the 1972–73 season that Rabjohn was released on a free transfer with Northampton Town being an interested party at the time.

== Death ==
Rabjohn died on 7 May 2025, at the age of 80.

== Honours ==
Doncaster Rovers

- English Division 4: 1968–69
