= 1957–58 Colchester United F.C. season =

Colchester United
1957–58 season
- Chairman: Bill Allen
- Manager: Benny Fenton
- Stadium: Layer Road
- Third Division South: 12th
- FA Cup: 1st round (eliminated by Wisbech Town)
- Top goalscorer: League: Ken Plant (19); All: Ken Plant (19)
- Highest home attendance: 11,077 v Norwich City, 14 September 1957
- Lowest home attendance: 4,391 v Northampton Town, 30 September 1957
- Average home league attendance: 10,891
- Biggest win: 4–0 v Watford, 26 December 1957
- Biggest defeat: 0–7 v Reading, 18 September 1957
Home colours

The 1957–58 season was Colchester United's 16th season in their history and their eighth season in the Third Division South, the third tier of English football. Alongside competing in the Third Division South, the club also participated in the FA Cup. They were eliminated at the first round stage of the cup for the fifth successive season, on this occasion to non-league side Wisbech Town. In the league, with the division being restructured at the end of the season, Colchester managed to finish in the top half of the table by three points to avoid a move to the newly formed Fourth Division, instead remaining in the third tier.

== Season overview ==
With Football League reorganisation looming at the end of the season, Colchester's priority for the 1957–58 season was to finish in the top half of the table to join the top half of the Third Division North to form the new nationwide Third Division. The other teams would form the Fourth Division.

During the campaign, Benny Fenton's squad suffered from numerous call-ups for national service, and as such Fenton brought in reinforcements in November with Neil Langman arriving from Plymouth Argyle for £6,750 and John Evans for £4,000 from Liverpool. Meanwhile, Birmingham City offered Colchester £10,000 for winger Peter Wright, but he opted to remain as a part-time player.

Colchester secured their place in the third tier for another season in the final game of the season when they beat Southampton 4–2 at Layer Road.

== Players ==
As of match played 1 May 1957.

Name	Position	Nationality	Place of birth	Date of birth	Apps	Goals	Signed from	Date signed	Fee
Goalkeepers
Percy Ames	GK	(England)	Plymouth	13 December 1931 (aged 25)	92	0	(England) Tottenham Hotspur	1 May 1955	Free transfer
John Wright	GK	(England)	Aldershot	13 August 1933 (aged 23)	4	0	(England) Colchester Casuals	23 May 1952	Free transfer
Defenders
Brian Dobson	CB	(England)	Colchester	1 March 1934 (aged 23)	6	0	Amateur	January 1956	Free transfer
George Fisher	FB	(England)	Bermondsey	19 June 1925 (aged 31)	89	3	(England) Fulham	1 September 1955	£1,000
John Fowler	FB	(Scotland)	Leith	17 October 1933 (aged 23)	60	3	(Scotland) Bonnyrigg Rose Athletic	20 August 1955 (Note: Date of signing refers to the date of the player's first game for the club)	Free transfer
John Laidlaw	FB	(England)	Aldershot	5 July 1936 (aged 20)	0	0	(Scotland) Easthouses Lily Miners Welfare	June 1957	Free transfer
Alf Marshall	FB	(England)	Dagenham	21 May 1933 (aged 24)	0	0	(England) Dagenham	14 October 1957	£25
Chic Milligan	CB	(Scotland)	Ardrossan	26 July 1930 (aged 26)	35	1	(Scotland) Ardrossan Winton Rovers	18 August 1956	£1,000
Edgar Rumney	FB	(England)	Abberton	15 September 1936 (aged 20)	0	0	(England) Colchester Casuals	1 May 1957	Free transfer
Midfielders
Benny Fenton	WH	(England)	West Ham	10 October 1918 (aged 38)	83	12	(England) Charlton Athletic	5 March 1955	£500
Trevor Harris	WH	(England)	Colchester	6 February 1936 (aged 21)	3	0	Amateur	July 1951	Free transfer
Bert Hill	WH	(England)	West Ham	8 March 1930 (aged 27)	75	3	(England) Chelsea	September 1952	£300
Ron Hunt	WH	(England)	Colchester	26 September 1933 (aged 23)	34	0	Amateur	October 1951	Free transfer
Derek Parker	WH	(England)	Wivenhoe	23 June 1926 (aged 30)	6	0	(England) West Ham United	March 1957	£2,500
Forwards
Russell Blake	WG	(England)	Colchester	24 July 1935 (aged 21)	7	0	(England) Dedham Old Boys	8 September 1955	Free transfer
John Evans	IF	(England)	Tilbury	28 August 1929 (aged 27)	0	0	(England) Liverpool	23 November 1957	£4,000
Bobby Hill	IF	(Scotland)	Edinburgh	9 June 1938 (aged 18)	43	8	(Scotland) Easthouses Lily Miners Welfare	9 June 1955	Free transfer
Martyn King	CF	(England)	Birmingham	23 August 1937 (aged 19)	3	1	Amateur	Summer 1955	Free transfer
Neil Langman	CF	(England)	Bere Alston	21 February 1932 (aged 25)	0	0	(England) Plymouth Argyle	November 1957	£6,750
Kevin McCurley	CF	(England)	Consett	2 April 1926 (aged 31)	189	74	(England) Liverpool	June 1951	£750
Sammy McLeod	IF	(Scotland)	Glasgow	4 January 1934 (aged 23)	47	4	(Scotland) Easthouses Lily Miners Welfare	20 August 1955	Free transfer
Hamish McNeill	IF	(Scotland)	Alva	16 November 1934 (aged 22)	0	0	(Scotland) Bonnyrigg Rose Athletic	August 1957	£600
Ken Plant	CF	(England)	Nuneaton	15 August 1925 (aged 31)	143	60	(England) Bury	January 1954	Undisclosed
Tommy Williams	WG	(England)	Battersea	10 February 1935 (aged 22)	23	3	(England) Carshalton Athletic	September 1956	Free transfer
Peter Wright	WG	(England)	Colchester	26 January 1934 (aged 23)	158	30	Amateur	November 1951	Free transfer

== Transfers ==
=== In ===
Date	Position	Nationality	Name	From	Fee	Ref.
1 May 1957	FB	(England)	Edgar Rumney	(England) Colchester Casuals	Free transfer	
June 1957	FB	(England)	John Laidlaw	(Scotland) Easthouses Lily Miners Welfare	Free transfer	
August 1957	IF	(Scotland)	Hamish McNeill	(Scotland) Bonnyrigg Rose Athletic	£600	
14 October 1957	FB	(England)	Alf Marshall	(England) Dagenham	£25	
November 1957	CF	(England)	Neil Langman	(England) Plymouth Argyle	£6,750	
23 November 1957	IF	(England)	John Evans	(England) Liverpool	£4,000	(Note: Date of signing refers to the date of the player's first game for the club)

- Total spending: ▼ ~ £11,375

=== Out ===
Date	Position	Nationality	Name	To	Fee	Ref.
31 May 1957	WG	(England)	Les Barrell	(England) Clacton Town	Released	
June 1957	IF	(England)	Eddie Smith	(England) Queens Park Rangers	£1,050	
July 1957	CB	(England)	Reg Stewart	(England) Hastings United	Free transfer	

- Total incoming: ▲ ~ £1,050

== Match details ==
=== Third Division South ===
==== Results round by round ====
Round	1	2	3	4	5	6	7	8	9	10	11	12	13	14	15	16	17	18	19	20	21	22	23	24	25	26	27	28	29	30	31	32	33	34	35	36	37	38	39	40	41	42	43	44	45	46
Ground	H	A	A	H	A	H	H	A	A	A	H	H	A	A	H	A	A	H	A	H	H	A	A	A	H	H	A	H	A	H	A	H	A	H	A	H	A	H	A	H	H	A	A	H	H	H
Result	W	L	D	W	W	L	L	L	D	L	D	W	L	D	W	D	W	W	L	D	W	D	L	W	W	D	D	W	D	W	L	W	L	W	W	L	L	L	D	D	D	L	L	W	L	W
Position	7	3	11	7	6	6	13	15	16	22	21	16	21	15	13	12	7	7	8	8	7	8	12	11	11	12	10	8	8	9	9	7	8	8	7	9	10	11	10	11	11	12	12	12	12	12

Source: 11v11.com
A = Away; H = Home; W = Win; D = Draw; L = Loss

==== League table ====
Pos	Team	Pld	W	D	L	GF	GA	GAv	Pts	Promotion or relegation
10	Queens Park Rangers	46	18	14	14	64	65	0.985	50	Qualification for the Third Division
11	Newport County	46	17	14	15	73	67	1.090	48	Qualification for the Third Division
12	Colchester United	46	17	13	16	77	79	0.975	47	Qualification for the Third Division
13	Northampton Town (R)	46	19	6	21	87	79	1.101	44	Relegation to the Fourth Division
14	Crystal Palace (R)	46	15	13	18	70	72	0.972	43	Relegation to the Fourth Division

(R) Relegated

==== Matches ====
24 August 1957 1	Colchester United	3–0	Torquay United	Colchester
	McCurley (pen.); P. Wright	Report		Stadium: Layer Road; Attendance: 9,760

26 August 1957 2	Queens Park Rangers	1–0	Colchester United	Shepherd's Bush
	Cameron	Report		Stadium: Loftus Road; Attendance: 12,135

31 August 1957 3	Brentford	3–3	Colchester United	Brentford
	Newcombe 1'; Towers	Report	Parker; P. Wright	Stadium: Griffin Park; Attendance: 12,730

2 September 1957 4	Colchester United	2–1	Queens Park Rangers	Colchester
	P. Wright 90'; McCurley	Report	Finney	Stadium: Layer Road; Attendance: 8,992

7 September 1957 5	Southend United	2–3	Colchester United	Southend-on-Sea
	Crossan 17'	Report; Report	Plant 6'; P. Wright 12'; McCurley 51' (pen.)	Stadium: Roots Hall; Attendance: 18,125

9 September 1957 6	Colchester United	1–3	Reading	Colchester
	McCurley	Report	Unknown goalscorer	Stadium: Layer Road; Attendance: 8,774

14 September 1957 7	Colchester United	1–2	Norwich City	Colchester
	McCurley	Report	Unknown goalscorer	Stadium: Layer Road; Attendance: 11,077

18 September 1957 8	Reading	7–0	Colchester United	Reading
	Unknown goalscorer	Report		Stadium: Elm Park; Attendance: 13,811

21 September 1957 9	Bournemouth & Boscombe Athletic	1–1	Colchester United	Bournemouth
	Dowsett 46'	Report	McNeill 4'	Stadium: Dean Court; Attendance: 16,057

26 September 1957 10	Northampton Town	4–1	Colchester United	Northampton
	Unknown goalscorer	Report	Plant	Stadium: County Ground; Attendance: 4,000

28 September 1957 11	Colchester United	1–1	Walsall	Colchester
	P. Wright	Report	Unknown goalscorer	Stadium: Layer Road; Attendance: 7,366

30 September 1957 12	Colchester United	1–0	Northampton Town	Colchester
	P. Wright	Report		Stadium: Layer Road; Attendance: 4,391

5 October 1957 13	Coventry City	1–0	Colchester United	Coventry
	Griffiths 40'	Report		Stadium: Highfield Road; Attendance: 14,423

9 October 1957 14	Plymouth Argyle	1–1	Colchester United	Plymouth
	Langman	Report; Report	McLeod	Stadium: Home Park; Attendance: 22,550

12 October 1957 15	Colchester United	3–0	Exeter City	Colchester
	Plant; McCurley	Report		Stadium: Layer Road; Attendance: 7,930

15 October 1957 16	Watford	1–1	Colchester United	Watford
	Anderson	Report	P. Wright	Stadium: Vicarage Road; Attendance: 6,580

19 October 1957 17	Gillingham	2–3	Colchester United	Gillingham
	Unknown goalscorer	Report	McCurley; Williams	Stadium: Priestfield Stadium; Attendance: 8,535

26 October 1957 18	Colchester United	2–1	Millwall	Colchester
	P. Wright 65'; Plant 79'	Report	Shepherd 8'	Stadium: Layer Road; Attendance: 9,260

2 November 1957 19	Swindon Town	4–0	Colchester United	Swindon
	Micklewright 26'; Edwards 37'; Skull 76'; Richards 83'	Report; Report		Stadium: County Ground; Attendance: 14,198

9 November 1957 20	Colchester United	1–1	Aldershot	Colchester
	Fenton 71'	Report	Lacey 83'	Stadium: Layer Road; Attendance: 7,569

23 November 1957 21	Colchester United	2–1	Port Vale	Colchester
	Plant 5'; Williams 45'	Report	Askey 79'	Stadium: Layer Road; Attendance: 9,106; Referee: C. Woan

30 November 1957 22	Newport County	2–2	Colchester United	Newport
	Harris 17'; Dixon 28'	Report	Langman 2'; Plant 8'	Stadium: Somerton Park; Attendance: 8,866

14 December 1957 23	Brighton & Hove Albion	5–2	Colchester United	Hove
	Gordon 4', 76'; Sexton 20' (pen.); Harburn 50'; Howard 55'	Report	Fisher 16' (pen.); Williams 51'	Stadium: Goldstone Ground; Attendance: 9,716

21 December 1957 24	Torquay United	1–3	Colchester United	Torquay
	Northcott 80'	Report	P. Wright 20', 40'; Evans	Stadium: Plainmoor; Attendance: 5,749

26 December 1957 25	Colchester United	4–0	Watford	Colchester
	Plant; Langman	Report		Stadium: Layer Road; Attendance: 9,379

28 December 1957 26	Colchester United	1–1	Brentford	Colchester
	Langman	Report	Francis	Stadium: Layer Road; Attendance: 9,548

4 January 1958 27	Shrewsbury Town	0–0	Colchester United	Shrewsbury
		Report		Stadium: Gay Meadow; Attendance: 5,600

11 January 1958 28	Colchester United	1–0	Southend United	Colchester
	Williams 55'	Report; Report		Stadium: Layer Road; Attendance: 9,357

18 January 1958 29	Norwich City	1–1	Colchester United	Norwich
	Unknown goalscorer	Report	Plant	Stadium: Carrow Road; Attendance: 17,523

1 February 1958 30	Colchester United	3–2	Bournemouth & Boscombe Athletic	Colchester
	Evans; P. Wright	Report	Unknown goalscorer	Stadium: Layer Road; Attendance: 8,091

8 February 1958 31	Walsall	3–0	Colchester United	Walsall
	Unknown goalscorer	Report		Stadium: Fellows Park; Attendance: 7,639

15 February 1958 32	Colchester United	4–1	Coventry City	Colchester
	Fenton (pen.) (pen.); Plant	Report	Unknown goalscorer	Stadium: Layer Road; Attendance: 8,613

22 February 1958 33	Exeter City	4–3	Colchester United	Exeter
	Unknown goalscorer	Report	Evans; Plant; Langman	Stadium: St James Park; Attendance: 7,636

1 March 1958 34	Colchester United	3–2	Gillingham	Colchester
	Plant; Langman	Report	Unknown goalscorer	Stadium: Layer Road; Attendance: 8,158

8 March 1958 35	Millwall	1–4	Colchester United	New Cross
	Johnson	Report	Plant; Langman; P. Wright	Stadium: The Den; Attendance: 7,307

15 March 1958 36	Colchester United	1–3	Swindon Town	Colchester
	Langman	Report; Report	Edwards; Richards; Kelly	Stadium: Layer Road; Attendance: 9,241

22 March 1958 37	Port Vale	2–0	Colchester United	Burslem
	Steele; Wilkinson	Report		Stadium: Vale Park; Attendance: 7,161

29 March 1958 38	Colchester United	1–2	Brighton & Hove Albion	Colchester
	Evans	Report	Unknown goalscorer	Stadium: Layer Road; Attendance: 8,751

4 April 1958 39	Crystal Palace	1–1	Colchester United	Selhurst
	Unknown goalscorer	Report	Plant	Stadium: Selhurst Park; Attendance: 17,787

7 April 1958 40	Colchester United	1–1	Crystal Palace	Colchester
	Evans	Report	Unknown goalscorer	Stadium: Layer Road; Attendance: 9,528

12 April 1958 41	Colchester United	1–1	Newport County	Colchester
	Langman	Report	Harris	Stadium: Layer Road; Attendance: 7,472

16 April 1958 42	Aldershot	2–1	Colchester United	Aldershot
	Unknown goalscorer	Report	Plant	Stadium: Recreation Ground; Attendance: 2,630

19 April 1958 43	Southampton	3–2	Colchester United	Southampton
	Roper; Reeves; Page	Report	McCurley	Stadium: The Dell; Attendance: 13,842

21 April 1958 44	Colchester United	3–0	Shrewsbury Town	Colchester
	Evans; McCurley; P. Wright	Report		Stadium: Layer Road; Attendance: 7,092

26 April 1958 45	Colchester United	1–2	Plymouth Argyle	Colchester
	Blake 1'	Report; Report	Carter 56' (pen.); Baker 81'	Stadium: Layer Road; Attendance: 8,593

1 May 1958 46	Colchester United	4–2	Southampton	Colchester
	McCurley; Blake; McLeod; Williams	Report	Mulgrew; Reeves	Stadium: Layer Road; Attendance: 8,914

=== FA Cup ===
16 November 1957 1st round	Wisbech Town	1–0	Colchester United	Wisbech
	Pye 67'	Report		Stadium: Fenland Park; Attendance: 9,552

== Squad statistics ==
=== Appearances and goals ===
No.	Pos	Nat	Player	Total		Third Division South		FA Cup	
No.	Pos	Nat	Player	Apps	Goals	Apps	Goals	Apps	Goals
	GK	(England) ENG	Percy Ames	47	0	46	0	1	0
	DF	(England) ENG	Brian Dobson	17	0	16	0	1	0
	DF	(England) ENG	George Fisher	46	1	45	1	1	0
	DF	(Scotland) SCO	John Fowler	46	0	46	0	0	0
	DF	(Scotland) SCO	Chic Milligan	27	0	26	0	1	0
	DF	(England) ENG	Edgar Rumney	5	0	5	0	0	0
	MF	(England) ENG	Benny Fenton	23	3	23	3	0	0
	MF	(England) ENG	Trevor Harris	7	0	7	0	0	0
	MF	(England) ENG	Bert Hill	32	0	31	0	1	0
	MF	(England) ENG	Ron Hunt	4	0	4	0	0	0
	MF	(England) ENG	Derek Parker	30	1	29	1	1	0
	FW	(England) ENG	Russell Blake	8	2	8	2	0	0
	FW	(England) ENG	John Evans	24	7	24	7	0	0
	FW	(Scotland) SCO	Bobby Hill	11	0	11	0	0	0
	FW	(England) ENG	Neil Langman	23	8	23	8	0	0
	FW	(England) ENG	Kevin McCurley	29	12	28	12	1	0
	FW	(Scotland) SCO	Sammy McLeod	16	2	15	2	1	0
	FW	(Scotland) SCO	Hamish McNeill	2	1	2	1	0	0
	FW	(England) ENG	Ken Plant	45	19	44	19	1	0
	FW	(England) ENG	Tommy Williams	29	5	28	5	1	0
	FW	(England) ENG	Peter Wright	46	16	45	16	1	0

=== Goalscorers ===
Place	Nationality	Position	Name	Third Division South	FA Cup	Total
1	(England)	CF	Ken Plant	19	0	19
2	(England)	WG	Peter Wright	16	0	16
3	(England)	CF	Kevin McCurley	12	0	12
4	(England)	CF	Neil Langman	8	0	8
5	(England)	IF	John Evans	7	0	7
6	(England)	WG	Tommy Williams	5	0	5
7	(England)	WH	Benny Fenton	3	0	3
8	(England)	WG	Russell Blake	2	0	2
8	(Scotland)	IF	Sammy McLeod	2	0	2
10	(England)	FB	George Fisher	1	0	1
10	(Scotland)	IF	Hamish McNeill	1	0	1
10	(England)	WH	Derek Parker	1	0	1
			Own goals	0	0	0
			TOTALS	77	0	77

=== Disciplinary record ===
Nationality	Position	Name	Third Division South		FA Cup		Total	
Nationality	Position	Name	Booked	Sent off (straight red)	Booked	Sent off (straight red)	Booked	Sent off (straight red)
(England)	WH	Benny Fenton	1	0	0	0	1	0
		TOTALS	1	0	0	0	1	0

=== Clean sheets ===
Number of games goalkeepers kept a clean sheet.

Place	Nationality	Player	Third Division South	FA Cup	Total
1	(England)	Percy Ames	7	0	7
		TOTALS	7	0	7

=== Player debuts ===
Players making their first-team Colchester United debut in a fully competitive match.

Position	Nationality	Player	Date	Opponent	Ground	Notes
FB	(England)	Edgar Rumney	2 September 1957	Queens Park Rangers	Layer Road	
IF	(Scotland)	Hamish McNeill	21 September 1957	Bournemouth & Boscombe Athletic	Dean Court	
IF	(England)	John Evans	23 November 1957	Port Vale	Layer Road	
CF	(England)	Neil Langman	23 November 1957	Port Vale	Layer Road	

== See also ==
- List of Colchester United F.C. seasons
