= 1956–57 Colchester United F.C. season =

Colchester United
1956–57 season
- Chairman: Bill Allen
- Manager: Benny Fenton
- Stadium: Layer Road
- Third Division South: 3rd
- FA Cup: 1st round (eliminated by Southend United)
- Top goalscorer: League: Ken Plant (24); All: Ken Plant (24)
- Highest home attendance: 18,559 v Ipswich Town, 16 February 1957
- Lowest home attendance: 5,899 v Northampton Town, 22 December 1956
- Average home league attendance: 9,351
- Biggest win: 6–0 v Shrewsbury Town, 29 September 1956
- Biggest defeat: 1–4 v Southend United, 17 November 1956; 1–4 v Swindon Town, 27 April 1957
Home colours

The 1956–57 season was Colchester United's 15th season in their history and their seventh season in the Third Division South, the third tier of English football. Alongside competing in the Third Division South, the club also participated in the FA Cup in which the club were eliminated by Southend United in the first round in the first Essex derby in a cup competition. The season would be Colchester United's highest league finish for 50 years by ending their campaign in third position. It has only been bettered on three occasions; the 2005–06 season, 2006–07 season and the 2007–08 season.

== Season overview ==
The 1956–57 season proved to be Colchester United's best finish in their history, ending the season in third position in the third tier with a result that was not bettered until 2006. For the majority of the season, Colchester were favourites for promotion, during which time they went 20 league games unbeaten between December 1956 and Easter 1957.

Colchester and rivals Ipswich Town vied for the top spot for much of the season. Colchester were seven-points ahead of their third-placed rivals when the two sides met at Layer Road on 16 February 1957. A record crowd of 18,559 witnessed the 0–0 draw, with over 4,000 fans turned away and over 100 spectators witnessing the action from the roof of the Popular Side stand. Player-manager Benny Fenton missed a 21st-minute penalty during the match, which was saved by Ipswich goalkeeper Roy Bailey.

A 2–1 win over second-placed Torquay United, who trailed by four points as a result, improved Colchester's title credentials. However, the loss of influential players to injury including Bob Dale and Chic Milligan damaged Colchester's hopes. Three consecutive draws in late March and early April allowed Torquay to close the gap to just one point, with Ipswich five points adrift. Over Easter 1957, Colchester lost three consecutive away games at Millwall, Walsall and Swindon Town, but won their final game of the season 2–0 against Watford to put them back at the top of the table, but both Ipswich and Torquay's final matches were 24 hours later. Both sides won their final games, with Colchester slipping to third position in the table and Ipswich were promoted as champions, level on points with Torquay but with a better goal average, while they finished one point ahead of Colchester. Colchester played the entire season unbeaten at Layer Road.

== Players ==
As of match played 29 April 1957.

Name	Position	Nationality	Place of birth	Date of birth	Apps	Goals	Signed from	Date signed	Fee
Goalkeepers
Percy Ames	GK	(England)	Plymouth	13 December 1931 (aged 24)	45	0	(England) Tottenham Hotspur	1 May 1955	Free transfer
John Wright	GK	(England)	Aldershot	13 August 1933 (aged 22)	4	0	(England) Colchester Casuals	23 May 1952	Free transfer
Defenders
Brian Dobson	CB	(England)	Colchester	1 March 1934 (aged 22)	6	0	Amateur	January 1956	Free transfer
George Fisher	FB	(England)	Bermondsey	19 June 1925 (aged 30)	43	1	(England) Fulham	1 September 1955	£1,000
John Fowler	FB	(Scotland)	Leith	17 October 1933 (aged 22)	16	2	(Scotland) Bonnyrigg Rose Athletic	20 August 1955 (Note: Date of signing refers to the date of the player's first game for the club)	Free transfer
Chic Milligan	CB	(Scotland)	Ardrossan	26 July 1930 (aged 25)	0	0	(Scotland) Ardrossan Winton Rovers	18 August 1956	£1,000
Reg Stewart	CB	(England)	Sheffield	30 October 1925 (aged 30)	307	2	(England) Sheffield Wednesday	20 August 1949	£1,000
Midfielders
Benny Fenton	WH	(England)	West Ham	10 October 1918 (aged 37)	44	4	(England) Charlton Athletic	5 March 1955	£500
Trevor Harris	WH	(England)	Colchester	6 February 1936 (aged 20)	3	0	Amateur	July 1951	Free transfer
Bert Hill	WH	(England)	West Ham	8 March 1930 (aged 26)	60	2	(England) Chelsea	September 1952	£300
Ron Hunt	WH	(England)	Colchester	26 September 1933 (aged 22)	34	0	Amateur	October 1951	Free transfer
Derek Parker	WH	(England)	Wivenhoe	23 June 1926 (aged 29)	0	0	(England) West Ham United	March 1957	£2,500
Forwards
Les Barrell	WG	(England)	Colchester	30 August 1932 (aged 23)	0	0	(England) Lexden Wanderers	Summer 1956	Free transfer
Russell Blake	WG	(England)	Colchester	24 July 1935 (aged 20)	5	0	(England) Dedham Old Boys	8 September 1955	Free transfer
Bobby Hill	IF	(Scotland)	Edinburgh	9 June 1938 (aged 17)	4	1	(Scotland) Easthouses Lily Miners Welfare	9 June 1955	Free transfer
Martyn King	CF	(England)	Birmingham	23 August 1937 (aged 18)	0	0	Amateur	Summer 1955	Free transfer
Kevin McCurley	CF	(England)	Consett	2 April 1926 (aged 30)	157	64	(England) Liverpool	June 1951	£750
Sammy McLeod	IF	(Scotland)	Glasgow	4 January 1934 (aged 22)	43	2	(Scotland) Easthouses Lily Miners Welfare	20 August 1955	Free transfer
Ken Plant	CF	(England)	Nuneaton	15 August 1925 (aged 30)	96	36	(England) Bury	January 1954	Undisclosed
Eddie Smith	IF	(England)	Marylebone	23 March 1939 (aged 17)	0	0	(England) Northampton Town	June 1956	Undisclosed
Tommy Williams	WG	(England)	Battersea	10 February 1935 (aged 21)	0	0	(England) Carshalton Athletic	September 1956	Free transfer
Peter Wright	WG	(England)	Colchester	26 January 1934 (aged 22)	113	22	Amateur	November 1951	Free transfer

== Transfers ==
=== In ===
Date	Position	Nationality	Name	From	Fee	Ref.
Summer 1956	WG	(England)	Les Barrell	(England) Lexden Wanderers	Free transfer	
June 1956	IF	(England)	Eddie Smith	(England) Northampton Town	Undisclosed	
18 August 1956	CB	(Scotland)	Chic Milligan	(Scotland) Ardrossan Winton Rovers	£1,000	(Note: Date of signing refers to the date of the player's first game for the club)
September 1956	WG	(England)	Tommy Williams	(England) Carshalton Athletic	Free transfer	
March 1957	WH	(England)	Derek Parker	(England) West Ham United	£2,500	

- Total spending: ▼ ~ £3,500

=== Out ===
Date	Position	Nationality	Name	To	Fee	Ref.
End of season	GK	(England)	George Wright	(England) Sudbury Town	Free transfer	
End of season	IF	(England)	Alfred Noble	(England) Leytonstone	Free transfer	
Summer 1956	CB	(England)	Billy Hunt	(England) Sudbury Town	Released	
September 1956	FB	(England)	John Harrison	Free agent	Retired	
16 February 1957	WH	(England)	Bob Dale	Free agent	Retired	(Note: Date of departure refers to the date of the player's final game for the club)
March 1957	FB	(England)	George French	Retired	Retired	

== Match details ==
=== Third Division South ===
==== Results round by round ====
Round	1	2	3	4	5	6	7	8	9	10	11	12	13	14	15	16	17	18	19	20	21	22	23	24	25	26	27	28	29	30	31	32	33	34	35	36	37	38	39	40	41	42	43	44	45	46
Ground	H	A	A	H	H	A	A	H	H	A	A	H	H	A	H	A	H	A	H	H	A	A	H	H	A	A	H	H	A	A	H	A	H	A	H	A	H	A	H	A	H	H	A	A	A	H
Result	W	W	L	D	D	L	D	W	W	W	L	W	W	L	W	L	W	D	D	W	L	L	W	D	W	D	W	W	W	W	W	W	D	D	W	D	D	W	D	D	D	W	L	L	L	W
Position	4	4	10	7	11	14	15	12	9	4	8	2	1	3	3	3	4	3	3	3	4	5	4	4	3	3	3	2	1	1	1	1	1	1	1	1	1	1	1	1	1	1	1	2	3	3

Source: 11v11.com
A = Away; H = Home; W = Win; D = Draw; L = Loss

==== League table ====
Pos	Team	Pld	W	D	L	GF	GA	GAv	Pts	Promotion or relegation
1	Ipswich Town	46	25	9	12	101	54	1.870	59	Division Champions, promoted
2	Torquay United	46	24	11	11	89	64	1.391	59	
3	Colchester United	46	22	14	10	84	56	1.500	58	
4	Southampton	46	22	10	14	76	52	1.462	54	
5	Bournemouth & Boscombe Athletic	46	19	14	13	88	62	1.419	52	

==== Matches ====
18 August 1956 1	Colchester United	3–2	Southend United	Colchester
	P. Wright 14'; McCurley 16'; Barrell 36'	Report; Report	Duthie 24'; Stirling 71'	Stadium: Layer Road; Attendance: 11,454

22 August 1956 2	Crystal Palace	2–4	Colchester United	Selhurst
	Unknown goalscorer	Report	Smith; Plant	Stadium: Selhurst Park; Attendance: 9,400

25 August 1956 3	Northampton Town	1–0	Colchester United	Northampton
	Unknown goalscorer	Report		Stadium: County Ground; Attendance: 9,869

27 August 1956 4	Colchester United	3–3	Crystal Palace	Colchester
	Fenton pen.' Bobby Hill; Fowler	Report	Unknown goalscorer	Stadium: Layer Road; Attendance: 6,979

1 September 1956 5	Colchester United	1–1	Queens Park Rangers	Colchester
	Plant	Report	Unknown goalscorer	Stadium: Layer Road; Attendance: 8,179

5 September 1956 6	Southampton	2–1	Colchester United	Southampton
	Shields; Walker	Report	Plant	Stadium: The Dell; Attendance: 11,783

8 September 1956 7	Plymouth Argyle	2–2	Colchester United	Plymouth
	Kearns; Rowley	Report; Report	Smith; P. Wright	Stadium: Home Park; Attendance: 9,702

10 September 1956 8	Colchester United	3–1	Southampton	Colchester
	Smith; Plant; McCurley	Report	Mulgrew	Stadium: Layer Road; Attendance: 7,208

15 September 1956 9	Colchester United	3–2	Reading	Colchester
	Fenton pen.' Dale; Plant	Report	Unknown goalscorer	Stadium: Layer Road; Attendance: 8,908

19 September 1956 10	Exeter City	0–2	Colchester United	Exeter
		Report	Smith; Plant	Stadium: St James Park; Attendance: 8,360

22 September 1956 11	Newport County	1–0	Colchester United	Newport
	Sheppeard	Report		Stadium: Somerton Park; Attendance: 12,426

24 September 1956 12	Colchester United	4–0	Exeter City	Colchester
	Fenton; Plant; McCurley	Report		Stadium: Layer Road; Attendance: 6,754

29 September 1956 13	Colchester United	6–0	Shrewsbury Town	Colchester
	Fisher; Plant; McCurley	Report		Stadium: Layer Road; Attendance: 9,784

6 October 1956 14	Ipswich Town	3–1	Colchester United	Ipswich
	Phillips 42', 47', 54'	Report; Report	Plant 86'	Stadium: Portman Road; Attendance: 20,431; Referee: J. Barradell

13 October 1956 15	Colchester United	3–0	Bournemouth & Boscombe Athletic	Colchester
	Smith; Plant; McCurley	Report		Stadium: Layer Road; Attendance: 9,363

20 October 1956 16	Torquay United	4–2	Colchester United	Torquay
	Unknown goalscorer	Report	Dale; Bobby Hill	Stadium: Plainmoor; Attendance: 8,753

27 October 1956 17	Colchester United	2–1	Millwall	Colchester
	McCurley; P. Wright	Report	Shepherd	Stadium: Layer Road; Attendance: 9,548

3 November 1956 18	Brighton & Hove Albion	0–0	Colchester United	Hove
		Report		Stadium: Goldstone Ground; Attendance: 13,601

10 November 1956 19	Colchester United	0–0	Gillingham	Colchester
		Report		Stadium: Layer Road; Attendance: 8,891

24 November 1956 20	Colchester United	1–0	Brentford	Colchester
	Bobby Hill	Report		Stadium: Layer Road; Attendance: 7,290

1 December 1956 21	Aldershot	2–1	Colchester United	Aldershot
	Unknown goalscorer	Report	Bobby Hill	Stadium: Recreation Ground; Attendance: 4,416

15 December 1956 22	Southend United	3–2	Colchester United	Southend-on-Sea
	Barker 31'; McGuigan 37'; Thomson 65'	Report; Report	Milligan 46'; Plant 76'	Stadium: Roots Hall; Attendance: 8,100

22 December 1956 23	Colchester United	5–1	Northampton Town	Colchester
	Smith; P. Wright; McLeod	Report	Unknown goalscorer	Stadium: Layer Road; Attendance: 5,899

25 December 1956 24	Colchester United	1–1	Norwich City	Colchester
	Plant	Report	Unknown goalscorer	Stadium: Layer Road; Attendance: 6,376

26 December 1956 25	Norwich City	1–2	Colchester United	Norwich
	Unknown goalscorer	Report	King; Williams	Stadium: Carrow Road; Attendance: 8,462

29 December 1956 26	Queens Park Rangers	1–1	Colchester United	Shepherd's Bush
	Unknown goalscorer	Report	Fisher pen.'	Stadium: Loftus Road; Attendance: 8,760

5 January 1957 27	Colchester United	3–2	Coventry City	Colchester
	Bobby Hill; Plant; P. Wright	Report	McPherson; Rogers	Stadium: Layer Road; Attendance: 7,302

12 January 1957 28	Colchester United	2–1	Plymouth Argyle	Colchester
	Plant; Williams	Report; Report	Rowley	Stadium: Layer Road; Attendance: 7,732

19 January 1957 29	Reading	0–3	Colchester United	Reading
		Report	Smith	Stadium: Elm Park; Attendance: 9,502

26 January 1957 30	Coventry City	2–4	Colchester United	Coventry
	Boxley pen.' Simpson	Report	Fenton; Smith; Plant; P. Wright	Stadium: Highfield Road; Attendance: 14,834

2 February 1957 31	Colchester United	1–0	Newport County	Colchester
	Bobby Hill	Report		Stadium: Layer Road; Attendance: 9,705

9 February 1957 32	Shrewsbury Town	1–3	Colchester United	Shrewsbury
	Unknown goalscorer	Report	Plant; Williams	Stadium: Gay Meadow; Attendance: 11,151

16 February 1957 33	Colchester United	0–0	Ipswich Town	Colchester
		Report; Report		Stadium: Layer Road; Attendance: 18,559; Referee: J. Barradell

23 February 1957 34	Bournemouth & Boscombe Athletic	1–1	Colchester United	Bournemouth
	Unknown goalscorer	Report	Fenton	Stadium: Dean Court; Attendance: 21,239

2 March 1957 35	Colchester United	2–1	Torquay United	Colchester
	Plant	Report	Unknown goalscorer	Stadium: Layer Road; Attendance: 12,555

9 March 1957 36	Watford	0–0	Colchester United	Watford
		Report		Stadium: Vicarage Road; Attendance: 10,434

16 March 1957 37	Colchester United	0–0	Brighton & Hove Albion	Colchester
		Report		Stadium: Layer Road; Attendance: 10,459

23 March 1957 38	Gillingham	1–2	Colchester United	Gillingham
	Unknown goalscorer	Report	Own goal o.g.' Plant	Stadium: Priestfield Stadium; Attendance: 9,981

30 March 1957 39	Colchester United	1–1	Swindon Town	Colchester
	P. Wright	Report; Report	Richards	Stadium: Layer Road; Attendance: 9,275

6 April 1957 40	Brentford	1–1	Colchester United	Brentford
	Taylor	Report	Fenton	Stadium: Griffin Park; Attendance: 12,869

13 April 1957 41	Colchester United	1–1	Aldershot	Colchester
	Fenton pen.'	Report	Unknown goalscorer	Stadium: Layer Road; Attendance: 8,975

19 April 1957 42	Colchester United	2–1	Walsall	Colchester
	Fenton pen.' Bobby Hill	Report	Unknown goalscorer	Stadium: Layer Road; Attendance: 12,770

20 April 1957 43	Millwall	3–1	Colchester United	New Cross
	Pacey; Summersby	Report	Plant	Stadium: The Den; Attendance: 14,273

22 April 1957 44	Walsall	2–1	Colchester United	Walsall
	Unknown goalscorer	Report	Smith	Stadium: Fellows Park; Attendance: 9,400

27 April 1957 45	Swindon Town	4–1	Colchester United	Swindon
	Micklewright; O'Mahoney	Report; Report	Plant	Stadium: County Ground; Attendance: 9,551

29 April 1957 46	Colchester United	2–0	Watford	Colchester
	Bert Hill; McCurley	Report		Stadium: Layer Road; Attendance: 9,226

=== FA Cup ===
17 November 1956 1st round	Colchester United	1–4	Southend United	Colchester
	McCurley	Report; Report	Hollis; McCrory	Stadium: Layer Road; Attendance: 11,280

== Squad statistics ==
=== Appearances and goals ===
No.	Pos	Nat	Player	Total		Third Division South		FA Cup	
No.	Pos	Nat	Player	Apps	Goals	Apps	Goals	Apps	Goals
	GK	(England) ENG	Percy Ames	47	0	46	0	1	0
	DF	(England) ENG	George Fisher	46	2	45	2	1	0
	DF	(Scotland) SCO	John Fowler	44	1	43	1	1	0
	DF	(Scotland) SCO	Chic Milligan	35	1	34	1	1	0
	DF	(England) ENG	Reg Stewart	13	0	13	0	0	0
	MF	(England) ENG	Benny Fenton	39	8	38	8	1	0
	MF	(England) ENG	Bert Hill	15	1	15	1	0	0
	MF	(England) ENG	Derek Parker	6	0	6	0	0	0
	FW	(England) ENG	Les Barrell	4	1	4	1	0	0
	FW	(England) ENG	Russell Blake	2	0	2	0	0	0
	FW	(Scotland) SCO	Bobby Hill	39	7	38	7	1	0
	FW	(England) ENG	Martyn King	3	1	3	1	0	0
	FW	(England) ENG	Kevin McCurley	32	10	31	9	1	1
	FW	(Scotland) SCO	Sammy McLeod	4	2	4	2	0	0
	FW	(England) ENG	Ken Plant	47	24	46	24	1	0
	FW	(England) ENG	Eddie Smith	36	13	35	13	1	0
	FW	(England) ENG	Tommy Williams	23	3	23	3	0	0
	FW	(England) ENG	Peter Wright	45	8	44	8	1	0
Players who appeared for Colchester who left during the season
	DF	(England) ENG	John Harrison	3	0	3	0	0	0
	MF	(England) ENG	Bob Dale	34	2	33	2	1	0

=== Goalscorers ===
Place	Nationality	Position	Name	Third Division South	FA Cup	Total
1	(England)	CF	Ken Plant	24	0	24
2	(England)	IF	Eddie Smith	13	0	13
3	(England)	CF	Kevin McCurley	9	1	10
4	(England)	WH	Benny Fenton	8	0	8
4	(England)	WG	Peter Wright	8	0	8
6	(Scotland)	IF	Bobby Hill	7	0	7
7	(England)	WG	Tommy Williams	3	0	3
8	(England)	WH	Bob Dale	2	0	2
8	(England)	FB	George Fisher	2	0	2
8	(Scotland)	IF	Sammy McLeod	2	0	2
11	(Scotland)	FB	John Fowler	1	0	1
11	(England)	WH	Bert Hill	1	0	1
11	(Scotland)	CB	Chic Milligan	1	0	1
11	(England)	WG	Les Barrell	1	0	1
11	(England)	CF	Martyn King	1	0	1
			Own goals	1	0	1
			TOTALS	83	1	84

=== Clean sheets ===
Number of games goalkeepers kept a clean sheet.

Place	Nationality	Player	Third Division South	FA Cup	Total
1	(England)	Percy Ames	13	0	13
		TOTALS	13	0	13

=== Player debuts ===
Players making their first-team Colchester United debut in a fully competitive match.

Position	Nationality	Player	Date	Opponent	Ground	Notes
CB	(Scotland)	Chic Milligan	18 August 1956	Southend United	Layer Road	
WG	(England)	Les Barrell	18 August 1956	Southend United	Layer Road	
IF	(England)	Eddie Smith	18 August 1956	Southend United	Layer Road	
CF	(England)	Martyn King	27 August 1956	Crystal Palace	Layer Road	
WG	(England)	Tommy Williams	24 November 1956	Brentford	Layer Road	
WH	(England)	Derek Parker	13 April 1957	Aldershot	Layer Road	

== See also ==
- List of Colchester United F.C. seasons
