= 1959–60 Colchester United F.C. season =

Colchester United
1959–60 season
- Chairman: Bill Allen
- Manager: Benny Fenton
- Stadium: Layer Road
- Third Division: 9th
- FA Cup: 1st round (eliminated by Queens Park Rangers)
- Top goalscorer: League: Martyn King (30); All: Martyn King (30)
- Highest home attendance: 13,053 v Norwich City, 20 February 1960
- Lowest home attendance: 5,215 v Accrington Stanley, 30 April 1960
- Average home league attendance: 7,856
- Biggest win: 4–0 v Tranmere Rovers, 5 March 1960; 5–1 v Accrington Stanley, 30 April 1960
- Biggest defeat: 1–4 v Grimsby Town, 1 September 1959; 1–4 v Shrewsbury Town, 19 September 1959
Home colours

The 1959–60 season marked Colchester United's 18th year in existence and their tenth season in the third tier of English football, the Third Division. In addition to competing in the Third Division, the club took part in the FA Cup, where they were eliminated by league rivals Queens Park Rangers in the first round. Colchester ended the season in ninth place in the Third Division.

== Season overview ==
Colchester's first game under floodlights at Layer Road was on 24 August 1959 when 9,689 watched the 2–2 draw with Grimsby Town. The ground became something of a fortress, with only two losses recorded during the campaign. However, Colchester struggled on their travels, earning just three wins. The mixed form led to a ninth position finish in the Third Division table.

The most notable bonus for the season was Martyn King's completion of national service meaning he was available for every game. Appearing in 40 matches, forward King equalled Kevin McCurley's club record of 30 Football League goals in a single season, which included three hat-tricks.

== Players ==
As of match played 30 April 1960.

Name	Position	Nationality	Place of birth	Date of birth	Apps	Goals	Signed from	Date signed	Fee
Goalkeepers
Percy Ames	GK	(England)	Plymouth	13 December 1931 (aged 27)	191	0	(England) Tottenham Hotspur	1 May 1955	Free transfer
John Wright	GK	(England)	Aldershot	13 August 1933 (aged 25)	4	0	(England) Colchester Casuals	23 May 1952	Free transfer
Defenders
George Fisher	FB	(England)	Bermondsey	19 June 1925 (aged 33)	169	5	(England) Fulham	1 September 1955	£1,000
John Fowler	FB	(Scotland)	Leith	17 October 1933 (aged 25)	154	3	(Scotland) Bonnyrigg Rose Athletic	20 August 1955 (Note: Date of signing refers to the date of the player's first game for the club)	Free transfer
John Laidlaw	FB	(England)	Aldershot	5 July 1936 (aged 22)	0	0	(Scotland) Easthouses Lily Miners Welfare	June 1957	Free transfer
Alf Marshall	FB	(England)	Dagenham	21 May 1933 (aged 26)	24	0	(England) Dagenham	14 October 1957	£25
Tommy Millar	FB	(Scotland)	Edinburgh	3 December 1938 (aged 20)	0	0	(Scotland) Bo'ness United	July 1959	Free transfer
Chic Milligan	CB	(Scotland)	Ardrossan	26 July 1930 (aged 28)	112	2	(Scotland) Ardrossan Winton Rovers	18 August 1956	£1,000
Edgar Rumney	FB	(England)	Abberton	15 September 1936 (aged 22)	5	0	(England) Colchester Casuals	1 May 1957	Free transfer
Midfielders
Cyril Hammond	WH	(England)	Woolwich	10 October 1927 (aged 31)	37	0	(England) Charlton Athletic	July 1958	Free transfer
Trevor Harris	WH	(England)	Colchester	6 February 1936 (aged 23)	11	0	Amateur	July 1951	Free transfer
Ron Hunt	WH	(England)	Colchester	26 September 1933 (aged 25)	59	0	Amateur	October 1951	Free transfer
Derek Parker	WH	(England)	Wivenhoe	23 June 1926 (aged 32)	80	1	(England) West Ham United	March 1957	£2,500
Forwards
John Baines	CF	(England)	Colchester	25 September 1937 (aged 21)	0	0	(England) Colchester Casuals	January 1960	Free transfer
Russell Blake	WG	(England)	Colchester	24 July 1935 (aged 23)	44	7	(England) Dedham Old Boys	8 September 1955	Free transfer
John Evans	IF	(England)	Tilbury	28 August 1929 (aged 29)	55	23	(England) Liverpool	23 November 1957	£4,000
Bobby Hill	IF	(Scotland)	Edinburgh	9 June 1938 (aged 20)	62	9	(Scotland) Easthouses Lily Miners Welfare	9 June 1955	Free transfer
Tony Howe	WG	(England)	Colchester	14 February 1939 (aged 20)	0	0	(England) Colchester Casuals	March 1960	Free transfer
Bobby Hunt	FW	(England)	Colchester	1 October 1942 (aged 16)	0	0	Amateur	March 1960	Free transfer
Martyn King	CF	(England)	Birmingham	23 August 1937 (aged 21)	6	1	Amateur	Summer 1955	Free transfer
Neil Langman	CF	(England)	Bere Alston	21 February 1932 (aged 27)	73	35	(England) Plymouth Argyle	November 1957	£6,750
Kevin McCurley	CF	(England)	Consett	2 April 1926 (aged 33)	225	91	(England) Liverpool	June 1951	£750
Sammy McLeod	IF	(Scotland)	Glasgow	4 January 1934 (aged 25)	107	16	(Scotland) Easthouses Lily Miners Welfare	20 August 1955	Free transfer
Tony Miller	IF	(England)	Chelmsford	26 October 1937 (aged 21)	0	0	Amateur	May 1958	Free transfer
Tommy Williams	WG	(England)	Battersea	10 February 1935 (aged 24)	82	14	(England) Carshalton Athletic	September 1956	Free transfer
Peter Wright	WG	(England)	Colchester	26 January 1934 (aged 25)	253	51	Amateur	November 1951	Free transfer

== Transfers ==
=== In ===
Date	Position	Nationality	Name	From	Fee	Ref.
July 1959	FB	(Scotland)	Tommy Millar	(Scotland) Bo'ness United	Free transfer	
January 1960	CF	(England)	John Baines	(England) Colchester Casuals	Free transfer	
March 1960	WG	(England)	Tony Howe	(England) Colchester Casuals	Free transfer	
March 1960	FW	(England)	Bobby Hunt	Amateur	Free transfer	

=== Out ===
Date	Position	Nationality	Name	To	Fee	Ref.
July 1959	CF	(England)	Ken Plant	(England) Nuneaton Borough	Free transfer	
29 August 1959	IF	(Scotland)	Ian Johnstone	(England) Clacton Town	Free transfer	(Note: Date of departure refers to the date of the player's final game for the club)
6 October 1959	FB	(Scotland)	John Roe	(Scotland) Dundee United	Free transfer	
Spring 1960	CB	(England)	Brian Dobson	(England) Clacton Town	Released	

== Match details ==
=== Third Division ===
==== Results round by round ====
Round	1	2	3	4	5	6	7	8	9	10	11	12	13	14	15	16	17	18	19	20	21	22	23	24	25	26	27	28	29	30	31	32	33	34	35	36	37	38	39	40	41	42	43	44	45	46
Ground	A	H	H	A	A	H	H	A	A	H	H	A	A	A	H	H	A	H	A	H	H	A	A	H	A	H	A	A	A	H	H	A	H	A	H	A	H	H	A	H	A	H	H	A	A	H
Result	L	D	D	L	L	W	W	L	L	W	W	W	L	L	W	W	D	L	D	W	D	W	W	W	L	W	L	D	L	D	W	D	W	D	W	L	D	D	L	W	L	L	W	L	L	W
Position	19	17	18	20	20	19	16	17	18	18	14	11	16	16	14	13	12	14	15	12	12	10	9	8	8	8	8	8	11	8	8	8	6	6	5	7	8	5	8	7	9	9	9	9	9	9

Source: 11v11.com
A = Away; H = Home; W = Win; D = Draw; L = Loss

==== League table ====
Pos	Team	Pld	W	D	L	GF	GA	GAv	Pts
7	Bury	46	21	9	16	64	51	1.255	51
8	Queens Park Rangers	46	18	13	15	73	54	1.352	49
9	Colchester United	46	18	11	17	83	74	1.122	47
10	Bournemouth & Boscombe Athletic	46	17	13	16	72	72	1.000	47
11	Reading	46	18	10	18	84	77	1.091	46

==== Matches ====
22 August 1959 1	Bury	3–1	Colchester United	Bury
	Unknown goalscorer	Report	Langman	Stadium: Gigg Lane; Attendance: 11,509

24 August 1959 2	Colchester United	2–2	Grimsby Town	Colchester
	McLeod	Report	Unknown goalscorer	Stadium: Layer Road; Attendance: 9,689

29 August 1959 3	Colchester United	2–2	Barnsley	Colchester
	Fisher; Williams	Report	Unknown goalscorer	Stadium: Layer Road; Attendance: 8,246

1 September 1959 4	Grimsby Town	4–1	Colchester United	Cleethorpes
	Unknown goalscorer	Report	P. Wright	Stadium: Blundell Park; Attendance: 14,000

5 September 1959 5	Southampton	4–2	Colchester United	Southampton
	Paine; Huxford; Mulgrew; Reeves	Report	King; Williams	Stadium: The Dell; Attendance: 14,704

7 September 1959 6	Colchester United	1–0	Halifax Town	Colchester
	Williams	Report		Stadium: Layer Road; Attendance: 8,305

12 September 1959 7	Colchester United	4–2	Reading	Colchester
	King; Langman; P. Wright	Report	Unknown goalscorer	Stadium: Layer Road; Attendance: 7,683

14 September 1959 8	Halifax Town	3–2	Colchester United	Halifax
	Unknown goalscorer	Report	King; McLeod	Stadium: The Shay; Attendance: 5,865

19 September 1959 9	Shrewsbury Town	4–1	Colchester United	Shrewsbury
	Unknown goalscorer	Report	Langman	Stadium: Gay Meadow; Attendance: 9,068

21 September 1959 10	Colchester United	3–0	Mansfield Town	Colchester
	Own goal (o.g.); King	Report		Stadium: Layer Road; Attendance: 8,202

26 September 1959 11	Colchester United	3–1	Port Vale	Colchester
	King	Report	Poole	Stadium: Layer Road; Attendance: 7,822

28 September 1959 12	Mansfield Town	1–3	Colchester United	Mansfield
	Unknown goalscorer	Report	King	Stadium: Field Mill; Attendance: 5,406

3 October 1959 13	Norwich City	3–2	Colchester United	Norwich
	Unknown goalscorer	Report	Milligan; Langman	Stadium: Carrow Road; Attendance: 27,759

6 October 1959 14	Brentford	2–0	Colchester United	Brentford
	Francis; Towers	Report		Stadium: Griffin Park; Attendance: 14,750

10 October 1959 15	Colchester United	3–1	Wrexham	Colchester
	Hill; Evans; Langman	Report	Unknown goalscorer	Stadium: Layer Road; Attendance: 7,683

12 October 1959 16	Colchester United	2–1	Brentford	Colchester
	Langman; P. Wright	Report	Francis	Stadium: Layer Road; Attendance: 7,790

17 October 1959 17	Tranmere Rovers	1–1	Colchester United	Birkenhead
	Unknown goalscorer	Report	Langman	Stadium: Prenton Park; Attendance: 8,532

24 October 1959 18	Colchester United	1–2	Bournemouth & Boscombe Athletic	Colchester
	Williams	Report	Unknown goalscorer	Stadium: Layer Road; Attendance: 7,938

31 October 1959 19	Bradford City	0–0	Colchester United	Bradford
		Report		Stadium: Valley Parade; Attendance: 8,436

7 November 1959 20	Colchester United	2–1	Newport County	Colchester
	P. Wright; Williams	Report	McSeveney	Stadium: Layer Road; Attendance: 6,620

21 November 1959 21	Colchester United	0–0	Swindon Town	Colchester
		Report; Report		Stadium: Layer Road; Attendance: 6,537; Referee: K. Stokes

28 November 1959 22	York City	2–3	Colchester United	York
	Unknown goalscorer	Report	McCurley (pen.); King	Stadium: Bootham Crescent; Attendance: 6,881

12 December 1959 23	Accrington Stanley	1–2	Colchester United	Accrington
	Unknown goalscorer	Report	McCurley	Stadium: Peel Park; Attendance: 2,116

19 December 1959 24	Colchester United	3–0	Bury	Colchester
	McCurley; King; Williams	Report		Stadium: Layer Road; Attendance: 5,503

26 December 1959 25	Queens Park Rangers	3–1	Colchester United	Shepherd's Bush
	Unknown goalscorer	Report	McCurley	Stadium: Loftus Road; Attendance: 6,480

28 December 1959 26	Colchester United	2–0	Queens Park Rangers	Colchester
	McCurley; P. Wright	Report		Stadium: Layer Road; Attendance: 9,095

2 January 1960 27	Barnsley	2–1	Colchester United	Barnsley
	Unknown goalscorer	Report	King	Stadium: Oakwell; Attendance: 5,526

9 January 1960 28	Chesterfield	1–1	Colchester United	Chesterfield
	Whitehurst	Report	P. Wright	Stadium: Saltergate; Attendance: 5,193

23 January 1960 29	Reading	2–1	Colchester United	Reading
	Unknown goalscorer	Report	King	Stadium: Elm Park; Attendance: 7,486

30 January 1960 30	Colchester United	0–0	Coventry City	Colchester
		Report		Stadium: Layer Road; Attendance: 7,200

6 February 1960 31	Colchester United	3–2	Shrewsbury Town	Colchester
	Hill; Williams	Report	Unknown goalscorer	Stadium: Layer Road; Attendance: 7,144

13 February 1960 32	Port Vale	1–1	Colchester United	Burslem
	Donaldson	Report	King	Stadium: Vale Park; Attendance: 10,248

20 February 1960 33	Colchester United	3–0	Norwich City	Colchester
	King 1'	Report		Stadium: Layer Road; Attendance: 13,053

27 February 1960 34	Wrexham	1–1	Colchester United	Wrexham
	Unknown goalscorer	Report	King	Stadium: Racecourse Ground; Attendance: 8,836

5 March 1960 35	Colchester United	4–0	Tranmere Rovers	Colchester
	King 2'; Blake 30'; Hammond 65' (pen.); Hill 70'	Report		Stadium: Layer Road; Attendance: 6,857

12 March 1960 36	Bournemouth & Boscombe Athletic	3–2	Colchester United	Bournemouth
	Unknown goalscorer	Report	King	Stadium: Dean Court; Attendance: 9,256

19 March 1960 37	Colchester United	2–2	York City	Colchester
	King 21'; B. Hunt 86'	Report	Wilkinson 48'; Laidlaw 81' (o.g.)	Stadium: Layer Road; Attendance: 6,599

21 March 1960 38	Colchester United	1–1	Southampton	Colchester
	Laidlaw 29'	Report	Reeves 43'	Stadium: Layer Road; Attendance: 10,105

26 March 1960 39	Newport County	3–2	Colchester United	Newport
	McPherson; Singer	Report	King; P. Wright	Stadium: Somerton Park; Attendance: 4,332

2 April 1960 40	Colchester United	1–0	Chesterfield	Colchester
	King	Report		Stadium: Layer Road; Attendance: 6,079

9 April 1960 41	Swindon Town	4–3	Colchester United	Swindon
	Morgan 16'; Summerbee 22'; Gauld 37', 58'	Report; Report	P. Wright 33'; Williams 63'; King 80'	Stadium: County Ground; Attendance: 7,342; Referee: L. Callaghan

15 April 1960 42	Colchester United	2–3	Southend United	Colchester
	King; P. Wright	Report; Report	Corthine; Price	Stadium: Layer Road; Attendance: 10,317

16 April 1960 43	Colchester United	2–1	Bradford City	Colchester
	Langman	Report	Unknown goalscorer	Stadium: Layer Road; Attendance: 5,765

18 April 1960 44	Southend United	1–0	Colchester United	Southend-on-Sea
	Corthine	Report; Report		Stadium: Roots Hall; Attendance: 12,533

23 April 1960 45	Coventry City	3–1	Colchester United	Coventry
	Hewitt; Unknown goalscorer	Report	P. Wright	Stadium: Highfield Road; Attendance: 8,382

30 April 1960 46	Colchester United	5–1	Accrington Stanley	Colchester
	King; Langman; P. Wright; Williams	Report	Unknown goalscorer	Stadium: Layer Road; Attendance: 5,215

=== FA Cup ===
14 November 1959 1st round	Colchester United	2–3	Queens Park Rangers	Colchester
	McCurley 75'; P. Wright 84'	Report	Petchey 29'; Bedford 42'; Angell 61'	Stadium: Layer Road; Attendance: 8,860

== Squad statistics ==
=== Appearances and goals ===
No.	Pos	Nat	Player	Total		Third Division		FA Cup	
No.	Pos	Nat	Player	Apps	Goals	Apps	Goals	Apps	Goals
	GK	(England) ENG	Percy Ames	47	0	46	0	1	0
	DF	(England) ENG	George Fisher	3	1	3	1	0	0
	DF	(Scotland) SCO	John Fowler	47	0	46	0	1	0
	DF	(England) ENG	John Laidlaw	40	1	39	1	1	0
	DF	(England) ENG	Alf Marshall	5	0	5	0	0	0
	DF	(Scotland) SCO	Tommy Millar	5	0	5	0	0	0
	DF	(Scotland) SCO	Chic Milligan	44	1	43	1	1	0
	MF	(England) ENG	Cyril Hammond	44	1	43	1	1	0
	MF	(England) ENG	Ron Hunt	3	0	3	0	0	0
	MF	(England) ENG	Derek Parker	44	0	43	0	1	0
	FW	(England) ENG	Russell Blake	11	1	11	1	0	0
	FW	(England) ENG	John Evans	5	1	5	1	0	0
	FW	(Scotland) SCO	Bobby Hill	39	4	38	4	1	0
	FW	(England) ENG	Bobby Hunt	1	1	1	1	0	0
	FW	(England) ENG	Martyn King	40	30	39	30	1	0
	FW	(England) ENG	Neil Langman	27	11	27	11	0	0
	FW	(England) ENG	Kevin McCurley	12	8	11	7	1	1
	FW	(Scotland) SCO	Sammy McLeod	12	3	12	3	0	0
	FW	(England) ENG	Tommy Williams	36	9	35	9	1	0
	FW	(England) ENG	Peter Wright	47	12	46	11	1	1
Players who appeared for Colchester who left during the season
	DF	(England) ENG	Brian Dobson	2	0	2	0	0	0
	DF	(Scotland) SCO	John Roe	2	0	2	0	0	0
	FW	(Scotland) SCO	Ian Johnstone	1	0	1	0	0	0

=== Goalscorers ===
Place	Nationality	Position	Name	Third Division	FA Cup	Total
1	(England)	CF	Martyn King	30	0	30
2	(England)	WG	Peter Wright	11	1	12
3	(England)	CF	Neil Langman	11	0	11
4	(England)	WG	Tommy Williams	9	0	9
5	(England)	CF	Kevin McCurley	7	1	8
6	(Scotland)	IF	Bobby Hill	4	0	4
7	(Scotland)	IF	Sammy McLeod	3	0	3
8	(England)	WG	Russell Blake	1	0	1
8	(England)	IF	John Evans	1	0	1
8	(England)	FB	George Fisher	1	0	1
8	(England)	WH	Cyril Hammond	1	0	1
8	(England)	FW	Bobby Hunt	1	0	1
8	(England)	FB	John Laidlaw	1	0	1
8	(Scotland)	CB	Chic Milligan	1	0	1
			Own goals	1	0	1
			TOTALS	83	2	85

=== Clean sheets ===
Number of games goalkeepers kept a clean sheet.

Place	Nationality	Player	Third Division	FA Cup	Total
1	(England)	Percy Ames	10	0	10
		TOTALS	10	0	10

=== Player debuts ===
Players making their first-team Colchester United debut in a fully competitive match.

Position	Nationality	Player	Date	Opponent	Ground	Notes
FB	(Scotland)	Tommy Millar	1 September 1959	Grimsby Town	Blundell Park	
FB	(England)	John Laidlaw	5 September 1959	Southampton	The Dell	
FB	(Scotland)	John Roe	3 October 1959	Norwich City	Carrow Road	
FW	(England)	Bobby Hunt	19 March 1960	York City	Layer Road	

== See also ==
- List of Colchester United F.C. seasons
