= List of Colchester United F.C. players =

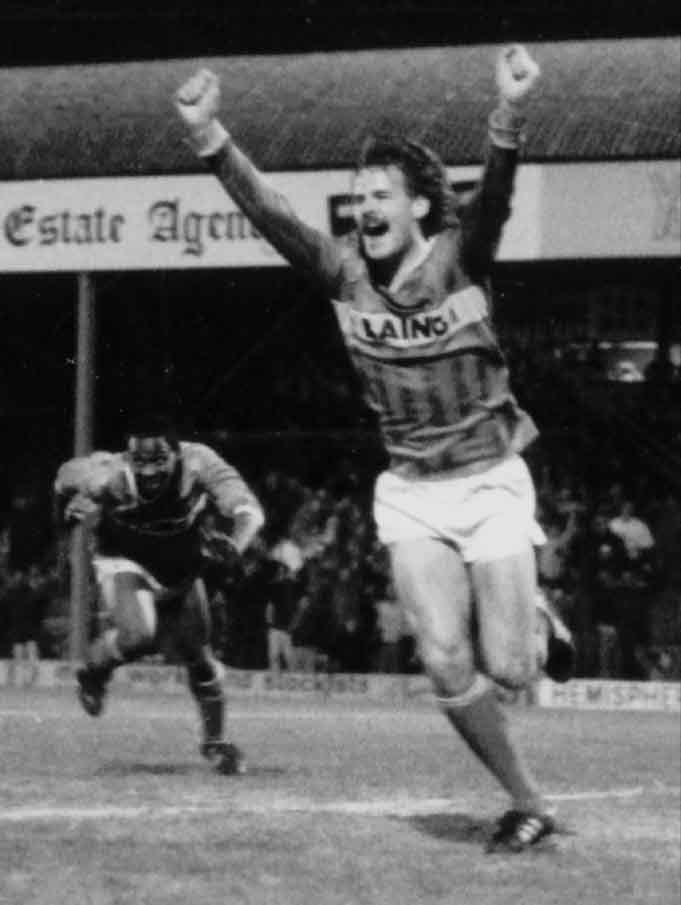
Former Colchester United player-manager Roy McDonough, who guided the club to the Conference title in 1992.

Colchester United Football Club is an English football club based in Colchester, Essex. Formed in 1937, the club competed in the Southern Football League from their foundation until 1950, when they were elected to the Football League. The club spent eleven years in the Third Division South and Third Division following the league's reorganisation in 1958, with a best finish of third place in 1957, one point behind rivals Ipswich Town and Torquay United. Colchester suffered their first relegation in 1961 as they finished 23rd in the Third Division, but spent just one season in the Fourth Division as they were promoted in second position, behind Millwall by just one point. This trend of relegation followed by promotion continued over the next few decades, before the club were eventually relegated from the Football League to the Conference in 1990.

Player-manager Roy McDonough guided the club back to the Football League in 1992, winning the non-league double of the Conference title and the FA Trophy. The club then won promotion to the Second Division in 1998 with a 1–0 Third Division play-off final win at Wembley against Torquay United. The club were again promoted in the 2005–06 season under the stewardship of Phil Parkinson, gaining the opportunity to play second-tier football for the first time in their history. After two seasons in the Championship, Colchester were relegated back to League One. Colchester were relegated to the fourth tier for the first time in 18-years at the end of the 2015–16 season.

Colchester United's first team have competed in a number of professional competitions, and all players who have played in 100 or more of these matches, either as a member of the starting line-up or as a substitute, are listed below. Each player's details include the duration of his Colchester United career, his usual playing position while employed by the club, the number of matches started, the number of substitute appearances and total number of appearances, their total goals scored and total numbers of yellow and red cards collected. The players are sorted by total number of appearances, then by number of starts, then by player name in alphabetical order.

== Introduction ==
Micky Cook holds the record for total appearances and starts for Colchester United, with 700 first team appearances made between 1969 and 1984, starting 696 games and making four substitute appearances. In second position is Welsh goalkeeper Mike Walker, who between 1973 and 1983 made 524 starts with no substitute appearances.

The club's goalscoring record is held by Tony Adcock, who scored 149 goals in all competitions in two spells, his first between 1981 and 1987, and his second between 1995 and 1998. He made 338 starts and 51 substitute appearances. Martyn King is the club's record league goalscorer, netting 131 times in 212 league games between 1956 and 1964. He scored 140 goals in all competitions in 230 games during his time with Colchester.

== Key ==
Player

- Players highlighted in yellow are registered Colchester United players for the 2016–17 season.
- Players marked in italics were on loan from another club for the duration of their Colchester United career. The loaning club(s) are noted in the reference column.

Positions key
Pre-1960s		1960s–	
GK	Goalkeeper		
FB	Full back	DF	Defender
HB	Half-back	MF	Midfielder
FW	Forward		
U	Utility player		

Position

- Playing positions are listed according to the tactical formations that were employed at the time. The change in the names of defensive and midfield positions reflects the tactical evolution that occurred from the 1960s onwards.

Club career

- Club career is defined as the first and last calendar years in which the player appeared for the club in any of the competitions listed below.

Total starts, Total subs, Total apps, Total goals, Total yellow cards and Total red cards

- Total starts, total subs and total goals are matches a player has started, been brought on as a substitute and the combined total of these figures, the total number of goals scored, and the total number of yellow and red cards received in the following competitions; Southern League, Southern League Mid-Week Section, Southern League Cup, English Football League (including play-offs), Conference, FA Cup, EFL Cup, Associate Members' Cup/Football League Trophy/EFL Trophy, FA Trophy, Bob Lord Trophy and the Watney Cup.

== Players with 100 or more appearances ==
As of match played 26 November 2021

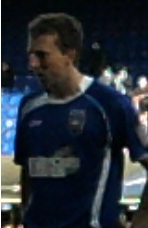
Colchester-born four-time Player of the Year Tom Eastman has played over 400 games for the U's since 2011.

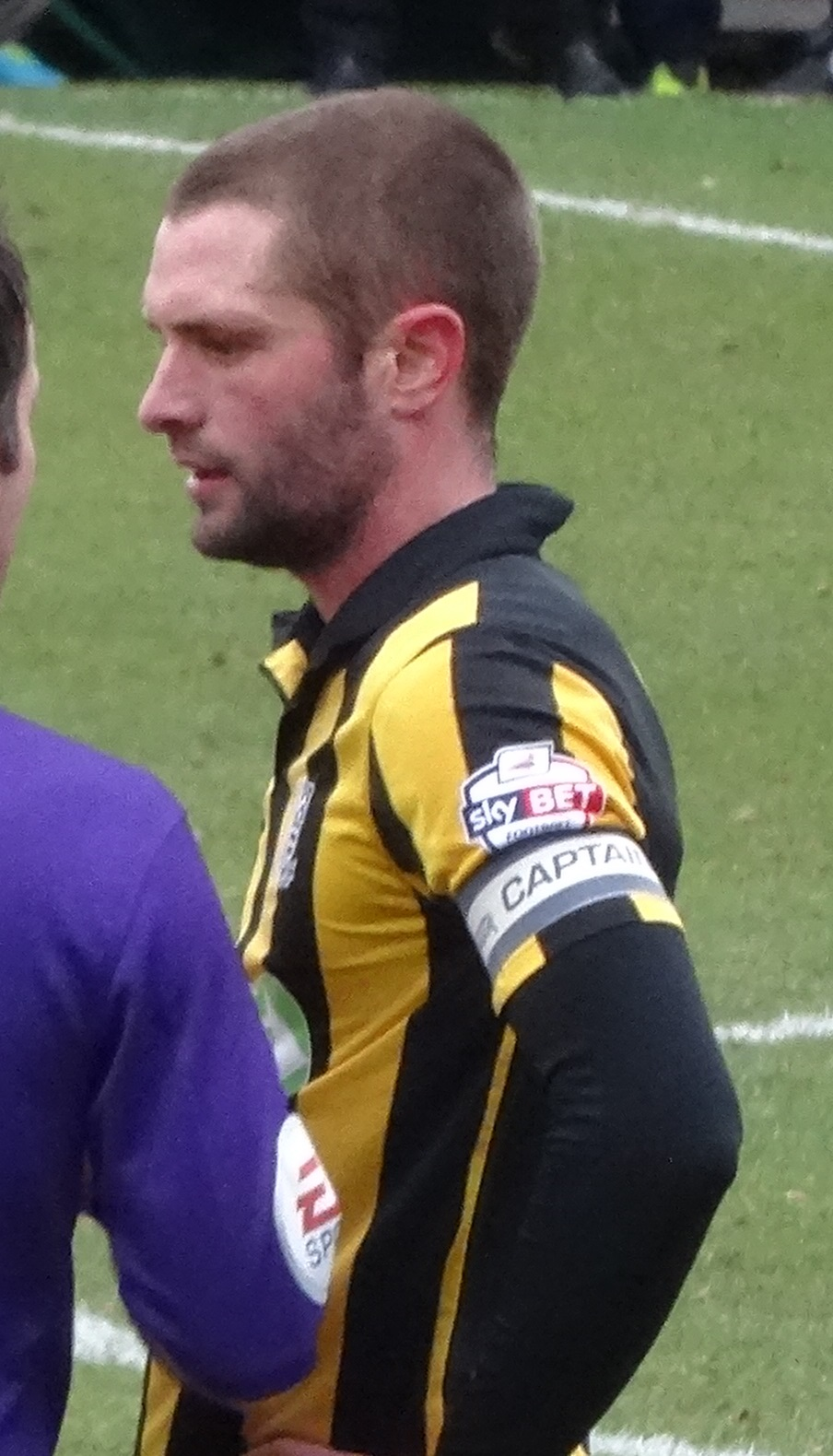
John White started his career with Colchester and made over 250 appearances in nine years with the club.

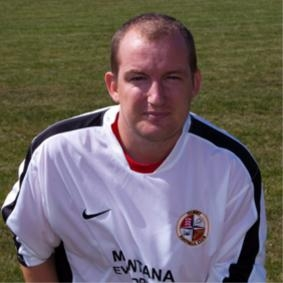
Defender Joe Keith played 246 games for Colchester between 1999 and 2005.

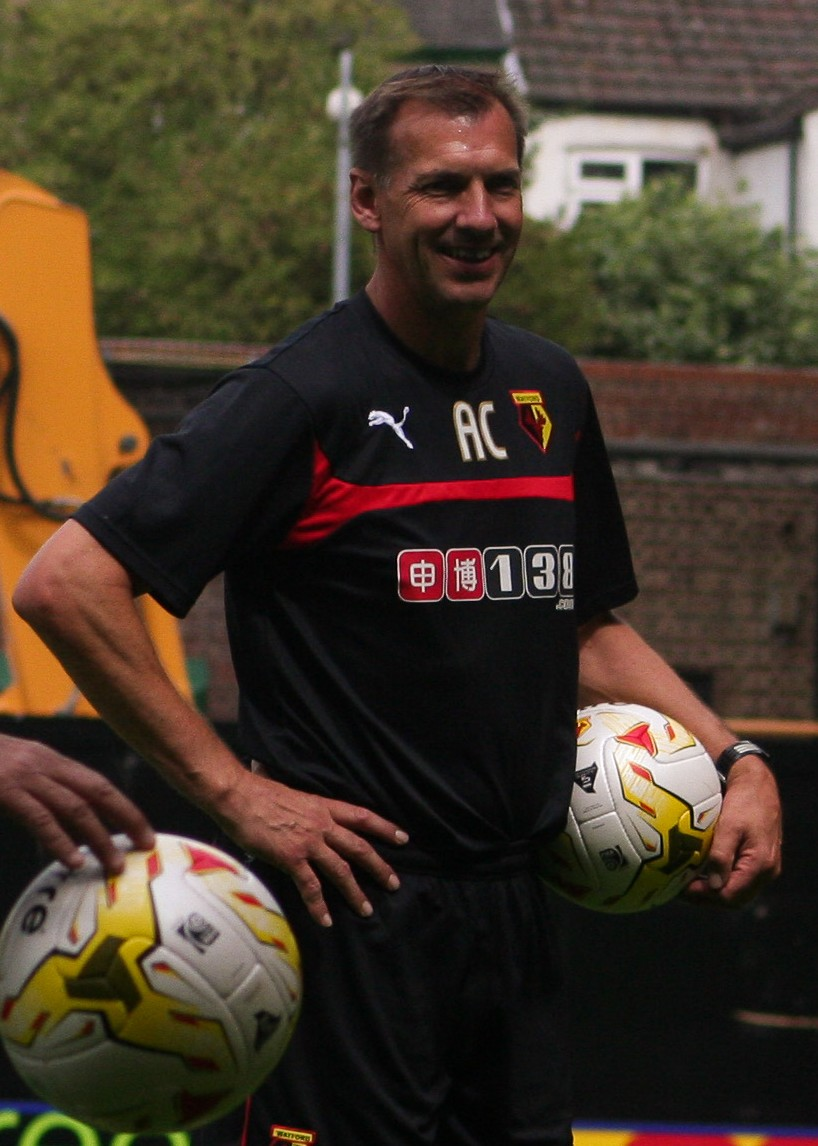
Goalkeeper Alec Chamberlain made 221 appearances for the club between 1983 and 1987.

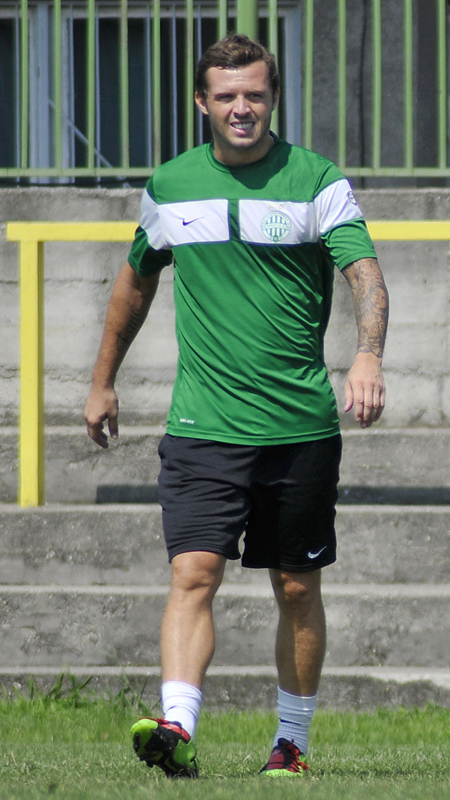
Sam Stockley made 172 appearances for Colchester United in two spells between 2002 and 2006.

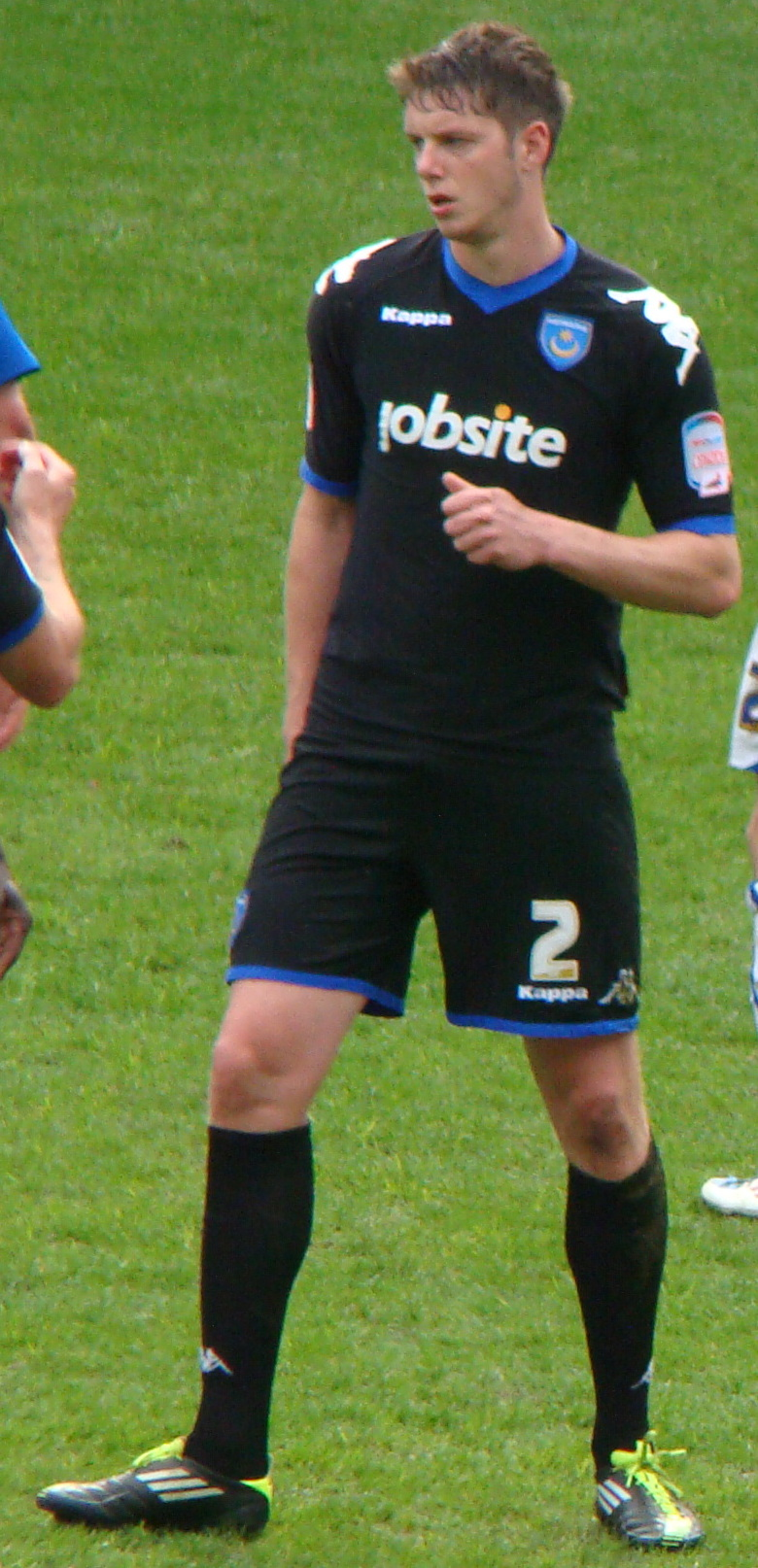
Greg Halford was sold to Reading for a club record £2.5million in January 2007.

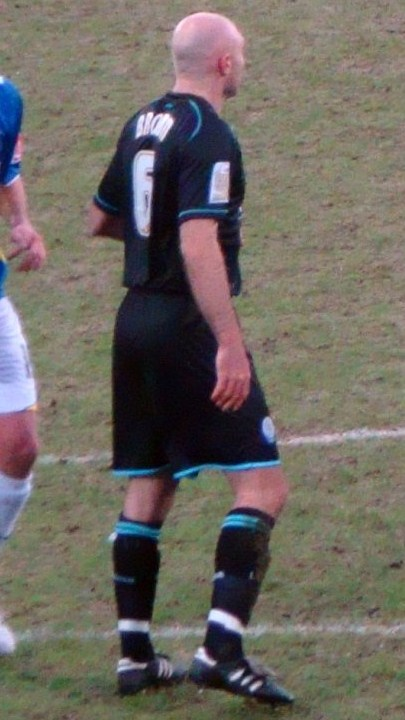
Wayne Brown made 159 appearances for Colchester over three spells and was named Player of the Year in 2006.

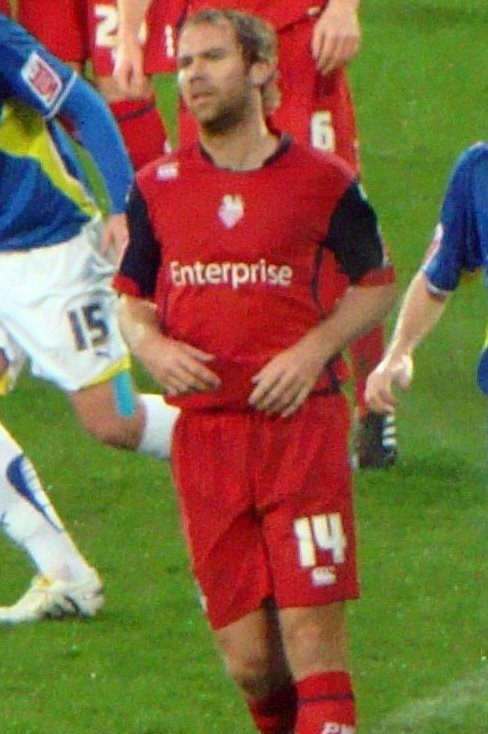
Liam Chilvers made 139 appearances in three spells with Colchester and helped the club to promotion to the Championship in 2006.

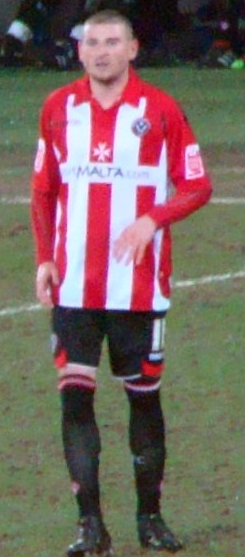
Mark Yeates made 133 appearances in two spells and was Colchester United's top scorer in 2008–09 with 13 goals.

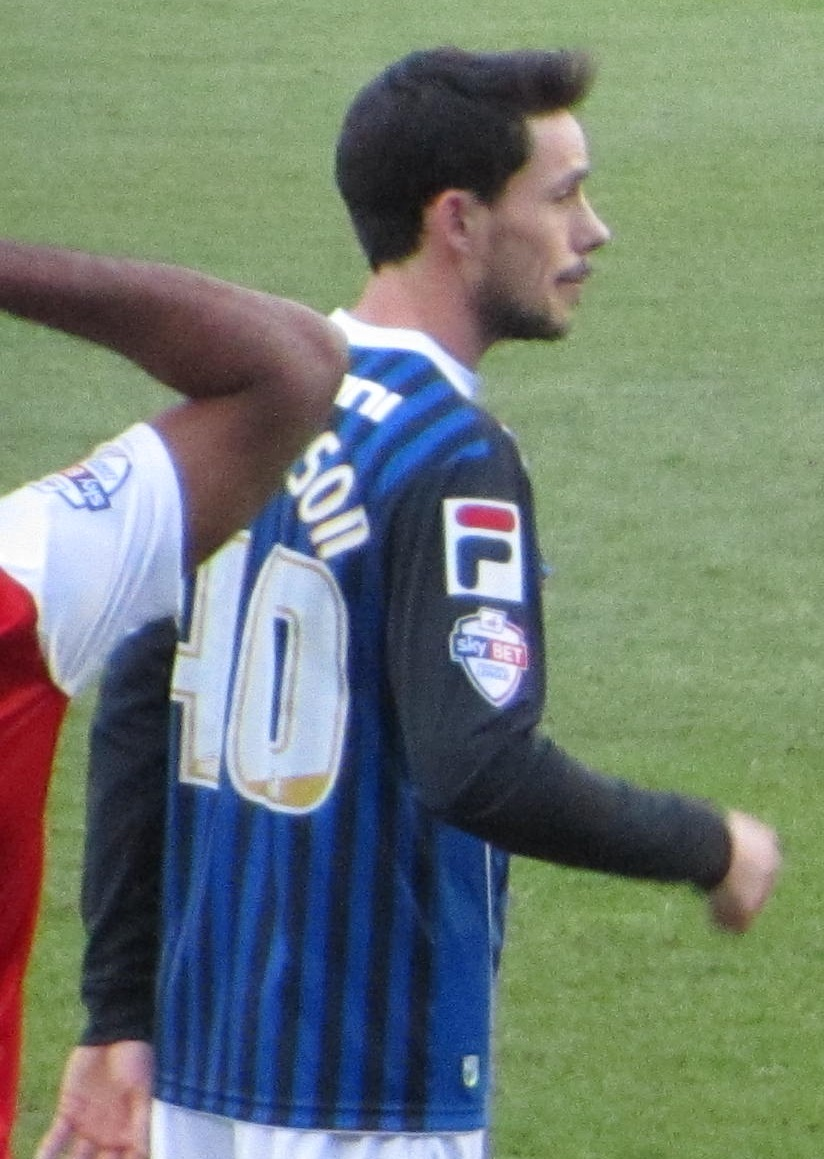
Ian Henderson was sent off on his debut against his former club Norwich City went on to make 129 appearances for the U's.

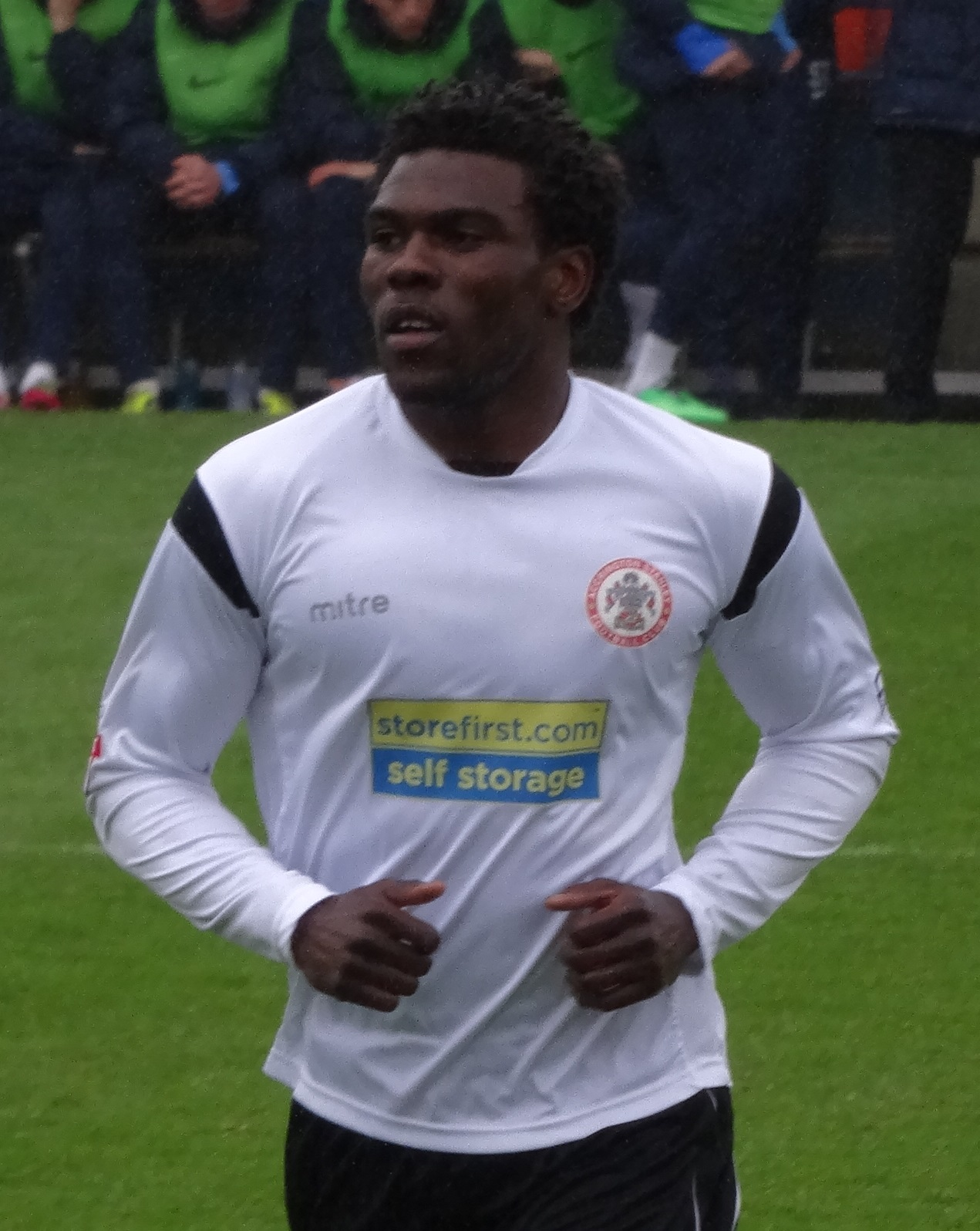
Kayode Odejayi was named Player of the Year for the 2011–12 season.

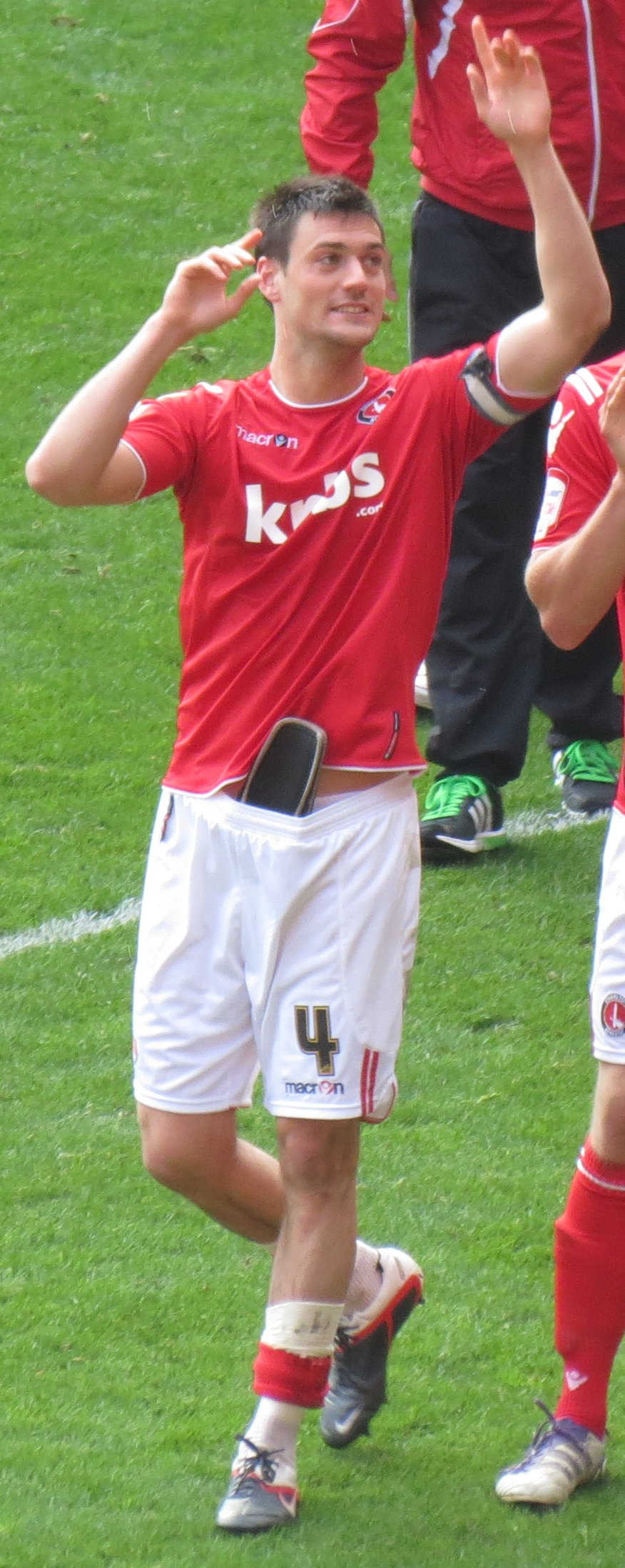
Johnnie Jackson made 123 appearances in two spells for Colchester and was named the Player of the Year in 2008.

Player	Position	Club career	Total starts	Total subs	Total apps	Total goals	Total (yellow card)	Total (red card)	Ref
(England) Micky Cook	FB	1969–1984	696	4	700	24	7	1	
(Wales) Mike Walker	GK	1973–1983	524	0	524	0	0	0	
(England) Tony English	DF	1985–1996	506	11	517	58	8	3	
(England) Steve Leslie	MF	1971–1984	476	27	503	46	2	2	
(England) Kemal Izzet	MF	2001; 2001–2013	420	53	473	21	69	2	
(England) Karl Duguid	U	1995–2008; 2011–2014	376	95	471	48	54	4	
(England) Peter Wright	FW	1952–1964	452	0	452	95	1	0	
(Scotland) John Fowler	FB	1955–1966	442	0	442	5	0	0	
(England) Tom Eastman	DF	2011–	407	23	430	23	46	1	
(England) Percy Ames	GK	1955–1965	422	0	422	0	0	0	
(England) Ian Allinson	FW	1975–1983; 1988–1989	385	24	409	94	1	0	
(England) Mick Packer	FB	1973–1983	385	8	393	22	6	3	
(England) Tony Adcock	FW	1981–1987; 1995–1998	338	51	389	149	7	1	
(England) Brian Hall	FB	1965–1972	359	5	364	36	2	0	
(England) Steve Wignall	DF	1977–1984	331	2	333	27	2	1	
(England) Harry Bearryman	HB	1947–1954	331	0	331	12	0	0	
(England) Richard Wilkins	U	1986–1990; 1996–2000	315	10	325	43	10	0	
(England) Reg Stewart	DF	1949–1957	320	0	320	2	0	1	
(England) Steve Foley	MF	1971–1981	304	10	314	56	1	1	
(Scotland) Duncan Forbes	DF	1962–1968	296	0	296	3	1	0	
(Republic of Ireland) Mark Kinsella	MF	1989–1996	262	21	283	44	2	0	
(England) Roy McDonough	FW	1981–1983; 1990–1994	248	19	267	82	5	4	
(England) Mike Grice	FW	1952–1956; 1962–1966	262	1	263	30	0	0	
(England) David Gregory	MF	1996–2002	244	15	259	28	17	1	
(England) John White	FB	2004–2013	212	43	255	0	18	0	
(Scotland) Bobby Hill	FW	1956–1965	250	0	250	22	0	0	
(England) John Harrison	FB	1950–1956	249	0	249	1	0	0	
(England) Joe Keith	FB	1999–2005	210	36	246	28	13	0	
(England) Roger Osborne	MF	1981–1986	231	11	242	11	0	0	
(England) Pat Baldwin	DF	2002–2012	212	30	242	2	23	2	
(England) Lindsay Smith	DF	1971–1977	205	32	237	19	3	0	
(England) Kevin McCurley	FW	1952–1960	236	0	236	94	0	0	
(England) Bobby Gough	FW	1976–1981	230	2	232	80	2	1	
(England) Martyn King	FW	1956–1964	230	0	230	140	0	1	
(England) Carl Emberson	GK	1992–1993 (Note: On loan from Millwall); 1994–1999	225	1	226	0	4	1	
(England) Simon Betts	FB	1992–1999	215	11	226	13	10	0	
(England) Alec Chamberlain	GK	1983–1987	221	0	221	0	3	0	
(England) Rudi Hedman	DF	1984–1988; 1991 (Note: On loan from Crystal Palace)	207	14	221	13	5	0	
(England) Derek Trevis	MF	1964–1968	217	0	217	16	1	0	
(England) George Wright	GK	1949–1955	217	0	217	0	0	0	
(England) Peter Cawley	DF	1992 (Note: On loan from Barnet); 1992–1998	214	3	217	9	12	3	
(England) Magnus Okuonghae	DF	2009–2015	213	2	215	8	25	4	
(England) Sam Walker	GK	2013 (Note: On loan from Chelsea); 2013–2014; 2014–2018	213	0	213	0	5	0	
(England) Steve McGavin	FW	1991–1994; 1999–2001	177	36	213	66	2	0	
(Scotland) Jimmy Elder	HB	1950–1955	212	0	212	17	0	0	
(England) Bob Curry	FW	1946–1951	206	0	206	105	0	0	
(England) Dean Gerken	GK	2004–2009; 2019–	204	2	206	0	6	1	
(England) Anthony Wordsworth	MF	2007–2013	155	44	199	35	42	0	
(Scotland) Chic Milligan	DF	1956–1961	198	0	198	3	0	0	
(Republic of Ireland) David Greene	DF	1995–1996 (Note: On loan from Luton Town); 1996–2000	196	0	196	18	27	3	
(England) Ken Plant	FW	1954–1958	196	0	196	84	0	0	
(England) Gary Bennett	FW	1988–1993	156	40	196	47	1	0	
(England) Ron Hunt	HB	1952–1963	190	0	190	3	0	0	
(England) Nicky Smith	MF	1990–1994	180	10	190	15	0	0	
(Republic of Ireland) Joe Dunne	FB	1996–1999; 1999–2001	155	33	188	7	23	0	
(England) Steve Dowman	DF	1976–1980	181	5	186	26	0	1	
(England) Scott McGleish	FW	1996 (Note: On loan from Peterborough United); 2001–2004	150	34	184	53	8	0	
(Scotland) Ian Phillips	FB	1983–1987; 1991–1992	178	3	181	10	4	1	
(England) Brian Gibbs	FW	1968–1972	175	4	179	41	4	0	
(England) Paul Abrahams	FW	1991–1995; 1996 (Note: On loan from Brentford); 1996–1999	119	60	179	34	9	0	
(England) Gavin Massey	FW	2012 (Note: On loan from Watford); 2012–2016	146	32	178	21	15	1	
(England) Digger Kettle	FB	1946–1955	175	0	175	2	0	0	
(England) George Fisher	FB	1955–1960	173	0	173	6	0	0	
(England) Sam Stockley	FB	2002 (Note: On loan from Oxford United); 2002–2006	158	14	172	3	17	0	
(England) Tom Lapslie	MF	2015–2021	142	28	170	4	28	2	
(England) Simon Brown	GK	1999–2004	165	2	167	0	3	1	
(England) Gavin Johnson	MF	1999–2005	151	16	167	14	18	0	
(England) Alan White	DF	1999; 2000–2004	152	14	166	4	36	5	
(England) Paul Dyer	MF	1975–1979	143	23	166	4	1	0	
(England) Arthur Turner	FW	1946–1952	165	0	165	98	0	0	
(Scotland) Sammy McLeod	FW	1955–1962	164	0	164	25	0	0	
(England) Brian Wilson	FB	2010–2014	162	1	163	3	29	0	
(England) Greg Halford	FB	2003–2007	157	6	163	24	15	0	
(England) Bobby Hunt	FW	1960–1964	162	0	162	90	0	0	
(England) Sammie Szmodics	MF	2013–2019	118	44	162	38	15	0	
(England) Wayne Brown	DF	1997 (Note: On loan from Ipswich Town); 2004; 2004–2007	154	6	160	5	16	2	
(England) Mick Mahon	FW	1970–1973	153	5	158	32	1	0	
(England) Fred Cutting	FW	1947–1952	157	0	157	70	0	0	
(England) Tommy Williams	FW	1956–1961	157	0	157	33	0	0	
(France) Thomas Pinault	MF	1999–2004	126	31	157	7	17	0	
(England) Kevin Watson	MF	2004–2008	150	4	154	4	7	0	
(Wales) Chris Fry	MF	1993–1997	120	34	154	18	3	1	
(England) Ray Bunkell	MF	1973–1979	140	13	153	10	0	0	
(England) Drey Wright	FW	2012–2018	91	57	148	9	8	0	
(England) Courtney Senior	FW	2017–2021	103	42	145	14	9	0	
(England) Dennis Hillman	FW	1946–1951	141	0	141	27	0	0	
(England) Frankie Kent	DF	2014–2019	134	7	141	8	24	1	
(England) Steve Wright	DF	1978–1982	134	7	141	2	2	2	
(England) Aaron Skelton	MF	1997–2001	128	13	141	17	4	0	
(England) Ryan Jackson	DF	2017–2020	134	6	140	6	12	1	
(England) Liam Chilvers	DF	2003 (Note: On loan from Arsenal); 2003–2004; 2004–2006	132	7	139	3	20	2	
(Scotland) Johnny McKim	FW	1950–1955	138	0	138	48	0	1	
(England) Derek Parker	HB	1957–1961	138	0	138	1	0	0	
(England) Steve Whitton	FW	1994–1998	124	14	138	25	12	1	
(England) Neil Langman	FW	1957–1961	137	0	137	58	0	0	
(England) Clive Platt	FW	2007–2010	117	18	135	27	15	1	
(England) Scott Daniels	DF	1988–1991	124	10	134	1	0	0	
(England) Frank Nouble	FW	2018–2020; 2021 (Note: On loan from Plymouth Argyle); 2021–	122	12	134	17	19	2	
(Republic of Ireland) Mark Yeates	FW	2005–2006 (Note: On loan from Tottenham Hotspur); 2007–2009	126	7	133	27	17	0	
(England) Mick Loughton	DF	1964–1968	131	1	132	7	0	0	
(Wales) Keith Bowen	FW	1983; 1983–1985	130	2	132	48	3	0	
(England) Freddie Sears	FW	2012 (Note: On loan from West Ham United); 2012–2015; 2021–	100	32	132	44	3	0	
(England) Keith Day	DF	1984–1987	130	0	130	12	9	0	
(England) Vic Keeble	FW	1947–1952	130	0	130	84	0	0	
(England) John Church	FW	1950–1954	129	0	129	22	0	0	
(England) Bob Dale	HB	1954–1957	129	0	129	12	0	0	
(England) Ian Henderson	FW	2010–2013	101	28	129	26	17	1	
(England) Augie Scott	FW	1951–1954	128	0	128	11	0	0	
(England) Bobby Svarc	FW	1972–1975	128	0	128	64	0	0	
(Republic of Ireland) Scott Fitzgerald	DF	2000–2004	126	2	128	0	7	0	
(Republic of Ireland) Eamonn Collins	MF	1989–1992	123	5	128	9	1	1	
(England) Andy Farrell	MF	1983–1987	121	7	128	5	4	0	
(England) Andy Bond	MF	2010–2014	90	38	128	13	4	0	
(Nigeria) Kayode Odejayi	FW	2009 (Note: On loan from Barnsley); 2010–2012	79	49	128	19	8	0	
(Scotland) Stewart Houston	DF	1983–1986	125	2	127	8	0	0	
(England) Johnny Williams	FB	1975–1978	125	1	126	1	2	0	
(England) Kane Vincent-Young	DF	2015–2019	105	21	126	4	11	0	
(England) Ben Williams	GK	2009–2012	125	0	125	0	3	0	
(Scotland) Dennis Mochan	FB	1966–1969	122	3	125	2	0	0	
(Saint Kitts and Nevis) Bobby Bowry	MF	2001–2004	97	27	124	2	13	0	
(England) Johnnie Jackson	MF	2003; 2006–2009	107	16	123	13	10	0	
(England) Phil Thomas	MF	1972–1975	116	6	122	8	0	0	
(England) Paul Roberts	DF	1991–1994	121	0	121	2	0	0	
(England) Reg Stratton	FW	1965–1968	121	0	121	56	0	0	
(England) Paul Buckle	MF	1996–1999	112	9	121	10	12	0	
(England) Alex Gilbey	MF	2012–2016	101	20	121	8	24	1	
(England) Bob Allen	FW	1947–1951	120	0	120	7	0	0	
(England) Scott Barrett	GK	1990 (Note: On loan from Stoke City); 1990–1992	120	0	120	1	0	0	
(England) Luke Prosser	DF	2016–2020	116	3	119	6	20	0	
(England) Phil Coleman	FB	1981–1984; 1988–1989	109	10	119	7	0	0	
(England) Tony Lock	FW	1995–1999; 1999–2000	48	71	119	13	7	2	
(England) Ray Harford	DF	1973 (Note: On loan from Port Vale); 1973–1975	117	1	118	5	3	0	
(England) Bobby Blackwood	MF	1965–1968	116	1	117	8	0	0	
(England) Len Cater	FW	1946–1949	116	0	116	34	0	0	
(England) Bobby Cram	FB	1970–1972	115	1	116	4	0	0	
(England) Graham Smith	GK	1969–1971	115	0	115	0	2	0	
(England) Trevor Lee	FW	1978–1981	114	1	115	39	0	0	
(England) Warren Donald	MF	1990–1992	102	12	114	1	1	0	
(Scotland) Kevin Bremner	FW	1980–1982	105	8	113	36	0	0	
(England) Jack Hodge	FW	1937–1939	112	0	112	40	0	0	
(England) Matt Heath	DF	2008 (Note: On loan from Leeds United); 2008–2013	99	13	112	5	11	0	
(England) Bobby Hodge	FW	1978–1981	106	5	111	16	0	0	
(Northern Ireland) Aidan Davison	GK	2004–2007	109	0	109	0	1	1	
(England) Trevor Harris	HB	1955–1963	109	0	109	6	0	0	
(England) Eddie Rowles	MF	1977–1982	96	13	109	20	0	0	
(England) Adam Locke	MF	1993 (Note: On loan from Southend United); 1994–1997	87	21	108	8	2	2	
(England) Steven Gillespie	FW	2008–2012	50	58	108	28	14	1	
(England) Benny Fenton	HB	1955–1958	107	0	107	15	1	0	
(England) Bert Hill	HB	1953–1958	107	0	107	3	0	0	
(Republic of Ireland) Tony McCarthy	DF	1995–1997	105	1	106	1	4	2	
(England) Roger Joslyn	MF	1967–1970	98	8	106	4	0	0	
(England) Colin Garwood	FW	1976–1978	101	4	105	39	1	0	
(Scotland) Chris Iwelumo	FW	2005–2007	97	6	103	37	4	0	
(England) George Leslie	DF	1937–1939	102	0	102	1	0	0	
(England) Peter Bullock	FW	1965–1968	100	2	102	33	0	0	
(England) Jason Dozzell	MF	1998–2000	94	8	102	10	12	0	
(Scotland) Billy Stark	FW	1962–1965	101	0	101	35	0	0	
(England) Cyril Hammond	HB	1958–1961	100	0	100	5	0	0	
