= Percy Ames =

English footballer (1931–1998)

Personal information
- Full name: Percy Talbot Ames
- Date of birth: 13 December 1931
- Place of birth: Bedford, England
- Date of death: 4 December 1998 (aged 66)
- Height: 5 ft 9 in (1.75 m)
- Position: Goalkeeper

Senior career*
Years	Team	Apps	(Gls)
- Bedford Avenue
1951–1955	Tottenham Hotspur	0	(0)
1955–1965	Colchester United	397	(0)
1965–1966	Romford	10	(0)
- Bedford Town
Total		397	(0)
- * Club domestic league appearances and goals

Percy Talbot Ames (13 December 1931 – 4 December 1998) was an English footballer who played as a goalkeeper in the Football League for Colchester United, where he made 422 appearances in all competitions between 1955 and 1965. He was also on the books at Tottenham Hotspur but did not make a first-team appearance.

== Career ==
Born in Bedford, Ames began his career at Tottenham Hotspur in 1951 having arrived from now-defunct club Bedford Avenue. He failed to make a first-team appearance for Spurs between 1951 and 1955, and on the advice of the Tottenham first-team and England goalkeeper Ted Ditchburn, Colchester United manager Benny Fenton signed Ames up in 1955 following a short trial.

Ames made his first-team and Football League debut on 20 August 1955 in a 0–0 away draw with Exeter City, where Ames announced his arrival by saving a penalty kick. Over the period of ten years, Ames would make 397 Football League appearances for Colchester and made 422 appearances in all competitions. During one stint, he missed only three league games over a span of seven years, two of which were missed due to a fractured finger. His run included a spell of 224 consecutive games played for the club, starring in FA Cup runs and achieving promotion to the Third Division in the 1961–62 season. Ames was then made inaugural Colchester United Player of the Year at the end of the 1964–65 season, his final season with the club. At one point during his career, West Bromwich Albion came in with an offer for Ames, but keen to keep his custodian, manager Fenton decided not to tell him until two years later.

Ames' final appearance for the club to which he had dedicated ten years came on 26 February 1965, unfortunately for Ames, a 5–0 defeat at the hands of Queens Park Rangers. On leaving the U's, he turned out for non-league Romford before returning to Bedford to play for his hometown club Bedford Town.

Percy Ames died at the age of 66 on 4 December 1998. He was posthumously inducted into the Colchester United 'Hall of Fame' in 2010.

== Career statistics ==
Appearances and goals by club, season and competition
Club	Season	League			FA Cup		League Cup		Total	
Club	Season	Division	Apps	Goals	Apps	Goals	Apps	Goals	Apps	Goals
Colchester United	1955–56	Third Division South	44	0	1	0	–		45	0
Colchester United	1956–57	Third Division South	46	0	1	0	–		47	0
Colchester United	1957–58	Third Division South	46	0	1	0	–		47	0
Colchester United	1958–59	Third Division	46	0	6	0	–		52	0
Colchester United	1959–60	Third Division	46	0	1	0	–		47	0
Colchester United	1960–61	Third Division	45	0	2	0	2	0	49	0
Colchester United	1961–62	Fourth Division	44	0	3	0	1	0	48	0
Colchester United	1962–63	Third Division	34	0	1	0	2	0	37	0
Colchester United	1963–64	Third Division	20	0	0	0	0	0	20	0
Colchester United	1964–65	Third Division	26	0	2	0	2	0	30	0
Career total			397	0	18	0	7	0	422	0

== Honours ==
=== Club ===
Colchester United

- 1961–62 Football League Fourth Division runner-up (level 4)

=== Individual ===
- 1965 Colchester United Player of the Year

All honours referenced by:
