= Jackie Fisher (footballer, born 1925) =

English footballer (1925–2022)

Personal information
- Full name: John Alfred Fisher
- Date of birth: 19 June 1925
- Place of birth: Bermondsey, London, England
- Date of death: 17 January 2022 (aged 96)
- Position: Left-back

Senior career*
| Years | Team | Apps | (Gls) |
| 1947–1949 | Millwall | 3 | (0) |
| 1949–1953 | Bournemouth | 52 | (0) |
- Ramsgate
- Yeovil Town
| Total | | 55 | (0) |
- * Club domestic league appearances and goals

John Alfred Fisher (19 June 1925 – 17 January 2022) was an English footballer who played as a left-back in the Football League.

He was the twin brother of former Millwall fullback George Fisher. Fisher died on 17 January 2022, at the age of 96.
