= Eddie Smith (footballer) =

English footballer

Personal information
- Full name: Edmund William Alfred Smith
- Date of birth: 23 March 1929
- Place of birth: Marylebone, London, England
- Date of death: April 1993 (aged 64)
- Height: 5 ft 9 in (1.75 m)
- Position: Forward

Senior career*
Years	Team	Apps	(Gls)
- Wealdstone
1950–1952	Chelsea	0	(0)
1952–1953	Bournemouth	0	(0)
1953–1954	Watford	38	(12)
1954–1956	Northampton Town	53	(12)
1956–1957	Colchester United	35	(13)
1957–1958	Queens Park Rangers	17	(1)
- Chelmsford City
- Wisbech Town
Total		143	(38)
- * Club domestic league appearances and goals

Edmund William Alfred "Eddie" Smith (23 March 1929 – April 1993) was an English footballer who played as a forward in the Football League for Watford, Northampton Town, Colchester United and Queens Park Rangers. He was also on the books at Chelsea and Bournemouth but failed to make an appearance for either team.

== Career ==
Born in Marylebone, London, Smith joined Chelsea from non-league Wealdstone in May 1950. He spent two seasons at Stamford Bridge but couldn't break into the first team. He then moved to Bournemouth where he spent a further season with no first-team appearances. In the 1953–54 season, Smith accumulated 12 goals in 38 games for Watford, where he moved following his frustrating season with Bournemouth.

After a dispute with a director at Watford F.C., Smith joined Northampton Town F.C. for a reported fee of £5,000. He scored 12 goals in 53 league appearances before later leaving the club following further disagreements with management. Colchester United manager Benny Fenton signed Smith in June 1956 and scored 13 times in 35 appearances in a season where Colchester ran rivals Ipswich Town close for the Third Division South title.

Smith's Colchester debut came in the Essex derby on the opening day of the 1956–57 season where the U's won 3–2 at Layer Road. He opened his account four days later at Crystal Palace with a hat-trick, and scored a further treble against Reading on 19 January 1957. While playing for Colchester, Smith lived in London and requested a transfer in June 1957 to reduce the amount of travelling required. The U's sold Smith to Queens Park Rangers for more than they initially paid for him, ending his spell with the club with a record of 13 goals in 35 league matches.

QPR did not get a great return on their investment in Smith as he could score only one goal in 17 games during a stint blighted by injury, including a several-month stay on the sidelines with a knee injury. After a single season with the R's, Smith again moved on, this time to Chelmsford City and then Wisbech Town.

After retiring from football, Smith established an electrical business in the Willesden area. He died in April 1993.
