= John Roe (footballer) =

Scottish footballer

Personal information
- Full name: John Roe
- Date of birth: 7 January 1938
- Place of birth: Broxburn, Scotland
- Date of death: 20 February 1996 (aged 58)
- Place of death: Wandsworth, London, England
- Position: Full-back

Senior career*
Years	Team	Apps	(Gls)
1959	Berwick Rangers	1	(0)
1959	Colchester United	2	(0)
1960–1963	Dundee United	8	(0)
1963–1964	St Johnstone	11	(0)
Total		22	(0)
- * Club domestic league appearances and goals

John Roe (7 January 1938 – 20 February 1996) was a Scottish footballer whose career as a full-back extended from 1959 (Berwick Rangers) to 1964 (St Johnstone).

A native of Broxburn, John Roe began his career as a trialist for Berwick Rangers, playing once in the 1957–58 season before moving south to Colchester United. The full-back played just twice for them before returning to Scotland, joining Dundee United in 1960. Despite staying at Tannadice for three seasons, Roe played in only eight league matches and made the short journey to Perth to join St Johnstone. Here, Roe played eleven league games during the 1963–64 season before retiring from football to join the police force.

Roe died in 1996.
