= Bert Hill =

English footballer

Personal information
- Full name: Albert Hill
- Date of birth: 8 March 1930
- Place of birth: West Ham, London England
- Date of death: 14 July 2017 (aged 87)
- Height: 5 ft 8 in (1.73 m)
- Position: Wing-half

Youth career
- –1950: Chelsea

Senior career*
Years	Team	Apps	(Gls)
1950–1952	Chelsea	0	(0)
1952–1958	Colchester United	104	(3)
1958–1959	Dartford		
- Hastings United
- Canterbury City
Total		104+	(3+)
- * Club domestic league appearances and goals

Albert Hill (8 March 1930 – 14 July 2017) was an English professional footballer who played as a wing-half for Colchester United in the Football League.

== Career ==
Born in West Ham, London, Hill began his career at Chelsea, where he signed a professional contract in May 1950. He failed to break into the first-team, and joined Third Division South club Colchester United on trial in August 1952. He signed permanently for a £300 fee by the end of September 1952. He made his debut on 11 April 1953 in Colchester's 3–1 win against Bristol City. That was to be his only appearance of the season, and over the next four seasons played a role as a squad-player, unable to hold down a regular starting position.

Hill handed in a transfer request at the end of the 1956–57 season in order to find a club closer to his London home. However, his final campaign with the club proved to be his most rewarding making 32 first-team appearances. After making 107 appearances and scoring three goals, he left Colchester in July 1958 to join Dartford. He signed for Hastings United in June 1959, and later played for Canterbury City before knee injuries caused him to end his playing career.

== After football ==
After quitting football, Hill had jobs driving for Schweppes, working for a paper bag manufacturer and later became a London taxicab driver. He died at the age of 87 on 14 July 2017.

== Career statistics ==
Appearances and goals by club, season and competition
Club	Season	League			FA Cup		Total	
Club	Season	Division	Apps	Goals	Apps	Goals	Apps	Goals
Colchester United	1952–53	Third Division South	1	0	0	0	1	0
Colchester United	1953–54	Third Division South	16	1	0	0	16	1
Colchester United	1954–55	Third Division South	19	0	2	0	21	0
Colchester United	1955–56	Third Division South	22	1	0	0	22	1
Colchester United	1956–57	Third Division South	15	1	0	0	15	1
Colchester United	1957–58	Third Division South	31	0	1	0	32	0
Career total			104	3	3	0	107	3
