= Hamish McNeill =

Scottish footballer (1934–2017)

Hamish McNeil
Personal information
- Full name: Hamish Grant McNeil
- Date of birth: 16 November 1934
- Place of birth: Alva, Scotland
- Date of death: 15 October 2017 (aged 82)
- Position: Wing half

Senior career*
Years	Team	Apps	(Gls)
- Bonnyrigg Rose Athletic
1957–1958	Colchester United	2	(1)
- Cambridge City
Total		2	(1)
- * Club domestic league appearances and goals

Hamish Grant McNeil (16 November 1934 – 15 October 2017) was a Scottish footballer who played in the Football League as a wing half for Colchester United.

== Career ==
Born in Alva, McNeill began his career with Scottish junior club Bonnyrigg Rose Athletic before joining English Football League side Colchester United in 1957. He made his debut for the club on 21 September 1957 and scored Colchester's goal in a 1–1 draw with Bournemouth. He played only once more for Colchester, in the following game at home to Northampton Town, a 4–1 defeat. After leaving the club, McNeill joined non-league team Cambridge City.

== Death ==
McNeill died on 15 October 2017, at the age of 82.
