= Roy Summersby =

English footballer

Personal information
- Full name: Roy Donald Summersby
- Date of birth: 19 March 1935
- Place of birth: Lambeth, Greater London
- Date of death: 7 August 2016 (aged 81)
- Place of death: Bury St Edmunds, England
- Position: Inside forward

Youth career
- ?–1952: Millwall

Senior career*
Years	Team	Apps	(Gls)
1951–1958	Millwall	87	(13)
1958–1963	Crystal Palace	176	(59)
1963–1965	Portsmouth	12	(1)
1965–?	Chelmsford City	?	(?)
?	Hillingdon Borough	?	(?)
- * Club domestic league appearances and goals

Roy Donald Summersby (19 March 1935 – 7 August 2016) was an English professional footballer who played as an inside forward. He appeared 275 times in the English Football League for Millwall, Crystal Palace, and Portsmouth, before moving into non-league football with Chelmsford City and Hillingdon Borough.

== Playing career ==
Summersby began his playing career at Millwall, initially as a junior before signing as a professional in March 1952, but did not fully establish himself in the first team until 1957. In December 1958, he signed for Crystal Palace then playing in the Fourth Division in its inaugural season. He quickly became a first team regular and put together a sequence of 126 consecutive appearances, many of them alongside Johnny Byrne. In October 1959, Summersby scored four goals in Crystal Palace's biggest-ever league win; a 9–0 home victory over Barrow.

In the 1960–61 season, Palace achieved promotion to the third tier and Summersby was ever present, making 46 appearances, scoring 25 goals, which is still (as of September 2014) the fourth highest seasonal goals total in Crystal Palace Post-War history. Only Byrne the same season (30), Andrew Johnson in 2003–04 (28) and Glenn Murray in 2012–13 (30) have scored more goals. The next season, Summersby made 42 appearances, scoring eight times, but in 1962–63 only appeared 17 times (in the first half of the season) and scored twice. At the end of that season, in May 1963, he transferred to Portsmouth, rejoining former Palace manager George Smith. However, after only 12 games for Portsmouth, over two seasons, Summersby moved on to non–league football with Chelmsford City and later Hillingdon Borough.

Summersby died on 7 August 2016, in Bury St Edmunds, aged 81.
