= John Fowler (footballer, born 1933) =

Scottish footballer

Personal information
- Date of birth: 17 October 1933
- Place of birth: Leith, Edinburgh, Scotland
- Date of death: 28 March 1976 (aged 42)
- Position: Fullback

Senior career*
Years	Team	Apps	(Gls)
?–1955	Bonnyrigg Rose Athletic	?	(?)
1955–1966	Colchester United	442	(5)
- Heybridge Swifts
- * Club domestic league appearances and goals

John Fowler (17 October 1933 – 28 March 1976) was a Scottish professional footballer, who played for Colchester United.

== Career ==
Fowler was born in Leith. In his early days he played for junior side Bonnyrigg Rose Athletic, during which time he was capped for Scotland against England at Middlesbrough.

Fowler was one of three players brought down from Scotland to Colchester United, along with Sammy McLeod and Bobby Hill from Easthouses Lily, by manager Benny Fenton in 1955. Astute purchases, all three gave lengthy service to the club. Fowler made his debut along with Hill on 20 August 1955 in a goalless draw away to Exeter City. Initially an inside left, he switched to left back later that season.

In thirteen seasons at Layer Road Fowler made 442 appearances, including one as substitute, 21 FA Cup matches and 7 League Cup matches and scored five goals. Fowler still holds eight place in Colchester's all-time list of long serving players and fifth on the League appearances list and made the number 3 shirt his own for the majority of his career, being an integral part of the promotion sides of 1962 and 1966.

Between 1956 and 1963 Fowler missed only eight matches, becoming known as "Mr Reliable". He was an ever-present during the 1957–58, 1959–60, 1961–62 and 1962–63 seasons and only missed one game during 1960–61.

Although he left the club at the end of the 1965–66 season, Fowler returned briefly for three games during 1967–68, his final appearance occurring on 13 November 1967 at home to Barrow.

=== Retirement and death ===
After leaving Colchester United, Fowler became player-manager at Heybridge Swifts. He then moved on to Eastern Gas and finally onto Severalls Athletic where he helped to win the East Essex League Knockout Cup against Stanway. He was also a regular member of Peter Wright's Ex-Colchester United XI. Fowler almost became manager of Hibernian Football club, but due to family commitments stayed down south in England. Leyton Orient also approached John to become their manager again at the final hour opting to stay in Colchester.

Playing against Layer Fox, Fowler collapsed and died, aged 42, leaving behind his wife Shirley, Son Scott and a daughter Karen.

== John Fowler Memorial Cup ==
This is played for each season by teams in the Colchester & District Sunday League. Fowler's son, Scott, won the cup in the 1994–95 season. The cup has since been renamed The Fowler Memorial cup in memory of John and Scott, who also died at the very young age of 42; Scott was a winner of the trophy, having had a long playing career in the Colchester and Suffolk leagues, and was held in high regard throughout the leagues. John's grandson Stuart Fowler reached the semifinals before losing to Corecalona 1–0.

== Honours ==
=== Club ===
Colchester United

- Football League Fourth Division Runner-up (1): 1961–62
