= Peter Kearns =

English footballer

Personal information
- Full name: Peter Vincent Kearns
- Date of birth: 26 March 1937
- Place of birth: Aldershot, Hampshire, England
- Date of death: 6 July 2014 (aged 77)
- Place of death: Weymouth, Dorset, England
- Position: Inside forward

Senior career*
Years	Team	Apps	(Gls)
195?–1956	Wellingborough Town	?	(?)
1956–1959	Plymouth Argyle	65	(8)
196?–1962	Corby Town	?	(?)
1962–1968	Aldershot	185	(65)
1968–1969	Lincoln City	46	(11)
1969–1971	Weymouth	?	(?)
- * Club domestic league appearances and goals

Peter Vincent Kearns (26 March 1937 – 6 July 2014) was an English footballer who scored 83 goals from 296 appearances in the Football League playing for Plymouth Argyle, Aldershot and Lincoln City. He played as an inside forward. He also played non-league football for Wellingborough Town and Corby Town, and finished his career with two seasons in the Southern League with Weymouth, where he was a director in the 1990s.

Kearns had been receiving treatment for dementia in the early 2010s and in support of his cause, his granddaughter, Hollie Kearns (aged 19 at the time) participated in a sky dive on Saturday 2 November 2013 to raise funds to find a cure. Overall she raised £700. Kearns died in a Weymouth, Dorset, care home on 6 July 2014 at the age of 77.
