= John Page (footballer, born 1934) =

English footballer

Personal information
- Date of birth: 21 October 1934
- Place of birth: Frimley Green, England
- Date of death: 2 July 2006 (aged 71)
- Place of death: Winchester, England
- Positions: Centre-half; right-back

Youth career
- Mytchett Boys
- Surrey Schools
- 1951–1952: Southampton

Senior career*
Years	Team	Apps	(Gls)
1952–1961	Southampton	190	(23)
1962–1963	Hastings United		

Managerial career
- 1967–1970: Camberley Town
- * Club domestic league appearances and goals

John Page (21 October 1934 – 2 July 2006) was an English footballer. Born in Frimley Green, Surrey, Page played the majority of his professional career with Football League club Southampton, before later moving to Hastings United for his final season. He also managed Camberley Town between 1967 and 1970. Originally an outside-left, Page played primarily as a centre-half and occasionally as a right-back.

== Playing career ==
John Page played youth football for Mytchett Boys, before he was signed in October 1951 by Southampton coach Jimmy Eason on the recommendation of Mytchett manager "Busty" Wells. At the age of 18, Page made his debut against Sheffield United on 8 November 1952, playing at outside-left alongside Ted Bates, although he quickly converted to a centre-half.

In the 1959–60 season, Page played at centre-half in all but one game in the Third Division, establishing himself as the side's first-choice penalty taker ahead of free-kick specialist Terry Paine and top scorer George O'Brien; he converted a total of 21 penalties in his career, a club record until it was topped by Mick Channon, David Peach, Matthew Le Tissier, and Rickie Lambert. As the Saints gained promotion to the Second Division, Page kept his place in the starting lineup and played the first 40 games of the campaign, before the arrival and establishment of Tony Knapp prompted him to leave the club.

Despite interest from fellow Football League side Torquay United, Page made the step down to the Southern League to join Hastings United in June 1962. He only spent one season at United, and due to a problem with his weight played mostly for the reserve side, retiring from professional playing at the end of the campaign.

== Managerial career ==
After retiring from playing and holding a "variety of jobs" in his local area, Page was brought in as the manager for Camberley Town in June 1967. Despite the club establishing a "more stable financial base", Page was unable to bring the club success and resigned from his post in June 1970.

== Career statistics ==
Appearances and goals by club, season and competition
Club	Season	League			FA Cup		League Cup		Other		Total	
Club	Season	Division	Apps	Goals	Apps	Goals	Apps	Goals	Apps	Goals	Apps	Goals
Southampton	1952–53	Second Division	2	0	0	0	—		—		2	0
Southampton	1953–54	Third Division South	0	0	0	0	—		—		0	0
Southampton	1954–55	Third Division South	0	0	0	0	—		—		0	0
Southampton	1955–56	Third Division South	22	1	0	0	—		—		22	1
Southampton	1956–57	Third Division South	7	0	0	0	—		—		7	0
Southampton	1957–58	Third Division South	38	4	2	0	—		1	0	41	4
Southampton	1958–59	Third Division	36	6	2	0	—		2	0	40	6
Southampton	1959–60	Third Division	45	8	6	1	—		4	0	55	9
Southampton	1960–61	Second Division	40	4	2	0	7	1	—		49	5
Career total			190	23	12	1	7	1	7	0	216	25
