= Les Barrell =

English footballer (1932–2010s)

Personal information
- Full name: Leslie Peter Barrell
- Date of birth: 30 August 1932
- Place of birth: Colchester, England
- Date of death: 2010s
- Place of death: Tikipunga, New Zealand
- Position: Winger

Senior career*
Years	Team	Apps	(Gls)
- Lexden Wanderers
- Harwich & Parkeston
1956	Colchester United	4	(1)
- Clacton Town
Total		4	(1)
- * Club domestic league appearances and goals

Leslie Peter Barrell (30 August 1932 – 2010s) was an English footballer who played as a winger in the Football League for Colchester United.

== Career ==
Leslie Peter Barrell was born in Colchester on 30 August 1932. He joined hometown club Colchester United on a professional basis in 1956, having played amateur football for Lexden Wanderers. He played briefly for Colchester's 'A' team in 1952–53, but switched between Layer Road and Harwich & Parkeston a number of times before finally becoming squad member. He scored on his debut for the U's in the Essex derby against Southend United, his only goal for the club, in a 3–2 home victory on 18 August 1956. He signed part-time professional terms in December 1956, but by this time, Barrell had already made three of his four appearances for Colchester. His final game came on 29 December 1956 in a 1–1 draw with Queens Park Rangers, bringing his total to one goal in four league appearances for Colchester.

== Later life and death ==
On leaving Colchester, Barrell returned to non-league football with Clacton Town and then emigrated to New Zealand in 1963 where he played local football for Kamo Whangarei. He settled in Tikipunga, where he died in the early 2010s.
