= Bob Dale (footballer) =

English footballer

Personal information
- Full name: Robert Jenkins Dale
- Date of birth: 31 October 1931
- Place of birth: Irlam, England
- Date of death: 17 January 2007 (aged 75)
- Position: Wing half

Senior career*
Years	Team	Apps	(Gls)
?–1952	Altrincham	?	(?)
1952–1954	Bury	15	(2)
1954–1957	Colchester United	127	(12)
- * Club domestic league appearances and goals as of 01:42, 12 May 2011

Robert Jenkins Dale (31 October 1931 – 2007), born in Irlam, Lancashire, was a professional footballer who played as a wing half. He played for Altrincham in non-league football, and played league football for Bury, making 15 appearances and scoring two goals, and Colchester United , making 128 appearances before he retired after contracting tuberculosis.

Dale died after suffering from cancer in January 2007.
