= John Laidlaw (footballer) =

English footballer

Personal information
- Full name: John Laidlaw
- Date of birth: 5 July 1936 (age 90)
- Place of birth: Aldershot, England
- Position: Full-back

Senior career*
Years	Team	Apps	(Gls)
- Easthouses Lily
1959–1960	Colchester United	41	(1)
- Clacton Town
Total		41	(1)
- * Club domestic league appearances and goals

John Laidlaw (born 5 July 1936) is an English former footballer who played in the Football League as a full-back for Colchester United.

== Career ==
Laidlaw, born in Aldershot, began his playing career in Scotland with Easthouses Lily before being signed by Colchester United in the Football League in September 1959. He made his debut for the club on 5 September in a 4–2 Third Division defeat to Southampton. Laidlaw scored once in 41 league appearances for the U's, scoring in the reverse fixture with Southampton at Layer Road, a game which resulted in a 1–1 draw. He played his final game for Colchester on 22 August 1960 when he suffered a knee cartilage injury during a 1–1 home draw with Grimsby Town. Laidlaw never played professionally again. After his release from Colchester, he played for Clacton Town.
