= John Harrison (footballer, born 1927) =

English footballer

Personal information
- Full name: John Walter Harrison
- Date of birth: 27 September 1927
- Place of birth: Leicester, England
- Date of death: 11 December 2015 (aged 88)
- Place of death: Colchester, England
- Position: Fullback

Senior career*
Years	Team	Apps	(Gls)
1948–1950	Aston Villa	0	(0)
1950–1956	Colchester United	237	(1)
- * Club domestic league appearances and goals as of 01:39, 13 May 2011

John Walter Harrison (27 September 1927 – 11 December 2015), was an English professional footballer.

== Career ==
Harrison played as a full back in The Football League for Colchester United and for Aston Villa, although he made no appearances there. Harrison retired from the game in 1956 through injury.

== Death ==
Harrison died on 11 December 2015 in Colchester and left behind his wife, 3 children and 6 grandchildren, including grandson Callum Harrison who plays for Colchester United F.C. and Needham Market F.C.
