= Brian Dobson (footballer) =

English footballer (1934–2025)

Personal information
- Full name: Brian Ashley Dobson
- Date of birth: 1 March 1934
- Place of birth: Colchester, England
- Date of death: 15 August 2025 (aged 91)
- Position: Defender

Youth career
- Colchester United

Senior career*
Years	Team	Apps	(Gls)
–1956	Colchester Casuals		
1956–1959	Colchester United	24	(0)
- Clacton Town
Total		24	(0)
- * Club domestic league appearances and goals

Brian Ashley Dobson (1 March 1934 – 15 August 2025) was an English footballer who played as a defender in the Football League for Colchester United.

== Career ==
After joining hometown club Colchester United as an apprentice, Dobson made his first-team debut for the club in a 1–0 away defeat to Aldershot on 24 March 1956. He made 24 appearances in the Football League for the U's between 1956 and 1959, with his final game coming on 7 November 1959, a 2–1 victory at Layer Road against Newport County. He later moved to Clacton Town.

== Death ==
Dobson died after a short illness at home, on 15 August 2025, at the age of 91.
