= Tommy Mulgrew =

Scottish footballer (1929-2016)

Personal information
- Full name: Thomas Mulgrew
- Date of birth: 13 April 1929
- Place of birth: Motherwell, Scotland
- Date of death: 12 January 2016 (aged 86)
- Place of death: Northampton, England
- Position: Forward

Youth career
- Cleland Juniors

Senior career*
Years	Team	Apps	(Gls)
1948–1949	Greenock Morton		
1949–1952	Northampton Town	8	(1)
1952–1954	Newcastle United	14	(1)
1954–1962	Southampton	293	(90)
1962–1965	Aldershot	112	(2)
1965–????	Andover		
- * Club domestic league appearances and goals

Thomas Mulgrew (13 April 1929 – 12 January 2016) was a Scottish professional footballer who played most of his career as an inside forward, for Southampton.

== Playing career ==
Born in Motherwell, he started his football career with Morton in March 1948, before moving to England firstly with Northampton (from July 1949). In October 1952 he joined Newcastle where he made fourteen First Division appearances but found it difficult to claim a regular place, having to compete with Reg Davies and Ivor Broadis.

In July 1954, Southampton's manager George Roughton paid £12,000 to bring Mulgrew and Billy Foulkes to The Dell of which £7,000 was attributed to Mulgrew. He scored 15 seconds into his debut on 21 August 1954 at home to Brentford (won by Saints 6–4); this was the fastest-ever goal scored at The Dell.

Mulgrew went on to score eight league goals that season, as Saints narrowly missed out on promotion to the Second Division. Although Mulgrew showed promise, this was largely unfulfilled and he did not score consistently. According to Holley & Chalk he was "a real glutton for fetching and carrying." "There was no doubt that Tommy was not only a crowd favourite but popular with his colleagues as well".

He became the first player to be sent off for Southampton for 21 years in a match at home to Coventry over Christmas 1954.

His career at Southampton spanned eight seasons during which he scored 90 league goals in 293 appearances placing him 10th on the club's list of all-time league goal-scorers. He also played 37 cup and friendly games, scoring 10 goals to bring his total goals scored for the Saints to a round century.

In August 1962, after a dispute over terms, he moved to Aldershot, where he played 112 league games, before he joined Andover in August 1965. He had a brief spell in non-league football before moving to Northampton, where he worked in a steel factory in Rothwell until his retirement. He lived in Northampton with his wife until his death in January 2016.
