= Reg Stewart (footballer, born 1925) =

English footballer

Personal information
- Full name: Reginald Stewart
- Date of birth: 30 October 1925
- Place of birth: Sheffield, England
- Date of death: 6 March 2011 (aged 85)
- Position: Centre half

Senior career*
Years	Team	Apps	(Gls)
1946–1949	Sheffield Wednesday	6	(0)
1949–1957	Colchester United	268	(2)
1957–?	Hastings United	?	(?)
	Clacton Town	?	(?)
- * Club domestic league appearances and goals

Reginald "Reg" Stewart (30 October 1925 – 6 March 2011) was an English footballer who played as a centre half in The Football League.

== Career ==
Born in Sheffield, Stewart played for Sheffield Wednesday and Colchester United in the Football League from 1946 until 1957, and with non-league clubs Hastings United and Clacton Town.

A member of the first ever Colchester United side to play in a Football League game, Reg was an uncompromising central defender who came south from Sheffield Wednesday.

A regular in the heart of the defence for seven years, he played some 268 times for the U's before leaving to sign for Clacton Town.

== Honours ==
=== Club ===
Colchester United

- Southern League runner-up: 1949–50
- Southern League Cup winner: 1949–50
