= Neil Langman =

English footballer (1932–2021)

Personal information
- Full name: Neil Hedley Langman
- Date of birth: 21 February 1932
- Place of birth: Tavistock, England
- Date of death: September 2021 (aged 89)
- Place of death: Devon, England
- Position: Centre forward

Youth career
- Tavistock

Senior career*
Years	Team	Apps	(Gls)
1953–1957	Plymouth Argyle	96	(49)
1957–1961	Colchester United	128	(49)
1961–1963	Bath City	59	(38)
1963–1964	Barnstaple Town		
1964–1966	Falmouth Town	54	(48)
1966–1967	St Austell		
Total		224	(98)
- * Club domestic league appearances and goals

Neil Hedley Langman (21 February 1932 – September 2021) was an English footballer who played as a centre forward.

Langman started his career with local amateur club Tavistock before signing for Football League club Plymouth Argyle in 1954.

He scored 50 goals in 99 appearances for the club before he joined Colchester United in 1957 for £6,750. He was released in 1961 and then joined Bath City. In 1964 he joined Falmouth Town and played 63 in matches, scoring 67 goals.

Langman died in Devon in September 2021, at the age of 89.
