= Derek Parker (footballer) =

English footballer

Personal information
- Date of birth: 23 June 1926
- Place of birth: Wivenhoe, Essex, England
- Date of death: 8 April 2011 (aged 84)
- Place of death: Colchester, Essex, England
- Position: Half back

Senior career*
Years	Team	Apps	(Gls)
–1944	Grays Athletic		
1944–1957	West Ham United	199	(9)
1957–1961	Colchester United	130	(1)
1961–1969	Stowmarket Town		

Managerial career
- 1960–1969: Stowmarket Town
- 1969–?: Coggeshall Town
- * Club domestic league appearances and goals as of 12:45, 12 April 2011 (UTC) ‡ National team caps and goals as of 19:00, 20 March 2010 (UTC)

Derek Parker (Note: According to West Ham United, his birth name was Derrick Parker, whereas Barry Hugman's Footballers give a full name of Derek Sevastapool Parker.) (23 June 1926 – 8 April 2011) was an English footballer who played in the Football League for West Ham United and Colchester United. He played as an inside-forward, but later switched to half-back.

Parker joined West Ham United from Grays Athletic in October 1944. He made a total of 199 League appearances for the east London club between 1946 and 1957. He also made eight FA Cup appearances, and over 200 Football Combination appearances with the reserve team.

In 1951, Parker was part of the FA XI squad that travelled to Australia.

He was signed by Colchester United, then managed by Benny Fenton (brother of Hammers manager Ted) on 15 March 1957. He went on to make 130 League appearances for the club, and became club captain, leaving in March 1961.

Parker thereafter joined Stowmarket Town as player-manager and switched to full-back. The appointment coincided with the club's return to amateur status. He remained at the club until 1969, when he left for Coggeshall Town. He led that club to a Border League and Cup double in 1969–70, and the Essex Intermediate Cup in 1970–71 (beating Great Wakering Rovers in the Final).

Parker died in April 2011.
