= Russell Blake (footballer) =

English footballer (1935–2024)

Personal information
- Full name: Russell Timothy Blake
- Date of birth: 24 July 1935
- Place of birth: Colchester, England
- Date of death: 5 August 2024 (aged 89)
- Position: Winger

Senior career*
| Years | Team | Apps | (Gls) |
| 1955–1961 | Colchester United | 58 | (8) |
- Sudbury Town
- * Club domestic league appearances and goals

Russell Timothy Blake (24 July 1935 – 5 August 2024) was an English professional footballer who played as a winger for Colchester United.

== Biography ==
Born in Colchester in Essex, Blake signed for Colchester in 1955. He made his debut against Leyton Orient on 8 September 1955, and went on to make 58 appearances for the club, scoring eight goals. He left the club in 1961 and signed for non-League Sudbury Town.

Blake was married with three children. He died on 5 August 2024.
