= Trevor Harris (footballer) =

English footballer

Personal information
- Full name: Trevor John Harris
- Date of birth: 6 February 1936 (age 90)
- Place of birth: Colchester, England
- Position: Wing half

Youth career
- Colchester United

Senior career*
Years	Team	Apps	(Gls)
1954–1963	Colchester United	99	(6)
1963–?	Chelmsford City	?	(?)
- * Club domestic league appearances and goals as of 01:22, 13 May 2011

Trevor John Harris (born 6 February 1936) is an English former professional footballer who played as a wing half in The Football League.

== Career ==
Born in Colchester, England, Harris made 99 appearances for hometown club Colchester United, helping the team to the promotion to the Third Division in the 1961–62 season. He left the U's in 1963 to play non-league football for Chelmsford City.

== Honours ==
=== Club ===
Colchester United

- Football League Fourth Division Runner-up (1): 1961–62
