= Kevin McCurley (footballer) =

English footballer

Personal information
- Full name: Kevin McCurley
- Date of birth: 2 April 1926
- Place of birth: Consett, England
- Date of death: May 2000 (aged 74)
- Place of death: Margate, England
- Position: Forward

Senior career*
Years	Team	Apps	(Gls)
- Worthing
1948–1951	Brighton & Hove Albion	21	(9)
1951–1952	Liverpool	0	(0)
1952–1960	Colchester United	224	(92)
1960–1961	Oldham Athletic	1	(0)
- Tonbridge
- * Club domestic league appearances and goals

Kevin McCurley (2 April 1926 – May 2000) was an English professional footballer who played as a forward.

== Career ==
Born in Consett, McCurley began his career with non-league Worthing. He moved to Brighton & Hove Albion and scored 9 goals in 21 league appearances, before being recruited by Liverpool. He made no league appearances for Liverpool and was sold to Colchester United for £750. He made 224 league appearances in eight years with the U's, scoring 92 goals. He was released in 1960 and made one appearance for Oldham Athletic. He then returned to non-league football. Kevin McCurley died in May 2000.
