= George Fisher (footballer) =

English footballer

Personal information
- Full name: George Sidney Fisher
- Date of birth: 19 June 1925
- Place of birth: Bermondsey, London, England
- Date of death: 30 August 2015 (aged 90)
- Place of death: Essex, England
- Position: Right-back

Senior career*
Years	Team	Apps	(Gls)
1942–1954	Millwall	286	(4)
1954–1955	Fulham	8	(0)
1955–1960	Colchester United	164	(6)
- Bexleyheath & Welling
1961–1962	Romford	14	(0)
- Aveley
Total		458	(10)
- * Club domestic league appearances and goals

George Sidney Fisher (19 June 1925 – 30 August 2015) was an English footballer who played as a right-back in the Football League.

He signed his contract for Millwall F.C. in 1942 and played in the War Cup South Final at Wembley against Chelsea on 7 April 1945; the attendance at the game reached 90,000, which is the largest crowd Millwall have ever played in front of. He is the twin brother of former Millwall defender Jackie Fisher.

After leaving Colchester, he played for non-League clubs Bexleyheath & Welling, Romford and Aveley.
