= Chic Milligan =

Scottish footballer (1930–2020)

Personal information
- Full name: Charles Campbell Milligan
- Date of birth: 26 July 1930
- Place of birth: Ardrossan, Scotland
- Date of death: February 2020 (aged 89)
- Position: Defender

Senior career*
| Years | Team | Apps | (Gls) |
| 1956–1961 | Colchester United | 185 | (3) |
- * Club domestic league appearances and goals as of 20:40, 28 March 2012 (UTC)

Charles Campbell "Chic" Milligan (26 July 1930 – February 2020) was a Scottish professional footballer who played as a defender.
