= Tommy Williams (footballer, born 1935) =

English footballer

Personal information
- Full name: Thomas John Williams
- Date of birth: 10 February 1935
- Place of birth: Battersea, England
- Date of death: 25 August 1967 (aged 32)
- Position: Winger

Senior career*
Years	Team	Apps	(Gls)
?–1956	Carshalton Athletic	?	(?)
1956–1961	Colchester United	150	(31)
1961–1962	Watford	12	(6)
1962–?	Gravesend & Northfleet	?	(?)
- * Club domestic league appearances and goals as of 11:46, 17 May 2011

Thomas John Williams (10 February 1935 – 25 August 1967) born in Battersea, London, was an English professional footballer who played as a winger.

== Career ==
He played in Football League for Colchester and Watford. Williams also played in non-league football for Carshalton Athletic and Gravesend & Northfleet.
