= Bobby Hill (Scottish footballer) =

Scottish footballer (born 1938)

Personal information
- Full name: Robert Hill
- Date of birth: 9 June 1938 (age 88)
- Place of birth: Edinburgh, Scotland
- Position: Inside forward

Senior career*
Years	Team	Apps	(Gls)
?–1955	Easthouses Lily	?	(?)
1955–1965	Colchester United	238	(21)
1965–?	Bury Town	?	(?)
- * Club domestic league appearances and goals as of 01:58, 13 May 2011

Robert Hill (born 9 June 1938) is a Scottish former professional footballer who played as an inside forward in The Football League for Colchester United.

== Career ==
Hill signed for Colchester from Easthouses Lily in 1955 and made over 200 appearances for the club as well as helping them secure promotion to the Third Division in 1961–62, before moving to non-league side Bury Town in 1965.

== Honours ==
=== Club ===
Colchester United

- Football League Fourth Division Runner-up (1): 1961–62
