= Sammy McLeod =

Scottish footballer

Personal information
- Full name: Samuel Mark McLeod
- Date of birth: 4 January 1934
- Place of birth: Glasgow, Scotland
- Date of death: 29 July 1973 (aged 39)
- Place of death: Adelaide, Australia
- Position: Forward

Senior career*
Years	Team	Apps	(Gls)
1955–1962	Colchester United	152	(23)
1962–	Romford		
- * Club domestic league appearances and goals

Samuel Mark McLeod (4 January 1934 – 29 July 1973) was a Scottish professional footballer who played as a forward.
