= Ken Plant =

English footballer

Personal information
- Full name: Kenneth George Plant
- Date of birth: 15 August 1925
- Place of birth: Nuneaton, England
- Date of death: 22 March 2014 (aged 88)
- Position: Centre-forward

Senior career*
Years	Team	Apps	(Gls)
?–1949	Nuneaton Borough	?	(?)
1949–1954	Bury	119	(54)
1954–1959	Colchester United	189	(82)
1959–?	Nuneaton Borough	?	(?)
- Atherstone Town
- * Club domestic league appearances and goals as of 14:50, 16 May 2011

Kenneth George Plant (15 August 1925 – 22 March 2014) was an English professional footballer who played as a centre-forward in The Football League for Bury and Colchester United. Plant also made appearances for hometown club Nuneaton Borough and Atherstone Town in the non-leagues.
