= Peter Wright (footballer, born 1934) =

English footballer

Personal information
- Full name: Peter Brooke Wright
- Date of birth: 26 January 1934
- Place of birth: Colchester, England
- Date of death: 24 October 2012 (aged 78)
- Place of death: Abberton, Essex, England
- Position: Winger

Senior career*
Years	Team	Apps	(Gls)
1951–1964	Colchester United	427	(90)
1964–1965	Romford	4	(0)
- * Club domestic league appearances and goals

Peter Brooke Wright (26 January 1934 – 24 October 2012) was an English footballer who played for Colchester United from 1951 until 1964.

== Career ==
In 2000, Wright was named winner of the Evening Gazette's U's Player of the Century poll, and was voted as one of the inaugural stars for the Hall of Fame.

He died on 24 October 2012.

In February 2015, a life-size statue of Peter Wright was installed at the former Layer Road ground where Colchester United played before moving to the Colchester Community Stadium. A new housing development, Turnstile Square, was built around the centre strip of the pitch which was retained with the centre spot preserved and blessed by a priest as the place where some fans had their cremation ashes scattered. Peter Wright's statue was placed next to the former centre spot in tribute to the many earlier players who had played at Layer Road.
