= Benny Fenton =

English footballer and manager

- Fenton at West Ham United in 1937

Personal information
- Full name: Benjamin Robert Vincent Fenton
- Date of birth: 28 October 1918
- Place of birth: West Ham, England
- Date of death: 29 July 2000 (aged 81)
- Place of death: Poole, England
- Height: 5 ft 8 in (1.73 m)
- Positions: Inside forward; wing half

Youth career
- 1934–1935: Colchester Town
- 1935–1937: West Ham United

Senior career*
Years	Team	Apps	(Gls)
1937–1939	West Ham United	21	(9)
1939–1947	Millwall	20	(7)
1947–1955	Charlton Athletic	264	(22)
1955–1958	Colchester United	104	(15)
Total		409	(53)

Managerial career
- 1955–1963: Colchester United
- 1963–1964: Leyton Orient
- 1966–1974: Millwall
- * Club domestic league appearances and goals

Benjamin Robert Vincent Fenton (28 October 1918 – 29 July 2000) was an English professional football player and manager. He played for West Ham United, Millwall, Charlton Athletic and Colchester United, making over 400 appearances in the Football League for all four clubs. He managed Colchester United, Leyton Orient and spent eight years at Millwall, before holding various positions at Charlton Athletic.

== Career ==
=== Playing career ===
Fenton represented West Ham, Essex and London as a schoolboy. He signed for Colchester Town in 1934, moving to West Ham United a year later. Fenton served in the same Territorial Army unit as his West Ham teammates and played mainly as outside-left with the east London club.

He made his professional debut for West Ham United on 9 October 1937, playing alongside his older brother Ted, as an inside forward in a match against Fulham. He played three times that season, and managed nine goals in his eighteen games in 1938–39. The two brothers played together in the same team on four occasions, the only brothers to do so at first team level for West Ham. Fenton was not retained by the club and joined Millwall in March 1939, where he was utilised as a wing half.

Fenton joined the Essex Regiment during the Second World War. He guested for former club West Ham United in November 1944, and also played for Norwich City, Manchester City, Charlton Athletic, Crystal Palace, York City, and Cardiff City as a wartime guest.

Fenton never gained full international honours, but toured South Africa with the FA in 1939, making three appearances, and also represented an FA Services XI team against Switzerland on 24 July 1945.

Fenton joined Charlton Athletic of the First Division in January 1947. He became club captain in the 1950–51 season, and made 264 League appearances at inside forward and wing half during his nine seasons with the club, before leaving in February 1955.

=== Coaching career ===
In 1955, Fenton joined Third Division South club Colchester United as player-manager and switched to defensive duties. He played his first game for the club on 5 March 1955, a home match against Brentford that the U's won 3–2. He narrowly missed out on success in the 1956–57 campaign, after finishing a single point behind both Ipswich Town and Torquay United. He played on into the 1957–58 season, playing his final game for the club on 1 May 1958, a 4–2 home win against Southampton, aged 39 years, 185 days. Colchester United finished 12th in the 1957–58 Third Division South campaign, thereby earning the right to compete in the newly merged Third Division the following season. After relegation in 1960–61, he led the team to promotion after finishing as Fourth Division runners-up in 1961–62.

Fenton joined Leyton Orient as manager on 1 November 1963. He was sacked after 56 games in charge in December 1964.

He went on to take the manager role at Millwall on 1 May 1966, towards the end of the 1965–66 season. The season saw the south London club win promotion to Division Two (the club's second promotion in succession), and the club would set a record of 59 home League games unbeaten in December 1966. Millwall spent the rest of Fenton's tenure in England's second tier; the closest the Lions came to promotion under Fenton was in 1972, with a point separating them from second-place Birmingham City. He left the club on 3 October 1974, as the club's longest serving post-war manager.

In January 1977, he rejoined Charlton as secretary. He became assistant manager of the Addicks in March 1980 and progressed to the position of general manager in June 1981. He stayed in with the club until June 1982.

== Managerial statistics ==
Managerial record by team and tenure
Team	From	To	Record				
Team	From	To	P	W	D	L	Win %
Colchester United	28 February 1955	16 November 1963	425	165	106	154	38.8
Leyton Orient	16 November 1963	31 December 1964	56	17	14	25	30.4
Millwall	1 May 1966	3 October 1974	391	150	113	128	38.4
Total			872	331	234	307	38.0

== Outside football ==
Fenton also played lawn bowls for Essex County. He married wife Winnie on Christmas Day 1939, with whom he had one daughter, two grandchildren and one great grandchild. In later life, he lived in Dorset, where he died, aged 81.
