= 1962–63 Colchester United F.C. season =

Football club season of 1962-63

Colchester United
1962–63 season
- Chairman: Bill Allen
- Manager: Benny Fenton
- Stadium: Layer Road
- Third Division: 12th
- FA Cup: 1st round (eliminated by Wimbledon)
- League Cup: 2nd round (eliminated by Northampton Town)
- Top goalscorer: League: Martyn King (26); All: Martyn King (28)
- Highest home attendance: 7,244 v Southend United, 4 May 1963
- Lowest home attendance: 3,059 v Bradford Park Avenue, 15 December 1962
- Average home league attendance: 5,313
- Biggest win: 4–1 v Brighton & Hove Albion, 10 November 1962
- Biggest defeat: 0–6 v Notts County, 17 May 1963
Home colours

The 1962–63 season was Colchester United's 21st season in their history and their first season back in the third tier of English football following promotion from the Fourth Division the previous season. Alongside competing in the Third Division, the club also participated in the FA Cup and the League Cup. Colchester consolidated their Third Division return by finishing mid-table. In the cups, they bowed out in the first round of the FA Cup to Isthmian League side Wimbledon, while they overcame Watford in the first round of the League Cup only to crash out to Northampton Town in the second.

== Season overview ==
Despite debts of £2,000, the club were not prepared to sell prize forward Bobby Hunt when Newcastle United came in with an offer of £17,000.

During the season, Colchester made their television debut when they featured in the new Anglia Television programme Match of the Week. Highlights were shown on 13 October 1962 of Colchester's Layer Road defeat to Crystal Palace. Martyn King was back on top of the scoring charts for Colchester, leading the way with 26 league goals, Hunt following up with 19. With the defence shipping 93 goals across the season, a mid-table finish loomed for Colchester on their return to the Third Division after just one year away. However, in the FA Cup, they were ousted by Isthmian League Wimbledon in the first round, while they also experienced a second round exit in the League Cup to Northampton Town.

== Players ==
As of match played 17 May 1963.

Name	Position	Nationality	Place of birth	Date of birth	Apps	Goals	Signed from	Date signed	Fee
Goalkeepers
Percy Ames	GK	(England)	Plymouth	13 December 1931 (aged 30)	335	0	(England) Tottenham Hotspur	1 May 1955	Free transfer
George Ramage	GK	(Scotland)	Dalkeith	29 January 1937 (aged 25)	0	0	(Scotland) Third Lanark	15 March 1963 (Note: Date of signing refers to the date of the player's first game for the club)	Nominal
Defenders
Duncan Forbes	CB	(Scotland)	Edinburgh	19 June 1941 (aged 20)	6	0	(Scotland) Musselburgh Athletic	4 September 1961	Nominal
John Fowler	FB	(Scotland)	Leith	17 October 1933 (aged 28)	298	5	(Scotland) Bonnyrigg Rose Athletic	20 August 1955	Free transfer
Richie Griffiths	FB	(England)	Earls Colne	21 March 1942 (aged 20)	16	0	(England) Colchester Casuals	June 1961	Free transfer
David Laitt	FB	(England)	Colchester	1 November 1946 (aged 15)	0	0	Amateur	Summer 1962	Free transfer
Mick Loughton	CB	(England)	Colchester	8 December 1942 (aged 19)	0	0	Amateur	August 1961	Free transfer
Edgar Rumney	FB	(England)	Abberton	15 September 1936 (aged 25)	25	0	(England) Colchester Casuals	1 May 1957	Free transfer
Keith Rutter	CB	(England)	Leeds	10 September 1934 (aged 27)	0	0	(England) Queens Park Rangers	26 February 1963	£4,000
Midfielders
Ron Hunt	WH	(England)	Colchester	26 September 1933 (aged 28)	142	1	Amateur	October 1951	Free transfer
Roy McCrohan	WH	(England)	Reading	22 September 1930 (aged 31)	0	0	(England) Norwich City	1 September 1962	Part exchange
Forwards
Mike Grice	WG	(England)	Woking	3 November 1931 (aged 30)	109	16	(England) Coventry City	18 August 1962 (Note: Date of signing refers to the date of the player's first game in his second spell for the club)	£1,000
Bobby Hill	IF	(Scotland)	Edinburgh	9 June 1938 (aged 23)	182	18	(Scotland) Easthouses Lily Miners Welfare	9 June 1955	Free transfer
Bobby Hunt	FW	(England)	Colchester	1 October 1942 (aged 19)	77	47	Amateur	March 1960	Free transfer
Martyn King	CF	(England)	Birmingham	23 August 1937 (aged 24)	133	89	Amateur	Summer 1955	Free transfer
Tony Miller	IF	(England)	Chelmsford	26 October 1937 (aged 24)	0	0	Amateur	May 1958	Free transfer
Billy Stark	FW	(Scotland)	Glasgow	27 May 1937 (aged 25)	0	0	(England) Carlisle United	November 1962	£3,750
Peter Wright	WG	(England)	Colchester	26 January 1934 (aged 28)	371	80	Amateur	November 1951	Free transfer

== Transfers ==
=== In ===
Date	Position	Nationality	Name	From	Fee	Ref.
Summer 1962	FB	(England)	David Laitt	Amateur	Free transfer	
18 August 1962	WG	(England)	Mike Grice	(England) Coventry City	£1,000	(Note: Date of signing refers to the date of the player's first game in his second spell for the club)
1 September 1962	WH	(England)	Roy McCrohan	(England) Norwich City	Part exchange with Mike Foster	
November 1962	FW	(Scotland)	Billy Stark	(England) Carlisle United	£3,750	
26 February 1963	CB	(England)	Keith Rutter	(England) Queens Park Rangers	£4,000	(Note: Date of signing refers to the date of the player's first game for the club)
15 March 1963	GK	(Scotland)	George Ramage	(Scotland) Third Lanark	Nominal	

- Total spending: ▼ ~ £8,750

=== Out ===
Date	Position	Nationality	Name	To	Fee	Ref.
End of season	WG	(England)	Colin Lundstrum	(England) Clacton Town	Released	
Summer 1962	FB	(England)	Alf Marshall	(England) Clacton Town	Released	
Summer 1962	WG	(England)	Tony Howe	(England) Haverhill Rovers	Released	
1 September 1962	CF	(England)	John Baines	(England) Lexden Wanderers	Free transfer	(Note: Date of departure refers to the date of the player's final game for the club)
1 September 1962	WG	(England)	Mike Foster	(England) Norwich City	£3,000 plus Roy McCrohan	
20 October 1962	CF	(England)	David Coleman	(England) Clacton Town	Released	
3 November 1962	WH	(Scotland)	John Brown	(Scotland) Stenhousemuir	Released	
December 1962	IF	(Scotland)	Sammy McLeod	(England) Romford	£1,000	
April 1963	WH	(England)	Brian Abrey	Retired	Retired	
16 April 1963	WH	(England)	Trevor Harris	(England) Chelmsford City	Free transfer	

- Total incoming: ▲ ~ £4,000

== Match details ==
=== Third Division ===
==== Results round by round ====
Round	1	2	3	4	5	6	7	8	9	10	11	12	13	14	15	16	17	18	19	20	21	22	23	24	25	26	27	28	29	30	31	32	33	34	35	36	37	38	39	40	41	42	43	44	45	46
Ground	A	H	H	A	A	A	H	H	H	H	A	H	H	A	A	H	H	A	H	H	A	A	H	H	A	A	H	H	A	A	H	A	A	A	H	A	A	H	H	H	A	H	H	H	A	A
Result	D	W	D	W	D	L	D	L	D	D	W	W	L	W	D	W	L	L	D	W	L	L	D	L	L	D	L	D	L	W	W	W	L	W	W	L	D	W	W	W	W	W	L	W	L	L
Position	14	2	6	3	5	7	9	9	13	17	14	8	15	10	9	3	7	11	14	12	13	13	13	14	18	18	19	17	19	17	16	17	17	15	14	16	16	14	12	10	9	8	9	8	9	10

Source: 11v11.com
A = Away; H = Home; W = Win; D = Draw; L = Loss

==== League table ====
Pos	Team	Pld	W	D	L	GF	GA	GAv	Pts
10	Hull City	46	19	10	17	74	69	1.072	48
11	Crystal Palace	46	17	13	16	68	58	1.172	47
12	Colchester United	46	18	11	17	73	93	0.785	47
13	Queens Park Rangers	46	17	11	18	85	76	1.118	45
14	Bristol City	46	16	13	17	100	92	1.087	45

==== Matches ====
18 August 1962 1	Bradford Park Avenue	1–1	Colchester United	Bradford
	Maxwell 3'	Report	King 1'	Stadium: Park Avenue; Attendance: 9,482; Referee: A. Edge

20 August 1962 2	Colchester United	1–0	Bristol City	Colchester
	B. Hunt 44'	Report		Stadium: Layer Road; Attendance: 6,824; Referee: Denis Howell

25 August 1962 3	Colchester United	0–0	Coventry City	Colchester
		Report; Report		Stadium: Layer Road; Attendance: 5,781; Referee: Ray Tinkler

28 August 1962 4	Bristol City	1–2	Colchester United	Bristol
	Etheridge 18' (pen.)	Report	King 17', 85'	Stadium: Ashton Gate Stadium; Attendance: 12,508; Referee: Jack Taylor

1 September 1962 5	Bournemouth & Boscombe Athletic	1–1	Colchester United	Bournemouth
	Spelman 6'	Report	B. Hunt 42'	Stadium: Dean Court; Attendance: 9,208; Referee: C. Woan

3 September 1962 6	Port Vale	4–2	Colchester United	Burslem
	Longbottom 4'; Grainger 15'; Poole 26'; Ford 28'	Report	King 27', 52'	Stadium: Vale Park; Attendance: 11,729

8 September 1962 7	Colchester United	2–2	Notts County	Colchester
	Hampton 17' (o.g.); Hill 88'	Report	Astle 19'; Jones 80'	Stadium: Layer Road; Attendance: 5,524; Referee: J. Cooke

10 September 1962 8	Colchester United	0–1	Port Vale	Colchester
		Report	Wright 39'	Stadium: Layer Road; Attendance: 6,039

15 September 1962 9	Colchester United	2–2	Northampton Town	Colchester
	B. Hunt 34'; Wright 69'	Report	Ashworth 26', 51'	Stadium: Layer Road; Attendance: 5,512; Referee: Norman Burtenshaw

19 September 1962 10	Colchester United	1–4	Reading	Reading
	B. Hunt	Report	Unknown goalscorer	Stadium: Elm Park; Attendance: 5,207

22 September 1962 11	Southend United	2–3	Colchester United	Southend-on-Sea
	Beesley 22'; Smith 59'	Report; Report	B. Hunt 4', 30'; King 5'	Stadium: Roots Hall; Attendance: 11,487; Referee: P. Bye

24 September 1962 12	Colchester United	4–2	Reading	Colchester
	King 25'; B. Hunt 53', 58'; Hill 71'	Report	Wheeler 75'; Allen 83'	Stadium: Layer Road; Attendance: 5,999

29 September 1962 13	Colchester United	2–5	Millwall	Colchester
	Grice 57'; McCrohan 88'	Report	Stocks 14'; Gilchrist 20'; Jones 33'; Towers 64'; Haverty 74'	Stadium: Layer Road; Attendance: 7,096; Referee: C. Woan

3 October 1962 14	Shrewsbury Town	1–2	Colchester United	Shrewsbury
	Rowley 35'	Report	Grice 48'; Hill 87'	Stadium: Gay Meadow; Attendance: 8,261

6 October 1962 15	Hull City	2–2	Colchester United	Kingston upon Hull
	Clarke	Report	King	Stadium: Boothferry Park; Attendance: 9,360

8 October 1962 16	Colchester United	3–2	Shrewsbury Town	Colchester
	B. Hunt 52'; King 57'; Grice 61'	Report	Harley 48'; Pountney 55'	Stadium: Layer Road; Attendance: 6,472

13 October 1962 17	Colchester United	1–2	Crystal Palace	Colchester
	McCrohan 25'	Report	Smillie 45', 52'	Stadium: Layer Road; Attendance: 6,371; Referee: T. Dawes

20 October 1962 18	Wrexham	4–1	Colchester United	Wrexham
	K. Barnes; R. Barnes; Metcalf	Report	Coleman 40'	Stadium: Racecourse Ground; Attendance: 12,750

27 October 1962 19	Colchester United	1–1	Halifax Town	Colchester
	B. Hunt 3' (pen.)	Report	Priestley 39'	Stadium: Layer Road; Attendance: 4,697; Referee: G. Pullin

10 November 1962 20	Colchester United	4–1	Brighton & Hove Albion	Colchester
	King 5', 44', 62'; Hill 66'	Report	Hannam 10'	Stadium: Layer Road; Attendance: 3,853; Referee: W. Handley

17 November 1962 21	Carlisle United	3–1	Colchester United	Carlisle
	Thompson 48'; Brayton 82'; Taylor 88'	Report	King 23'	Stadium: Brunton Park; Attendance: 3,518; Referee: L. Tirebuck

1 December 1962 22	Peterborough United	6–2	Colchester United	Peterborough
	Horobin 1', 27'; Sheavills 25', 82'; Forbes 41' (o.g.); McNamee 79'	Report; Report	Wright 35'; King 77'	Stadium: London Road Stadium; Attendance: 11,290; Referee: G. McCabe

8 December 1962 23	Colchester United	1–1	Barnsley	Colchester
	King 86'	Report	Hopper 66'	Stadium: Layer Road; Attendance: 3,071; Referee: P. Bye

15 December 1962 24	Colchester United	1–4	Bradford Park Avenue	Colchester
	B. Hunt 41'	Report	Walker 30'; Hector 59'; Hannigan 79'; Bird 87'	Stadium: Layer Road; Attendance: 3,059; Referee: A. Sturgeon

22 December 1962	Coventry City	A–A	Colchester United	Coventry
	Farmer 25' (pen.); Hale	Report		Stadium: Highfield Road; Attendance: 11,803; Referee: J. Bollough
Note: Match abandoned at half–time with the score at 2–0 to Coventry City due to fog.

16 February 1963 25	Millwall	2–1	Colchester United	New Cross
	Jones 28', 85'	Report	R. Hunt 50'	Stadium: The Den; Attendance: 9,783; Referee: J. Parkinson

26 February 1963 26	Coventry City	2–2	Colchester United	Coventry
	Bly 2'; Humphries 49'	Report	B. Hunt 64', 79'	Stadium: Highfield Road; Attendance: 13,062

4 March 1963 27	Colchester United	2–3	Hull City	Colchester
	King; Wright	Report	McSeveney; Henderson	Stadium: Layer Road; Attendance: 4,365

8 March 1963 28	Colchester United	1–1	Wrexham	Colchester
	King	Report	Unknown goalscorer	Stadium: Layer Road; Attendance: 4,725

12 March 1963 29	Northampton Town	3–1	Colchester United	Northampton
	Large 4', 43', 78'	Report	King 15'	Stadium: County Ground; Attendance: 9,981

15 March 1963 30	Halifax Town	1–2	Colchester United	Halifax
	Tait	Report	B. Hunt (pen.); R. Hunt	Stadium: The Shay; Attendance: 5,053

22 March 1963 31	Colchester United	1–0	Bristol Rovers	Colchester
	King 41'	Report		Stadium: Layer Road; Attendance: 4,560; Referee: Ray Tinkler

27 March 1963 32	Crystal Palace	0–1	Colchester United	Selhurst
		Report	Wright 71'	Stadium: Selhurst Park; Attendance: 11,672

30 March 1963 33	Brighton & Hove Albion	3–0	Colchester United	Hove
	Baxter 3'; Collins 8'; Cooper 75'	Report		Stadium: Goldstone Ground; Attendance: 6,153; Referee: Norman Burtenshaw

1 April 1963 34	Queens Park Rangers	1–2	Colchester United	Shepherd's Bush
	Malcolm	Report	Wright 50'; Grice	Stadium: Loftus Road; Attendance: 7,688

9 April 1963 35	Colchester United	2–1	Carlisle United	Colchester
	King 55'; Grice 65'	Report	Livingstone 21'	Stadium: Layer Road; Attendance: 4,282; Referee: A. Moore

13 April 1963 36	Swindon Town	6–1	Colchester United	Swindon
	Summerbee 8'; Stevens 44', 46', 50'; Hunt 66', 85'	Report; Report	King 15'	Stadium: County Ground; Attendance: 12,159; Referee: P. Brandwood

15 April 1963 37	Watford	1–1	Colchester United	Watford
	Harris 11'	Report	King 15'	Stadium: Vicarage Road; Attendance: 6,749

16 April 1963 38	Colchester United	3–2	Watford	Colchester
	Wright 31'; Nicholas 53' (o.g.); King 65'	Report	Gregory 30'; Harris 76'	Stadium: Layer Road; Attendance: 5,315

20 April 1963 39	Colchester United	2–0	Peterborough United	Colchester
	Grice 36'; B. Hunt 82'	Report; Report		Stadium: Layer Road; Attendance: 5,143; Referee: G. McCabe

22 April 1963 40	Colchester United	2–1	Queens Park Rangers	Colchester
	Grice 9'; B. Hunt 25'	Report	McClelland	Stadium: Layer Road; Attendance: 6,556

27 April 1963 41	Barnsley	2–3	Colchester United	Barnsley
	Houghton 57'; Rutter 86' (o.g.)	Report	Grice 14'; B. Hunt 31'; Stark 82'	Stadium: Oakwell; Attendance: 5,283; Referee: J. Parr

4 May 1963 42	Colchester United	3–1	Southend United	Colchester
	B. Hunt 50'; Stark 54', 85'	Report; Report	Jones 43'	Stadium: Layer Road; Attendance: 7,244; Referee: Arthur Holland

6 May 1963 43	Colchester United	0–2	Swindon Town	Colchester
		Report; Report	Smart 26', 50'	Stadium: Layer Road; Attendance: 6,952; Referee: M. Fussey

11 May 1963 44	Colchester United	3–1	Bournemouth & Boscombe Athletic	Colchester
	King 65', 78'; B. Hunt	Report	Singer 27'	Stadium: Layer Road; Attendance: 4,414; Referee: N. Matthews

14 May 1963 45	Bristol Rovers	2–0	Colchester United	Bristol
	Biggs (pen.); Bradford	Report		Stadium: Eastville Stadium; Attendance: 9,004

17 May 1963 46	Notts County	6–0	Colchester United	Nottingham
	Unknown goalscorer	Report		Stadium: Meadow Lane; Attendance: 4,103

=== League Cup ===
6 September 1962 1st round	Watford	1–2	Colchester United	Watford
	Fraser 83'	Report	B. Hunt; King	Stadium: Vicarage Road; Attendance: 4,726

26 September 1962 2nd round	Northampton Town	2–0	Colchester United	Northampton
	Unknown goalscorer	Report		Stadium: County Ground; Attendance: 7,771

=== FA Cup ===
3 November 1962 1st round	Wimbledon	2–1	Colchester United	Wimbledon
	Brown 22'; Reynolds 76'	Report	King 80'	Stadium: Plough Lane; Attendance: 8,500; Referee: Ray Tinkler

== Squad statistics ==
=== Appearances and goals ===
No.	Pos	Nat	Player	Total		Third Division		FA Cup		League Cup	
No.	Pos	Nat	Player	Apps	Goals	Apps	Goals	Apps	Goals	Apps	Goals
	GK	(England) ENG	Percy Ames	37	0	34	0	1	0	2	0
	GK	(Scotland) SCO	George Ramage	12	0	12	0	0	0	0	0
	DF	(Scotland) SCO	Duncan Forbes	48	0	46	0	1	0	1	0
	DF	(Scotland) SCO	John Fowler	49	0	46	0	1	0	2	0
	DF	(England) ENG	Richie Griffiths	26	0	23	0	1	0	2	0
	DF	(England) ENG	Edgar Rumney	11	0	10	0	0	0	1	0
	DF	(England) ENG	Keith Rutter	21	0	21	0	0	0	0	0
	MF	(England) ENG	Ron Hunt	34	2	33	2	0	0	1	0
	MF	(England) ENG	Roy McCrohan	33	2	32	2	1	0	0	0
	FW	(England) ENG	Mike Grice	47	8	45	8	1	0	1	0
	FW	(Scotland) SCO	Bobby Hill	31	4	28	4	1	0	2	0
	FW	(England) ENG	Bobby Hunt	47	20	45	19	1	0	1	1
	FW	(England) ENG	Martyn King	44	28	42	26	1	1	1	1
	FW	(Scotland) SCO	Billy Stark	21	3	21	3	0	0	0	0
	FW	(England) ENG	Peter Wright	41	6	38	6	1	0	2	0
Players who appeared for Colchester who left during the season
	MF	(England) ENG	Brian Abrey	1	0	0	0	0	0	1	0
	MF	(Scotland) SCO	John Brown	3	0	1	0	1	0	1	0
	MF	(England) ENG	Trevor Harris	20	0	18	0	0	0	2	0
	FW	(England) ENG	John Baines	1	0	1	0	0	0	0	0
	FW	(England) ENG	David Coleman	2	1	1	1	0	0	1	0
	FW	(Scotland) SCO	Sammy McLeod	10	0	9	0	0	0	1	0

=== Goalscorers ===
Place	Nationality	Position	Name	Third Division	FA Cup	League Cup	Total
1	(England)	CF	Martyn King	26	1	1	28
2	(England)	FW	Bobby Hunt	19	0	1	20
3	(England)	WG	Mike Grice	8	0	0	8
4	(England)	WG	Peter Wright	6	0	0	6
5	(Scotland)	IF	Bobby Hill	4	0	0	4
6	(Scotland)	FW	Billy Stark	3	0	0	3
7	(England)	WH	Ron Hunt	2	0	0	2
7	(England)	WH	Roy McCrohan	2	0	0	2
9	(England)	CF	David Coleman	1	0	0	1
			Own goals	2	0	0	2
			TOTALS	73	1	2	76

=== Clean sheets ===
Number of games goalkeepers kept a clean sheet.

Place	Nationality	Player	Third Division	FA Cup	League Cup	Total
1	(England)	Percy Ames	3	0	0	3
2	(Scotland)	George Ramage	2	0	0	2
		TOTALS	5	0	0	5

=== Player debuts ===
Players making their first-team Colchester United debut in a fully competitive match.

Position	Nationality	Player	Date	Opponent	Ground	Notes
WG	(England)	Mike Grice	18 August 1962	Bradford Park Avenue	Park Avenue	(Note: Second debut for the club.)
WH	(England)	Roy McCrohan	15 September 1962	Northampton Town	Layer Road	
WH	(Scotland)	John Brown	26 September 1962	Northampton Town	County Ground	
FW	(Scotland)	Billy Stark	1 December 1962	Peterborough United	London Road Stadium	
CB	(England)	Keith Rutter	26 February 1963	Coventry City	Highfield Road	
GK	(Scotland)	George Ramage	15 March 1963	Halifax Town	The Shay	

== See also ==
- List of Colchester United F.C. seasons
