= 1963–64 Colchester United F.C. season =

Colchester United
1963–64 season
- Chairman: Bill Allen
- Manager: Benny Fenton (until September); Neil Franklin (from December)
- Stadium: Layer Road
- Third Division: 17th
- FA Cup: 3rd round (eliminated by Workington)
- League Cup: 2nd round (eliminated by Queens Park Rangers)
- Top goalscorer: League: Bobby Hunt (20); All: Bobby Hunt (23)
- Highest home attendance: 7,772 v Fulham, 25 September 1963
- Lowest home attendance: 3,263 v Port Vale, 4 April 1964
- Average home league attendance: 5,242
- Biggest win: 4–0 v Notts County, 30 November 1963; 4–0 v Crewe Alexandra, 22 February 1964
- Biggest defeat: 0–4 v Peterborough United, 21 October 1963
Home colours

The 1963–64 season was Colchester United's 22nd season in their history and their second successive season in the Third Division, the third tier of English football. Alongside competing in the Third Division, the club also participated in the FA Cup and the League Cup.

A mid-season managerial change saw Benny Fenton leave for Leyton Orient and ex-England international Neil Franklin arrive from APOEL. They finished the season in 17th-place and had a good run in the League Cup, seeing off First Division Fulham in the first round, and then Second Division Northampton Town in the second round, before being knocked out in the third round by Fourth Division side Workington. Colchester made the second round of the FA Cup but were beaten by Queens Park Rangers.

== Season overview ==
The 1963–64 season proved to be one of change for Colchester United. Benny Fenton left the club to take over at Second Division Leyton Orient in September. Incoming was former England international Neil Franklin, who had been managing APOEL in Cyprus. Franklin's first piece of business was the sale of prolific forward Bobby Hunt to Northampton Town for £18,000. Hunt's 23 goals scored by the end of February was not surpassed despite his exit as Colchester finished the season in a disappointing 17th–position.

Colchester had an impressive run in the League Cup, seeing off Fulham of the First Division 5–3 in the first round, before beating Northampton in the second round but falling to defeat against Workington in the third. They beat Brighton & Hove Albion in the first round of the FA Cup, but were defeated in the second by Queens Park Rangers.

== Players ==
As of match played 25 April 1964.

Name	Position	Nationality	Place of birth	Date of birth	Apps	Goals	Signed from	Date signed	Fee
Goalkeepers
Percy Ames	GK	(England)	Plymouth	13 December 1931 (aged 31)	372	0	(England) Tottenham Hotspur	1 May 1955	Free transfer
Alan Buck	GK	(England)	Colchester	25 August 1946 (aged 16)	0	0	Amateur	July 1963	Free transfer
George Ramage	GK	(Scotland)	Dalkeith	29 January 1937 (aged 26)	12	0	(Scotland) Third Lanark	15 March 1963 (Note: Date of signing refers to the date of the player's first game for the club)	Nominal
Defenders
Duncan Forbes	CB	(Scotland)	Edinburgh	19 June 1941 (aged 21)	54	0	(Scotland) Musselburgh Athletic	4 September 1961	Nominal
John Fowler	FB	(Scotland)	Leith	17 October 1933 (aged 29)	347	5	(Scotland) Bonnyrigg Rose Athletic	20 August 1955	Free transfer
Richie Griffiths	FB	(England)	Earls Colne	21 March 1942 (aged 21)	42	0	(England) Colchester Casuals	June 1961	Free transfer
David Laitt	FB	(England)	Colchester	1 November 1946 (aged 16)	0	0	Amateur	Summer 1962	Free transfer
Mick Loughton	CB	(England)	Colchester	8 December 1942 (aged 20)	0	0	Amateur	August 1961	Free transfer
Edgar Rumney	FB	(England)	Abberton	15 September 1936 (aged 26)	36	0	(England) Colchester Casuals	1 May 1957	Free transfer
Keith Rutter	CB	(England)	Leeds	10 September 1934 (aged 28)	21	0	(England) Queens Park Rangers	26 February 1963	£4,000
Midfielders
John Docherty	WH	(Scotland)	Glasgow	28 February 1935 (aged 28)	0	0	(Scotland) Heart of Midlothian	14 September 1963	Free transfer
Roy McCrohan	WH	(England)	Reading	22 September 1930 (aged 32)	33	2	(England) Norwich City	1 September 1962	Part exchange
Derek Trevis	MF	(England)	Birmingham	9 September 1942 (aged 20)	0	0	(England) Aston Villa	7 March 1964	Free transfer
Forwards
Mike Grice	WG	(England)	Woking	3 November 1931 (aged 31)	156	24	(England) Coventry City	18 August 1962 (Note: Date of signing refers to the date of the player's first game in his second spell for the club)	£1,000
Bobby Hill	IF	(Scotland)	Edinburgh	9 June 1938 (aged 24)	213	22	(Scotland) Easthouses Lily Miners Welfare	9 June 1955	Free transfer
Martyn King	CF	(England)	Birmingham	23 August 1937 (aged 25)	177	117	Amateur	Summer 1955	Free transfer
Tommy McColl	IF	(Australia)	(Scotland) Glasgow	19 September 1945 (aged 17)	0	0	(Scotland) Dennistoun Waverley	24 August 1963	Free transfer
Tony Miller	IF	(England)	Chelmsford	26 October 1937 (aged 25)	0	0	Amateur	May 1958	Free transfer
Billy Stark	FW	(Scotland)	Glasgow	27 May 1937 (aged 26)	21	3	(England) Carlisle United	November 1962	£3,750
Peter Wright	WG	(England)	Colchester	26 January 1934 (aged 29)	412	86	Amateur	November 1951	Free transfer

== Transfers ==
=== In ===
Date	Position	Nationality	Name	From	Fee	Ref.
July 1963	GK	(England)	Alan Buck	Amateur	Free transfer	
August 1963	FB	(England)	Pat Woods	(Australia) South Coast United	Free transfer	
24 August 1963	IF	(Australia)	Tommy McColl	(Scotland) Dennistoun Waverley	Free transfer	(Note: Date of signing refers to the date of the player's first game for the club)
14 September 1963	WH	(Scotland)	John Docherty	(Scotland) Heart of Midlothian	Free transfer	
7 March 1964	MF	(England)	Derek Trevis	(England) Aston Villa	Free transfer	

=== Out ===
Date	Position	Nationality	Name	To	Fee	Ref.
7 October 1963	WH	(England)	Ron Hunt	Retired	Retired	(Note: Date of departure refers to the date of the player's final game for the club)
March 1964	FW	(England)	Bobby Hunt	(England) Northampton Town	£18,000	
28 March 1964	FB	(England)	Pat Woods	(Australia) South Coast United	Free transfer	

- Total incoming: ▲ ~ £18,000

== Match details ==
=== Friendlies ===
10 August 1963	Southend United	4–1	Colchester United	Southend-on-Sea
15:00 BST	Jones 26'; Beesley 59', 78'; Bradbury 63' (pen.)	Report	Loughton 35'	Stadium: Roots Hall

17 August 1963	Colchester United	1–3	Southend United	Colchester
15:15 BST	McCrohan 70' (pen.)	Report	Smith 4'; Jones 21'; Gilfillan 46'	Stadium: Layer Road; Attendance: 885

=== Third Division ===
==== Results round by round ====
Round	1	2	3	4	5	6	7	8	9	10	11	12	13	14	15	16	17	18	19	20	21	22	23	24	25	26	27	28	29	30	31	32	33	34	35	36	37	38	39	40	41	42	43	44	45	46
Ground	H	A	A	H	H	A	A	H	A	H	H	A	H	H	H	A	A	H	H	A	A	H	A	H	H	A	A	H	A	A	H	A	A	H	A	H	A	A	A	H	H	A	H	H	H	A
Result	W	D	D	L	D	L	W	W	L	W	L	D	D	D	W	L	D	W	L	D	W	W	D	D	W	L	D	W	L	D	L	D	W	D	D	D	L	L	L	D	L	L	D	D	W	L
Position	3	2	4	12	10	15	9	7	11	8	11	11	12	11	12	13	14	10	15	14	11	10	10	10	8	10	10	8	10	9	11	10	9	9	9	9	11	13	13	13	14	16	16	16	15	16

Source: 11v11.com
A = Away; H = Home; W = Win; D = Draw; L = Loss

==== League table ====
Pos	Team	Pld	W	D	L	GF	GA	GAv	Pts
15	Queens Park Rangers	46	18	9	19	76	78	0.974	45
16	Brentford	46	15	14	17	87	80	1.088	44
17	Colchester United	46	12	19	15	70	68	1.029	43
18	Luton Town	46	16	10	20	64	80	0.800	42
19	Walsall	46	13	14	19	59	76	0.776	40

==== Matches ====
24 August 1963 1	Colchester United	4–1	Barnsley	Colchester
	B. Hunt 27' (pen.), 49', 54'; Wright 72'	Report	O'Hara 66'	Stadium: Layer Road; Attendance: 3,507; Referee: Ray Tinkler

27 August 1963 2	Walsall	1–1	Colchester United	Walsall
	Fell 1'	Report	McColl 33'	Stadium: Fellows Park; Attendance: 9,489

31 August 1963 3	Hull City	0–0	Colchester United	Kingston upon Hull
		Report		Stadium: Boothferry Park; Attendance: 11,844; Referee: J. Burlough

7 September 1963 4	Colchester United	1–2	Bournemouth & Boscombe Athletic	Colchester
	Wright 48'	Report	Reeves 3'; Singer 67'	Stadium: Layer Road; Attendance: 4,348; Referee: K. Stokes

9 September 1963 5	Colchester United	0–0	Walsall	Colchester
		Report		Stadium: Layer Road; Attendance: 5,419

14 September 1963 6	Wrexham	5–4	Colchester United	Wrexham
	Fox pen.' Griffiths; Metcalf; Phythian; Whitehouse	Report	Stark; King; Wright	Stadium: Racecourse Ground; Attendance: 6,410

16 September 1963 7	Millwall	0–1	Colchester United	New Cross
		Report	B. Hunt 64'	Stadium: The Den; Attendance: 9,321; Referee: Eric Jennings

21 September 1963 8	Colchester United	2–0	Queens Park Rangers	Colchester
	B. Hunt 43' (pen.); Stark 88'	Report		Stadium: Layer Road; Attendance: 5,418

28 September 1963 9	Bristol Rovers	3–1	Colchester United	Bristol
	Jones 20'; Biggs 27'; Jarman 81'	Report	Stark 29'	Stadium: Eastville Stadium; Attendance: 10,724

30 September 1963 10	Colchester United	2–0	Millwall	Colchester
	B. Hunt 21'; Wright 89'	Report		Stadium: Layer Road; Attendance: 5,482

5 October 1963 11	Colchester United	2–3	Oldham Athletic	Colchester
	King 70', 87'	Report	Bowie 64'; Lister 68', 69'	Stadium: Layer Road; Attendance: 5,190

7 October 1963 12	Southend United	0–0	Colchester United	Southend-on-Sea
		Report; Report		Stadium: Roots Hall; Attendance: 8,875

12 October 1963 13	Colchester United	1–1	Crewe Alexandra	Colchester
	King 65'	Report	Lord 38'	Stadium: Layer Road; Attendance: 5,232; Referee: J. Parr

14 October 1963 14	Colchester United	3–3	Southend United	Colchester
	Stark 8', 85'; King	Report; Report	Ashworth 7'; Smith 75'	Stadium: Layer Road; Attendance: 6,610

19 October 1963 15	Colchester United	2–1	Coventry City	Colchester
	B. Hunt 12'; Grice 32'	Report	Humphries 86'	Stadium: Layer Road; Attendance: 7,189

21 October 1963 16	Peterborough United	4–0	Colchester United	Peterborough
	Smith; Dougan	Report; Report^{[usurped]}		Stadium: London Road Stadium; Attendance: 11,505

26 October 1963 17	Mansfield Town	1–1	Colchester United	Mansfield
	Wagstaff 56'	Report	King 24'	Stadium: Field Mill; Attendance: 10,278; Referee: H. Richards

28 October 1963 18	Colchester United	4–1	Peterborough United	Colchester
	King 16'; B. Hunt 19'; Stark 70'; Wright 76'	Report; Report^{[usurped]}	Smith 89'	Stadium: Layer Road; Attendance: 6,966

2 November 1963 19	Colchester United	1–2	Brentford	Colchester
	King 82'	Report	Block 44'; Dick 62'	Stadium: Layer Road; Attendance: 7,117

9 November 1963 20	Shrewsbury Town	1–1	Colchester United	Shrewsbury
	Rowley 65'	Report	Stark 1'	Stadium: Gay Meadow; Attendance: 6,427

23 November 1963 21	Port Vale	0–2	Colchester United	Burslem
		Report	B. Hunt 3', 50'	Stadium: Vale Park; Attendance: 11,158; Referee: A. Jones

30 November 1963 22	Colchester United	4–0	Notts County	Colchester
	B. Hunt 15'; Stark 85'; King	Report		Stadium: Layer Road; Attendance: 4,377

14 December 1963 23	Barnsley	1–1	Colchester United	Barnsley
	O'Hara 61'	Report	Stark 23'	Stadium: Oakwell; Attendance: 4,984; Referee: J. Cattlin

21 December 1963 24	Colchester United	1–1	Hull City	Colchester
	B. Hunt 64' (pen.)	Report	Wilkinson 25'	Stadium: Layer Road; Attendance: 3,609; Referee: J. Loynton

26 December 1963 25	Colchester United	2–1	Reading	Colchester
	B. Hunt 56'; King 75'	Report	Neate 49'	Stadium: Layer Road; Attendance: 5,607; Referee: G. Roper

28 December 1963 26	Reading	5–3	Colchester United	Reading
	Kerr 14'; Jones 16', 85'; Fowler 52' (o.g.); Rutter 80' (o.g.)	Report	B. Hunt 22'; Stark 28'; Wright 60'	Stadium: Elm Park; Attendance: 7,878; Referee: Norman Burtenshaw

11 January 1964 27	Bournemouth & Boscombe Athletic	2–2	Colchester United	Bournemouth
	Crickmore 60'; Coughlan 80'	Report	Wright 76'; King 82'	Stadium: Dean Court; Attendance: 8,090; Referee: D. Smith

18 January 1964 28	Colchester United	4–1	Wrexham	Colchester
	Stark 4', 24'; B. Hunt 45', 80' (pen.)	Report	Colbridge 43'	Stadium: Layer Road; Attendance: 4,460; Referee: Ray Tinkler

25 January 1964 29	Luton Town	3–1	Colchester United	Luton
	Walden 7'; O'Rourke 79'; Turner 83' (pen.)	Report	B. Hunt 26'	Stadium: Kenilworth Road; Attendance: 4,725; Referee: W. Handley

1 February 1964 30	Queens Park Rangers	0–0	Colchester United	Shepherd's Bush
		Report		Stadium: Loftus Road; Attendance: 5,225

8 February 1964 31	Colchester United	2–3	Bristol Rovers	Colchester
	King	Report	Brown; Hamilton; Jarman	Stadium: Layer Road; Attendance: 4,747

15 February 1964 32	Oldham Athletic	2–2	Colchester United	Oldham
	Ledger 32'; Whitaker 80'; Frizzell (red card) 54'	Report	B. Hunt 20' (pen.), 90'; King (red card) 54'	Stadium: Boundary Park; Attendance: 11,525; Referee: K. Stokes

22 February 1964 33	Crewe Alexandra	0–4	Colchester United	Crewe
		Report	McCrohan 7'; King 18'; B. Hunt 54'; Stark 70'	Stadium: Gresty Road; Attendance: 3,866; Referee: B. Setchell

24 February 1964 34	Colchester United	1–1	Bristol City	Colchester
	Docherty 61'	Report	Atyeo 52'	Stadium: Layer Road; Attendance: 4,803

29 February 1964 35	Crystal Palace	0–0	Colchester United	Selhurst
		Report		Stadium: Selhurst Park; Attendance: 15,421; Referee: H. New

7 March 1964 36	Colchester United	1–1	Mansfield Town	Colchester
	Grice 53'	Report	Hollett 30'	Stadium: Layer Road; Attendance: 3,666; Referee: V. Batty

14 March 1964 37	Brentford	3–1	Colchester United	Brentford
	Ward; Lazarus	Report	Thomson o.g.'	Stadium: Griffin Park; Attendance: 7,050; Referee: Arthur Holland

21 March 1964	Colchester United	A–A	Crystal Palace	Colchester
	King 30'	Report	Stephenson 28'	Stadium: Layer Road; Attendance: 5,333; Referee: D. Corbett
Note: Match abandoned after 57–minutes with the score at 1–1 due to a waterlogged pitch.

27 March 1964 38	Watford	3–1	Colchester United	Watford
	Crisp 26'; Harris pen.' Oliver	Report	Grice	Stadium: Vicarage Road; Attendance: 18,393

28 March 1964 39	Bristol City	3–1	Colchester United	Bristol
	Clark 45'; Clark 64'; Atyeo	Report	Stark 87'	Stadium: Ashton Gate Stadium; Attendance: 7,780; Referee: W. Gow

31 March 1964 40	Colchester United	1–1	Watford	Colchester
	McCrohan pen.'	Report	Livesey	Stadium: Layer Road; Attendance: 6,477

4 April 1964 41	Colchester United	1–2	Port Vale	Colchester
	Stark 66'	Report	Miles 4'; Rowland 77'	Stadium: Layer Road; Attendance: 3,263; Referee: T. Dawes

11 April 1964 42	Notts County	3–1	Colchester United	Nottingham
	Flower 44'; Woolley 74'	Report	McCrohan 61' (pen.)	Stadium: Meadow Lane; Attendance: 3,912

15 April 1964 43	Colchester United	1–1	Crystal Palace	Colchester
	Grice 37'	Report	Imlach 10' (pen.)	Stadium: Layer Road; Attendance: 5,633

18 April 1964 44	Colchester United	1–1	Luton Town	Colchester
	King 74'	Report	O'Rourke 66'	Stadium: Layer Road; Attendance: 3,913

20 April 1964 45	Colchester United	1–0	Shrewsbury Town	Colchester
	King	Report		Stadium: Layer Road; Attendance: 3,647

25 April 1964 46	Coventry City	1–0	Colchester United	Coventry
	Hudson 22'	Report		Stadium: Highfield Road; Attendance: 36,901

=== League Cup ===
25 September 1963 1st round	Colchester United	5–3	Fulham	Colchester
	Stark 21', 48'; King 67'; B. Hunt pen.' Grice	Report	Metchick 82', 88'; Key	Stadium: Layer Road; Attendance: 7,772

4 November 1963 2nd round	Colchester United	4–1	Northampton Town	Colchester
	King 23'; Wright	Report	Robson 49'	Stadium: Layer Road; Attendance: 6,237; Referee: T. Dawes

26 November 1963 3rd round	Workington	2–1	Colchester United	Workington
	Unknown goalscorer	Report	B. Hunt	Stadium: Borough Park; Attendance: 8,237

=== FA Cup ===
16 November 1963 1st round	Brighton & Hove Albion	0–1	Colchester United	Hove
		Report	B. Hunt 54'	Stadium: Goldstone Ground; Attendance: 14,400; Referee: D. Wells

7 December 1963 2nd round	Colchester United	0–1	Queens Park Rangers	Colchester
		Report	Leary 70'	Stadium: Layer Road; Attendance: 6,481; Referee: G. Grundy

== Squad statistics ==
=== Appearances and goals ===
No.	Pos	Nat	Player	Total		Third Division		FA Cup		League Cup	
No.	Pos	Nat	Player	Apps	Goals	Apps	Goals	Apps	Goals	Apps	Goals
	GK	(England) ENG	Percy Ames	20	0	20	0	0	0	0	0
	GK	(Scotland) SCO	George Ramage	31	0	26	0	2	0	3	0
	DF	(Scotland) SCO	Duncan Forbes	36	0	32	0	1	0	3	0
	DF	(Scotland) SCO	John Fowler	25	0	24	0	1	0	0	0
	DF	(England) ENG	Edgar Rumney	5	0	5	0	0	0	0	0
	DF	(England) ENG	Keith Rutter	47	0	42	0	2	0	3	0
	MF	(Scotland) SCO	John Docherty	40	1	36	1	2	0	2	0
	MF	(England) ENG	Roy McCrohan	48	3	43	3	2	0	3	0
	MF	(England) ENG	Derek Trevis	9	0	9	0	0	0	0	0
	FW	(England) ENG	Mike Grice	47	5	42	4	2	0	3	1
	FW	(Scotland) SCO	Bobby Hill	25	0	24	0	0	0	1	0
	FW	(England) ENG	Martyn King	43	20	38	18	2	0	3	2
	FW	(Australia) AUS	Tommy McColl	7	1	7	1	0	0	0	0
	FW	(England) ENG	Tony Miller	1	0	1	0	0	0	0	0
	FW	(Scotland) SCO	Billy Stark	47	17	43	15	2	0	2	2
	FW	(England) ENG	Peter Wright	39	10	34	7	2	0	3	3
Players who appeared for Colchester who left during the season
	DF	(England) ENG	Pat Woods	41	0	36	0	2	0	3	0
	MF	(England) ENG	Ron Hunt	12	0	11	0	0	0	1	0
	FW	(England) ENG	Bobby Hunt	38	23	33	20	2	1	3	2

=== Goalscorers ===
Place	Nationality	Position	Name	Third Division	FA Cup	League Cup	Total
1	(England)	FW	Bobby Hunt	20	1	2	23
2	(England)	CF	Martyn King	18	0	2	20
3	(Scotland)	FW	Billy Stark	15	0	2	17
4	(England)	WG	Peter Wright	7	0	3	10
5	(England)	WG	Mike Grice	4	0	1	5
6	(England)	WH	Roy McCrohan	3	0	0	3
7	(Scotland)	WH	John Docherty	1	0	0	1
7	(Australia)	IF	Tommy McColl	1	0	0	1
			Own goals	1	0	0	1
			TOTALS	70	1	10	81

=== Disciplinary record ===
Nationality	Position	Name	Third Division		FA Cup		League Cup		Total	
Nationality	Position	Name	Booked	Sent off (straight red)	Booked	Sent off (straight red)	Booked	Sent off (straight red)	Booked	Sent off (straight red)
(England)	CF	Martyn King	0	1	0	0	0	0	0	1
(England)	WG	Peter Wright	1	0	0	0	0	0	1	0
		TOTALS	1	1	0	0	0	0	1	1

=== Clean sheets ===
Number of games goalkeepers kept a clean sheet.

Place	Nationality	Player	Third Division	FA Cup	League Cup	Total
1	(Scotland)	George Ramage	8	1	0	9
2	(England)	Percy Ames	4	0	0	4
		TOTALS	12	1	0	13

=== Player debuts ===
Players making their first-team Colchester United debut in a fully competitive match.

Position	Nationality	Player	Date	Opponent	Ground	Notes
FB	(England)	Pat Woods	24 August 1963	Barnsley	Layer Road	
IF	(Australia)	Tommy McColl	24 August 1963	Barnsley	Layer Road	
WH	(Scotland)	John Docherty	14 September 1963	Wrexham	Racecourse Ground	
IF	(England)	Tony Miller	1 February 1964	Queens Park Rangers	Loftus Road	
MF	(England)	Derek Trevis	7 March 1964	Mansfield Town	Layer Road	

== See also ==
- List of Colchester United F.C. seasons
