= 1961–62 Colchester United F.C. season =

Colchester United
1961–62 season
- Chairman: Bill Allen
- Manager: Benny Fenton
- Stadium: Layer Road
- Fourth Division: 2nd (promoted)
- FA Cup: 1st round (eliminated by Peterborough United)
- League Cup: 1st round (eliminated by Crewe Alexandra)
- Top goalscorer: League: Bobby Hunt (38); All: Bobby Hunt (40)
- Highest home attendance: 10,653 v Peterborough United, 6 November 1961
- Lowest home attendance: 3,782 v Oldham Athletic, 23 December 1961
- Average home league attendance: 5,532
- Biggest win: 9–1 v Bradford City, 30 December 1961
- Biggest defeat: 0–5 v York City, 7 October 1961
Home colours

The 1961–62 season was Colchester United's 20th season in their history and their first-ever season in the fourth tier of English football, the Fourth Division. Alongside competing in the Fourth Division, the club also participated in the FA Cup and the League Cup.

Colchester bounced back to the Third Division at the first time of asking, earning their first promotion in the club's history by finishing as runners–up. By the end of the campaign, Colchester trailed Millwall by just one point, winning 23 games and scoring 104 league goals with Bobby Hunt the division's top scorer. The club experienced their record victory during the season when they beat Bradford City 9–1 on 30 December.

In the cup competitions, first-round exits were experienced in both FA and League cups. Colchester were beaten at home to Crewe Alexandra in September in the League Cup, while it took Peterborough United three attempts to overcome Colchester in the FA Cup first round following a second replay.

== Season overview ==
At the end of a very disappointing 1960–61 season, manager Benny Fenton cut his playing squad by ten players, with players including Neil Langman, Chic Milligan and Tommy Williams all released. The club was over £3,300 in debt, and so a fresh start required for the new season with a new, slimline squad. Just 17 players would be used in the new campaign, with eight of those playing over 40 of the 44 league games possible.

The season started well for Colchester, unbeaten in their first nine league games and scoring 31 goals in the first eight home games to top the Fourth Division table.

During Colchester's heaviest defeat of the season, a 5–0 reverse at York City, the 20-month old son of full back Tommy Millar drowned in a garden pond accident while Millar was playing in the game. This tragedy would also spell the end of Millar's Colchester career when he left to return to Scotland in early 1962. This coincided with a poor run of form and the club slipped to third in the table.

On the back of a 4–1 Boxing Day defeat to Bradford City, Colchester set their record club victory in the return fixture at Layer Road on 30 December. Both Bobby Hunt and strike–partner Martyn King scored four goals each, with Bobby Hill scoring the other as Colchester ran out 9–1 winners. A 4–0 victory at Accrington Stanley saw United regain the top spot from Wrexham, but just a few weeks later, Accrington folded and Colchester's 3–2 and 4–0 wins were expunged.

Defeats to Millwall and Wrexham cost Colchester the championship. Millwall took the title by one point as United finished runners-up with eleven away defeats proving costly. Of the record 104 goals scored in the league during the season, 78 came at home, while Martyn King broke his seasonal record by scoring 31 league goals only to be surpassed by Bobby Hunt with 38, a new club record. Hunt scored three hat-tricks on his way to his tally of 38 with two of those four goal hauls.

== Players ==
As of match played 30 April 1962.

Name	Position	Nationality	Place of birth	Date of birth	Apps	Goals	Signed from	Date signed	Fee
Goalkeepers
Percy Ames	GK	(England)	Plymouth	13 December 1931 (aged 29)	287	0	(England) Tottenham Hotspur	1 May 1955	Free transfer
Defenders
Duncan Forbes	CB	(Scotland)	Edinburgh	19 June 1941 (aged 19)	0	0	(Scotland) Musselburgh Athletic	4 September 1961	Nominal
John Fowler	FB	(Scotland)	Leith	17 October 1933 (aged 27)	250	5	(Scotland) Bonnyrigg Rose Athletic	20 August 1955 (Note: Date of signing refers to the date of the player's first game for the club)	Free transfer
Richie Griffiths	FB	(England)	Earls Colne	21 March 1942 (aged 19)	0	0	(England) Colchester Casuals	June 1961	Free transfer
Mick Loughton	CB	(England)	Colchester	8 December 1942 (aged 18)	0	0	Amateur	August 1961	Free transfer
Alf Marshall	FB	(England)	Dagenham	21 May 1933 (aged 28)	30	0	(England) Dagenham	14 October 1957	£25
Edgar Rumney	FB	(England)	Abberton	15 September 1936 (aged 24)	23	0	(England) Colchester Casuals	1 May 1957	Free transfer
Midfielders
Brian Abrey	WH	(England)	Hendon	25 April 1939 (aged 22)	0	0	(England) Chelsea	1 May 1961	Free transfer
John Brown	WH	(Scotland)	Edinburgh	6 March 1940 (aged 21)	0	0	(Scotland) Dunbar United	4 September 1961	Nominal
Trevor Harris	WH	(England)	Colchester	6 February 1936 (aged 25)	42	2	Amateur	July 1951	Free transfer
Ron Hunt	WH	(England)	Colchester	26 September 1933 (aged 27)	94	1	Amateur	October 1951	Free transfer
Forwards
John Baines	CF	(England)	Colchester	25 September 1937 (aged 23)	3	0	(England) Colchester Casuals	January 1960	Free transfer
David Coleman	CF	(England)	Colchester	27 March 1942 (aged 19)	0	0	(England) Harwich & Parkeston	18 November 1961	Free transfer
Mike Foster	WG	(England)	Leicester	3 February 1939 (aged 22)	0	0	(England) Leicester City	May 1961	Nominal
Bobby Hill	IF	(Scotland)	Edinburgh	9 June 1938 (aged 22)	138	15	(Scotland) Easthouses Lily Miners Welfare	9 June 1955	Free transfer
Tony Howe	WG	(England)	Colchester	14 February 1939 (aged 22)	10	2	(England) Colchester Casuals	March 1960	Free transfer
Bobby Hunt	FW	(England)	Colchester	1 October 1942 (aged 18)	30	7	Amateur	March 1960	Free transfer
Martyn King	CF	(England)	Birmingham	23 August 1937 (aged 23)	87	56	Amateur	Summer 1955	Free transfer
Colin Lundstrum	WG	(England)	Colchester	9 October 1938 (aged 22)	0	0	(England) Ipswich Town	August 1961	Free transfer
Sammy McLeod	IF	(Scotland)	Glasgow	4 January 1934 (aged 27)	141	22	(Scotland) Easthouses Lily Miners Welfare	20 August 1955	Free transfer
Tony Miller	IF	(England)	Chelmsford	26 October 1937 (aged 23)	0	0	Amateur	May 1958	Free transfer
Peter Wright	WG	(England)	Colchester	26 January 1934 (aged 27)	323	67	Amateur	November 1951	Free transfer

== Transfers ==
=== In ===
Date	Position	Nationality	Name	From	Fee	Ref.
May 1961	WG	(England)	Mike Foster	(England) Leicester City	Nominal	
1 May 1961	WH	(England)	Brian Abrey	(England) Chelsea	Free transfer	
June 1961	FB	(England)	Richie Griffiths	(England) Colchester Casuals	Free transfer	
August 1961	CB	(England)	Mick Loughton	Amateur	Free transfer	
August 1961	WG	(England)	Colin Lundstrum	(England) Ipswich Town	Free transfer	
4 September 1961	WH	(Scotland)	John Brown	(Scotland) Dunbar United	Nominal	
4 September 1961	CB	(Scotland)	Duncan Forbes	(Scotland) Musselburgh Athletic	Nominal	
18 November 1961	CF	(England)	David Coleman	(England) Harwich & Parkeston	Free transfer	(Note: Date of signing refers to the date of the player's first game for the club)

=== Out ===
Date	Position	Nationality	Name	To	Fee	Ref.
End of season	GK	(England)	John Wright	(England) Great Bentley	Released	
End of season	WH	(England)	Cyril Hammond	(England) Severalls Athletic	Released	
End of season	FB	(England)	John Laidlaw	(England) Clacton Town	Released	
End of season	WH	(England)	Derek Parker	(England) Stowmarket Town	Player-manager	
End of season	WG	(England)	Tommy Williams	(England) Watford	Released	
Summer 1961	FB	(England)	Peter Carey	(England) Aldershot	Released	
Summer 1961	FB	(England)	Alan Eagles	(England) Queens Park Rangers	Released	
27 January 1962	FB	(Scotland)	Tommy Millar	(Scotland) Dundee United	Free transfer	(Note: Date of departure refers to the date of the player's final game for the club)

== Match details ==
=== Fourth Division ===
==== Results round by round ====
Round	1	2	3	4	5	6	7	8	9	10	11	12	13	14	15	16	17	18	19	20	21	22	23	24	25	26	27	28	29	30	31	32	33	34	35	36	37	38	39	40	41	42	43	44
Ground	H	H	A	A	A	A	H	A	A	H	H	H	A	A	H	A	H	H	A	A	H	A	H	A	H	A	H	H	A	H	A	H	A	H	A	H	A	H	A	H	H	A	A	H
Result	W	W	D	D	W	W	W	W	L	W	W	W	L	D	D	L	D	D	W	W	L	W	W	L	W	L	W	W	D	W	L	W	L	W	L	W	L	D	L	W	W	L	D	W
Position	6	1	1	1	2	1	1	1	2	1	1	1	2	1	1	3	3	3	2	2	2	2	2	2	2	2	2	1	1	1	1	1	1	1	1	1	2	1	3	3	2	3	3	2

Source: 11v11.com
A = Away; H = Home; W = Win; D = Draw; L = Loss

==== League table ====
Pos	Team	Pld	W	D	L	GF	GA	GAv	Pts	Promotion or relegation
1	Millwall (C, P)	44	23	10	11	87	62	1.403	56	Promotion to the Third Division
2	Colchester United (P)	44	23	9	12	104	71	1.465	55	Promotion to the Third Division
3	Wrexham (P)	44	22	9	13	96	56	1.714	53	Promotion to the Third Division
4	Carlisle United (P)	44	22	8	14	64	63	1.016	52	Promotion to the Third Division
5	Bradford City	44	21	9	14	94	86	1.093	51	

Source: rsssf.com
(C) Champions; (P) Promoted

==== Matches ====
19 August 1961 1	Colchester United	3–0	Stockport County	Colchester
	B. Hunt; King; Wright	Report		Stadium: Layer Road; Attendance: 4,318

21 August 1961 2	Colchester United	2–0	Carlisle United	Colchester
	King 80'; Millar 87'	Report		Stadium: Layer Road; Attendance: 4,979

26 August 1961 3	Oldham Athletic	2–2	Colchester United	Oldham
	Shackleton 22'; Johnstone 61'	Report	Foster 9'; King 52'	Stadium: Boundary Park; Attendance: 15,746

29 August 1961 4	Carlisle United	1–1	Colchester United	Carlisle
	Unknown goalscorer	Report	King	Stadium: Brunton Park; Attendance: 8,547

2 September 1961	Colchester United	3–2	Accrington Stanley	Colchester
	King; Millar	Report	Unknown goalscorer	Stadium: Layer Road; Attendance: 5,129
Note: Result expunged due Accrington Stanley withdrawing from the league with 33 matches played.

5 September 1961 5	Doncaster Rovers	1–4	Colchester United	Doncaster
	Unknown goalscorer	Report	B. Hunt; King; Foster	Stadium: Belle Vue; Attendance: 3,705

9 September 1961 6	Darlington	0–2	Colchester United	Darlington
		Report	B. Hunt; King	Stadium: Feethams; Attendance: 8,958

16 September 1961 7	Colchester United	6–1	Hartlepools United	Colchester
	B. Hunt; Foster; Millar	Report; Report	Edgar	Stadium: Layer Road; Attendance: 5,036

21 September 1961 8	Workington	1–2	Colchester United	Workington
	Unknown goalscorer	Report	B. Hunt; King	Stadium: Borough Park; Attendance: 5,914

23 September 1961 9	Southport	3–0	Colchester United	Southport
	Blain; Blore; Jones	Report; Report		Stadium: Haig Avenue; Attendance: 5,258

25 September 1961 10	Colchester United	6–1	Workington	Colchester
	B. Hunt; King; Wright; Harris (pen.)	Report	Unknown goalscorer	Stadium: Layer Road; Attendance: 5,961

30 September 1961 11	Colchester United	3–0	Tranmere Rovers	Colchester
	B. Hunt; King	Report		Stadium: Layer Road; Attendance: 6,446

2 October 1961 12	Colchester United	5–2	Chester	Colchester
	B. Hunt; McLeod; Millar	Report	Clarke; Davies	Stadium: Layer Road; Attendance: 7,148

7 October 1961 13	York City	5–0	Colchester United	Colchester
	Unknown goalscorer	Report		Stadium: Layer Road; Attendance: 5,714

11 October 1961 14	Chester	2–2	Colchester United	Chester
	Clarke; Davies	Report	B. Hunt; King	Stadium: Sealand Road; Attendance: 7,186

14 October 1961 15	Colchester United	3–3	Chesterfield	Colchester
	B. Hunt; McLeod; Harris	Report	Unknown goalscorer	Stadium: Layer Road; Attendance: 6,043

21 October 1961 16	Gillingham	2–1	Colchester United	Gillingham
	Unknown goalscorer	Report	B. Hunt	Stadium: Priestfield Stadium; Attendance: 8,962

28 October 1961 17	Colchester United	2–2	Millwall	Colchester
	B. Hunt 30'; Abrey 87'; King (red card) 13'	Report	Obeney 34'; McQuade 45'; Brady (red card) 13'	Stadium: Layer Road; Attendance: 6,868

11 November 1961 18	Colchester United	1–1	Barrow	Colchester
	B. Hunt	Report	Unknown goalscorer	Stadium: Layer Road; Attendance: 4,553

18 November 1961 19	Rochdale	0–1	Colchester United	Rochdale
		Report	B. Hunt	Stadium: Spotland Stadium; Attendance: 4,618

2 December 1961 20	Exeter City	0–2	Colchester United	Exeter
		Report	B. Hunt	Stadium: St James Park; Attendance: 4,530

9 December 1961 21	Colchester United	2–4	Wrexham	Colchester
	B. Hunt; King	Report	Unknown goalscorer	Stadium: Layer Road; Attendance: 5,587

16 December 1961 22	Stockport County	1–4	Colchester United	Stockport
	Ward	Report	B. Hunt; King; Wright	Stadium: Edgeley Park; Attendance: 2,803

23 December 1961 23	Colchester United	5–1	Oldham Athletic	Colchester
	B. Hunt; King; Wright	Report	Unknown goalscorer	Stadium: Layer Road; Attendance: 3,782

26 December 1961 24	Bradford City	4–1	Colchester United	Bradford
	Unknown goalscorer	Report	King	Stadium: Valley Parade; Attendance: 5,571

30 December 1961 25	Colchester United	9–1	Bradford City	Colchester
	Hill 1'; B. Hunt 28' (pen.); King 34'	Report	Tait 18'	Stadium: Layer Road; Attendance: 4,415; Referee: J. Finney

13 January 1962	Accrington Stanley	0–4	Colchester United	Accrington
		Report	B. Hunt; Foster; Wright	Stadium: Peel Park; Attendance: 1,411
Note: Result expunged due Accrington Stanley withdrawing from the league with 33 matches played.

15 January 1962 26	Mansfield Town	4–0	Colchester United	Mansfield
	Unknown goalscorer	Report		Stadium: Field Mill; Attendance: 5,880

20 January 1962 27	Colchester United	2–0	Darlington	Colchester
	King 68'; B. Hunt 85'	Report		Stadium: Layer Road; Attendance: 4,923

27 January 1962 28	Colchester United	5–3	Crewe Alexandra	Colchester
	Wright 14'; B. Hunt 17', 79'; King 36'; Harris 60' (pen.)	Report	Wheatley 27'; Smith 59'; Morgans	Stadium: Layer Road; Attendance: 5,435

3 February 1962 29	Hartlepools United	1–1	Colchester United	Hartlepool
	Bircham	Report; Report	King 25'	Stadium: Victoria Park; Attendance: 6,738; Referee: P. Rhodes

10 February 1962 30	Colchester United	2–0	Southport	Colchester
	B. Hunt 4'; Hill 83'	Report; Report		Stadium: Layer Road; Attendance: 5,379

17 February 1962 31	Tranmere Rovers	5–2	Colchester United	Birkenhead
	Unknown goalscorer	Report	King; Wright	Stadium: Prenton Park; Attendance: 6,481

24 February 1962 32	Colchester United	3–1	York City	Colchester
	Wright 32'; B. Hunt; King	Report	Fountain	Stadium: Layer Road; Attendance: 4,633; Referee: E. Jennings

3 March 1962 33	Chesterfield	4–1	Colchester United	Chesterfield
	Poole 5', 36', 40'	Report	King 27'	Stadium: Saltergate; Attendance: 2,906

10 March 1962 34	Colchester United	6–0	Gillingham	Colchester
	Foster 7', 80'; King 27'; Hill 47'; Wright 51'; B. Hunt 61'	Report		Stadium: Layer Road; Attendance: 4,503; Referee: C. Woan

17 March 1962 35	Millwall	2–0	Colchester United	New Cross
	Broadfoot 13', 64'	Report		Stadium: The Old Den; Attendance: 16,585; Referee: G. Pullin

23 March 1962 36	Colchester United	2–0	Mansfield Town	Colchester
	Foster 18'; King 78'	Report		Stadium: Layer Road; Attendance: 5,730

31 March 1962 37	Barrow	4–0	Colchester United	Barrow-in-Furness
	Howard 39'; Kemp 74'; Robertson 82'; Maddison 88'	Report		Stadium: Holker Street; Attendance: 3,672; Referee: H. Wilson

7 April 1962 38	Colchester United	1–1	Rochdale	Colchester
	B. Hunt 70'	Report	Richardson 79'	Stadium: Layer Road; Attendance: 4,616

14 April 1962 39	Crewe Alexandra	4–0	Colchester United	Crewe
	Lord 10', 88'; Tighe 42'; Wheatley 89'	Report		Stadium: Gresty Road; Attendance: 6,456; Referee: P. Brandwood

20 April 1962 40	Colchester United	3–0	Aldershot	Colchester
	Wright 47'; Harris 76' (pen.); McLeod 90'	Report		Stadium: Layer Road; Attendance: 6,399; Referee: J. Cooke

21 April 1962 41	Colchester United	2–1	Exeter City	Colchester
	King 17'; Wright 60'	Report	Unknown goalscorer	Stadium: Layer Road; Attendance: 5,530

23 April 1962 42	Aldershot	1–0	Colchester United	Aldershot
	Norris 18'	Report		Stadium: Recreation Ground; Attendance: 6,338; Referee: A. Mason

28 April 1962 43	Wrexham	0–0	Colchester United	Wrexham
		Report		Stadium: Racecourse Ground; Attendance: 16,027

30 April 1962 44	Colchester United	5–3	Doncaster Rovers	Colchester
	King 40'; B. Hunt 41', 43', 58', 60' (pen.)	Report	Larkin 35', 61' (pen.); Bonson 80'	Stadium: Layer Road; Attendance: 6,108

=== League Cup ===
13 September 1961 1st round	Colchester United	1–2	Crewe Alexandra	Colchester
	King	Report	Unknown goalscorer	Stadium: Layer Road; Attendance: 4,806

=== FA Cup ===
4 November 1961 1st round	Peterborough United	3–3	Colchester United	Peterborough
	McNamee 43'; Bly 48'; Hudson 69'	Report; Report	Abrey 75'; Wright 84'; B. Hunt 87'	Stadium: London Road Stadium; Attendance: 16,469; Referee: T. Dawes

6 November 1961 1st round replay	Colchester United	2–2	Peterborough United	Colchester
	King 40'; B. Hunt 86'	Report; Report	Bly 75'; Emery 88'	Stadium: Layer Road; Attendance: 10,653

13 November 1961 1st round 2nd replay	Colchester United	0–3	Peterborough United	Norwich
		Report; Report	Hudson 11', 31', 43'	Stadium: Carrow Road; Attendance: 11,857

== Squad statistics ==
=== Appearances and goals ===
No.	Pos	Nat	Player	Total		Fourth Division		FA Cup		League Cup	
No.	Pos	Nat	Player	Apps	Goals	Apps	Goals	Apps	Goals	Apps	Goals
	GK	(England) ENG	Percy Ames	48	0	44	0	3	0	1	0
	DF	(Scotland) SCO	Duncan Forbes	6	0	6	0	0	0	0	0
	DF	(Scotland) SCO	John Fowler	48	0	44	0	3	0	1	0
	DF	(England) ENG	Richie Griffiths	16	0	16	0	0	0	0	0
	DF	(England) ENG	Edgar Rumney	2	0	2	0	0	0	0	0
	MF	(England) ENG	Brian Abrey	42	2	38	1	3	1	1	0
	MF	(England) ENG	Trevor Harris	47	4	43	4	3	0	1	0
	MF	(England) ENG	Ron Hunt	48	0	44	0	3	0	1	0
	FW	(England) ENG	David Coleman	1	0	1	0	0	0	0	0
	FW	(England) ENG	Mike Foster	40	8	36	8	3	0	1	0
	FW	(Scotland) SCO	Bobby Hill	44	3	40	3	3	0	1	0
	FW	(England) ENG	Bobby Hunt	47	40	43	38	3	2	1	0
	FW	(England) ENG	Martyn King	46	33	43	31	2	1	1	1
	FW	(England) ENG	Colin Lundstrum	1	0	1	0	0	0	0	0
	FW	(Scotland) SCO	Sammy McLeod	13	3	12	3	1	0	0	0
	FW	(England) ENG	Peter Wright	48	13	44	12	3	1	1	0
Players who appeared for Colchester who left during the season
	DF	(Scotland) SCO	Tommy Millar	31	4	27	4	3	0	1	0

=== Goalscorers ===
Place	Nationality	Position	Name	Fourth Division	FA Cup	League Cup	Total
1	(England)	FW	Bobby Hunt	38	2	0	40
2	(England)	CF	Martyn King	31	1	1	33
3	(England)	WG	Peter Wright	12	1	0	13
4	(England)	WG	Mike Foster	8	0	0	8
5	(England)	WH	Trevor Harris	4	0	0	4
5	(Scotland)	FB	Tommy Millar	4	0	0	4
7	(Scotland)	IF	Bobby Hill	3	0	0	3
7	(Scotland)	IF	Sammy McLeod	3	0	0	3
9	(England)	WH	Brian Abrey	1	1	0	2
			Own goals	0	0	0	0
			TOTALS	104	5	1	110

=== Disciplinary record ===
Nationality	Position	Name	Fourth Division		FA Cup		League Cup		Total	
Nationality	Position	Name	Booked	Sent off (straight red)	Booked	Sent off (straight red)	Booked	Sent off (straight red)	Booked	Sent off (straight red)
(England)	CF	Martyn King	0	1	0	0	0	0	0	1
		TOTALS	0	1	0	0	0	0	0	1

=== Clean sheets ===
Number of games goalkeepers kept a clean sheet.

Place	Nationality	Player	Fourth Division	FA Cup	League Cup	Total
1	(England)	Percy Ames	12	0	0	12
		TOTALS	12	0	0	12

=== Player debuts ===
Players making their first-team Colchester United debut in a fully competitive match.

Position	Nationality	Player	Date	Opponent	Ground	Notes
WH	(England)	Brian Abrey	19 August 1961	Stockport County	Layer Road	
WG	(England)	Mike Foster	19 August 1961	Stockport County	Layer Road	
CF	(England)	David Coleman	18 November 1961	Rochdale	Spotland Stadium	
WG	(England)	Colin Lundstrum	15 January 1962	Mansfield Town	Field Mill	
FB	(England)	Richie Griffiths	3 February 1962	Hartlepools United	Victoria Park	
CB	(Scotland)	Duncan Forbes	14 April 1962	Crewe Alexandra	Gresty Road	

== See also ==
- List of Colchester United F.C. seasons
