= Michael Foster =

Michael or Mike Foster may refer to:

== Entertainment ==
- Michael Foster (American writer) (1904–1956), novelist, journalist, and cartoonist
- Michael Foster (agent) (born 1958), British former talent agent and political candidate
- Michael Foster (musician) (born 1964), American drummer of the rock band FireHouse
- M. A. Foster (Michael Anthony Foster, 1939–2020), American author/writer
- Michael Lewis Foster, American filmmaker

== Politics ==
- Mike Foster (American politician) (1930–2020), former governor of Louisiana
- Michael Foster (Hastings and Rye MP) (born 1946), British politician
- Mike Foster (Worcester MP) (born 1963), British politician
- Mike Foster (Canadian politician), of Toronto, Ontario
- Michael Abu Sakara Foster (born 1958), Ghanaian agronomist and politician

== Sports ==
- Michael Foster (cricketer, born 1972), English cricketer
- Michael Foster (cricketer, born 1973), Australian cricketer
- Michael Foster (cricketer, born 1979), former English cricketer
- Mike Foster (footballer) (born 1939), English footballer
- Michael Foster (footballer) (born 1985), Papua New Guinean midfielder
- Michael G. Foster (1940–2021), founder of Yoshukai International karate
- Michael Foster Jr. (born 2003), American basketball player

== Other people ==
- Michael Foster (English judge) (1689–1763), English judge
- Michael Foster (physiologist) (1836–1907), British physiologist and member of parliament (MP)
- Michael Foster (philosopher) (1903–1959), tutor in philosophy at Oxford University
- Michael John Foster (scoutmaster) (born 1952), British Scout leader and Anglican priest
- Michael Foster (folklorist), American folklore professor
- Michael Foster (Tolkien scholar) (1946–2023), emeritus professor of English and Tolkien scholar
- Mike Foster, American activist, co-founder of XXXchurch.com
- Michael G. Foster (businessman) (1937–2003), Seattle finance executive, benefactor of Foster School of Business

== Fictional characters ==
- Michael Foster, a character in the 2013 thriller film The Call

== See also ==
- Michael Forster (disambiguation)
- Michael John Foster (disambiguation)
