= Michael John Foster =

Michael John Foster may refer to:

- Michael Foster (Worcester MP) (born 1963), British Labour Party politician
- Michael John Foster (Scouting) (born 1952), British Scout leader and Anglican priest

== See also ==
- Michael Foster (disambiguation)
