= Cecil Allen =

Cecil Allen may refer to:

- Cecil Allan (1914–2003), Northern Irish footballer
- Cecil J. Allen (1886–1973), British railway engineer and technical journalist and writer
