= Michael Forster =

Michael Forster may refer to:

- Michael Neil Forster (born 1957), American philosopher
- Michael Forster (artist) (1907–2002), Anglo-Canadian abstract artist
- Michael Foster Jr. (born 2003), basketball power forward in the Israeli Basketball Premier League

== See also ==
- Michael Foster (disambiguation)
