= Brian Abrey =

English footballer (born 1939)

Personal information
- Full name: Brian Anthony Abrey
- Date of birth: 25 April 1939 (age 87)
- Place of birth: Hendon, London, England
- Height: 5 ft 11 in (1.80 m)
- Position: Wing half

Youth career
- 1955–1961: Chelsea

Senior career*
Years	Team	Apps	(Gls)
1961–1963	Colchester United	38	(1)
Total		38	(1)
- * Club domestic league appearances and goals

Brian Anthony Abrey (born 25 April 1939) is an English former footballer who played as a wing half in the Football League for Colchester United. Having begun his career at Chelsea, Abrey spent one full season at Colchester before having to retire through injury.

== Career ==
Born in Hendon, London, Abrey was invited to join Chelsea in 1955 by manager Ted Drake, but never managed to break into the first-team during his five-year stay. After representing a New York team in the inaugural International Soccer League in the summer of 1960, Abrey joined Colchester United, where he would make his Football League debut on 19 August 1961 in a 3–0 win over Stockport County. He scored his first professional goal in a 2–2 draw with Millwall on 28 October 1961, and scored his second and final goal for the U's in the following match on 4 November 1961 in a 3–3 FA Cup draw with Peterborough United at London Road. He helped Colchester gain promotion to the Third Division as the U's finished the season as Fourth Division runners-up.

Abrey could only manage one appearance in the 1962–63 season, a 2–0 defeat to Northampton Town in the second round of the League Cup on 26 September 1962 as he was forced to retire from playing following a recurring knee injury in April 1963, having made 38 league appearances and scoring one goal.

== Later life ==
Following his retirement from playing, Abrey returned to his native Hendon where he worked at a school, before becoming a drayman and later a postman in the area.

== Career statistics ==
Appearances and goals by club, season and competition
Club	Season	League			FA Cup		League Cup		Total	
Club	Season	Division	Apps	Goals	Apps	Goals	Apps	Goals	Apps	Goals
Colchester United	1961–62	Fourth Division	38	1	3	1	1	0	42	2
Colchester United	1962–63	Third Division	0	0	0	0	1	0	1	0
Career total			38	1	3	1	2	0	43	2
