= John Baines (footballer) =

English footballer

Personal information
- Full name: John Robert Baines
- Date of birth: 25 September 1937 (age 89)
- Place of birth: Colchester, England
- Height: 5 ft 11 in (1.80 m)
- Position: Forward

Senior career*
| Years | Team | Apps | (Gls) |
- Colchester Casuals
| 1960–1963 | Colchester United | 4 | (0) |
- Lexden Wanderers
- South Australia
- Port Adelaide
- Lion SC
- Elizabeth City
| Total | | 4 | (0) |
- * Club domestic league appearances and goals

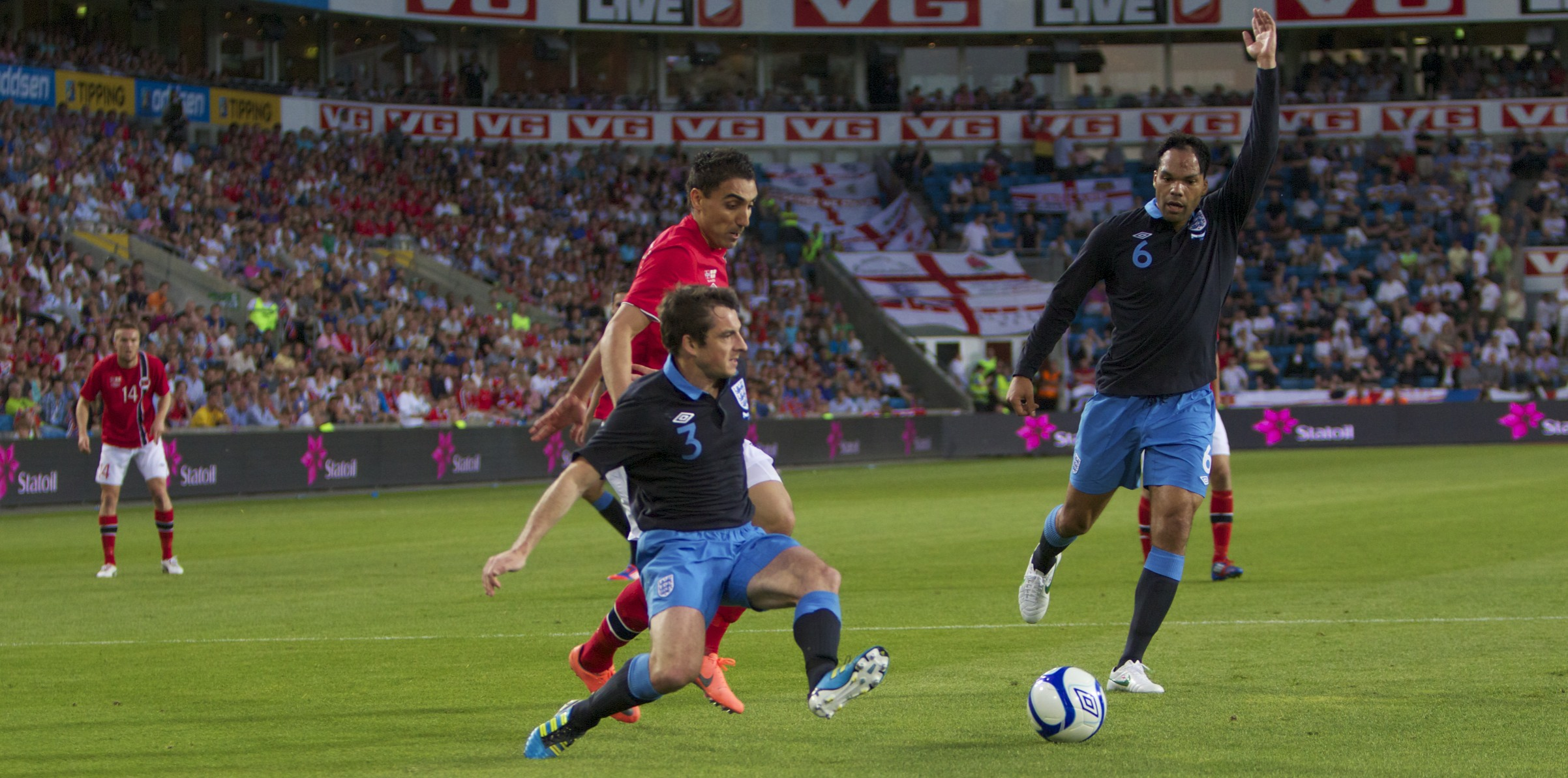

John Robert Baines (born 25 September 1937) is an English former footballer who played as a forward in the Football League for Colchester United.

== Career ==
Born in Colchester, Baines joined his hometown club Colchester United from local amateur side Colchester Casuals, signing a professional deal in January 1960 following his national service. Baines made his first-team debut replacing the injured Neil Langman for three matches, making his debut in a 3–1 win at Layer Road against Halifax Town on 4 March.

Unable to break into the first-team during the promotion winning season of 1961–62, Baines made one final appearance for the club on 1 September 1962, a 1–1 draw with Bournemouth at Dean Court, replacing Martyn King who had been given permission by manager Benny Fenton to appear in a table tennis tournament. This brought Baines' total appearance figure for the club to four.

After playing his final game, Baines left United, joining local club Lexden Wanderers before emigrating to Australia. There, he played for South Australia, Port Adelaide, Lion SC and Elizabeth City, the latter managed by former U's player Sammy McLeod.
