= Ian Hamilton (footballer, born 1940) =

English footballer (1940–2021)

Personal information
- Date of birth: 12 September 1940
- Place of birth: Thornbury, England
- Date of death: 25 April 2021 (aged 80)
- Place of death: Bristol, England
- Position: Inside forward

Youth career
- Thornbury Town

Senior career*
| Years | Team | Apps | (Gls) |
| 1956–1968 | Bristol Rovers | 149 | (60) |
| 1967 | → Exeter City (loan) | 4 | (1) |
| 1968–1969 | Newport County | 15 | (2) |
| 1970–1972 | Weston-super-Mare | | |
| 1972–1974 | Welton Rovers | | |
| Total | | 168 | (63) |
- * Club domestic league appearances and goals

Ian Hamilton (12 September 1940 – 25 April 2021) was an English professional footballer who played for Bristol Rovers, Exeter City and Newport County in a thirteen-year career in The Football League.

== Life ==
Hamilton was born in Thornbury in 1940 and is the son of former Bristol Rovers player John Hamilton, who made 63 League appearances for The Pirates between 1929 and 1931. He began playing as a child for Thornbury Town, another of his father's former teams, and initially joined Bristol Rovers as an amateur in 1956, a move which mirrored his older brother David who had also joined Rovers from Thornbury but died in a bungalow fire in Olveston before making any League appearances.

After two years as an amateur, Hamilton became a part-time professional in January 1958, aged 17, and made his first team debut in the 1958–59 season. He made eleven League appearances in his first three seasons as a paid player before finally becoming fully professional in December 1961 at the age of 21. He was Bristol Rovers' top goalscorer during the 1964–65 season with twenty-one goals, and in all he played 149 League games for the club and scored 60 goals but became plagued by an ongoing knee problem later in his time in Bristol. He had a brief loan spell at Exeter City during the 1967–68 season and spent a year with Newport County the following campaign, but his knee trouble forced him to retire from the professional game in 1969.

Hamilton returned to non-League football in 1970, spending two years at Weston-super-Mare and a further two at Welton Rovers from 1972 until 1974, when he returned to Weston as assistant manager. His non-footballing career was spent as an airframe fitter with Rolls-Royce in Patchway, from where he took early retirement in 1994.

In his later life Hamilton lived in Rudgeway with his wife Betty and was a cricket and golf fan. He has two children, Stephen and Sarah. Stephen, like his father, is an accomplished sportsman and played senior cricket for a number of clubs in the Bristol area. Ian was a member of Gloucestershire County Cricket Club and has travelled to see England play in locations including Australia, Barbados and South Africa.

== Football League career stats ==
| Season | Team | Division | League apps | League goals |
|---|---|---|---|---|
| 1958–59 | Bristol Rovers | Division Two | 1 | 0 |
| 1959–60 | Bristol Rovers | Division Two | 5 | 3 |
| 1960–61 | Bristol Rovers | Division Two | 5 | 3 |
| 1961–62 | Bristol Rovers | Division Two | 10 | 4 |
| 1962–63 | Bristol Rovers | Division Three | 31 | 10 |
| 1963–64 | Bristol Rovers | Division Three | 40 | 14 |
| 1964–65 | Bristol Rovers | Division Three | 33 | 21 |
| 1965–66 | Bristol Rovers | Division Three | 12 | 2 |
| 1966–67 | Bristol Rovers | Division Three | 11 | 3 |
| 1967–68 | Bristol Rovers | Division Three | 1 | 0 |
| 1967–68 | Exeter City (loan) | Division Four | 4 | 1 |
| 1968–69 | Newport County | Division Four | 15 | 2 |

== Sources ==
- Jay, Mike; Byrne, Stephen (1994). Pirates in Profile: A Who's Who of Bristol Rovers Players. Bristol: Potten, Baber & Murray. p. 110. ISBN 0-9524835-0-5.
- Leesdad, Mark (2007). Life After Bristol Rovers. Stroud: Stadia. p. 44. ISBN 978-0-7524-4153-5.
