= David Laitt (footballer) =

English footballer

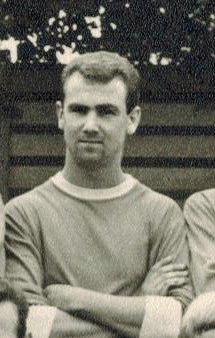

Personal information
- Full name: David John Laitt
- Date of birth: 1 November 1946 (age 79)
- Place of birth: Colchester, England
- Position: Full-back

Youth career
- Colchester Casuals
- Colchester United

Senior career*
Years	Team	Apps	(Gls)
1965–1966	Colchester United	1	(0)
- Crittall Athletic
Total		1	(0)
- * Club domestic league appearances and goals

David John Laitt (born 1 November 1946) is an English former footballer who played in the Football League as a full-back for Colchester United.

== Career ==
Born in Colchester, Laitt joined hometown club Colchester United as an apprentice from local amateur team Colchester Casuals. He made one appearance for the U's in the Football League during a 0–0 Fourth Division home draw with Southport on 30 October 1965. He came on as a 40th-minute substitute for Reg Stratton. He failed to make any further appearances for the first-team, signing for Crittall Athletic following his release from the club.
