= Barry Tait =

English footballer (1938–2020)

Personal information
- Full name: Barry Stuart Tait
- Date of birth: 17 June 1938
- Place of birth: York, England
- Date of death: 23 October 2020 (aged 82)
- Height: 5 ft 6 in (1.68 m)
- Position: Inside forward

Youth career
- Doncaster Rovers

Senior career*
Years	Team	Apps	(Gls)
1958–1961	York City	15	(5)
1961	Peterborough United	0	(0)
1961–1962	Bradford City	20	(10)
1962–1963	Halifax Town	36	(23)
1963–1964	Crewe Alexandra	9	(2)
1964–1965	Notts County	4	(0)
- Scarborough
Total		83	(40)

Managerial career
- York Railway Institute
- * Club domestic league appearances and goals

Barry Stuart Tait (17 June 1938 – 23 October 2020) was an English professional footballer who played as an inside forward.

== Career ==
Born in York, Tait played for Doncaster Rovers, York City, Peterborough United, Bradford City, Halifax Town, Crewe Alexandra, Notts County and Scarborough. He later worked as assistant coach and scout for York City, watched players for Manchester United and set up a development centre in York for Leeds United. He also served as manager of York Railway Institute.
