= John Docherty (footballer, born 1935) =

Scottish footballer (born 1935)

Personal information
- Full name: John McSwager Docherty
- Date of birth: 28 February 1935 (age 91)
- Place of birth: Glasgow, Scotland
- Position: Wing half

Youth career
- Maryhill

Senior career*
Years	Team	Apps	(Gls)
?–1953	Maryhill	?	(?)
1953–1955	Albion Rovers	24	(3)
1955–1956	Petershill	?	(?)
1956–1959	Stirling Albion	11	(2)
1958–1960	St Johnstone	94	(10)
1960–1963	Heart of Midlothian	12	(1)
1963–1965	Colchester United	77	(2)
1965–1968	Chelmsford City	?	(?)
- * Club domestic league appearances and goals

John Docherty (born 28 February 1935) is a Scottish former professional footballer who played as a wing half for football league club Colchester United and played Scottish league football for Albion Rovers, Stirling Albion, St Johnstone and Hearts.
