= John Fraser (footballer, born 1938) =

Northern Ireland footballer

Personal information
- Date of birth: 15 September 1938
- Place of birth: Belfast, Northern Ireland
- Date of death: 2011 (aged 72–73)
- Position: Right winger

Senior career*
Years	Team	Apps	(Gls)
- Glentoran
1958–1960	Sunderland	22	(1)
1960–1961	Portsmouth	1	(0)
1961–1962	Margate		
1962–1964	Watford	24	(3)
- Durban City
Total		47	(4)
- * Club domestic league appearances and goals

John Fraser (15 September 1938 – 2011) was a footballer from Northern Ireland who played in the Football League for Sunderland, Portsmouth and Watford.
