= Alan Stephenson =

English footballer

Personal information
- Date of birth: 26 September 1944 (age 82)
- Place of birth: Chesham, Buckinghamshire, England
- Height: 6 ft 0 in (1.83 m)
- Position: Defender

Youth career
- Crystal Palace

Senior career*
Years	Team	Apps	(Gls)
1962–1968	Crystal Palace	170	(13)
1968–1972	West Ham United	108	(0)
1971–1972	→ Fulham (loan)	10	(0)
1972–1975	Portsmouth	98	(0)
1975–1977	Durban United		

International career^{‡}
	England Under-23 team	7	(0)
- * Club domestic league appearances and goals as of 09:00, 9 July 2011 (UTC) ‡ National team caps and goals as of 09:00 9 July 2011 (UTC)

Alan Stephenson (born 26 September 1944) is an English former professional footballer, who played as a defender. He made a total of 386 appearances in the Football league for Crystal Palace, West Ham United, Fulham and Portsmouth. At the end of his career, he played for Durban United in South Africa.

== Playing career ==
Starting as an amateur footballer aged sixteen, Stephenson signed professional terms on 15 February 1962 and made his senior debut for Crystal Palace as a seventeen-year-old on 24 March 1962. Dominating in the air and solid in defence he made a major contribution towards Palace's climb up, and promotion from, the Third Division. He was appointed as captain by manager Dick Graham and from 1964, rarely missed a game playing alongside Brian Wood. Stephenson was sold to West Ham in 1968 for a club record fee of £80,000. He made his first appearance for West Ham on 16 March 1968 in a 0–0 away draw with Southampton. Joining a team which contained World Cup winning heroes Martin Peters, Geoff Hurst and Bobby Moore, he made over 100 appearances for West Ham, most of them alongside Moore. Stephenson failed to solve the defensive problems which had existed since the departure of Ken Brown in 1965 and, following a loan spell for Fulham in season 1971–72, he was transferred for £32,000 to Portsmouth for whom he made 98 appearances until 1975. In 1975, Stephenson moved to South Africa, playing for Durban United before returning in 1977 to coach at Orient. He coached their reserve team but after four years with Orient, quit football to run a pub in Colchester and to work as an education and welfare officer with Essex County Council.

== International career ==
Stephenson made seven appearances for the England Under-23 team. He also played two games for an FA team which played games in Australia in 1971. In both games, in June 1971, the FA team won 1–0.
