= Billy Houghton =

English footballer

Personal information
- Full name: Billy Gascoigne Houghton
- Date of birth: 20 February 1939 (age 87)
- Place of birth: Hemsworth, England
- Position: Defender

Senior career*
Years	Team	Apps	(Gls)
1957–1964	Barnsley	206	(10)
1964–1966	Watford	48	(2)
1966–1969	Ipswich Town	107	(3)
1969–1970	Leicester City	7	(0)
1970–????	Rotherham United	139	(1)
- * Club domestic league appearances and goals

Billy Houghton (born 20 February 1939) is an English former professional footballer. During his career he made over 200 appearances for Barnsley, 139 appearances for Rotherham United, over 100 appearances Ipswich Town and 51 appearances for Watford.Started out at Barnsley as a part-time professional having a job in the building trade.
