= Gerry Priestley =

English footballer (1931–2020)

Personal information
- Full name: Gerald Priestley
- Date of birth: 2 March 1931
- Place of birth: Halifax, England
- Date of death: 21 January 2020 (aged 88)
- Position: Winger

Senior career*
Years	Team	Apps	(Gls)
1950–1953	Nottingham Forest	0	(0)
1953–1955	Exeter City	42	(6)
1955–1958	Grimsby Town	110	(11)
1958–1960	Crystal Palace	28	(2)
1960–1963	Halifax Town	105	(23)
- * Club domestic league appearances and goals

Gerald Priestley (2 March 1931 - 21 January 2020) was a former footballer who played as a winger in the Football League in the 1950s and 1960s. He was born in Halifax.

He started with Nottingham Forest but did not play any League games for them and moved to Exeter City in 1953, before transferring to Grimsby Town. He made over 100 League appearances for Grimsby, before moving to Crystal Palace in 1958.

He was at Palace for two years, and during his time there scored two senior goals for them.

He subsequently transferred to Halifax Town, with whom he made another 105 League appearances.

Gerry died 21 January 2020.
