= Eric Jones (footballer, born 1931) =

English footballer

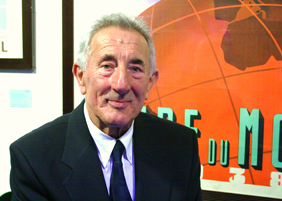
- Jones at the National Football Museum in October 2009

Personal information
- Date of birth: 23 June 1931 (age 95)
- Place of birth: Ulverston, England
- Position: Winger

Youth career
- Notts County

Senior career*
Years	Team	Apps	(Gls)
1953–1955	Preston North End	13	(0)
1955–1957	Nottingham Forest	18	(3)
1957–1959	Doncaster Rovers	15	(2)
1959–1960	Accrington Stanley	18	(0)
1960–1962	Southport	76	(18)
1962–1963	Lancaster City		
- * Club domestic league appearances and goals

Eric Jones (born 23 June 1931 in Ulverston) is an English former football player, who played for Preston North End, Nottingham Forest, Doncaster Rovers, Accrington Stanley, Southport and Lancaster City in the 1950s and early 1960s.

Jones nearly signed for Blackburn Rovers, but he had to do National Service in the RAF. Following the completion of his National Service, Jones signed for Preston North End. Eric was born in Ulverston, but was brought up in Preston and was a keen PNE supporter. Eric was an understudy to Tom Finney. Playing in the same position as Finney, a regular England international, meant that Eric found it extremely difficult to get regular first team appearances. Jones was unlucky not to play in the 1954 FA Cup Final, which Finney played in despite not being fully fit. Jones had deputised for Tom Finney against West Bromwich Albion only three weeks before at The Hawthorns and in his own words "had played well". In fact Eric says that after the game Len Millard came up to him and said "Good match son, I can see who has been training you", referring to the fact that he was playing on the right wing with a left foot, similar to Finney.

Jones was friendly with Peter Higham and he followed him to Nottingham Forest. Jones went on to play for Doncaster Rovers, Accrington Stanley, Southport and Lancaster City in the remainder of his career.
