= Tommy Millar =

Scottish footballer (1938–2001)

Personal information
- Full name: Thomas Thomson Millar
- Date of birth: 3 December 1938
- Place of birth: Edinburgh, Scotland
- Date of death: 29 July 2001 (aged 62)
- Place of death: Edinburgh, Scotland
- Position: Right back

Senior career*
Years	Team	Apps	(Gls)
1959–1962	Colchester United	46	(4)
1962–1969	Dundee United	209	(7)
1967	→ Dallas Tornado (loan)	10	(0)
1969–1970	Cowdenbeath	28	(1)
1970–1971	Berwick Rangers	10	(0)
1971–1972	Hamilton Academical	4	(0)
Total		307	(12)
- * Club domestic league appearances and goals

Tommy Millar (3 December 1938 – 29 July 2001) was a Scottish professional footballer, who played as a right back.

== Career ==
Millar signed professional forms with Colchester United in 1959 and went on to play nearly fifty league games before leaving in 1961 to join Dundee United. Millar spent eight years at Tannadice and was joined by his brother Jimmy for the final two years, the forward signing from Rangers. After over 200 league matches for The Terrors, Millar moved to Cowdenbeath, where his single season preceded similar spells at Berwick Rangers and finally Hamilton Academical. Upon retiring in 1971, Millar had played in just under 300 senior league matches, scoring twelve times.

Millar died in 2001.

== Honours ==
=== Club ===
Colchester United

- Football League Fourth Division Runner-up (1): 1961–62

Cowdenbeath

- Scottish Second Division Runner-up (1): 1969–70
