= Johnny Key (footballer) =

English footballer

Personal information
- Date of birth: 5 November 1937 (age 88)
- Place of birth: Kensington, London, England
- Positions: Half back; winger

Senior career*
| Years | Team | Apps | (Gls) |
| 1958–1966 | Fulham | 163 | (29) |
| 1966–1968 | Coventry City | 28 | (7) |
| 1967–1969 | Leyton Orient | 10 | (0) |
- * Club domestic league appearances and goals

John Key (born 5 November 1937) is an English former professional footballer who played as a half back or winger. He started his career as a junior at Fulham and played professionally for the club between 1958 and 1966, playing 163 league matches and scoring 29 goals. He made 181 appearances in all competitions for Fulham, scoring 37 goals. He moved to Coventry City in 1966, where he played 28 matches and scored 7 goals in two seasons. He ended his career in 1969 after a two-year spell at Leyton Orient, which saw him play just 10 matches.
