= Cecil Allan =

Northern Irish footballer

Personal information
- Full name: Cecil A. Allan
- Date of birth: 1 August 1914
- Place of birth: Belfast, Northern Ireland
- Date of death: 11 May 2003 (aged 88)
- Place of death: Colchester, England
- Height: 1.75 m (5 ft 9 in)
- Position: Full-back

Senior career*
Years	Team	Apps	(Gls)
- Linfield
1934–1936	Cliftonville		
1936–1938	Chelsea	0	(0)
1938–1946	Colchester United	16	(0)
- Colchester Casuals
Total		16+	(0+)

International career
1935	Northern Ireland Amateurs	1	(0)
1935	Irish League XI	2	(0)
1935	Ireland	1	(0)
- * Club domestic league appearances and goals

Cecil A. Allan (1 August 1914 – 11 May 2003) was a Northern Irish footballer who made one appearance for Ireland in 1935. He played as a full-back in the Irish Football League for Linfield and Cliftonville, earning a move to Chelsea in the Football League, but failed to make an appearance. He joined Colchester United in the Southern League, but his career was interrupted by injury and World War II.

== Early life ==
Born in Belfast, Allan was the youngest of nine brothers. His mother died when he was four-years-old and his father, who had worked on the RMS Titanic, was killed as an innocent passer-by in a gun battle between the IRA and the Black and Tans.

== Club career ==
Allan began his career at Linfield, playing for the reserve team known as Linfield Swifts. He moved to Cliftonville where he featured in the first-team whilst following in his father's footsteps, working at Harland and Wolff. In the 1935–36 season, he featured in two Inter-League matches, a 2–1 win over The Football League and a 3–2 loss to the Scottish Football League.

Allan joined Chelsea in 1936, but damaged his cartilage on his debut for the reserve team, never making a first-team appearance for the club. He was signed by Colchester United in 1938 for £2,000, making 16 appearances in all competitions spanning from 1938 to 1945. During the war years, Allan made guest appearances for Dundela, Bangor and Crewe Alexandra. He left the U's to help run Colchester Casuals in 1949.

== International career ==
Allan made his full international debut for Ireland on 19 October 1935 at the age of 21. The match was held at Windsor Park as England defeated Ireland 3–1. He also represented Northern Ireland at amateur level and the Irish League.

== Later life ==
Following the war, Allan settled in the Colchester area, marrying a local woman and returned to work in the metal industry. He managed the works football team and was also a pianist for the works dance band. Alongside fellow former Colchester United player George Leslie, Allan ran local club Colchester Casuals. He made an appearance at Layer Road in the early 2000s as, at the time, the oldest surviving U's player. Cecil Allan died at the age of 88 on 11 May 2003.
