= Edgar Rumney =

English footballer

Personal information
- Full name: Joseph Edgar Rumney
- Date of birth: 15 September 1936
- Place of birth: Abberton, England
- Date of death: 18 August 2015 (aged 78)
- Position: Full back

Youth career
- Colchester United

Senior career*
| Years | Team | Apps | (Gls) |
| 1957–1964 | Colchester United | 49 | (0) |
- Sudbury Town
- * Club domestic league appearances and goals

Edgar Rumney (15 September 1936 – 18 August 2015) was an English professional footballer who played for Colchester United.

== Biography ==
Born in Abberton in Essex, Rumney signed for Colchester in 1957, having been an apprentice at the club. A full back, he made his debut against QPR on 2 September 1957, and went on to make 49 appearances for the club, before leaving to join Sudbury Town as player-coach in 1964. After retiring from playing football he became involved with Abberton & District Cricket Club, going on to become the club's record holder for number of appearances (1,627) and wickets taken (1,831), as well as serving as club captain and president.
