= Ray Tinkler =

English football referee (born 1929)

Raymond Tinkler
- Born: 1929 (age 96–97); Boston, Lincolnshire, England
- Occupation: Football referee
- Years active: 1960–1976

Raymond Tinkler (born 1929) is an English football referee who served on the Football League list from 1961 to 1976. Outside football he was a company secretary.

== Career ==
On leaving school, Tinkler worked for E W Bowser and was company secretary for over forty years.

Ray was on the Football League Referees' list from 1960 to 1976. He was a linesman at Wembley for the 1962 FA Cup final between Tottenham Hotspur and Burnley and refereed the amateur cup final in 1971.

Outside the United Kingdom Ray refereed matches at Prague, Ajax in the Netherlands, Kaiserlautern, Barcelona, Milan, Genoa (Sampdoria), Florence (Fiorentina) and Rome (Lazio).

During a game between Leeds United and West Bromwich Albion at Elland Road on 17 April 1971, Tinkler allowed play to continue after a linesman had flagged for offside. The Leeds players stopped when they saw the flag and West Brom went on to score. The decision to play on caused outrage at the time. He was surrounded by Leeds players, and several Leeds fans who invaded the pitch were escorted off by police. Leeds pulled a goal back but lost the game 1–2. In 2000, Tinkler was still adamant that the player was in his own half.

Tinkler's final match was a game between Oldham and West Bromwich Albion at Boundary Park on 24 April 1976 where the away team won 1–0 to clinch promotion to Division 1. He later became Chairman of the Football Association Referees' Committee and The Referees' Association.

In 1998, he received a gold medal from the FA for fifty years' service.

In 2005, Tinkler became chairman of Lincolnshire FA having been on the committee for over 30 years. He retired from the role of chairman in the summer of 2010.
