= Keith Rutter =

English footballer (1931–2021)

Personal information
- Date of birth: 10 September 1931
- Place of birth: Leeds, England
- Date of death: 24 June 2021 (aged 89)
- Place of death: Axminster, Devon, England
- Position: Centre half

Senior career*
Years	Team	Apps	(Gls)
- Methley United
1954–1962	Queens Park Rangers	339	(1)
1962–1964	Colchester United	63	(0)
1964–1965	Romford	19	(0)
1965–1966	Ashford Town	46	(0)
- Hastings United
- * Club domestic league appearances and goals

Keith Gregg Rutter (10 September 1931 – 24 June 2021) was an English professional footballer who made 402 appearances in the Football League playing as a centre half for Queens Park Rangers and Colchester United.

Rutter was born in Leeds on 10 September 1931. He was a reliable defender, who made his QPR debut in August 1954 against Southend United and went on to play 339 league games, scoring 1 goal. He was ever present for three seasons.

He went on to play non-league football with Romford and Ashford Town (where he was a league ever-present in the 1965–1966 season), before ending his career as player-manager of Hastings United.

Rutter died on 24 June 2021, at the age of 89.
