= Colin Lundstrum =

English footballer

Personal information
- Full name: Colin Francis Lundstrum
- Date of birth: 9 October 1938 (age 88)
- Place of birth: Colchester, England
- Position: Winger

Youth career
- West Ham United

Senior career*
Years	Team	Apps	(Gls)
?-1956	Colchester Casuals		
1956–1961	Ipswich Town	13	(1)
1961–1962	Colchester United	1	(0)
- Clacton Town
Total		14	(1)
- * Club domestic league appearances and goals

Colin Francis Lundstrum (born 9 October 1938) is an English former footballer who played in the Football League as a winger for Ipswich Town and Colchester United.

== Career ==
Born in Colchester, Lundstrum began his career with West Ham United as an amateur, but failed to progress to the club's first team, returning to his hometown and playing for Colchester Casuals. He then signed for Ipswich Town in November 1956 and made his Football League debut in a Second Division 0–0 draw with Swansea Town on 15 February 1958.

Lundstrum made 13 league appearances for Town and scored one goal, making his final appearance in a 4–1 away win over Brighton & Hove Albion on 28 December 1959.

Colchester United signed Lundstrum in August 1961 from Ipswich but only made a single appearance for the club during a 4–0 away defeat to Mansfield Town on 15 January 1962.

Upon his release from Colchester, Lundstrum joined non-league Clacton Town. He retired from the game after his stay at Clacton.
