= Mike Beesley =

English footballer

Personal information
- Full name: Michael Beesley
- Date of birth: 10 June 1942 (age 84)
- Place of birth: High Beach, Epping Forest, England
- Height: 5 ft 10 in (1.78 m)
- Position: Inside forward

Youth career
- 1958–1960: West Ham United

Senior career*
Years	Team	Apps	(Gls)
1960–1962	West Ham United	2	(1)
1962–1965	Southend United	79	(34)
1965–1967	Peterborough United	25	(3)
1967–1971	Southend United	133	(11)
1971	Dover	?	(?)
Total		239	(49)
- * Club domestic league appearances and goals

Michael Beesley (born 10 June 1942) is an English former professional footballer who played as an inside forward. Beesley's professional career, which lasted from 1960 to 1971, saw him play for three different teams in the Football League, making a total of nearly 250 appearances.

== Career ==
Born in Epping Forest, Beesley began his career with the youth team of West Ham United, playing in the 1958–59 FA Youth Cup. Beesley played in the Football League for West Ham United, Southend United and Peterborough United between 1960 and 1971, scoring 40 goals in 239 games. Beesley later played non-league football with Dover.
