= Martyn King =

English footballer (1937–2019)

Personal information
- Full name: Martyn Noel Geoffrey King
- Date of birth: 23 August 1937
- Place of birth: Birmingham, England
- Date of death: 25 December 2019 (aged 82)
- Position: Forward

Senior career*
Years	Team	Apps	(Gls)
1956–1964	Colchester United	212	(130)
1964–1966	Wrexham	45	(15)
- * Club domestic league appearances and goals as of 19:45, 28 March 2012 (UTC)

Martyn Noel Geoffrey King (23 August 1937 – 25 December 2019) was an English professional footballer who played as a forward.

== Career ==
King signed for Colchester United from local side Pegasus in 1956, but it was not until 1959, when he was on the verge of completing National Service that he was available for every game. He responded by equalling Kevin McCurley's 30 League goals in a season club record including a trio of hat tricks. In total, he notched six hat-tricks in U's colours.

On 30 December 1961, after a 4–1 Boxing Day defeat at Bradford City, United set their club record victory in the return fixture, with both King and his strike partner Bobby Hunt scoring four goals each as the Colchester ran out 9–1 winners. He was a member of Colchester's outstanding 1961–62 promotion-winning team, which was also the highest-scoring team in the U's history, as Colchester hit the net 104 times in 44 league games and King struck up a prolific understanding with Hunt. The pair scored nearly 200 goals between them in under four seasons, before Hunt moved to Northampton Town in 1964.

In 1964, King was sold to Wrexham by Colchester manager Neil Franklin, where he scored 15 goals in 45 league appearances.

King holds the Colchester United record for most league goals (130 between 1959 and 1965) and jointly holds the record for most goals scored in a match (4 - shared with Bobby Hunt and Chris Iwelumo). He also jointly holds the record for most hat-tricks scored (5 - shared with Arthur Pritchard, Arthur Turner and Tony Adcock).

== After football ==
King taught Mathematics at his old school, Earls Colne Grammar School until it closed in 1975. He then moved to teach at Ramsey School, Halstead. In December 2008, King was due to be Colchester's guest for a game with Scunthorpe United, but a ruptured aortic aneurysm left him seriously ill with severe bleeding to his stomach. He was later allowed home to begin his path back to full health.

King died on 25 December 2019, aged 82.

== Honours ==
=== Club ===
Colchester United

- Football League Fourth Division Runner-up (1): 1961–62
