= Tony Howe =

English footballer

Personal information
- Full name: Anthony Valentine Howe
- Date of birth: 14 February 1939 (age 87)
- Place of birth: Colchester, England
- Position: Winger

Senior career*
| Years | Team | Apps | (Gls) |
| ?–1960 | Colchester Casuals | ? | (?) |
| 1960 | Colchester United | 10 | (2) |
| 1961–1964 | Haverhill Rovers | ? | (?) |
| 1964–1965 | Southend United | 2 | (0) |
| 1965–? | Clacton Town | ? | (?) |
- * Club domestic league appearances and goals as of 17:59, 13 May 2011

Anthony Valentine Howe (born 14 February 1939) is an English former professional footballer who played as a winger for Football League clubs Colchester United and Essex rivals Southend United.
