= David Coleman (footballer, born 1942) =

English footballer

Personal information
- Full name: David John Coleman
- Date of birth: 27 March 1942
- Place of birth: Colchester, England
- Date of death: 23 September 2016 (aged 74)
- Position: Forward

Senior career*
Years	Team	Apps	(Gls)
- Stanway Rovers
- Harwich & Parkeston
1958–1961	Colchester Casuals		
1961–1962	Colchester United	2	(1)
- Clacton Town
Total		2	(1)
- * Club domestic league appearances and goals

David John Coleman (27 March 1942 – 23 September 2016) was an English footballer who played in the Football League as a forward for Colchester United.

== Career ==
Born in Colchester in 1942, Coleman began his career with local clubs Stanway Rovers and Harwich & Parkeston in non-league football before moving into the Football League with hometown club Colchester United.

Coleman made his debut on 18 November 1961 in a Fourth Division away tie at Rochdale, a game which the U's won 1–0. He only made one more Football League appearance for Colchester, which came the following season on 20 October in a 4–1 defeat away to Wrexham, with Coleman scoring the solitary goal for Colchester.

After leaving Colchester, Coleman joined another local non-league club, Clacton Town.

Coleman died on 23 September 2016 from cancer.
