= Billy Stark (footballer, born 1937) =

Scottish footballer

Personal information
- Full name: William Reid Stark
- Date of birth: 27 May 1937 (age 89)
- Place of birth: Glasgow, Scotland
- Position: Forward

Senior career*
Years	Team	Apps	(Gls)
1958–1960	Rangers	0	(0)
1960–1961	Crewe Alexandra	39	(13)
1961–1962	Carlisle United	35	(17)
1962–1965	Colchester United	95	(33)
1965–1966	Luton Town	10	(4)
1966–1967	Chesterfield	31	(15)
1967–1968	Newport County	12	(2)
1968–1969	Matlock Town	?	(?)
1969–1970	Boston United	4	(1)
- * Club domestic league appearances and goals as of 00:30, 17 May 2011

William Reid Stark (born 27 May 1937 in Glasgow, Scotland) is a Scottish former professional footballer who played as a forward. He played in Football League most notably for Colchester United, making 95 league appearances, and he also made appearances for Crewe Alexandra, Carlisle United, Luton Town, Chesterfield and Newport County.
