= George Ramage =

Scottish footballer

Personal information
- Full name: George McIntosh Ramage
- Date of birth: 29 January 1937 (age 89)
- Place of birth: Newtongrange, Scotland
- Position: Goalkeeper

Youth career
- Easthouses Lily

Senior career*
Years	Team	Apps	(Gls)
1957–1961	Third Lanark	38	(0)
1961–1964	Colchester United	38	(0)
1964–1965	Leyton Orient	4	(0)
1965–1966	Luton Town	7	(0)
1966	St. George		
1967	South Coast United		

Managerial career
- 1974: Balgownie Rangers
- * Club domestic league appearances and goals

George McIntosh Ramage (born 29 January 1937 in Newtongrange) is a Scottish former footballer.
