= Mike Grice =

English footballer

Personal information
- Full name: Michael John Grice
- Date of birth: 3 November 1931
- Place of birth: Woking, England
- Date of death: August 2002 (aged 70)
- Position: Winger

Senior career*
| Years | Team | Apps | (Gls) |
| ?–1952 | Lowestoft Town | | |
| 1952–1955 | Colchester United | 106 | (14) |
| 1955–1961 | West Ham United | 142 | (18) |
| 1961–1962 | Coventry City | 37 | (6) |
| 1962–1966 | Colchester United | 139 | (13) |
| 1966–? | Lowestoft Town | | |
- * Club domestic league appearances and goals

Michael John Grice (3 November 1931 – August 2002) was an English footballer who played as a winger.

== Career ==
Born in Woking, Surrey, Grice began his career at Lowestoft Town before signing for Colchester United in 1952. He was selected to play for the Third Division South representative side in 1954–55.

He joined West Ham United for £10,000 in 1955 and was a part of West Ham's promotion winning side of 1957–58.

Grice joined Coventry City for the 1961–62 season. He made 38 Third Division appearances, scoring six goals, before moving back to Colchester the following year. He later returned to Lowestoft Town of the Eastern Counties League alongside former Hammer Albert Foan.

== Honours ==
=== Club ===
West Ham United

- Football League Second Division Winner (1): 1957–58
