= Mike Foster (footballer) =

English footballer

Personal information
- Full name: Michael Sydney Foster
- Date of birth: 3 February 1939 (age 87)
- Place of birth: Leicester, England
- Position: Winger

Youth career
- Leicester City

Senior career*
Years	Team	Apps	(Gls)
	Leicester City	0	(0)
1961–1962	Colchester United	36	(8)
1962–1963	Norwich City	0	(0)
1963–1964	Millwall	13	(2)
Total		49	(10)
- * Club domestic league appearances and goals

Michael Sydney Foster (born 3 February 1939) is an English former footballer who played as a winger in the Football League for Colchester United and Millwall. He was also signed to Leicester City and Norwich City, though he made no appearances for those clubs.

== Career ==
Born in Leicester, Foster came through the ranks at hometown club Leicester City, but was never selected for the first team. He transferred to Colchester United nominally in 1961, making his professional debut on the opening day of the 1961–62 season in a 3–0 victory over Stockport County at Layer Road. He scored his first goal for the club on 26 August during a 2–2 draw away at Oldham Athletic.

During his single season with the U's, Foster made 36 league appearances, scoring eight goals and assisted Colchester to promotion to the Third Division. His final goal for the club came on 23 March 1962, the opening goal of a 2–0 victory against Mansfield Town. He made his final Colchester appearance on the final day of the season, a 5–3 home victory over Doncaster Rovers.

Foster left Colchester for Norwich City for £3,000 in the summer of 1962 in a deal that also saw Roy McCrohan head to the U's. He failed to break into the first-team at Norwich and did not make any appearances for the club. He later joined Millwall in the 1963–64 season, making 13 appearances and scoring two goals. He left the professional game after leaving Millwall.

== Honours ==
Colchester United

- 1961–62 Fourth Division runner-up (Level 4)

All honours referenced by:
