= Michael John Foster (scoutmaster) =

Michael John Foster (born 12 January 1952) is an English priest, youth leader and an historian of scouting and other youth organisations. He was Grand Scoutmaster of the Order of World Scouts and Grand Scoutmaster and formerly the Chief Commissioner of the British Boy Scouts and British Girl Scouts. He is an ordained Anglican priest and, until 2020 when he retired, was a parish priest.

== Early Scouting career ==
He became a Wolf Cub in 1960, with a scout group registered with The Boy Scouts Association and was then a Boy Scout registered with the same association in 1967 but left in 1971 owing to the sweeping changes of the Advance Party Report introduced within the Scout Association.

== Career in the Order of World Scouts ==
In 1977, whilst at Oxford reading theology at St Stephen's House, Oxford, he re-founded the "St Stephen's House Rover Crew" as an independent venture, with the blessing of the then principal, David Hope). In 1979, he discovered that the British Boy Scouts (BBS) still existed as a single Troop in Lewisham. A former principal of St Stephen's House had been the chaplain to the Lewisham Troop of the BBS. Travelling to Lewisham during the 1979 Easter recess, he sought out Charles Brown, the BBS Chief Commissioner and Grand Scoutmaster. The Rover Crew at St Stephen's House by then had been registered with the university authorities as the Oxford University Rover Crew and was admitted as an affiliated group to the BBS. He was made Commissioner for Oxfordshire. In 1983, when he was the Vicar of Holy Trinity, Nottingham and leader of its BBS troop, he was appointed as Chief Commissioner of the BBS by Charles Brown. In 2000, the then Grand Scoutmaster, Ted Scott, who had joined the BBS and OWS in 1926, asked him if he would become Grand Scoutmaster, allowing Scott to retire. In more than forty years of service to scouting, he was instrumental in the expansion of the BBS and OWS, inspiring the formation of scout organisations internationally and helping to re-establish understanding of scouting as a movement rather than an organisation. In 2017, he retired as Grand Scoutmaster and, in 2020, he resigned from the BBS.

== In succession to Sir Francis Vane ==
Michael Foster was the seventh Grandscoutmaster in succession to Sir Francis Vane.

Name	Termination of Tenure
Sir Francis Vane, bt 1911-1912	Resigned.
Albert Jones Knighton 1913-1926	Resigned
Rt Hon Lord Alington 1926-1932	Resigned
Samuel Nalty Manning 1932-1967	Died in Office
Percy Herbert Pooley 1967-1971	Died in Office
Charles A Brown 1971-1992	Died in Office
Edward E Scott 1993-2000	Retired as Emeritus, died in Office 2009.
Rev'd Michael John Foster 2000	Retired 2017
David Cooksley 2017	Current

== Scout historian and academic ==
Dr Foster is acknowledged as a Scout historian. He was the first person to track down the origins of the name "Boy Scout" as beginning in the UK in the Aldine Press - first in the New Buffalow Bill Library, 1899, and then the True Blue War Library 1900–1906. He has supplied the article "Boy Scouts" for the Encyclopedia of Children and Childhood, 2004.

Other contributions have been to the following books and Articles:

- The Biography on Baden-Powell by the Author Tim Jeal.
- The periodical 'Action Scout' ISO Press Westminster, 1988–1992.
- The Italian Book on Sir Francis Vane by Alberto dal Porto.
- Sir Francis Vane, fifth baronet of Hutton by Roger T. Stearn - Article in the periodical 'Soldiers of the Queen'.
- The other Scouts, by Tom Wood - Article in the periodical 'Practical Family History'
- Paul Kua's Book on Scouting in Hong Kong 1910-2010

He has been involved in other areas of research; In 1978 he was a Philip Usher Memorial Scholar, and undertook research on "The Culturalization of the Greek Orthodox Church in Great Britain", and has undertaken a research degree in Psychology, and is a Fellow of the Royal Society of Medicine, and a Member of the Chartered Institute of Journalists.
