= John Brown (footballer, born March 1940) =

Scottish footballer

Personal information
- Full name: John Brown
- Date of birth: 6 March 1940 (age 86)
- Place of birth: Edinburgh, Scotland
- Position: Wing half

Senior career*
Years	Team	Apps	(Gls)
- Dunbar United
1962	Colchester United	1	(0)
- Stenhousemuir
- George Cross
Total		1	(0)
- * Club domestic league appearances and goals

John Brown (born 6 March 1940) is a Scottish former footballer who played as a wing half in the Football League for Colchester United.

== Career ==
Born in Edinburgh, Brown began his career with the Scottish junior club Dunbar United. He earned a move to English Football League side Colchester United in 1962 where he made one league appearance for the U's. He made his debut for Colchester in the League Cup during a 2–0 second round defeat at Northampton Town on 26 September 1962. Following this came his league debut and solitary appearance at Layer Road, a 1–1 draw with Halifax Town on 27 October, and his final appearance came in the subsequent game, an FA Cup tie with non-league Wimbledon in the first round that ended in a 2–1 defeat.

After leaving Colchester, Brown returned to Scotland to play for Stenhousemuir, and later moved to Australia to play for George Cross.
