= Mick Loughton =

English footballer and manager (born 1942)

Personal information
- Full name: Michael George Loughton
- Date of birth: 8 December 1942 (age 83)
- Place of birth: Colchester, England
- Position: Defender

Youth career
- Wilson Marriage
- 1958–1961: Colchester United

Senior career*
Years	Team	Apps	(Gls)
- Eastern Gas
- Colchester Casuals
1961–1968	Colchester United	122	(7)
1968–1970	Brentwood Town		
1970–1978	Chelmsford City		

Managerial career
- 1977–1978: Chelmsford City
- Tiptree United
- 1981–1984: Chelmsford City
- 1985–1986: Wivenhoe Town
- 1991–1993: Wivenhoe Town
- * Club domestic league appearances and goals

Michael George Loughton (born 8 December 1942) is an English former professional footballer who played in The Football League as a defender.

== Club career ==
Born in Colchester, Loughton appeared for local-Colchester based feeder clubs Eastern Gas and Colchester Casuals, before signing professional forms with hometown club Colchester United in August 1961, after being signed to Colchester United by manager Benny Fenton upon leaving school in July 1958. On 7 November 1964, Loughton made his Football League debut for Colchester, in a 6–3 Essex derby loss against rivals Southend United. On 26 March 1965, Loughton scored his first goal for the club, in a 2–1 victory away to Barnsley. In total, Loughton scored seven goals in 133 games in all competitions for Colchester. Loughton predominantly played as a part-time professional for the club, only playing as a full-time professional a select few seasons in his ten years on the books at Layer Road.

In 1968, Loughton signed for Brentwood Town, signing a part-time contract. Due to his father's ailing health, Loughton decided to drop into Non-League football in order to support the family business more. Two years later, Loughton moved to Chelmsford City, after a merger between Brentwood and Chelmsford. Loughton, partnering former Brentwood teammate Brian Snowdon in the centre of defence, did not experience defeat with Chelmsford until his 14th game at the time, helping the club finish fifth in the 1970–71 Southern League season, playing in 49 of Chelmsford's 53 games that season. The following season, pairing Paul Delea in Chelmsford's defence, Loughton appeared in 59 of Chelmsford's 62 games as the club won the Southern League. During the 1972–73 season, Loughton missed just three of Chelmsford's 68 games in all competitions, as the club finished fourth in the Southern League, meeting Ipswich Town in the third round of the FA Cup. In 1978, Loughton retired from football, finishing his Chelmsford career with 383 appearances and 29 goals in all competitions.

== Managerial career ==
In July 1977, whilst still a player at Chelmsford, Loughton was appointed manager of the club, before leaving in May 1978. After a spell as manager for Tiptree United, Loughton returned to Chelmsford in October 1981, managing the club for just over three years in his second spell, before departing in December 1984. In total, Loughton managed 283 games for Chelmsford, winning 133, drawing 70 and losing 80, placing him in third place, behind Harry Ferrier and Joe O'Sullivan, of managers who have managed Chelmsford for the most games. Towards the end of his managerial career, Loughton also had two spells at Wivenhoe Town.

Following his managerial career, Loughton worked as a scout, primarily under John Still.
