= Ron Hunt (footballer, born 1933) =

English footballer (1933–1999)

Personal information
- Full name: Ronald Malcolm Hunt
- Date of birth: 26 September 1933
- Place of birth: Colchester, England
- Date of death: April 1999 (aged 65)
- Position: Wing half

Senior career*
Years	Team	Apps	(Gls)
1952–1963	Colchester United	177	(3)

Managerial career
- Mersea Island
- * Club domestic league appearances and goals as of 18:13, 13 May 2011

Ronald Malcolm Hunt (26 September 1933 – April 1999) born in Colchester, England, was an English professional footballer who played as a wing half in the Football League.

== Career ==
Hunt played for Colchester United his entire career, making over 150 appearances for the club. He helped the team to promotion to the Third Division in 1962 before retiring through injury in 1963. Following his retirement, Hunt managed local non-league club Mersea Island.

== Honours ==
=== Club ===
Colchester United

- Football League Fourth Division Runner-up (1): 1961–62
