= Colchester Casuals F.C. =

English football club

Colchester Casuals Football Club
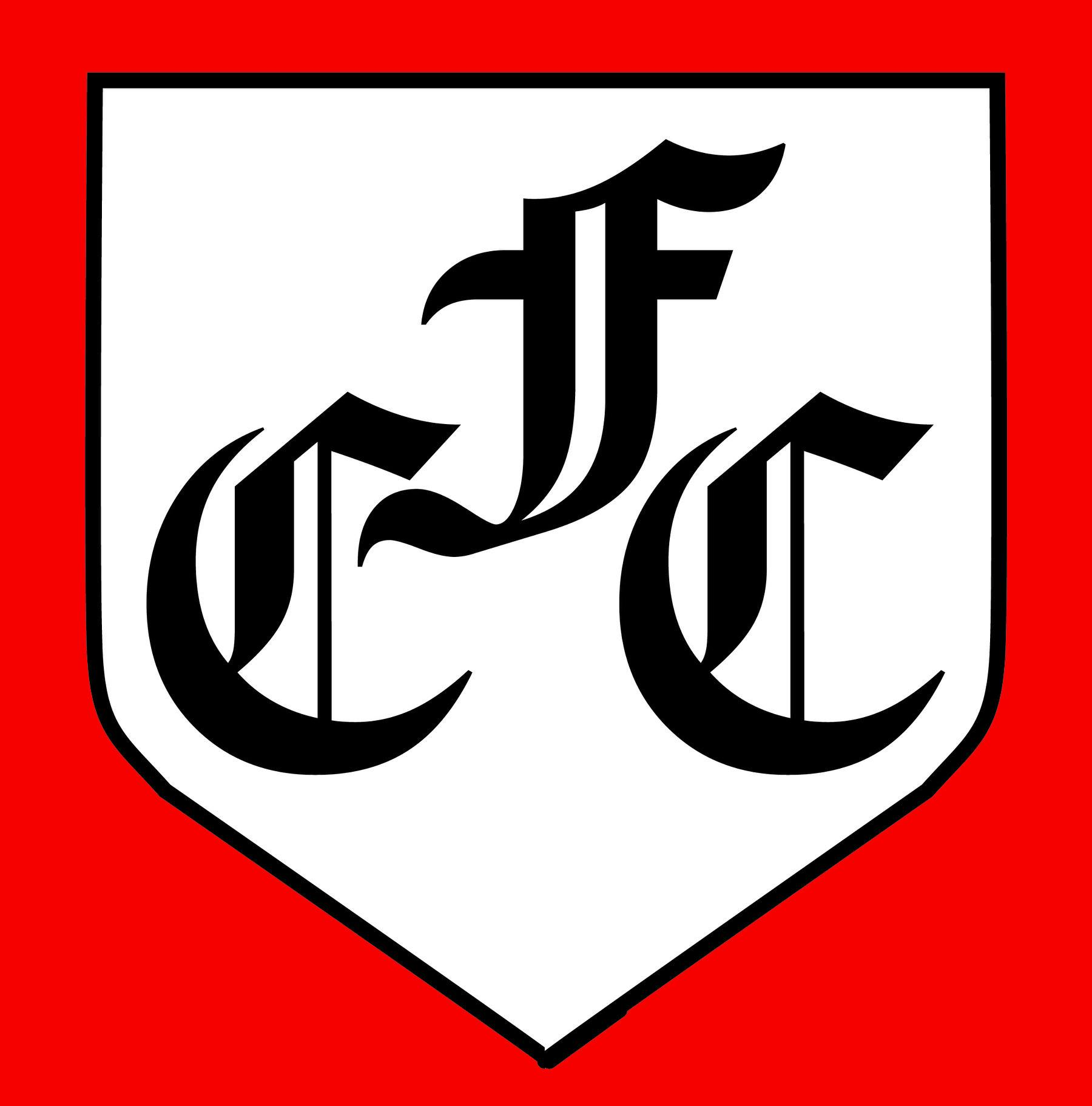
- Full name: Colchester Casuals Football Club
- Nickname(s): The Casuals
- Founded: 1883
- Dissolved: 1970
- Ground: Old Heath Recreation Ground, Colchester, then later Braiswick and also King Harold Road
- Chairman: Fred Taylor (1946-1950)
- League: Essex and Suffolk Border Football League

Colchester Casuals Football Club was an amateur football club based in Colchester, England.

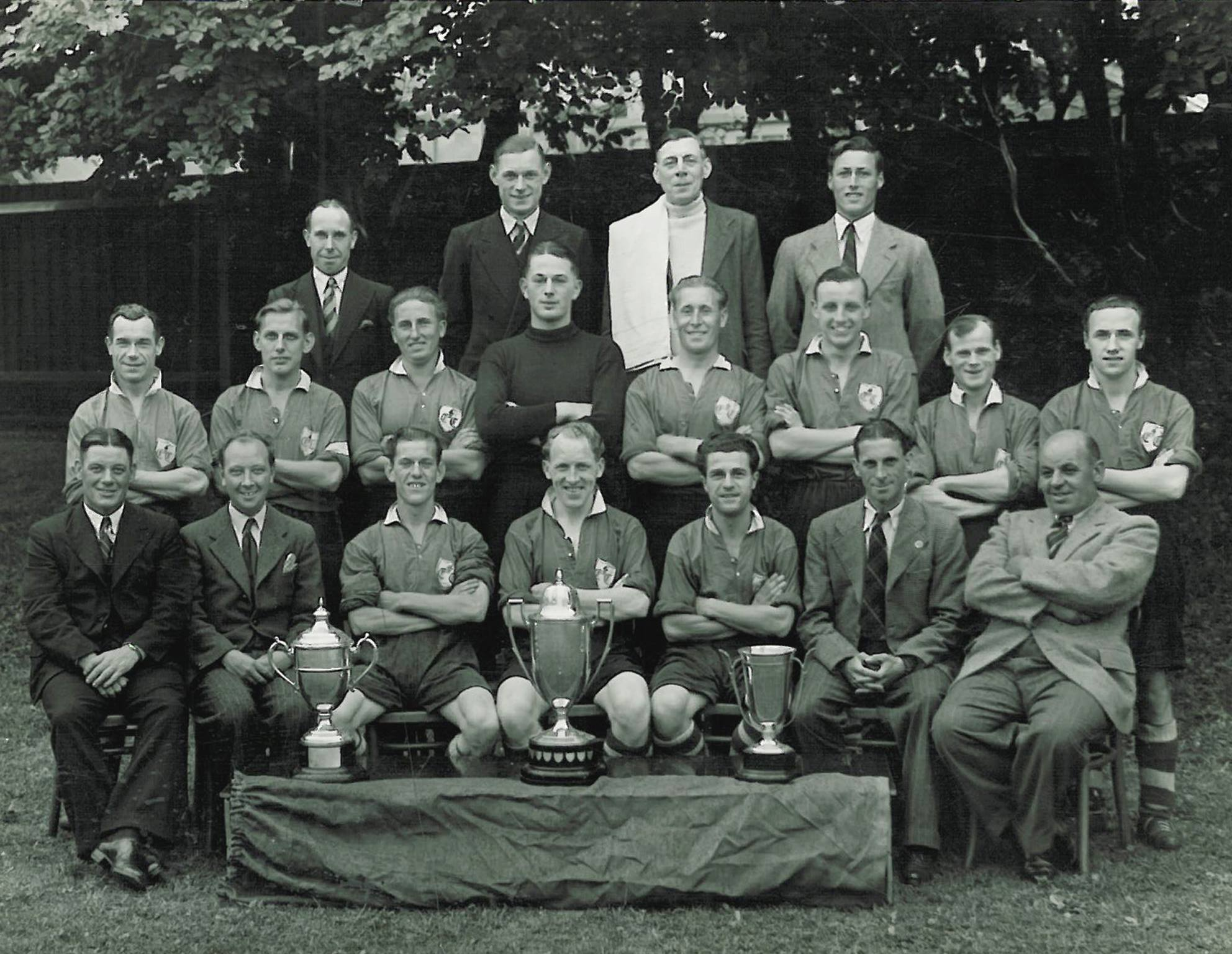
Colchester Casuals during the 1946–47 season.

== History ==
Colchester Casuals Football Club history can be traced back to 1883, when the Casuals first appeared in Colchester football records. Colchester Casuals mainly operated as a feeder club for Colchester United.

The 1946–1947 season was their most successful ever when they were winners of the Essex and Suffolk Border League. the British Legion Cup, the Essex and Suffolk Border League Cup and were runners-up in the Clacton Hospital Cup. In 1948, Colchester Casuals entered the FA Cup for the first time, losing 3–2 away to Dagenham British Legion in the extra preliminary round. The following season, the club reached the preliminary round, after beating Saffron Walden Town 3–2, before exiting to the hands of Grays Athletic. During the 1950s, the club also entered the FA Amateur Cup.

The team at this time contained an array of talent including a young Vic Keeble who went on to play for Newcastle United and they were captained by former Chelsea and Northern Ireland player Cecil Allan.

Colchester Casuals once had a close relationship with Colchester United when Benny Fenton was the manager with several of the Casuals players turning out regularly at Colchester United's Layer Road ground in the Combination League or the Southern Mid-Week Football League.

The club folded in 1970 due to financial problems and difficulties raising a full team.

== Honours ==
- Essex and Suffolk Border League - Division II Junior
  - Winners 1896-1897 season
- Essex and Suffolk Border League - Premier Division
  - Champions 1946–1947 season
- British Legion Cup
  - Winners 1946–1947 season
- Essex and Suffolk Border League Cup
  - Winners 1946–1947 season
  - Winners 1960–1961 season
- Clacton Hospital Cup
  - Runners-up 1946–1947 season
- Whitton Charity Cup
  - Runner-up 1946–1947 season
- Bromley Cup
  - Winners 1949–1950 season

== Records ==
- Best FA Cup performance: Preliminary round, 1949–50

== Former players ==
- Barrie Aitchison went on to play for Tottenham Hotspur & Colchester United.
- Cecil Allan played for Colchester United & Northern Ireland.
- John Baines went on to play for Colchester United.
- John Bond went on to play for West Ham United.
- Dave Coleman went on to play for Colchester United.
- Brian Dobson went on to play for Colchester United.
- Richie Griffiths went on to play for Colchester United.
- Bobby Hunt went on to play for Colchester United & Ipswich Town
- Tony Howe went on to play for Colchester United.
- Roger Joslyn went on to play for Colchester United, Aldershot, Waford & Reading.
- Vic Keeble went on to play for Colchester United, Newcastle United & West Ham United
- George Leslie played for Red Star Olympique, Walsall, & Colchester United.
- Mick Loughton who in 1964 went on play for Colchester United.
- Colin Lundstrum went on to play for West Ham United, Ipswich Town & Colchester United.
- John "Jack" McClelland went on to play for Stoke City.
- Frank Smith played in goal for Tottenham Hotspur.
