= Duncan Forbes (footballer) =

Scottish footballer (1941–2019)

Personal information
- Full name: Duncan Scott Forbes
- Date of birth: 19 June 1941
- Place of birth: Edinburgh, Scotland
- Date of death: 23 October 2019 (aged 78)
- Place of death: Norwich, England
- Position: Central defender

Senior career*
Years	Team	Apps	(Gls)
????–1961	Musselburgh Athletic		
1961–1968	Colchester United	270	(3)
1968–1981	Norwich City	295	(10)
1976–1977	→ Torquay United (loan)	7	(0)
- Great Yarmouth Town
- Diss Town
Total		572	(13)
- * Club domestic league appearances and goals

Duncan Scott Forbes (19 June 1941 – 23 October 2019) was a Scottish professional footballer. He spent 33 years at Norwich City, 13 as a player, seven on the commercial staff and 13 as chief scout. The Times noted his aggressive defending by writing "Forbes got his customary booking; the referee ought to take his name in the changing room rather than on the pitch thus saving time."

== Career ==
Forbes joined Colchester United in September 1961 from Scottish non-league side Musselburgh Athletic, making his league debut later that season. He quickly established himself as a regular in the Layer Road side, playing in two promotion-winning teams and two relegation teams over the next 7 years.

In September 1968, after playing 270 league games for Colchester, scoring twice, he moved to Norwich City for a fee of £10,000. At Carrow Road, he helped the Canaries into Division One, and in 1970 he was voted the fourth winner of the Barry Butler Trophy, the fans' award for player of the year. He was captain of the Norwich team that won promotion to the first division for the first time in 1972.

In October 1976 he looked to have lost his place and joined Torquay United on loan. He returned to Carrow Road and won his place back, finishing his Norwich career with 295 league appearances, in which he scored 10 times. On leaving Norwich he played for Great Yarmouth Town, before joining Diss Town as player-coach.

Playing colleague Dave Stringer said of Forbes, "If he shouted in Norwich it could be heard in Yarmouth", adding that "his former defensive partner was the 'perfect leader'".

== Retirement ==
Within a year of leaving Carrow Road, he returned, joining the Norwich City commercial staff where he was in charge of Club Canary organising trips to away matches. In March 1988, he was appointed as Norwich's Chief Scout, a post he held until his retirement in 2001, by which time he had spent 33 almost unbroken years at Carrow Road.

In 2002, Forbes was made an inaugural member of the Norwich City F.C. Hall of Fame.

In 2013, Forbes, suffering from Alzheimer's disease, moved to a care home.

Alongside Karl Duguid, Forbes was inducted into Colchester United's Hall of Fame at the club's annual Former Players' Dinner on 30 January 2016. Ray Crawford accepted the award on Forbes' behalf.

== Death and legacy ==
Forbes died at Woodside House Care Home on 24 October 2019 at the age of 78. Joint majority shareholders Delia Smith and Michael Wynn-Jones issued a statement remarking that "We have lost not only a club legend but someone who will forever be part of Norwich City folklore. City to the core, and one of the nicest men you could hope to meet, Duncan will be sorely missed by the club, but his legacy will forever live on."

In 2022, Norwich City set about marking Forbes' contributions to the club. The Norwich City Community Sports Foundation launched a new project to support people with dementia, called "Duncan's club", and a mural the height of the stadium was painted on Carrow Road, featuring an image of Forbes and the text "6 foot 2, eyes of blue, Duncan Forbes is after you". A permanent plaque has also been installed.

Forbes was an inaugural inductee into the Norwich City F.C. Hall of Fame.

== Honours ==
Norwich City

- Football League Second Division: 1971–72
- Football League Cup runner-up: 1972–73, 1974–75

Individual

- Colchester United Player of the Year: 1967
- Norwich City Player of the Season: 1969–70

Sporting positions
Preceded by Ken Mallender	Norwich City Captain; 1969–1976	Succeeded by Martin Peters
