= Richie Griffiths =

English footballer

Personal information
- Full name: Richard David Griffiths
- Date of birth: 21 March 1942 (age 84)
- Place of birth: Earls Colne, England
- Position: Full-back

Youth career
- Colchester United

Senior career*
Years	Team	Apps	(Gls)
–1961	Colchester Casuals		
1961–1965	Colchester United	48	(0)
Total		48	(0)
- * Club domestic league appearances and goals

Richard David "Richie" Griffiths (born 21 March 1942) is an English former footballer who played in the Football League as a fullback for Colchester United.

== Career ==
Born in Earls Colne, Griffiths joined local club Colchester United as an apprentice, breaking into the first team squad in 1962. He made his debut on 3 February 1962 in a 1–1 away draw with Hartlepools United and went on to make 48 league appearances for the club. He made his final appearance on 5 October 1964 in a 1–0 home defeat to Grimsby Town before retiring from the game to join the Police force. He also played for local amateur side Colchester Casuals after leaving the U's.
