= Abberton, Essex =

Village in Essex, England

Coordinates: 51.8337°N 0.9118°E

Abberton
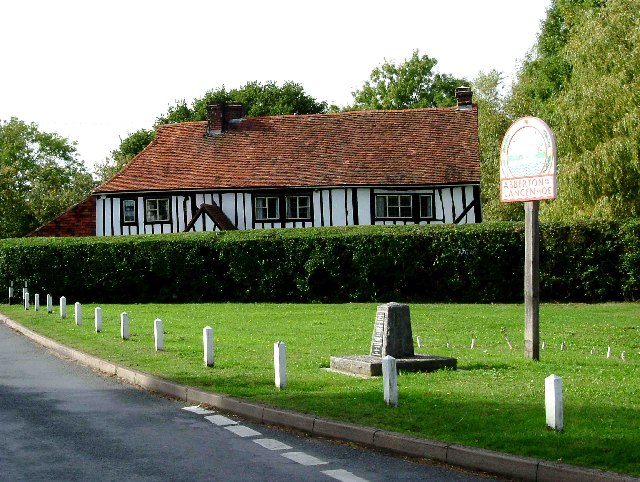
- Village sign for Abberton and Langenhoe

- Location within Essex
- Population: 448 (Parish, 2021)
- OS grid reference: TM007190
- Civil parish: Abberton
- District: City of Colchester
- Shire county: Essex
- Region: East
- Country: England
- Sovereign state: United Kingdom
- Post town: COLCHESTER
- Postcode district: CO5
- Dialling code: 01206
- Police: Essex
- Fire: Essex
- Ambulance: East of England
- UK Parliament: North Essex

Abberton is a village and civil parish in the City of Colchester district of Essex, England. It is located approximately 0.62 mi (1.00 km) east of Abberton Reservoir and is 4.2 mi (6.8 km) south of Colchester. The village is in the parliamentary constituency of North Essex. It shares a grouped parish council with the neighbouring parish of Langenhoe. The parish boundary between Abberton and Langenhoe follows Mersea Road (the B1025). The two villages now form a single built up area, which the Office for National Statistics calls "Langenhoe and Abberton". At the 2021 census Abberton parish had a population of 448, and the Langenhoe and Abberton built up area had a population of 1,015.

== Etymology ==
The name Abberton is derived from 'Eadburg's estate' (Ēadburge + tūn).

== History ==
Abberton is recorded in the Domesday Book of 1086-87 as Edburghetuna and as Edburgetuna in the Hundred of Winstree, when it was part of the lands of Count Eustace in Essex, held by Ralph de Marcy and further held by Ranulf Peverel in demesne; it was held by Siward, a free man, as a manor in the time of King Edward the Confessor before the Norman Conquest of 1066. It was later recorded as Eadburgetona in 1108, Adbur(u)g(h)(e)ton(e) in 1208–1321, Adburthon in 1280, also Abberton from 1230.

Abberton was among the villages which suffered damage from the 1884 Colchester earthquake: chimneys had fallen to the ground, brick walls had cracked and many side walls of houses had collapsed; the rectory which was being built at the time also suffered considerable damage.

== Church ==
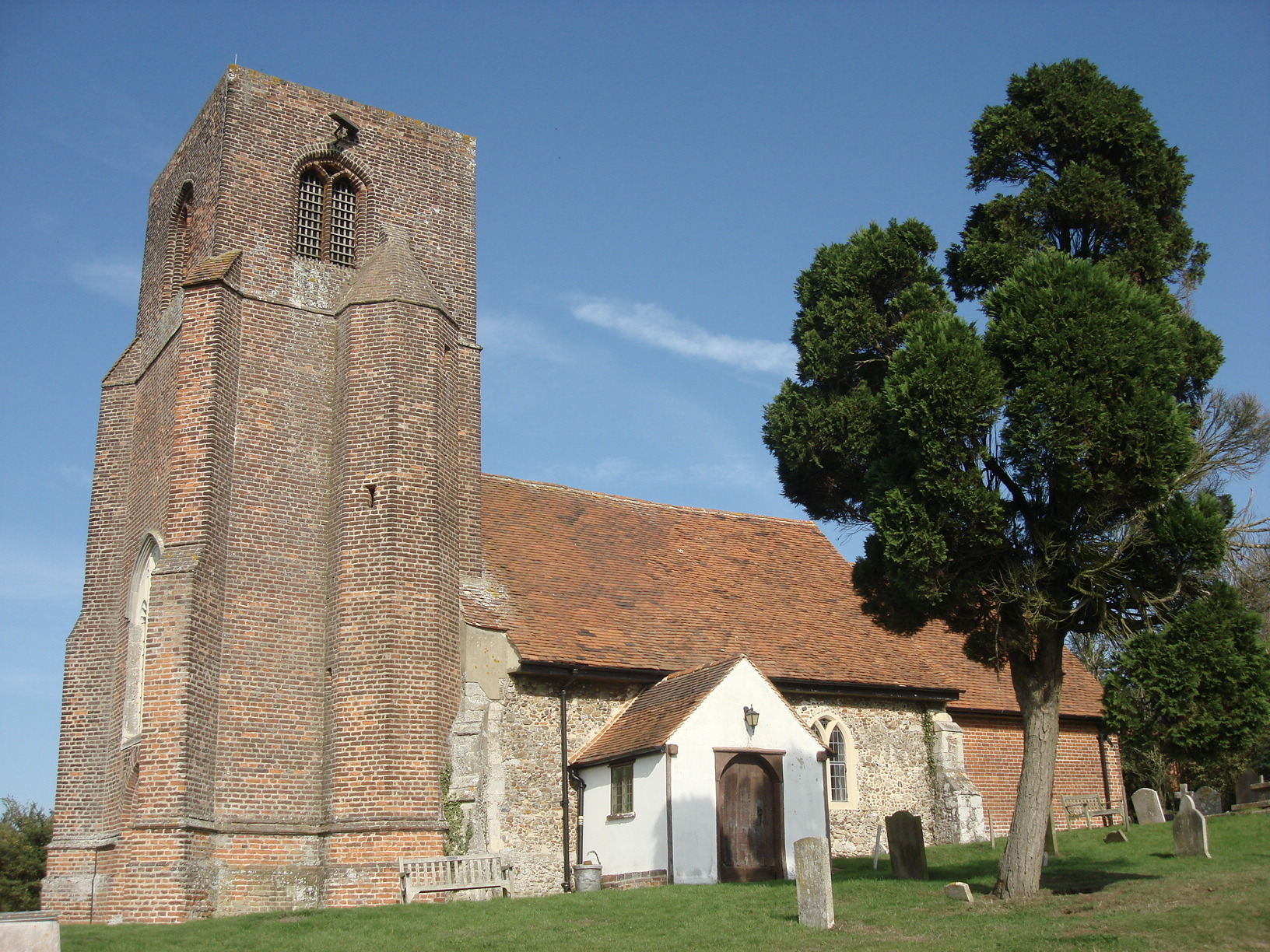
Church of St Andrew, Abberton

The parish church at Abberton is dedicated to St Andrew. It is a Grade II* listed building and originates from at least the 14th century. It is located at the end of Rectory Lane, approximately three hundred yards from Abberton Reservoir.
