= Bobby Hunt (footballer, born 1942) =

English footballer (born 1942)

Personal information
- Date of birth: 1 October 1942 (age 84)
- Place of birth: Colchester, England
- Position: Forward

Senior career*
Years	Team	Apps	(Gls)
1959–1964	Colchester United	149	(81)
1964–1966	Northampton Town	40	(10)
1966–1968	Millwall	43	(13)
1968–1971	Ipswich Town	26	(4)
1971–1973	Charlton Athletic	36	(11)
1972–1973	→ Northampton Town (loan)	5	(3)
1973–1974	Reading	16	(3)
1974–1975	Maidstone United	?	(?)
Total		315	(125)
- * Club domestic league appearances and goals

Robert Rex Hunt (born 1 October 1942) is an English former footballer who played as a forward in the Football League.

== Career ==
Born in Colchester, Essex, Hunt began his career with hometown club Colchester United in 1959, where he made 149 league appearances, scoring 81 goals. He was signed by Northampton Town in 1964 where he spent two season, scoring 10 goals in 40 league appearances. Hunt holds the record for the most goals in a Football League season for the U's, notching up 39 goals in one campaign. He formed a partnership with Martyn King, the two strikers regularly scoring over 20 goals a season during their time with the club. In 2008, Hunt was inducted into the Colchester United Hall of Fame. He moved to Millwall in 1966, scoring 13 in 43 league games, before moving to Ipswich Town, with a record of just four goals in 26 appearances between 1968 and 1971, although he was part of the Second Division winning team of 1967–68. His next club was Charlton Athletic. During his time with Charlton, he scored 11 goals in 36 league games, and was also loaned to former club Northampton, where he scored three goals in five games. He left Charlton for Reading in 1973 where he spent one year, making 16 appearances and scoring three goals. He finished his career with Maidstone United.

== Honours ==
Colchester United

- Football League Fourth Division Runner-up (1): 1961–62

Ipswich Town

- Football League Second Division Winner (1): 1967–68

== Outside football ==
After retiring, Hunt worked in the commercial department at Colchester United.

Hunt stood as an independent candidate in the 2012 elections to Colchester Council. He campaigned against the Council's proposed closure of Joyce Brooks House, a sheltered housing complex he currently lives in. He reached second place in the polls, receiving 194 votes, but failed to overtake the Labour incumbent Tina Dopson, who was re-elected with 926 votes.
