= John Fraser =

John Fraser may refer to:

== Politics ==
- John Simon Frederick Fraser (1765–1803), commanded the Fraser Fencibles in Ireland and was MP for Inverness-shire
- John James Fraser (1829–1896), premier of the Canadian province of New Brunswick, 1878–1882
- John A. Fraser (politician) (1840–1908), political figure in Nova Scotia
- John G. Fraser (1840–1927), Orange Free State politician
- John Fraser (Ontario MP) (1849–1928), Canadian member of parliament for Lambton East, Ontario
- John Fraser (British Columbia politician) (1866–1960), Canadian member of parliament from British Columbia, 1925–1935
- Sir Malcolm Fraser, 1st Baronet (John Malcolm Fraser, 1878–1949), British newspaper editor and political agent
- John Malcolm Fraser (1930–2015), prime minister of Australia, 1975–1983
- John Allen Fraser (1931–2024), speaker of the Canadian House of Commons, 1986–1993
- John Fraser (British politician) (1934–2017), British member of parliament for Norwood
- John Fraser (Ontario MPP) (born 1958), Canadian politician elected to the Ontario legislature for Ottawa South in 2013
- Jock Fraser (1912–1981), Canadian politician, member of the Legislative Assembly of New Brunswick

== Sports ==
- John Fraser (footballer, born 1876) (1876–1952), Scottish footballer, Southampton player and Dundee manager
- John Fraser (Canadian soccer) (1881–1959), Canadian soccer player and member of the 1904 Olympic Games Canadian Team
- John Fraser (tennis) (1935–2026), Australian tennis player of the 1950s and 60s
- John Fraser (footballer, born 1936) (1936–2025), Scottish footballer for Hibernian
- John Fraser (footballer, born 1938) (1938–2011), Northern Ireland footballer for Sunderland and Watford
- John Fraser (footballer, born 1953), English footballer for Fulham
- John Fraser (footballer, born 1978), Scottish footballer whose clubs include Ross County, Clyde and Forfar Athletic

== Academia ==
- John Fraser (botanist) (1750–1811), Scottish botanist
- John Fraser (academic) (1827–1878), president of Pennsylvania State University, 1866–1868
- John Fraser (Celticist) (1882–1945), Jesus Professor of Celtic at the University of Oxford
- John Fraser (journalist) (born 1944), Canadian journalist and master of Massey College, University of Toronto

== Others ==
- John Fraser (died 1306), Scottish independence fighter, brother of Simon Fraser
- John Fraser (bishop) (died 1507), bishop of Ross, Scotland
- John Fraser (frontiersman) (1721–1773), colonial Pennsylvanian fur trader and soldier
- John Fraser (British Army officer, born 1760) (1760–1843)
- John Fraser (poet, died 1849) (c. 1809–1849), Irish poet
- John Fraser (architect) (1825–1906), American architect
- John Fraser (ethnologist) (1834–1904), Australian ethnologist
- John Arthur Fraser (1838–1898), British artist, photography entrepreneur and teacher
- John Fraser (1843–1907), Scottish businessman who partnered with David Chalmers Neave to co-found Fraser and Neave
- John Fraser (physician) (1844–1925), Scottish physician
- Sir John Foster Fraser (1868–1936), British Parliamentary correspondent and travel writer
- John Fraser (auditor), auditor general of Canada, 1905–1919
- Sir John Fraser, 1st Baronet, of Tain (1885–1947), professor of surgery and principal of the University of Edinburgh, 1944–1948
- John R. Fraser (1890–1959), Canadian physician
- John Fraser (minister) (1894–1985), moderator of the General Assembly of the Church of Scotland, 1958–1959
- John Fraser (British Army officer, born 1896) (1896–1943), British recipient of the George Cross
- John Fraser (critic) (1928–2023), English/Canadian author, literary theorist, and cultural analyst
- John Fraser (film producer) (1930–2010), Australian film producer and cinema executive
- John Fraser (actor) (1931–2020), Scottish actor
- John MacLeod Fraser (1935–2010), Canadian ambassador to China
- John Fraser (writer, born 1939), English professor, novelist, and poet
- John A. Fraser (businessman) (born 1951), Australian businessman
- John Fraser, musician in the James Wright Group
- Sir John George Fraser (1864–1941), British colonial administrator in British Ceylon

== Other uses ==
- John B. Fraser, a steamship lost on Lake Nipissing, Ontario

== See also ==
- Jack Fraser (disambiguation)
- John Frazer (disambiguation)
- John Frazier (disambiguation)
