= John Frazer =

John Frazer may refer to:

- John Frazer (Australian footballer) (born 1956), Australian rules footballer for North Melbourne and Fitzroy
- John Frazer (architect) (born 1945), English architect and CAD pioneer
- John Frazer (cricketer) (1901–1927), Australian-born English cricketer
- John Frazer (politician) (1827–1884), Irish-born Australian politician and businessman
- John Fries Frazer (1812–1872), American geologist
- John W. Frazer (1827–1906), American soldier, planter, and businessman

== See also ==
- Jack Frazer (born 1931), Canadian politician
- John Fraser (disambiguation)
- John Frazier (disambiguation)
