= Penstemon guadalupensis =

- In Mills County, Texas

Conservation status
- Vulnerable (NatureServe)

Scientific classification
- Kingdom: Plantae
- Clade: Tracheophytes
- Clade: Angiosperms
- Clade: Eudicots
- Clade: Asterids
- Order: Lamiales
- Family: Plantaginaceae
- Genus: Penstemon
- Species: P. guadalupensis

Binomial name
- Penstemon guadalupensis A.Heller

Plant species in the veronica family

Penstemon guadalupensis, the Guadalupe penstemon or Hill Country foxglove, is a species in the veronica family that only grows in the US state of Texas. There it is found on the eastern Edwards Plateau and areas to the northwest.

== Description ==
The Guadalupe penstemon is a herbaceous plant with flowering stems that grow straight upwards or leaning out from the base of the plant before growing upwards to a height of 20 to 50 centimeters (8–19.5 in). They are covered in retrorse hairs, stiff ones that point backwards. It forms small colonies and spreads by underground stems. It is relatively long-lived for a penstemon.

The plants have both basal leaves and ones attached to the stems. The basal leaves and the lowest ones on the stems measure 2.5 to 9.5 centimeters (1–3.5 in) long and just 1–6 millimeters wide. This usually gives them a narrow grass-like shape, only rarely lanceolate. They have a tapered base, a pointed tip, and smooth edges. The basal leaves will persist over the winter. Attached to the stems there are six to eleven leaf pairs, most of them are attached directly by the leaf base to the main stem, but the lowest ones can have short petioles, leaf stems. They are 2.2–9.5 cm long, but can be wider at 1–1.8 mm, though typically they are no more than 6.5 cm (2.5 in) and less than 10 mm in width. They can be fully lanceolate to linear, the widest part of the leaf in the lower third of the length. The base of the stem leaves can be tapered or clasp the main stem and the edges are smooth to very slightly serratedly toothed.

The flowers are white, slightly pink, or very pale purple, with purple floral guide lines along the bottom of the flower's throat. The petals are fused into a funnel shaped tube that opens to five lobes with a length of 1.3–2 centimeters (0.5–0.8 in).

== Taxonomy ==
The scientific description of Penstemon guadalupensis was published in 1895 Amos Arthur Heller. Specimens collected prior to Heller's description were identified as the similarly colored Penstemon albidus. He collected his type specimen on 19 April 1894 near the confluence of the Guadalupe River and Town Creek. It is classified in the Penstemon genus within the Plantaginaceae family. The species has no accepted subspecies or varieties, however two subspecies and one variety have been published that are considered heterotypic synonyms.

Table of Synonyms
Name	Year	Rank	Notes
Penstemon guadalupensis var. ernestii (Pennell) Cory	1936	variety	
Penstemon guadalupensis subsp. ernestii Pennell	1935	subspecies	
Penstemon guadalupensis subsp. typicus Pennell	1935	subspecies	not validly publ.

=== Names ===
The scientific name of the species, guadalupensis, is derived from the Guadalupe River. It is known by the common names Guadalupe penstemon, Guadalupe beardtongue, and Hill Country foxglove. It is also called white penstemon and white beardtongue, however Penstemon albidus is more frequently know by these names, additionally its species name is Botanical Latin meaning white.

== Range and habitat ==
Guadalupe penstemons are endemic to Texas in the south-central United States. There it grows on the eastern Edwards Plateau and to the northwest on the Lampasas Cut Plain. In the Texas Hill Country it is only found in a few scattered areas of Llano and Gillespie counties, but is common in Brown and Comanche counties. Other counties where it is reported include Kerr and San Saba counties in the east and Sutton, Irion, Tom Green, Coke, Nolan, Mitchell, and Scurry to the west, bringing the number of counties to twelve. Approximately 30 populations have been documented, but this number is likely to double with future surveys.

The species grows in open areas on sandy or gravelly soils that are calcareous at elevations of 400–800 meters (1,300–2,600 ft). It can be found in the southern Cross Timbers, Edwards Plateau, and southernmost part of the Central Great Plains, called the Rolling Plains in Texas.

== See also ==
- List of Penstemon species
