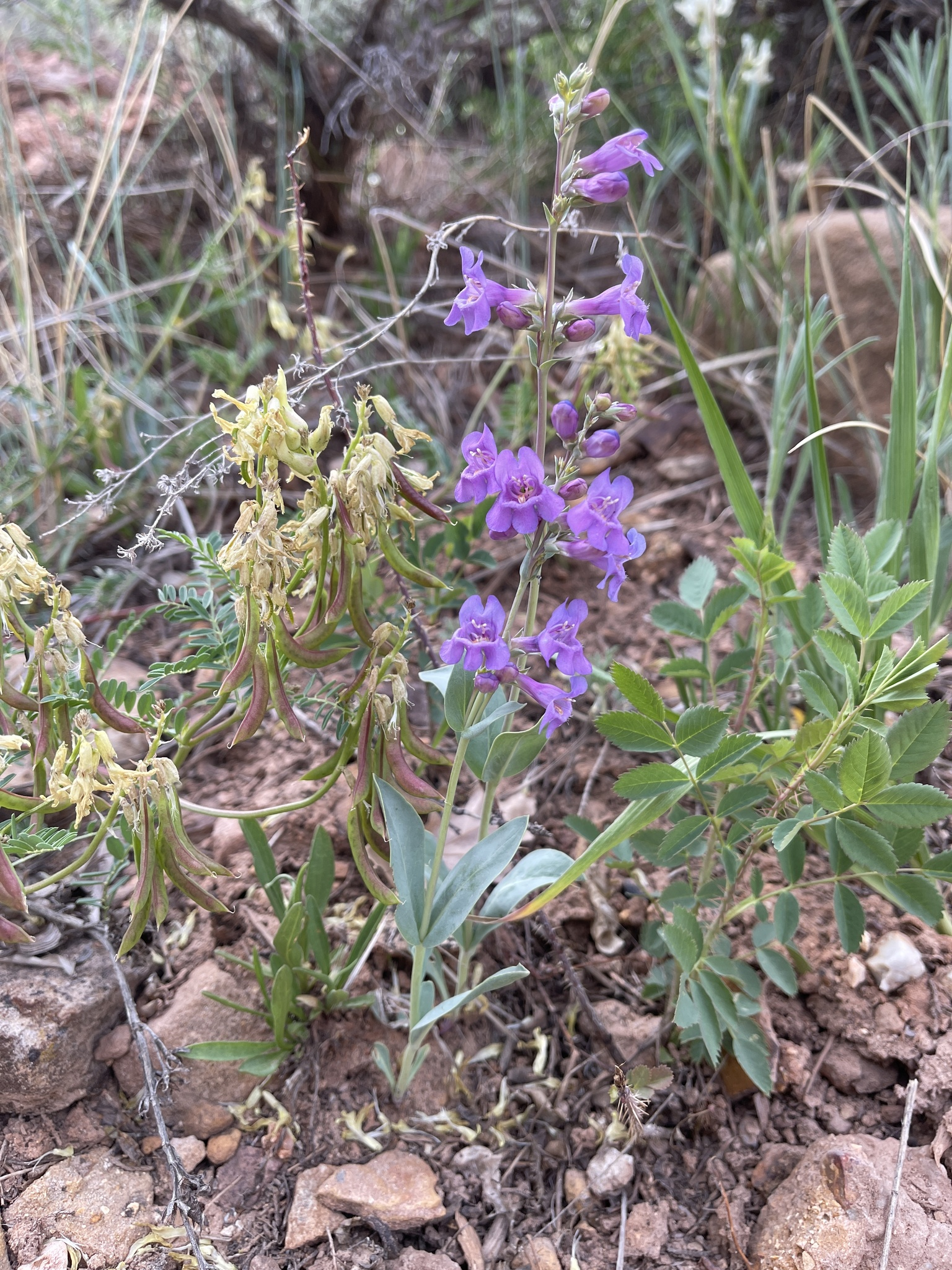
- Variety lentus in San Juan County, Utah

Conservation status
- Apparently Secure (NatureServe)

Scientific classification
- Kingdom: Plantae
- Clade: Embryophytes
- Clade: Tracheophytes
- Clade: Spermatophytes
- Clade: Angiosperms
- Clade: Eudicots
- Clade: Asterids
- Order: Lamiales
- Family: Plantaginaceae
- Genus: Penstemon
- Species: P. lentus

Binomial name
- Penstemon lentus Pennell

Varieties
- P. l. var. albiflorus; P. l. var. lentus

= Penstemon lentus =

Plant species in the veronica family

Penstemon lentus, the handsome penstemon, is a species of purple flowering plant from Four Corners region in the southwestern United states.

== Description ==
Handsome penstemon is a herbaceous species that can grow 14 to 60 centimeters (5.5 to 23.5 in) tall, but usually does not get taller than 40 cm (16 in). A plant may have just one flowering stem or several that grow from a thick or branching caudex. They are hairless and glaucous, covered in natural waxes giving it a bluish color.

The leaves on handsome penstemons have a fleshy texture with smooth edges. The basal leaves are attached by leaf stems and lowest one on the stems might have short leaf stems or attach directly at the leaf base. The basal leaves and the lowest cauline, the leaves on the stems, measure 4 to 11 centimeters long, but only rarely longer than 6.5 cm, and are usually 0.8 to 2 cm wide, only rarely as wide as 3 cm. On the stems they have two to four pairs of cauline leaves. The upper ones are always sessile and sometimes clasp the stem with projecting leaf lobes. They measure 0.9 to 6 cm long and 0.7–2.6 cm wide.

The upper part of each stem is the thyrse, a type of inflorescence, and measures 5–23 cm. The flowers can either somewhat spaced into distinct groups or continuous and are usually secund, all facing in one direction away from the stem. The flowers are arranged in four to eight groups with one to four flowers to each point of attachment. Only the lowest one or two groups of flower will have a noticble pair of bracts associated with them. The flowers range in color from violet to blue or pinkish blue, though a variety only found in the Abajo Mountains is white. They also can have red-violet floral guide lines. They have two distinct lips to the flower opening and are hairless on the outside, though they might have some sparse white hairs inside the flower's throat. Overall the fused petals measure 1.7–2.2 cm long and have the form of a somewhat funnel shaped tube. The stamens do not extend out of the flower's mouth, but the longest pair can just reach the opening. The staminode, covered with yellowish hairs, reaches the mouth or slightly extends out of the flower.

The fruit is a capsule 9–12 millimeters long and 5–7 mm wide. It contains seeds that are 3.5–5 mm.

== Taxonomy ==
Penstemon lentus was scientifically described and named by Francis W. Pennell in 1920. It is classified in the genus Penstemon within the larger family Plantaginaceae. The type specimen used to describe the species was collected by Charles Fuller Baker on 3 June 1899 in Arboles, Colorado. It has two accepted varieties.

=== Penstemon lentus var. albiflorus ===
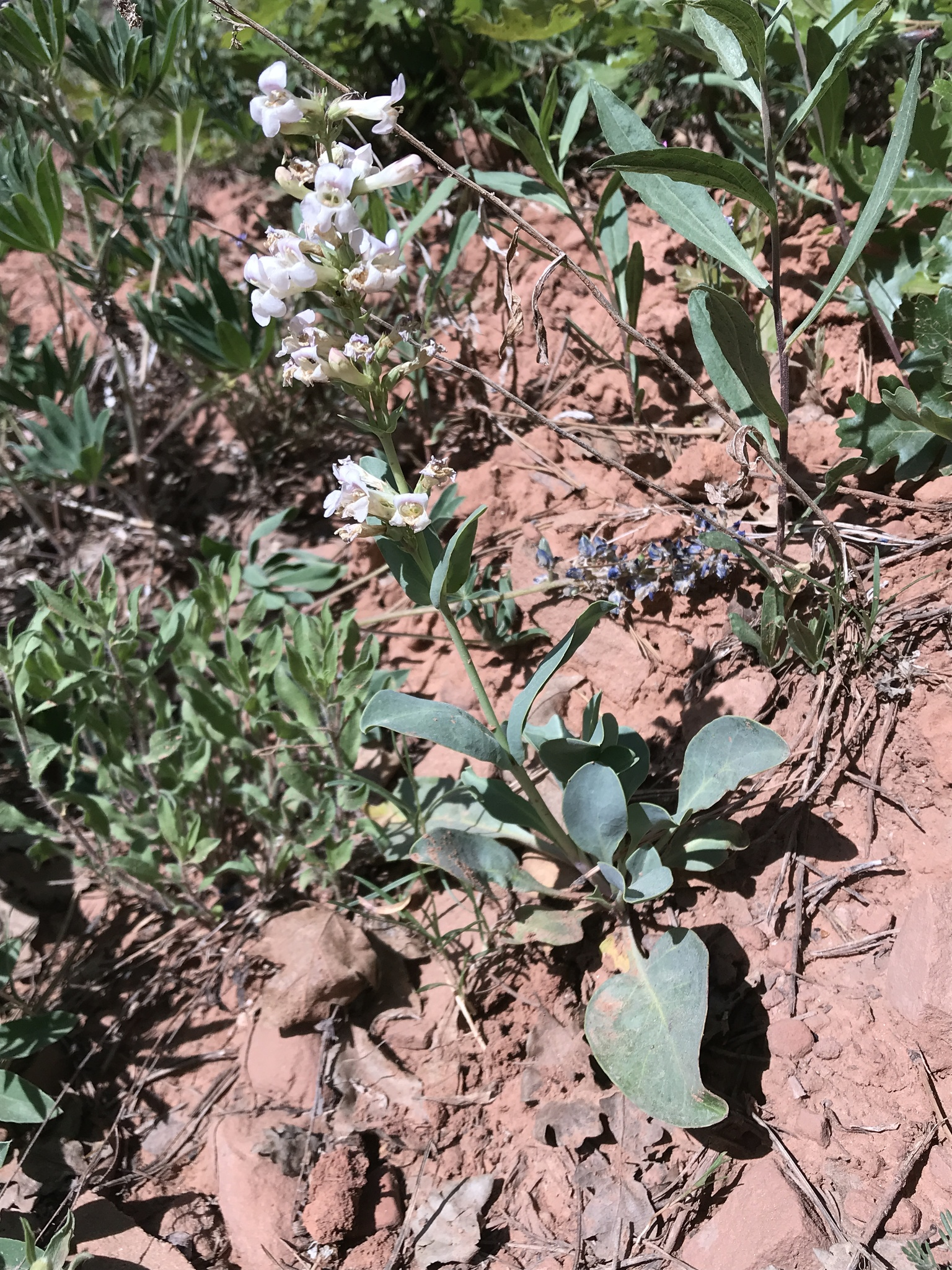
Variety albiflorus in the Bears Ears National Monument, Utah

This variety was initially described by David D. Keck in 1940 as a subspecies. It was reclassified as a variety in 1975 by James L. Reveal. It is only found in the Abajo Mountains of Utah. It grows at elevations of 1,300 to 2,600 meters (4,300 to 8,500 ft). It is rated as a vulnerable variety by NatureServe. Due to its color it is sometimes called white penstemon, however the much more common and widespread Penstemon albidus is also known by this name.

=== Penstemon lentus var. lentus ===
The autonymic variety is more widespread, growing in Colorado, New Mexico, Utah, and Arizona. It has no synonyms.

=== Names ===
The species name lentus means "pliant" or "flexible" in Botanical Latin. It is known by the common names of handsome penstemon or handsome beardtongue.

== Range and habitat ==
Handsome penstemon is endemic to the Colorado Plateau in the Southwestern United States. It is reported from northwestern New Mexico and northeastern Arizona in the Four Corners, although it is much less common than in Utah or Colorado it is not considered a rare plant in New Mexico. In Colorado it grows in at least five counties in the southwest corner of the state while in Utah it only grows in San Juan County, but more specimen collections have been made in Utah than in Colorado. It can be found at elevations of 1,300 to 2,600 meters (4,300 to 8,500 ft).

The species grows in sandy or gravelly soils in dry locations. It is associated with ponderosa pine forests, pinyon–juniper woodlands, scrub oak thickets, and sagebrush scrub.

=== Conservation ===
When evaluated by NatureServe in 2004 they rated the species as apparently secure (G4) at the global level. In Colorado and New Mexico it is rated as vulnerable (S3) at the state level and imperiled (S2) in Arizona, but has not been rated in Utah.

== See also ==
- List of Penstemon species
