= Jack Fraser =

Jack Fraser may refer to:

- Jack Fraser (ice hockey, born 1882) (1882–1942)
- Charles Fraser (ice hockey) (1897–1970)

== See also ==
- Jack Fraser, a Canadian clothing retailer owned by Grafton-Fraser
- John Fraser (disambiguation)
