= Charles Frazer (cricketer) =

Australian-born English cricketer (1905–1971)

Personal information
- Full name: Charles Ewan Frazer
- Born: 23 September 1905; Woollahra, New South Wales, Australia
- Died: 30 April 1971 (aged 65); Tenterden, Kent, England
- Batting: Right-handed
- Bowling: Right-arm slow
- Relatives: John Frazer (brother)

Domestic team information
- Years: Team
- 1927–1928: Oxford University

Career statistics
Competition	First-class
Matches	4
Runs scored	101
Batting average	12.62
100s/50s	–/–
Top score	42
Catches/stumpings	2/–
- Source: Cricinfo, 21 February 2019

Charles Ewan Frazer OBE (23 September 1905 – 30 April 1971) was an Australian-born English first-class cricketer.

Frazer was born at Sydney, the son of an Australian doctor who took his medical degree at the University of Oxford and then settled at East Grinstead, Sussex. He was educated at Winchester College, before going up to Balliol College, Oxford. While studying at Oxford, he made his debut in first-class cricket for Oxford University against Lancashire at Oxford in 1927. He made two further appearances in first-class cricket for Oxford, with a second match in 1927 against Leicestershire, before playing against Derbyshire in 1928. Frazer also made one first-class appearance for the Free Foresters in 1927 against Oxford University. He scored a total of 101 run across his four matches, with a high score of 43. After graduating from Oxford, Frazer became a solicitor.

Shortly before the start of the Second World War, Frazer joined the Royal Artillery as a second lieutenant (having previously been a cadet sergeant in the Winchester College Cadet Contingent). Frazer was mentioned in dispatches for gallantry during action in the Middle East. He was made an OBE in the 1946 New Year Honours, by which point he held the temporary rank of colonel. He exceeded the age for recall in May 1956 and was removed from the Territorial Army Reserve List, retaining the honorary rank of colonel.

He died at Tenterden in April 1971. His older brother, John, also played first-class cricket.
