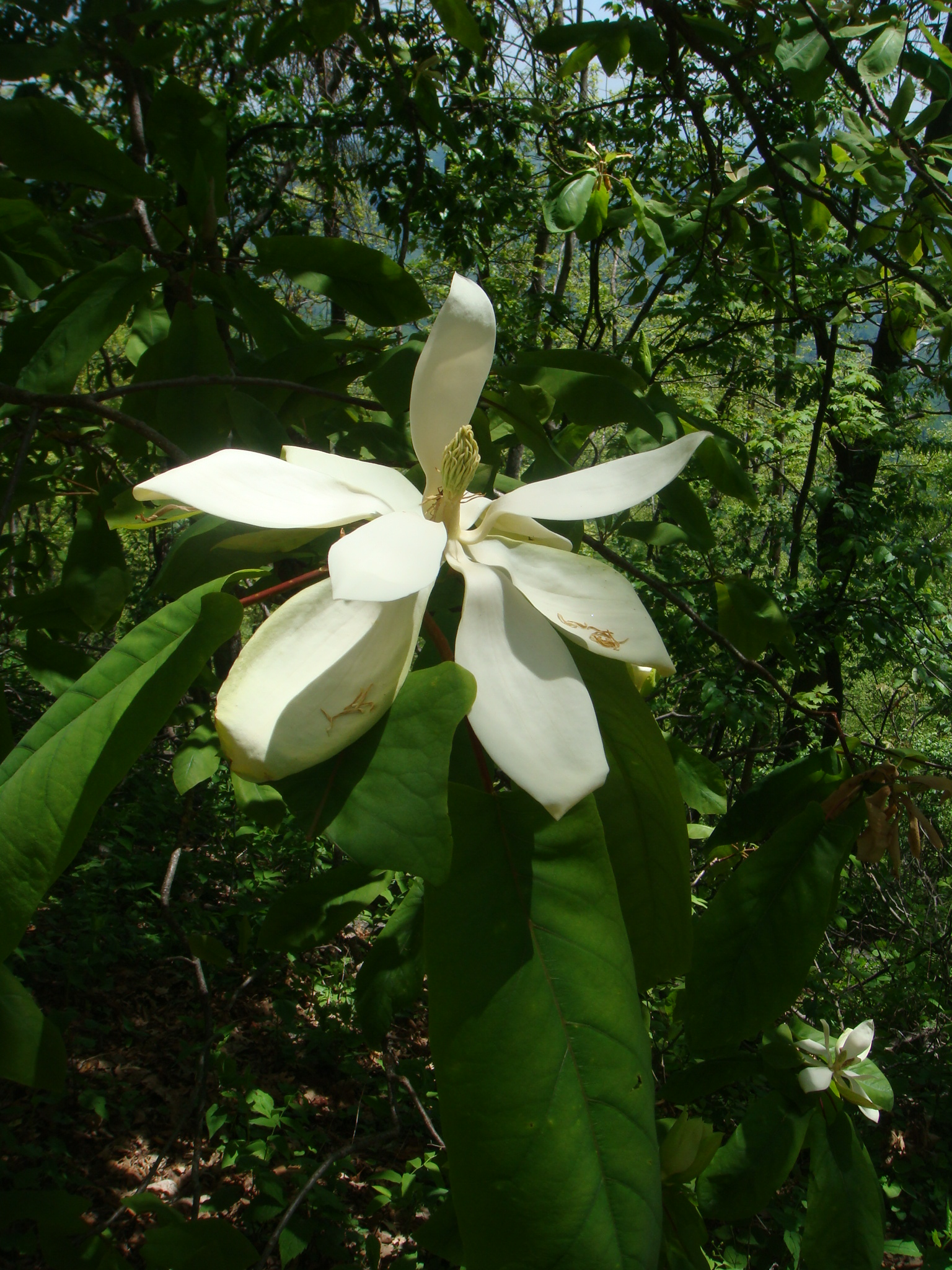
- Magnolia fraseri var. fraseri in flower on the Blue Ridge Parkway

Conservation status
- Least Concern (IUCN 3.1)

Scientific classification
- Kingdom: Plantae
- Clade: Tracheophytes
- Clade: Angiosperms
- Clade: Magnoliids
- Order: Magnoliales
- Family: Magnoliaceae
- Genus: Magnolia
- Subgenus: Magnolia subg. Magnolia
- Section: Magnolia sect. Auriculata
- Species: M. fraseri

Binomial name
- Magnolia fraseri Walter
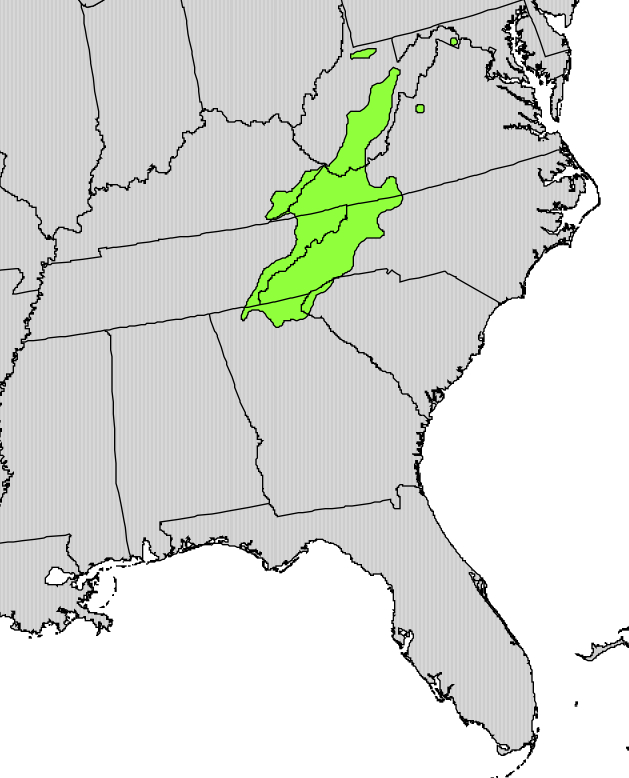
- Natural range of var. fraseri (excludes var. pyramidata)

= Magnolia fraseri =

Fraser's magnolia

Species of tree

Magnolia fraseri, commonly known as Fraser's magnolia, Fraser magnolia, mountain magnolia, earleaf cucumbertree, or mountain-oread, is a species of magnolia native to the southeastern United States in the southern Appalachian Mountains and adjacent Atlantic and Gulf Coastal Plain from West Virginia to northern Florida and to eastern Texas. The Appalachian plants are classified as Magnolia fraseri var. fraseri, and the more coastal plants as M. fraseri var. pyramidata. These two kinds of magnolia are sometimes recognized as distinct species, M. fraseri and M. pyramidata, respectively.

== Description ==
Fraser's magnolia (named after the Scottish botanist John Fraser) is a small, deciduous tree growing to 25 m (80 ft) tall, as a basal-branching, fragrant plant, with gray and brown, unfurrowed bark; similar to beech, but more "warty" and mossy. The leaves are quite large, 15–25 cm (rarely up to 53 cm) long and 8–18 cm (rarely up to 29 cm) broad, with a pair of auricles (or "ear-lobes") at the base and an entire margin; they are green above and glaucous blue-green below. The showy white flowers are 16–25 cm in diameter with nine tepals; they open in late spring or early summer, after the foliage. The fruit is a woody, oblong, cone-like structure (like all magnolias) 6.5–12 cm long, covered in small, pod-like follicles each containing one or two red seeds that hang out from the cone by a slender thread when ripe. A good seed crop occurs only about every 4–5 years. Reproduction is accomplished by both seed and vegetative sprouts. The fruit is eaten by wildlife, helping disperse the seeds. In the Appalachian Mountains, Fraser's Magnolia is a popular nest tree for the northern flying squirrel.

The tree grows best on rich, moist, well-drained soil. The very large showy white flowers and large-leaved, coarse-textured foliage make it an attractive ornamental tree, but otherwise it has little commercial value. It is sometimes cultivated in North America as a native alternative to exotic magnolias and can be grown a considerable distance north of its natural range if given conditions favorable to its growth.

There are two varieties:

- Magnolia fraseri var. fraseri, native to the Appalachian Mountains.
- Magnolia fraseri var. pyramidata (Bartram) Pampanini, from the Coastal Plain. The vernacular name for this variety is pyramid magnolia.

== Gallery ==
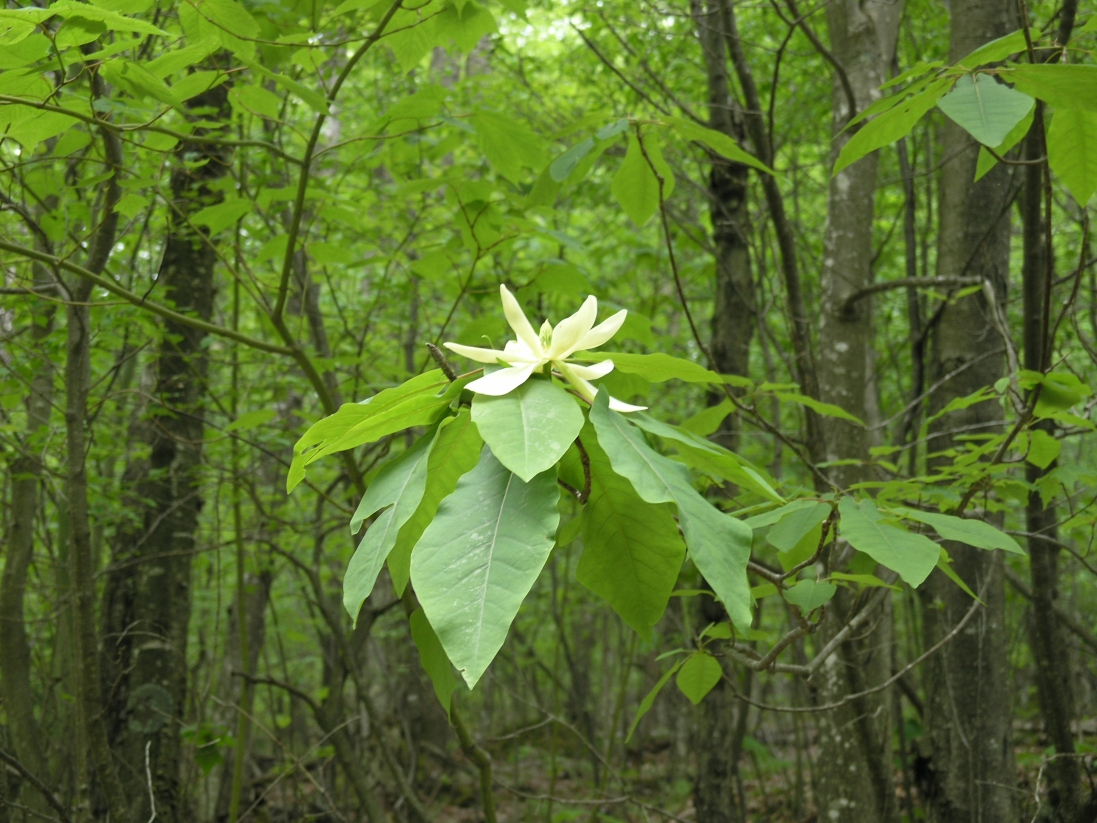
M. fraseri in young forest.

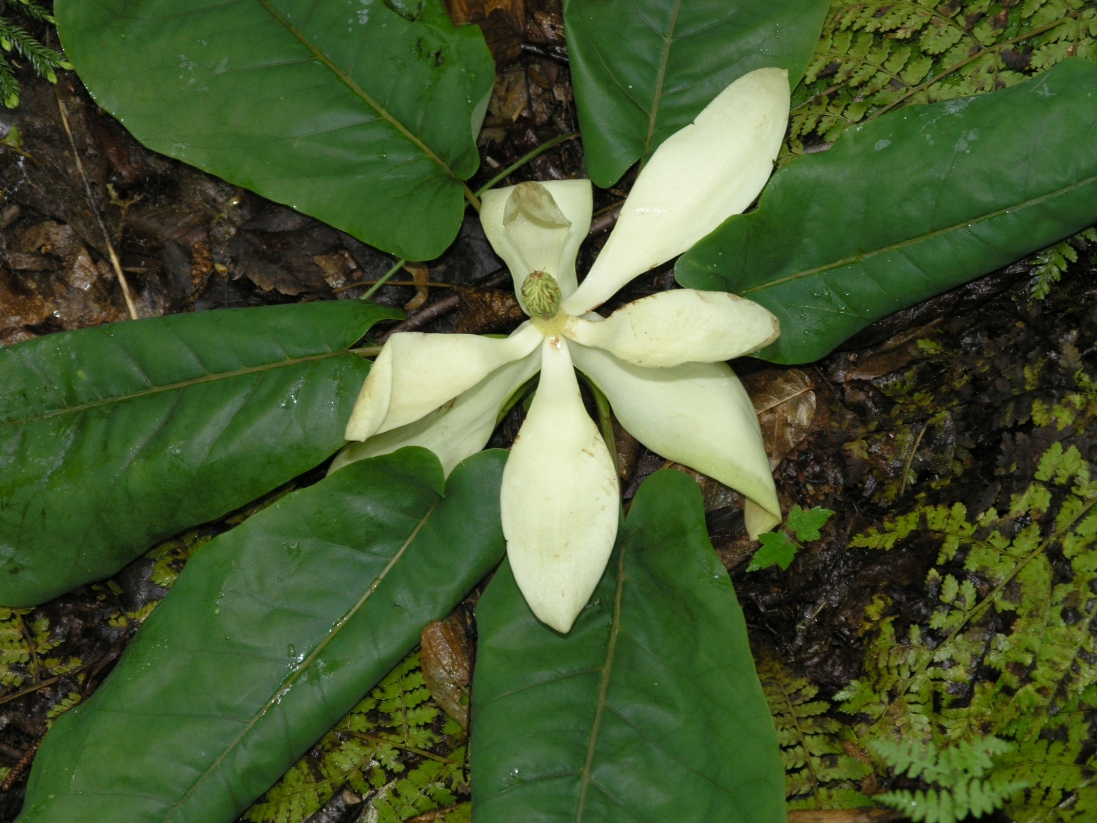
M. fraseri flower and foliage.

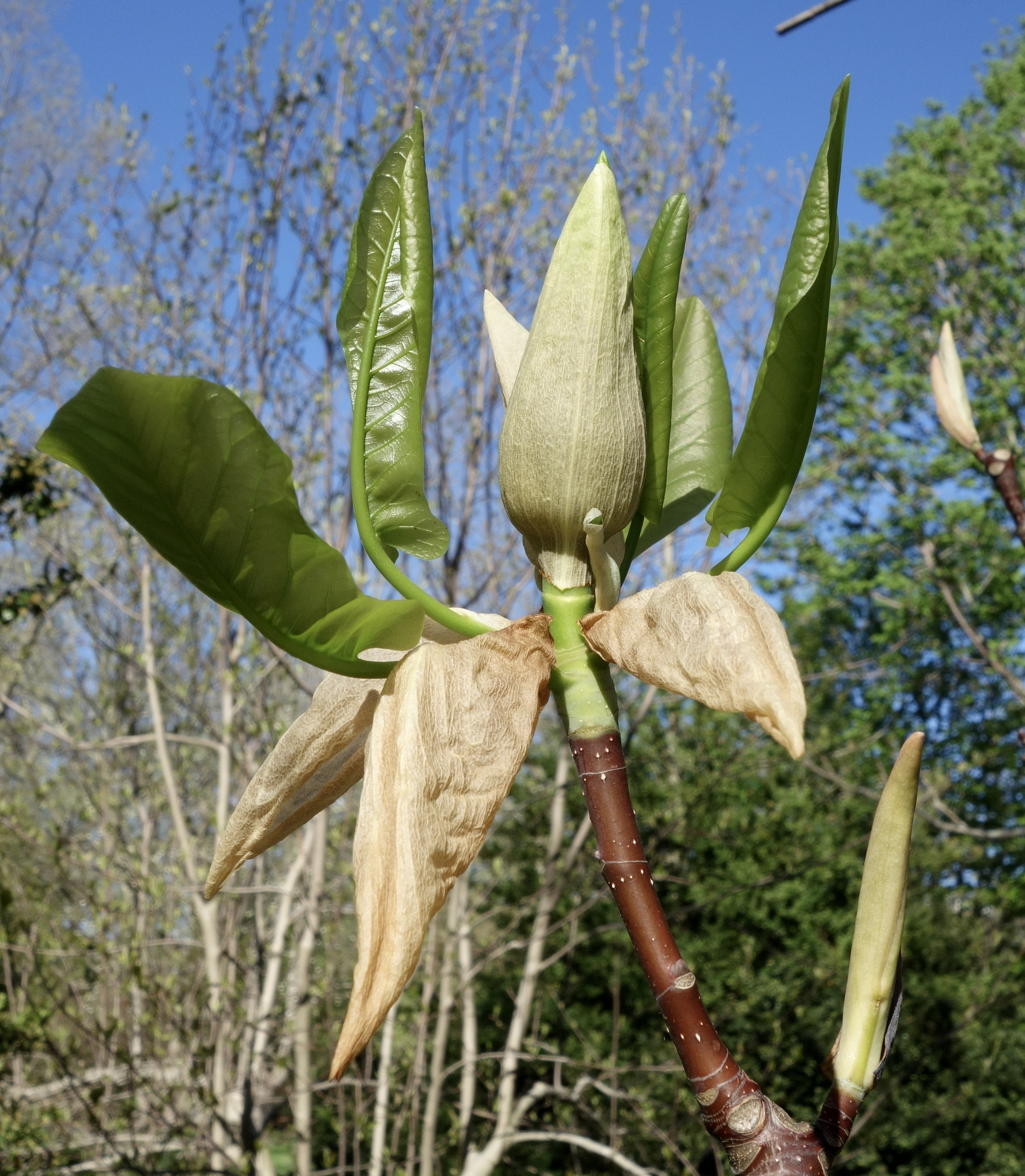
Magnolia fraseri flower bud and emerging leaves.

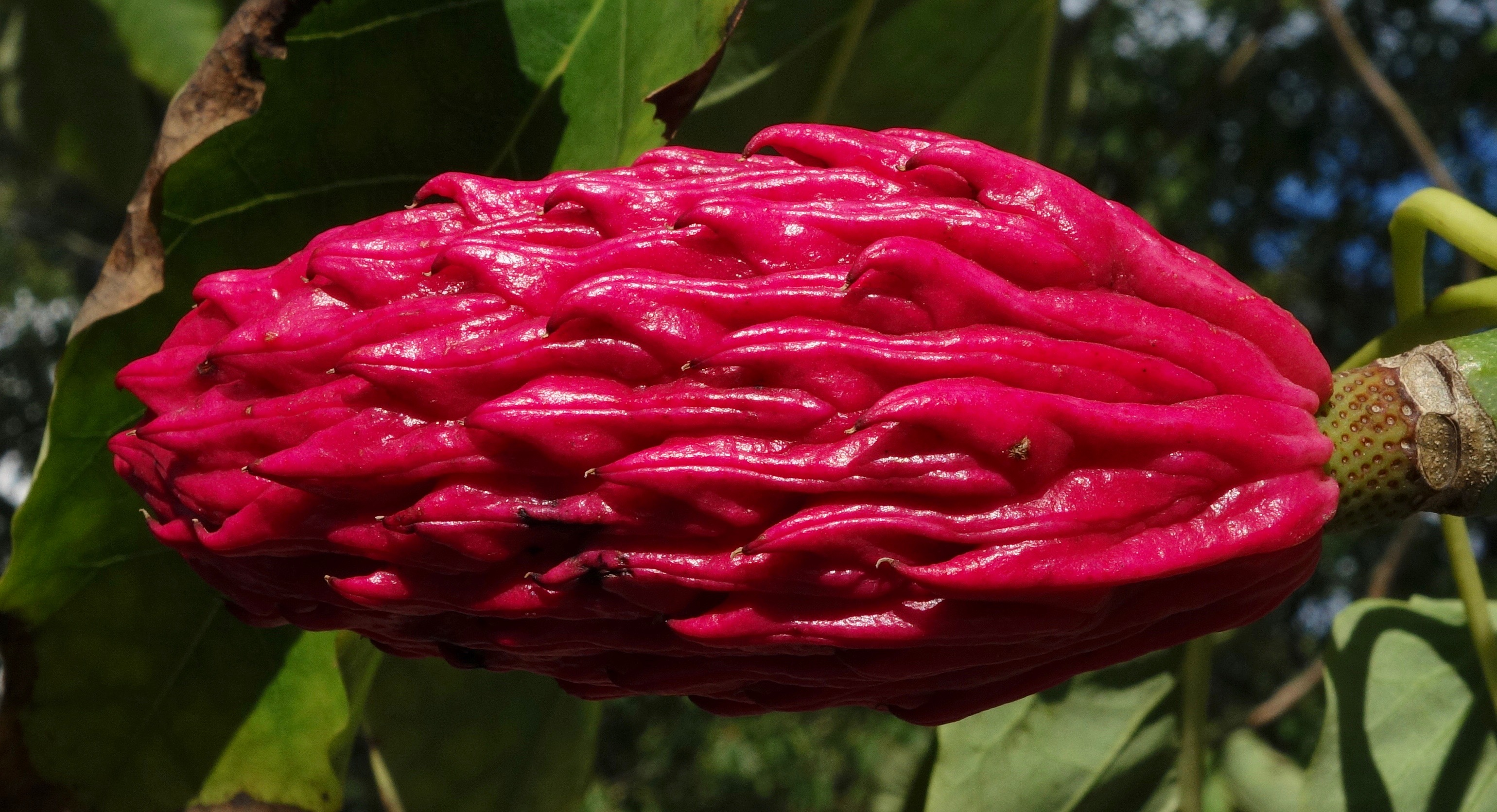
Magnolia fraseri maturing fruit.

== Notes and references ==
- Hunt, D., ed. (1998). Magnolias and their allies. International Dendrology Society & Magnolia Society. ISBN 0-9517234-8-0.
- Sternberg, G. (2004). Native Trees for North American Landscapes pp. 264. Timber Press, Inc.
