= John Frazier (disambiguation) =

John Frazier (born 1944) is an American visual effects supervisor.

John Frazier may also refer to:

- John A. Frazier (1833–1899), American merchant seaman
- John Linley Frazier (1946–2009), American mass murderer
- John Frazier (politician) (born 1945), American politician

== See also ==
- John Fraser
- John Frazer
