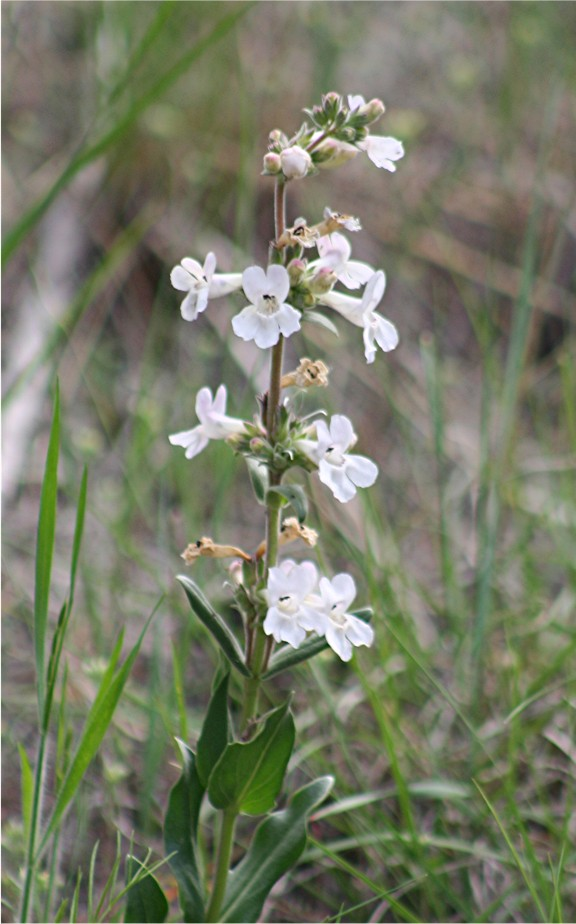

Conservation status
- Secure (NatureServe)

Scientific classification
- Kingdom: Plantae
- Clade: Tracheophytes
- Clade: Angiosperms
- Clade: Eudicots
- Clade: Asterids
- Order: Lamiales
- Family: Plantaginaceae
- Genus: Penstemon
- Species: P. albidus

Binomial name
- Penstemon albidus Nutt.

Synonyms
- Chelone albida Sprengel; Penstemon teretiflorus Fraser ex Nutt.; Penstemon viscidulus Nees

= Penstemon albidus =

Species of flowering plant

Penstemon albidus, commonly known as white penstemon, white-flower beardtongue, or Red-Line Beardtongue is a very widespread perennial flower of the mixed-grass and shortgrass prairies. Its natural distribution is from Manitoba and Alberta in Canada to Texas and New Mexico in the United States. The bright white flowers for which it are named are quite attractive to both bees and hummingbird moths.

== Description ==
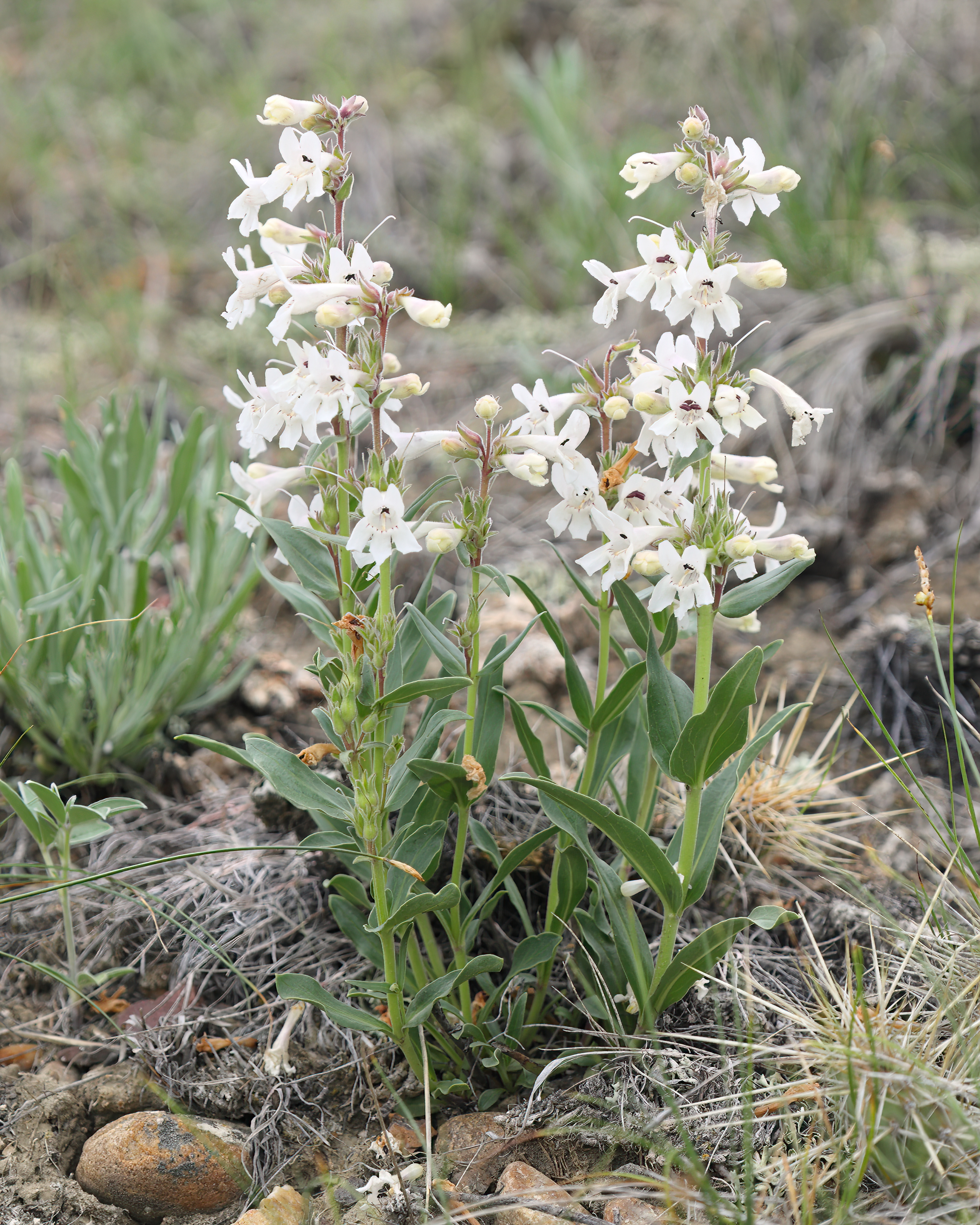
Penstemon albidus in flower, Grasslands National Park, Saskatchewan, Canada

Penstemon albidus is a long lived herbaceous plant that most often blooms sometime from April to June. The flowering stems are 8–60 cm in height, but more typically 15–50 cm and stand upright with only a slight curve at the base. The stems are covered in extremely fine and short hairs that increase to being glandular and hairy closer to the buds and flowers. Plants can have multiple flowering stems or just one.

The basal leaves are attached with short stems to the base of the plant and vary in shape from lanceolate to obovate. They are usually 20–90 mm long and 7–20 mm wide, though occasionally they will be as long as 110 mm or as narrow as 4 mm. The leaves have various textures, from smooth to quite rough with short tough hairs (scabrous), but are not leathery. The leaf edges also vary from plant to plant from smooth, through slightly serrate, to distinctly serrate. The 2–6 leaves on the flowering stems are similar in shape to the basal leaves and grow as opposite pairs. They tend to be shorter (25–65 mm long and 3–21 mm wide) and clasp the flowering stem instead of growing on short leaf stems, especially on the upper leaves of the flowering stem. The leaves and flowering stems grow from a short, branched, persistent stem called a caudex. Underground Penstemon albidus has a taproot with fibrous lateral roots. When top parts of the plant are damaged it activates regrowth shoots from the crown.

The inflorescence is a thyrse with flowers blooming in succession from bottom to top as it grows, the portion with flowers being 4–25 cm long and occasionally as long as 30 cm. The stems have a cylindrical cross section and are densely glandular-pubescent. There will be 2–10 groups of flowers on short stems attaching to the main stem (verticillasters). Close examination will show that each group on the stem is subdivided into a pair of attachment points with each having 2–7 flowers. The bracts close to each flowering group are pointed and narrow (lanceolate) 17–65 mm long and 3–17 mm wide. The short pedicels supporting each flower are also densely glandular and hairy as is the flowering stem (peduncles).

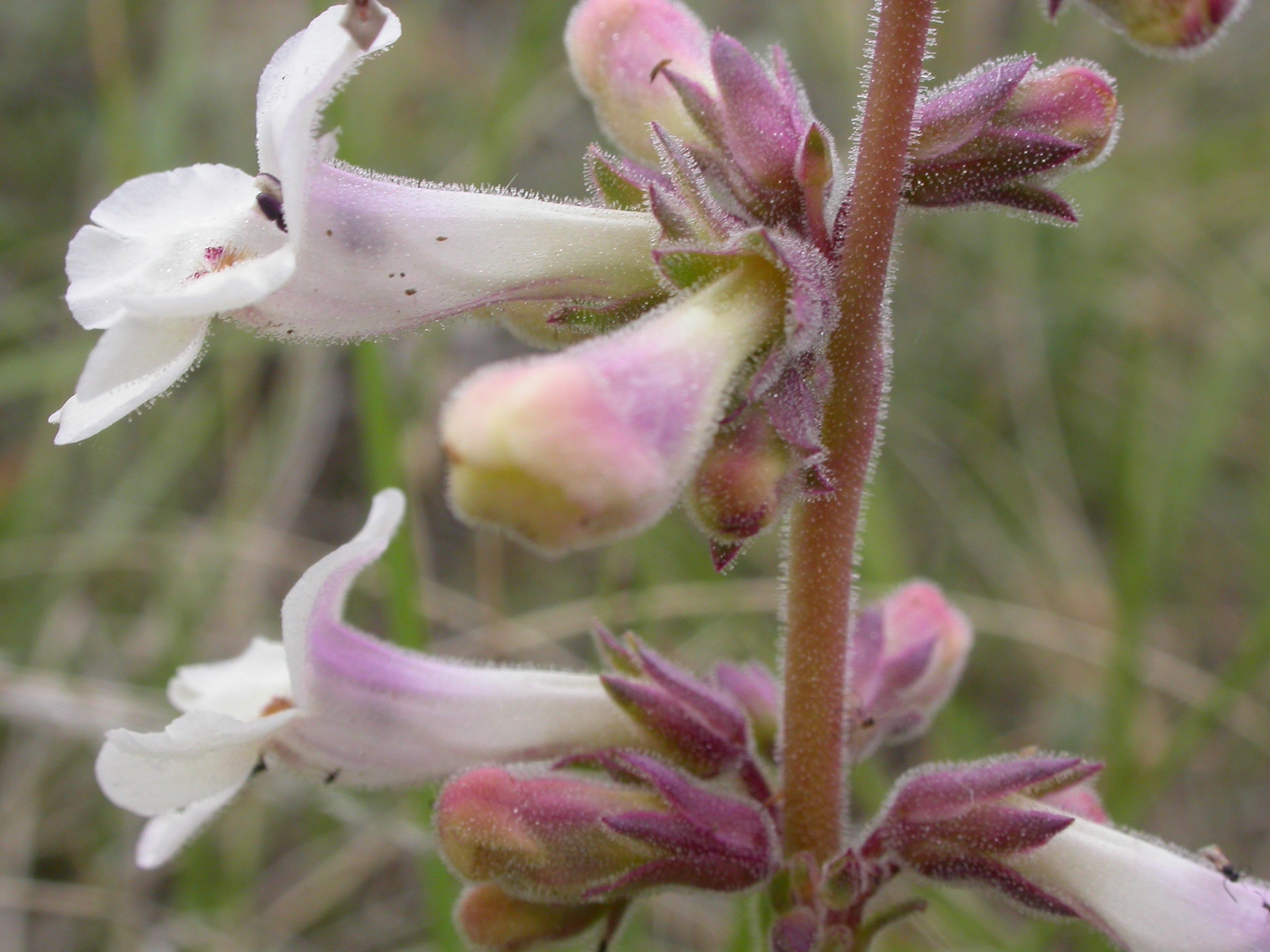
Flowers of Penstemon albidus showing hairy glandular stems and sepals

The flowers of Penstemon albidus have sepals (calyx lobes) that are 4–7 mm long, 1.5–3 mm wide, pointed, and also covered in glandular hairs. The flower is white, occasionally tinged with a delicate shades of lavender, blue, or pink, possibly due to crossbreeding with other species. The flowers often have nectar guides extending from the mouth of the flowers down the lower interior of the flower tube toward the back that are red or magenta, often quite dark in contrast with the rest of the flower. The overall shape of the flower is a funnel 12–20 mm in length and 6–8 mm in diameter. The tube of the flower is not constricted at the opening and 4–6 mm long and 6–8 mm in diameter. Internally it is also glandular pubescent. In the sunlight the edges of its flowers will glisten slightly due the numerous hairs. P. albidus tends to have larger flowers in the north of its range than in the south of its range.

The stamens are kept within the flower tube and have black flattened and spread out anther sacs. Each pollen sac is 0.1–1.1 mm in size and opens completely. The staminode is 8–9 mm long, but does not extend beyond the throat of the flower, and is sparsely to moderately covered in shaggy yellow hairs 1 mm long the end approaching the flower's mouth. The staminode can be either straight or recurved. The style is generally 9–11 mm in length, but occasionally is as long as 13 mm.

Depending on altitude and weather conditions flowering will occur for 16 to 42 days starting in April to the end of July and rarely as late as September. The botanist Francis Pennell noted that the flowers are very fragrant at dusk when being visited by moths.

The seed capsules are small drop shapes about 8–12 mm long and 4–7 mm in diameter. The seeds are black to dark brown in color and 2–3 mm in size.

== Taxonomy ==
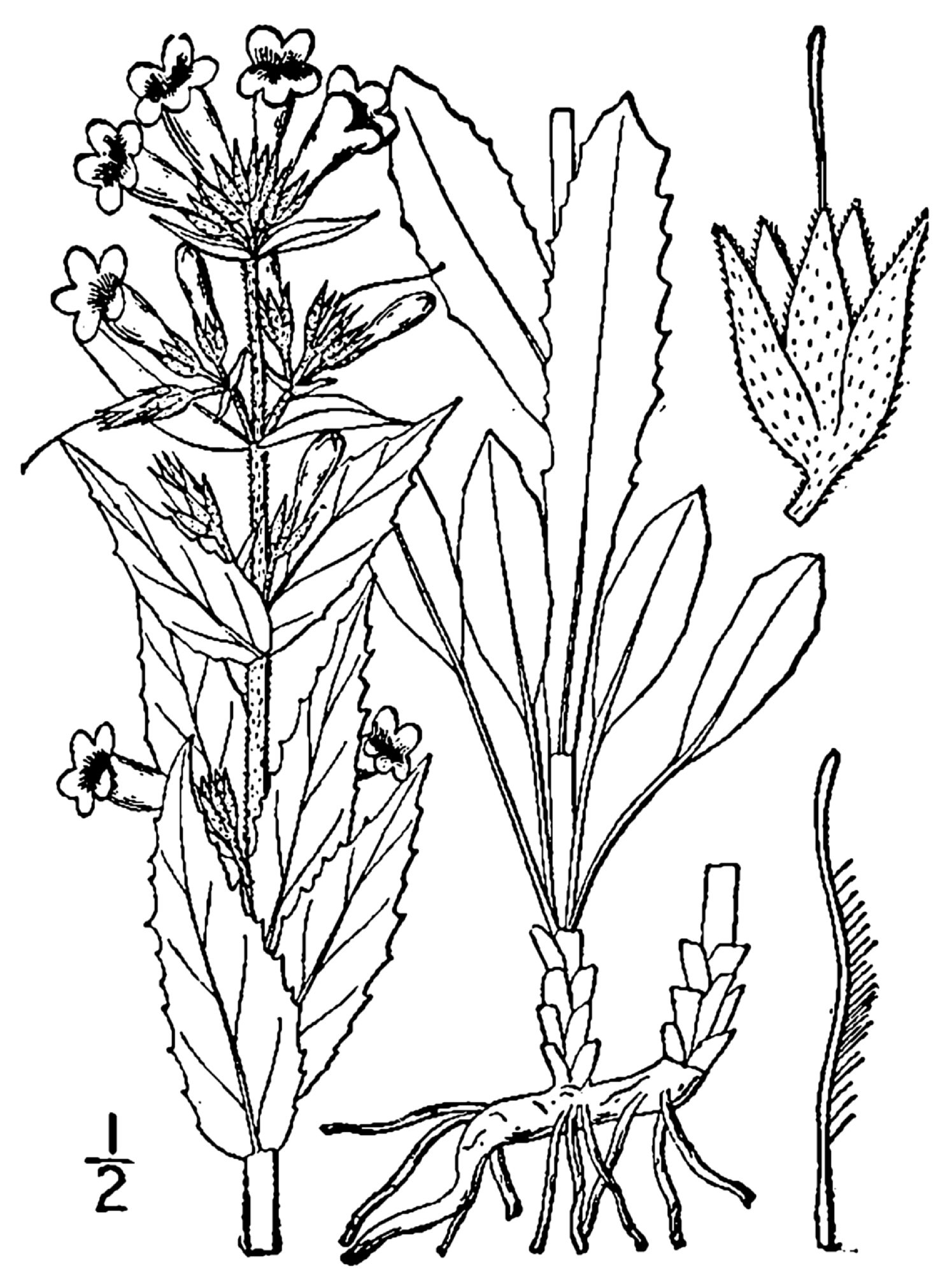
Penstemon albidus from An Illustrated Flora of the Northern United States, Canada and the British Possessions, 1913

The type specimen of Penstemon albidus was collected in 1811 by Thomas Nuttall, "On the plains of the Missouri [River], common, from the confluence of the river Platte to the Mountains". It was described and named by him as Pentstemon albidum, using the mistaken Linnaean correction of John Mitchell's Penstemon and albidus from the Latin meaning 'somewhat white'. During the botanist John Fraser's 1807 trip to the United States he collected specimens and seeds for a plant he called Penstemon teretiflorus. This was listed in Catalogue of New and Interesting Plants Collected in Upper Louisiana, a book generally accepted as being written by Nuttall and published in 1813. However, it is accepted that this was in fact P. albidus more correctly described by Nuttall in 1817.

Up until the year 1828 plants in Penstemon were sometimes classified as Chelone, as Kurt Sprengel did in 1825 when he described Penstemon albidus as Chelone albida in Systema Vegetabilium. The German botanist Christian Nees von Esenbeck described it as Penstemon viscidulus in 1821 and this later identification was not definitively resolved until David D. Keck published his paper Studies in Penstemon VI in 1938.

Table of Synonyms
Name	Year	Notes
Chelone albida (Nutt.) Spreng.	1825	≡ hom.
Penstemon teretiflorus Fraser ex Nutt.	1818	= het.
Penstemon viscidulus Nees	1821	= het.
Notes: ≡ homotypic synonym; = heterotypic synonym

The chromosome number for Penstemon albidus is 16 in diploid individuals.

== Habitat and Distribution ==
Penstemon albidus is commonly found growing in silty, sandy loam, or gravelly soils. and they can be found grow from 300 to 1800 m in elevation. Its main habitat is open, dry prairies, but it also grows in juniper savannas in Colorado.

Penstemon albidus is one of the widely distributed members of its genus, being native almost the entirety in the western great plains of North America. In the south it grows in north of West Texas and the Texas Panhandle. They also grow in the northeast of New Mexico and the west of Oklahoma and its panhandle. The range continues north into the western half of Kansas and the eastern plains of Colorado. The USDA Natural Resources Conservation Service PLANTS database (PLANTS) likewise records it throughout most of Nebraska and three of the westernmost counties of Iowa. White penstemons grow in the western third of Wyoming and almost all of Montana including valleys in the foothills of its mountains. It grows throughout North Dakota, much of South Dakota, and the western counties of Minnesota. In Canada its natural range is restricted to the southern portions of Alberta, Manitoba, and Saskatchewan, with the reported occurrences in Ontario suspected by Flora of North America to be introduced.

=== Conservation ===
In 2016 NatureServe evaluated Penstemon albidus was evaluated as globally secure (G5), meaning it has no major threats and is widespread and abundant. At the state and provincial level they also found it to be secure (S5) in the state of Kansas. It was deemed to be apparently secure (S4) in Montana, Saskatchewan, and Wyoming. It was given the status of vulnerable (S3) in Alberta and Manitoba and was more threatened in Iowa where it is imperiled (S2). They have not evaluated the rest of its range at the state level.

== Ecology ==
The above ground growth of P. albidus is rarely eaten by grazing livestock. It increases in population in areas with grazing compared to nongrazed land, with the greatest increase when areas are grazed intensively twice a season rather than being constantly grazed. It is not competitive with other plants in the dry prairies and does not form clumps or invade new areas. Generally they are restricted to relatively virgin prairie areas that have not been plowed or mowed and are difficult to reestablish once removed from a landscape. P. albidus also only rarely makes up part of the diet of grasshoppers, with only Melanoplus confusus and Melanoplus foedus recorded as feeding on it 3% and 1% of the time respectively. It is a common flower in its range, but does not form uniform stands or typically make up the majority of the plants in an area.

== Cultivation ==
White penstemons are durable and long-lived in garden conditions, giving a good show of flowers early in the summer, however the leaves are not noticeable or showy. Indeed, it was one of the first penstemon seeds offered for sale in Europe by John Fraser in 1813, though it is not much grown there in the 21st century. In garden settings they are adapted to full sun and neutral to somewhat alkaline soils. They are adapted to sandy loam, sand, or gravelly soils and require either largely dry soils or very well drained conditions.

Seed for cultivation are collected in April–July when they have darkened in color. Their seeds require cold and moist stratification of eight weeks to sprout or to be planted outside over the winter. The coldest USDA hardiness zones where this plant is known to survive is zone 3.

== See also ==
- List of Penstemon species

== Gallery ==
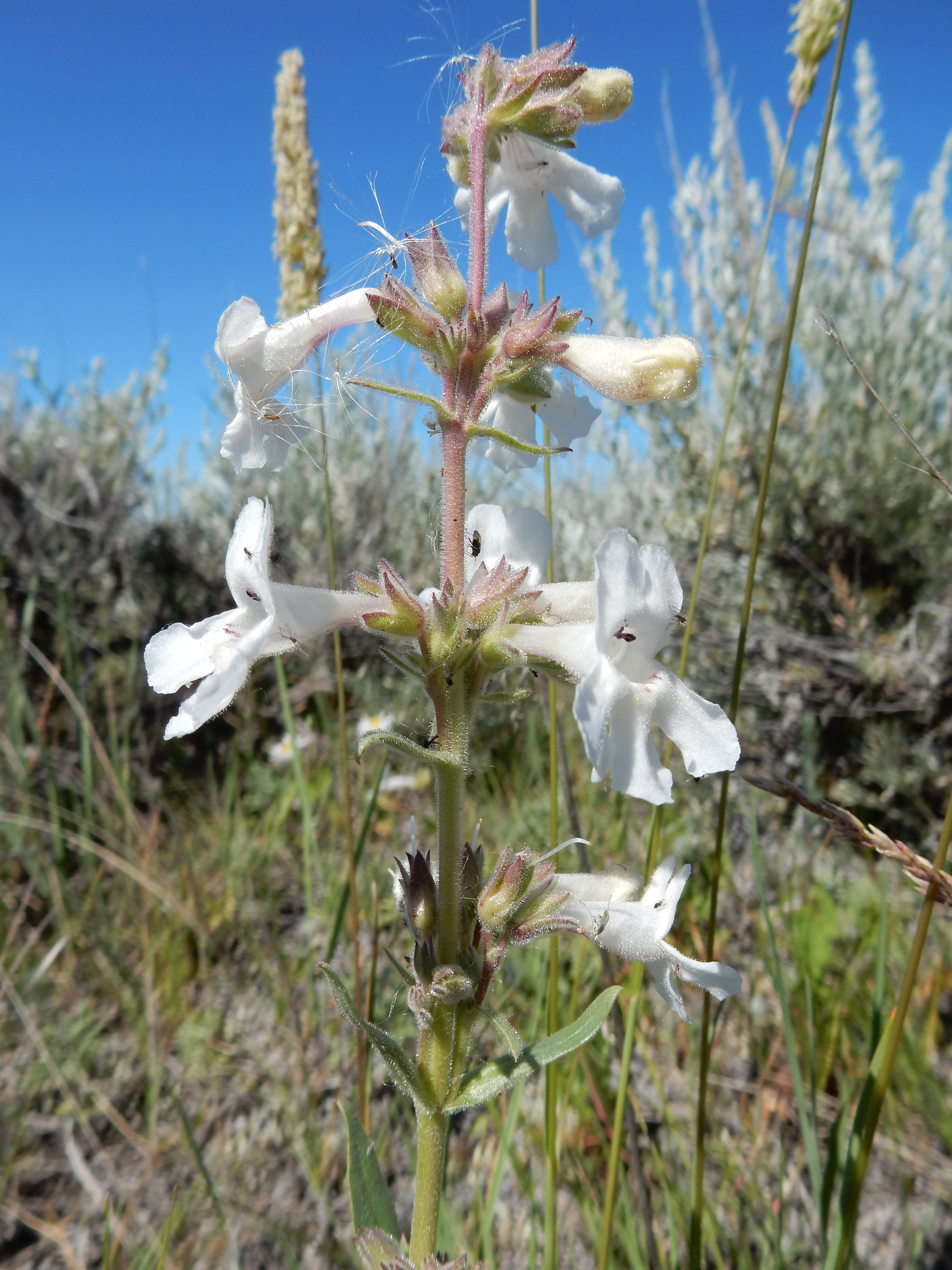
Penstemon albidus in sagebrush steppe in eastern Montana, 6 June 2016

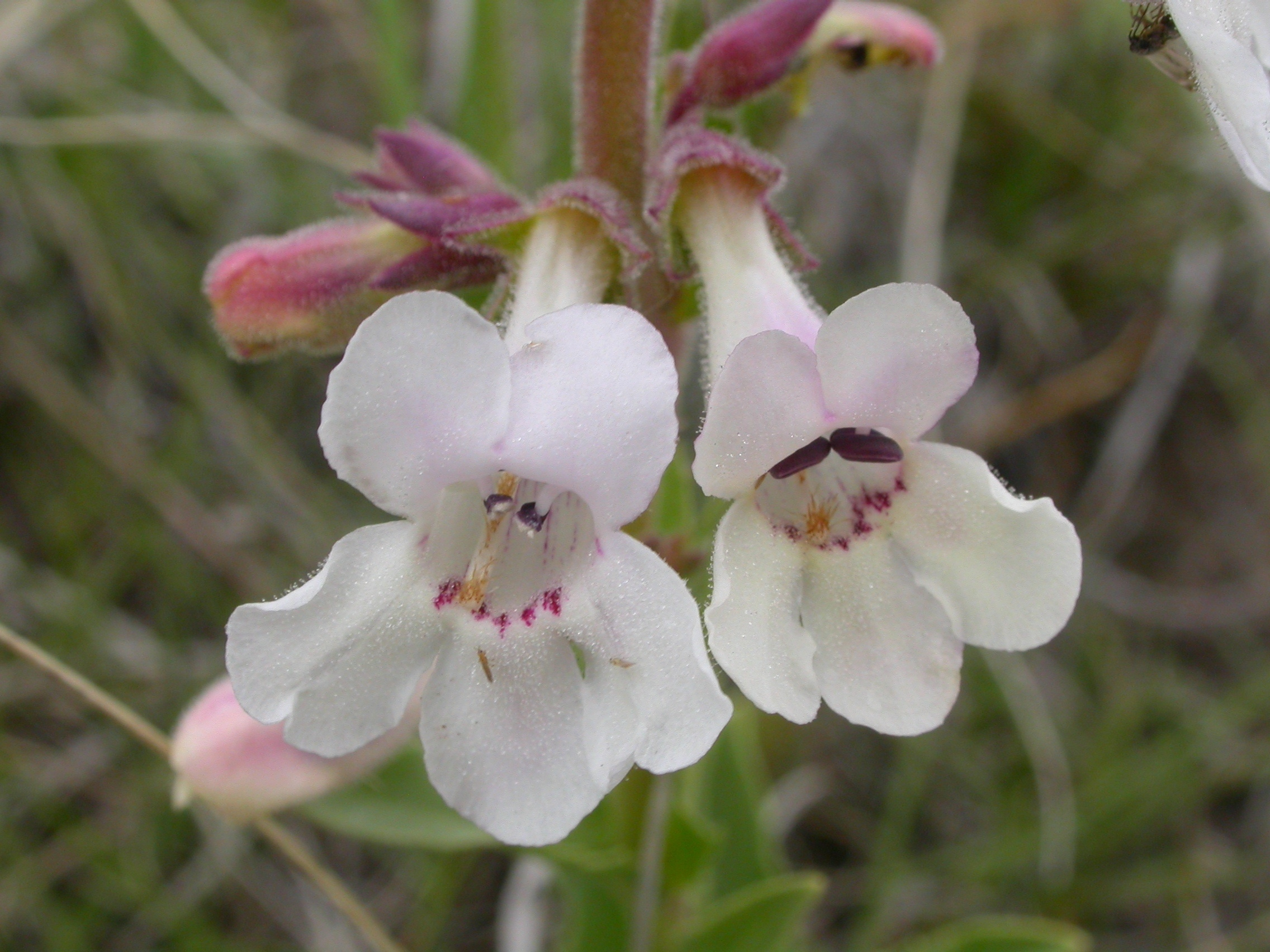
Close up of Penstemon albidus, 7 June 2005

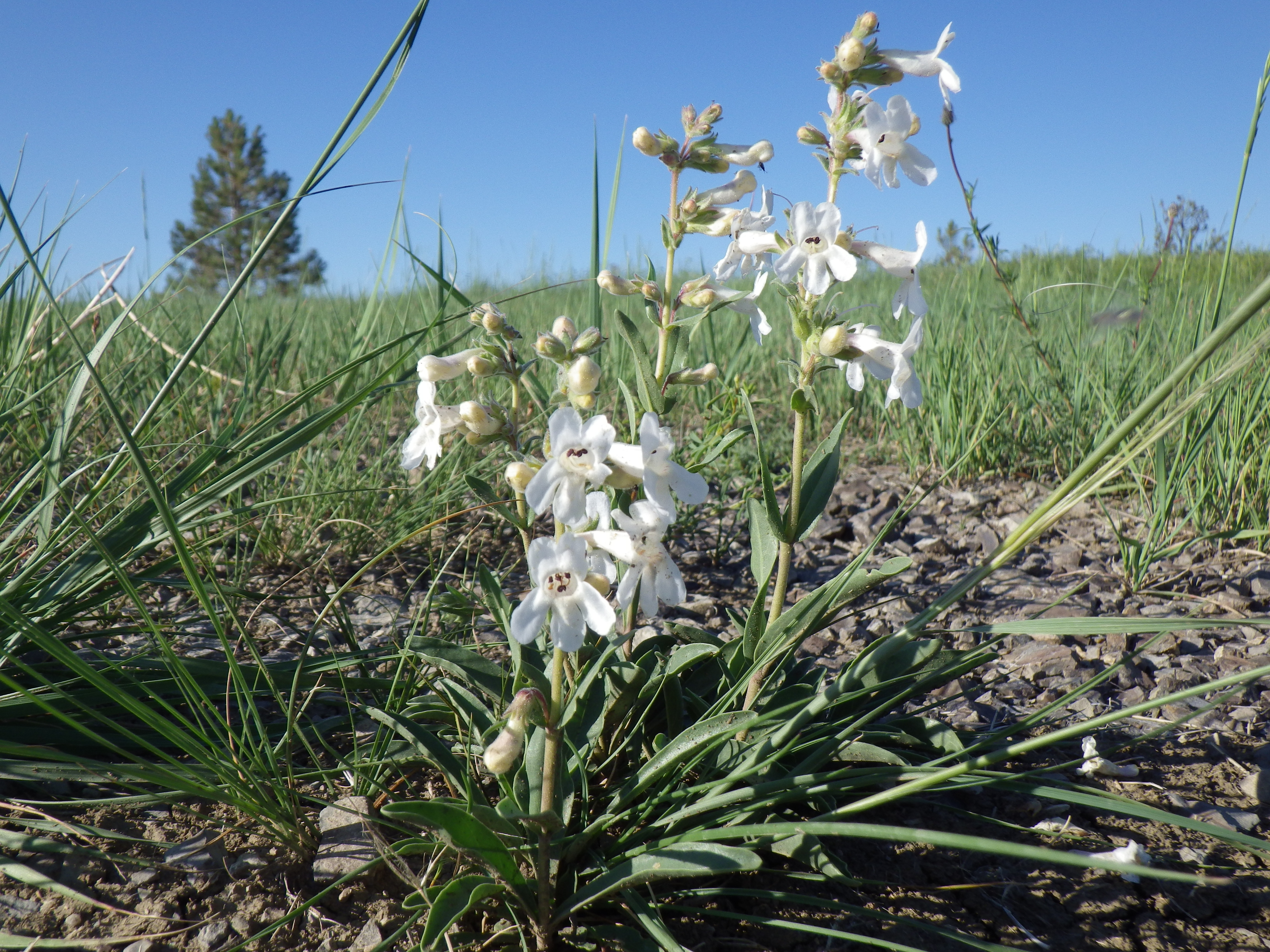
Short specimen Penstemon albidus, 12 June 2012

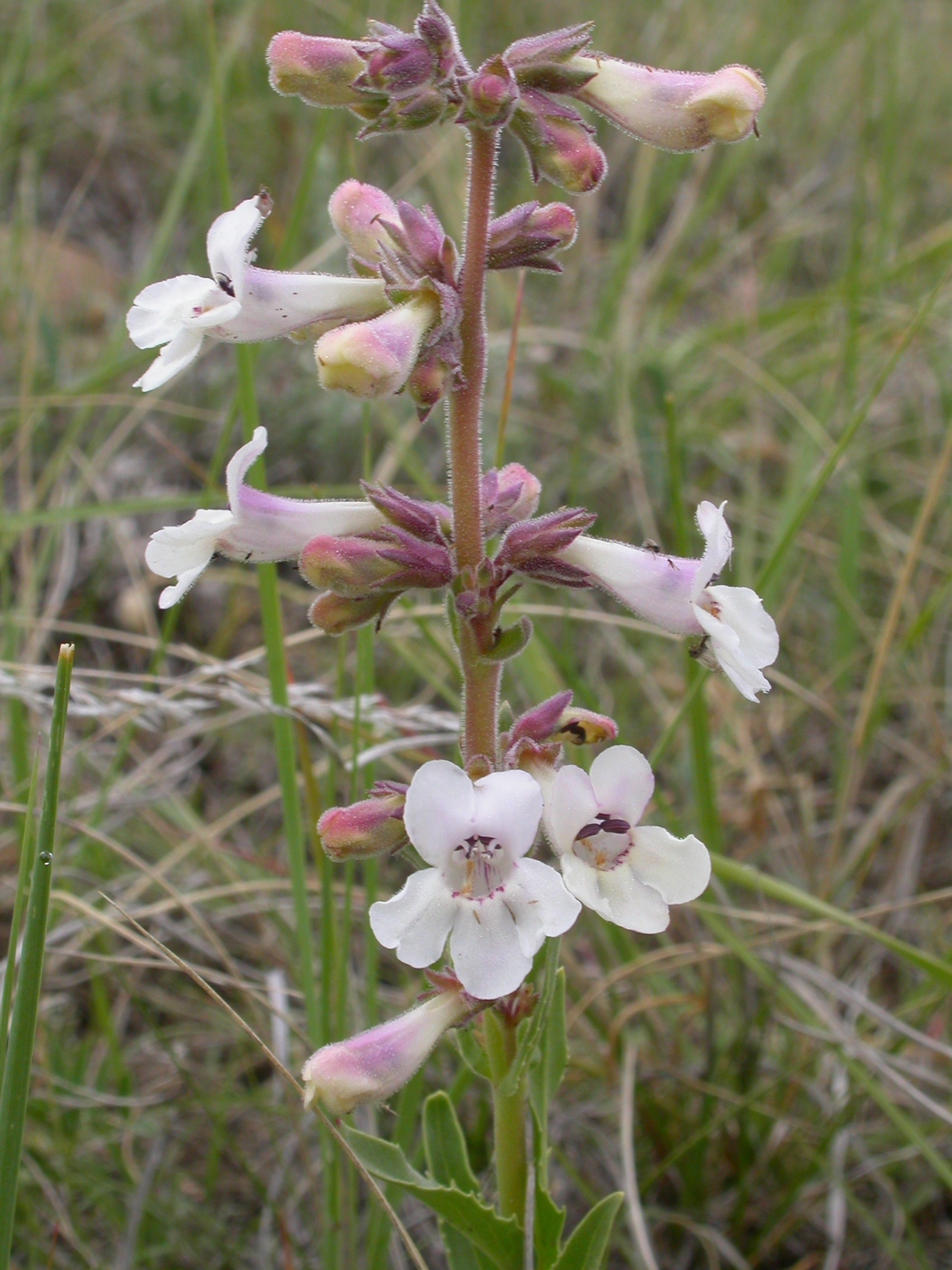
The flowering stem of Penstemon albidus 7 June 2005

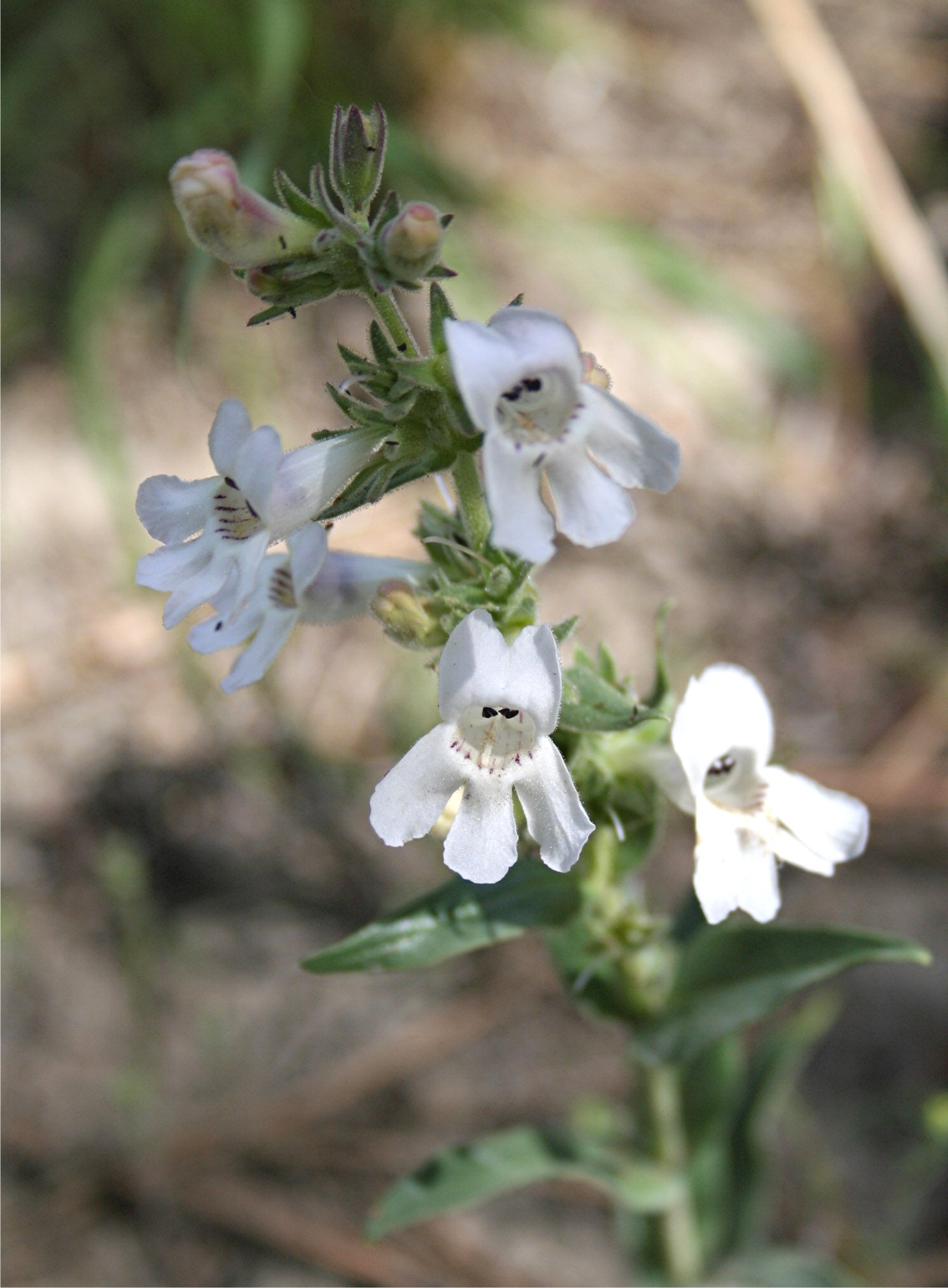
Penstemon albidus, white penstemon. Near Columbus, Montana. 4 June 2006

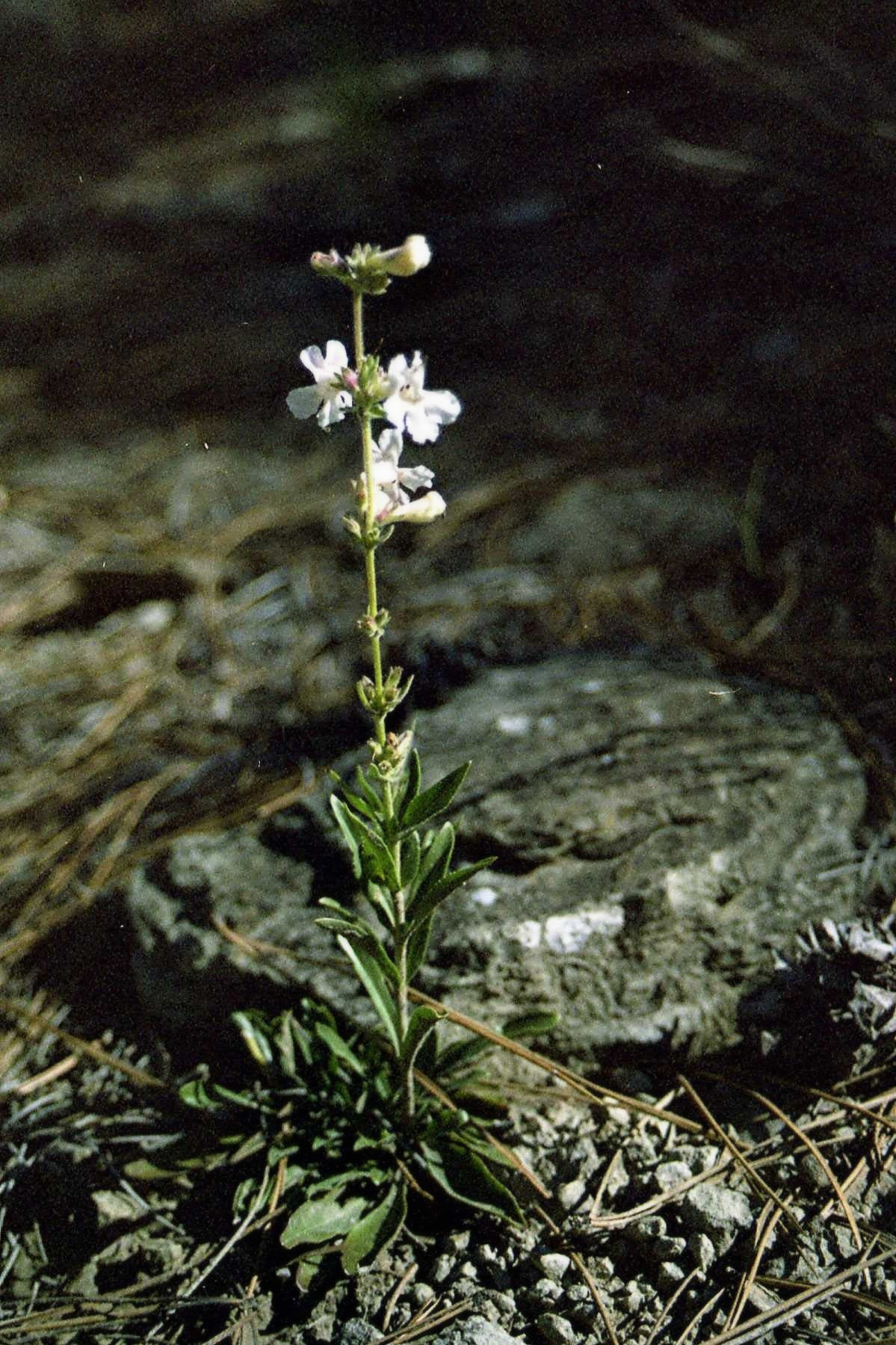
Penstemon albidus, white penstemon. Near Columbus, Montana. 4 June 2006
