= John Fraser (poet, died 1849) =

Irish poet born circa 1809

- Born: 1809
- Died: 1849 (aged 39–40)
- Writing career
- Genre: Poetry

John Fraser or John Frazer (c.1809–1849) was an Irish poet.

Fraser was born at Birr, King's County, about 1809. He was by occupation a cabinet-maker, but employed his leisure in literary studies. He wrote, under the pen name J. de Dean, a considerable quantity of sentimental and patriotic verse.

He died in Dublin in 1849.
