= John MacLeod Fraser =

Canadian diplomat

John MacLeod Fraser (February 12, 1935 – December 29, 2010) was ambassador of Canada to the People's Republic of China from January 11, 1971 to June 10, 1971.
