= John Fraser (writer, born 1939) =

English professor, novelist, and poet

John Fraser (born 1939) is an English professor, novelist, and poet.

== Academic career ==
He was born in London and educated at St Paul's School, Sidney Sussex College, Cambridge, King's College, London and the University of Leicester. He taught History in 1961–66 at the Cambridgeshire College of Arts & Technology, Cambridge, then Political Science at the University of Leicester (1967–68). From 1968 to 1971 he was assistant professor, then acting chairman, Department of Political Science, Laurentian University, Ontario, Canada. From 1971 to 1984 he was assistant professor, then associate professor, Department of Political Science, University of Waterloo, Ontario, Canada. Between 1978 and 2001 he had several contract professorships at the University of Rome and University of Ferrara; and from 1986 to 2003 he was visiting research fellow at the University of Reading.

Fraser's academic publications include works in both Italian and English, such as An Introduction to the Thought of Galvano della Volpe, Lawrence & Wishart, London, 1977 (transl. into Italian as: Il Pensiero di Galvano della Volpe, Liguori, Napoli, 1979), and Italy: Society in Crisis / Society in Transformation (Routledge & Kegan Paul, London, 1981). Fraser's literary work (novels, novellas, short stories and poetry) includes Black Masks (short stories and poetry), The Magnificent Wurlitzer, Medusa, The Observatory, The Other Shore, The Red Tank, Runners, Blue Light, Hard Places, An Illusion of Sun, Soft Landing, Military Roads, The Storm, Wayfaring, The Case, Enterprising Women, Down from the Stars and Animal Tales. His work on Galvano della Volpe has been considered expert testimony in studies of Volpe's life. He has also been considered to be an authority on Marxism.

== Reception of fiction writing ==
As a fiction writer, Fraser has a unique free-flowing signature style. The Fellow Emeritus at Magdalen College, Oxford John Fuller comments:

A serious novelist from the beginning. I have always been tremendously impressed by both the conceptual depth and the fey fantasy of all that he does – not to mention the politics […] In Fraser’s fiction the reader rides as on a switchback or luge of impetuous attention, with effects flashing by at virtuoso speeds. The characters seem to be unwitting agents of chaos, however much wise reflection Fraser bestows upon them; they move with shrugging self-assurance through circumstances as richly detailed and as without reliable compass-points as a Chinese scroll.

== Bibliography of original works ==
=== Poetry ===
- Gianicolo/Janiculum (Lupo, Roma, 1983)
- Black Masks (AESOP Modern, Oxford, 2009)

=== Fiction ===
- An Illusion of Sun (AESOP Modern, Oxford, 1958; 2010)
- The Observatory (AESOP Modern, Oxford, 1967; 2010)
- The Other Shore (AESOP Modern, Oxford, 1971; 2010)
- Black Masks (AESOP Modern, Oxford, 1984; 2009)
- The Magnificent Wurlitzer (AESOP Modern, Oxford, 1990; 2009)
- Medusa (AESOP Modern, Oxford, 2010)
- The Red Tank (AESOP Modern, Oxford, 2010)
- Runners (AESOP Modern, Oxford, 2010)
- Blue Light (AESOP Modern, Oxford, 2011)
- Hard Places (AESOP Modern, Oxford, 2011)
- Soft Landing (AESOP Modern, Oxford, 2011)
- Military Roads (AESOP Modern, Oxford, 2012)
- The Storm (AESOP Modern, Oxford, 2012)
- Wayfaring (AESOP Modern, Oxford, 2012)
- The Case (AESOP Modern, Oxford, 2012)
- Enterprising Women (AESOP Modern, Oxford, 2013)
- Down from the Stars (AESOP Modern, Oxford, 2013)
- Animal Tales (AESOP Modern, Oxford, 2014)
- Three Beauties (AESOP Modern, Oxford, 2015)
- Thirty Years (AESOP Modern, Oxford, 2016)
- The Red Bird (AESOP Modern, Oxford, 2016)
- Happy Always (AESOP Modern, Oxford, 2016)
- Sisters (AESOP Modern, Oxford, 2017)
- Short Lives (AESOP Modern, Oxford, 2017)
- S (AESOP Modern, Oxford, 2018)
- The Answer (AESOP Modern, Oxford, 2018)
- Tomorrow the Victory (AESOP Modern, Oxford, 2018)
- People You Will Never Meet (AESOP Modern, Oxford, 2019)
- Confessions (AESOP Modern, Oxford, 2019)

=== Political theory ===
- An Introduction to the Thought of Galvano della Volpe (Lawrence & Wishart, London, 1977)
- L'Intellettuale Amministrativo nella Politica del PCI (Liguori, Napoli, 1977)
- Italy: Society in Crisis / Society in Transformation (Routledge & Kegan Paul, London, 1981)
- PCI e Intellettuali a Bologna (con un'Introduzione di Franco Ferrarotti) (Liguori, Napoli, 1982)
- Comunità contro Società? Il Ritorno alla Comunità e la Ricerca dei Fondamenti della Socialità (La Goliardica, Roma, 1987)
- Il tempo dei giovani (with A. Zanotti and U. Wienand) (Comune di Ferrara, 1991)

=== Translations ===
- Rousseau and Marx (Galvano della Volpe) (Lawrence & Wishart, London, 1978)
- Gramsci and the Party: The Prison Years (Paolo Spriano) (Lawrence & Wishart, London, 1979)
- Max Weber and the Destiny of Reason (Franco Ferrarotti) (M.E. Sharpe, New York, 1982)
