= John R. Fraser =

Canadian physician

Professor John R. Fraser FRCOG
- Born: 1890
- Died: 1951 (aged 60–61)
- Occupation: Professor of surgery

John R. Fraser FRCOG (1890-1959) was a physician on the staff of the Obstetric and Gynaecological Department at McGill and in 1929, professor, chairman and head of department at McGill and Royal Victoria Hospital.

== Biography ==
During the First World War he served with the Canadian Army reaching the rank of major before he was decommissioned in 1919. He was a founding fellow of the Royal College of Obstetricians and Gynaecologists.

In 1936, whilst head of Obstetrics and gynaecology at McGill, Fraser met W. A. Scott, head of Obstetrics and gynaecology at the University of Toronto. This meeting gave opportunity for their juniors to meet. This younger generation of surgeon had grievances with the medical system that excluded younger surgeons from taking on major surgical cases, and in a "rebellious" decision conspired and established the Canadian Gynaecological Society (CGS), also known as the Canadian Gynaecological Travel Club and the senior Travel Club. With the objective of uniting Toronto and McGill, the aim was to promote education and to exert influence on departmental activities. Fraser became an honorary member. Remote from the aspirations of the juniors, Fraser, along with other seniors, dominated the early meetings and as a consequence, the juniors decided to exclude department heads from membership.
