= John Fraser (botanist) =

Scottish botanist (1750-1811)

John Fraser FLS, F.R.H.S.
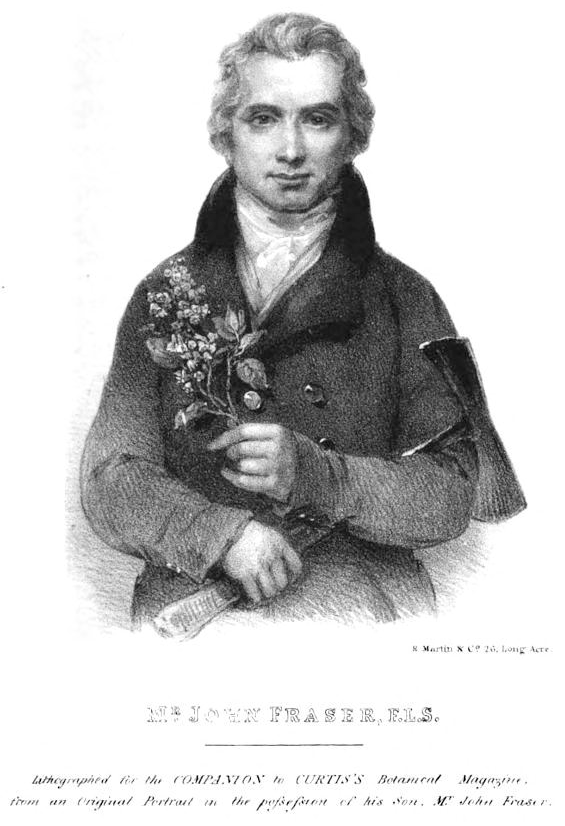
- John Fraser (lithograph of an 18th-century portrait)
- Born: 14 October 1750
- Died: 26 April 1811 (aged 60)
- Occupations: Botanist and plant collector
- Years active: 1780–1810
- Known for: Discovery and introduction of the flora of the Americas to Europe

John Fraser, FLS, F.R.H.S., (14 October 1750 – 26 April 1811) was a Scottish botanist who collected plant specimens around the world, from North America and the West Indies to Russia and points between, with his primary career activity from 1780 to 1810. Fraser was a commissioned plant collector for Catherine, Czar of Russia in 1795, Paul I of Russia in 1798, and for the Dowager Empress Maria Feodorovna in 1806; he issued nursery catalogues c. 1790 - 1796 and had an important herbarium that was eventually sold to the Linnean Society.

== Early life ==
Fraser was born during the Age of Enlightenment at Tomnacross, the Aird, Inverness-shire on 14 October 1750. His father was Donald Fraser, (a.k.a. Donald Down, a patronymic descriptive of hair colour traditional amongst the Scots Highlanders); his mother was Mary McLean, and his siblings included a brother James (b. 16 March 1753) and sister Christiana (b. 5 December 1756).

In 1770, five years before the American War of Independence and coincident with Captain James Cook's discovery of the eastern Australian coast, Fraser arrived in London as a young man to make his way in the city, at first following the trade of a hosier (a draper working with linen). He soon came to know the Chelsea Physic Garden, and it was through his visits there that he became inspired with a desire to advance horticulture in England. He married Frances Shaw on 21 June 1778 and settled down in a small shop in Paradise Bow, Chelsea.

== Starting out ==
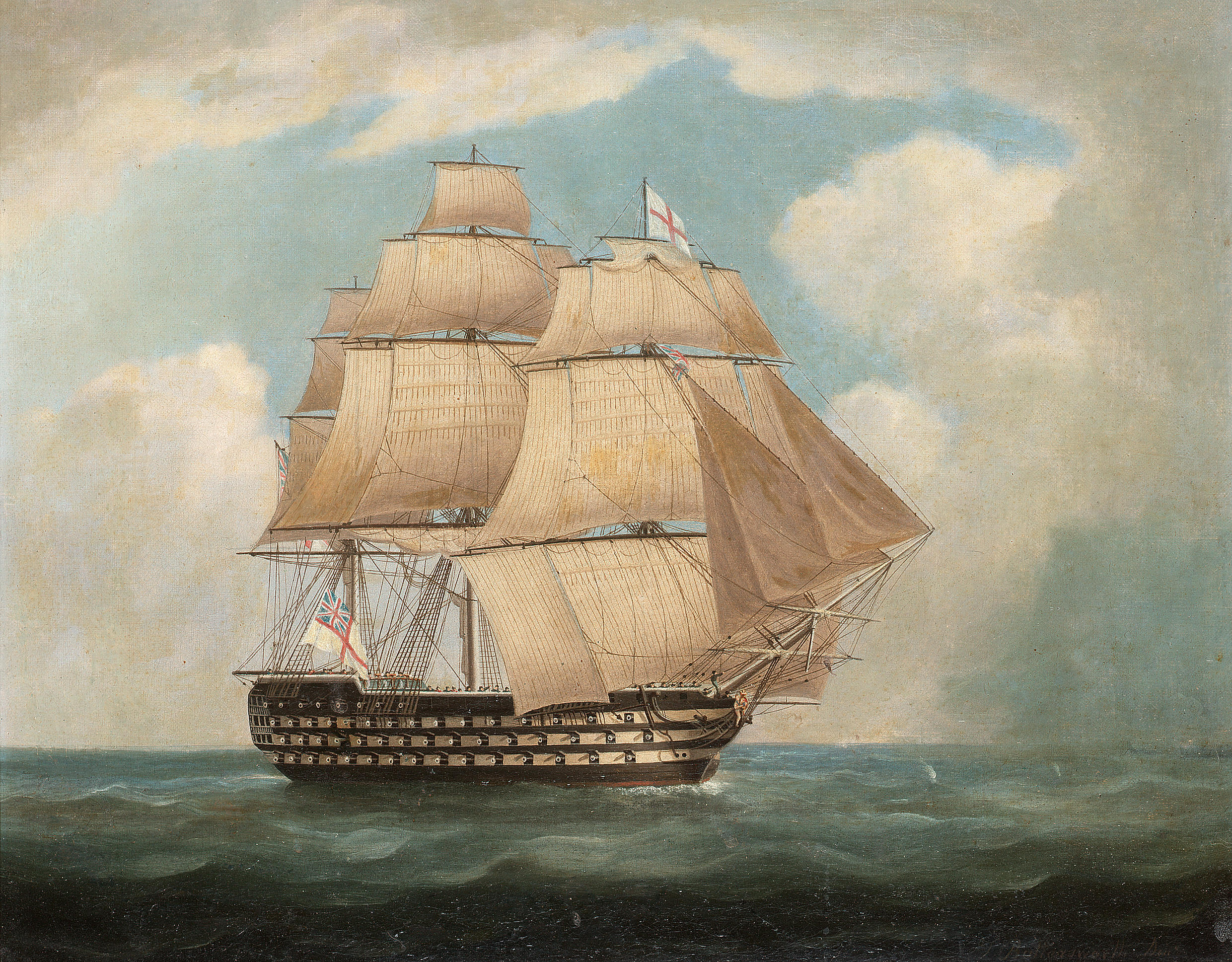
Campbell's ship H.M.S. Victory

Not long content with life in London, Fraser soon began to quit the mercantile counter as often as he could to watch the gardeners at work. He befriended William Forsyth, who at that time had charge of the Apothecaries' Garden; Through that acquaintance he would have become familiar with his predecessor Mark Catesby's travels, as some of Catesby's specimens from his travels were housed at the Chelsea Physic Garden, and Catesby's writings and engravings on the flora of the Americas were also published by the time Fraser moved to London.

Fraser took up botanical collecting and departed England for Newfoundland in 1780 with Admiral Campbell. Upon returning to England, he sailed again in 1783 to explore the New World with his eldest son John Jr. Fraser's early expeditions were financed by Forsyth, William Aiton of Kew Gardens, and James Edward Smith of the Linnean Society. In the 1780s, Fraser established the American Nursery at Sloane Square, King's Road. The nursery was on the east side of the Royal Military School and extended over 12 acres.

== Travels ==
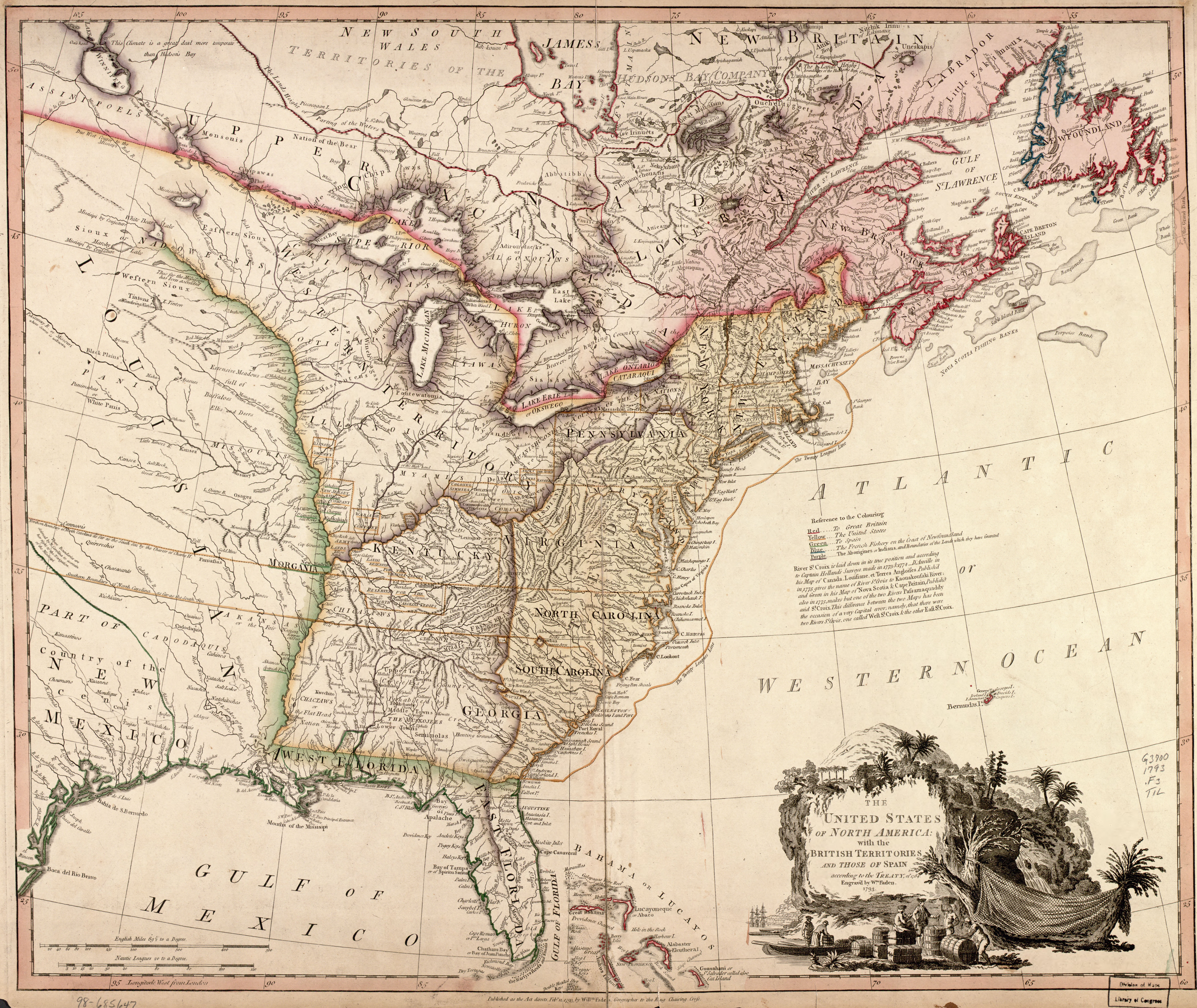
United States of North America (William Faden 1793)

As the 18th century came to a close, botanists who hunted plants afar were adventurers and explorers, John Fraser among them, fielding shipwrecks, sieges, slavery, pirates, escaped convicts and hostile natives. Fraser travelled extensively, from Scotland to England, the Americas, the West Indies, Russia, and points between. He began by collecting in Newfoundland from 1780 to 1783 or 1784, and then moved on to the Appalachian Mountains in eastern North America, all without the benefit of railroads or well-established highways. By the time he completed his journeys, Fraser had introduced about 220 distinct species of plants from the Americas to Europe and beyond.

=== Appalachia and the Alleghenies ===
Fraser made his first trip to the American South, and specifically to Charleston, South Carolina, in 1783 or 1784, sending home consignments of plants to Frank Thorburn of Old Brompton. Returning to England in 1785 with the expectation of recompense for his labour and risk, he was astonished to learn that all the valuable plants he had forwarded were dead, and the survivors, which were common, could not be disposed of. Vexed, Fraser subsequently entered into a lawsuit over the matter, a suit long and very expensive to both parties, but he sailed again for South Carolina in the autumn nonetheless.

On his return trip that autumn, he made his way north through Berkeley County to the Santee River, befriending Thomas Walter along the way. He continued on to the Piedmont region of the Appalachians, discovering Phlox stolonifera (Creeping Phlox) in Georgia along the southeastern edge of the Blue Ridge Mountains, and in 1787, he arrived in Pickens County near Chickamauga Cherokee land during the Cherokee–American wars. There, he collected what became known later as Magnolia fraseri. Fraser gave his contemporary William Bartram his original specimen of M. fraseri; the specimen is housed in the Walter Herbarium in the British Museum of Natural History collection. The Hortus Kewensis recorded 16 new plants as having been introduced by Fraser in 1786, and five more in 1787.

One of the most enterprising, indefatigable, and persevering men that ever embarked in the cause of botany and natural science.

— J. C. Loudon,
Botanical Magazine, 1838

Fraser trekked the Allegheny Mountains in 1789 when trans-Allegheny travel was limited to indigenous peoples' trails and one military trail, Braddock Road, built in 1751 and too far north of his journeys to be of help. He travelled with François André Michaux, and on the summit of the Great Roan was the first European to discover the Rhododendron catawbiense, now cultivated in many varieties. Of the rhododendrons he wrote "We supplied ourselves with living plants, which were transmitted to England, all of which grew, and were sold for five guineas each."

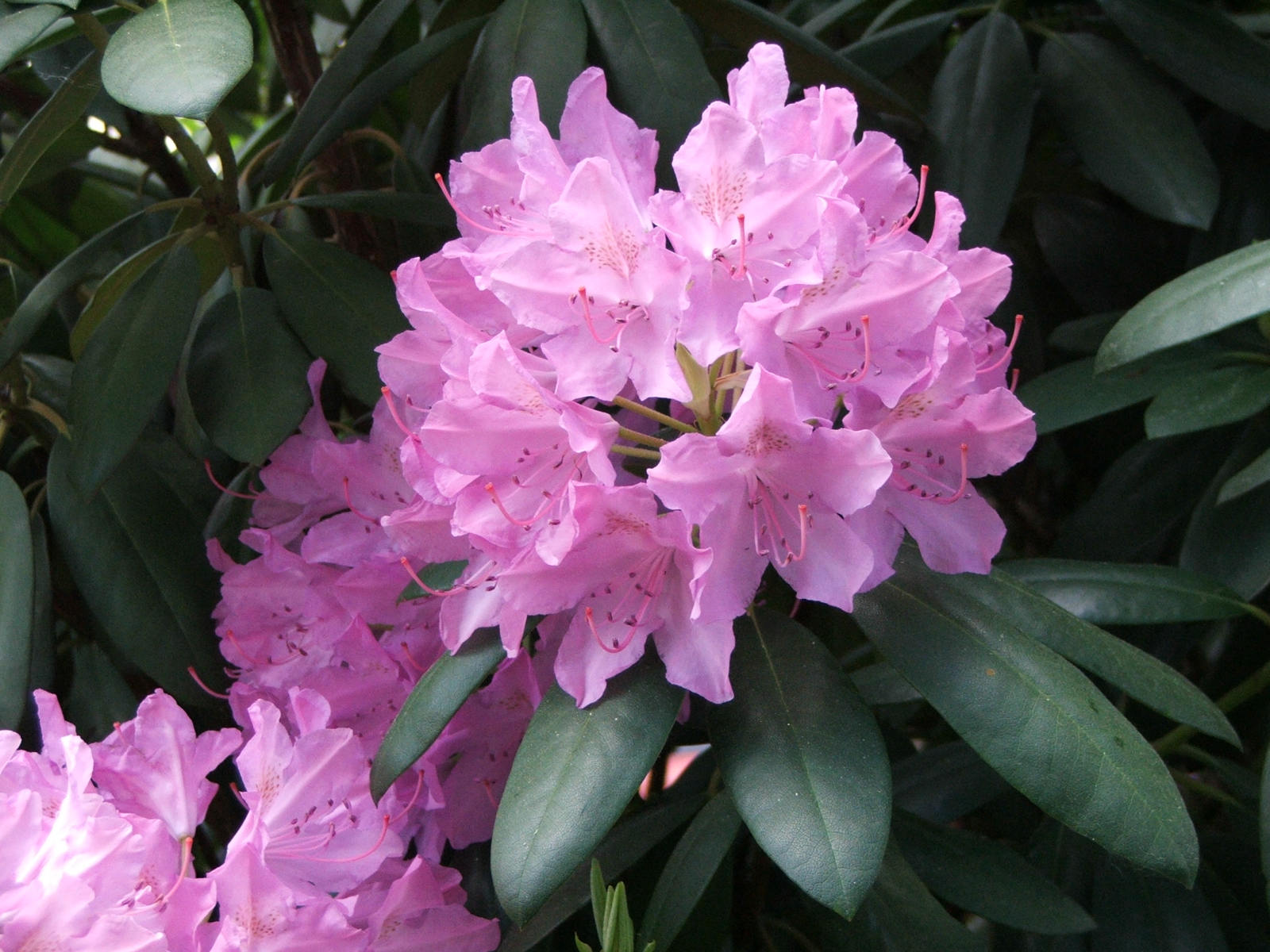
Fraser was the first European to collect Rhododendron catawbiense

John's brother, James, was actively involved with the American side of Fraser's plant export-import business, and from at least 1791, they jointly leased some land in Charleston until May 1800. In 1796, the brothers mortgaged 406 acres on Johns Island along the marshy edge of Stono River, originally a part of the Fenwick Hall estate. The brothers had difficulties with their land deals though, and in 1798, they fell behind in their payment obligations to the extent that their creditors instituted litigation to collect past due sums. Despite their problems with lawsuits, leases, mortgages, and land too marshy to be suited to their enterprise, in 1810, large numbers of rhododendrons, magnolias, and other native plants were still being shipped from the Fraser brothers' Charleston nursery by their agents there.

=== Russia ===
In 1795 Fraser made a first visit to Saint Petersburg where he sold a choice collection of plants to the Empress Catherine; to his delight she requested he set his own price. While there, he bought Black and White Tartarian cherries in 1796, thereafter introducing them for the first time to England. In 1797 Czar Paul I ordered that Fraser be paid 4,000 rubles for his plants that year, and by the next spring, Fraser had received £500 sterling for his efforts. In 1798 Fraser travelled again to Russia, returning afterward with the commission Botanical Collector to the Emperor Paul, under the signature of each Paul and Catherine and dated Pavlovskoe, August 1798.

=== America and West Indies ===
Based on his trust in the Imperial commission and in furtherance of carrying out the duties it imposed upon him, Fraser and his eldest son John started out once more in 1799, bound for America and the West Indies. They visited with Thomas Jefferson at Monticello and made an extended journey through Kentucky, eastern Tennessee, and northern Georgia, returning to Charleston in December 1800. From there they set out for Cuba, but the sailing was a perilous one since between Havana and the United States they were shipwrecked on a coral reef, about 40 miles (64 km) from land and 80 miles (130 km) from Havana, escaping only with great difficulty. "For six days they, with sixteen of the crew, endured the greatest privations until picked up by a Spanish boat and conveyed to land." The trip was nearly disastrous and the men barely escaped with their lives.

While collecting specimens in Cuba, "a time when the sea [was] swarming with pirates", Fraser met the explorers Alexander von Humboldt and Aimé Bonpland on their circuitous journey from the Amazon to Cartagena. John's son returned to England first, transporting a large botanical collection of Humboldt's after he had kindly intervened on their behalf during their sojourn to keep them safe. Fraser returned from Cuba to America and then to England in 1801 or 1802 with "a goodly collection of rarities," one of which was his discovery (as a European) of Jatropha pandurifolia. In 1807, both father and son again sailed for North America and the West Indies. On his next trip to London after collecting in Matanzas, Fraser brought home a tropical palm with silvered leaves, Corypha miraguama, and made a manufacturing proposal for hand-weaving of hats and bonnets from its leaves; Fraser's sister Christiana "Christy" Fraser, opened an establishment for the purpose under Queen Charlotte's patronage (the Queen was an amateur botanist) and employed a number of people, but the scheme ultimately failed, possibly through scarcity of material.

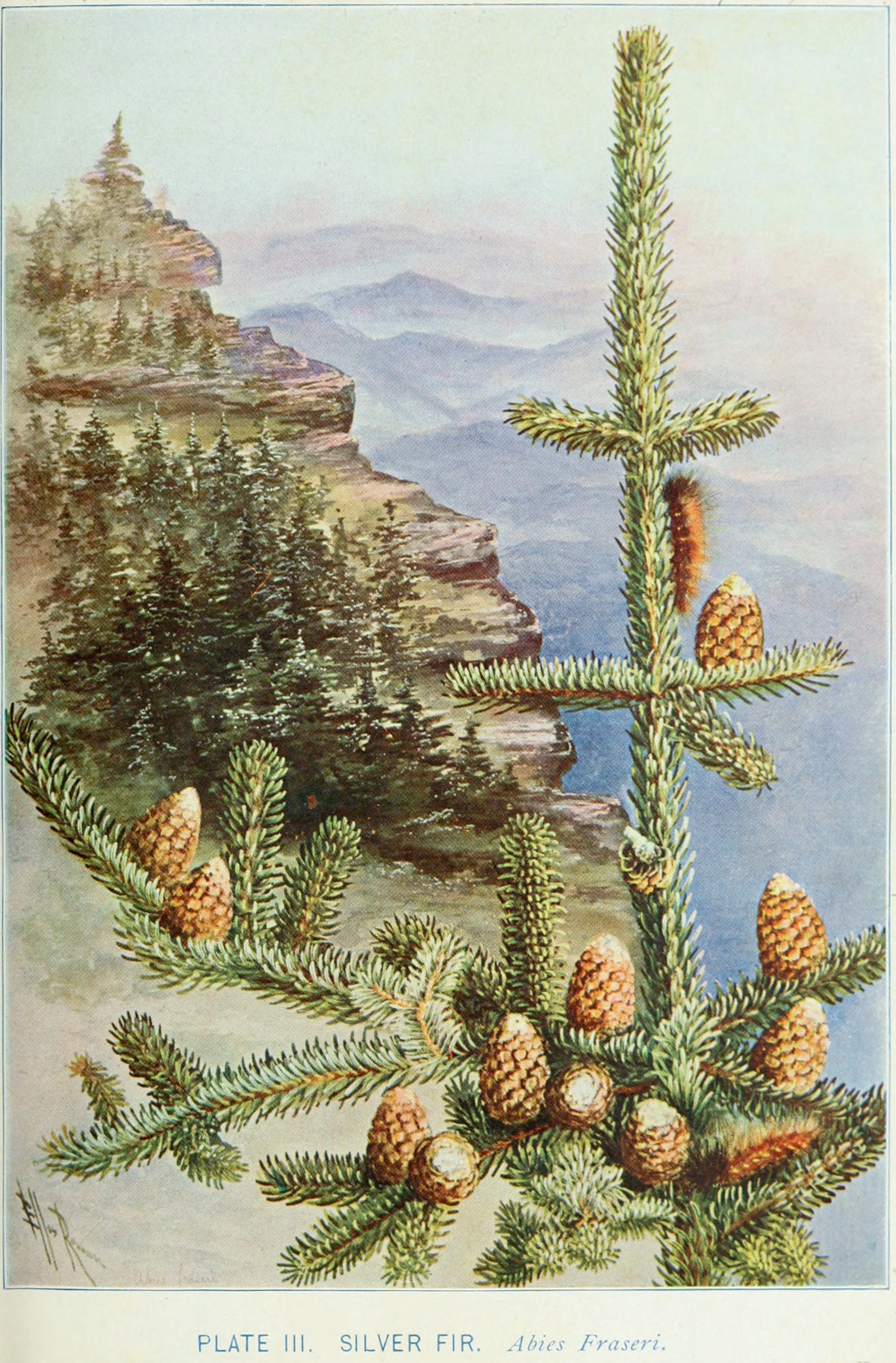
Abies fraseri (Fraser's Fir), named after John Fraser, is native to the southeastern Appalachian Mountains.

=== Business difficulties ===
When Fraser made his next visit to the Romanov court in 1801 expecting remuneration, to his great disappointment he discovered that Emperor Alexander I declined to recognise Fraser's appointment and would have nothing to do with him. Undaunted, he repeated the trip, visiting both Moscow and Saint Petersburg, but in vain. Fraser petitioned his cause for two years, finally resorting to seeking assistance from the British ambassadorial corps and was ultimately paid 6,000 rubles by royal decree. The Dowager Empress Maria Feodorovna, an enthusiastic amateur botanist, supported his efforts, giving him a diamond ring and commissioning him for specimens for the Imperial Gardens of Gatchina and Pavlovsk Palace. The director of the Imperial Botanic Garden at Saint Petersburg catalogued 18 of Fraser's North American species in the early years of the 19th century, with some of the specimens surviving as of 1997 in the Komarov Botanical Institute of the Russian Academy of Sciences.

After the Romanov affair, Fraser faced severe financial difficulty, though again he sailed to America. While successful in his researches there, his nursery in London fell into neglect through his absence and money problems. His financial situation may have affected his relationship with his brother James, since in 1809 Fraser sued his brother as former business partner in the Charleston Court of Common Pleas for debts exceeding £1,042.

=== Later voyages ===
Fraser made his seventh and last voyage to the United States in 1807. Near Charleston, he fell from his horse and broke several of his ribs; an injury from which he never fully recovered. His final voyage before returning to England was from America to Cuba in 1810 for a last visit to a country that welcomed him despite the nationalistic differences of the day, and from which he had a richly rewarding collecting history.

=== Death ===
Although he was known to his contemporaries as "John Fraser, the indefatigable", owing to his business and travel vexations and possibly also to exhaustion from his injuries after his fall, and his frequent and fatiguing journeys, his life was shortened—he died in April 1811 in London, Sloane Square, at age 60, leaving two sons; his wife died a few years afterwards. He did live long enough to see one grandchild, William, born to John Jr. and his wife Sarah on 30 June 1808. Fraser's financial difficulties must have been a heavy burden to his family even after he died, since two years afterward he was declared to have been bankrupt at his death. Fraser did take care of his family though, as the terms of his will gave his unmarried sister Christy a place in his home and financial aid from his sons; in 1818 Christy was still receiving her support as specified by that will.

== Legacy ==
Throughout his travels, Fraser sent his collections to his nursery in London for reproduction and general sale to gardeners and architects coming to London to look for plants; to his herbarium (later becoming that of the Linnean Society) for further study; and to his clients, including Catherine the Great, Emperor Paul I, the Dowager Empress Maria Feodorovna, the Chelsea Physic Garden, William Aiton (head gardener of Kew Gardens), Sir James Edward Smith (founder of the Linnean Society), and others. William Roscoe wrote of him: "John Fraser brought more plants into this kingdom [Britain] than any other person." Fraser was hailed early on by his biographers as "[O]ne of the most enterprising, indefatigable, and persevering men that ever embarked in the cause of botany and natural science."

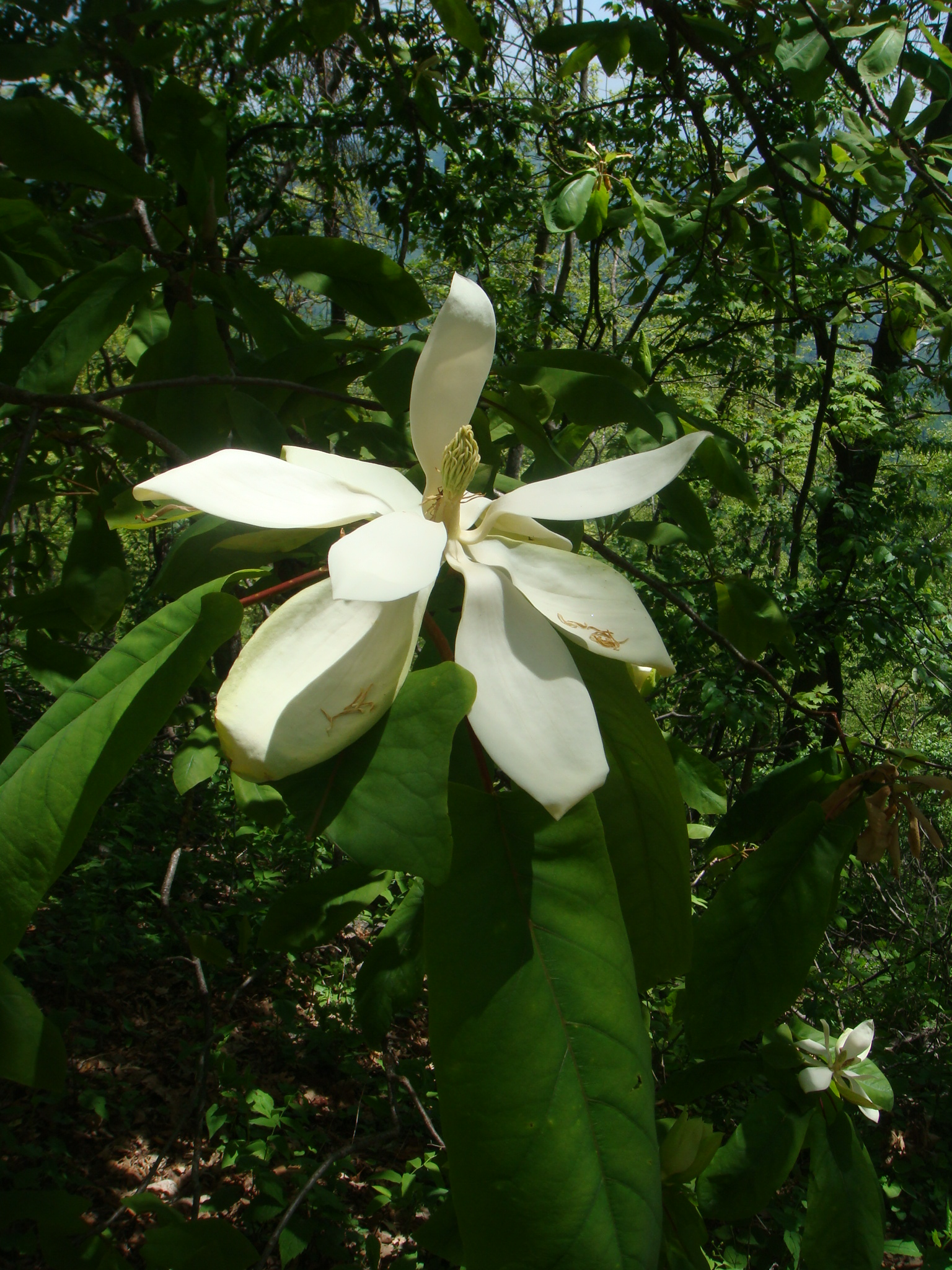
Magnolia fraseri, named after John Fraser

=== Species named after Fraser ===
Species named after Fraser include, among others, Abies fraseri (Fraser's fir), Magnolia fraseri (Fraser's magnolia), and the genus of gentianworts Frasera. A 50-foot Fraser fir was used in 1998 as the U.S. Capitol Christmas Tree; the species was also used in 1974. The Fraser's Saint John's wort (Triadenum fraseri) is also named in honour of Fraser.

=== Progeny ===
Fraser's eldest son John Jr. (c. 1779–1852) continued in his father's footsteps as a plant hunter after Fraser's death and became a respected nurseryman in his own right (ALS 1848). John Jr. also owned the Hermitage Nursery at Ramsgate (1817–1835), and when he retired he sold his nursery to William Curtis in 1835. John Jr. met with the celebrated American botanist Asa Gray in 1839, early on in Gray's career, and ultimately sold the Fraser herbarium to the Linnean Society in 1849.

Fraser's younger son, James Thomas, directed the family nursery at Chelsea with his older brother until 1811 and then on his own until 1827. Fraser's grandson, John, became a member of the Royal Horticultural Society, attending meetings in 1877.

== Publications ==
- Fraser, John, pub., Thomas Walter, Flora Caroliniana, 1788.
- Fraser, John, A Short History of Agrostis Cornucopiae, 1789.
- Fraser, John, Nursery Catalogues, repub. in Journal of Botany, British and Foreign, vol. 37, 1899, pp. 481–87.
- Fraser, John, Nursery Catalogues, repub. in Journal of Botany, British and Foreign, vol. 45, 1907, p. 255; and vol. 53, 1915, p. 271.
- Fraser, John, Nursery Catalogues, repub. in Journal of Botany, 1921, pp. 69–71.

== Letters and portraits ==
John Fraser's letters are maintained at the Royal Society of Arts, and one of his portraits hung at the Hunt Library. Both Hoppner and Raeburn painted his portrait. Fraser was an elected fellow of both the Linnean Society of London (FLS 1810) and the Royal Horticultural Society, denoted by his use of "F.R.H.S.".

== Botanical name notes ==
John Fraser's son John Jr., né John Fraser (c. 1779–1852), takes the author abbreviation Fraser f. in citations.

North American plants discovered and introduced by John Fraser between 1785 and 1799; and by J. Fraser, Jr., from 1799 to 1817.

- Agrostis Cornucopiae.
- Aletris aurea.
- Allium cernuum, Bot. 1324.
  - — reticulatum.
- Andromeda cassinaefolia, Bot. Mag. t. 970.
  - — Catesbaei, Bot. Mag. t. 1955.
  - — dealbata, Bot. Reg. t. 1010.
  - — ferruginea.
  - — floribunda, Bot. Reg. t. 1566.
  - — serratifolia.
- Annona pygmaea.
- Asarum arifolium. Hook Ex. Fl. t. 40.
- Asclepias amplexicaulis.
  - — acuminata.
  - — Linaria.
  - — pedicellata.
  - — perfoliata.
  - — salviaefolia.
- Azalea arborescens.
  - — calendulacea, Bot. Mag. t. 1721(β)
  - — canescens.
  - — coccinea, Bot. Mag. t 180.
  - — glauca.
  - — nitida.
- Bartsia coccinea.
- Befaria racemosa.
- Betula lutea.
- Blandfordia cordata.
- Buchnera pedunculata.
- Calycanthus glaucus, Bot. Reg. t. 404.
  - — laevigatus, Bot. Reg. t. 481.
- Carex Fraseriana, Bot. Mag. t. 1391.
- Chaptalia tomentosa, Bot. Mag. (Tussilago integrifolia) t. 2257.
- Clethra scabra.
- Collinsonia ovalis.
  - — tuberosa.
- Commelina angustifolia.
- Convolvulus tenellus.
- Coreopsis latifolia.
- Corypha Hystrix.
- Cristaria coccinea, Bot. Mag. t. 1673.
- Croton maritimum.
- Cypripedium Calceolus.
- Cypripedium pubescens, Lodd. t. 895.
- Cypripedium reginae.
- Cyrilla Caroliniana, Bot. Mag. t. 2456.
- Diospyros pubescens.
- Dracocephalum caeruleum.
- Echites difformis.
- Elaeagnus argenteus.
- Erigeron bellidifolium.
  - — compositum.
  - — nudicaule.
- Euphorbia Ipecacuanha, Bot. Mag. t. 1494.
  - — marginata.
- Frasera Walteri.
- Galardia bicolor, Bot. Mag. t. 1602, and vars. 2940, and 3368.
- Gentiana crinita, Bot. Mag. t. 1039 (G. fimbriata).
  - — incarnata, Bot. Mag. t. 1856.
- Gerardia flava.
  - — quercifolia.
  - — tenuifolia.
- Gnaphalium undulatum.
- Halesia parviflora.
- Hamamelis macrophylla.
- Helonias angustifolia, Bot. Mag, t. 1540.
- Hydrangea quercifolia, Bot. Mag. t. 975.
  - — radiata.
- Hypoxis juncea.
- Ilex angustifolia.
- Illicium parviflorum.
- Ipomaea Jalapa, Bot. Mag. t. 1572.
  - — Michauxii.
  - — sagittifolia.
- Ipomopsis elegans, Bot. Reg. t. 1281.
- Jeffersonia diphylla, Bot. Mag. t. 1513.
- Juglans amara.
  - — porcina.
  - — sulcata.
- Kalmia hirsuta, Bot. Mag. t. 138.
  - — rosmarinifolia.
- Larix Fraseri.
- Laurus Caroliniensis
  - — Catesbaei.
  - — Diospyros, Bot. Mag. t. 1470.
  - — melissaefolia, Bot. Mag. t. 1470.
- Liatris cylindracea
  - — elegans.
  - — odoratissima.
  - — pilosa.
  - — sphaeroidea.
- Lilium Catesbei Bot. Mag. t. 259.
- Lobelia puberula, Bot. Mag. t. 3292.
- Lonicera Caroliniensis.
  - — flava, Bot. Mag. t. 1318.
- Lupinus villosus.
- Macbridea pulchra.
- Magnolia auriculata, Bot. Mag. t. 1206.
  - — Fraseri.
  - — cordata, Bot. Reg. t. 325.
  - — macrophylla, Bot. Mag. t. 2189.
  - — pyramidata, Bot. Reg. t. 407.
- Malachodendron ovatum, Bot. Reg. t. 1104.
- Malaxis unifolia.
- Menziesia ferruginea, Bot. Mag. t. 1571.
  - — globularis.
- Mespilus spathulata.
- Muhlenbergia diffusa.
- Nelumbium macrophyllum.
- Neottia cernua, Bot. Mag. t. 1568.
  - — tortilis.
- Nymphsea odorata, Bot. Mag. t. 819.
  - — reniformis.
- Oenothera caespitosa, Bot. Mag. t. 1593.
  - — Fraseri, Bot. Mag. t 1674.
  - — glauca, Bot. Mag. t. 1606.
  - — macrocarpa, Bot. Mag. t. 1592.
  - — Missourensis.
- Orchis spectabilis, Exot. Fl. t. 69.
- Pachysandra procumbens, Bot. Mag. t. 1964.
- Pancratium Carolinianum, Bot. Reg. t. 926.
- Pavia macrostachya.
- Pedicularis Canadensis, Bot. Mag. t. 2506.
- Phalangium esculentum, Bot. Mag. t. 1574.
  - — (Quamash).
- Pinckneya pubescens.
- Pinguicula lutea, Bot. Reg. t. 126.
- Pinus Cedrus.
- Pinus lutea.
  - — palustris.
  - — pungens.
- Phlox acuminata, Bot. Mag. t 1880.
  - — amaena Bot. Mag. t. 1308.
  - — Carolina, Bot. Mag. t. 1344.
  - — nivea.
  - — pyramidalis.
  - — setacea, Bot. Mag. t. 415.
  - — stolonifera, Bot. Mag. t. 563.
  - — subulata, Bot. Mag. 411.
- Polygonum arifolium.
- Pontederia lanceolata.
- Prunus Chicasa.
  - — maritima.
- Prunus pygmaea.
- Pycnanthemum lanceolatum.
  - — verticillatum.
- Pyrola maculata, Bot. Mag. t. 897.
  - — repens.
- Pyxidanthera barbulata.
- Quercus Bannisteri.
  - — Catesbaei.
  - — castanea.
  - — hemisphaerica.
  - — imbricaria.
  - — laurifolia.
  - — lyrata.
  - — Michauxii.
  - — montana.
  - — olivaeformis.
  - — prinoides.
  - — tinctoria.
- Rhexia Caroliniensis
- Rhododendron Catawbiense, Bot. Mag. t. 1671.
  - — punctatum, Bot. Reg. 37.
- Ribes aureum, Bot. Reg. t. 125.
  - — hirtellum.
  - — resinosum, Bot. Mag. t. 1583.
- Rosa Caroliniensis.
  - — laevigata.
- Rudbeckia pinnata, Bot. Mag. t. 2310.
- Sagittaria falcata.
  - — graminea.
  - — latifolia.
- Salix cordifolia.
  - — falcata.
- Salvia azurea, Bot. Mag. t. 1728.
- Sarracenia adunca, Bot. Mag. t. 1710.
  - — rubra, Bot. Mag. t. 3515.
- Satyrium repens.
- Schizandra coccinea, Bot. Mag. t. 1413.
- Scutellaria Canadensis.
- Sideranthus pinnatifidus.
  - — villosus.
- Silene pennsylvanica, Bot. Mag. t. 3342.
  - — Virginica.
- Smilax lanceolata.
  - — pubera.
  - — quadrangularis.
- Streptopus roseus.
- Thalia dealbata, Bot. Mag. t. 1690.
- Thymbra Caroliniana, Bot. Mag. t. 997.
- Tradescantia rosea.
- Trillium pictum.
  - — pusillum.
- Vaccinium buxifolium, Bot. Mag. t. 928.
  - — frondosum.
  - — myrsinites, Bot. Mag. t. 1550.
  - — myrtifolium.
  - — nitidum, Bot. Mag. t. 1550.
  - — parviflorum, Bot. Mag. t. 1288.
- Verbena bracteosa, Bot. Mag. t. 2910.
  - — rugosa.
- Viola papilionacea.
  - — pedata, Bot. Mag. t. 89.
  - — pubescens.
  - — rotundifolia.
- Virgilia lutea.
- Ulmus alata.
- Uniola paniculata.
- Uvularia grandiflora, Bot. Mag. t. 1112.
- Waltheria Caroliniana.
- Xyris Canadensis.
- Yucca Missourensis.
  - — recurva.
  - — serrulata.
- Zamia pumila.

== See also ==
- History of botany
- List of gardener-botanist explorers of the Enlightenment
- Scottish Enlightenment
- The Plant List
- International Plant Names Index
