= 1958–59 Colchester United F.C. season =

Colchester United
1958–59 season
- Chairman: Bill Allen
- Manager: Benny Fenton
- Stadium: Layer Road
- Third Division: 5th
- FA Cup: 4th round (eliminated by Arsenal)
- Top goalscorer: League: Neil Langman (20); All: Neil Langman (27)
- Highest home attendance: 16,000 v Arsenal, 24 January 1959
- Lowest home attendance: 4,406 v Notts County, 23 February 1959
- Average home league attendance: 8,357
- Biggest win: 8–2 v Stockport County, 4 October 1958; 7–1 v Yeovil Town, 11 December 1958
- Biggest defeat: 0–4 v Arsenal, 28 January 1959; 0–4 v Brentford, 21 March 1959
Home colours

The 1958–59 season was Colchester United's 17th season in their history and their ninth season in the third tier of English football, the newly formed national Third Division. Alongside competing in the Third Division, the club also participated in the FA Cup. Colchester reached the fourth round of the FA Cup, beating Bath City, Yeovil Town and Chesterfield on their way to meeting Arsenal. Drawn at home, Colchester held Arsenal to a 2–2 Layer Road draw, but were defeated 4–0 at Highbury in the replay. Colchester finished fifth in the Third Division, nine points shy of promotion.

== Season overview ==
In the new national Third Division, Colchester excelled against their northern counterparts, winning 21 games, more than half of which were clubs previously in the Third Division North. Colchester finished the season in fifth position, just nine points away from Hull City in second place, and ten behind champions Plymouth Argyle. They also earned a club record win when they beat Stockport County 8–2 on 4 October, and a club record away win when they beat Yeovil Town 7–1.

The club's main highlight during the campaign was their FA Cup run, their first venture outside of the first round in six seasons. Colchester defeated old Southern League rivals Bath City and Yeovil Town in the first and second rounds, before seeing off Chesterfield to set up a fourth round tie with Arsenal. For the first time local police set a limit on crowd numbers at Layer Road for the Arsenal game with 16,000 witnessing the 2–2 draw. 62,686 people watched the replay at Highbury in thick fog as the Gunners ran out 4–0 winners.

Both big-money signings from last season, Neil Langman and John Evans, helped repay their transfer fees by scoring 27 and 16 goals respectively. Meanwhile, the proceeds from the Arsenal fixture meant that floodlighting could be installed at Layer Road for the first time.

== Players ==
As of match played 4 May 1959.

Name	Position	Nationality	Place of birth	Date of birth	Apps	Goals	Signed from	Date signed	Fee
Goalkeepers
Percy Ames	GK	(England)	Plymouth	13 December 1931 (aged 26)	139	0	(England) Tottenham Hotspur	1 May 1955	Free transfer
John Wright	GK	(England)	Aldershot	13 August 1933 (aged 24)	4	0	(England) Colchester Casuals	23 May 1952	Free transfer
Defenders
Brian Dobson	CB	(England)	Colchester	1 March 1934 (aged 24)	23	0	Amateur	January 1956	Free transfer
George Fisher	FB	(England)	Bermondsey	19 June 1925 (aged 32)	135	4	(England) Fulham	1 September 1955	£1,000
John Fowler	FB	(Scotland)	Leith	17 October 1933 (aged 24)	106	3	(Scotland) Bonnyrigg Rose Athletic	20 August 1955 (Note: Date of signing refers to the date of the player's first game for the club)	Free transfer
John Laidlaw	FB	(England)	Aldershot	5 July 1936 (aged 21)	0	0	(Scotland) Easthouses Lily Miners Welfare	June 1957	Free transfer
Alf Marshall	FB	(England)	Dagenham	21 May 1933 (aged 25)	0	0	(England) Dagenham	14 October 1957	£25
Chic Milligan	CB	(Scotland)	Ardrossan	26 July 1930 (aged 27)	62	1	(Scotland) Ardrossan Winton Rovers	18 August 1956	£1,000
John Roe	FB	(Scotland)	Broxburn	7 January 1938 (aged 20)	0	0	(Scotland) West Calder United	July 1958	Free transfer
Edgar Rumney	FB	(England)	Abberton	15 September 1936 (aged 21)	5	0	(England) Colchester Casuals	1 May 1957	Free transfer
Midfielders
Cyril Hammond	WH	(England)	Woolwich	10 October 1927 (aged 30)	0	0	(England) Charlton Athletic	July 1958	Free transfer
Trevor Harris	WH	(England)	Colchester	6 February 1936 (aged 22)	10	0	Amateur	July 1951	Free transfer
Ron Hunt	WH	(England)	Colchester	26 September 1933 (aged 24)	38	0	Amateur	October 1951	Free transfer
Derek Parker	WH	(England)	Wivenhoe	23 June 1926 (aged 31)	36	1	(England) West Ham United	March 1957	£2,500
Forwards
Russell Blake	WG	(England)	Colchester	24 July 1935 (aged 22)	15	2	(England) Dedham Old Boys	8 September 1955	Free transfer
John Evans	IF	(England)	Tilbury	28 August 1929 (aged 28)	24	7	(England) Liverpool	23 November 1957	£4,000
Bobby Hill	IF	(Scotland)	Edinburgh	9 June 1938 (aged 19)	54	8	(Scotland) Easthouses Lily Miners Welfare	9 June 1955	Free transfer
Ian Johnstone	IF	(Scotland)	Galashiels	2 March 1939 (aged 19)	0	0	(Scotland) Ormiston Primrose	18 April 1959	Free transfer
Martyn King	CF	(England)	Birmingham	23 August 1937 (aged 20)	3	1	Amateur	Summer 1955	Free transfer
Neil Langman	CF	(England)	Bere Alston	21 February 1932 (aged 26)	23	8	(England) Plymouth Argyle	November 1957	£6,750
Kevin McCurley	CF	(England)	Consett	2 April 1926 (aged 32)	218	86	(England) Liverpool	June 1951	£750
Sammy McLeod	IF	(Scotland)	Glasgow	4 January 1934 (aged 24)	63	6	(Scotland) Easthouses Lily Miners Welfare	20 August 1955	Free transfer
Tony Miller	IF	(England)	Chelmsford	26 October 1937 (aged 20)	0	0	Amateur	May 1958	Free transfer
Ken Plant	CF	(England)	Nuneaton	15 August 1925 (aged 32)	188	79	(England) Bury	January 1954	Undisclosed
Tommy Williams	WG	(England)	Battersea	10 February 1935 (aged 23)	52	8	(England) Carshalton Athletic	September 1956	Free transfer
Peter Wright	WG	(England)	Colchester	26 January 1934 (aged 24)	204	46	Amateur	November 1951	Free transfer

== Transfers ==
=== In ===
Date	Position	Nationality	Name	From	Fee	Ref.
May 1958	IF	(England)	Tony Miller	Amateur	Free transfer	
July 1958	WH	(England)	Cyril Hammond	(England) Charlton Athletic	Free transfer	
July 1958	FB	(Scotland)	John Roe	(Scotland) West Calder United	Free transfer	
18 April 1959	IF	(Scotland)	Ian Johnstone	(Scotland) Ormiston Primrose	Free transfer	(Note: Date of signing refers to the date of the player's first game for the club)

=== Out ===
Date	Position	Nationality	Name	To	Fee	Ref.
End of season	WH	(England)	Benny Fenton	(England) Colchester United	Retired from playing, remained as manager	
July 1958	WH	(England)	Bert Hill	(England) Dartford	Free transfer	
26 December 1958	IF	(Scotland)	Hamish McNeill	(England) Cambridge City	Nominal	

== Match details ==
=== Third Division ===
==== Results round by round ====
Round	1	2	3	4	5	6	7	8	9	10	11	12	13	14	15	16	17	18	19	20	21	22	23	24	25	26	27	28	29	30	31	32	33	34	35	36	37	38	39	40	41	42	43	44	45	46
Ground	H	H	A	A	H	H	A	H	A	A	H	H	A	H	A	A	H	H	A	A	H	A	H	H	A	A	H	A	H	A	H	A	H	A	A	H	H	A	A	H	H	H	A	H	A	A
Result	L	W	L	W	W	W	D	W	D	D	L	W	D	D	L	W	L	L	W	W	D	D	W	D	W	W	L	D	D	W	W	L	W	L	W	L	L	L	L	L	W	W	W	W	L	W
Position	17	9	19	13	8	3	7	6	5	7	8	7	5	7	7	3	6	9	8	6	5	8	5	6	3	3	4	4	4	4	3	3	3	4	4	4	6	6	9	10	10	9	7	6	8	5

Source: 11v11.com
A = Away; H = Home; W = Win; D = Draw; L = Loss

==== League table ====
Pos	Team	Pld	W	D	L	GF	GA	GAv	Pts
3	Brentford	46	21	15	10	76	49	1.551	57
4	Norwich City	46	22	13	11	89	62	1.435	57
5	Colchester United	46	21	10	15	71	67	1.060	52
6	Reading	46	21	8	17	78	63	1.238	50
7	Tranmere Rovers	46	21	8	17	82	67	1.224	50

==== Matches ====
23 August 1958 1	Colchester United	1–3	Bury	Colchester
	Langman	Report	Unknown goalscorer	Stadium: Layer Road; Attendance: 9,394

25 August 1958 2	Colchester United	2–1	Norwich City	Colchester
	Blake	Report	Unknown goalscorer	Stadium: Layer Road; Attendance: 9,379

30 August 1958 3	Queens Park Rangers	4–2	Colchester United	Shepherd's Bush
	Unknown goalscorer	Report	Langman	Stadium: Loftus Road; Attendance: 9,733

3 September 1958 4	Norwich City	1–2	Colchester United	Norwich
	Unknown goalscorer	Report	Evans; Langman	Stadium: Carrow Road; Attendance: 25,132

6 September 1958 5	Colchester United	2–1	Rochdale	Colchester
	Langman; McLeod	Report	Unknown goalscorer	Stadium: Layer Road; Attendance: 8,141

8 September 1958 6	Colchester United	1–0	Accrington Stanley	Colchester
	Langman	Report		Stadium: Layer Road; Attendance: 7,380

17 September 1958 7	Accrington Stanley	1–1	Colchester United	Accrington
	Unknown goalscorer	Report	Own goal (o.g.)	Stadium: Peel Park; Attendance: 8,350

20 September 1958 8	Colchester United	2–0	Plymouth Argyle	Colchester
	Evans (pen.)	Report; Report		Stadium: Layer Road; Attendance: 10,038

24 September 1958 9	Southend United	1–1	Colchester United	Southend-on-Sea
	Punton	Report; Report	Langman	Stadium: Roots Hall; Attendance: 11,471

27 September 1958 10	Tranmere Rovers	3–3	Colchester United	Birkenhead
	Unknown goalscorer	Report	Own goal (o.g.); McLeod	Stadium: Prenton Park; Attendance: 14,000

29 September 1958 11	Colchester United	0–1	Southend United	Colchester
		Report; Report	Thomson	Stadium: Layer Road; Attendance: 6,833

4 October 1958 12	Colchester United	8–2	Stockport County	Colchester
	Evans; Langman; McLeod	Report	Murray; Clarke	Stadium: Layer Road; Attendance: 8,298

8 October 1958 13	Reading	0–0	Colchester United	Reading
		Report		Stadium: Elm Park; Attendance: 17,401

11 October 1958 14	Colchester United	1–1	Wrexham	Colchester
	Evans	Report	Unknown goalscorer	Stadium: Layer Road; Attendance: 9,204

16 October 1958 15	Doncaster Rovers	2–1	Colchester United	Doncaster
	Unknown goalscorer	Report	Blake	Stadium: Belle Vue; Attendance: 2,786

18 October 1958 16	Bradford City	1–3	Colchester United	Bradford
	Unknown goalscorer	Report	Plant; Langman	Stadium: Valley Parade; Attendance: 12,307

25 October 1958 17	Colchester United	1–3	Hull City	Colchester
	McCurley	Report	Bradbury; Smith; Coates	Stadium: Layer Road; Attendance: 9,277

1 November 1958 18	Brentford	2–1	Colchester United	Brentford
	Towers; Heath	Report	Langman	Stadium: Griffin Park; Attendance: 11,930

8 November 1958 19	Colchester United	1–0	Swindon Town	Colchester
	Plant	Report; Report		Stadium: Layer Road; Attendance: 8,001

22 November 1958 20	Colchester United	3–2	Newport County	Colchester
	Langman; P. Wright; Blake	Report	McPherson; Graham	Stadium: Layer Road; Attendance: 7,271

29 November 1958 21	Chesterfield	2–2	Colchester United	Chesterfield
	Unknown goalscorer	Report	P. Wright	Stadium: Saltergate; Attendance: 7,140

20 December 1958 22	Bury	0–0	Colchester United	Bury
		Report		Stadium: Gigg Lane; Attendance: 11,615

26 December 1958 23	Colchester United	3–1	Bournemouth & Boscombe Athletic	Colchester
	Langman; McLeod; Williams	Report	Unknown goalscorer	Stadium: Layer Road; Attendance: 9,182

27 December 1958 24	Bournemouth & Boscombe Athletic	1–1	Colchester United	Bournemouth
	Unknown goalscorer	Report	Williams	Stadium: Dean Court; Attendance: 12,404

3 January 1959 25	Colchester United	3–0	Queens Park Rangers	Colchester
	Fisher; Evans; Langman	Report		Stadium: Layer Road; Attendance: 8,719

31 January 1959 26	Colchester United	1–0	Doncaster Rovers	Colchester
	Langman	Report		Stadium: Layer Road; Attendance: 8,658

2 February 1959 27	Mansfield Town	3–2	Colchester United	Mansfield
	Unknown goalscorer	Report	Hill; McCurley	Stadium: Field Mill; Attendance: 5,155

7 February 1959 28	Plymouth Argyle	1–1	Colchester United	Plymouth
	Williams	Report; Report	Evans	Stadium: Home Park; Attendance: 22,686

14 February 1959 29	Colchester United	1–1	Tranmere Rovers	Colchester
	Own goal (o.g.)	Report	Unknown goalscorer	Stadium: Layer Road; Attendance: 7,160

21 February 1959 30	Stockport County	0–1	Colchester United	Stockport
		Report	Williams	Stadium: Edgeley Park; Attendance: 5,734

23 February 1959 31	Colchester United	4–1	Notts County	Colchester
	McCurley; Langman; P. Wright	Report	Unknown goalscorer	Stadium: Layer Road; Attendance: 4,406

28 February 1959 32	Wrexham	2–0	Colchester United	Wrexham
	Unknown goalscorer	Report		Stadium: Racecourse Ground; Attendance: 8,635

7 March 1959 33	Colchester United	3–2	Bradford City	Colchester
	McCurley; Langman; Williams	Report	Unknown goalscorer	Stadium: Layer Road; Attendance: 7,139

14 March 1959 34	Hull City	3–0	Colchester United	Kingston upon Hull
	Davidson; Smith	Report		Stadium: Boothferry Park; Attendance: 16,668

16 March 1959 35	Rochdale	0–1	Colchester United	Rochdale
		Report	Langman	Stadium: Spotland Stadium; Attendance: 3,510

21 March 1959 36	Colchester United	0–4	Brentford	Colchester
		Report	Francis; McLeod; Towers	Stadium: Layer Road; Attendance: 8,775

27 March 1959 37	Colchester United	1–3	Southampton	Colchester
	McCurley	Report	Paine; Hoskins; Reeves	Stadium: Layer Road; Attendance: 8,943

28 March 1959 38	Swindon Town	2–0	Colchester United	Swindon
	D'Arcy; Marshall	Report; Report		Stadium: County Ground; Attendance: 8,876

30 March 1959 39	Southampton	3–0	Colchester United	Southampton
	Mulgrew; Reeves; Page	Report		Stadium: The Dell; Attendance: 8,502

4 April 1959 40	Colchester United	1–3	Mansfield Town	Colchester
	Milligan (pen.)	Report	Unknown goalscorer	Stadium: Layer Road; Attendance: 5,901

18 April 1959 41	Colchester United	1–0	Chesterfield	Colchester
	Langman	Report		Stadium: Layer Road; Attendance: 5,433

20 April 1959 42	Colchester United	3–1	Reading	Colchester
	Evans (pen.); McLeod	Report	Unknown goalscorer	Stadium: Layer Road; Attendance: 5,590

25 April 1959 43	Notts County	0–1	Colchester United	Nottingham
		Report	Evans	Stadium: Meadow Lane; Attendance: 4,733

27 April 1959 44	Colchester United	3–1	Halifax Town	Colchester
	Evans (pen.); Blake; Williams	Report	Unknown goalscorer	Stadium: Layer Road; Attendance: 5,769

30 April 1959 45	Halifax Town	4–1	Colchester United	Halifax
	Unknown goalscorer	Report	Evans	Stadium: The Shay; Attendance: 5,458

4 May 1959 46	Newport County	0–1	Colchester United	Newport
		Report	P. Wright	Stadium: Somerton Park; Attendance: 4,702

=== FA Cup ===
15 November 1958 1st round	Colchester United	1–0	Bath City	Colchester
	Plant 14'; Langman 84'	Report		Stadium: Layer Road; Attendance: 10,636

15 November 1958 2nd round	Colchester United	1–1	Yeovil Town	Colchester
	Plant	Report	Earl	Stadium: Layer Road; Attendance: 10,890

11 December 1958 2nd round replay	Yeovil Town	1–7	Colchester United	Yeovil
	Dennis	Report	Langman; McLeod; Williams	Stadium: Huish Athletic Ground; Attendance: 10,000

10 January 1959 3rd round	Colchester United	2–0	Chesterfield	Colchester
	Evans 8'; Langman 54'	Report		Stadium: Layer Road; Attendance: 9,723

24 January 1959 4th round	Colchester United	2–2	Arsenal	Colchester
	Langman 80'; Evans 82'	Report	Groves 75', 76'	Stadium: Layer Road; Attendance: 16,000

28 January 1959 4th round replay	Arsenal	4–0	Colchester United	Highbury
19:30 GMT	Evans (pen.); Herd; Julians	Report; Programme		Stadium: Arsenal Stadium; Attendance: 62,686

== Squad statistics ==
=== Appearances and goals ===
No.	Pos	Nat	Player	Total		Third Division		FA Cup	
No.	Pos	Nat	Player	Apps	Goals	Apps	Goals	Apps	Goals
	GK	(England) ENG	Percy Ames	52	0	46	0	6	0
	DF	(England) ENG	George Fisher	34	1	28	1	6	0
	DF	(Scotland) SCO	John Fowler	48	0	42	0	6	0
	DF	(England) ENG	Alf Marshall	24	0	24	0	0	0
	DF	(Scotland) SCO	Chic Milligan	50	1	44	1	6	0
	MF	(England) ENG	Cyril Hammond	37	0	33	0	4	0
	MF	(England) ENG	Trevor Harris	1	0	1	0	0	0
	MF	(England) ENG	Ron Hunt	21	0	19	0	2	0
	MF	(England) ENG	Derek Parker	44	0	38	0	6	0
	FW	(England) ENG	Russell Blake	29	5	24	5	5	0
	FW	(England) ENG	John Evans	31	16	27	14	4	2
	FW	(Scotland) SCO	Bobby Hill	8	1	8	1	0	0
	FW	(Scotland) SCO	Ian Johnstone	1	0	1	0	0	0
	FW	(England) ENG	Martyn King	3	0	3	0	0	0
	FW	(England) ENG	Neil Langman	50	27	44	20	6	7
	FW	(England) ENG	Kevin McCurley	7	5	7	5	0	0
	FW	(Scotland) SCO	Sammy McLeod	44	10	38	8	6	2
	FW	(England) ENG	Ken Plant	9	5	7	3	2	2
	FW	(England) ENG	Tommy Williams	30	6	29	5	1	1
	FW	(England) ENG	Peter Wright	49	5	43	5	6	0

=== Goalscorers ===
Place	Nationality	Position	Name	Third Division	FA Cup	Total
1	(England)	CF	Neil Langman	20	7	27
2	(England)	IF	John Evans	14	2	16
3	(Scotland)	IF	Sammy McLeod	8	2	10
4	(England)	WG	Tommy Williams	5	1	6
5	(England)	WG	Russell Blake	5	0	5
5	(England)	CF	Kevin McCurley	5	0	5
5	(England)	CF	Ken Plant	3	2	5
5	(England)	WG	Peter Wright	5	0	5
9	(England)	FB	George Fisher	1	0	1
9	(Scotland)	IF	Bobby Hill	1	0	1
9	(Scotland)	CB	Chic Milligan	1	0	1
			Own goals	3	0	3
			TOTALS	71	14	85

=== Clean sheets ===
Number of games goalkeepers kept a clean sheet.

Place	Nationality	Player	Third Division	FA Cup	Total
1	(England)	Percy Ames	12	2	14
		TOTALS	12	2	14

=== Player debuts ===
Players making their first-team Colchester United debut in a fully competitive match.

Position	Nationality	Player	Date	Opponent	Ground	Notes
WH	(England)	Cyril Hammond	23 August 1958	Bury	Layer Road	
FB	(England)	Alf Marshall	8 October 1958	Reading	Elm Park	
IF	(Scotland)	Ian Johnstone	18 April 1959	Chesterfield	Layer Road	

== See also ==
- List of Colchester United F.C. seasons
