= 1955–56 Colchester United F.C. season =

Colchester United
1955–56 season
- Chairman: Bill Allen
- Manager: Benny Fenton
- Stadium: Layer Road
- Third Division South: 12th
- FA Cup: 1st round (eliminated by Torquay United)
- Top goalscorer: League: Kevin McCurley (29); All: Kevin McCurley (29)
- Highest home attendance: 13,176 v Ipswich Town, 26 December 1955
- Lowest home attendance: 4,811 v Millwall, 11 February 1956
- Average home league attendance: 7,668
- Biggest win: 5–0 v Swindon Town, 3 March 1956
- Biggest defeat: 0–6 v Leyton Orient, 8 September 1955
Home colours

The 1955–56 season was Colchester United's 14th season in their history and their sixth season in the Third Division South, the third tier of English football. Alongside competing in the Third Division South, the club also participated in the FA Cup in which the club were eliminated by Torquay United in the first round. The season was Benny Fenton's first full campaign in charge, and after building his own squad over the summer, he led Colchester to their highest position since the 1951–52 season with a 12th-placed finish. This came on the back of two consecutive seasons of successful re-election applications.

== Season overview ==
Manager Benny Fenton assembled his own squad for the 1955–56 season, bringing in goalkeeper Percy Ames from Tottenham Hotspur, while also signing a number of players from Scottish junior football including John Fowler, Bobby Hill and Sammy McLeod.

Fenton's side played an exciting attacking game. They scored 76 goals in the league, with Kevin McCurley scoring a club Football League best total of 29 goals, and strike partner Ken Plant scoring 17. Both players notched two hat-tricks each during the season as the club safely finished the campaign in 12th-place.

Colchester played their first game under floodlights on 28 February 1955 when they beat Reading 3–1 at Elm Park. While Layer Road was still bereft of floodlighting, lighting had been installed for training purposes at the ground.

== Players ==
As of match played 28 April 1956.

Name	Position	Nationality	Place of birth	Date of birth	Apps	Goals	Signed from	Date signed	Fee
Goalkeepers
Percy Ames	GK	(England)	Plymouth	13 December 1931 (aged 23)	0	0	(England) Tottenham Hotspur	1 May 1955	Free transfer
George Wright	GK	(England)	Plymouth	10 October 1919 (aged 35)	219	0	(England) Plymouth Argyle	May 1949	£1,000
John Wright	GK	(England)	Aldershot	13 August 1933 (aged 21)	2	0	(England) Colchester Casuals	23 May 1952	Free transfer
Defenders
Brian Dobson	CB	(England)	Colchester	1 March 1934 (aged 21)	0	0	Amateur	January 1956	Free transfer
George Fisher	FB	(England)	Bermondsey	19 June 1925 (aged 29)	0	0	(England) Fulham	1 September 1955	£1,000
John Fowler	FB	(Scotland)	Leith	17 October 1933 (aged 21)	0	0	(Scotland) Bonnyrigg Rose Athletic	20 August 1955 (Note: Date of signing refers to the date of the player's first game for the club)	Free transfer
George French	FB	(England)	Colchester	10 November 1926 (aged 28)	3	0	(England) West Ham United	February 1949	Free transfer
John Harrison	FB	(England)	Leicester	27 September 1927 (aged 27)	205	0	(England) Aston Villa	30 September 1950	Nominal
Billy Hunt	CB	(England)	Colchester	25 November 1934 (aged 20)	0	0	Amateur	August 1953	Free transfer
Reg Stewart	CB	(England)	Sheffield	30 October 1925 (aged 29)	265	1	(England) Sheffield Wednesday	20 August 1949	£1,000
Midfielders
Bob Dale	WH	(England)	Irlam	31 October 1931 (aged 23)	55	8	(England) Bury	24 December 1953	£1,500
Benny Fenton	WH	(England)	West Ham	10 October 1918 (aged 36)	11	2	(England) Charlton Athletic	5 March 1955	£500
Trevor Harris	WH	(England)	Colchester	6 February 1936 (aged 19)	1	0	Amateur	July 1951	Free transfer
Bert Hill	WH	(England)	West Ham	8 March 1930 (aged 25)	38	1	(England) Chelsea	September 1952	£300
Ron Hunt	WH	(England)	Colchester	26 September 1933 (aged 21)	31	0	Amateur	October 1951	Free transfer
Forwards
Russell Blake	WG	(England)	Colchester	24 July 1935 (aged 19)	0	0	(England) Dedham Old Boys	8 September 1955	Free transfer
Bobby Hill	IF	(Scotland)	Edinburgh	9 June 1938 (aged 16)	0	0	(Scotland) Easthouses Lily Miners Welfare	9 June 1955	Free transfer
Martyn King	CF	(England)	Birmingham	23 August 1937 (aged 17)	0	0	Amateur	Summer 1955	Free transfer
Kevin McCurley	CF	(England)	Consett	2 April 1926 (aged 29)	110	35	(England) Liverpool	June 1951	£750
Sammy McLeod	IF	(Scotland)	Glasgow	4 January 1934 (aged 21)	0	0	(Scotland) Easthouses Lily Miners Welfare	20 August 1955	Free transfer
Alfred Noble	IF	(England)	Hackney	18 September 1924 (aged 30)	0	0	(England) Briggs Sports	September 1955	Free transfer
Ken Plant	CF	(England)	Nuneaton	15 August 1925 (aged 29)	59	19	(England) Bury	January 1954	Undisclosed
Peter Wright	WG	(England)	Colchester	26 January 1934 (aged 21)	67	13	Amateur	November 1951	Free transfer

== Transfers ==
=== In ===
Date	Position	Nationality	Name	From	Fee	Ref.
Summer 1955	CF	(England)	Martyn King	Amateur	Free transfer	
1 May 1955	GK	(England)	Percy Ames	(England) Tottenham Hotspur	Free transfer	
9 June 1955	IF	(Scotland)	Bobby Hill	(Scotland) Easthouses Lily Miners Welfare	Free transfer	
20 August 1955	FB	(Scotland)	John Fowler	(Scotland) Bonnyrigg Rose Athletic	Free transfer	(Note: Date of signing refers to the date of the player's first game for the club)
20 August 1955	IF	(Scotland)	Sammy McLeod	(Scotland) Easthouses Lily Miners Welfare	Free transfer	
September 1955	IF	(England)	Alfred Noble	(England) Briggs Sports	Free transfer	
1 September 1955	FB	(England)	George Fisher	(England) Fulham	£1,000	
8 September 1955	WG	(England)	Russell Blake	(England) Dedham Old Boys	Free transfer	
January 1956	CB	(England)	Brian Dobson	Amateur	Free transfer	

- Total spending: ▼ ~ £1,000

=== Out ===
Date	Position	Nationality	Name	To	Fee	Ref.
End of season	WH	(Republic of Ireland)	Austin Dunne	(England) Tonbridge	Released	
Summer 1955	FB	(England)	Digger Kettle	(England) Sudbury Town	Free transfer	
4 May 1955	WH	(Scotland)	Jimmy Elder	(England) Yeovil Town	Released	(Note: Date of departure refers to the date of the player's final game for the club)
4 May 1955	FB	(England)	Fred Lewis	(England) Headington United	Released	
4 May 1955	WG	(Wales)	Cliff Birch	(England) Great Yarmouth Town	Free transfer	
July 1955	IF	(Republic of Ireland)	Paddy Leonard	(England) Tonbridge	Free transfer	
August 1955	IF	(Scotland)	Johnny McKim	(England) Clacton Town	Released	
September 1955	CB	(England)	Roy Bicknell	Retired	Retired	
March 1956	WG	(England)	Mike Grice	(England) West Ham United	£9,000	

- Total incoming: ▲ ~ £9,000

== Match details ==
=== Third Division South ===
==== Results round by round ====
Round	1	2	3	4	5	6	7	8	9	10	11	12	13	14	15	16	17	18	19	20	21	22	23	24	25	26	27	28	29	30	31	32	33	34	35	36	37	38	39	40	41	42	43	44	45	46
Ground	A	A	H	H	A	A	H	H	A	AH	H	H	A	A	H	A	H	A	H	H	A	H	A	H	A	H	A	A	H	H	H	H	A	A	H	A	H	A	H	H	A	A	H	A	A	H
Result	D	L	L	W	L	L	L	W	D	D	L	D	W	W	W	L	W	W	W	D	L	W	L	D	L	W	D	D	W	W	L	W	D	W	W	L	W	L	D	L	D	L	W	L	L	W
Position	13	19	22	19	20	22	23	20	21	21	22	21	20	18	14	16	14	13	12	13	13	11	12	12	14	12	12	12	9	9	11	10	11	9	8	9	7	9	8	9	9	10	9	9	11	12

Source: 11v11.com
A = Away; H = Home; W = Win; D = Draw; L = Loss

==== League table ====
Pos	Team	Pld	W	D	L	GF	GA	GAv	Pts
10	Gillingham	46	19	10	17	69	71	0.972	48
11	Northampton Town	46	20	7	19	67	71	0.944	47
12	Colchester United	46	18	11	17	76	81	0.938	47
13	Shrewsbury Town	46	17	12	17	69	66	1.045	46
14	Southampton	46	18	8	20	91	81	1.123	44

==== Matches ====
20 August 1955 1	Exeter City	0–0	Colchester United	Exeter
		Report		Stadium: St James Park; Attendance: 11,871

24 August 1955 2	Bournemouth & Boscombe Athletic	3–1	Colchester United	Bournemouth
	Unknown goalscorer	Report	McCurley	Stadium: Dean Court; Attendance: 8,066

27 August 1955 3	Colchester United	3–6	Southend United	Colchester
	McCurley 49', 90' (pen.); Fowler 65'	Report; Report	Baron 40'; Hollis 53', 62', 74', 82'; McGuigan 56'	Stadium: Layer Road; Attendance: 8,915

1 September 1955 4	Colchester United	1–0	Bournemouth & Boscombe Athletic	Colchester
	Fowler	Report		Stadium: Layer Road; Attendance: 6,964

3 September 1955 5	Coventry City	2–0	Colchester United	Coventry
	Unknown goalscorer Own goal o.g.'	Report		Stadium: Highfield Road; Attendance: 23,171

8 September 1955 6	Leyton Orient	6–0	Colchester United	Leyton
	Fenton o.g.' Hartburn pen.' Unknown goalscorer	Report		Stadium: Brisbane Road; Attendance: 13,483

10 September 1955 7	Colchester United	0–3	Brentford	Colchester
		Report	Towers; Taylor	Stadium: Layer Road; Attendance: 7,843

15 September 1955 8	Colchester United	2–1	Leyton Orient	Colchester
	Harrison; McCurley	Report	Unknown goalscorer	Stadium: Layer Road; Attendance: 7,191

17 September 1955 9	Watford	1–1	Colchester United	Watford
	Marden	Report	McCurley	Stadium: Vicarage Road; Attendance: 9,326

21 September 1955 10	Norwich City	1–1	Colchester United	Norwich
	Coxon pen.'	Report	Plant	Stadium: Carrow Road; Attendance: 13,555

24 September 1955 11	Colchester United	0–3	Reading	Colchester
		Report	Unknown goalscorer	Stadium: Layer Road; Attendance: 8,125

29 September 1955 12	Colchester United	1–1	Gillingham	Colchester
	Stewart	Report	Unknown goalscorer	Stadium: Layer Road; Attendance: 5,208

1 October 1955 13	Millwall	0–1	Colchester United	New Cross
		Report	Grice	Stadium: The Den; Attendance: 11,807

8 October 1955 14	Torquay United	1–2	Colchester United	Torquay
	Unknown goalscorer	Report	McCurley; P. Wright	Stadium: Plainmoor; Attendance: 7,419

15 October 1955 15	Colchester United	2–1	Newport County	Colchester
	Plant	Report	Johnston	Stadium: Layer Road; Attendance: 8,225

22 October 1955 16	Swindon Town	3–1	Colchester United	Swindon
	Micklewright; Owen	Report; Report	Plant	Stadium: County Ground; Attendance: 6,373

29 October 1955 17	Colchester United	4–1	Queens Park Rangers	Colchester
	McCurley; Grice	Report	Unknown goalscorer	Stadium: Layer Road; Attendance: 7,339

5 November 1955 18	Northampton Town	0–2	Colchester United	Northampton
		Report	McCurley; Grice	Stadium: County Ground; Attendance: 14,091

12 November 1955 19	Colchester United	4–0	Aldershot	Colchester
	McCurley 10'; P. Wright 17'; McLeod 37'	Report		Stadium: Layer Road; Attendance: 8,695

26 November 1955 20	Colchester United	3–3	Brighton & Hove Albion	Colchester
	McCurley 44', 82', 85'	Report	Foreman; Gordon; Harburn	Stadium: Layer Road; Attendance: 9,010

3 December 1955 21	Southampton	3–0	Colchester United	Southampton
	Hoskins; Day; Reeves	Report		Stadium: The Dell; Attendance: 11,072

17 December 1955 22	Colchester United	5–1	Exeter City	Colchester
	Fenton; Plant; Grice; P. Wright	Report	Unknown goalscorer	Stadium: Layer Road; Attendance: 6,179

24 December 1955 23	Southend United	4–0	Colchester United	Southend-on-Sea
	Baron; Hollis; McGuigan	Report; Report		Stadium: Roots Hall; Attendance: 8,404

26 December 1955 24	Colchester United	3–3	Ipswich Town	Colchester
	McCurley 32'; Plant 70'; Parker 83' (o.g.)	Report; Report	Parker 37', 87' (pen.); Grant 80'	Stadium: Layer Road; Attendance: 13,176; Referee: Ken Aston

27 December 1955 25	Ipswich Town	3–1	Colchester United	Ipswich
	MacLuckie 51'; Blackman 53'; Reed 78'	Report; Report	McCurley 6'	Stadium: Portman Road; Attendance: 22,644

31 December 1955 26	Colchester United	2–0	Coventry City	Colchester
	Plant; McCurley	Report		Stadium: Layer Road; Attendance: 8,618

7 January 1956 27	Crystal Palace	1–1	Colchester United	Selhurst
	Unknown goalscorer	Report	Plant	Stadium: Selhurst Park; Attendance: 6,438

14 January 1956 28	Brentford	2–2	Colchester United	Brentford
	Rainford; Taylor	Report	McCurley; P. Wright	Stadium: Griffin Park; Attendance: 8,492

21 January 1956 29	Colchester United	4–1	Watford	Colchester
	Plant; McCurley; Grice; P. Wright	Report	Brown	Stadium: Layer Road; Attendance: 7,699

28 January 1956 30	Colchester United	2–0	Shrewsbury Town	Colchester
	McCurley; Grice	Report		Stadium: Layer Road; Attendance: 5,679

11 February 1956 31	Colchester United	1–2	Millwall	Colchester
	McLeod	Report	Summers	Stadium: Layer Road; Attendance: 4,811

18 February 1956 32	Colchester United	3–2	Torquay United	Colchester
	Plant	Report	Unknown goalscorer	Stadium: Layer Road; Attendance: 6,906

25 February 1956 33	Newport County	0–0	Colchester United	Newport
		Report		Stadium: Somerton Park; Attendance: 5,588

27 February 1956 34	Reading	1–3	Colchester United	Reading
	Unknown goalscorer	Report	Dale; McCurley; P. Wright	Stadium: Elm Park; Attendance: 4,667

3 March 1956 35	Colchester United	5–0	Swindon Town	Colchester
	Plant 12', 84', 86'; Dale 20'; Fisher 44'	Report; Report		Stadium: Layer Road; Attendance: 6,836

10 March 1956 36	Queens Park Rangers	6–2	Colchester United	Shepherd's Bush
	Unknown goalscorer	Report	McCurley; P. Wright	Stadium: Loftus Road; Attendance: 7,905

17 March 1956 37	Colchester United	2–0	Northampton Town	Colchester
	Plant; McCurley	Report		Stadium: Layer Road; Attendance: 8,333

24 March 1956 38	Aldershot	1–0	Colchester United	Aldershot
	Jackson pen.'	Report		Stadium: Recreation Ground; Attendance: 3,874

30 March 1956 39	Colchester United	1–1	Walsall	Colchester
	McCurley	Report	Unknown goalscorer	Stadium: Layer Road; Attendance: 9,130

31 March 1956 40	Colchester United	2–4	Crystal Palace	Colchester
	Fenton; Bert Hill	Report	Unknown goalscorer	Stadium: Layer Road; Attendance: 7,397

2 April 1956 41	Walsall	0–0	Colchester United	Walsall
		Report		Stadium: Fellows Park; Attendance: 15,179

7 April 1956 42	Brighton & Hove Albion	2–0	Colchester United	Hove
	Harburn; Langley pen.'	Report		Stadium: Goldstone Ground; Attendance: 17,364

14 April 1956 43	Colchester United	3–2	Southampton	Colchester
	Bobby Hill 39'; McCurley 46', 85'	Report	Traynor 3'; Mulgrew 52'	Stadium: Layer Road; Attendance: 5,560

21 April 1956 44	Shrewsbury Town	2–1	Colchester United	Shrewsbury
	Unknown goalscorer	Report	Own goal	Stadium: Gay Meadow; Attendance: 6,967

25 April 1956 45	Gillingham	2–1	Colchester United	Gillingham
	Unknown goalscorer	Report	Plant	Stadium: Priestfield Stadium; Attendance: 5,622

28 April 1956 46	Colchester United	3–2	Norwich City	Colchester
	McCurley; P. Wright	Report	Unknown goalscorer	Stadium: Layer Road; Attendance: 8,004

=== FA Cup ===
19 November 1955 1st round	Torquay United	2–0	Colchester United	Torquay
	Unknown goalscorer	Report		Stadium: Plainmoor; Attendance: 8,823

== Squad statistics ==
=== Appearances and goals ===
No.	Pos	Nat	Player	Total		Third Division South		FA Cup	
No.	Pos	Nat	Player	Apps	Goals	Apps	Goals	Apps	Goals
	GK	(England) ENG	Percy Ames	45	0	44	0	1	0
	GK	(England) ENG	John Wright	2	0	2	0	0	0
	DF	(England) ENG	Brian Dobson	6	0	6	0	0	0
	DF	(England) ENG	George Fisher	43	1	42	1	1	0
	DF	(Scotland) SCO	John Fowler	16	2	16	2	0	0
	DF	(England) ENG	John Harrison	41	1	40	1	1	0
	DF	(England) ENG	Billy Hunt	1	0	1	0	0	0
	DF	(England) ENG	Reg Stewart	42	1	41	1	1	0
	MF	(England) ENG	Bob Dale	40	2	39	2	1	0
	MF	(England) ENG	Benny Fenton	33	2	32	2	1	0
	MF	(England) ENG	Trevor Harris	2	0	2	0	0	0
	MF	(England) ENG	Bert Hill	22	1	22	1	0	0
	MF	(England) ENG	Ron Hunt	3	0	3	0	0	0
	FW	(England) ENG	Russell Blake	5	0	5	0	0	0
	FW	(Scotland) SCO	Bobby Hill	4	1	4	1	0	0
	FW	(England) ENG	Kevin McCurley	47	29	46	29	1	0
	FW	(Scotland) SCO	Sammy McLeod	43	2	42	2	1	0
	FW	(England) ENG	Alfred Noble	1	0	1	0	0	0
	FW	(England) ENG	Ken Plant	37	17	36	17	1	0
	FW	(England) ENG	Peter Wright	46	9	45	9	1	0
Players who appeared for Colchester who left during the season
	FW	(England) ENG	Mike Grice	38	6	37	6	1	0

=== Goalscorers ===
Place	Nationality	Position	Name	Third Division South	FA Cup	Total
1	(England)	CF	Kevin McCurley	29	0	29
2	(England)	CF	Ken Plant	17	0	17
3	(England)	WG	Peter Wright	9	0	9
4	(England)	WG	Mike Grice	6	0	6
5	(England)	WH	Bob Dale	2	0	2
5	(England)	WH	Benny Fenton	2	0	2
5	(Scotland)	FB	John Fowler	2	0	2
5	(Scotland)	IF	Sammy McLeod	2	0	2
9	(England)	FB	George Fisher	1	0	1
9	(England)	FB	John Harrison	1	0	1
9	(England)	WH	Bert Hill	1	0	1
9	(Scotland)	IF	Bobby Hill	1	0	1
9	(England)	CB	Reg Stewart	1	0	1
			Own goals	2	0	2
			TOTALS	76	0	76

=== Clean sheets ===
Number of games goalkeepers kept a clean sheet.

Place	Nationality	Player	Third Division South	FA Cup	Total
1	(England)	Percy Ames	10	0	10
2	(England)	John Wright	1	0	1
		TOTALS	11	0	11

=== Player debuts ===
Players making their first-team Colchester United debut in a fully competitive match.

Position	Nationality	Player	Date	Opponent	Ground	Notes
GK	(England)	Percy Ames	20 August 1955	Exeter City	St James Park	
FB	(Scotland)	John Fowler	20 August 1955	Exeter City	St James Park	
IF	(Scotland)	Sammy McLeod	20 August 1955	Exeter City	St James Park	
CB	(England)	Billy Hunt	27 August 1955	Southend United	Layer Road	
FB	(England)	George Fisher	1 September 1955	Bournemouth & Boscombe Athletic	Layer Road	
WG	(England)	Russell Blake	8 September 1955	Leyton Orient	Brisbane Road	
IF	(England)	Alfred Noble	27 December 1955	Ipswich Town	Portman Road	
CB	(England)	Brian Dobson	24 March 1956	Aldershot	Recreation Ground	
IF	(Scotland)	Bobby Hill	2 April 1956	Walsall	Fellows Park	

== See also ==
- List of Colchester United F.C. seasons
