= 1960–61 Colchester United F.C. season =

Colchester United
1960–61 season
- Chairman: Bill Allen
- Manager: Benny Fenton
- Stadium: Layer Road
- Third Division: 23rd (relegated)
- FA Cup: 2nd round (eliminated by Aldershot)
- League Cup: 2nd round (eliminated by Southampton)
- Top goalscorer: League: Martyn King (23); All: Martyn King (25)
- Highest home attendance: 9,130 v Newcastle United, 10 October 1960
- Lowest home attendance: 3,141 v Chesterfield, 29 April 1961
- Average home league attendance: 5,203
- Biggest win: 5–0 v Maidenhead United, 5 November 1960
- Biggest defeat: 0–5 v Bristol City, 10 September 1960; 2–7 v Tranmere Rovers, 11 March 1961
Home colours

The 1960–61 season was Colchester United's 19th season in their history and their eleventh season in the third tier of English football, the Third Division. Alongside competing in the Third Division, the club also participated in the FA Cup and the new League Cup competition. Colchester reached the second round in both cups, beating Maidenhead United in the first round of the FA Cup before being eliminated by Aldershot. In the League Cup, Colchester hosted First Division Newcastle United in the first round. They won 4–1, but were knocked out by Southampton in round two.

In the league, Colchester had a very poor season. Seven consecutive defeats left the club languishing in the bottom four by early October 1960, and they remained no higher than one place above the relegation positions for the rest of the season. They were relegated for the first time in their history in 23rd position.

== Season overview ==
After gathering just one point in eleven games, Colchester had hit the bottom of the Third Division by October 1960 and never managed to climb out of the bottom five places. Average attendances plummeted, with a new record–low attendance of 3,141 achieved in the final game of the season against Chesterfield. Despite this, Martyn King managed to score a hat–trick in the game, a 4–3 win for Colchester and finished the season with 25 goals to his name. Colchester had conceded a club record 101 goals in the league.

Aside from Colchester's league woes, they did enjoy some success in the inaugural League Cup competition. They hosted First Division Newcastle United at Layer Road and comprehensively beat them 4–1 in front of a season-best 9,130 crowd. In round two, they were beaten 2–0 at home to Southampton. In the FA Cup, Colchester achieved their best win of the season at home to Maidenhead United in the first round, but were dumped out of the cup by Aldershot in round two.

== Players ==
As of match played 29 April 1961.

Name	Position	Nationality	Place of birth	Date of birth	Apps	Goals	Signed from	Date signed	Fee
Goalkeepers
Percy Ames	GK	(England)	Plymouth	13 December 1931 (aged 28)	238	0	(England) Tottenham Hotspur	1 May 1955	Free transfer
John Wright	GK	(England)	Aldershot	13 August 1933 (aged 26)	4	0	(England) Colchester Casuals	23 May 1952	Free transfer
Defenders
Peter Carey	FB	(England)	Barking	14 April 1933 (aged 27)	0	0	(England) Queens Park Rangers	November 1960	Undisclosed
Alan Eagles	FB	(England)	Edgware	6 September 1933 (aged 26)	0	0	(England) Leyton Orient	January 1961	£3,000
John Fowler	FB	(Scotland)	Leith	17 October 1933 (aged 26)	201	3	(Scotland) Bonnyrigg Rose Athletic	20 August 1955 (Note: Date of signing refers to the date of the player's first game for the club)	Free transfer
John Laidlaw	FB	(England)	Aldershot	5 July 1936 (aged 23)	40	1	(Scotland) Easthouses Lily Miners Welfare	June 1957	Free transfer
Alf Marshall	FB	(England)	Dagenham	21 May 1933 (aged 27)	29	0	(England) Dagenham	14 October 1957	£25
Tommy Millar	FB	(Scotland)	Edinburgh	3 December 1938 (aged 21)	5	0	(Scotland) Bo'ness United	July 1959	Free transfer
Edgar Rumney	FB	(England)	Abberton	15 September 1936 (aged 23)	5	0	(England) Colchester Casuals	1 May 1957	Free transfer
Midfielders
Cyril Hammond	WH	(England)	Woolwich	10 October 1927 (aged 32)	81	1	(England) Charlton Athletic	July 1958	Free transfer
Trevor Harris	WH	(England)	Colchester	6 February 1936 (aged 24)	11	0	Amateur	July 1951	Free transfer
Ron Hunt	WH	(England)	Colchester	26 September 1933 (aged 26)	62	0	Amateur	October 1951	Free transfer
Derek Parker	WH	(England)	Wivenhoe	23 June 1926 (aged 33)	124	1	(England) West Ham United	March 1957	£2,500
Forwards
John Baines	CF	(England)	Colchester	25 September 1937 (aged 22)	0	0	(England) Colchester Casuals	January 1960	Free transfer
Bobby Hill	IF	(Scotland)	Edinburgh	9 June 1938 (aged 21)	101	13	(Scotland) Easthouses Lily Miners Welfare	9 June 1955	Free transfer
Tony Howe	WG	(England)	Colchester	14 February 1939 (aged 21)	0	0	(England) Colchester Casuals	March 1960	Free transfer
Bobby Hunt	FW	(England)	Colchester	1 October 1942 (aged 17)	1	1	Amateur	March 1960	Free transfer
Martyn King	CF	(England)	Birmingham	23 August 1937 (aged 22)	46	31	Amateur	Summer 1955	Free transfer
Sammy McLeod	IF	(Scotland)	Glasgow	4 January 1934 (aged 26)	119	19	(Scotland) Easthouses Lily Miners Welfare	20 August 1955	Free transfer
Tony Miller	IF	(England)	Chelmsford	26 October 1937 (aged 22)	0	0	Amateur	May 1958	Free transfer
Tommy Williams	WG	(England)	Battersea	10 February 1935 (aged 25)	118	23	(England) Carshalton Athletic	September 1956	Free transfer
Peter Wright	WG	(England)	Colchester	26 January 1934 (aged 26)	300	63	Amateur	November 1951	Free transfer

== Transfers ==
=== In ===
Date	Position	Nationality	Name	From	Fee	Ref.
November 1960	FB	(England)	Peter Carey	(England) Queens Park Rangers	Undisclosed	
January 1961	FB	(England)	Alan Eagles	(England) Leyton Orient	£3,000	

- Total spending: ▼ ~ £3,000

=== Out ===
Date	Position	Nationality	Name	To	Fee	Ref.
Summer 1960	FB	(England)	George Fisher	(England) Bexleyheath & Welling	Released	
Summer 1960	CF	(England)	Kevin McCurley	(England) Oldham Athletic	Nominal	
June 1960	IF	(England)	John Evans	(England) Romford	Released	
3 April 1961	WG	(England)	Russell Blake	(England) Chelmsford City	Released	(Note: Date of departure refers to the date of the player's final game for the club)
22 April 1961	CB	(Scotland)	Chic Milligan	(England) Clacton Town	Released	
24 April 1961	CF	(England)	Neil Langman	(England) Bath City	Released	

== Match details ==
=== Third Division ===
==== Results round by round ====
Round	1	2	3	4	5	6	7	8	9	10	11	12	13	14	15	16	17	18	19	20	21	22	23	24	25	26	27	28	29	30	31	32	33	34	35	36	37	38	39	40	41	42	43	44	45	46
Ground	H	H	A	A	H	H	A	A	H	A	A	H	H	H	A	H	A	A	H	H	A	A	A	H	H	A	H	H	A	A	H	A	A	H	A	A	H	A	H	H	A	A	H	A	H	H
Result	W	D	L	L	W	W	L	L	L	L	L	L	L	D	L	L	D	W	D	W	W	D	L	D	D	L	L	L	L	L	L	D	L	W	W	L	L	D	L	W	L	D	W	D	L	W
Position	4	1	9	14	13	5	12	15	18	20	23	24	24	23	24	24	24	23	23	22	20	20	20	20	20	22	23	23	23	23	23	23	23	23	22	23	23	24	24	24	24	24	24	24	24	23

Source: 11v11.com
A = Away; H = Home; W = Win; D = Draw; L = Loss

==== League table ====
Pos	Team	Pld	W	D	L	GF	GA	GAv	Pts	Promotion or relegation
20	Southend United	46	14	11	21	60	76	0.789	39	
21	Tranmere Rovers (R)	46	15	8	23	79	115	0.687	38	Relegation to the Fourth Division
22	Bradford City (R)	46	11	14	21	65	87	0.747	36	Relegation to the Fourth Division
23	Colchester United (R)	46	11	11	24	68	101	0.673	33	Relegation to the Fourth Division
24	Chesterfield (R)	46	10	12	24	67	87	0.770	32	Relegation to the Fourth Division

(R) Relegated

==== Matches ====
20 August 1960 1	Colchester United	4–0	Hull City	Colchester
	Hammond (pen.) (pen.); King	Report		Stadium: Layer Road; Attendance: 6,731

22 August 1960 2	Colchester United	1–1	Grimsby Town	Colchester
	King	Report	Unknown goalscorer	Stadium: Layer Road; Attendance: 7,194

27 August 1960 3	Reading	2–1	Colchester United	Reading
	Lacey 15'; Wheeler 66'	Report	Howe 37'	Stadium: Elm Park; Attendance: 7,775

30 August 1960 4	Grimsby Town	2–1	Colchester United	Cleethorpes
	Unknown goalscorer	Report	King	Stadium: Blundell Park; Attendance: 11,000

3 September 1960 5	Colchester United	4–3	Coventry City	Colchester
	Hammond (pen.); King; Langman; Williams	Report	Myerscough; Straw	Stadium: Layer Road; Attendance: 5,431

5 September 1960 6	Colchester United	4–2	Barnsley	Colchester
	Hammond (pen.); King; Howe	Report	Unknown goalscorer	Stadium: Layer Road; Attendance: 6,034

10 September 1960 7	Bristol City	5–0	Colchester United	Bristol
	Unknown goalscorer	Report		Stadium: Ashton Gate Stadium; Attendance: 11,808

14 September 1960 8	Barnsley	3–0	Colchester United	Barnsley
	Unknown goalscorer	Report		Stadium: Oakwell; Attendance: 3,000

17 September 1960 9	Colchester United	0–1	Queens Park Rangers	Colchester
		Report	Unknown goalscorer	Stadium: Layer Road; Attendance: 5,750

20 September 1960 10	Bury	4–0	Colchester United	Bury
	Unknown goalscorer	Report		Stadium: Gigg Lane; Attendance: 9,253

24 September 1960 11	Notts County	4–2	Colchester United	Nottingham
	Unknown goalscorer	Report	Langman; Williams	Stadium: Meadow Lane; Attendance: 14,134

26 September 1960 12	Colchester United	0–2	Bury	Colchester
		Report	Unknown goalscorer	Stadium: Layer Road; Attendance: 5,263

1 October 1960 13	Colchester United	0–1	Bournemouth & Boscombe Athletic	Colchester
		Report	Unknown goalscorer	Stadium: Layer Road; Attendance: 4,576

8 October 1960 14	Colchester United	1–1	Shrewsbury Town	Colchester
	Langman	Report	Unknown goalscorer	Stadium: Layer Road; Attendance: 4,191

15 October 1960 15	Halifax Town	2–1	Colchester United	Halifax
	Unknown goalscorer	Report	King	Stadium: The Shay; Attendance: 6,210

22 October 1960 16	Colchester United	0–3	Tranmere Rovers	Colchester
		Report	Unknown goalscorer	Stadium: Layer Road; Attendance: 4,569

29 October 1960 17	Watford	2–2	Colchester United	Watford
	Bunce; Holton	Report	King; Williams (pen.)	Stadium: Vicarage Road; Attendance: 13,031

12 November 1960 18	Swindon Town	0–2	Colchester United	Swindon
		Report; Report	Langman	Stadium: County Ground; Attendance: 11,782

19 November 1960 19	Colchester United	3–3	Torquay United	Colchester
	B. Hunt; Fowler; Langman	Report	Unknown goalscorer	Stadium: Layer Road; Attendance: 5,483

3 December 1960 20	Colchester United	2–0	Southend United	Colchester
	Langman; Williams	Report; Report		Stadium: Layer Road; Attendance: 5,007

10 December 1960 21	Chesterfield	2–3	Colchester United	Chesterfield
	Havenhand; Frear	Report	Fowler 49'; Harris 88' (pen.); King	Stadium: Saltergate; Attendance: 3,342

17 December 1960 22	Hull City	1–1	Colchester United	Kingston upon Hull
	Sewell	Report	King	Stadium: Boothferry Park; Attendance: 6,047

22 December 1960 23	Newport County	3–2	Colchester United	Newport
	Burton; Meyer	Report	King; Langman	Stadium: Somerton Park; Attendance: 6,182

26 December 1960 24	Colchester United	1–1	Newport County	Colchester
	King	Report	McPherson	Stadium: Layer Road; Attendance: 6,732

31 December 1960 25	Colchester United	2–2	Reading	Colchester
	Langman; Williams	Report	Unknown goalscorer	Stadium: Layer Road; Attendance: 5,252

14 January 1961 26	Coventry City	2–0	Colchester United	Coventry
	Kletzenbauer; Straw	Report		Stadium: Highfield Road; Attendance: 10,197

21 January 1961 27	Colchester United	0–1	Bristol City	Colchester
		Report	Unknown goalscorer	Stadium: Layer Road; Attendance: 5,099

28 January 1961 28	Colchester United	2–4	Brentford	Colchester
	B. Hunt; Williams	Report	Rainford; Bristow; Towers	Stadium: Layer Road; Attendance: 4,040

4 February 1961 29	Queens Park Rangers	3–2	Colchester United	Shepherd's Bush
	Unknown goalscorer	Report	P. Wright; Williams	Stadium: Loftus Road; Attendance: 10,232

6 February 1961 30	Port Vale	3–0	Colchester United	Burslem
	Poole; Portwood	Report		Stadium: Vale Park; Attendance: 6,504

11 February 1961 31	Colchester United	1–2	Notts County	Colchester
	Williams	Report	Unknown goalscorer	Stadium: Layer Road; Attendance: 4,634

18 February 1961 32	Bournemouth & Boscombe Athletic	4–4	Colchester United	Bournemouth
	Unknown goalscorer	Report	Own goal (o.g.); King; McLeod	Stadium: Dean Court; Attendance: 6,712

25 February 1961 33	Southend United	2–1	Colchester United	Southend-on-Sea
	Fryatt; McKinven	Report; Report	Eagles	Stadium: Roots Hall; Attendance: 6,047

4 March 1961 34	Colchester United	3–1	Halifax Town	Colchester
	McLeod; Harris (pen.)	Report	Unknown goalscorer	Stadium: Layer Road; Attendance: 4,710

7 March 1961 35	Bradford City	0–1	Colchester United	Bradford
		Report	King	Stadium: Valley Parade; Attendance: 7,590

11 March 1961 36	Tranmere Rovers	7–2	Colchester United	Birkenhead
	Unknown goalscorer	Report	Own goal (o.g.); King	Stadium: Prenton Park; Attendance: 11,299

18 March 1961 37	Colchester United	1–4	Watford	Colchester
	Langman	Report	Bunce; Nicholas; Walker	Stadium: Layer Road; Attendance: 4,648

25 March 1961 38	Brentford	0–0	Colchester United	Brentford
		Report		Stadium: Griffin Park; Attendance: 4,600

31 March 1961 39	Colchester United	0–4	Walsall	Colchester
		Report	Unknown goalscorer	Stadium: Layer Road; Attendance: 5,480

1 April 1961 40	Colchester United	3–1	Swindon Town	Colchester
	B. Hunt 27'; King 52'; P. Wright 75'	Report; Report	Woodruff 2'	Stadium: Layer Road; Attendance: 3,182; Referee: A. Sturgeon

3 April 1961 41	Walsall	3–0	Colchester United	Walsall
	Unknown goalscorer	Report		Stadium: Fellows Park; Attendance: 12,985

8 April 1961 42	Torquay United	1–1	Colchester United	Torquay
	Unknown goalscorer	Report	Hill	Stadium: Plainmoor; Attendance: 4,047

15 April 1961 43	Colchester United	2–0	Port Vale	Colchester
	King	Report		Stadium: Layer Road; Attendance: 3,500

22 April 1961 44	Shrewsbury Town	2–2	Colchester United	Shrewsbury
	McLaughlin 30'; Baker 55'	Report	R. Hunt 27'; B. Hunt 59'	Stadium: Gay Meadow; Attendance: 6,891

24 April 1961 45	Colchester United	2–4	Bradford City	Colchester
	Langman; P. Wright	Report	Unknown goalscorer	Stadium: Layer Road; Attendance: 3,542

29 April 1961 46	Colchester United	4–3	Chesterfield	Colchester
	Own goal (o.g.); King	Report	Unknown goalscorer	Stadium: Layer Road; Attendance: 3,141

=== League Cup ===
10 October 1960 1st round	Colchester United	4–1	Newcastle United	Colchester
	Williams 2'; King 4', 85'; P. Wright 44'	Report	Neale 46'	Stadium: Layer Road; Attendance: 9,130

31 October 1960 2nd round	Colchester United	0–2	Southampton	Colchester
		Report	Paine; Sydenham	Stadium: Layer Road; Attendance: 6,264

=== FA Cup ===
5 November 1960 1st round	Colchester United	5–0	Maidenhead United	Colchester
	B. Hunt 43', 76'; Langman 44', 78'; Williams 86'	Report		Stadium: Layer Road; Attendance: 5,771

26 November 1960 2nd round	Aldershot	3–1	Colchester United	Aldershot
	Kirkup 20', 77', 79'	Report	Hill 51'	Stadium: Recreation Ground; Attendance: 8,425

== Squad statistics ==
=== Appearances and goals ===
No.	Pos	Nat	Player	Total		Third Division		FA Cup		League Cup	
No.	Pos	Nat	Player	Apps	Goals	Apps	Goals	Apps	Goals	Apps	Goals
	GK	(England) ENG	Percy Ames	49	0	45	0	2	0	2	0
	GK	(England) ENG	John Wright	1	0	1	0	0	0	0	0
	DF	(England) ENG	Peter Carey	10	0	10	0	0	0	0	0
	DF	(England) ENG	Alan Eagles	16	1	16	1	0	0	0	0
	DF	(Scotland) SCO	John Fowler	49	2	45	2	2	0	2	0
	DF	(England) ENG	John Laidlaw	2	0	2	0	0	0	0	0
	DF	(England) ENG	Alf Marshall	1	0	1	0	0	0	0	0
	DF	(Scotland) SCO	Tommy Millar	17	0	14	0	2	0	1	0
	DF	(England) ENG	Edgar Rumney	18	0	17	0	0	0	1	0
	MF	(England) ENG	Cyril Hammond	19	4	19	4	0	0	0	0
	MF	(England) ENG	Trevor Harris	31	2	27	2	2	0	2	0
	MF	(England) ENG	Ron Hunt	32	1	28	1	2	0	2	0
	MF	(England) ENG	Derek Parker	14	0	14	0	0	0	0	0
	FW	(England) ENG	John Baines	3	0	3	0	0	0	0	0
	FW	(Scotland) SCO	Bobby Hill	37	2	33	1	2	1	2	0
	FW	(England) ENG	Tony Howe	10	2	10	2	0	0	0	0
	FW	(England) ENG	Bobby Hunt	29	6	27	4	2	2	0	0
	FW	(England) ENG	Martyn King	41	25	38	23	1	0	2	2
	FW	(Scotland) SCO	Sammy McLeod	22	3	20	3	1	0	1	0
	FW	(England) ENG	Tommy Williams	40	10	36	8	2	1	2	1
	FW	(England) ENG	Peter Wright	23	4	21	3	0	0	2	1
Players who appeared for Colchester who left during the season
	DF	(Scotland) SCO	Chic Milligan	42	0	38	0	2	0	2	0
	FW	(England) ENG	Russell Blake	7	0	7	0	0	0	0	0
	FW	(England) ENG	Neil Langman	37	13	34	11	2	2	1	0

=== Goalscorers ===
Place	Nationality	Position	Name	Third Division	FA Cup	League Cup	Total
1	(England)	CF	Martyn King	23	0	2	25
2	(England)	CF	Neil Langman	11	2	0	13
3	(England)	WG	Tommy Williams	8	1	1	10
4	(England)	FW	Bobby Hunt	4	2	0	6
5	(England)	WH	Cyril Hammond	4	0	0	4
5	(England)	WG	Peter Wright	3	0	1	4
7	(Scotland)	IF	Sammy McLeod	3	0	0	3
8	(Scotland)	FB	John Fowler	2	0	0	2
8	(England)	WH	Trevor Harris	2	0	0	2
8	(Scotland)	IF	Bobby Hill	1	1	0	2
8	(England)	WG	Tony Howe	2	0	0	2
12	(England)	FB	Alan Eagles	1	0	0	1
12	(England)	WH	Ron Hunt	1	0	0	1
			Own goals	3	0	0	3
			TOTALS	68	6	4	78

=== Clean sheets ===
Number of games goalkeepers kept a clean sheet.

Place	Nationality	Player	Third Division	FA Cup	League Cup	Total
1	(England)	Percy Ames	6	1	0	7
		TOTALS	6	1	0	7

=== Player debuts ===
Players making their first-team Colchester United debut in a fully competitive match.

Position	Nationality	Player	Date	Opponent	Ground	Notes
WG	(England)	Tony Howe	20 August 1960	Hull City	Layer Road	
FB	(England)	Peter Carey	14 January 1961	Coventry City	Highfield Road	
FB	(England)	Alan Eagles	14 January 1961	Coventry City	Highfield Road	
CF	(England)	John Baines	4 March 1961	Halifax Town	Layer Road	

== See also ==
- List of Colchester United F.C. seasons
