= 1955–56 Arsenal F.C. season =

English football club season

Arsenal
1955–56 season
- Chairman: Bracewell Smith
- Manager: Tom Whittaker
- First Division: 5th
- FA Cup: Sixth round
Home colours	Away colours

During the 1955–56 English football season, Arsenal F.C. competed in the Football League First Division.

== Final league table ==
Pos	Team	Pld	W	D	L	GF	GA	GAv	Pts
3	Wolverhampton Wanderers	42	20	9	13	89	65	1.369	49
4	Manchester City	42	18	10	14	82	69	1.188	46
5	Arsenal	42	18	10	14	60	61	0.984	46
6	Birmingham City	42	18	9	15	75	57	1.316	45
7	Burnley	42	18	8	16	64	54	1.185	44

Source: World Football
Rules for classification: 1) Points; 2) Goal average; 3) Goals scored

== Results ==
Arsenal's score comes first

=== Legend ===
Win	Draw	Loss

=== Football League First Division ===
Date	Opponent	Venue	Result	Attendance	Scorers
20 August 1955	Blackpool	A	1–3	30,928	
23 August 1955	Cardiff City	H	3–1	31,361	
27 August 1955	Chelsea	H	1–1	56,034	
31 August 1955	Manchester City	A	2–2	36,955	
3 September 1955	Bolton Wanderers	A	1–4	26,325	
6 September 1955	Manchester City	H	0–0	30,862	
10 September 1955	Tottenham Hotspur	A	1–3	51,029	
17 September 1955	Portsmouth	H	1–3	48,816	
24 September 1955	Sunderland	A	1–3	55,397	
1 October 1955	Aston Villa	H	1–0	43,854	
8 October 1955	Everton	A	1–1	47,794	
15 October 1955	Newcastle United	H	1–0	47,149	
22 October 1955	Luton Town	A	0–0	24,009	
29 October 1955	Charlton Athletic	H	2–4	47,138	
5 November 1955	Manchester United	A	1–1	41,836	
12 November 1955	Sheffield United	H	2–1	46,647	
19 November 1955	Preston North End	A	1–0	23,033	
26 November 1955	Burnley	H	0–1	37,583	
3 December 1955	Birmingham City	A	0–4	35,765	
10 December 1955	West Bromwich Albion	H	2–0	36,337	
17 December 1955	Blackpool	H	4–1	45,086	
24 December 1955	Chelsea	A	0–2	43,022	
26 December 1955	Wolverhampton Wanderers	A	3–3	43,738	
27 December 1955	Wolverhampton Wanderers	H	2–2	61,814	
31 December 1955	Bolton Wanderers	H	3–1	43,757	
14 January 1956	Tottenham Hotspur	H	0–1	60,606	
21 January 1956	Portsmouth	A	2–5	30,513	
4 February 1956	Sunderland	H	3–1	38,780	
11 February 1956	Aston Villa	A	1–1	28,060	
21 February 1956	Everton	H	3–2	16,039	
25 February 1956	Newcastle United	A	0–2	50,822	
6 March 1956	Preston North End	H	3–2	34,617	
10 March 1956	Charlton Athletic	A	0–2	40,553	
17 March 1956	Manchester United	H	1–1	50,758	
24 March 1956	Sheffield United	A	2–0	26,347	
31 March 1956	Luton Town	H	3–0	45,968	
2 April 1956	Huddersfield Town	H	2–0	30,836	
3 April 1956	Huddersfield Town	A	1–0	24,469	
7 April 1956	Burnley	A	1–0	24,393	
14 April 1956	Birmingham City	H	1–0	31,775	
21 April 1956	West Bromwiich Albion	A	1–2	26,395	
28 April 1956	Cardiff City	A	2–1	23,169	

=== FA Cup ===
Round	Date	Opponent	Venue	Result	Attendance	Goalscorers
R3	7 January 1956	Bedford Town	H	2–2	55,178	
R3 R	12 January 1956	Bedford Town	A	2–1	15,306	
R4	28 January 1956	Aston Villa	H	4–1	43,052	Groves 4'; Tapscott (2) 20', 44'; Charlton 60' (pen.)
R5	18 February 1956	Charlton Athletic	A	2–0	71,758	
R6	3 March 1956	Birmingham City	H	1–3	67,872	

== Squad ==
Note: Flags indicate national team as defined under FIFA eligibility rules; some limited exceptions apply. Players may hold more than one non-FIFA nationality.

Pos.	Nation	Player
GK	WAL	Jack Kelsey
GK	ENG	Con Sullivan
DF	WAL	Walley Barnes
DF	ENG	Stan Charlton
DF	ENG	Dennis Evans
DF	ENG	Len Wills
MF	ENG	Jimmy Bloomfield
MF	WAL	Dave Bowen
MF	ENG	Danny Clapton
MF	NIR	Bill Dickson
MF	ENG	Bill Dodgin
MF	SCO	Alex Forbes
MF	SCO	Jim Fotheringham
MF	IRL	Joe Haverty

Pos.	Nation	Player
MF	ENG	Mike Tiddy
MF	ENG	Gerry Ward
FW	ENG	Peter Goring
FW	ENG	Vic Groves
FW	SCO	David Herd
FW	ENG	Cliff Holton
FW	ENG	Tommy Lawton
FW	ENG	Doug Lishman
FW	ENG	Gordon Nutt
FW	ENG	Don Roper
FW	ENG	Ray Swallow
FW	WAL	Derek Tapscott
FW	ENG	Brian Walsh
