= Stanley Charlton =

Stanley or Stan Charlton may refer to:

- Stan Charlton Sr. (1900–1971), English footballer
- Stan Charlton (1929–2012), English footballer
