= Bernard Moore (footballer) =

English association football player

Personal information
- Full name: Bernard John Moore
- Date of birth: 18 December 1923
- Place of birth: Brighton, England
- Date of death: 20 July 2014 (aged 90)
- Place of death: Bedford, England
- Height: 5 ft 10 in (1.78 m)
- Position: Centre forward

Youth career
- Brighton & Hove Albion

Senior career*
Years	Team	Apps	(Gls)
1942–1948	Brighton & Hove Albion	10	(2)
1948–1951	Hastings United		
1951–1954	Luton Town	74	(31)
1954–1955	Brighton & Hove Albion	29	(10)
1955–1956	Bedford Town	23	(12)
1956–1958	Cambridge United		
1958–19??	Potton United (player-manager)		
- Dunstable Town
- * Club domestic league appearances and goals

Bernard John Moore (18 December 1923 – 20 July 2014) was an English professional footballer who played as a centre forward in the Football League for Brighton & Hove Albion (two spells) and Luton Town. He also played non-league football for Hastings United, Bedford Town, Cambridge United, Potton United and Dunstable Town.

== Life and career ==
Moore was born in 1923 in Brighton, where he attended Brighton Intermediate School and played football for Brighton Boys. According to that team's secretary, "Moore was a lightweight and relied on brains rather than brawn. He was a very clever player and never averse to a shot at goal from the edge of the area." When he left school, he began an apprenticeship as a toolmaker and joined Brighton & Hove Albion as a junior.

He turned professional in 1945, and made his senior debut in the 1945–46 FA Cup, but his progress was interrupted by service as a Physical Training Instructor with the Royal Air Force in India and the Far East, and he finally made an appearance in the Third Division South in 1947–48. He scored twice from eight league matches before joining the newly formed Southern League club Hastings United in October 1948. The move was intended as a loan, but mistakes were made with the paperwork and Moore had signed a permanent contract.

Moore scored prolifically for Hastings, with 138 goals from 121 matches. According to the club's 40th anniversary souvenir volume, he arrived to "add sparkle to the attack", and "his skills helped to keep gates healthy", but not healthy enough: in his third season, with Hastings in severe financial difficulty, Luton Town of the Football League Second Division paid "a much-needed £4,000", which was then a Southern League record, for his services.

He scored on debut for Luton, and followed up with 6 goals from his next 12 appearances as the team avoided relegation from the second tier. He was injured early in the new season, and when he recovered he played more for the reserve team than the first team. In 1952–53, Moore was moved to inside right to accommodate the arrival of former England international centre-forward Jesse Pye and by the end of November, he had 10 goals. By March he was back in the reserves, as Luton went on to finish third in the table, and the following season, he was allowed to leave.

In March 1954, Brighton & Hove Albion paid £3,000 for Moore's services. While not as prolific as in his youth, he still scored a goal in every three games. He fell out of favour with manager Billy Lane, and in November 1955, he returned to the Southern League with Bedford Town.

Moore was a regular in the Bedford side that reached the third round of the 1955–56 FA Cup, in which they faced Arsenal at Highbury. Bedford came back from two goals down to draw the match: with six minutes to go, "Adey's centre from the left was flicked by Yates over the groping hands of Sullivan and Moore drove the ball home." He played in the replay which Bedford for most of the second half before the First Division side equalised and then secured the win in extra time. The Daily Herald wrote that Arsenal's centre half, Jim Fotheringham, "looked crude and clumsy" against Moore. By the end of the season he had lost his place. He made two appearances in the early part of the next before moving on to Cambridge United, where he again played alongside a former England player, this time Wilf Mannion. He spent time as player-manager of Potton United, and also played for Dunstable Town.

After leaving the professional game Moore updated his toolmaking skills and taught metalwork in Bedford schools until he retired in 1988. He remained in the Bedford area, where he died at his Putnoe home in 2014 at the age of 90. He and his wife, Daphne, had two daughters, Lesley and Bernadette.

== Career statistics ==
Appearances and goals by club, season and competition
Club	Season	League			FA Cup		Other		Total	
Club	Season	Division	Apps	Goals	Apps	Goals	Apps	Goals	Apps	Goals
Brighton & Hove Albion	1945–46	—			9	1	—		9	1
Brighton & Hove Albion	1946–47	Third Division South	0	0	0	0	—		0	0
Brighton & Hove Albion	1947–48	Third Division South	8	2	0	0	—		8	2
Brighton & Hove Albion	1947–48	Third Division South	0	0	0	0	—		0	0
Brighton & Hove Albion	Total		8	2	9	1	—		17	3
Luton Town	Total		74	31			—		74	31
Brighton & Hove Albion	1953–54	Third Division South	7	2	0	0	—		7	2
Brighton & Hove Albion	1954–55	Third Division South	22	8	5	1	—		27	9
Brighton & Hove Albion	1955–56	Third Division South	0	0	0	0	—		0	0
Brighton & Hove Albion	Total		29	10	5	1	—		34	11
Bedford Town	1955–56	Southern League	22	12	3	1	2 (Note: Appearances in Bedfordshire Premier Cup)	4	27	17
Bedford Town	1956–57	Southern League	1	0	0	0	1 (Note: Appearance in East Anglian Cup)	0	2	0
Bedford Town	Total		23	12	3	1	3	4	29	17
Career total			134	55	17	3	3	4	154	62
