= Bernard Moore =

Bernard Moore may refer to:

- Bernard Moore (poet) (1873–1953), British poet
- Bernard Moore (burgess), sometime member of the Virginia House of Burgesses
- Bernard Moore (potter) (1850–1935)
- Bernard Moore (footballer) (1923–2014), English footballer
