= Alfred Noble =

Alfred Noble may refer to:

- Alfred Noble (engineer) (1844–1914), American civil engineer
- Alfred H. Noble (1894–1983), American Marine Corps general
- Alfred Noble (footballer) (1924–1999), English footballer

== See also ==
- Alfred Nobel (1833–1896), Swedish chemist and inventor, creator of the Nobel Prize
