= Peter Carey =

Peter Carey may refer to:

- Peter Carey (Australian rules footballer) (born 1954), Australian rules player for Glenelg
- Peter Carey (English footballer) (born 1933), English footballer
- Peter Carey (historian) (born 1948), British historian of south-east Asia
- Peter Carey (novelist) (born 1943), Australian novelist
- Peter Carey (umpire), Australian rules umpire
- Peter G. Carey (1828–1897), American politician from Pennsylvania
- "Black Peter" Carey, a fictional character in The Adventure of Black Peter, a Sherlock Holmes story by Sir Arthur Conan Doyle
