= London XI =

Former association football team in England

- Founded: 1955
- Dissolved: 1958
- Ground: Various
- Manager: Joe Mears
- League: Inter-Cities Fairs Cup
- 1955–58: Runners-up
Home colours	Away colours

The London XI was a football team that represented the city of London in the 1955–58 Inter-Cities Fairs Cup.

The competition began in 1955, and the first tournament took three years to complete. The entrants were the major football team of each city which held a Trade Fair. Like many cities taking part, London had several strong teams; however, rules stated that there could only be a single team from each city. Therefore, a representative team was created especially for the tournament, using the best players from the 11 London-area Football League clubs. Membership of the team varied considerably between matches, and some 54 players took part in the team's eight-match campaign.

The London XI, managed by Chelsea chairman Joe Mears, reached the final of the cup, after coming top of a group that included special XI teams from Basel and Frankfurt, and then beating Lausanne Sports. London lost 8–2 on aggregate over two legs to FC Barcelona.

The London XI only competed in the 1955–58 Inter-Cities Fairs Cup. Thereafter, London was represented in the competition by individual clubs who qualified.

A unified London side competed in friendly matches even earlier: a "London" team represented the FA in the historic 1866 London v Sheffield match, there were several challenges against the Glasgow FA during the 1880s, and "London" lost 4-2 to Corinthians on 21 November 1903 in front of 1500, described as Corinthians "had an easy task" in a 1904 Times article. Two other matches have been referenced – an "annual match" versus Birmingham on 3 October 1910 and a match versus Paris on 18 December 1910.

== Teams and match details ==
Clubs represented

- Arsenal
- Brentford
- Charlton Athletic
- Chelsea
- Crystal Palace
- Fulham
- Leyton Orient
- Millwall
- Queens Park Rangers
- Tottenham Hotspur
- West Ham United

=== Group stage ===
4 June 1955

Basel XI (Switzerland)	0–5	(England) London XI
		Firmani 35'; Holton 37', 43', 74'; Hooper 81' (Note: Some sources give the final goal to Eddie Firmani.)

St. Jakob Stadium, Basel

Team
Ron Reynolds (Tottenham), Peter Sillett (Chelsea), Jim Fotheringham (Arsenal), Stan Willemse (Chelsea), Ken Armstrong (Chelsea), Derek Saunders (Chelsea), Harry Hooper (West Ham), Johnny Haynes (Fulham), Cliff Holton (Arsenal), Eddie Firmani (Charlton), Billy Kiernan (Charlton).
Substitute: Brian Nicholas (QPR), on for Saunders 37′.

26 October 1955

London XI (England)	3–2	(West Germany) Frankfurt XI
Jezzard 46', 76'; Robson 60'		Pfaff 25'; Kaufhold 30'

Wembley Stadium, London

Team
Ted Ditchburn (Tottenham), Peter Sillett (Chelsea), Stan Willemse (Chelsea), Danny Blanchflower (Tottenham), Charlie Hurley (Millwall), Cyril Hammond (Charlton), Vic Groves (Orient), Bobby Robson (Fulham), Bedford Jezzard (Fulham), Roy Bentley (Chelsea), Charlie Mitten (Fulham).

4 May 1956

London XI (England)	1–0	(Switzerland) Basel XI
Robb 87'

White Hart Lane, London

Team
Jack Kelsey (Arsenal), Peter Sillett (Chelsea), John Hewie (Charlton), Danny Blanchflower (Tottenham), Stan Wicks (Chelsea), Ken Coote (Brentford), Jim Lewis (Chelsea), Derek Tapscott (Arsenal), Cliff Holton (Arsenal), Bobby Cameron (QPR), George Robb (Tottenham).

27 March 1957

Frankfurt XI (West Germany)	1–0	(England) London XI
Preisendorfer 72'

Waldstadion, Frankfurt am Main

Team
Ron Reynolds (Tottenham), John Bond (West Ham), Peter Sillett (Chelsea), Ken Armstrong (Chelsea), Malcolm Allison (West Ham), Tony Marchi (Tottenham), Terry Medwin (Tottenham), Stuart Leary (Charlton), David Herd (Arsenal), Johnny Haynes (Fulham), Billy Kiernan (Charlton).

=== Semi-finals ===
16 September 1957

Lausanne XI (Switzerland)	2–1	(England) London XI
Vonlanden 6', 74'		Haverty 70'

Stade Olympique de la Pontaise, Lausanne

Team
Ted Ditchburn (Tottenham), Stan Charlton (Arsenal), Dennis Evans (Arsenal), Brian Nicholas (Chelsea), Jim Fotheringham (Arsenal), Phil McKnight (Orient), Peter Berry (Crystal Palace), Geoff Truett (Crystal Palace), Les Stubbs (Chelsea), Phil Woosnam (Orient), Joe Haverty (Arsenal).

23 October 1957

London XI (England)	2–0	(Switzerland) Lausanne XI
Greaves 10'; Holton 76'

Highbury, London

Team
Jack Kelsey (Arsenal), Stan Charlton (Arsenal), Peter Sillett (Chelsea), Ken Coote (Brentford), Bill Dodgin (Arsenal), Derek Saunders (Chelsea), Roy Dwight (Fulham), Jimmy Greaves (Chelsea), Cliff Holton (Arsenal), Johnny Haynes (Fulham), Billy Kiernan (Charlton).

London XI won 3–2 on aggregate.

=== Final ===
==== First leg ====
5 March 1958

London XI (England)	2–2	(Spain) Barcelona XI
Greaves 10'; Langley 88' (pen.)		Martínez 7'; Tejada 35'

Stamford Bridge, London

Team: Jack Kelsey (Arsenal), Peter Sillett (Chelsea), Jim Langley (Fulham), Danny Blanchflower (Tottenham), Maurice Norman (Tottenham), Ken Coote (Brentford), Vic Groves (Arsenal), Jimmy Greaves (Chelsea), Bobby Smith (Tottenham), Johnny Haynes (Fulham), George Robb (Tottenham).

==== Second leg ====
1 May 1958

Barcelona XI (Spain)	6–0	(England) London XI
Suárez 6', 8'; Martínez 42'; Evaristo 52', 75'; Vergés 63'

Camp Nou, Barcelona

Team: Jack Kelsey (Arsenal), George Wright (West Ham), Noel Cantwell (West Ham), Danny Blanchflower (Tottenham), Ken Brown (West Ham), Dave Bowen (Arsenal), Terry Medwin (Tottenham), Vic Groves (Arsenal), Bobby Smith (Tottenham), Jimmy Bloomfield (Arsenal), Jim Lewis (Chelsea).

Barcelona XI won 8–2 on aggregate.

== London v Glasgow ==
- 8 matches played;
- London: 2 wins (15 goals);
- Glasgow: 5 wins (27 goals);
- 1 draw.

#	Date	Venue	Att.	Score	London goalscorers	Ref.
1	20 January 1883	Hampden (I) (A)	5,000	0–4		
2	15 December 1883	The Oval (H)	3,500	3–2		
3	20 December 1884	Hampden (II) (A)	5,000	2–6		
4	5 December 1885	The Oval (H)	2,000	2–5		
5	27 November 1886	Hampden (II) (A)	4,000	2–2		
6	3 March 1888	The Oval (H)		3–0	Tinsley Lindley; J. Burns (2)	
7	23 March 1889	Hampden (II) (A)		1–5	scrimmage	
8	25 January 1890	The Oval (H)		2–3		

== See also ==
- Football in London
- Football in England
- List of football clubs in England
- Copenhagen XI
- Madrid autonomous football team
