= Derek Digby =

English footballer (1931-2005)

Personal information
- Full name: Derek Francis Digby
- Date of birth: 14 March 1931
- Place of birth: Teignmouth, England
- Date of death: 27 September 2005 (aged 74)
- Place of death: Ledbury, Herefordshire, England
- Height: 5 ft 6 in (1.68 m)
- Position: Outside forward

Youth career
- Dawlish Town

Senior career*
Years	Team	Apps	(Gls)
1949–1953	Exeter City	31	(2)
1953–1955	Southampton	215	(2)
1955–19??	Ledbury Town		
- Welwyn Garden City
- * Club domestic league appearances and goals

Derek Francis Digby (14 March 1931 – 27 September 2005) was an English footballer who played as an outside-forward in the 1950s for Exeter City and Southampton.

== Football career ==
Digby was born in Teignmouth in Devon and started his football career at nearby Dawlish Town before joining Exeter City in August 1949. He made his first-team debut during the 1951–52 season, going on to make 31 appearances in the Football League Third Division South.

In September 1953, he refused to accept the new contract offered by Exeter, and was signed by George Roughton who had managed Exeter until March 1952, and was now in charge at fellow Third Division side, Southampton. He was immediately drafted into the first team, replacing John Hoskins at outside-left. Described as "quick on his toes", he made an encouraging debut against Colchester United on 23 September, setting up the winning goal for Henry Horton. Despite this promise, he was unable to secure a regular place in the side, with Hoskins returning after six matches. From mid-November onwards, Digby made five further appearances, including three at outside-right in place of John Flood.

In the 1954–55 season, Digby was unable to dislodge Hoskins and Flood from their places on the wing, making only four appearances, two on the left in September and two on the right in December, and was released in the summer of 1955.

He then dropped into non-league football, first with Ledbury Town and later at Welwyn Garden City.

== Bibliography ==
- Holley, Duncan; Chalk, Gary (2003). In That Number – A post-war chronicle of Southampton FC. Hagiology Publishing. ISBN 0-9534474-3-X.
- Hugman, Barry (1981). Football League Players Records (1946–1981). Aylesbury: Rothmans Publications. ISBN 0-907574-08-4.
