= Bert Hoskins =

English footballer and manager (1885-1968)

Personal information
- Full name: Albert Herbert Hoskins
- Date of birth: March 1885
- Place of birth: Southampton, England
- Date of death: 19 February 1968 (aged 82)
- Place of death: Southampton, England
- Height: 5 ft 9 in (1.75 m)
- Position: Forward

Youth career
- St. Mary's Guild

Senior career*
Years	Team	Apps	(Gls)
- Freemantle
1904–1908	Southampton	21	(0)
1908–1910	Wolverhampton Wanderers	14	(2)
- Dudley Town
- Shrewsbury Town
1913–1914	Wrexham	6	(2)

Managerial career
- 1924–1926: Wolverhampton Wanderers
- 1926–1929: Gillingham
- * Club domestic league appearances and goals

Albert Herbert Hoskins (March 1885 – 19 February 1968) was an English football forward and football manager, who managed Wolverhampton Wanderers and Gillingham.

== Playing career ==
Born in Southampton, England, Hoskins first played for Freemantle, where he was noticed by Southampton when playing against them in a reserve fixture in 1904. He joined the Saints shortly after and made his debut on Christmas Day 1906. According to Holley & Chalk's "The Alphabet of the Saints he was "always on the brink of establishing himself in the first eleven". He failed to score in any of his 21 Southern League appearances, but did score in each of his three FA Cup matches.

He moved to Wolverhampton Wanderers in May 1908. He played 14 league games in the 1908–09 and 1909–10 seasons, before playing for Dudley Town, Shrewsbury Town and Wrexham.

== Management career ==
He joined the office staff at Wolves and eventually became the club secretary in 1922. As secretary he also acted as assistant to Wolves' managers Jack Addenbrooke and George Jobey, taking over as manager in May 1924, combining his secretarial duties with those of managing the playing side, as was the norm at the time.

His first season in charge at Molineux saw Wolves finish sixth in Division Two, a vast improvement on the previous post-war seasons. The following season, Wolves continued to challenge at the top of the table; they would eventually finish in 4th place, but Hoskins surprisingly left Molineux to take up the secretary-manager's post at Gillingham in March 1926. He spent almost three seasons at Gillingham, with the side always struggling in the lower reaches of Division Three (South) and left in 1929.

Following his departure from Gillingham, Hoskins was announced in the press as the new manager of Torquay United. However, he never actually took up the role at Plainmoor which was given instead to Frank Womack. He later worked as a trainer, coach and scout for a number of non-league sides up to the start of the war in 1939, at which point he left football.

== Family ==
His great-nephew, John played as a forward for Southampton and Swindon Town in the 1950s.

== Bibliography ==
- Edwards, Leigh; Gibbes, Jon; Lovis, John (1999). Torquay United: The Official Centenary History, 1899–1999. Yore Publications. ISBN 1-874427-38-0.
- Holley, Duncan; Chalk, Gary (1992). The Alphabet of the Saints. ACL & Polar Publishing. ISBN 0-9514862-3-3.
- Holley, Duncan; Chalk, Gary (2003). In That Number – A post-war chronicle of Southampton FC. Hagiology Publishing. ISBN 0-9534474-3-X.
- Joyce, Michael (2004). Football League Players' Records 1888 to 1939. Nottingham: Tony Brown. ISBN 1-899468-67-6.
- Turner, Dennis; White, Alex (1993). Football Managers. Breedon Books. ISBN 1-873626-32-0.
