= Alan Eagles =

English footballer (1933-1995

Personal information
- Full name: Alan James Eagles
- Date of birth: 6 September 1933
- Place of birth: Edgware, London, England
- Date of death: 6 November 1995 (aged 62)
- Place of death: Tenby, Wales
- Position: Full-back

Senior career*
Years	Team	Apps	(Gls)
- Carshalton Athletic
1957–1961	Leyton Orient	75	(0)
1961	Colchester United	16	(1)
1961	Queens Park Rangers	0	(0)
1961–1963	Aldershot	15	(1)
- Yiewsley
- Deal Town
- Gravesend & Northfleet
- Pembroke Borough
Total		106	(2)
- * Club domestic league appearances and goals

Alan James Eagles (6 September 1933 – 6 November 1995) was an English footballer who played as a full-back in the Football League for Leyton Orient, Colchester United and Aldershot. He made over 100 appearances in the Football League between 1957 and 1963.

== Career ==
Born in Edgware, London, Eagles began his career with Carshalton Athletic. He joined Football League club Leyton Orient in 1957, making 75 league appearances for the club.

In January 1961, Eagles moved to Colchester United, where he spent the second half of the 1960–61 season, making 16 appearances and scoring one goal. He made his debut for the U's on 14 January in a 2–0 loss to Coventry City, and made his final appearance on 3 April 1961 in a 3–0 defeat by Walsall. His solitary goal for Colchester came on 25 February in an Essex derby match against Southend United, which the U's lost 2–1.

On leaving Colchester, Eagles joined Queens Park Rangers, but failed to make an appearance, moving to Aldershot instead and making 15 appearances between 1961 and 1963, scoring once. He went on to play for non-league clubs Yiewsley, Deal Town and Gravesend & Northfleet.

Eagles later moved to Tenby, Wales, where he became the harbourmaster and played for non-league club Pembroke Borough. Eagles died on 6 November 1995 aged 62.
