= Billy Kiernan =

English footballer

Personal information
- Date of birth: 22 May 1925
- Place of birth: Croydon, England
- Date of death: 3 April 2006 (aged 80)
- Place of death: Pembury, England
- Position: Outside left

Senior career*
Years	Team	Apps	(Gls)
1947–1949	HKFC	?	(?)
1949–1961	Charlton Athletic	378	(87)
1961–1963	Guildford City	?	(?)

International career
	England B national football team	1	(0)
- * Club domestic league appearances and goals

William E. Kiernan (22 May 1925 – 3 April 2006) was an English footballer.

Kiernan began his career with Charlton Athletic when Jimmy Seed signed him as an amateur in 1943. However, he made no impact at the club and following his release he joined the Royal Ulster Rifles. He served in India and Hong Kong and whilst stationed in the latter played for Hong Kong where his performances caught the eye of Charlton again. A versatile midfielder, Kiernan established himself as a Charlton regular for most of his career and became the club's sixth highest scorer of all time. He also featured for the London XI that took part in the Inter-Cities Fairs Cup.

He finally left Charlton in 1961 and continued in non-league football for another two years with Guildford City before retiring. Kiernan had worked as an accountant during his playing days and continued in this role after leaving football, as well as becoming an antiques dealer in Tunbridge Wells. He died in April 2006.
