= Ian Johnstone (footballer) =

Scottish footballer

Personal information
- Full name: Ian Donaldson Johnstone
- Date of birth: 2 March 1939
- Place of birth: Galashiels, Scotland
- Date of death: 1993 (aged 53–54)
- Position: Forward

Senior career*
Years	Team	Apps	(Gls)
- Ormiston Primrose
1958–1960	Colchester United	2	(0)
- Clacton Town
Total		2	(0)
- * Club domestic league appearances and goals

Ian Donaldson Johnstone (2 March 1939 – 1993) was a Scottish footballer who played in the Football League as a forward for Colchester United.

== Career ==
Born in Galashiels, Johnstone joined Scottish amateur club Ormiston Primrose as a youth, earning a move to Colchester United in the 1958–59 season. He played two games in the Football League for the U's, making his debut in a 1–0 home victory against Chesterfield on 18 April 1959 and made his final appearance on 29 August 1959 in a 2–2 draw with Barnsley at Layer Road. He later played for Clacton Town. Ian Johnstone died in 1993.
