= Geoff Truett =

English footballer

Personal information
- Full name: Geoffrey Frederick Truett
- Date of birth: 23 May 1935
- Place of birth: Forest Gate, County Borough of West Ham, England
- Date of death: 5 January 2015 (aged 79)
- Place of death: Copthorne, England
- Position: Winger

Senior career*
Years	Team	Apps	(Gls)
1952–1957	Wycombe Wanderers	73	(42)
1957–1962	Crystal Palace	38	(5)
1962–1970	Tonbridge		
1970–1973	Hastings United		
- * Club domestic league appearances and goals

Geoffrey Frederick Truett (23 May 1935 – 5 January 2015) was an English professional footballer, who played as a winger.

== Early and personal life ==
Geoffrey Frederick Truett was born on 23 May 1935, in Forest Gate, Essex. He was evacuated to Amersham, Buckinghamshire during World War II, and as a youth he was involved in athletics, competing in shot put and javelin.

Truett was married with two children and five grandchildren.

== Career ==
Truett began playing for Wycombe Wanderers alongside brother Jim, scoring 63 goals in 114 appearances in all competitions between 1952 and 1957. While playing with Wycombe, Truett won the Isthmian League in 1956 and 1957, and was a runner-up in the 1957 FA Amateur Cup. Following interest from a number of professional clubs, Truett was a member of the London XI team which played in Switzerland in 1957. Truett then played in the Football League for Crystal Palace, scoring 5 goals in 38 league appearances between 1957 and 1962. He later played for Tonbridge between 1962 and 1970, where he remains the player with the record number of starts, with 517 in all competitions, the only player to have more appearances was Mark Gillham. While playing with Tonbridge, Truett won the 1965 Kent Senior Cup, and he was twice voted as the club's Player of the Year. Truett finished his career with Hastings United, retiring in 1973 at the age of 38. Truett combined his semi-professional playing career with working as a builder.

== Later life and death ==
After retiring as a player Truett worked as a buyer for a number of building firms in the Croydon area. He died on 5 January 2015, aged 79, following a short illness. At the time of his death he was living in Copthorne, West Sussex with his daughter, after his wife had moved into a nursing home.
