= Brian Dobson =

Brian Dobson may refer to:

- Brian Dobson (archaeologist) (1931–2012), English archaeologist
- Brian Dobson (footballer) (1934–2025), English footballer
- Bryan Dobson (born 1960), Irish journalist
- Brian Dobson (actor), English–Canadian voice actor
