= Ron Reynolds (footballer, born 1928) =

English footballer

- Reynolds (foreground) playing for London Combination in 1960

Personal information
- Full name: Ronald Sidney Maurice Reynolds
- Date of birth: 2 June 1928
- Place of birth: Haslemere, England
- Date of death: 2 June 1999 (aged 71)
- Place of death: Haslemere, England
- Height: 6 ft 0 in (1.83 m)
- Position: Goalkeeper

Senior career*
Years	Team	Apps	(Gls)
1945–1950	Aldershot	114	(0)
1950–1960	Tottenham Hotspur	86	(0)
1960–1963	Southampton	90	(0)
Total		290	(0)
- * Club domestic league appearances and goals

Ronald Sidney Maurice Reynolds (2 June 1928 – 2 June 1999) was an English goalkeeper whose career spanned nearly 20 years; he played 290 League games for three professional clubs, and for most of the 1950s played for Tottenham Hotspur, alongside his friend and tactical confidant, Danny Blanchflower.

== Playing career ==
=== Aldershot ===
Reynolds was born in Haslemere and started his career at Aldershot as a 17–year old in 1945.

While a 22-year-old goalkeeper with Aldershot, Reynolds wrote to Southampton asking for a trial but unfortunately Saints declined this offer and he instead went to White Hart Lane initially as the understudy to Ted Ditchburn.

=== Tottenham Hotspur ===
During his spell at Tottenham, Portsmouth had tried to sign him, but Reynolds was considered too valuable to be released and it wasn't until ten years after he had first contacted Southampton that Ted Bates, beating the transfer deadline by 24 hours, bought him from Spurs for £10,000. Reynolds played 138 first team games for Tottenham Hotspur including 86 League matches, 9 F.A. Cup the rest being Friendly, Tour and Representative games.

=== Southampton ===
Reynolds' composure and experience became a vital ingredient as Southampton went on to lift the Division 3 championship at the end of the 1959–1960 season.

Reynolds was in goal in a memorable match on 5 December 1960, in the League Cup round 4 at home to Leeds United – he went off after 19 minutes, injured when diving bravely at the feet of the Leeds centre-forward, John McCole. He was replaced in goal by Cliff Huxford who conceded four goals; fortunately for Southampton, Derek Reeves scored all five goals for the home side, who ran out 5–4 victors.

He broke his ankle in the first match of the 1961–62 season, at home to Plymouth Argyle on 19 August. He was replaced in goal, firstly by Terry Paine who let in 2 goals and was in turn replaced by Huxford. Reynolds took no further part in that season but fought his way back into the first team and was re-established as first choice keeper at the start of the next season.

Unfortunately, his career was terminated by a dislocated shoulder sustained at Fratton Park on 28 September 1963 – again Huxford took over in goal as substitutes were still not available.

Reynolds was one of the first professional footballers to have worn contact lenses.

== Retirement ==
After his injury, Reynolds scouted briefly for Saints and Crystal Palace, before joining a firm of insurance brokers in 1964. He later set up his own brokers business in Haslemere.

== Memorabilia ==
Reynolds died on his 71st birthday (2 June 1999), and upon clearing out his house his family discovered a meticulously kept archive of Reynolds' professional career - cupboards, shoeboxes and carrier bags full of notebooks, programmes, ticket stubs, press cuttings, photographs, souvenirs from foreign tours and Reynolds' own match reports of all his games.

His collection of memorabilia provides an insight into the experiences of professional footballers during the 1950s. This was the era of the maximum wage, when players faced restrictions on their ability to move between clubs. The system was criticised by players' representatives, including Jimmy Hill., who described the restrictions as "soccer slavery."

Reynolds was known for being fastidious and outspoken. He was an active representative for the PFA (Professional Footballers' Association) and was reportedly involved in many of the disputes associated with his more famous teammate, Danny Blanchflower, with whom he shared a passion for the glory of the game. His strength of character made him a natural champion of players' rights, but this sense of purpose was also ideal in his career as a goalkeeper.

In 2003, his son, David, published a collection of his late father's memoirs.

In the book he reports an incident of "tapping-up" – whilst at Southampton, he was astonished to be contacted by the great Alf Ramsey over a possible transfer to Ipswich Town.
