= John Hoskins (footballer) =

English footballer (1931-2006)

Personal information
- Full name: John Frederick Hoskins
- Date of birth: 10 May 1931
- Place of birth: Southampton, England
- Date of death: 2006 (aged 74–75)
- Height: 5 ft 10 in (1.78 m)
- Position: Outside left

Youth career
- Millbrook Rangers

Senior career*
Years	Team	Apps	(Gls)
- Winchester City
1952–1959	Southampton	220	(64)
1959–1960	Swindon Town	10	(3)
- Cambridge United
- * Club domestic league appearances and goals

John Frederick Hoskins (10 May 1931 – 2006) was an English footballer who played at outside-left in the 1950s, making over 230 appearances for Southampton followed by a brief spell at Swindon Town.

== Football career ==
Hoskins was born in Southampton, the great-nephew of Bert Hoskins, who had played for the club in the 1900s before joining Wolverhampton Wanderers.

Having played youth football with Millbrook Rangers, he joined Winchester City where he gained a reputation as a prolific goalscorer. This brought him to the attention of his hometown club for whom he signed as a professional in July 1952.

Hoskins made his debut in a 3–0 defeat at Blackburn Rovers on 6 December, with his first goal coming in the next match, a 2–2 draw at home to Nottingham Forest. He soon became a regular on the left wing, making 20 Second Division appearances in his debut season, scoring five goals. Southampton struggled all season and finished as second from last, to be relegated to the Third Division South.

The following season, Hoskins played the first ten matches in which he scored six goals, helping the "Saints" reach the top of the table. On 19 September 1953, Southampton were away to Walsall for the first-ever league match between the two teams. The match ended in a 1–0 defeat and the team were criticised by the club chairman: "for a team to stroll onto the field and meander about in a Saintly manner of 'all's well with the world' is plumb inexcusable". Hoskins lost his place to Derek Digby before returning six matches later. Hoskins was in and out of the side until mid-February before playing on the left in the final 17 matches, scoring another six goals. Having been second in the division at the end of January, the Saints managed only four further victories to slide down to finish sixth in the table.

In 1954–55, was a regular for the whole season missing only two matches scoring 13 goals from his 44 league appearances, as Southampton finished third in the table, 11 points behind the champions. Described as playing "languid" football, he was selected for the Football Association tour of the West Indies, in which he scored six goals in 11 games.

Hoskins seemed to be "on the threshold of major success", when his career was interrupted by two cartilage operations. In the 1955–56 season, Hoskins scored seven goals from his 32 appearances as Southampton finished in their lowest-ever league position, 14th in the Third Division South. For Hoskins, the following season was even more unsatisfactory as his injuries restricted him to 16 appearances, with youngster Terry Paine regularly standing in for him.

In 1957–58, Hoskins regained his fitness and his place on the left, with Paine becoming a fixture on the right wing. Hoskins made 37 appearances, scoring 18 goals (his best tally for a season); despite scoring 112 goals (with Derek Reeves and Don Roper contributing 31 and 18 respectively), the defence conceded 72 goals, and as a consequence, the Saints finished in sixth place, six points behind the champions. Hoskins gained further representative honours when he was selected to play for the Third Division South against their northern equivalents.

Hoskins's final season at The Dell came in 1958–59, by the end of which he had lost his place on the left to John Sydenham, with Hoskins often moving to inside-left to accommodate the youngster.

In July 1959, Hoskins was transferred to Swindon Town; although he made eleven appearances at the start of the season, in which he scored three goals, he lost his place to Arnold D'Arcy. Shortly afterwards, Hoskins left Swindon and briefly joined non-league Cambridge United before returning to Southampton, where he became a bus driver.

== Bibliography ==
- Holley, Duncan; Chalk, Gary (1992). The Alphabet of the Saints. ACL & Polar Publishing. ISBN 0-9514862-3-3.
- Holley, Duncan; Chalk, Gary (2003). In That Number – A post-war chronicle of Southampton FC. Hagiology Publishing. ISBN 0-9534474-3-X.
- Hugman, Barry (1981). Football League Players Records (1946–1981). Aylesbury: Rothmans Publications. ISBN 0-907574-08-4.
