= Stan Charlton Sr. =

English footballer

Stanley Charlton
Personal information
- Date of birth: 16 November 1900
- Place of birth: Little Hulton, England
- Date of death: 1971 (aged 70–71)
- Position: Defender

Senior career*
Years	Team	Apps	(Gls)
1919	Little Hulton United		
1920-1921	Oldham Athletic	6	(0)
1922-1923	Rochdale	38	(0)
1923–1928	Exeter City	163	(10)
1928–1932	Crystal Palace	122	(7)
1932–1933	Newport County	32	(0)
1933	Margate		
1934	Streatham Town		
1935	Greenbroom Athletic		
1936	Venner Sports		
- * Club domestic league appearances and goals

Stanley Charlton (16 November 1900 – 1971) was an English professional footballer who played as a full back in the Football League for Exeter City, Crystal Palace and Newport County. He was the father of Stan Charlton who also had a career as a professional footballer.

== Playing career ==
Charlton was born on 16 November 1900, in Little Hulton, then within Lancashire, but subsequently part of Greater Manchester.

In May 1928, Charlton was signed for Crystal Palace by Fred Mavin, previously his manager at Exeter City, who immediately made him captain. Palace finished runners-up in Division Three South in 1928–29 missing out on the single promotion place on goal difference. Charlton missed only one game and scored four times. in the following three seasons Charlton made 25 appearances (two goals), 33 appearances (without scoring) and 22 appearances (one goal) respectively. On 8 October 1932, Charlton moved on to Newport County.

Whilst with Exeter City, Charlton toured Australia, in 1925 with an official Football Association XI.

== Later career ==
Stan Charlton died in 1971 aged 70 or 71.
