= Ken Nicholas =

English sportsman (football & rugby union)

- Ken Nicholas at Vale Park 1960/1961

Personal information
- Full name: Kenneth William Nicholas
- Date of birth: 3 February 1938
- Place of birth: Northampton, England
- Date of death: 24 March 2007 (aged 69)
- Position: Full back

Youth career
- 1955: Arsenal

Senior career*
Years	Team	Apps	(Gls)
1955–1959	Arsenal	0	(0)
1959–1965	Watford	198	(4)
1965–1966	Guildford City		
1966–1968	Hastings United		
- Tonbridge
- * Club domestic league appearances and goals

Kenneth William Nicholas (3 February 1938 – 24 March 2007) was an English sportsman, best known for his football career. After playing both football and rugby for his country at schoolboy level, Nicholas became a professional footballer. He, playing in England as a full back, then featured for Arsenal, Watford, Guildford City, Hastings United and Tonbridge as well as teams in Portugal.

== Career ==
Born in Northampton, Nicholas represented England's schoolboy and youth football teams, as well as its rugby schoolboys team. He joined Football League First Division side Arsenal in 1955, but was unable to break into the team, and joined Fourth Division Watford on a free transfer in 1959. By contrast to his time at Arsenal, Nicholas under the management of Ron Burgess, immediately became a first-choice starter in Watford's team. In 1959–60, his first season at Watford, Nicholas helped Watford gain promotion to the Third Division for the first time in their history. Nicholas continued to play regularly for the Hornets over the following five seasons.

Ken Furphy, a full back himself, became Watford's player-manager in November 1964, and the 1964–65 season proved to be Nicholas's last at Vicarage Road. Altogether in his Watford career he made 219 appearances in all competitions.

In the summer of 1965 he joined Southern League side Guildford City. The following year he moved to Hastings United, and after a spell at Tonbridge, Nicholas moved to the Algarve in Portugal, where he finished his career.

== Personal life ==
Nicholas died in Blackheath on 24 March 2007 after a long illness.
