= Billy Hunt (footballer) =

English footballer

Personal information
- Full name: William Edmund Hunt
- Date of birth: 25 November 1934 (age 91)
- Place of birth: Colchester, England
- Position: Centre half

Youth career
- Colchester United

Senior career*
Years	Team	Apps	(Gls)
1955–1956	Colchester United	1	(0)
- Sudbury Town
- * Club domestic league appearances and goals

William Edmund Hunt (born 25 November 1934) is an English former professional footballer who played as a centre half for Colchester United.

== Biography ==
Born in Colchester in Essex, Hunt signed for Colchester in 1955, having been an apprentice at the club. He made his début against Southend United on 27 August 1955. However, this was his only appearance for Colchester, before leaving to join Sudbury Town the following year.
