= Frank Kletzenbauer =

English footballer

Personal information
- Full name: Carl Frank Kletzenbauer
- Date of birth: 21 July 1936
- Place of birth: Coventry, England
- Date of death: 8 August 1996 (aged 60)
- Place of death: Nuneaton, England
- Position: Full back

Youth career
- Municipal Sports

Senior career*
Years	Team	Apps	(Gls)
1956–1964	Coventry City	122	(3)
1964–196?	Walsall	12	(0)
- * Club domestic league appearances and goals

Carl Frank Kletzenbauer (21 July 1936 – 8 August 1996) was an English footballer who made 134 appearances in the Football League playing for Coventry City and Walsall. He was a member of the Coventry team that beat West Ham United in the final to win the last edition of the Southern Professional Floodlit Cup in 1960, and played nine matches in the 1963–64 season as Coventry went on to win the Football League Third Division title. He was sold to Walsall before the end of that season.
