= Arthur Adey =

Scottish footballer

Personal information
- Full name: Arthur Lewis Adey
- Date of birth: 1 March 1930
- Place of birth: Glasgow, Scotland
- Date of death: January 1994 (aged 63)
- Place of death: Surrey, England
- Position: Forward

Senior career*
| Years | Team | Apps | (Gls) |
| 1949–1950 | Bishop Auckland | | |
| 1950–1954 | Doncaster Rovers | 48 | (10) |
| 1954–1955 | Gillingham | 7 | (1) |
| 1954–1955 | Bradford Park Avenue | 13 | (4) |
| 1955–1956 | Bedford Town | 29 | (15) |
| 1956–1957 | Guildford City | 6 | (3) |
| 1957–1959 | Chelmsford City | | |
- Valley Sports
- Kidderminster Harriers
- Weymouth

Managerial career
- Cobham
- * Club domestic league appearances and goals

Arthur Lewis Adey (1 March 1930 – January 1994) was a Scottish professional association football player of the 1950s. Born in Glasgow, he was a centre forward and began his professional career with Doncaster Rovers and later played for Gillingham and Bradford Park Avenue. He made 68 appearances in The Football League and scored 15 goals.

== Playing career ==
He signed for Doncaster Rovers in September 1950, following his move from Bishop Auckland and made his professional debut in Division Two on 14 April 1951 against Queens Park Rangers. In 1954, after three more seasons with the club, he moved to Gillingham, where he only made seven appearances, scoring one goal. He next moved to Bradford Park Avenue, where he scored four times in thirteen appearances before drifting out of professional football.

He later went on to play for Bedford Town, Worcester City, Guildford City and Chelmsford City. Following his departure from Chelmsford in May 1959, Adey played for Valley Sports, Kidderminster Harriers and Weymouth. After his retirement, Adey managed Cobham in the Surrey Senior League.
