= Peter Harburn =

English footballer and manager (1931-2010)

Personal information
- Full name: Peter Arthur Patrick Harburn
- Date of birth: 18 June 1931
- Place of birth: Shoreditch, England
- Date of death: 13 March 2010 (aged 78)
- Place of death: Chelmsford, England
- Height: 6 ft 1 in (1.85 m)
- Position: Centre forward

Youth career
- Brentford

Senior career*
Years	Team	Apps	(Gls)
–	Portsmouth	0	(0)
1954–1958	Brighton & Hove Albion	126	(61)
1958–1959	Everton	4	(1)
1959	Scunthorpe United	20	(8)
1959–1961	Workington	67	(23)
1961–196?	Chelmsford City		
–	Stevenage Town		
–	Wisbech Town		

Managerial career
- 1966: Chelmsford City
- * Club domestic league appearances and goals

Peter Arthur Patrick Harburn (18 June 1931 – 13 March 2010) was a professional footballer who scored 93 goals from 217 appearances in the Football League playing for Brighton & Hove Albion, Everton, Scunthorpe United and Workington. He played as a centre forward. He then played non-League football for Chelmsford City, where he also acted as trainer and manager, Stevenage Town and Wisbech Town.

== Life and career ==
Harburn was born in Shoreditch, London. As a youngster, he was on Brentford's books before he joined the Royal Navy in 1946. While serving in the Navy, he played for Portsmouth as an amateur, but never played for that club in the League. Described as "a gauche amateur with Portsmouth, who had the happy habit of scoring via almost any part of his anatomy that the laws allowed", he moved on to Brighton & Hove Albion, and turned professional with that club in February 1956 having bought himself out of the service. A few days later he was mistakenly named in the Great Britain squad preparing for the Olympic Games, for which, as a professional, he was ineligible.

In his first full season with Brighton, he scored 27 goals, including a sequence of 8 goals in 8 consecutive matches, a club record not beaten until 2001. The following season, 1957–58, Brighton finished as Third Division South champions. Harburn recalled the team were expected to take an attacking approach: "We scored 114 goals in our promotion year and I remember the manager Billy Lane telling us that when you see the whites of the goalposts whack it." He and Dave Sexton were joint top scorers with 20 goals in all competitions.

Harburn asked the club for an extra £1 a week, but was refused, and in July 1958, he was sold to Everton for a fee of £6,500. The player himself thought he "wasn't ready for that quality of football", and he made only four appearances at the top level, scoring once. After five months of the season, he moved on to Scunthorpe United in January 1959 for a fee of just £4,000. He scored in each of his first two games for Scunthorpe, and finished the season with 8 goals from 15 games, a return that "proved instrumental in the fight to avoid the drop" from the club's first season in the Football League Second Division. He played in the first five games of the following season, without scoring, but was deemed surplus to requirements after Harry Middleton's arrival from Wolverhampton Wanderers. He finished his Football League career with two seasons in the Fourth Division with Workington.

He went on to Southern League club Chelmsford City, where he scored 12 goals from 37 appearances. He acted as trainer under Billy Frith's management, then as caretaker manager after Frith left the club, and was appointed manager in his own right in February 1966. After 50 games in charge, with 24 wins and 15 draws, Chelmsford sacked him, but he won a £601 compensation payment for wrongful dismissal. He went on to play non-League football for Stevenage Town and Wisbech Town before returning to Chelmsford to work in the licensed trade. He died on 13 March 2010, aged 78.
