= Dennis Evans (footballer, born 1930) =

English footballer

Personal information
- Full name: Dennis Joseph Evans
- Date of birth: 18 May 1930
- Place of birth: Old Swan, Liverpool, England
- Date of death: 23 February 2000 (aged 69)
- Position: Full-back

Youth career
- Ellesmere Port Town

Senior career*
Years	Team	Apps	(Gls)
1951–1963	Arsenal	189	(10)
- * Club domestic league appearances and goals

Dennis Joseph Evans (18 May 1930 – 23 February 2000) was an English footballer who played as a full-back.

== Career ==
Born in Old Swan, Liverpool, Evans first played junior football for Wirral club Ellesmere Port Town. He had an unsuccessful trial with Wolves, before signing for London side Arsenal and moving to Harringay in January 1951. After two years in the reserve and youth sides, he made his first-team debut for Arsenal against Huddersfield Town on 22 August 1953. Although, only a bit-part player that season, the next season he became Arsenal's regular left back, succeeding Walley Barnes.

Evans was an Arsenal regular for the rest of the decade, and he was an ever-present in 1955–56. During this time, he scored one of the most memorable own goals in football history; towards the end of a match against Blackpool on 17 December 1955, which Arsenal were winning 4–0, Evans heard a whistle from the crowd, and mistakenly thought the referee had blown for full-time. He kicked the ball in triumph, which ended up flying past Arsenal goalkeeper Con Sullivan and into his own net; the goal stood but Arsenal held on to win 4–1.

With a calm composure, physical strength and a powerful left foot, Evans was rarely out of the Arsenal side during this time, and became Arsenal's preferred penalty taker in 1956; he scored twelve goals for the club in his 207 appearances, including seven in 1958–59. He deputised for goalkeeper Jack Kelsey after the Welshman was injured in an FA Cup match in 1959. For a short spell he was also Arsenal captain, and he played for the London XI in the 1955–58 Inter-Cities Fairs Cup semi-finals. However, the Gunners were going through a lean spell and were unable to challenge for honours, meaning Evans never won a medal.

Evans was Arsenal's first choice left back right up until a match against Wolves on 29 August 1959, in which he broke his ankle. After recovering, he was not quite the same player he was. With Billy McCullough coming through to replace him, he made only six more appearances for the first team that season (his last coming against Tottenham Hotspur on 16 January 1960), before stepping down to the Arsenal reserve side. He remained an Arsenal player until 1963, helping to coach to the youth and reserve teams, and later had a spell at Luton Town doing the same.

== After football ==
After his time at Luton Evans left football entirely, later working as chauffeur. He died in 2000, aged 69.
