= Arnold D'Arcy =

English footballer (1932–2025)

Personal information
- Full name: Arnold Joseph D'Arcy
- Date of birth: 13 January 1933
- Place of birth: Blackburn, England
- Date of death: 6 October 2025 (aged 92)
- Position: Left wing

Senior career*
Years	Team	Apps	(Gls)
1951–1953	Accrington Stanley	38	(9)
1953–1956	Wigan Athletic	12	(3)
1956–1964	Swindon Town	223	(29)
1964–1965	Cheltenham Town		
Total		261	(38)
- * Club domestic league appearances and goals

Arnold Joseph D'Arcy (13 January 1933 – 3 October 2025) was an English professional footballer who played as a left winger in the Football League. He died in October 2025, at the age of 92.

D'Arcy died on 3 October 2025, at the age of 92.

== Sources ==
- "Arnold Darcy". Post War English & Scottish Football League A–Z Player's Transfer Database. Neil Brown.
- Hugman, Barry (2005). The PFA Premier and Football League Players' Records 1946-2005. Queen Anne Press.
- Hayes, Dean (1996). The Latics: The Official History of Wigan Athletic F.C. Harefield: Yore Publications. ISBN 1-874427-91-7.
