= Stan Charlton =

English footballer & manager

Personal information
- Full name: Stanley Charlton
- Date of birth: 28 June 1929
- Place of birth: Exeter, England
- Date of death: 20 December 2012 (aged 83)
- Place of death: Dorchester, England
- Position: Right back

Senior career*
Years	Team	Apps	(Gls)
–1952	Bromley		
1952–1955	Leyton Orient	151	(1)
1955–1958	Arsenal	99	(0)
1958–1965	Leyton Orient	216	(1)
Total		466	(2)

International career
–1952	England amateur	4	(0)

Managerial career
- 1965–1972: Weymouth
- * Club domestic league appearances and goals

Stanley Charlton (28 June 1929 – 20 December 2012) was an English footballer and manager. Charlton featured as a right back with clubs Bromley, Leyton Orient and Arsenal. As a manager he was one of the longest serving at Weymouth.

== Career ==
=== Bromley and Leyton Orient ===
He started his playing career as an amateur with Bromley, where he won four caps for the English amateur team. Charlton was also a member of Great Britain's squad for the 1952 Olympics, although he did not play within the footballing tournament. He signed as a professional for Leyton Orient in 1952, and was a near ever-present for the next three seasons for Orient, as they finished runners-up in the Third Division in 1954–55. He was selected to play for the Third Division South team against the North in 1955–56.

=== Arsenal ===
In November 1955 Charlton joined Arsenal with Orient teammate Vic Groves for £30,000, and succeeded Len Wills as the club's first-choice right back. He made his debut on 24 December 1955 against Chelsea and remained in the same position for mostly the rest of the season. Charlton was also an ever-present figure for the club in the 1956–57 and 1957–58 seasons, and played for the London XI in both legs of the semi-finals of the 1955–58 Inter-Cities Fairs Cup against Lausanne Sports.

=== Return to Orient ===
However, he was dropped by Arsenal after a 3–1 defeat to Burnley in September 1958, in favour of Wills, the man he had originally displaced. Having made only four appearances in the first half of 1958–59 for Arsenal, he moved back to Orient in December 1958; he made 110 appearances for Arsenal, scoring three goals all of which were netted in the FA Cup. At Orient, he remained at the side for the next seven seasons, skippering them to promotion to the First Division in 1962 and for their one and only season in the top flight, 1962–63.

=== Retirement and later life ===
Charlton retired in summer 1965, having played 366 league matches for Leyton Orient over the two spells. He became manager of Weymouth and remained in that post for seven years. After that, he became a district manager for a major football pools company.

Charlton maintained his connection with Leyton Orient, attending several end of season award ceremonies at Leyton Orient Supporters' Club. He also attended other popular LOSC functions, such as the regular reunions of fellow O's players that played in the Leyton Orient side that won promotion to the First Division. He also took part in a presentation involving the Leyton Orient's Supporters' Trust.

Charlton died in the early hours of 20 December 2012, aged 83, at Dorchester Hospital.

== Personal life ==
Charlton's father, also Stanley Charlton, played as a full back for Exeter City and Crystal Palace during the 1920s and 1930s.
