= Cyril Hammond =

English footballer

Personal information
- Full name: Cyril Samuel Hammond
- Date of birth: 10 October 1927
- Place of birth: Woolwich, London, England
- Date of death: 10 September 2016 (aged 88)
- Place of death: Princes Risborough, England
- Position: Left half

Senior career*
Years	Team	Apps	(Gls)
1949–1950	Erith & Belvedere		
1950–1958	Charlton Athletic	201	(2)
1958–1961	Colchester United	95	(5)
Total		296	(7)
- * Club domestic league appearances and goals

Cyril Samuel Hammond (10 October 1927 – 10 September 2016) was an English footballer who made nearly 300 appearances in the Football League playing as a left half for Charlton Athletic and Colchester United.

He was a member of the London XI that competed in the inaugural edition of the Fairs Cup; he appeared just once, in the group stage of the competition.
