= Alfred Noble (footballer) =

English footballer (1924–1999)

Personal information
- Full name: Alfred William Thomas Noble
- Date of birth: 18 September 1924
- Place of birth: Hackney, England
- Date of death: 24 November 1999 (aged 75)
- Place of death: Norwich, England
- Position: Forward

Senior career*
Years	Team	Apps	(Gls)
- Briggs Sports
1955	Colchester United	1	(0)
- Leytonstone

International career
1952	Great Britain	1	(0)
- * Club domestic league appearances and goals

Alfred William Thomas Noble (18 September 1924 – 24 November 1999) was an English footballer who represented Great Britain at the 1952 Summer Olympics. He made one appearance in the Football League for Colchester United, in December 1955.
