= John Wright (footballer, born 1933) =

English footballer (1933–2023)

Personal information
- Full name: John Francis Dominic Wright
- Date of birth: 13 August 1933
- Place of birth: Aldershot, England
- Date of death: 23 November 2023 (aged 90)
- Height: 5 ft 11 in (1.80 m)
- Position: Goalkeeper

Senior career*
Years	Team	Apps	(Gls)
1952–1961	Colchester United	5	(0)
- Great Bentley
- Clacton Town
Total		5	(0)
- * Club domestic league appearances and goals

John Francis Dominic Wright (13 August 1933 – 23 November 2023) was an English footballer who played as a goalkeeper in the Football League for Colchester United. He died on 23 November 2023, at the age of 90.

== Career ==
Born in Aldershot, Wright joined Colchester United from local amateur forms in May 1952, becoming a part-time professional whilst on National Service. He was a serviceman when he made his first-team debut for the club during the 1954–55 season, a 5–3 defeat to Southampton at Layer Road on 30 April 1955.

Four of Wright's five first-team appearances for Colchester came during his conscription, largely down to the consistency of Percy Ames as he clocked up four consecutive seasons without missing a game for the club. Wright waited patiently for his next chance, which was to be his final professional game, bringing an end to Ames' string of 236 consecutive appearances. In the game, Wright saved a penalty from Bill Myerscough but the club still lost 2–0 to Coventry City on 14 January 1961.

Wright decided to leave Colchester at the end of the 1960–61 season, with nine years of service and just five appearances to his name. He joined the police force and played locally for Great Bentley, but eventually left the force in summer 1963, going to work for the electricity board and joining Clacton Town where he lived.
