= Alf Marshall (footballer, born 1933) =

English footballer (1933–2021)

Personal information
- Full name: Alfred George Marshall
- Date of birth: 21 May 1933
- Place of birth: Dagenham, England
- Date of death: October 2021 (aged 88)
- Place of death: Essex, England
- Position: Full-back

Senior career*
Years	Team	Apps	(Gls)
- Dagenham
1958–1961	Colchester United	30	(0)
- Clacton Town
Total		30	(0)
- * Club domestic league appearances and goals

Alfred George Marshall (21 May 1933 – October 2021) was an English footballer who played in the Football League as a full-back for Colchester United. He died in Essex in October 2021, at the age of 88.

== Career ==
Born in Dagenham, Marshall signed for Football League club Colchester United from his hometown club of Dagenham in 1958 for the sum of £25. He made his debut for Colchester on 8 October 1958 in a 0–0 draw with Reading at Elm Park. Marshall made 30 league appearances for the club between 1958 and 1961, making his final appearance on 29 April 1961 in a 4–3 win at home to Chesterfield.

On leaving Colchester, Marshall returned to non-league football with Clacton Town.
