= Con Sullivan (footballer) =

English footballer (1928–2022)

Personal information
- Full name: Cornelius Sullivan
- Date of birth: 22 September 1928
- Place of birth: Bristol, England
- Date of death: 14 April 2022 (aged 93)
- Position: Goalkeeper

Senior career*
Years	Team	Apps	(Gls)
1950–1953	Bristol City	73	(0)
1953–1958	Arsenal	28	(0)
Total		101	(0)
- * Club domestic league appearances and goals

Cornelius Sullivan (22 August 1928 – 14 April 2022) was an English footballer who played in the Football League for Arsenal and Bristol City.

Sullivan is arguably most notable for his part in a memorable own goal scored by team-mate Dennis Evans in a game against Blackpool in December 1955. With Arsenal winning 4–0, Sullivan and Evans heard what they thought was the final whistle, and while Sullivan turned to retrieve his cap, Evans kicked the ball past him into his own net. The whistle had in fact come from the crowd, and Evans' own goal counted; the match finished 4–1.

Sullivan died in April 2022, at the age of 93.
