= Peter Carey (English footballer) =

English footballer

Personal information
- Full name: Peter Richard Carey
- Date of birth: 14 April 1933 (age 93)
- Place of birth: Barking, England
- Position: Left back

Senior career*
Years	Team	Apps	(Gls)
1955–1956	Barking		
1956–1960	Leyton Orient	34	(2)
1960	Queens Park Rangers	15	(1)
1960–1961	Colchester United	10	(0)
1961–1963	Aldershot	47	(0)
1963–1965	Dover		
1965–1966	Ashford Town		
1966–1968	Brentwood Town		
1968–1970	Gravesend & Northfleet		
Total		106	(3)

Managerial career
- 1970–: Walthamstow Avenue
- –1978: Leyton-Wingate
- 1978–1979: Tilbury
- 1982–1983: Barking
- * Club domestic league appearances and goals

Peter Richard Carey (born 14 April 1933) is an English former professional football player and coach who played as a Left back in the Football League for Leyton Orient, Queens Park Rangers, Colchester United and Aldershot making a total of 106 appearances scoring 3 goals. After his playing career Carey was a manager of several non-league teams

== Playing career ==
Carey was an amateur player with Barking in the Isthmian League before he began playing with Leyton Orient of Football League Second Division in 1956, appearing in two first team games in the 1956–57 season. In October 1956 he played in an Essex FA representative team. He signed as a professional player with "Orient" during October 1957 and made 24 appearances in the 1957–58 season. During the next two seasons, Carey played only eight matches for the club and in July 1960 was signed to Football League Third Division club Queens Park Rangers by Alec Stock – the same manager who had signed him as a professional for "The Os" 3 years previously.

Despite playing in 15 of QPR's first 20 league matches of the 1960–61 season Carey was not an automatic first team starter and on 25 November 1960 signed with Colchester United. At the end of the season Colchester, who were relegated from the Third Division, did not retain Carey and he subsequently signed with Aldershot of the Fourth Division. He played with "The Shots" for two seasons, after which they made him available for a free transfer.

Carey then began playing non-league football, firstly for two seasons with Dover, followed by a single season with Ashford Town, both clubs being in Division One of the Southern League. His next club was Brentwood Town who, when he initially played for them during the 1966–67 season, were members of the Metropolitan League (and won the Metropolitan League Challenge Cup); they then joined Division One of the Southern League for the second season he was with the club. Brentwood did not offer Carey a new contract at the end of the 1967–68 season however he signed for Gravesend & Northfleet and continued playing for a two further seasons in the Southern League. In the 1970 close season it was reported that Carey had moved into football managership.

During the early 1970s Carey regularly played in matches for a Spurs XI raising money for good causes.

== Managerial career ==
Carey was reported as joining Walthamstow Avenue of the Isthmian League as manager in September 1970. In November 1978, after being manager at Athenian League club Leyton-Wingate, Carey took on the manager's role with Tilbury, members of the Isthmian League, taking them to the 1979 Essex Senior Cup final where they lost to Harlow Town. He left Tilbury in November 1979 following financial difficulties at the club. Between January 1982 and December 1983 Carey managed Barking in the Premier Division of the Isthmian League.
