= Jim Fotheringham =

Scottish footballer

Personal information
- Full name: James Gibb Fotheringham
- Date of birth: 19 December 1933
- Place of birth: Hamilton, South Lanarkshire, Scotland
- Date of death: 16 September 1977 (aged 43)
- Place of death: Corby, Northamptonshire, England
- Position: Centre back

Youth career
- Arsenal

Senior career*
Years	Team	Apps	(Gls)
1951–1959	Arsenal	72	(0)
1959	Heart of Midlothian	0	(0)
1959–1960	Northampton Town	11	(0)
- * Club domestic league appearances and goals

James Gibb Fotheringham (19 December 1933 – 16 September 1977) was a Scottish footballer, who played as a defender.

Fotheringham was a product of the Arsenal youth system and at 6'4" looked to be an imposing centre back. However, Fotheringham managed only a few runs in the first team and never really convinced before joining Heart of Midlothian for £10,000 in 1959. He returned to England with Northampton Town the same year only to see his career ended early by a bad injury.

Whilst at Arsenal he also featured for the London XI that took part in the Inter-Cities Fairs Cup.
