= 1963–64 Gillingham F.C. season =

English football club season

Gillingham F.C.
1963–64 season
- Chairman: Clifford Grossmark
- Manager: Freddie Cox
- Fourth Division: 1st
- FA Cup: First Round
- League Cup: Fourth Round
- Top goalscorer: League: Brian Gibbs (17); All: Brian Gibbs (18)
- Highest home attendance: 17,421 vs Carlisle United (9 October 1963)
- Lowest home attendance: 5,274 vs Chester (7 March 1964)
Home colours

During the 1963–64 English football season, Gillingham F.C. competed in the Football League Fourth Division, the fourth tier of the English football league system. It was the 32nd season in which Gillingham competed in the Football League, and the 14th since the club was voted back into the league in 1950. Gillingham were undefeated in their first 13 games, the longest such run from the start of the season by any team in the Football League, and by the end of September were top of the league table, where they remained for much of the season, although some fans were unhappy with the team's defensive style of play.

In April, the postponement of several games allowed other teams to overtake Gillingham and push them out of the promotion places, but they moved back up the table as they played the rescheduled games. Going into of the final match of the season, Gillingham were two points behind first-placed Carlisle United, who had already played their last game, meaning that a Gillingham victory would leave the two teams on the same points and the championship would be decided on goal average. Gillingham won their final game and won the Fourth Division championship as their goal average was fractionally better than Carlisle's. It was the club's first Football League divisional championship; Gillingham would not win another until 2013.

Gillingham also competed in two knock-out competitions. The team were eliminated in the first round of the FA Cup but reached the fourth round of the Football League Cup, a feat which the club would not repeat until the 1990s. The team played 52 competitive matches, winning 26, drawing 15 and losing 11. Brian Gibbs was the club's top goalscorer with 17 goals in Fourth Division matches and 18 in all competitions. Mike Burgess and John Simpson made the most appearances; both played in every game of the season. The highest attendance recorded at the club's home ground, Priestfield Stadium, was 17,421 for a game against Carlisle on 9 October 1963.

== Background and pre-season ==
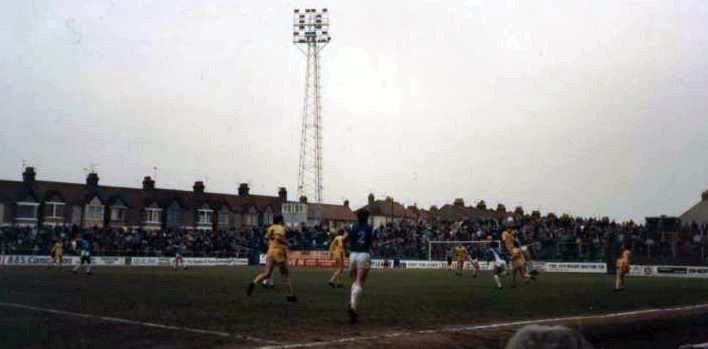
Floodlights were installed for the first time at Priestfield Stadium. (photo c. 1986)

The 1963–64 season was Gillingham's 32nd season playing in the Football League and the 14th since the club was elected back into the League in 1950 after being voted out in 1938. It was the club's sixth consecutive season in the Football League Fourth Division, which had been created in 1958 when the parallel Third Division South and Third Division North were merged and reorganised into two national divisions at the third and fourth tiers of the English football league system.

Freddie Cox was the team's manager, a position he had held since June 1962; in his first season in charge, Gillingham had finished 5th in the Fourth Division, a huge improvement over their 20th-place finish in the 1961–62 season. Prior to the new season, the club signed Geoff Hudson, a 31-year-old full-back with well over a decade of Football League experience, from Crewe Alexandra. Cox also signed three young players from Portsmouth, all of whom he knew from his time managing that club until 1961: Rod Taylor, a half-back aged 19, 21-year-old full-back Jimmy White, and Brian Yeo, a forward also aged 19. Jimmy Boswell assisted Cox in the role of team trainer.

The team wore Gillingham's traditional blue shirts and white shorts, the only change in design from the previous season being the style of collar and the placement of the club badge on the shirt. Redevelopment work took place at the club's home ground, Priestfield Stadium, between seasons as floodlights were installed for the first time, at a cost of £14,000 (equivalent to £260,000 in 2025). The club had been one of the few in the Football League yet to install lights, which had become prevalent in English professional football since the mid-1950s, and when they were switched on for a game for the first time (September 1963) it made Gillingham the 89th out of 92 Football League clubs to play a home match under lights.

== Fourth Division ==
=== August–December ===
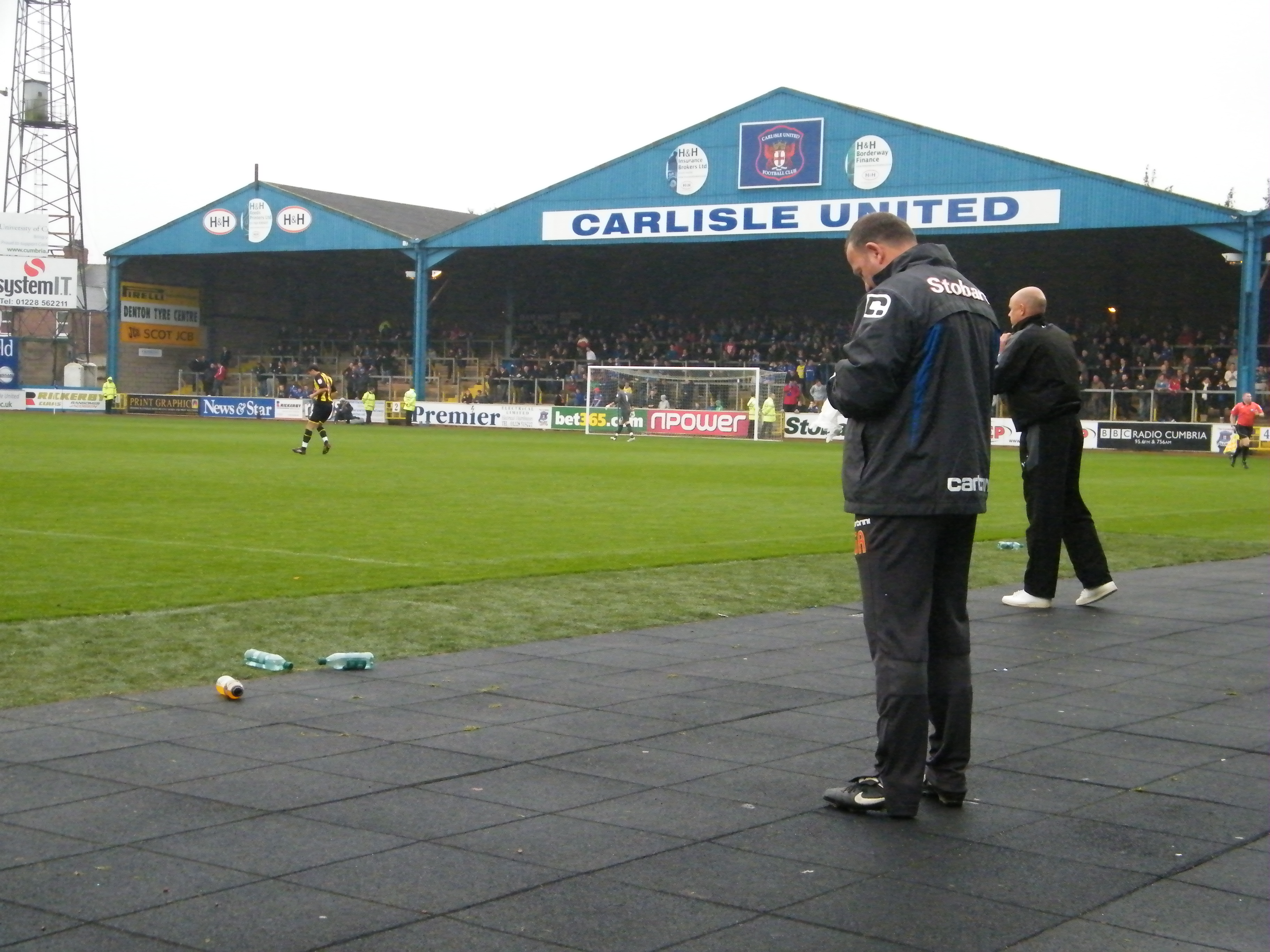
Gillingham's lengthy unbeaten league run came to an end at Brunton Park, home of Carlisle United. (photo 2011)

Gillingham's first two matches of the season were both at home to teams from the city of Bradford. The first took place on 24 August against Bradford (Park Avenue); Gordon Pulley scored Gillingham's first goal of the season and Brian Gibbs added a second to give the team a 2–0 victory. Four days later, the team drew 0–0 with Bradford City; Gillingham were the only team in the Football League to concede no goals in their first two games of the season. The game against Bradford City was the first of three consecutive draws for Gillingham in Fourth Division games as they were also held by Southport and Exeter City. Following a win away to Bradford City and a draw away to Hartlepools United, Gillingham beat Lincoln City 1–0 on 18 September to go top of the league table on goal average. Hudson scored the winner, the only goal he scored in more than 300 Football League matches. At this point Gillingham had conceded only one goal in seven Fourth Division games. The team concluded September with a victory over Darlington and a draw against Tranmere Rovers.

Gillingham began October with four consecutive victories, defeating Lincoln, Halifax Town, Carlisle United, and Doncaster Rovers. George Francis scored five goals in three games at the start of the month. After 13 consecutive Fourth Division games without defeat, Gillingham lost for the first time on 15 October when they were beaten 3–1 by Carlisle; they were the final team in the Football League's four divisions to lose a game during the 1963–64 season. The team won their next two matches without conceding a goal, but then lost two consecutive games without scoring one. Despite the two defeats, Gillingham remained top of the Fourth Division at the end of October, one point ahead of Carlisle. Gibbs was the team's top league goalscorer at this point in the season, his four goals in the month taking his total to eight.

Gillingham won three out of four matches in November and remained top of the division. Gibbs scored five goals in three games, including two in a 3–1 win at home to Workington, the first time the team had scored more than twice in a game at Priestfield during the season so far. On 21 December the team topped this performance by winning 5–1 at home to Southport, their biggest win of the entire season. Ron Newman scored three times, the team's only hat-trick of the season. Gillingham's final two matches of 1963 were both against Chesterfield. On 26 December Pulley scored twice as Gillingham won 3–0 at their opponents' Saltergate stadium, and two days later Gillingham won 1–0 at Priestfield with Gibbs scoring the only goal, his 14th Fourth Division goal of the season. Gillingham finished the year top of the Fourth Division, one point ahead of second-placed Carlisle. They had conceded only 15 goals, the best defensive record in the division; only four other teams in the Fourth Division had conceded fewer than 30.

=== January–May ===
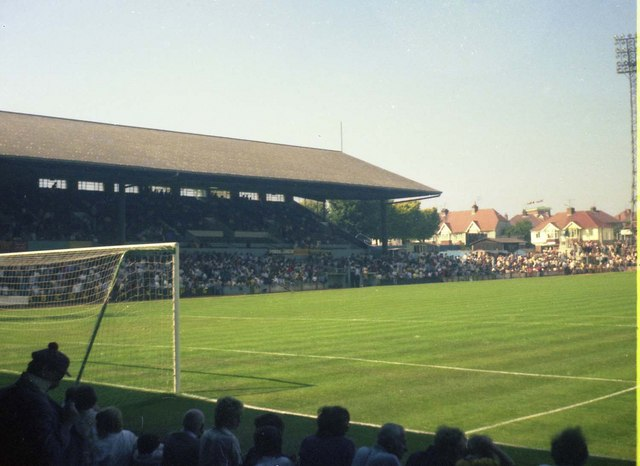
Gillingham's first defeat of 1964 came at the Goldstone Ground, home of Brighton & Hove Albion. (photo 1976)

Gillingham's first two games of 1964 both resulted in goalless draws, at home to Rochdale and away to Exeter, after which they were still top of the table, one point ahead of Carlisle, although Carlisle had played one fewer game. On 18 January Gillingham won 2–0 at home to Hartlepools with two goals from Newman, the team's fifth consecutive game without conceding a goal. After this the team underwent their longest run of the season without a win; they drew the first four games of February and then ended the month by losing 2–1 away to Brighton & Hove Albion, ending a run of ten games without defeat. During the draw against Doncaster Rovers at Priestfield on 22 February, Cox was barracked by fans unhappy at the team's defensive style of play; he responded by throwing a bucket of water over them, and later told the press "They deserved it. Some people here know nothing about football." Despite the winless run, Gillingham remained top of the table at the end of February.

Gillingham beat Chester 2–1 in their first match of March, the team's first win since 18 January. The attendance of 5,274 was the lowest recorded at Priestfield during the season. The team's next two scheduled games were both postponed, allowing Carlisle to overtake them and top the table at the end of March. Gillingham's scheduled match against Oxford United on 4 April was also postponed, and after the matches which did take place on that day the team had slipped to fifth in the table, outside the promotion places. These postponements led to Gillingham being required to play eight games in just over three weeks at the end of the season, beginning with a 3–1 win at home to Barrow on 8 April. The result took the team back up to second place in the table, one point behind Carlisle, but Gillingham then only won one of their next four games to slip to fourth, the lowest position which would result in promotion, although they did have the advantage of having more games still to play than all the other teams in the top half of the table.

On 25 April, Gillingham lost 2–1 away to Rochdale, but Bradford City's defeat to York City later on the same day meant that Gillingham remained in fourth place, ahead of fifth-placed Bradford on goal average. As Bradford had now played their final game of the season, Gillingham were effectively promoted, as they could only drop below Bradford if they lost both their remaining games and conceded at least 17 goals in the process, an implausible scenario. A 1–0 victory two days later away to York guaranteed that Gillingham would be promoted. Gillingham's last match of the season was away to Newport County on 30 April. Before the match, Gillingham were two points behind league leaders Carlisle, who had already played their final game of the season. A win for Gillingham would mean that they would end the season level on points with Carlisle and the championship would go to the team with the better goal average. A goal from Francis gave Gillingham a 1–0 victory and meant that they won the Fourth Division championship as their goal average of 1.967 was superior to Carlisle's 1.948. It was the first Football League divisional championship the club had won as well as the first time the club had won promotion to a higher division in 32 seasons in the League.

=== Match details ===
Key

- In result column, Gillingham's score shown first
- H = Home match
- A = Away match
- pen. = Penalty kick
- o.g. = Own goal

Results

Date	Opponents	Result	Goalscorers	Attendance
24 August 1963	Bradford (Park Avenue) (H)	2–0	Pulley, Gibbs	8,562
28 August 1963	Bradford City (H)	0–0		7,923
31 August 1963	Southport (A)	1–1	Farrall	4,123
7 September 1963	Exeter City (H)	0–0		8,381
11 September 1963	Bradford City (A)	2–0	Gibbs, Godfrey	2,399
14 September 1963	Hartlepools United (A)	0–0		3,022
18 September 1963	Lincoln City (H)	1–0	Hudson	6,949
21 September 1963	Darlington (H)	2–1	Gibbs, Newman	8,269
27 September 1963	Tranmere Rovers (A)	0–0		10,277
2 October 1963	Lincoln City (A)	3–0	Francis (2), Gibbs	8,968
5 October 1963	Halifax Town (H)	2–1	Francis (2)	10,745
9 October 1963	Carlisle United (H)	2–0	Marsden (o.g.), Francis	17,421
12 October 1963	Doncaster Rovers (A)	2–1	Gibbs (2)	6,670
15 October 1963	Carlisle United (A)	1–3	Gibbs	11,900
19 October 1963	Brighton & Hove Albion (H)	1–0	White	13,451
23 October 1963	Torquay United (H)	2–0	Yeo, Gibbs	15,338
26 October 1963	Chester (A)	0–1		8,395
30 October 1963	Torquay United (A)	0–1		4,892
2 November 1963	York City (H)	1–0	Ballagher	9,548
9 November 1963	Barrow (A)	3–0	Gibbs (2), Pulley	3,606
23 November 1963	Oxford United (A)	1–3	Gibbs	8,567
30 November 1963	Workington (H)	3–1	Gibbs (2), Hunt	9,852
14 December 1963	Bradford (Park Avenue) (A)	0–1		4,930
21 December 1963	Southport (H)	5–1	Newman (3), Yeo, Pulley	5,529
26 December 1963	Chesterfield (A)	3–0	Pulley (2), Newman	6,590
28 December 1963	Chesterfield (H)	1–0	Gibbs	10,792
4 January 1964	Rochdale (H)	0–0		8,099
11 January 1964	Exeter City (A)	0–0		10,915
18 January 1964	Hartlepools United (H)	2–0	Newman (2)	7,536
1 February 1964	Darlington (A)	1–1	Pulley	2,814
8 February 1964	Tranmere Rovers (H)	2–2	Newman, Francis	8,166
15 February 1964	Halifax Town (A)	0–0		2,080
22 February 1964	Doncaster Rovers (H)	1–1	Gibbs	7,681
29 February 1964	Brighton & Hove Albion (A)	1–2	Ballagher	15,349
7 March 1964	Chester (H)	2–1	Ridley, Ballagher	5,274
27 March 1964	Aldershot (H)	2–0	Newman, Hunt	12,171
28 March 1964	Stockport County (A)	0–2		2,649
30 March 1964	Aldershot (A)	1–1	Newman	7,183
8 April 1964	Barrow (H)	3–1	Hunt, Burgess, Ridley	11,583
11 April 1964	Workington (A)	0–1		6,536
15 April 1964	Oxford United (H)	2–0	Gibbs, Ballagher	12,051
18 April 1964	Newport County (H)	1–1	Gibbs	9,584
22 April 1964	Stockport County (H)	0–0		12,846
25 April 1964	Rochdale (A)	1–2	Godfrey	2,737
27 April 1964	York City (A)	1–0	Newman	3,317
30 April 1964	Newport County (A)	1–0	Francis	3,229

=== Partial league table ===
Football League Fourth Division final table, leading positions
Pos	Team	Pld	W	D	L	GF	GA	GAv	Pts	Promotion or relegation
1	Gillingham	46	23	14	9	59	30	1.967	60	Division Champions, promoted
2	Carlisle United	46	25	10	11	113	58	1.948	60	Promoted
3	Workington	46	24	11	11	76	52	1.462	59	Promoted
4	Exeter City	46	20	18	8	62	37	1.676	58	Promoted
5	Bradford City	46	25	6	15	76	62	1.226	56	

== Cup matches ==
=== FA Cup ===
As a Fourth Division club, Gillingham entered the 1963–64 FA Cup in the first round; they were beaten 4–1 by Queens Park Rangers of the Third Division.

==== Match details ====
Key

- In result column, Gillingham's score shown first
- H = Home match
- A = Away match
- pen. = Penalty kick
- o.g. = Own goal

Results

Date	Round	Opponents	Result	Goalscorers	Attendance
16 November 1963	First	Queens Park Rangers (A)	1–4	Arnott	12,141

=== Football League Cup ===
Gillingham entered the 1963–64 Football League Cup at the first round stage and were drawn to play Bristol City of the Third Division. Peter Stringfellow scored twice, his only goals of the season, in a 4–2 win for Gillingham. In the second round, Gillingham played at home to Bury of the Second Division; despite playing a team from two divisions higher, Gillingham won 3–0. Their third round opponents were Bristol Rovers of the Third Division; the initial match at Eastville Stadium in Bristol ended in a 1–1 draw, necessitating a replay at Priestfield, which Gillingham won 3–1 to reach the fourth round (last 16) of the competition. Their opponents at this stage were Leicester City of the First Division, the highest level of English football. Playing at their opponents' Filbert Street stadium, Gillingham lost 4–1 and were eliminated from the competition. Although Leicester were missing five regular starters, the correspondent from the Daily Herald noted that they "made rings round Gillingham's defence".

==== Match details ====
Key

- In result column, Gillingham's score shown first
- H = Home match
- A = Away match
- pen. = Penalty kick
- o.g. = Own goal

Results

Date	Round	Opponents	Result	Goalscorers	Attendance
4 September 1963	First	Bristol City (H)	4–2	Stringfellow (2), Waldock, Gibbs	5,940
25 September 1963	Second	Bury (H)	3–0	Pulley (2), Eastham (o.g.)	14,979
4 November 1963	Third	Bristol Rovers (A)	1–1	Ballagher	10,149
6 November 1963	Third (replay)	Bristol Rovers (H)	3–1	Newman (2), Pulley	10,771
27 November 1963	Fourth	Leicester City (A)	1–4	Francis	10,356

== Players ==
During the season, 22 players made at least one appearance for Gillingham. Mike Burgess and John Simpson made the most; both played in all 52 competitive matches. Alec Farrall and Gibbs both missed only one game and four other players made more than 40 appearances. Taylor was the sole player to make only one appearance; he played once in November, after which he did not feature in the first team for nearly 18 months.

Gibbs finished the season as the team's top scorer, with 18 goals in all competitions. His 17 goals scored in Fourth Division matches took his total number of Football League goals for Gillingham over 100, the first player to achieve this feat. Newman was the second-highest scorer with 11 goals in the Fourth Division and 13 in all competitions.

Player statistics
Player	Position	Fourth Division		FA Cup		League Cup		Total	
Player	Position	Apps	Goals	Apps	Goals	Apps	Goals	Apps	Goals
John Arnott	HB	43	0	1	1	5	0	49	1
John Ballagher	FW	17	4	1	0	1	1	19	5
Mike Burgess	HB	46	1	1	0	5	0	52	1
Don Campbell	FB	1	0	0	0	1	0	2	0
Alec Farrall	HB	45	1	1	0	5	0	51	1
George Francis	FW	16	7	0	0	3	1	19	8
Brian Gibbs	FW	46	17	1	0	4	1	51	18
Peter Godfrey	FW	13	2	0	0	0	0	13	2
Geoff Hudson	FB	36	1	1	0	4	0	41	1
Denis Hunt	FB	43	3	1	0	5	0	49	3
John Meredith	FW	11	0	0	0	0	0	11	0
Roy Moss	FW	2	0	0	0	0	0	2	0
Ron Newman	FW	37	11	1	0	4	2	42	13
Gordon Pulley	FW	31	6	1	0	5	3	37	9
Bob Ridley	FW	7	2	0	0	2	0	9	2
John Simpson	GK	46	0	1	0	5	0	52	0
Terry Stacey	FB	12	0	0	0	0	0	12	0
Peter Stringfellow	FW	25	0	0	0	3	2	28	2
Rod Taylor	HB	1	0	0	0	0	0	1	0
Ronnie Waldock	FW	6	0	0	0	1	1	7	1
Jimmy White	FB	11	1	1	0	2	0	14	1
Brian Yeo	FW	11	2	0	0	0	0	11	2

FW = Forward, HB = Half-back, GK = Goalkeeper, FB = Full-back

== Aftermath ==
With the Fourth Division championship not confirmed until the final match, Gillingham did not receive the trophy until June, when it was presented to club chairman Clifford Grossmark at a formal reception at the Cafe Royal in London. The club received a pay-out of £500 (equivalent to £10,000 in 2025) from the Football League for winning the title. In the team's first season in the Third Division, they finished in 7th place, four points off a second consecutive promotion. Gillingham spent seven seasons in the Third Division before being relegated back to the Fourth in 1971. The club did not reach the last 16 of the League Cup again until the 1996–97 season. The 1963–64 Fourth Division remained Gillingham's only Football League divisional championship win for nearly fifty years, until the club again won the championship of the fourth tier of English football (by now called Football League Two) in the 2012–13 season.
