= 1971–72 Cambridge United F.C. season =

Cambridge United
1971–72 season
- Manager: (England) Bill Leivers
- Football League Fourth Division: 10th
- FA Cup: Second round
- League Cup: First round
- Top goalscorer: Brian Greenhalgh (19)
Home colours

The 1971–72 season was Cambridge United's 2nd season in the Football League.

== Final league table ==
Pos	Team	Pld	W	D	L	GF	GA	GAv	Pts	Promotion or relegation
8	Peterborough United	46	17	16	13	82	64	1.281	50	Qualified for the Watney Cup (Note: The two teams who scored the most goals in each division, and did not qualify for Europe and were not promoted, qualified for the Watney Cup.)
9	Bury	46	19	12	15	73	59	1.237	50	
10	Cambridge United	46	17	14	15	62	60	1.033	48	
11	Colchester United	46	19	10	17	70	69	1.014	48	
12	Doncaster Rovers	46	16	14	16	56	63	0.889	46	

Source: rsssf.com

== Results ==
=== Legend ===
Win	Draw	Loss

=== Football League Fourth Division ===
Match	Date	Opponent	Venue	Result	Attendance	Scorers
1	14 August 1971	Chester	A	1 – 1	4,541	Akers
2	21 August 1971	Northampton Town	H	1 – 1	5,638	Foote
3	27 August 1971	Southport	A	1 – 4	3,388	Akers
4	1 September 1971	Gillingham	A	0 – 2	6,424	
5	4 September 1971	Crewe Alexandra	H	3 – 2	3,909	Phillips, Horrey, Hollett
6	11 September 1971	Bury	A	1 – 0	2,602	Greenhalgh
7	18 September 1971	Darlington	H	6 – 0	4,621	Greenhalgh (4), Collins, Carr (o.g.)
8	25 September 1971	Lincoln City	A	1 – 3	5,679	Phillips
9	29 September 1971	Exeter City	H	0 – 1	4,924	
10	2 October 1971	Aldershot	H	1 – 1	4,781	Phillips
11	9 October 1971	Doncaster Rovers	A	1 – 1	3,521	Phillips
12	16 October 1971	Chester	H	2 – 0	3,289	Phillips, Harris
13	20 October 1971	Workington	A	1 – 0	3,983	Phillips
14	23 October 1971	Colchester United	H	4 – 2	7,320	Harris (2), Foote, Lill
15	30 October 1971	Newport County	A	0 – 3	3,824	
16	6 November 1971	Reading	H	4 – 1	5,159	Foote, Lill, Eades, Greenhalgh
17	12 November 1971	Stockport County	A	0 – 3	2,389	
18	27 November 1971	Barrow	A	1 – 1	1,031	Walton
19	4 December 1971	Southend United	H	1 – 1	6,260	Greenhalgh
20	18 December 1971	Crewe Alexandra	A	1 – 1	1,868	Phillips
21	27 December 1971	Grimsby Town	H	3 – 1	8,591	Phillips, Walton, Lill
22	1 January 1972	Darlington	A	1 – 2	3,198	Hollett
23	8 January 1972	Southport	H	0 – 0	4,723	
24	15 January 1972	Hartlepool United	A	2 – 1	2,369	Harris, Collins
25	22 January 1972	Exeter City	A	4 – 3	3,649	Walton (2), Lill, Greenhalgh
26	5 February 1972	Brentford	H	1 – 1	6,861	Walker
27	12 February 1972	Colchester United	H	1 – 1	5,663	Lill
28	19 February 1972	Newport County	H	0 – 1	4,618	
29	26 February 1972	Reading	A	0 – 1	6,608	
30	4 March 1972	Stockport County	H	2 – 0	3,913	Collins, Greenhalgh
31	9 March 1972	Peterborough United	A	0 – 2	4,950	
32	11 March 1972	Doncaster Rovers	H	1 – 1	3,207	Greenhalgh
33	15 March 1972	Hartlepool United	H	2 – 1	3,619	Conlon, Guild
34	18 March 1972	Northampton Town	A	2 – 1	3,781	Collins, Greenhalgh
35	20 March 1972	Workington	H	0 – 0	4,826	
36	25 March 1972	Bury	H	0 – 2	4,413	
37	31 March 1972	Aldershot	A	1 – 1	4,437	Greenhalgh
38	1 April 1972	Grimsby Town	A	1 – 2	12,741	Foote
39	3 April 1972	Lincoln City	H	0 – 0	6,588	
40	8 April 1972	Brentford	A	1 – 2	9,061	Greenhalgh
41	11 April 1972	Scunthorpe United	A	1 – 2	6,145	Pointer
42	15 April 1972	Barrow	H	1 – 0	3,887	Lill
43	19 April 1972	Peterborough United	H	2 – 5	4,248	Greenhalgh (2)
44	21 April 1972	Southend United	A	2 – 1	17,303	Greenhalgh (2)
45	26 April 1972	Gillingham	H	2 – 1	3,260	Greenhalgh, Conlon
46	29 April 1972	Scunthorpe United	H	2 – 0	3,927	Greenhalgh, Conlon

=== FA Cup ===
Round	Date	Opponent	Venue	Result	Attendance	Scorers
R1	20 November 1971	Weymouth	H	2 – 0	4,643	Hollett, Collins
R2	11 December 1971	Bristol Rovers	A	0 – 3	8,788	

=== League Cup ===
Round	Date	Opponent	Venue	Result	Attendance	Scorers
R1	17 August 1971	Fulham	A	0 – 4	8,360	

== Squad statistics ==
Pos.	Name	League		FA Cup		League Cup		Total	
Pos.	Name	Apps	Goals	Apps	Goals	Apps	Goals	Apps	Goals
DF	(England) Vic Akers	45	2	2	0	1	0	48	2
DF	(England) Jack Bannister	6(2)	0	0	0	1	0	7(2)	0
MF	(England) John Collins	40(1)	4	2	1	1	0	43(1)	5
FW	(England) Bryan Conlon	13	3	0	0	0	0	13	3
DF	(Northern Ireland) Terry Eades	44	1	2	0	1	0	47	1
MF	(England) Chris Foote	38(2)	4	2	0	1	0	41(2)	4
FW	(England) Brian Greenhalgh	44	19	1	0	1	0	46	19
DF	(Scotland) Alan Guild	44	1	2	0	1	0	47	1
MF	(England) George Harris	11(1)	4	0	0	0	0	11(1)	4
FW	(England) Ivan Hollett	8(1)	2	1	1	0(1)	0	9(2)	3
MF	(England) Roly Horrey	5(1)	1	0	0	0	0	5(1)	1
MF	(England) David Lill	42(3)	1	0	0	1	0	6(1)	1
MF	(Scotland) John Murray	3	0	0	0	0	0	3	0
FW	(England) Peter Phillips	33(1)	8	2	0	1	0	35(1)	8
MF	(England) Keith Pointer	4(2)	1	0	0	0	0	4(2)	1
GK	(England) Trevor Roberts	21	0	2	0	1	0	24	0
DF	(England) Jimmy Thompson	40	0	2	0	0	0	42	0
GK	(England) Peter Vasper	25	0	0	0	0	0	25	0
MF	(England) Dennis Walker	12(6)	1	0	0	1	0	13(6)	1
MF	(England) Ronnie Walton	25	4	1	0	0	0	26	4
DF	(England) Jimmy White	3(2)	0	1	0	0	0	4(2)	0
