= 1970–71 Cambridge United F.C. season =

Cambridge United
1970–71 season
- Manager: Bill Leivers
- Stadium: Abbey Stadium
- Fourth Division: 20th
- FA Cup: Second round
- League Cup: First round
- Top goalscorer: Ivan Hollett (11)
Home colours

The 1970–71 season was Cambridge United's first season in the Football League.

On 30 May 1970 Bradford Park Avenue failed to be re-elected to the Football League and Cambridge United were voted to take their place. They had a quiet start to life as a football league club finishing in 20th position with 43 points.

== Final league table ==
| Pos | Team | Pld | W | D | L | GF | GA | GAv | Pts | Promotion or relegation |
|---|---|---|---|---|---|---|---|---|---|---|
| 18 | Southend United | 46 | 14 | 15 | 17 | 53 | 66 | 0.803 | 43 | |
| 19 | Grimsby Town | 46 | 18 | 7 | 21 | 57 | 71 | 0.803 | 43 | |
| 20 | Cambridge United | 46 | 15 | 13 | 18 | 51 | 66 | 0.773 | 43 | |
| 21 | Lincoln City | 46 | 13 | 13 | 20 | 70 | 71 | 0.986 | 39 | Re-elected |
| 22 | Newport County | 46 | 10 | 8 | 28 | 55 | 85 | 0.647 | 28 | Re-elected |

Source: rsssf.com

== Results ==
=== Legend ===
| Win | Draw | Loss |

=== Football League Fourth Division ===
| Match | Date | Opponent | Venue | Result | Attendance | Scorers |
|---|---|---|---|---|---|---|
| 1 | 15 August 1970 | Lincoln City | H | 1 – 1 | 6,843 | Meldrum |
| 2 | 22 August 1970 | Northampton Town | A | 1 – 2 | 7,901 | Walker |
| 3 | 29 August 1970 | Oldham Athletic | H | 3 – 1 | 5,435 | Cassidy, Harris, Leggett |
| 4 | 31 August 1970 | Brentford | H | 1 – 0 | 6,654 | Meldrum |
| 5 | 5 September 1970 | Scunthorpe United | A | 0 – 0 | 4,149 | |
| 6 | 12 September 1970 | Southport | H | 0 – 0 | 3,843 | |
| 7 | 19 September 1970 | Crewe Alexandra | A | 2 – 1 | 2,224 | Lindsay, McKinven |
| 8 | 23 September 1970 | Chester | A | 1 – 2 | 5,982 | Hardy |
| 9 | 26 September 1970 | Hartlepool United | H | 2 – 0 | 5,225 | McKinven, Howell |
| 10 | 30 September 1970 | Aldershot | A | 2 – 2 | 5,739 | Cassidy, Meldrum |
| 11 | 3 October 1970 | Bournemouth | A | 0 – 3 | 7,116 | |
| 12 | 10 October 1970 | Peterborough United | H | 1 – 1 | 7,570 | Gregson |
| 13 | 17 October 1970 | Lincoln City | A | 1 – 0 | 7,132 | Walker |
| 14 | 19 October 1970 | Stockport County | H | 1 – 1 | 4,650 | Leggett |
| 15 | 24 October 1970 | Exeter City | A | 0 – 1 | 5,631 | |
| 16 | 31 October 1970 | Southend United | H | 0 – 3 | 5,701 | |
| 17 | 7 November 1970 | Grimsby Town | A | 0 – 2 | 7,472 | |
| 18 | 9 November 1970 | Workington | H | 1 – 2 | 4,238 | Leggett |
| 19 | 14 November 1970 | Newport County | H | 3 – 2 | 3,608 | Harris (2), Hollett |
| 20 | 28 November 1970 | Barrow | A | 1 – 2 | 2,129 | Hollett |
| 21 | 5 December 1970 | Colchester United | H | 2 – 1 | 5,183 | Harris, Horrey |
| 22 | 19 December 1970 | Northampton Town | H | 0 – 2 | 4,814 | |
| 23 | 26 December 1970 | Notts County | A | 1 – 4 | 15,722 | Hollett |
| 24 | 2 January 1971 | Darlington | H | 2 – 0 | 3,866 | Cassidy |
| 25 | 9 January 1971 | Aldershot | H | 1 – 1 | 4,823 | Cassidy |
| 26 | 15 January 1971 | Stockport County | A | 1 – 0 | 2,340 | Horrey |
| 27 | 30 January 1971 | Barrow | H | 3 – 3 | 3,803 | Cassidy, White, Garbett (o.g.) |
| 28 | 5 February 1971 | Colchester United | A | 1 – 2 | 6,469 | Horrey |
| 29 | 13 February 1971 | York City | H | 1 – 1 | 4,593 | Hollett |
| 30 | 20 February 1971 | Workington | A | 1 – 3 | 2,114 | Collins |
| 31 | 26 February 1971 | Southend United | A | 1 – 1 | 6,827 | Harris |
| 32 | 1 March 1971 | York City | A | 0 – 3 | 3,138 | |
| 33 | 6 March 1971 | Exeter City | H | 2 – 0 | 3,803 | Collins (2) |
| 34 | 8 March 1971 | Chester | H | 1 – 1 | 3,576 | Hollett |
| 35 | 12 March 1971 | Newport County | A | 0 – 2 | 2,587 | |
| 36 | 15 March 1971 | Darlington | A | 0 – 2 | 2,809 | |
| 37 | 20 March 1971 | Grimsby Town | H | 2 – 3 | 3,929 | Collins, Hollett |
| 38 | 27 March 1971 | Scunthorpe United | H | 1 – 1 | 3,657 | White |
| 39 | 3 April 1971 | Oldham Athletic | A | 1 – 4 | 8,242 | Hollett |
| 40 | 9 April 1971 | Southport | A | 1 – 0 | 2,885 | Hollett |
| 41 | 10 April 1971 | Notts County | H | 2 – 1 | 6,935 | Hollett, Harris |
| 42 | 13 April 1971 | Bournemouth | H | 0 – 2 | 6,027 | |
| 43 | 17 April 1971 | Peterborough United | A | 3 – 2 | 5,068 | Hollett (2), Foote |
| 44 | 24 April 1971 | Crewe Alexandra | H | 1 – 0 | 4,370 | Meldrum |
| 45 | 26 April 1971 | Brentford | A | 2 – 1 | 5,994 | Harris, Eades |
| 46 | 1 May 1971 | Hartlepool United | A | 0 – 0 | 1,767 | |

=== FA Cup ===
| Round | Date | Opponent | Venue | Result | Attendance | Scorers |
|---|---|---|---|---|---|---|
| R1 | 21 November 1970 | Enfield | A | 1 – 0 | 2,941 | Hollett |
| R2 | 12 December 1970 | Colchester United | A | 0 – 3 | 7,348 | |

=== League Cup ===
| Round | Date | Opponent | Venue | Result | Attendance | Scorers |
|---|---|---|---|---|---|---|
| R1 | 19 August 1970 | Colchester United | A | 0 – 5 | 6,952 | |

== Squad statistics ==
| Pos. | Name | League | | FA Cup | | League Cup | | Total | |
| Pos. | Name | Apps | Goals | Apps | Goals | Apps | Goals | Apps | Goals |
|---|---|---|---|---|---|---|---|---|---|
| MF | (Scotland) Bill Cassidy | 27(5) | 6 | 1 | 0 | 0 | 0 | 28(5) | 6 |
| MF | (England) John Collins | 27(5) | 6 | 1 | 0 | 0 | 0 | 28(5) | 6 |
| DF | (Northern Ireland) Terry Eades | 45 | 1 | 2 | 0 | 1 | 0 | 48 | 1 |
| MF | (England) Chris Foote | 11 | 1 | 0 | 0 | 0 | 0 | 11 | 1 |
| DF | (Scotland) Brian Grant | 14 | 0 | 1 | 0 | 0(1) | 0 | 15(1) | 0 |
| MF | (England) John Gregson | 32 | 1 | 2 | 0 | 0 | 0 | 34 | 1 |
| MF | (England) Robin Hardy | 15(1) | 1 | 2 | 0 | 1 | 0 | 18(1) | 1 |
| MF | (England) George Harris | 22(1) | 7 | 1 | 0 | 1 | 0 | 24(1) | 7 |
| FW | (England) Ivan Hollett | 29 | 11 | 2 | 1 | 0 | 0 | 31 | 12 |
| MF | (England) Roly Horrey | 32 | 3 | 1(1) | 0 | 0 | 0 | 33(1) | 3 |
| MF | (England) Ron Howell | 12 | 1 | 1 | 0 | 0 | 0 | 13 | 1 |
| MF | (England) Peter Leggett | 21 | 3 | 1 | 0 | 1 | 0 | 23 | 3 |
| FW | (England) Mal Lindsay | 6 | 1 | 0 | 0 | 1 | 0 | 7 | 1 |
| MF | (Scotland) John McKinven | 18 | 2 | 1 | 0 | 1 | 0 | 20 | 2 |
| DF | (Scotland) Colin Meldrum | 36(1) | 4 | 1 | 0 | 1 | 0 | 38(1) | 4 |
| FW | (England) Peter Phillips | 1 | 0 | 0 | 0 | 0 | 0 | 1 | 0 |
| GK | (England) Trevor Roberts | 15 | 0 | 0 | 0 | 1 | 0 | 16 | 0 |
| MF | (England) Mel Slack | 33(2) | 0 | 2 | 0 | 1 | 0 | 35(2) | 0 |
| DF | (England) Jimmy Thompson | 32(1) | 0 | 2 | 0 | 1 | 0 | 35(1) | 0 |
| GK | (England) Peter Vasper | 31 | 0 | 2 | 0 | 0 | 0 | 33 | 0 |
| MF | (England) Robin Wainwright | 1 | 0 | 0 | 0 | 0 | 0 | 1 | 0 |
| MF | (England) Dennis Walker | 32(2) | 2 | 0 | 0 | 1 | 0 | 33(2) | 2 |
| DF | (England) Jimmy White | 25 | 2 | 0 | 0 | 0 | 0 | 25 | 2 |
