= 1972–73 Cambridge United F.C. season =

Cambridge United
1972–73 season
- Manager: Bill Leivers
- Football League Fourth Division: 3rd
- FA Cup: First round
- League Cup: First round
- Top goalscorer: Brian Greenhalgh (18)
Home colours

The 1972–73 season was Cambridge United's 3rd season in the Football League.

Cambridge had a fine season finishing in 3rd position and thus gaining promotion to the Third Division after only three seasons in the Football League.

== Final league table ==
Pos	Team	Pld	W	D	L	GF	GA	GAv	Pts	Promotion or relegation
1	Southport (C, P)	46	26	10	10	71	48	1.479	62	Promotion to the Third Division
2	Hereford United (P)	46	23	12	11	56	38	1.474	58	Promotion to the Third Division
3	Cambridge United (P)	46	20	17	9	67	57	1.175	57	Promotion to the Third Division
4	Aldershot (P)	46	22	12	12	60	38	1.579	56	Promotion to the Third Division
5	Newport County	46	22	12	12	64	44	1.455	56	

Source: rsssf.com
(C) Champions; (P) Promoted

== Results ==
=== Legend ===
Win	Draw	Loss

=== Football League Fourth Division ===
Match	Date	Opponent	Venue	Result	Attendance	Scorers
1	12 August 1972	Darlington	H	0–3	3,478	
2	19 August 1972	Barnsley	A	1–3	2,808	Walker
3	26 August 1972	Doncaster Rovers	H	3–1	2,941	Brookes (o.g.), Collins, Phillips
4	30 August 1972	Mansfield Town	A	1–3	5,216	Lill
5	2 September 1972	Exeter City	A	1–3	3,249	Pointer
6	9 September 1972	Hartlepool United	H	1–1	2,647	Lill
7	16 September 1972	Newport County	A	2–0	3,564	Lill, Greenhalgh
8	20 September 1972	Stockport County	H	1–0	2,952	Robinson
9	23 September 1972	Peterborough United	H	3–1	4,378	Lill, Greenhalgh, Collins
10	26 September 1972	Gillingham	A	2–1	2,173	Collins, Greenhalgh
11	30 September 1972	Northampton Town	A	2–2	3,439	Collins, Watson
12	7 October 1972	Bradford City	H	2–1	3,960	Collins, Greenhalgh
13	11 October 1972	Hereford United	H	1–0	4,112	Phillips
14	13 October 1972	Southport	A	1–1	4,108	Phillips
15	20 October 1972	Colchester United	H	3–0	4,465	Noble (o.g.), Collins, Ross
16	25 October 1972	Crewe Alexandra	A	1–1	1,701	Walton
17	28 October 1972	Chester	A	1–1	3,605	Ross
18	4 November 1972	Gillingham	H	3–1	4,656	Collins, Lill, Walton
19	10 November 1972	Stockport County	A	2–2	3,165	Lill (2)
20	25 November 1972	Workington	A	1–5	1,112	Eades
21	2 December 1972	Torquay United	H	0–0	3,244	
22	9 December 1972	Northampton Town	H	3–1	3,539	Lill, Greenhalgh (2)
23	16 December 1972	Bury	H	1–1	2,337	Greenhalgh
24	23 December 1972	Aldershot	H	2–2	3,918	Collins, Greenhalgh
25	26 December 1972	Peterborough United	A	1–1	7,577	Greenhalgh
26	30 December 1972	Barnsley	H	1–1	3,864	Lill
27	6 January 1973	Doncaster Rovers	A	0–0	1,735	
28	20 January 1973	Exeter City	H	1–3	3,979	Watson
29	27 January 1973	Hartlepool United	A	0–0	3,036	
30	31 January 1973	Crewe Alexandra	H	1–0	3,074	Greenhalgh
31	3 February 1973	Hereford United	A	1–2	8,907	Greenhalgh
32	10 February 1973	Newport County	H	3–1	3,496	Watson, Lill, Phillips
33	17 February 1973	Darlington	A	3–3	1,412	Lill, Ross, Watson
34	24 February 1973	Bury	H	2–2	3,768	Greenhalgh (2)
35	2 March 1973	Bradford City	A	1–0	5,031	Ross
36	7 March 1973	Lincoln City	H	2–1	3,736	Watson, Phillips
37	10 March 1973	Southport	H	2–2	5,504	Ross (2)
38	16 March 1973	Colchester United	A	1–0	3,888	Ross
39	21 March 1973	Reading	A	0–1	5,589	
40	24 March 1973	Chester	H	1–0	3,935	Lill
41	31 March 1973	Workington	H	1–0	4,028	Greenhalgh
42	7 April 1973	Torquay United	A	2–1	4,014	Greenhalgh (2)
43	14 April 1973	Reading	H	1–0	6,033	Ross
44	21 April 1973	Lincoln City	A	1–2	4,801	Greenhalgh
45	24 April 1973	Aldershot	A	1–1	10,800	Greenhalgh
46	28 April 1973	Mansfield Town	H	3–2	11,542	Ross, Walton (2)

=== FA Cup ===
Round	Date	Opponent	Venue	Result	Attendance	Scorers
R1	18 November 1972	Bournemouth	A	1–5	10,034	Collins

=== League Cup ===
Round	Date	Opponent	Venue	Result	Attendance	Scorers
R1	16 August 1972	Brentford	A	0–1	7,750	

== Squad statistics ==
Pos.	Name	League		FA Cup		League Cup		Total	
Pos.	Name	Apps	Goals	Apps	Goals	Apps	Goals	Apps	Goals
DF	(England) Vic Akers	32	0	1	0	1	0	34	0
DF	(England) Jack Bannister	16	0	0	0	1	0	17	0
DF	(England) Martin Binks	1	0	0	0	0	0	1	0
FW	(England) John Collins	35(3)	8	1	1	0	0	36(3)	9
FW	(England) Bryan Conlon	4(1)	0	0	0	1	0	5(1)	0
DF	(Northern Ireland) Terry Eades	38	1	1	0	1	0	40	1
MF	(England) Chris Foote	19(6)	0	1	0	1	0	21(6)	0
FW	(England) Brian Greenhalgh	45	18	1	0	1	0	47	18
DF	(Scotland) Alan Guild	41(1)	0	1	0	0	0	42(1)	0
MF	(England) David Lill	45	12	1	0	1	0	47	12
FW	(England) Peter Phillips	6(12)	5	0	0	0	0	6(12)	5
MF	(England) Keith Pointer	2	1	0	0	0	0	2	1
DF	(Wales) Graham Rathbone	13	0	0	0	0	0	13	0
FW	(England) Terry Robinson	6	1	0	0	0	0	6	1
MF	(Scotland) Bobby Ross	32	9	1	0	0	0	33	9
FW	(England) Dave Simmons	0(3)	0	0	0	0	0	0(3)	0
GK	(England) Graham Smith	12	0	0	0	0	0	12	0
DF	(England) Jimmy Thompson	45	0	1	0	1	0	47	0
GK	(England) Peter Vasper	34	0	1	0	1	0	36	0
MF	(England) Dennis Walker	4	1	1	0	0	0	5	1
MF	(England) Ronnie Walton	37	5	1	0	1	0	39	5
MF	(England) Graham Watson	39	4	0	0	0	0	39	4
