= 1973–74 Cambridge United F.C. season =

Cambridge United
1973–74 season
- Manager: (England) Bill Leivers
- Football League Third Division: 21st
- FA Cup: Third round
- League Cup: Second round
- Top goalscorer: Brian Greenhalgh (10)
Home colours

The 1973–74 season was Cambridge United's 4th season in the Football League.

After gaining promotion to the Third Division last season, Cambridge struggled to adapt to the tougher challenge and were relegated back to the Fourth Division.

== Final league table ==
Pos	Team	Pld	W	D	L	GF	GA	GAv	Pts	Promotion or relegation
19	Brighton & Hove Albion	46	16	11	19	52	58	0.897	43	
20	Port Vale	46	14	14	18	52	58	0.897	42	
21	Cambridge United (R)	46	13	9	24	48	81	0.593	35	Relegation to the Fourth Division
22	Shrewsbury Town (R)	46	10	11	25	41	62	0.661	31	Relegation to the Fourth Division
23	Southport (R)	46	6	16	24	35	82	0.427	28	Relegation to the Fourth Division

Source: rsssf.com
(R) Relegated

== Results ==
=== Legend ===
Win	Draw	Loss

=== Football League Third Division ===
Match	Date	Opponent	Venue	Result	Attendance	Scorers
1	25 August 1973	Southport	H	2 – 0	4,656	Ross, O'Donnell
2	1 September 1973	Huddersfield Town	A	1 – 2	5,559	Lennard
3	8 September 1973	Shrewsbury Town	H	2 – 1	4,553	Ross, Greenhalgh
4	10 September 1973	Port Vale	A	1 – 2	5,829	Watson
5	14 September 1973	Southend United	A	1 – 3	6,629	O'Donnell
6	19 September 1973	Watford	H	3 – 2	5,090	Greenhalgh, Watson, Simmons
7	22 September 1973	Oldham Athletic	H	1 – 1	5,620	Greenhalgh
8	29 September 1973	Bristol Rovers	A	0 – 1	9,127	
9	3 October 1973	Watford	A	0 – 3	6,470	
10	6 October 1973	York City	H	0 – 0	4,447	
11	13 October 1973	Hereford United	A	0 – 0	8,522	
12	20 October 1973	Blackburn Rovers	A	0 – 2	6,327	
13	24 October 1973	Port Vale	H	4 – 2	3,612	Ferguson, Foote, Greenhalgh, Lennard
14	27 October 1973	Halifax Town	H	0 – 1	4,630	
15	3 November 1973	Grimsby Town	A	0 – 1	7,186	
16	10 November 1973	Charlton Athletic	H	1 – 0	4,856	Greenhalgh
17	17 November 1973	Aldershot	H	1 – 2	3,866	Ross
18	8 December 1973	Bournemouth	A	0 – 1	8,582	
19	22 December 1973	Bristol Rovers	H	2 – 2	4,485	Greenhalgh (2)
20	26 December 1973	Walsall	A	0 – 3	4,591	
21	29 December 1973	Shrewsbury Town	A	0 – 2	3,368	
22	1 January 1974	Huddersfield Town	H	2 – 2	5,667	Greenhalgh, Ross
23	12 January 1974	Southend United	H	3 – 2	4,255	Greenhalgh, Ferguson, Lill
24	19 January 1974	Southport	A	0 – 0	1,534	
25	27 January 1974	Brighton & Hove Albion	H	1 – 1	7,749	Simmons
26	2 February 1974	Chesterfield	H	1 – 2	4,223	Ferguson
27	5 February 1974	Rochdale	A	2 – 0	588	Simmons, Greenhalgh
28	17 February 1974	Hereford United	H	2 – 0	5,728	Ferguson, Lennard
29	24 February 1974	York City	A	0 – 2	7,387	
30	3 March 1974	Walsall	H	0 – 0	4,569	
31	5 March 1974	Oldham Athletic	A	1 – 6	9,428	Lennard
32	10 March 1974	Halifax Town	A	1 – 0	2,455	Lennard
33	13 March 1974	Chesterfield	A	0 – 3	3,287	
34	16 March 1974	Blackburn Rovers	H	0 – 2	4,655	
35	23 March 1974	Charlton Athletic	A	0 – 2	3,702	
36	27 March 1974	Tranmere Rovers	H	1 – 0	3,975	Cassidy
37	30 March 1974	Grimsby Town	H	0 – 1	3,658	
38	3 April 1974	Brighton & Hove Albion	A	1 – 4	9,833	Ross
39	6 April 1974	Rochdale	H	3 – 3	2,704	Cassidy, Shinton (2)
40	12 April 1974	Wrexham	A	1 – 2	4,591	Shinton
41	13 April 1974	Aldershot	A	0 – 6	5,074	
42	16 April 1974	Wrexham	H	2 – 1	2,391	Shinton, Cassidy
43	20 April 1974	Bournemouth	H	2 – 1	3,398	Watson, Batson
44	22 April 1974	Tranmere Rovers	A	2 – 5	2,796	Lennard, Akers
45	27 April 1974	Plymouth Argyle	A	1 – 4	5,078	Cassidy
46	1 May 1974	Plymouth Argyle	H	3 – 1	1,979	Shinton, Akers (2)

=== FA Cup ===
Round	Date	Opponent	Venue	Result	Attendance	Scorers
R1	24 November 1973	Gillingham	H	3 – 2	4,831	Simmons (3)
R2	15 December 1973	Aldershot	A	2 – 1	4,244	Simmons (2)
R3	6 January 1974	Oldham Athletic	H	2 – 2	8,479	Eades, Wood (o.g.)
R3 Replay	8 January 1974	Oldham Athletic	A	3 – 3 (aet)	10,250	Ferguson, Simmons, Watson
R3 2nd Replay	14 January 1974	Oldham Athletic	N	1 – 2	3,563	Simmons

=== League Cup ===
Round	Date	Opponent	Venue	Result	Attendance	Scorers
R1	29 August 1973	Aldershot	A	1 – 1	4,147	Greenhalgh
R1 Replay	5 September 1973	Aldershot	H	3 – 0	4,801	Ross, Lennard, Watson
R2	9 October 1973	Bury	A	0 – 2	6,150	

== Squad statistics ==
Pos.	Name	League		FA Cup		League Cup		Total	
Pos.	Name	Apps	Goals	Apps	Goals	Apps	Goals	Apps	Goals
DF	(England) Vic Akers	41(2)	3	5	0	3	0	49(2)	3
DF	(England) Jack Bannister	6(2)	0	3	0	0	0	9(2)	0
DF	(England) Brendon Batson	16	1	0	0	0	0	16	1
FW	(England) Nigel Cassidy	9	4	0	0	0	0	9	4
DF	(Northern Ireland) Terry Eades	41	0	5	1	3	0	49	1
MF	(England) Mike Ferguson	39	4	5	1	3	0	47	5
MF	(England) Chris Foote	8(2)	1	0	0	0(1)	0	8(3)	1
FW	(England) Brian Greenhalgh	27	10	5	0	3	1	35	11
DF	(Scotland) Alan Guild	32(9)	0	2	0	2	0	36(9)	0
DF	(England) Allan Harris	6	0	0	0	0	0	6	0
MF	(England) Dave Lennard	36	6	2	0	3	1	41	7
MF	(England) David Lill	35(2)	1	2	0	2	0	39(2)	1
DF	(England) Jon O'Donnell	35	2	5	0	3	0	43	2
DF	(Wales) Graham Rathbone	22(1)	0	2	0	2	0	26(1)	0
MF	(Scotland) Bobby Ross	25(8)	5	4	0	3	1	32(8)	6
DF	(England) Ray Seary	6(1)	0	0	0	0	0	6(1)	0
FW	(England) Bobby Shinton	13	5	0	0	0	0	13	5
FW	(England) Dave Simmons	19(2)	3	5	7	1	0	25(2)	10
GK	(England) Peter Vasper	46	0	5	0	3	0	54	0
MF	(England) Graham Watson	44	3	5	1	2	1	51	5
