= 1974–75 Cambridge United F.C. season =

Cambridge United
1974–75 season
- Manager: (England) Bill Leivers (England) Ron Atkinson
- Football League Fourth Division: 6th
- FA Cup: Third round
- League Cup: First round
- Top goalscorer: Bobby Shinton (15)
Home colours

The 1974–75 season was Cambridge United's fifth season in the Football League.

== Final league table ==
Pos	Team	Pld	W	D	L	GF	GA	GAv	Pts	Promotion or relegation
4	Chester (P)	46	23	11	12	64	38	1.684	57	Promotion to the Third Division
5	Lincoln City	46	21	15	10	79	48	1.646	57	
6	Cambridge United	46	20	14	12	62	44	1.409	54	
7	Reading	46	21	10	15	63	47	1.340	52	
8	Brentford	46	18	13	15	53	45	1.178	49	

Source: rsssf.com
(P) Promoted

== Results ==
=== Football League Fourth Division ===
Match	Date	Opponent	Venue	Result	Attendance	Scorers
1	17 August 1974	Reading	A	0–2	5,117	
2	23 August 1974	Workington	H	3–0	2,816	Lill (2), Shinton
3	31 August 1974	Torquay United	A	0–1	2,832	
4	3 September 1974	Chester	H	3–0	2,736	Shinton (2), Howell
5	6 September 1974	Bradford City	H	0–1	3,586	
6	14 September 1974	Brentford	A	0–1	5,313	
7	17 September 1974	Barnsley	A	1–1	6,002	Shinton
8	21 September 1974	Lincoln City	H	5–0	2,825	Shinton, Tully, Cassidy (2), Ellis (o.g.)
9	24 September 1974	Mansfield Town	H	2–2	3,627	Tully, Lyon
10	28 September 1974	Darlington	A	0–6	2,304	
11	1 October 1974	Hartlepool United	H	3–2	2,774	Howell, D Smith
12	4 October 1974	Southport	H	1–0	2,518	Cassidy
13	12 October 1974	Scunthorpe United	A	0–2	2,167	
14	15 October 1974	Shrewsbury Town	H	0–2	2,661	
15	18 October 1974	Exeter City	H	1–1	1,858	D Smith
16	23 October 1974	Chester	A	1–1	3,790	Cassidy
17	26 October 1974	Crewe Alexandra	A	0–0	2,436	
18	1 November 1974	Northampton Town	H	3–4	3,589	Baston, Shinton (2)
19	9 November 1974	Rochdale	A	0–0	1,116	
20	16 November 1974	Newport County	H	1–1	2,827	Cassidy
21	30 November 1974	Rotherham United	H	0–0	2,881	
22	6 December 1974	Stockport County	A	0–1	1,843	
23	21 December 1974	Doncaster Rovers	A	1–0	1,677	Tully
24	26 December 1974	Brentford	H	2–0	3,959	Lyon, Watson
25	28 December 1974	Shrewsbury Town	A	0–1	4,570	
26	11 January 1975	Stockport County	H	1–0	3,001	Tully
27	14 January 1975	Barnsley	H	2–0	2,906	Baston, Cassidy
28	18 January 1975	Rotherham United	A	0–0	4,131	
29	1 February 1975	Rochdale	H	1–1	3,118	Tully
30	8 February 1975	Northampton Town	A	2–1	4,126	Horsfall (2)
31	15 February 1975	Swansea City	H	2–0	3,004	Tully, Watson
32	22 February 1975	Newport County	A	2–1	3,219	Horsfall, O'Donnell
33	28 February 1975	Torquay United	H	3–1	3,181	Horsfall (2), Baston
34	4 March 1975	Swansea City	A	1–2	1,520	O'Donnell
35	7 March 1975	Mansfield Town	A	1–2	9,174	O'Donnell
36	14 March 1975	Darlington	H	1–0	2,173	Shinton
37	18 March 1975	Reading	H	1–0	2,871	O'Donnell
38	22 March 1975	Bradford City	A	1–1	2,837	Baston
39	28 March 1975	Doncaster Rovers	H	4–1	4,159	Shinton (2), Eades, P Smith
40	31 March 1975	Lincoln City	A	0–0	8,292	
41	4 April 1975	Crewe Alexandra	H	2–0	3,054	Horsfall, Watson
42	7 April 1975	Hartlepool United	A	1–1	1,627	Shinton
43	11 April 1975	Southport	H	2–2	1,025	Shinton, Tully
44	19 April 1975	Scunthorpe United	H	2–0	3,728	O'Donnell, Cassidy
45	23 April 1975	Workington	A	2–1	1,208	Shinton (2)
46	26 April 1975	Exeter City	A	4–1	2,924	Shinton, Horsfall, Bond (o.g.), Munks (o.g.)

=== FA Cup ===
Round	Date	Opponent	Venue	Result	Attendance	Scorers
R1	23 November 1974	Hitchin Town	A	0–0	4,222	
R1 Replay	26 November 1974	Hitchin Town	H	3–0	2,827	Cassidy (2), Shinton
R2	14 December 1974	Hereford United	H	2–0	3,850	Watson (2)
R3	4 January 1975	Mansfield Town	A	0–1	10,486	

=== League Cup ===
Round	Date	Opponent	Venue	Result	Attendance	Scorers
R1	21 August 1974	Southend United	A	0–2	5,868	

== Squad statistics ==
Pos.	Name	League		FA Cup		League Cup		Total	
Pos.	Name	Apps	Goals	Apps	Goals	Apps	Goals	Apps	Goals
DF	(England) Vic Akers	4(5)	0	0	0	0	0	4(5)	0
DF	(England) Brendon Batson	34(1)	4	4	0	1	0	39(1)	4
FW	(England) Nigel Cassidy	34	7	4	2	1	0	40	9
DF	(Northern Ireland) Terry Eades	39	1	4	0	1	0	44	1
DF	(England) Steve Fallon	6(2)	0	0	0	0	0	6(2)	0
FW	(England) Carl Gilder	0(1)	0	0	0	0	0	0(1)	0
DF	(England) Mel Green	3	0	0	0	0	0	3	0
MF	(Scotland) Tommy Horsfall	18(2)	7	0	0	0	0	18(2)	7
DF	(England) Graham Howell	39	2	3	0	1	0	43	2
MF	(England) Dave Lennard	3(1)	0	0	0	0	0	3(1)	0
MF	(England) David Lill	32(1)	2	4	0	1	0	37(1)	2
DF	(England) Dave Lyon	42	2	4	0	1	0	47	2
DF	(England) Jon O'Donnell	31	5	3	0	1	0	35	5
DF	(England) Ray Seary	33	0	4	0	1	0	38	0
FW	(England) Bobby Shinton	41	15	4	1	1	0	46	16
FW	(England) Dave Smith	15(2)	3	1(1)	0	0	0	16(3)	3
GK	(England) Graham Smith	45	0	4	0	1	0	50	0
MF	(England) Paul Smith	15(2)	1	0	0	0	0	15(2)	1
MF	(England) Kevin Tully	35(3)	7	1(1)	0	0	0	36(4)	7
GK	(England) Phil Walker	1	0	0	0	0	0	1	0
MF	(England) Graham Watson	36(2)	3	4	2	1	0	41(2)	5
