= Peter Godfrey =

Peter Godfrey may refer to:

- Peter Godfrey (MP) (1665–1724), British merchant and politician
- Peter Godfrey (director) (1899–1970), English-American actor and theatre/film/television director
- Peter Godfrey (writer) (1917-1992) South African writer, playwright and broadcaster
- Peter Godfrey (choral conductor) (1922–2017), New Zealand choral conductor
- Peter Godfrey (footballer, born 1938), English football outside right
- Peter Godfrey (footballer, born 1957), Scottish football central defender

== See also ==
- Godfrey (name)
