= William Cassidy (disambiguation) =

William Cassidy may refer to:

- Bill Cassidy (born 1957), American politician
- William A. Cassidy, American geologist
- Bill Cassidy (footballer, born 1917) (1917–1962), English footballer with Gateshead
- Bill Cassidy (footballer, born 1940) (1940–1995), Scottish footballer with Rotherham United, Brighton & Hove Albion, Detroit Cougars and others
- William F. Cassidy (1908–2002), American military commander
