= John McKinven =

Scottish footballer

Personal information
- Full name: John James McKinven
- Date of birth: 1 May 1941
- Place of birth: Campbeltown, Scotland
- Date of death: 25 July 2014 (aged 73)
- Place of death: Wishaw, Scotland
- Position: Left winger

Senior career*
| Years | Team | Apps | (Gls) |
| – | Bathgate Thistle | | |
| 1959–1960 | Raith Rovers | 6 | (0) |
| 1960–1969 | Southend United | 286 | (62) |
| 1969–1971 | Cambridge United | 18 | (2) |
| 1971–1972 | Pegasus Athletic | | |
- * Club domestic league appearances and goals

John James McKinven (1 May 1941 – 25 July 2014) was a Scottish footballer who played as a left winger in the Scottish Football League for Raith Rovers and in the English Football League for Southend United and Cambridge United.

== Life and career ==
McKinven was born in Campbeltown in 1941. He played Junior football for Bathgate Thistle before joining the senior ranks with Raith Rovers in November 1958. He made his debut during the 1959–60 Scottish Division One season, and made six league appearances in all.

In May 1960, McKinven moved to England where he joined Southend United of the Third Division as what the club website's history section dubs a "brilliant signing" who "would thrill Roots Hall for the best part of a decade". He scored 62 goals from 286 league matches for Southend United, and was the club's joint top scorer in the 1967–68 season. In October 1968, he suffered a broken leg as a result of a late tackle by Lincoln City's Graham Taylor, and missed the rest of the season.

In December 1969, he moved on to Cambridge United, helped them win their second consecutive Southern League title and gain election to the Football League Fourth Division, and took the corner kick from which Colin Meldrum scored the club's first ever Football League goal on the opening day of the 1970–71 season.

On 17 September 1971, McKinven signed for Essex Senior League club Pegasus Athletic.

McKinven was married to Pamela; the couple had two children, Kelli and Guy. He died in Wishaw in 2014 at the age of 73.
