= Peter Leggett =

English footballer

Personal information
- Full name: Peter Robert Leggett
- Date of birth: 16 December 1943
- Place of birth: Newton-le-Willows, England
- Date of death: 2 November 2016 (aged 72)
- Place of death: Chelmsford, England
- Position: Right winger

Senior career*
Years	Team	Apps	(Gls)
1961–1962	Weymouth	6	(0)
1962–1965	Swindon Town	15	(1)
1965–1966	Brighton & Hove Albion	3	(0)
1966–1969	Chelmsford City		
1969–1971	Cambridge United		
1969–1970	→ Lincoln City (loan)	0	(0)
- * Club domestic league appearances and goals

Peter Robert Leggett (16 December 1943 — 2 November 2016) was an English footballer who played as a right winger.

== Career ==
Born in Newton-le-Willows, Leggett began his senior career with Weymouth in 1961, making six appearances for the club. In May 1962, Leggett joined Third Division club Swindon Town for £1,000. Leggett made 17 appearances in all competitions over the course of two seasons for Swindon, scoring once. In July 1965, Leggett signed for Brighton & Hove Albion, making three Football League appearances. In 1966, Leggett joined Chelmsford City. During his time at the club, Leggett was part of the Chelmsford side that won the 1967–68 Southern League.

In March 1969, Leggett signed for Southern League rivals Cambridge United, following manager Bill Leivers' recruitment of ex-Chelmsford teammates Terry Butcher, Bill Cassidy and Terry Eades. In Leggett's first full season at Cambridge, the club won the 1969–70 Southern League, winning election to the Football League in the process. On 29 August 1970, Leggett recorded a goal and an assist in a 3–1 home win against Oldham Athletic in Cambridge's first Football League victory. Leggett made 69 appearances for Cambridge, scoring seven times, retiring in 1971 due to injuries.
