= Rod Taylor (disambiguation) =

Rod Taylor (Rodney Sturt Taylor, 1930–2015) was an Australian-born American actor.

Rod Taylor may also refer to:

- Rod Taylor (American football) (born 1994), American football player
- Rod Taylor (singer) (born 1957), reggae singer and producer, born in Jamaica
- Rod Taylor (skier) (Roderick G. Taylor, 1943–2014), member of U.S. Olympic Ski Team
- Rod Taylor (ice hockey) (born 1967), American ice hockey player
- Rod Taylor (footballer) (1943–2018), English footballer
- Roderick Taylor, American poet, screenwriter and artist, a.k.a. Rod Falconer
- Rodney Taylor (Rodney Graham Taylor, 1940–2002), chief of the Royal Australian Navy, 1994-1997
