= Colin Meldrum =

Colin Meldrum may refer to:

- Colin Meldrum (footballer, born 1941), Scottish football player and manager (Reading)
- Colin Meldrum (footballer, born 1975), Scottish football goalkeeper and coach (Kilmarnock)
