= Wayne Harrison (footballer, born 1957) =

English footballer and manager

Personal information
- Full name: Wayne Moffat Harrison
- Date of birth: 16 October 1957 (age 69)
- Place of birth: Whitehaven, England
- Height: 5 ft 6 in (1.68 m)
- Position: Midfielder

Senior career*
| Years | Team | Apps | (Gls) |
| 1974–1975 | Everton | 0 | (0) |
| 1975–1978 | Workington | 4 | (0) |
| 1978–1979 | Sheffield Wednesday | 0 | (0) |
| 1979–1982 | Blackpool | 86 | (6) |
| 1983–1984 | Oulun Palloseura | 38 | (7) |
| 1984–1985 | Barrow 30 | | |
| Various years 3 separate times | Workington | 122 | (16) |
| 1987–1988 | Carlisle United | 2 | (0) |

Managerial career
- 1985–1986: Workington (player–manager)
- 1995–1997: Workington
- 1997–1998: Bamber Bridge
- 1999: Accrington Stanley
- * Club domestic league appearances and goals

Wayne Moffat Harrison (born 16 October 1957) is an English former professional footballer. He played for a number of teams in the Football League throughout his career, making over 90 league appearances. Alongside spells in non-league football, Harrison had a short foray into Finnish football in the 1980s when he signed for Oulun Palloseura and spent two seasons playing in their Premier Professional league and playing in 38 games.

He managed Workington and Bamber Bridge in the Northern Premier League and was Assistant Manager at Lancaster City. In the 1998–99 season, Harrison had a short spell as manager of then Northern Premier League side Accrington Stanley.

He then went on to be the Academy Director of Youth at Blackpool Football club for four years before moving to the United States to further his career.

== Playing career ==
Harrison began his career as an amateur with Everton but did not make a first-team appearance for the club and returned to his native Cumbria ahead of the 1975–76 season, signing for professional Football League Fourth Division side Workington. He made four league appearances for the Reds, three of them as a substitute, before transferring to Sheffield Wednesday. However, he again failed to break into the senior side and left the club in September 1979 without having played in a league game. His subsequent move to Blackpool proved more successful and it was there that he enjoyed the best spell of his playing career, featuring in 86 league matches over the following three seasons. After his release from Blackpool in 1982, Harrison had trial spells with both Preston North End and Burnley, where he made one appearance as a substitute in a Lancashire Senior Cup match, but was not offered a permanent deal by either club having sustained a serious injury at the time.

During the 1983 and 1984 seasons, Harrison assisted professional Premier league Finnish club Oulun Palloseura, scoring 7 goals in 38 league matches. He also had a spell playing indoor football in the United States, before returning to England to join Football Conference outfit Barrow in the 1984–85 campaign. In the summer of 1985, he was appointed player–manager of former club Workington, who had since been relegated to the Northern Premier League after failing re-election to the Football League several years previously. He spent just over a season in charge at Borough Park before resigning in November 1986 guiding them to 8th place in the league in his first season. He was the youngest manager in the country at 28 years old at the time. He had one final playing spell with Fourth Division side Carlisle United, making two league appearances, before retiring in 1988.

== Coaching career ==
Following his retirement from playing, Harrison worked towards his coaching badges and completed his UEFA "A" licence in 1996. He spent time as a youth team coach at Carlisle before returning to Workington for a third spell with the club, and a second stint as manager, in January 1995. He guided the team to a 16th-placed finish in his first full season in charge in 1995–96 but left the club midway through the following campaign. Harrison was then assistant manager to Gordon Raynor at Lancaster City for a time in 1997 before resuming his managerial career when he was appointed as manager at Bamber Bridge later the same year. He steered the team clear of relegation during his sole season in charge, leading to a move to Accrington Stanley following the dismissal of Billy Rodaway in December 1998. Harrison tendered his resignation at Accrington Stanley to take up a full-time post as the Director of Coaching for Youth at Blackpool F.C.

The Accrington job proved to be Harrison's last in a managerial role. He subsequently spent four years as director of the Centre of Excellence at his former club Blackpool before moving to the United Arab Emirates to take up a post as Youth Director at Al Ain.
