= John Ballagher =

English footballer

John Ballagher (born 21 March 1936) was an English footballer. He played professionally for Sheffield Wednesday, Doncaster Rovers and Gillingham between 1957 and 1964, making a total of 85 Football League appearances.

== Career ==
An inside-forward, he joined Sheffield Wednesday in 1956 from Stalybridge Celtic but was unable to command a first-team place, largely because of the consistency of Keith Ellis and in February 1961 he was allowed to join Doncaster Rovers in a deal which brought John Meredith to Sheffield. In 1962 Ballagher was transferred to Gillingham.
