= John Simpson (footballer, born 1933) =

English footballer

Personal information
- Full name: John Lionel Simpson
- Date of birth: 5 October 1933
- Place of birth: Appleby-in-Westmorland, England
- Date of death: 7 December 1993 (aged 60)
- Place of death: Gillingham, England
- Position: Goalkeeper

Senior career*
Years	Team	Apps	(Gls)
1954–1957	Netherfield		
1957	Lincoln City	5	(0)
1957–1972	Gillingham	571	(0)
1972	→ Margate (loan)		
1972	Maidstone United		
- * Club domestic league appearances and goals

John Lionel Simpson (5 October 1933 – 7 December 1993) was an English football goalkeeper. He spent fifteen years playing for Gillingham, for whom he holds the all-time record for the most matches played in the Football League.

== Career ==
Simpson began his professional career with Lincoln City, having been spotted playing for Netherfield in the Lancashire Combination but only managed five first-team appearances for the Sincil Bank club before Gillingham snapped him up in the summer of 1957 for just £750. For the next fifteen years he was the Gills' first-choice goalkeeper, helping them win the Fourth Division championship in the 1963–64 season, during which he let in just 30 goals, a club record which stood until 1995–96. He won the Kent side's Player of the Year award in consecutive seasons (1969–70, 1970–71). Such was his standing at the club Chairman Clifford Grossmark was reported to have commented regarding interest from other clubs that "John Simpson's value to Gillingham Football Club far exceeded all offers". In 1972, after a club record 571 Football League appearances, he left the professional game to see out his career with non-league Maidstone United, but in 1975 he returned to Priestfield Stadium to play for Gillingham's reserves due to an injury crisis.

After his retirement he ran a newsagent's close to Priestfield Stadium. He died in 1993, aged 60. His record tally of 571 league appearances for Gillingham remains intact to this day, fellow goalkeeper Ron Hillyard's career having been ended by injury just 8 matches short of the record, although Hillyard made more appearances than Simpson in all competitions.

== Honours ==
Individual

- Gillingham Player of the Season: 1969–70, 1970–71
