= Bobby Ross (footballer, born 1942) =

Scottish football player and coach (1942–2026)

Personal information
- Full name: Robert Herdman Ross
- Date of birth: 18 May 1942
- Place of birth: Edinburgh, Scotland
- Date of death: August 2026 (aged 84)
- Height: 5 ft 9 in (1.75 m)
- Positions: Forward; midfielder

Youth career
- Tynecastle Athletic
- Musselburgh Athletic

Senior career*
| Years | Team | Apps | (Gls) |
| 1960–1963 | Heart of Midlothian | 24 | (3) |
| 1963–1966 | Shrewsbury Town | 99 | (29) |
| 1966–1972 | Brentford | 292 | (52) |
| 1972–1974 | Cambridge United | 65 | (14) |
| 1974–1978 | Hayes | 121 | (19) |
| Total | | 601 | (117) |

Managerial career
- 1976–1978: Hayes
- 1978: Hayes
- * Club domestic league appearances and goals

Robert Herdman Ross (18 May 1942 – August 2026) was a Scottish professional footballer and coach. He spent six years as a forward and midfielder in the Football League with Brentford, for whom he made 323 appearances. For over two decades he worked in the youth system at Queens Park Rangers and retired in 2008. Ross is a member of the Brentford Hall Of Fame.

== Playing career ==
=== Heart of Midlothian ===
Growing up in Edinburgh, Scotland, Ross began his career at local junior clubs Tynecastle Athletic and Musselburgh Athletic, before signing for reigning Scottish League First Division champions Heart of Midlothian in November 1960. His professional debut came on 1 April 1961, when aged just 18, he appeared in a 1–1 draw with Raith Rovers. Ross made two further appearances towards the end of the 1960–61 season. Still aged just 18, Ross began to force his way into the first team during the 1961–62 season and made 20 appearances, scoring three goals. He also made his first European appearance for the club, playing in a 3–1 Inter-Cities Fairs Cup first round first leg victory over Union Saint-Gilloise on 27 September 1961. Ross was frequently left out of the team during the 1962–63 season and made just 9 appearances. He departed the club in June 1963, after making 32 appearances and scoring four goals during his three seasons at Tynecastle.

=== Shrewsbury Town ===
Ross moved to England and joined Third Division club Shrewsbury Town in June 1963. He made 39 appearances and scored five goals during the 1963–64 season. He improved his stats during the 1964–65 season, missing just two league games and scoring 19 goals, though his form couldn't help the Shrews improve on another mid-table finish. 1965–66 was another mid-table season for the Shrews, with Ross scoring five goals in 16 appearances. He departed the club in March 1966, after making 99 league appearances and scoring 29 goals for Shrewsbury Town during his 2 1/2 seasons with the club.

=== Brentford ===
Ross joined Third Division club Brentford in a £9,500 double deal with Shrewsbury Town teammate John Regan in March 1966. In a troubled period for the West London club, Ross' time with the Bees got off to a bad start, failing to score in 17 league appearances and suffering relegation to the Fourth Division at the end of the campaign. In the Fourth Division, Ross quickly established himself as regular first team player, making 53 appearances and scoring 9 league goals during the 1966–67 season and winning the London Challenge Cup. He was placed on the transfer list at his own request in 1968, but the matter was resolved during the 1968–69 pre-season. Ross registered his first double-digit tally of goals for the club during the 1969–70 season, scoring 13 league goals and featuring as an ever-present in league matches. Remarkably durable, a spell of 162 consecutive appearances meant that as of September 2026, Ross continues to remain in second-place on the Brentford record consecutive appearances list.

Ross' greatest moment in a Brentford shirt came towards the end of the 1971–72 season, when he coolly converted a penalty against Exeter City to seal promotion back to the Third Division. He made only 9 appearances during the 1972–73 season before departing the club in October 1972, after his contract was cancelled by mutual consent. Ross made 323 appearances during his six years with the Bees and scored 56 goals. He spent much of his time as club captain. Ross was recognised for his achievements in December 2013, when he was added to the Brentford Hall Of Fame.

=== Cambridge United ===
Ross dropped back down to the Fourth Division to sign for Cambridge United on a free transfer in October 1972. He was an immediate hit with the club, making 32 league appearances and scoring 9 goals on the way to the club's first ever promotion to the third tier. Back in the Third Division, Ross made 33 league appearances and scored five goals during the 1973–74 season and he left the club after their relegation straight back to the Fourth Division was confirmed at the end of the campaign. He made 65 league appearances and scored 14 goals for the Us.

=== Hayes ===
Ross returned to London to sign for Isthmian League First Division club Hayes during the 1974 off-season. Moving back into midfield, he made 121 appearances and scored 19 goals in four years with the club and retired at the end of the 1977–78 season.

== Managerial and coaching career ==
=== Hayes ===
Ross took up coaching when he became player-assistant manager to player-manager Allan Harris at Hayes in 1974. He remained in the role after Harris departed in March 1975, serving under Bob Gibbs until October 1976, when he became Hayes' player-manager. He narrowly staved off relegation to the Isthmian League Second Division during the 1976–77 season and achieved a mid-table finish in the new Isthmian League Premier Division in 1977–78. Ross was sacked in April 1978, only to be reinstated and sacked again two months later.

=== Queens Park Rangers ===
Ross joined Queens Park Rangers' Centre of Excellence as a coach in 1978. When Rangers moved up to Academy status, Ross became schoolboy development officer and also assisted at the club's training ground in his later years. He retired from football in August 2008.

== Personal life and death ==
During the 1970s, Ross lived in Southall and worked at Associated Equipment Company as a chassis inspector.

Ross died in August 2026, aged 84.

== Career statistics ==
Appearances and goals by club, season and competition
| Club | Season | League | | | National cup (Note: Includes Scottish Cup, FA Cup) | | League cup (Note: Includes Scottish League Cup, Football League Cup) | | Europe | | Total | |
| Club | Season | Division | Apps | Goals | Apps | Goals | Apps | Goals | Apps | Goals | Apps | Goals |
|---|---|---|---|---|---|---|---|---|---|---|---|---|
| Heart of Midlothian | 1960–61 | Scottish First Division | 3 | 0 | 0 | 0 | 0 | 0 | — | | 3 | 0 |
| Heart of Midlothian | 1961–62 | Scottish First Division | 13 | 2 | 1 | 0 | 5 | 1 | 1 (Note: Appearance in Inter-Cities Fairs Cup) | 0 | 20 | 3 |
| Heart of Midlothian | 1962–63 | Scottish First Division | 8 | 1 | 0 | 0 | 1 | 0 | — | | 9 | 1 |
| Heart of Midlothian | Total | | 24 | 3 | 1 | 0 | 6 | 1 | 1 | 0 | 32 | 4 |
| Brentford | 1965–66 | Third Division | 17 | 0 | — | | — | | — | | 17 | 0 |
| Brentford | 1966–67 | Fourth Division | 46 | 9 | 4 | 0 | 3 | 1 | — | | 53 | 10 |
| Brentford | 1967–68 | Fourth Division | 41 | 2 | 2 | 0 | 1 | 0 | — | | 44 | 2 |
| Brentford | 1968–69 | Fourth Division | 44 | 0 | 2 | 0 | 3 | 0 | — | | 49 | 0 |
| Brentford | 1969–70 | Fourth Division | 46 | 13 | 2 | 0 | 3 | 0 | — | | 51 | 13 |
| Brentford | 1970–71 | Fourth Division | 46 | 15 | 5 | 1 | 1 | 0 | — | | 52 | 16 |
| Brentford | 1971–72 | Fourth Division | 45 | 13 | 2 | 1 | 1 | 1 | — | | 48 | 15 |
| Brentford | 1972–73 | Third Division | 7 | 0 | — | | 2 | 0 | — | | 9 | 0 |
| Brentford | Total | | 292 | 52 | 17 | 2 | 14 | 2 | — | | 323 | 56 |
| Cambridge United | 1972–73 | Fourth Division | 32 | 9 | 1 | 0 | — | | — | | 33 | 9 |
| Cambridge United | 1973–74 | Third Division | 33 | 5 | 4 | 0 | 3 | 1 | — | | 40 | 6 |
| Cambridge United | Total | | 65 | 14 | 5 | 0 | 3 | 1 | — | | 72 | 15 |
| Career total | | | 381 | 69 | 23 | 2 | 23 | 4 | 1 | 0 | 428 | 75 |

== Honours ==
Cambridge United

- Football League Fourth Division third-place promotion: 1972–73

Brentford

- Football League Fourth Division third-place promotion: 1971–72
- London Challenge Cup: 1966–67

Individual

- Brentford Supporters' Player of the Year: 1969–70, 1970–71
- Brentford Hall of Fame
