= George Aitken (footballer, born 1928) =

Scottish footballer and manager

Personal information
- Full name: George Bruce Aitken
- Date of birth: 13 August 1928
- Place of birth: Dalkeith, Scotland
- Date of death: August 2006
- Place of death: Brighton, England
- Position: Centre half

Youth career
- Edinburgh Thistle

Senior career*
Years	Team	Apps	(Gls)
1946–1953	Middlesbrough	17	(0)
1953–1960	Workington	262	(3)

Managerial career
- 1971–1974: Workington
- * Club domestic league appearances and goals

George Bruce Aitken (13 August 1928 – August 2006) was a Scottish professional football player and manager.

== Playing career ==
Aitken started his career with Edinburgh Thistle, essentially a junior side for Hibernian, but in June 1946 was signed by David Jack for Middlesbrough.

The first person to score in a Wembley final and the first player to be sold for £10,000, Jack was already a legend by the time he took over as Middlesbrough manager in 1944.

As for Aitken he made his debut against Fulham in the 1951–52 season, but struggled to establish himself at Ayresome Park and moved to Workington for a fee of £5,000 in July 1953.

He quickly established himself in the Workington defence, going on to make 262 league appearances before retiring in 1960.

== Coaching and managerial career ==
On his retirement he became trainer at Workington, first under Joe Harvey and then under Ken Furphy. Furphy left to manager Watford in 1964 and Aitken followed him to Vicarage Road. He remained with Watford until 1971 when he left to become manager of Workington.

In his first season in charge, Workington finished sixth in Division Four, but the club was in general decline and a 13th position finish the following season was followed by two successive bottom four finishes (and successful applications for re-election). Aitken left after the second of these in May 1974.

He was assistant manager of Grimsby Town between 1975 and 1976 when he left to coach Brighton & Hove Albion. He stayed at Brighton for eight years, and became reserve team manager until he was appointed joint first team manager with Jimmy Melia in December 1982, leading Brighton to the FA Cup semi-final for the first time in March 1983, after which Melia was appointed as sole permanent manager. He later had spells scouting for Watford, Aston Villa and England (all under Graham Taylor).

He died in August 2006, aged 78.
