= Terry Stacey (footballer) =

English footballer

Terence John Stacey (born 28 September 1936) was an English professional footballer of the 1960s. He played in the Football League for Plymouth Argyle and Gillingham, making 39 appearances in total.
