= Tommy Horsfall =

Scottish footballer

Personal information
- Full name: Thomas William Horsfall
- Date of birth: 7 January 1951 (age 75)
- Place of birth: Hamilton, Scotland
- Position: Winger

Senior career*
Years	Team	Apps	(Gls)
- Canterbury City
- Dover
1972–1974	Southend United	16	(1)
1973	→Bury (loan)	1	(1)
1973	→Scunthorpe (loan)	5	(2)
1974–1977	Cambridge United	83	(28)
1977	Halifax Town	16	(3)
- Dover
- * Club domestic league appearances and goals

Thomas William Horsfall (born 7 January 1951 in Hamilton, South Lanarkshire) is a Scottish former footballer.

== Playing career ==
=== Southend United ===
Horsfall spent two years at Southend United but was unable to hold down a regular first team spot.

=== Scunthorpe ===
While on loan at Scunthorpe Horsfall scored twice in his debut however did not score again in his five-game stint.

=== Cambridge United ===
In 1974 Horsfall signed for Cambridge United where he played 83 matches from 1974 to 1977.
