= Peter Stringfellow (footballer) =

English footballer (born 1939)

Personal information
- Date of birth: 21 February 1939 (age 87)
- Place of birth: Walkden, England
- Position: Inside forward

Senior career*
| Years | Team | Apps | (Gls) |
- Walkden Town
| | Manchester City | 0 | (0) |
| 1958–1960 | Oldham Athletic | 54 | (16) |
- GKN Sankey
| 1962–1964 | Gillingham | 35 | (2) |
| 1964–1965 | Chesterfield | 28 | (7) |
- * Club domestic league appearances and goals

Peter Stringfellow (born 21 February 1939) is an English former professional footballer. He played for Oldham Athletic, Gillingham and Chesterfield between 1958 and 1965, making more than 100 appearances in the Football League, but his professional career came to an end after he was involved in a car crash which killed a teammate.

== Career ==
Stringfellow was born in Walkden in Lancashire and began his career playing for local team Walkden Town. He had a short spell with Manchester City but never played a match for the club. He moved to nearby Oldham Athletic in December 1958. An inside forward, he spent two seasons with the club, playing 54 times in the Football League and scoring 16 goals. He was the team's top scorer during the 1959–60 season with 11 goals, but was then forced to leave the club when he was posted to Malaya with the Royal Air Force.

He later played for the non-league club GKN Sankey, based in Wellington, Shropshire, and then, upon leaving the Air Force, joined Gillingham in December 1962. He made his debut for the club the following April in a home match against Newport County. In the 1963–64 season he made 25 appearances and helped the club to win the championship of the Football League Fourth Division. At the end of the season, however, manager Freddie Cox decided that Stringfellow would not feature in his plans at the higher level, and the player moved to Chesterfield in an exchange deal which saw Charlie Rackstraw move in the opposite direction. Stringfellow made 28 appearances for the "Spireites", scoring seven goals, but in December 1964 he was involved in a car crash in which teammate Ralph Hunt (the brother of Stringfellow's former Gillingham teammate Dennis Hunt) was killed and two other players injured. Stringfellow had been driving the car which crashed, but no responsibility was attached to him for the accident. Nonetheless, following the accident, his form dramatically declined and he was allowed to leave Saltergate at the end of the season. He chose to emigrate to Australia, and no details are known of his subsequent life.
