= Gordon Pulley =

English footballer (1936–2024)

Personal information
- Full name: Gordon Albert Pulley
- Date of birth: 18 September 1936
- Place of birth: Stourbridge, England
- Date of death: 23 December 2024 (aged 88)
- Position: Winger

Senior career*
Years	Team	Apps	(Gls)
- Stourbridge
- Oswestry Town
1956–1958	Millwall	60	(9)
1958–1965	Gillingham	203	(46)
1965–1966	Peterborough United	17	(4)
1966–1968	Chelmsford City		
1968–1970	Ramsgate Athletic		
1970–1971	Folkestone		

Managerial career
- 1971–?: Sheppey United
- * Club domestic league appearances and goals

Gordon Albert Pulley (18 September 1936 – 23 December 2024) was an English professional footballer who played as a winger. His clubs included Millwall, Gillingham, where he made over 200 Football League appearances, and Peterborough United. Following retirement he managed Sheppey United. Born in Stourbridge on 18 September 1936, he died on 23 December 2024, at the age of 88.
