= John Arnott (English footballer) =

English footballer

Personal information
- Full name: John Henry Arnott
- Date of birth: 6 September 1932
- Place of birth: Sydenham, England
- Date of death: 31 March 2017 (aged 84)
- Positions: Right half; centre-forward

Senior career*
Years	Team	Apps	(Gls)
1954–1955	West Ham United	6	(2)
1955–1956	Shrewsbury Town	30	(6)
1956–1962	Bournemouth & Boscombe Athletic	173	(21)
1962–1969	Gillingham	186	(2)
1969–1976	Dover		
- * Club domestic league appearances and goals

John Henry Arnott (6 September 1932 − 31 March 2017) was an English professional footballer. His clubs included West Ham United, Shrewsbury Town, Bournemouth & Boscombe Athletic and Gillingham, where he made 186 Football League appearances.

== Career ==
Born in Sydenham, Arnott began his career as an amateur for West Ham United and played for them from 1954 to 1955. He had one season with Shrewsbury Town before joining Bournemouth & Boscombe Athletic in 1956, where he spent six seasons and made 176 league appearances before being transferred to Gillingham in August 1962. Arnott's last club was Dover from 1969 to 1976.

== Personal life ==
Arnott was a teacher who spent 23 years teaching physical education at Kingsdale Secondary School, Dulwich, south London.
