= Peter Godfrey (footballer, born 1957) =

Scottish footballer

Personal information
- Date of birth: October 22, 1957 (age 69)
- Place of birth: Falkirk, Scotland
- Position: Central defender

Youth career
- Linlithgow Rose

Senior career*
Years	Team	Apps	(Gls)
1980	Stenhousemuir (trialist)	2	(1)
1980–1984	Meadowbank Thistle	126	(12)
1984–1991	St Mirren	174	(8)
1991–1992	Falkirk	27	(2)
1992–1993	Arbroath	11	(2)
1993–1995	Stenhousemuir	68	(1)
- Linlithgow Rose
Total		408	(26)
- * Club domestic league appearances and goals

Peter Godfrey (born 22 October 1957) is a Scottish former professional footballer.
