= Mike Burgess (footballer) =

English footballer (1932–2021)

Personal information
- Full name: Michael Burgess
- Date of birth: 17 April 1932
- Place of birth: Montreal, Quebec, Canada
- Date of death: 17 June 2021 (aged 89)
- Place of death: Poole, England
- Position: Centre half

Youth career
- Bradford City

Senior career*
Years	Team	Apps	(Gls)
1952–1953	Bradford (Park Avenue)	0	(0)
1953–1956	Leyton Orient	31	(12)
1956–1957	Newport County	23	(7)
1957–1961	Bournemouth & Boscombe Athletic	109	(34)
1961–	Halifax Town	34	(3)
–1966	Gillingham	110	(2)
	Aldershot	6	(0)
- Canterbury City
- * Club domestic league appearances and goals

Michael Burgess (17 April 1932 – 17 June 2021) was an English professional footballer. He played for Bradford (Park Avenue), Leyton Orient, Newport County, Bournemouth & Boscombe Athletic, Halifax Town, Gillingham and Aldershot during a 14-year professional career.

== Personal life ==
Burgess was born in Montreal, Quebec, Canada. He died on 17 June 2021 in Dorset at the age of 89.

== Football career ==
He joined Newport County in February 1956 as part of a deal which took Tommy Johnston to Leyton Orient for £4,000. He went on to play 23 times and score seven goals during one and a half seasons in South Wales before leaving at the end of the 1956–57 season.

On the opening day of the 1962–63 season a foul by Burgess injured Crystal Palace winger Stewart Imlach, who was making his Palace debut. This incident is recalled by Gary Imlach in his biography of his father, My Father and other Working Class Football Heroes.
