= Stan Brookes =

English footballer (1953–2025)

- Brookes with KV Mechelen in 1982

Personal information
- Full name: Stanley Kevin Brookes
- Date of birth: 2 February 1953
- Place of birth: Doncaster, England
- Date of death: 11 December 2025 (aged 72)
- Place of death: Tranent, East Lothian, Scotland
- Position: Defender

Youth career
- Doncaster Rovers

Senior career*
Years	Team	Apps	(Gls)
1971–1977	Doncaster Rovers	235	(7)
1977–1983	KV Mechelen		
- * Club domestic league appearances and goals

Stanley Kevin Brookes (2 February 1953 – 11 December 2025) was an English footballer who played for Doncaster Rovers and KV Mechelen as a defender.

== Early life ==
Brookes attended the Percy Jackson Grammar School, Doncaster, 1964 entrant.

== Career ==
=== Doncaster Rovers ===
After playing for the Doncaster Rovers Juniors, Brookes signed a professional contract with club, then in English Division 4, in February 1971. His debut came in a 1–0 home defeat to Barrow on 28 August 1971. His first goal came in the following season on 20 February in a 2–1 win at Chester City.

In April 1975, he took over in goal in a game against Exeter City. Rovers were losing 2–0 at the time and came back to draw 3–3.

He made a total of 263 League and Cup appearances, scoring 7 goals.

=== KV Mechelen ===
Along with fellow Brit Keith Coleman from West Ham, Brookes joined KV Mechelen of the Belgian Second Division for the 1977–78 season, managed by John Talbut. He stayed there for six seasons, including one in the First Division.

== Death ==
Brookes died on 11 December 2025, at the age of 72.

A year earlier, Brookes, suffering from Alzheimer's disease, had appeared in an episode of the Belgian program Pano, which discussed the dangers of heading in football. Soon after he was diagnosed with dementia, this was linked to his footballing past as a header expert.

== Honours ==
Doncaster Rovers

- Sheffield and Hallamshire County Cup winner 1975–76

KV Mechelen

- Belgian Second Division play-offs winner 1980–81
- Belgian Second Division winner 1982–83
