= Alec Farrall =

English footballer (1936–2025)

Personal information
- Date of birth: 3 March 1936
- Place of birth: West Kirby, Cheshire, England
- Date of death: 19 May 2025 (aged 89)
- Place of death: Birkenhead, Merseyside, England
- Position: Midfielder

Youth career
- 1951–1953: Everton

Senior career*
Years	Team	Apps	(Gls)
1953–1957	Everton	5	(0)
1957–1960	Preston North End	27	(9)
1960–1965	Gillingham	202	(19)
1965–1966	Lincoln City	20	(2)
1966–1968	Watford	48	(8)
Total		299	(38)
- * Club domestic league appearances and goals

Alec Farrall (3 March 1936 – 19 May 2025) was an English professional footballer. A midfielder, his clubs included Everton, Preston North End, Gillingham, where he made over 200 Football League appearances, Lincoln City and Watford. Farrall died in the Prenton area of Birkenhead on 19 May 2025, at the age of 89.
