= Graham Howell =

English footballer

Personal information
- Full name: Graham Frank Howell
- Date of birth: 18 February 1951 (age 75)
- Place of birth: Urmston, England
- Position: Full back

Youth career
- Manchester City

Senior career*
Years	Team	Apps	(Gls)
1968–1971	Manchester City	0	(0)
1971–1972	Bradford City	45	(0)
1972–1974	Brighton & Hove Albion	44	(0)
1974–1976	Cambridge United	71	(3)
1976–1982	Västerås SK		
1983–19??	Irsta IF		
Total		160	(3)
- * Club domestic league appearances and goals

Graham Frank Howell (born 18 February 1951) is an English former professional footballer who played as a full back for Manchester City, Bradford City, Brighton & Hove Albion and Cambridge United, making 160 appearances in the Football League. He then spent six seasons with Swedish club Västerås SK, which included a return of 2 goals from 26 appearances in the 1978 Allsvenskan season, and also played for Irsta IF. He remained in Sweden after his playing career finished.
