= Bill Cassidy (footballer, born 1917) =

English footballer

Personal information
- Full name: William Cassidy
- Date of birth: 30 June 1917
- Place of birth: Gateshead, England
- Date of death: 1962 (aged 44–45)
- Place of death: Gateshead, England
- Position: Wing half

Senior career*
| Years | Team | Apps | (Gls) |
| | Close Works | ? | (?) |
| 1936–1953 | Gateshead | 133 | (6) |
- * Club domestic league appearances and goals

William Cassidy (30 June 1917 – 1962) was an English footballer who played as a wing half.

Cassidy started his career with non-league Close Works before signing for Gateshead in January 1936. He scored a total of 6 goals in 138 appearances in league and cup competitions for Gateshead before his retirement in 1953.

== Career statistics ==
Appearances and goals by club, season and competition
| Club | Season | League | | FA Cup | | Third Div. North Cup | | Total | |
| Club | Season | Apps | Goals | Apps | Goals | Apps | Goals | Apps | Goals |
|---|---|---|---|---|---|---|---|---|---|
| Gateshead | 1935–36 | 1 | 0 | 0 | 0 | 0 | 0 | 1 | 0 |
| Gateshead | 1936–37 | 3 | 0 | 0 | 0 | 0 | 0 | 3 | 0 |
| Gateshead | 1937–38 | 14 | 2 | 0 | 0 | 2 | 0 | 16 | 2 |
| Gateshead | 1938–39 | 31 | 1 | 0 | 0 | 2 | 0 | 33 | 1 |
| Gateshead | 1945–46 | — | | 1 | 0 | — | | 1 | 0 |
| Gateshead | 1946–47 | 16 | 1 | 0 | 0 | — | | 16 | 1 |
| Gateshead | 1947–48 | 27 | 1 | 0 | 0 | — | | 27 | 1 |
| Gateshead | 1948–49 | 11 | 0 | 0 | 0 | — | | 11 | 0 |
| Gateshead | 1949–50 | 5 | 1 | 0 | 0 | — | | 5 | 1 |
| Gateshead | 1950–51 | 6 | 0 | 0 | 0 | — | | 6 | 0 |
| Gateshead | 1951–52 | 17 | 0 | 0 | 0 | — | | 17 | 0 |
| Gateshead | 1952–53 | 2 | 0 | 0 | 0 | — | | 2 | 0 |
| Career total | | 133 | 6 | 1 | 0 | 4 | 0 | 138 | 6 |
