= Geoff Hudson =

English footballer

Personal information
- Full name: Geoffrey Alan Hudson
- Date of birth: 14 October 1931
- Place of birth: Leeds, England
- Date of death: 1 December 2015 (aged 84)
- Place of death: Barnsley, England
- Position: Full-back

Senior career*
Years	Team	Apps	(Gls)
1949–1957	Bradford Park Avenue	95	(0)
1957–1959	Bradford City	34	(0)
1959–1961	Halifax Town	52	(0)
1961–1962	Exeter City	41	(0)
1962–1963	Crewe Alexandra	1	(0)
1963–1965	Gillingham	81	(1)
1965–1966	Lincoln City	33	(0)
Total		333	(1)

Managerial career
- 1969–1970: Southend United
- 1988–1991: SC Villa
- * Club domestic league appearances and goals

Geoffrey Alan Hudson (14 October 1931 – December 2015) was an English professional footballer. Born in Leeds, he played for Bradford Park Avenue, Bradford City, Halifax Town, Exeter City, Crewe Alexandra, Gillingham, Lincoln City and Rotherham United between 1950 and 1967. He died in Barnsley in December 2015 at the age of 84.
