= Bob Ridley =

English footballer

Robert Michael Ridley (born 30 May 1942) is an English former professional footballer who played as a winger. After playing for Portsmouth and Gillingham between 1960 and 1967 he moved to South Africa. Ridley coached the Cleveland Cobras of the American Soccer League in 1980.
