= Bryan Conlon =

English footballer

Personal information
- Full name: Bryan Conlon
- Date of birth: 14 January 1943
- Place of birth: Shildon, England
- Date of death: 11 October 2000 (aged 57)
- Place of death: Shildon, England
- Height: 6 ft 1 in (1.85 m)
- Position: Forward

Senior career*
Years	Team	Apps	(Gls)
1961–1962	Newcastle United	0	(0)
1962–1964	South Shields		
1964–1967	Darlington	74	(27)
1967–1969	Millwall	41	(13)
1969–1970	Norwich City	29	(8)
1970–1972	Blackburn Rovers	45	(7)
1971–1972	→ Crewe Alexandra (loan)	4	(1)
1972–1973	Cambridge United	18	(3)
1973–1974	Hartlepool	41	(3)
- Shildon
Total		252	(62)
- * Club domestic league appearances and goals

Bryan Conlon (14 January 1943 – 11 October 2000) was an English footballer who made more than 250 appearances in the Football League playing as a forward.
