= Trevor Roberts (footballer) =

Welsh footballer (1942–1972)

Personal information
- Date of birth: 25 February 1942
- Place of birth: Caernarfon, Wales
- Date of death: June 1972 (aged 30)
- Place of death: Cambridge, England
- Position: Goalkeeper

Youth career
- Liverpool University

Senior career*
Years	Team	Apps	(Gls)
1963–1965	Liverpool	0	(0)
1965–1970	Southend United	171	(0)
1970–1972	Cambridge United	36	(0)
Total		207	(0)
- * Club domestic league appearances and goals

Trevor Roberts (25 February 1942 – June 1972) was a Welsh professional footballer who played as a goalkeeper. He made a total of 207 appearances in the Football League for Southend United and Cambridge United before dying of a brain tumour at the age of 30.

== Career ==
Roberts began his career as a youth player at Liverpool, combining his playing there with studying for a degree in geography at Liverpool University, He then played in the Football League for Southend United and Cambridge United between 1965 and 1972, making 207 appearances.

== Death ==
In 1968 Roberts recovered from lung cancer. In February 1972 he was admitted to hospital with a brain tumour and died in June 1972 in a nursing home, at the age of 30.
