= Roly Horrey =

English footballer (1943–2024)

Personal information
- Full name: Rowland George Horrey
- Date of birth: 7 March 1943
- Place of birth: Bishop Auckland, County Durham, England
- Date of death: 4 December 2024 (aged 81)
- Height: 5 ft 9 in (1.75 m)
- Position: Winger

Senior career*
Years	Team	Apps	(Gls)
1961–1963	Bishop Auckland		
1963	Ferryhill Athletic		
1963–1966	Blackburn Rovers	3	(0)
1966–1968	York City	74	(9)
1968–1972	Cambridge United	38	(4)
1972–	Chelmsford City		
Total		115	(13)
- * Club domestic league appearances and goals

Rowland George "Roly" Horrey (7 March 1943 – 4 December 2024) was an English professional footballer who played as a winger in the Football League for Blackburn Rovers, York City and Cambridge United and in non-League football for Bishop Auckland, Ferryhill Athletic and Chelmsford City. Horrey died on 4 December 2024, at the age of 81.
