= Bobby Shinton =

English footballer and manager (born 1952)

Personal information
- Full name: Robert Thomas Shinton
- Date of birth: 6 January 1952 (age 74)
- Place of birth: West Bromwich, England
- Position: Right winger

Youth career
- Lye Town

Senior career*
Years	Team	Apps	(Gls)
1971–1974	Walsall	79	(20)
1974–1976	Cambridge United	99	(25)
1976–1979	Wrexham	128	(37)
1979–1980	Manchester City	5	(0)
1980	→Millwall (loan)	5	(3)
1980–1982	Newcastle United	42	(10)
1982–1983	Millwall	34	(4)
1983–?	Worcester City	?	(?)
	Weymouth	?	(?)
	Malvern Town	?	(?)

Managerial career
- 1984: Worcester City
- * Club domestic league appearances and goals

Robert Thomas Shinton (born 6 January 1952, in West Bromwich) is an English former football forward and manager.

== Career ==
Shinton began his playing career with Walsall in 1971 before moving on to Cambridge United in 1974. He left the club in the 1975 close season to sign for Wrexham where he proved a hit, helping the club to a Football League Third Division title and a series of FA Cup giant-killing results. A £300,000 move to Manchester City in the 1979 close season proved unsuccessful and Shinton was loaned out to Millwall before completing a full-time move to Newcastle United. Although he featured more regularly at Newcastle than he had in Manchester Shinton's scoring boots deserted him as the club struggled for goals across the board. He left Newcastle in March 1982 to sign for Millwall again. He finished his league career with the Lions after having his contract cancelled by mutual consent.

Dropping out of the league, Shinton played non-league football with Worcester City and briefly managed the club in 1984. He finished his playing career with spells at Weymouth and Malvern Town. During the late 1990s he was involved in the management of Newmarket Town although he later left football to set up his own double glazing firm in Worcester.
