= Peter Godfrey (footballer, born 1938) =

English footballer

Personal information
- Full name: Peter Ronald Godfrey
- Date of birth: 15 March 1938 (age 88)
- Place of birth: Woolwich, England
- Position: Winger

Senior career*
Years	Team	Apps	(Gls)
1955–1961	Charlton Athletic	1	(0)
1961–1965	Gillingham	66	(9)
1965–1966	Chesterfield	27	(2)
1966–1967	Exeter City	42	(4)
Total		136	(15)
- * Club domestic league appearances and goals

Peter Ronald Godfrey (born 15 March 1938) is an English former professional footballer who played as a winger.

Born in Woolwich, he played for Charlton Athletic, Gillingham, Chesterfield and Exeter City between 1955 and 1967.
