= George Harris (footballer, born 1940) =

English footballer (1940–2022)

Personal information
- Date of birth: 10 June 1940
- Place of birth: Lambeth, London, England
- Date of death: 8 February 2022 (aged 81)
- Position: Winger

Senior career*
Years	Team	Apps	(Gls)
- Woking
–1962	Newport County	31	(8)
1962–1966	Watford	163	(55)
1966–1969	Reading	136	(56)
1969–?	Cambridge United		
1971	Wokingham		
- * Club domestic league appearances and goals

George Alfred Harris (10 June 1940 – 8 February 2022) was an English footballer who played as a winger in the Football League in the 1960s and early 1970s.

Harris was born on 10 June 1940. After starting with Woking he moved to Newport County and played 31 League games for them in the 1961–62 season, before moving to Watford. He played 163 League games for the Hornets and scored 55 goals.

In 1966 Harris moved to Reading, and he remained with the Berkshire club until 1969, gaining the player of the season award in 1966–67. In all he made 156 appearances for Reading, scoring 66 goals.

He left Reading to join Cambridge United and played for them in their first ever Football League season in 1970–71. On 15 August 1970, he appeared for Cambridge in their first ever Football League match against Lincoln City, and a fortnight later he scored his first Football League goal for Cambridge against Oldham Athletic. In total he made 35 Football League appearances for Cambridge, scoring on 11 occasions.

In February 2009, it was noted that Harris was still living in Reading. He died on 8 February 2022, at the age of 81.
