= Clifford Grossmark =

English doctor and association football administrator

Clifford Sydney Grossmark, MB, BS, MRCS, LRCP (27 December 1914 – 12 November 1983) was an English doctor and association football administrator, best known for his 22-year spell as chairman of Kent-based club Gillingham F.C.

== Medical career ==
Grossmark was born in the East End of London in 1914, but relocated with his family to Hendon at an early age. As a youth he was a keen footballer and a supporter of Queens Park Rangers. He studied at St Bartholomew's Hospital in the city, qualifying as a surgeon in 1938. He went into practice in Chatham, Kent, initially as a locum, but his career was quickly interrupted by the Second World War, during which he served with the Royal Air Force Volunteer Reserve and Desert Air Force and was an acting squadron leader in Ceylon. At the conclusion of the war he returned to Chatham.

== Football career ==
Soon after the war, Grossmark became a season-ticket holder at Priestfield Stadium, home of Gillingham F.C., then playing in the Southern League. In 1954, four years after the club had been elected back into The Football League, he became the club doctor, and three years later was asked to join the board of directors. In 1961 he became club chairman, a post he held for 22 years, making him at the time the longest-serving chairman in English football. In 1963 he joined the Football League's Third and Fourth Division Committee and became chairman of that body five years later. In 1975, he was elected to the League's Management Committee. He was widely known in football circles simply as "The Doctor".

== Death ==
Grossmark suffered a heart attack while travelling to watch Gillingham play an away game against Walsall on 12 November 1983, and died before he could be taken to hospital. At his funeral service, the eulogy was given by television football commentator Brian Moore, a fellow Gillingham director. Grossmark was survived by his son, Michael Frank, also a doctor.
