= Ivan Hollett =

English footballer (1940–2022)

Personal information
- Full name: Ivan Ronald Hollett
- Date of birth: 22 April 1940
- Place of birth: Pinxton, Derbyshire, England
- Date of death: 23 March 2022 (aged 81)
- Position: Striker

Youth career
- Derby County

Senior career*
Years	Team	Apps	(Gls)
195?–1958	Sutton Town		
1958–1964	Mansfield Town	98	(40)
1964–1968	Chesterfield	157	(62)
1968–1970	Crewe Alexandra	58	(19)
1970–1972	Cambridge United	38	(13)
1972–1973	Hereford United	11	(2)
Total		362	(137)
- * Club domestic league appearances and goals

Ivan Ronald Hollett (22 April 1940 – 23 March 2022) was an English footballer.

== Career ==
He played as a striker for five Football League clubs.

He then had a spell as player-coach at Durban United before taking on similar roles at several non-league clubs, including Alfreton Town where he scored 47 goals in 86 appearances, and whom he also guided to the 1976-77 Midland League championship.

Hollett later worked for Mansfield Town as a scout and was youth team coach at Field Mill. On 27 June 2009, it was announced that he would take up a role of watching youngsters out on loan and report back to manager David Holdsworth.

== Death ==
Hollett died on 23 March 2022, at the age of 81.
