= Nigel Cassidy =

English footballer (1945–2008)

Personal information
- Date of birth: 7 December 1945
- Place of birth: Sudbury, England
- Date of death: 19 May 2008 (aged 62)
- Position: Striker

Youth career
- 1961–1963: Norwich City

Senior career*
Years	Team	Apps	(Gls)
1963–1967	Lowestoft Town	94	(103)
1967–1968	Norwich City	3	(0)
1968–1970	Scunthorpe United	88	(35)
1970–1974	Oxford United	116	(33)
1974–1975	Cambridge United	43	(11)
1975	Denver Dynamos	20	(1)
1975	Cambridge United	11	(2)
- Bicester Town

Managerial career
- Bicester Town
- Banbury United
- * Club domestic league appearances and goals

Nigel Cassidy (7 December 1945 – 19 May 2008) was an English footballer.

== Career ==
Cassidy was born in Sudbury, Suffolk; his father Francis Arthur Michael Cassidy had played for Norwich City before World War II. Cassidy joined Norwich as a 15-year old, but was released two years later. He joined non-league side Lowestoft Town in the Eastern Counties League, also working at local firm Birds Eye. He initially played in Lowestoft's reserve team before moving up to the first team during the 1964–65 season and going on to score 103 goals in 91 games prior to rejoining Norwich in July 1967. He managed to make three league appearances for the team before making a move to Fourth Division side Scunthorpe United in December 1968. He made 88 appearances and scored 35 goals in the league for Scunthorpe before leaving for Oxford United in November 1970, making a return to the Second Division.

His stay at Oxford saw him make 116 league appearances, in which he scored 33 goals, until he joined Cambridge United in March 1974, who were relegated to the Fourth Division at the end of the 1973–74 season. He spent the summer of 1975 with Denver Dynamos in the North American Soccer League, where he made 20 appearances and scored one goal. He returned to Cambridge for the 1975–76 season after finishing his spell in America and finished his Cambridge career with 54 league appearances and 13 goals. He was forced to retire after an achilles tendon injury suffered in a match in 1975. He subsequently spent four years as player-manager at Bicester Town and then two years as manager of Banbury United, as well as running the Black Bull pub in Launton and the Shakespeare pub in Bicester, before moving to Wadebridge in Cornwall where he ran the Molesworth Arms for almost 20 years.

He died on 19 May 2008 after suffering from a short illness.
