= Rod Taylor (footballer) =

English footballer (1943–2018)

Personal information
- Full name: Rodney Victor Taylor
- Date of birth: 9 September 1943
- Place of birth: Corfe Mullen, England
- Date of death: 16 April 2018 (aged 74)
- Place of death: Poole, England
- Position: Wing half

Senior career*
Years	Team	Apps	(Gls)
1961–1963	Portsmouth	0	(0)
1963–1966	Gillingham	11	(0)
1966–1967	Bournemouth & Boscombe Athletic	30	(0)
1967–1971	Poole Town	128	
1971	Andover		
- * Club domestic league appearances and goals

Rodney Victor Taylor (9 September 1943 – 16 April 2018) was an English professional footballer of the 1960s. He played professionally for Portsmouth, Gillingham, and Bournemouth & Boscombe Athletic.

== Career ==
Taylor's career began at Portsmouth as a ground staff boy in 1958 and at the age of 17, he signed his first professional contract at Pompey, going on to play at Fratton Park for two seasons. He joined Gillingham in July 1963 and spent three years at Priestfield. In 1966, he returned to Dorset to play for Bournemouth & Boscombe Athletic under manager Freddie Cox, who had signed him at Gillingham. He made 30 appearances for the Cherries in the Fourth Division, before joining Poole Town in August 1967 followed by Andover in 1971.

== Career statistics ==
Appearances and goals by club, season and competition
Club	Season	League			National cup		League cup		Total	
Club	Season	Division	Apps	Goals	Apps	Goals	Apps	Goals	Apps	Goals
Gillingham	1963–64	Fourth Division	1	0	0	0	0	0	1	0
Gillingham	1964–65	Third Division	1	0	0	0	0	0	1	0
Gillingham	1965–66	Third Division	9	0	1	1	1	0	11	1
Gillingham	Total		11	0	1	1	1	0	13	1

== Later life and legacy ==
To support his family after his playing career, Taylor went into partnership with fellow former Portsmouth and Bournemouth player Tony Priscott in the building trade. He died in April 2018 and, after having his brain donated and examined by the neuropathologist Dr Willie Stewart in a similar way as Jeff Astle, it was proved that he was suffering from Dementia with Lewy bodies and CTE. In January 2021, Taylor's daughter, Rachel Walden, was invited to join Astle's daughter Dawn at the Professional Footballers' Association (PFA). Together, they embarked on a six-month project aimed at improving neurodegenerative care for former football players and their families. Their collaborative efforts resulted in the establishment of a dedicated Brain Health Department, which was officially launched in February 2022. This department designed to provide essential support and resources for individuals affected by neurological issues related to football. It also involved the recruitment of former professional footballers David Ryan and Alex Fletcher to deliver brain health education to current EFL and WSL players whilst promoting dementia awareness alongside notable figures like John Breckin and Tony Currie. In September 2023 the Premier League and PFA announced the launch of the Football Brain Health Fund.
