= Graham Rathbone =

Welsh footballer

Personal information
- Full name: Graham Rathbone
- Date of birth: 22 August 1942
- Place of birth: Newport, Wales
- Date of death: 8 January 2012 (aged 69)
- Place of death: Newport, Wales
- Position: Central defender

Youth career
- –1960: Merthyr Tydfil

Senior career*
Years	Team	Apps	(Gls)
1960–1966	Newport County	191	(7)
1966–1973	Grimsby Town	233	(11)
1973–1974	Cambridge United	36	(0)
1974–?	Kettering Town		
- * Club domestic league appearances and goals

Graham Rathbone (22 August 1942 – 8 January 2012) was a Welsh professional footballer.

Rathbone was born in Newport, Monmouthshire. A centre-half, he began his career with Merthyr Tydfil. In 1960, he joined Newport County and made 191 appearances for the club, scoring 7 goals. In 1966 manager Jimmy McGuigan signed him at Grimsby Town for a £10,000 fee where he made 233 appearances before moving to Cambridge United and Kettering Town.

Rathbone died from dementia in Newport on 8 January 2012, aged 69.

== Honours ==
=== Grimsby Town ===
Division Four: Champions 1971–72
