= John Meredith (footballer) =

English footballer (1940–2026)

Personal information
- Date of birth: 23 September 1940
- Place of birth: Hatfield, Doncaster, England
- Date of death: 3 January 2026 (aged 85)
- Position: Winger

Senior career*
Years	Team	Apps	(Gls)
1958–1961	Doncaster Rovers	58	(8)
1961–1962	Sheffield Wednesday	1	(0)
1962–1964	Chesterfield	81	(6)
1964–1969	Gillingham	228	(7)
1969–1971	Bournemouth & Boscombe Athletic	51	(1)
1971–?	Hastings United		

Managerial career
- 1971–?: Hastings United
- * Club domestic league appearances and goals

John Meredith (23 September 1940 – 3 January 2026) was an English professional footballer. A winger, he played for Doncaster Rovers, Sheffield Wednesday, Chesterfield, Gillingham and Bournemouth & Boscombe Athletic during a 13-year professional career. He died on 3 January 2026, at the age of 85.
