= Jon O'Donnell =

English footballer

Personal information
- Full name: Jonathan David O'Donnell
- Date of birth: 21 March 1954
- Place of birth: Leeds, England
- Date of death: April 1997 (aged 43)
- Position: Fullback

Youth career
- Leeds United

Senior career*
Years	Team	Apps	(Gls)
1971–1973	Leeds United	0	(0)
1973–1976	Cambridge United	79	(8)
1975	→ Colchester United (loan)	1	(0)
1976–1977	Hartlepool United	31	(1)
1977–1980	Scunthorpe United	60	(1)
1981–1984	Cambridge City	76+1	(2)
- * Club domestic league appearances and goals

Jonathan David O'Donnell (21 March 1954 – April 1997) born in Leeds, England, was an English professional footballer who played as a fullback in The Football League for Leeds United, Cambridge United, Colchester United, Hartlepool United and Scunthorpe United. He moved into non-league football to play for Cambridge City in season 1981–82. Left the club after the opening Southern League game in August 1984. O'Donnell died in April 1997.
