= Dennis Walker (footballer) =

English footballer (1944–2003)

Personal information
- Full name: Dennis Allen Walker
- Date of birth: 26 October 1944
- Place of birth: Northwich, England
- Date of death: 11 August 2003 (aged 58)
- Place of death: Stockport, England
- Positions: Right midfielder; forward

Senior career*
Years	Team	Apps	(Gls)
1961–1964	Manchester United	1	(0)
1964–1968	York City	154	(19)
1968–1972	Cambridge United	56	(4)
1972	Montreal Olympique	10	(0)
- * Club domestic league appearances and goals

Dennis Allen Walker (26 October 1944 – 11 August 2003) was an English footballer.

Walker was born in the town of Northwich, Cheshire. His mother, Mary Walker, of Queen Street Northwich. Dennis' father was an Afro-Iranian, although he described his heritage as Iranian/Argentinian. According to Mary, his father died at sea whilst Dennis was a baby. Despite this, he learned to speak Persian fluently, and corresponded and visited his father's family in Iran.

He was picked up by Manchester United at the age of 12, where Walker was part of the second generation of Busby Babes who were brought through the club after the Munich air disaster. He was on the verge of being selected for the England schoolboys under-15 team, which would have made Walker the first black player to represent England at any level, however he was not eligible as he had already signed professional terms with his club. He became a full-time professional in November 1961. Walker made his Manchester United debut against Nottingham Forest on 20 May 1963, the last game of the 1962–63 Football League First Division season, when Matt Busby elected to rest several first team players ahead of the 1963 FA Cup Final; Walker thus become United's first ever black player.

Although he remained at the club for a time afterward, including being selected for a pre-season tour of Italy ahead of the 1963–4 season, he was unable to displace the likes of George Best, Bobby Charlton and Denis Law from the first team. He was released by the club and he joined York City in April 1964. He made 169 appearances for York before joining Cambridge United, who he played for in both the Southern League and the Football League.

Walker was married four times: his best man at his first wedding, shortly after he had joined York City, was former Manchester United team-mate David Sadler. After retiring from football he became operations manager at the Manchester Arndale shopping centre. He was on duty at the time of the 1996 Manchester bombing, when he supported the decision to evacuate the building after receiving a warning about the planting of the bomb, despite hoax calls not being uncommon at the time. The bomb detonated shortly after the building had been cleared: Walker himself was flung across the road by the force of the blast and hit the window of a branch of Debenhams, although he was unhurt. He later suffered a stroke which left him paralysed on the right side of his body. He died at Stepping Hill Hospital in 2003 at the age of 58
