= Jimmy White (footballer, born 1942) =

English footballer

Personal information
- Full name: James White
- Date of birth: 13 June 1942
- Place of birth: Parkstone, England
- Date of death: 26 July 2017 (aged 75)
- Place of death: Cambridgeshire, England
- Position: Central defender

Senior career*
Years	Team	Apps	(Gls)
1957–1958	Bournemouth & Boscombe Athletic	1	(0)
1958–1963	Portsmouth	34	(6)
1963–1966	Gillingham	65	(1)
1966–1970	Bournemouth & Boscombe Athletic	175	(5)
1970–1972	Cambridge United	30	(2)
Total		305	(14)
- * Club domestic league appearances and goals

James White (13 June 1942 – 26 July 2017) was an English professional footballer who played for Bournemouth & Boscombe Athletic, Portsmouth, Gillingham and Cambridge United between 1958 and 1972.

He died at the age of 75 in 2017.
