= Alan Guild =

Scottish footballer

Personal information
- Full name: Alan Nicoll Guild
- Date of birth: 27 March 1947 (age 79)
- Place of birth: Forfar, Scotland
- Position: Central defender

Youth career
- Forfar West End

Senior career*
Years	Team	Apps	(Gls)
1965–1970	East Fife	96	(12)
1970–1971	Luton Town	1	(0)
1971–1974	Cambridge United	127	(1)
	Cambridge City	86	(6)
Total		310	(19)
- * Club domestic league appearances and goals

Alan Nicoll Guild (born 27 March 1947) is a Scottish footballer, who played for East Fife, Luton Town and Cambridge United. He later played minor counties cricket for Cambridgeshire in the summer of 1983, making two appearances.
