= Brian Greenhalgh =

English footballer

Personal information
- Full name: Brian Arthur Greenhalgh
- Date of birth: 20 February 1947 (age 79)
- Place of birth: Chesterfield, England
- Height: 5 ft 11 in (1.80 m)
- Position: Striker

Youth career
- –: Preston North End

Senior career*
Years	Team	Apps	(Gls)
1965–1968	Preston North End	19	(9)
1968–1969	Aston Villa	40	(12)
1969	Leicester City	4	(0)
1969–1971	Huddersfield Town	15	(0)
1971–1974	Cambridge United	116	(47)
1974–1975	AFC Bournemouth	24	(7)
1975	→ Torquay United (loan)	9	(1)
1975–1976	Watford	18	(1)
- * Club domestic league appearances and goals

Brian Arthur Greenhalgh (born 20 February 1947) is an English former professional footballer who played as a striker in the Football League for Preston North End, Aston Villa, Leicester City, Huddersfield Town, Cambridge United, AFC Bournemouth, Torquay United and Watford during the 1960s and 1970s.

Although retired Brian is currently a part-time scout for Newcastle United, and has scouted for Everton, Watford and Aston Villa. After leaving Watford he played non-league football for Dartford, Wealdstone and a number of other non-league clubs.
