= Colin Meldrum (footballer, born 1941) =

Scottish footballer and manager (1941–2019)

Personal information
- Date of birth: 26 November 1941
- Place of birth: Glasgow, Scotland
- Date of death: 4 October 2019 (aged 77)
- Position: Left back

Youth career
- Arsenal

Senior career*
| Years | Team | Apps | (Gls) |
| 1958–1960 | Arsenal | 0 | (0) |
| 1960–1962 | Watford | 32 | (0) |
| 1962–1970 | Reading | 266 | (8) |
| 1970–1971 | Cambridge United | 38 | (0) |
| 1971–1972 | Hillingdon Borough | | |
| 1974–1975 | Workington | 2 | (0) |
| Total | | 338 | (8) |

Managerial career
- 1971–1972: Hillingdon Borough
- 1974–1975: Workington
- 1975–1977: Stafford Rangers
- 1977: Workington
- 1987–1988: Workington
- * Club domestic league appearances and goals

Colin Meldrum (26 November 1941 – 4 October 2019) was a Scottish football player and manager.

== Career ==
Born in Glasgow, Meldrum played as a left back for Arsenal, Watford, Reading, Cambridge United, Hillingdon Borough and Workington. At Reading, he was Player of the Season in the 1963–64 and 1964–65 seasons.

Meldrum also worked as the player-manager of Hillingdon Borough and Workington, coach of York City, and manager of Stafford Rangers.

== Honours ==
Reading

- Player of the Season: 1964, 1965
