= Bill Cassidy (footballer, born 1940) =

Scottish footballer

Personal information
- Full name: William Pitt Cassidy
- Date of birth: 4 October 1940
- Place of birth: Hamilton, Scotland
- Date of death: 9 March 1995 (aged 54)
- Place of death: Oxford, England
- Height: 5 ft 9 in (1.75 m)
- Positions: Left half; inside forward

Senior career*
Years	Team	Apps	(Gls)
195?–1958	Burnbank Swifts		
1958	Hamilton Academical	1	(0)
1958	Coltness United		
1958–1961	Rangers	0	(0)
1961–1962	Rotherham United	25	(1)
1962–1967	Brighton & Hove Albion	118	(25)
1967–1968	Chelmsford City		
1968	Detroit Cougars	20	(3)
1968–1971	Cambridge United (Note: Cambridge United figures include Football League matches only.)	31	(6)
1971–1972	Kettering Town		
1972–197?	Ramsgate Athletic		
1975–1977	Brora Rangers		

Managerial career
- 1977–1979: Ross County
- * Club domestic league appearances and goals

William Pitt Cassidy (4 October 1940 – 9 March 1995) was a Scottish professional football player and manager. He made 174 English Football League appearances playing for Rotherham United, Brighton & Hove Albion and Cambridge United. He also played one Scottish League match as a trialist for Hamilton Academical, and spent the 1968 North American Soccer League season with the Detroit Cougars. He also played junior football for Burnbank Swifts and Coltness United and English non-league football for Chelmsford City, Kettering Town and Ramsgate Athletic. He went on to act as player-coach of Highland League club Brora Rangers and managed Ross County, also of the Highland League.

Cassidy was born in Hamilton, South Lanarkshire, in 1940 and died in Oxford in 1995 at the age of 54.
