= Graham Watson (footballer, born 1949) =

English footballer

Personal information
- Full name: Graham Sidney Watson
- Date of birth: 31 August 1949 (age 77)
- Place of birth: Doncaster, England
- Position: Midfielder

Senior career*
Years	Team	Apps	(Gls)
1966–1968	Doncaster Rovers	48	(11)
1968–1969	Rotherham United	13	(1)
1969–1972	Doncaster Rovers	109	(23)
1972–1978	Cambridge United	209	(24)
1978–1980	Lincoln City	43	(2)
1980	Cambridge United	1	(0)
- * Club domestic league appearances and goals

Graham Sidney "Willie" Watson (born 31 August 1949) is an English former footballer who played in the Football League for Cambridge United, Doncaster Rovers, Lincoln City, and Rotherham United.
