= John Collins (footballer, born 1942) =

English footballer (born 1942)

Personal information
- Full name: John William Bashley Collins
- Date of birth: 10 August 1942 (age 84)
- Place of birth: Chiswick, London, England
- Position: Inside left

Youth career
- 1950–1959: Queens Park Rangers

Senior career*
Years	Team	Apps	(Gls)
1959–1966	Queens Park Rangers	172	(46)
1966–1967	Oldham Athletic	39	(33)
1967–1969	Reading	85	(28)
1969–1971	Luton Town	42	(10)
1971–1973	Cambridge United	97	(16)
Total		435	(132)
- * Club domestic league appearances and goals

John William Bashley Collins (born 10 August 1942) is an English former footballer who scored 108 goals from 417 appearances in the Football League in the 1960s and early 1970s, playing as an inside left for Queens Park Rangers, Oldham Athletic, Reading, Luton Town and Cambridge United.

Collins came through the youth ranks at Queens Park Rangers, turned professional in 1959 and made his debut in a 1–0 win against Barnsley in April 1960. He went on to play 172 league games for Rangers, scoring 46 league goals, then transferred to Oldham Athletic in 1966 and later had spells at Reading, Luton Town and Cambridge United.

Collins became a cult hero at QPR after famously scoring a hat-trick of headers in a game versus Hull City. Collins also scored a fourth, although this was discounted by match official Cedric Tomlinson.

Ken Wagstaff of Hull later described the performance as: "A hatrick of headers - that's certainly something I'd never be able to do."
