= David Lill =

English footballer

Personal information
- Date of birth: 17 February 1947 (age 79)
- Place of birth: Aldbrough, England
- Position: Midfielder

Senior career*
Years	Team	Apps	(Gls)
1966–1969	Hull City	18	(2)
1969–1971	Rotherham United	39	(5)
1971–1976	Cambridge United	172	(22)
- * Club domestic league appearances and goals

David Lill (born 17 February 1947) is an English former footballer who played in the Football League for Cambridge United, Hull City and Rotherham United.
