= Peter Vasper =

English footballer (born 1945)

Personal information
- Full name: Peter John Vasper
- Date of birth: 3 September 1945 (age 81)
- Place of birth: Bromley, England
- Position: Goalkeeper

Senior career*
Years	Team	Apps	(Gls)
- Guildford City
1967–1970	Norwich City	31	(0)
1970–1974	Cambridge United	136	(0)
- Dartford
- * Club domestic league appearances and goals

Peter Vasper (born 3 September 1945) is an English former footballer who played in the Football League for Cambridge United and Norwich City.
