= Chris Foote (footballer) =

English footballer

Personal information
- Full name: Chris Foote
- Date of birth: 19 November 1950 (age 75)
- Place of birth: Bournemouth, England
- Position: Midfielder

Senior career*
Years	Team	Apps	(Gls)
1968–1970	Bournemouth	45	(2)
1970–1974	Cambridge United	86	(6)
- Weymouth
Total		131	(8)
- * Club domestic league appearances and goals

Chris Foote (born 19 November 1950) is an English former footballer who played in the Football League for Bournemouth and Cambridge United.
