= Workington A.F.C. =

Association football club in Workington, England

- Full name: Workington Association Football Club
- Nickname: The Reds
- Founded: 1921; 105 years ago
- Ground: Derwent Park, Fibrus Community stadium
- Capacity: 3,101 (500 seated)
- Manager: Billy Barr
- League: Northern Premier League Premier Division
- 2025–26: Northern Premier League Premier Division, 18th of 21
| Home colours | Away colours | Third colours |

Workington Association Football Club is an English football club based in Workington, Cumbria, England. The club competes in the Northern Premier League Premier Division, the seventh tier of English football.

The club plays its home matches at Borough Park, which has a capacity of 3,101. The club is often referred to as Workington Reds (red being its home colour) to distinguish it from Rugby League club Workington Town. Its traditional rivals are Carlisle United and Barrow.

== History ==
=== Long folk history ===
Football in Workington has a very long history. Close by and adjacent to the home of Workington A.F.C. the folk game of "Uppies and Downies" is still an annual event. There are records about the game from 20 April 1775 in the Cumbrian Pacquet which is one of the earliest written reports of a match anywhere in the world. This report says the match on which it is reporting is "long contended".

=== Formation of the club ===
Association football was introduced to Workington in the 1860s and further popularised when a group of steel workers migrated to the town from Dronfield, Derbyshire. They were workers of the Charles Cammel and Co steel works that arrived in the town in 1884. It is estimated that 1,500 townspeople moved to Workington. 'Dronnies', as the people of Workington called the newcomers, joined the 1883-founded Workington in 1888. This is also confirmed in a short history of the club which was produced as part of 16 page brochure in the club's application to the Football League in 1951.

The original Workington A.F.C. were one of the founder members of the Cumberland Association League in 1888 and played at the Ashfield Ground before moving to Lonsdale Park for the 1909–1910 season.

In 1894, they moved to the Cumberland Senior League, and in 1901, joined the Lancashire League. However, the league closed two seasons later, and they returned to the Cumberland Senior League. In 1904, the club were admitted to the Lancashire Combination, but in 1910, they decided to economise and join the North Eastern League. However, after only one season, the club folded.

The new Workington A.F.C. was born in 1921 and immediately joined the North Eastern League. During the 1933–34 season, the club managed its best-ever FA Cup performance, reaching the 4th round, before losing to Preston North End. Later, in 1937, the club moved to its present home, Borough Park, after being forced out of Lonsdale Park following a lease to a Scottish greyhound and speedway company.

In 1951, the club was voted into the Third Division North of the Football League, replacing New Brighton.

=== The Football League years (1951-1977) ===
The early Football League years of Workington Reds are chronicled in a series of books entitled So Sad So Very Sad – The League History of Workington AFC: part 1 (1951–58), part 2 (1958–64) and part 3 (1964–65).

The history of the club as a member of the Football League was one of almost constant struggle. Their first season in the League was a sign of things to come: the club finished rock bottom, and only improved by one place the following season.

From 6 January 1954 to 15 November 1955, the club was managed by Bill Shankly, who would later go on to achieve great fame through his success as manager of Liverpool.

During the 1957–58 season, they played the great Manchester United team known as the Busby Babes at home in the 3rd round of the FA Cup, attracting a record crowd of 21,000. This was just a month before eight of the United players lost their lives in the Munich air disaster. At the end of that season, the club dropped into the newly formed Fourth Division after a reorganisation of the Football League which saw the abolition of the two regionalised Third Divisions.

In 1964, player-manager Ken Furphy led them to 3rd position, earning promotion to the Third Division. During both the 1963–64 and 1964–65 season, they made it to the quarter-finals of the League Cup, where they lost to West Ham United and Chelsea (in a replay) respectively. During the latter cup run, the club beat neighbours Barrow 9–1, a record which remained until the mid-1980s. The club's proudest night was at Blackburn Rovers on 22 October 1964 in a Football League Cup 3rd round replay. A Workington team of seasoned professionals such as Keith Burkinshaw, Dave Carr, Ken Furphy and Kit Napier and a few youngsters, like John Ogilvie who went on to have a long career at the club that reached 430 appearances, beat the Blackburn team 5–1 at Ewood Park. The Blackburn team that night were full of internationals, such as Ronnie Clayton, Mike England, Newton, Byrom etc. This was reported in one newspaper as "Incredible Fantastic Workington rubbed Rovers elegant noses in the mud of Ewood Park to produce the finest result in their 80 year history"

On 3 April 1965, Workington gave a debut to one of the youngest players ever to play in the Football League, Tony Geidmintis, who was only 15 years 247 days old. Geidmintis went on to play 328 games for Workington.

The mid-1960s also saw Workington give a debut to one of the earliest black professional footballers in the Football League. This was Peter Foley, who played over 80 games for Workington as a forward and scored some 16 goals for the club, before moving on to Scunthorpe where he kept a young Kevin Keegan out of the team for a couple of years. Later, Foley became an ambassador for racial equality in football, being awarded an O.B.E. from the Queen for his work.

In 1966, Workington had their best ever season in the Football League, finishing 5th in the Third Division and narrowly missing out on promotion to the Second Division. However, the next year they finished bottom and were relegated back to the Fourth Division. Manager Ken Furphy had moved on to Watford, taking some of Workington's key players such as Dave Carr and Dixie Hale with him. This marked the start of Workington's painful downward spiral back to non-league status.

In the 1968–69 season, Workington gave a Football League debut to one of the game's legendary goalkeepers, John Burridge. Burridge, born locally, made his debut against Newport County on the last day of the 1968/69 season; in an inauspicious debut, one of his very first touches saw him punch the ball into his own net from a Newport corner.

In the late '60s and early '70s, Workington had "Johnny Martin on the wing", a statement that became the most popular chant for Workington supporters. A cult hero at the club, Martin was often dubbed the "poor man's George Best", but to older supporters with longer memories, his tricks were reminiscent of the Clown Prince of Football Len Shackleton. Martin would, for example, dribble past two or three opponents, then sit on the ball and ask who wanted it next. Martin played 224 league and cup games for Workington, scoring 33 goals. He joined the club in 1969 and was transferred to Southport in 1974.

In 1974 and 1975, the club finished second from bottom, and in 1976, they finished bottom, but at the end of each season they achieved just enough votes from fellow League clubs to retain their Football League status. However, in 1977, the club won only four games all season, and again finished bottom of the league, with home attendances falling well below the 1,000-mark. This poor run finally led to the club being voted out of the League in summer 1977, being replaced by Wimbledon. Workington were the penultimate team to fail the re-election process before it was scrapped in 1986 and replaced with automatic relegation to the conference National; Southport, who were voted out the season after Workington, were the last club to lose their Football League status this way.

The club's appearance record for the whole period that Workington played in the Football League was achieved by Bobby Brown. Born in Motherwell, Brown played for Polkemmet, Motherwell and Workington. Brown, who was selected for the Third Division North representative team while at Workington, made a total of 469 league and cup appearances for the club between 1956 and 1967.

Bobby Brown, Malcolm Newlands, Jimmy Fleming, Dennis Stokoe and Jack Bertolini were all recognised by the Football League and played in the Football League Third Division North vs. South Representative Games during the 1950s.

=== Modern non-League years ===
After relegation in 1977, the club dropped into the Northern Premier League (NPL), but failed to trouble the top teams.

On 10 February 1978, a special fundraising friendly game was organised at Borough Park which saw two of the world's greatest players gracing the Workington pitch. On that night, a Workington team, captained by Bobby Charlton took on Fort Lauderdale Strikers (a touring side from the USA), who had Gordon Banks keeping goal. The game was watched by a crowd of 6,127, who witnessed a fantastic 25-yard (23 m) strike by Charlton which was only matched by the quality of the save by Banks. The game ended 0-0.

1987-1988 Relegation

Further seasons in the Northern Premier League saw Workington never finishing higher than 7th, before they were relegated to the NPL First Division in 1988.

During the 1985–86 season, one of the world's football greats played for Workington. The club was in poor financial straits with debts of £300,000 but, on 9 April 1986, George Best played for the "Reds" in a fund-raising friendly match against a Lancashire Football League 11. The Oldham Athletic chairman, Ian Stott, put together a team managed by Joe Royle to play at Borough Park. Hence, a few weeks before Best's fortieth birthday, he captained the Workington team. Phil Neal led the opposition, which included players from Oldham Athletic, Carlisle United and Bolton Wanderers.

1997-1998 Relegation

Workington continued to struggle, eventually being relegated to the North West Counties League in 1998.

1998-99 North West Counties League Champions

The club managed to win the League at their first attempt, which was also their first ever championship. After a 2–0 defeat at Kidsgrove Athletic on 27 February 1999, manager Peter Hampton set the squad a challenge: win their last 14 games and they would win the league. Sure enough, after winning the next 13 games, Workington squared up to league leaders Mossley at Borough Park in front of a 2,281 spectators, a league record at the time (subsequently beaten by Bury F.C. post their expulsion from the league). Workington ran out 2–1 winners, with goals from Stuart Williamson and substitute Grant Holt. Workington became the first club to return to the NPL First Division at the first attempt.

2003-2004 Northern Premier League Restructuring

As a result of a seventh-place finish in 2004, the club moved up to the NPL's Premier Division during the non-league restructuring.

2004-2005 Promotion to Conference North

They then continued their upward movement by winning the first-ever NPL promotion play-offs, after finishing in second place, to gain promotion to the Conference North.

2006-2007 Promotion Play Off Disappointment

Following a mid-table finish in their first season in Conference North, the 2006–07 season saw Workington finish in third place and qualify for the promotion play-offs where they lost 2–1 against Hinckley United.

2009-2010 Promotion Play Off Disappointment

After two mid-table finishes the following seasons, Workington made the playoffs again, this time going down 4–1 on aggregate to Alfreton Town in the semi-final.

2013-2014 Relegation to Northern Premier League

The club's longest-serving manager, Darren Edmondson, left the club in December 2013 to take over at Barrow. Former player Ian McDonald became manager prior to Christmas. He was unable to save the club from relegation as Workington finished 22nd in Conference North.

Ian McDonald resigned as manager at the end of the 2013–14 season. Gavin Skelton was appointed as his replacement in May 2014. Derek Townsley joined the club as Skelton's assistant.

2014-2015 Promotion Play Off Disappointment

Skelton led the Borough Park side to the Northern Premier League Play-offs in his first full season in charge, finally falling to Ilkeston Town in front of 1,391 supporters at Borough Park. Skelton left Workington in June 2015 to take a coaching role with the Dumfries club Queen of the South. Derek Townsley was appointed as his replacement a couple of weeks later. Average attendance for home games rose to 605 with the game against league champions F.C. United of Manchester attracting 2,603.

2015-2016 Promotion Play Off Disappointment

Workington qualified for their second successive Northern Premier League Play-off beating Blyth Spartans 4–3 in the semi-final before going down 2–3 in the final against Salford City

2016-2017 Promotion Play Off Disappointment

On 19 April 2017, having beaten Ilkeston 2–0, Workington qualified for their third successive Northern Premier League playoff losing 2–3 in the semi-final against Stourbridge after extra time.

2017–2018

After a slow start to the season, the side went on a 17-match unbeaten run to sit 2nd in the Northern Premier League table at the turn of the year. Unfortunately with a long injury list to the small squad the team slipped down the table in the new year to eventually finish 12th. The team also had an excellent run in the FA Trophy reaching the last 16 after knocking out higher league opposition in the form of Hartlepool United of the National League and Weston-super-Mare of the National League South before being beaten by eventual finalists Bromley in a replay.

2018-2019 Relegation to NPL North

A poor season of results saw Reds finish bottom of the Northern Premier League and they were relegated to the NPL West Division. Danny Grainger was appointed manager at the end of the 2018–19 season, following his retirement from playing at Carlisle United. His assistant is Steven Rudd.

2019-2020 and 2020-2021 The COVID years

The Reds demonstrated a determined effort to get promoted back into the Northern Premier League. However the impact of the COVID-19 pandemic ruled out the match results in both of these two seasons.

When the 2019–20 season was halted early in mid March 2020, Reds were 10 points clear at the top of the league having completed 31 of their 38 games that season. They had won their last eight games and Scott Allison was the league top scorer with 22 goals at that point.

The next season was also halted early, this time in January 2021. At this point, the Reds were second in the league, but only nine games had been completed.

2021-2022 Promotion Play Off Disappointment

By the last match of this season, the Reds were in second place, behind Warrington Rylands and the Reds final game was away to already relegated Market Drayton Town FC. A 1–1 draw with Market Drayton saw the Reds finish one point behind Rylands who also drew their final game. Another trip to the playoffs followed, with Reds losing 2–3 to Marine AFC who eventually won the playoffs and were promoted. Manager Chris Willcock left at the end of the season and was replaced was Danny Grainger who commenced his second managerial spell with the club.

2022-2023 Promotion back to Northern Premier League

The reds lost many players before the season started and August 2023 saw some disjointed performances. At the end of the month, the reds had four points from five games and occupied one of the relegation places. The team eventually gelled with the help of a couple of new signings and they eventually finished the season in third place. In the playoffs, the reds first beat Clitheroe FC 2–0, and then in the final, beat Runcorn Linnets 2–1 to gain promotion back into the Northern Premier League. The reds wrapped up a successful season by winning the Cumberland County Cup in style, beating Penrith 9–1 in the final.

== Record appearances for the club ==
Defender Kyle May is the current record holder with 544 appearances during his 13 seasons at Workington up to 2018. Next is defender Bobby Brown with 469 appearances, during the period Workington were in the football league. The only other player to have passed the 400 appearance mark is defender John Ogilvie with 431 again in the football league years. Long serving goalkeeper Mike Rogan fell just short with 390 appearances.

== Current first team squad ==
As of 19 August 2026

Note: Flags indicate national team as defined under FIFA eligibility rules; some limited exceptions apply. Players may hold more than one non-FIFA nationality.

| No. | Pos. | Nation | Player |
|---|---|---|---|
| — | GK | ENG | Danny Eccles |
| — | GK | ENG | Alex Mitchell |
| — | DF | ENG | Charlie Barnes |
| — | DF | ENG | Jack Dickinson |
| — | DF | ENG | Matty Douglas |
| — | DF | ENG | Keelan Leslie |
| — | MF | ENG | Jake Allan |
| — | MF | ENG | Brad Carroll |
| — | MF | ENG | Cieran Casson |
| — | MF | ENG | Luke Ellis |

| No. | Pos. | Nation | Player |
|---|---|---|---|
| — | MF | ENG | Dan Hopper |
| — | MF | ENG | Kai Nugent |
| — | MF | ENG | Simon Rigby |
| — | MF | ENG | Tom Stephenson |
| — | MF | ENG | Ted Thomson |
| — | MF | ENG | Isaac Whitehall |
| — | FW | ENG | Brennan Dickenson |
| — | FW | ENG | Luke Hunter |
| — | FW | ENG | Alfie McDonough |
| — | FW | ENG | Josh Palmer |

== Notable former players ==
The following players won full senior international caps:

- (Saint Kitts and Nevis) Matthew Berkeley (F) (1 full cap)
- (Saint Kitts and Nevis) Michael Crawford (M) (16 full caps, 2 goals)
- (Wales) Nick Deacy (F) (12 full caps, 4 goals)
- (England) Edwin Holliday (M) (3 full caps)
- (South Africa) George Miller (M) (3 full caps, 2 goals)
- (South Africa) Ted Purdon (F) (2 full caps, 1 goal)
- (England) Paul Stewart (M) (3 full caps)
- (Australia) Max Tolson (F) (19 full caps, 4 goals)
- (New Zealand) Adrian Webster (M) (5 full caps)
- (Hong Kong) Charlie Wright (GK) (5 full caps)
- (Wales) Will Vaulks (M) (7 full caps)
- (Nigeria) Efe Ambrose (D) (51 full caps, 4 goals)
- (Montserrat) Jamie Allen (F) (14 full caps)

== Former managers ==
Listed in order from 1950 to present:

- Bert Flatley – August 1950 to June 1952
- Ted Smith – June 1952 to September 1953
- Bill Shankly – January 1954 to December 1955
- Norman Low – January 1956 to February 1957
- Tommy Jones – February 1957 to June 1957
- Joe Harvey – June 1957 to June 1962
- Ken Furphy – July 1962 to November 1964
- Keith Burkinshaw – November 1964 to March 1965
- George Aitken – March 1965 to June 1965
- George Ainsley – June 1965 to November 1966
- Bill Leivers – November 1966 to February 1967
- Bobby Brown – March 1967 to December 1967
- Frank Upton – December 1967 to July 1968
- Brian Doyle – July 1968 to March 1971
- George Aitken – June 1971 to October 1974
- Brian Wood – October 1974 to November 1974
- Colin Meldrum – November 1974 to April 1975
- John Waugh – April 1975 to June 1975
- John McNamee – June 1975 to December 1975
- Alan Ashman – December 1975 to February 1977
- Colin Meldrum – February 1977 to May 1977
- Gordon Livsey – July 1977 to December 1977
- David Wilson – December 1977 to May 1978
- Bobby Johnstone – June 1978 to October 1978
- Peter Foley – October 1978 to January 1979
- Paul Sharp (Player/Manager) – January 1979
- Barry Endean – January 1979 to April 1980
- Sean Gallagher – May 1980 to October 1981
- Joe Wojciechowicz – October 1981 to July 1984
- Mick Taylor – July 1984 to July 1985
- Wayne Harrison – July 1985 to November 1986
- Ian Hodgson – November 1986 to October 1987

- Alan Oliver – October 1987 ~
- Colin Meldrum – October 1987 to February 1988
- Ian Hall – February 1988 to November 1988
- Jimmy Irving – November 1988 ~
- Mick Heaton – November 1988 – October 1989
- John Walsh – October 1989 ~
- Les O'Neill – October 1989 – July 1991
- Martin Harris – August 1991 – January 1992
- Jackie Hather – February 1992 ~
- George Norrie – February 1992 – November 1992
- Alan Cook – November 1992 – November 1994
- Stewart Sherwood – December 1994 ~
- Wayne Harrison – January 1995 – February 1997
- Keith Hunton – February 1997 – September 1997
- Tony Clinton – September 1997 – January 1998
- Jackie Cunningham – January 1998 – March 1998 ~
- "Committee Control" – March 1998 – April 1998
- Peter Hampton – May 1998 – October 2001
- Keith Mason – October 2001 ~
- Tommy Cassidy – October 2001 – September 2007
- Darren Edmondson – September 2007 – December 2013
- Ian MaDonald – December 2013 – April 2014
- Gavin Skelton – May 2014 – May 2015
- Derek Townsley – May 2015 – June 2016
- Dave Hewson & Lee Andrews – May 2016 – 31 December 2018 †
- Gavin Skelton – 31 December 2018 – 6 January 2019
- Lee Andrews – 7 January 2019 – May 2019
- Danny Grainger – June 2019 – 23/07/21
- Chris Willcock – 23 July 2021 - 3 May 2022
- Danny Grainger – 7 May 2022 - 7 May 2024
- Mark Fell – 7 May 2024 - 15 April 2025

~ Denotes Acting Manager † Denotes Joint Manager

== Honours list ==
The details of Workington A.F.C.'s performance year by year between 1921 and 2005 is detailed in Tom Allen's book Reds Remembered – The Definitive Workington A.F.C.

Workington's honours
| Competition | | Position | Season |
|---|---|---|---|
| Northern Counties M. Nicol Cup | | 2nd round | 1926 |
| North Eastern League | North Eastern League | Runners-up | 1939 |
| North Eastern League | Challenge Cup | Winners | 1935, 1937 |
| North Eastern League | Challenge Cup | Runners-up | 1938 |
| North West Counties League | Division One | Winners | 1998–99 |
| Northern Premier League | Premier Division | Runners-up | 2014–15 |
| Northern Premier League | Premier Division | Playoff winners | 2004–05 |
| Northern Premier League | Division One West | Runners-up | 2021–22 |
| Northern Premier League | Division One West | Playoff winners | 2022–23 |
| Northern Premier League | President's Cup | Winners | 1984 |
| Northern Premier League | President's Cup | Runners-up | 2004 |
| Northern Premier League | Fair Play Award | | 2000-01 |
| Cumberland County Cup | | Winners | 1887, 1888, 1889, 1890, 1891, 1896, 1897, 1898, 1899, 1907, 1908, 1910, 1925, 1935, 1937, 1938, 1950, 1954, 1968, 1986, 1996, 2000, 2007, 2009, 2016, 2017, 2023, 2024 |
| Cumberland County Cup | | Runners-up | 1886, 1892, 1900, 1901, 1903, 1909, 1924, 1927, 1930, 1947, 1969, 1979 |
