= Terry Eades =

Northern Irish footballer (1944–2021)

Personal information
- Full name: Terry Gerald Eades
- Date of birth: 5 March 1944
- Place of birth: Banbridge, Northern Ireland
- Date of death: 4 October 2021 (aged 77)
- Place of death: Great Shelford, England
- Position: Defender

Youth career
- Harway Minors
- Chelmsford City

Senior career*
Years	Team	Apps	(Gls)
1963–1969	Chelmsford City		
1969–1977	Cambridge United		
1976–1977	→ Watford (loan)	4	(0)
1977	Chelmsford City		
1978–1979	Histon		

Managerial career
- 1979–1981: Histon
- * Club domestic league appearances and goals

Terry Gerald Eades (5 March 1944 – 4 October 2021) was a Northern Irish professional footballer who played in Football League for Cambridge United and Watford.

== Career ==
Moving to Essex from Northern Ireland as a child, Eades initially played for local youth side Harway Minors, before being spotted by Chelmsford City. Eades initially played for the club's reserves, making his debut for the reserves on 18 April 1971 against Eynesbury Rovers. In total, Eades made 72 appearances for Chelmsford's reserves, scoring once. Eades made his debut in senior football for Chelmsford on 20 March 1963, playing in a 3–1 loss against Guildford City after graduating from the club's academy. During Eades' time at Chelmsford, he made 363 appearances, scoring six times.

In 1969, after helping Chelmsford to the 1968 Southern League title, Eades signed for Cambridge United for a fee of £2,500. On 31 March 1969, Eades scored on his league debut for Cambridge in a 2–0 win against Bedford Town. Eades was part of the Cambridge side that won two successive Southern League titles, helping the club gain election to the Football League in 1970. In 1976, after captaining Cambridge, Eades moved out on loan to Watford for a short period. Eades returned to Chelmsford City for a short spell in 1977.

In 1978, Eades signed for Histon, later managing the club. In April 1980, Eades was given a testimonial by Cambridge, with Ron Atkinson's West Bromwich Albion providing the opposition. In 1981, Eades resigned from his post as Histon manager.

Eades died on 4 October 2021 from cancer at the Arthur Rank Hospice, at the age of 77.
