= 1970–71 Colchester United F.C. season =

Colchester United
1970–71 season
- Chairman: Bill Graver (until March); Roy Chapman (from March)
- Manager: Dick Graham
- Stadium: Layer Road
- Fourth Division: 6th
- FA Cup: 6th round (eliminated by Everton)
- League Cup: 2nd round (eliminated by Birmingham City)
- Top goalscorer: League: Ray Crawford (24); All: Ray Crawford (31)
- Highest home attendance: 16,000 v Leeds United, 13 February 1971
- Lowest home attendance: 3,502 v Barrow, 26 April 1971
- Average home league attendance: 6,362
- Biggest win: 5–0 v Cambridge United, 19 August 1970 v Rochdale, 25 January 1971
- Biggest defeat: 0–5 v Everton, 6 March 1971
Home colours

The 1970–71 season was Colchester United's 29th season in their history and their third successive season in the fourth tier of English football, the Fourth Division. Alongside competing in the Fourth Division, the club also participated in the FA Cup and the League Cup.

Colchester reached the FA Cup quarter-final, famously beating First Division Leeds United 3–2 at Layer Road in the fifth round. They had already defeated Ringmer, Cambridge United, Barnet and Rochdale along the way, before being defeated 5–0 by Everton at Goodison Park. Owing to their cup run, Colchester's league form stuttered, ending the campaign in sixth place, while they suffered a second round exit in the League Cup after being beaten by Birmingham City following a replay.

== Season overview ==
During the summer of 1970, manager Dick Graham increased the average age of his Colchester squad by signing a number of ageing players, including ex-England international Ray Crawford, Brian Garvey, John Kurila, Mick Mahon and Brian Owen. During the season, both Owen and Roy Massey suffered serious or career ending injuries, forcing Graham into signing Brian Lewis and Dave Simmons.

The 1970–71 season is most notable for Colchester's famous FA Cup run. In the first round, the U's disposed of non-League Ringmer courtesy of a Ray Crawford hat-trick. They then completed a cup double over Cambridge United, beating them 5–0 in the first round of the League Cup and then 3–0 in the second round of the FA Cup. Colchester defeated further non-League opposition in the third round, winning against Barnet at Underhill Stadium. The U's trailed 3–1 with five minutes remaining of their fourth round tie with Rochdale before staging a late comeback to earn a 3–3 draw and a Layer Road replay, where they thrashed Rochdale 5–0. This earned them a home tie against First Division side Leeds United, a side top of the League and who boasted ten internationals in their side.

Leeds United were at the time one of the best teams in the country. However, Dick Graham's side set out to frustrate Leeds by suppressing their usual wing play and playing direct football instead. Chairs and other obstacles were placed by the sidelines to produce an illusion of a narrow playing surface. Colchester found themselves 3–0 ahead after two goals from Ray Crawford and one from Dave Simmons. However, Leeds began to fight back, pulling back two goals with 17-minutes remaining, before Colchester goalkeeper Graham Smith produced a phenomenal save to deny Mick Jones with the score at 3–2. Colchester held on to record a famous victory and one of the most notable FA Cup giant-killings.

With the U's in the quarter-finals, they were drawn against Everton at Goodison Park. Dick Graham's Grandad's Army finally succumbed to defeated by a 5–0 scoreline in front of a crowd of 53,028.

Colchester's cup run had a negative impact on their league form. With fixtures backing up, a run of 17 league games following their cup exit until the end of the season proved too much as they finished the campaign in sixth position, two points shy of promotion.

== Players ==
As of match played 7 May 1971.

Name	Position	Nationality	Place of birth	Date of birth	Apps	Goals	Signed from	Date signed	Fee
Goalkeepers
Brian Sherratt	GK	(England)	Stoke-on-Trent	29 March 1944 (aged 26)	0	0	(England) Gainsborough Trinity	August 1970	Free transfer
Graham Smith	GK	(England)	Liverpool	2 November 1947 (aged 22)	46	0	(England) Notts County	Summer 1969	Free transfer
Defenders
Eric Burgess	FB	(England)	Edgware	27 October 1944 (aged 25)	0	0	(England) Plymouth Argyle	December 1970	Free transfer
Micky Cook	FB	(England)	Enfield	9 April 1951 (aged 19)	21	0	(England) Orient	1 March 1969	Free transfer
Bobby Cram	FB	(England)	Hetton-le-Hole	19 November 1939 (aged 30)	21	0	(Canada) Vancouver Royals	17 January 1970 (Note: Date of signing refers to the date of the player's first game for the club)	Free transfer
Alan Dennis	CB	(England)	Colchester	22 February 1951 (aged 19)	3	0	Apprentice	April 1967	Free transfer
Brian Garvey	CB	(England)	Kingston upon Hull	3 July 1937 (aged 32)	0	0	(England) Watford	June 1970	Free transfer
John Gilchrist	FB	(Scotland)	Wishaw	5 September 1939 (aged 30)	0	0	(England) Fulham	15 August 1970	Free transfer
Brian Hall	LB	(England)	Burbage	9 March 1939 (aged 31)	253	26	(England) Mansfield Town	March 1965	Free transfer
Bobby Howlett	CB	(England)	West Ham	12 December 1948 (aged 21)	18	0	(England) Southend United	Summer 1968	Free transfer
John Kurila	CB	(Scotland)	Glasgow	10 April 1941 (aged 29)	0	0	(England) Southend United	Summer 1970	Free transfer
Trevor Painter	CB	(England)	Norwich	2 July 1949 (aged 20)	0	0	(England) Norwich City	30 April 1970	Free transfer
Lindsay Smith	CB	(England)	Enfield	18 September 1954 (aged 15)	0	0	Apprentice	20 April 1971	Free transfer
Adrian Webster	DF	(England)	Colchester	6 November 1951 (aged 18)	0	0	Apprentice	July 1968	Free transfer
Midfielders
Phil Bloss	MF	(England)	Colchester	16 January 1953 (aged 17)	0	0	Apprentice	January 1971	Free transfer
Steve Foley	MF	(England)	Clacton-on-Sea	21 June 1953 (aged 16)	0	0	Apprentice	July 1969	Free transfer
Ken Jones	MF	(England)	Keighley	9 February 1941 (aged 29)	28	16	(England) Millwall	November 1969	£5,000
Steve Leslie	MF	(England)	Hornsey	4 September 1952 (aged 17)	0	0	Apprentice	20 April 1971	Free transfer
Brian Lewis	MF	(England)	Woking	26 January 1943 (aged 27)	0	0	(England) Oxford United	26 December 1970	£5,000
Forwards
Micky Brown	WG	(England)	Farnham Common	11 April 1944 (aged 26)	58	12	(England) Luton Town	26 October 1968	£3,000
Ray Crawford	FW	(England)	Portsmouth	13 July 1936 (aged 33)	0	0	(England) Kettering Town	15 August 1970	£3,000
Brian Gibbs	FW	(England)	Gillingham	6 October 1936 (aged 33)	83	25	(England) Gillingham	September 1968	£8,000
Mick Mahon	WG	(England)	Manchester	17 September 1944 (aged 25)	0	0	(England) York City	May 1970	Free transfer
Brian Owen	WG	(England)	Harefield	1 November 1944 (aged 25)	0	0	(England) Watford	May 1970	Free transfer
Dave Simmons	FW	(England)	Ryde	24 October 1948 (aged 21)	0	0	(England) Aston Villa	26 December 1970	£6,000
Ray Whittaker	WG	(England)	Bow	15 January 1945 (aged 25)	41	7	(England) Luton Town	9 August 1969	Free transfer

== Transfers ==
=== In ===
Date	Position	Nationality	Name	From	Fee	Ref.
Summer 1970	CB	(Scotland)	John Kurila	(England) Southend United	Free transfer	
30 April 1970	CB	(England)	Trevor Painter	(England) Norwich City	Free transfer	
May 1970	WG	(England)	Brian Owen	(England) Watford	Free transfer	
May 1970	WG	(England)	Mick Mahon	(England) York City	Free transfer	
June 1970	CB	(England)	Brian Garvey	(England) Watford	Free transfer	
August 1970	GK	(England)	Brian Sherratt	(England) Gainsborough Trinity	Free transfer	
15 August 1970	FB	(Scotland)	John Gilchrist	(England) Fulham	Free transfer	(Note: Date of signing refers to the date of the player's first game for the club)
15 August 1970	FW	(England)	Ray Crawford	(England) Kettering Town	£3,000	
December 1970	FB	(England)	Eric Burgess	(England) Plymouth Argyle	Free transfer	
26 December 1970	FW	(England)	Dave Simmons	(England) Aston Villa	£6,000	
26 December 1970	MF	(England)	Brian Lewis	(England) Oxford United	£5,000	
January 1971	MF	(England)	Phil Bloss	Apprentice	Free transfer	
20 April 1971	CB	(England)	Lindsay Smith	Apprentice	Free transfer	
20 April 1971	MF	(England)	Steve Leslie	Apprentice	Free transfer	

- Total spending: ▼ ~ £14,000

=== Out ===
Date	Position	Nationality	Name	To	Fee	Ref.
End of season	FB	(England)	Bert Howe	(England) Romford	Free transfer	
End of season	CB	(England)	Brian Wood	(England) Workington	Released	
Summer 1970	GK	(England)	Ron Willis	(South Africa) Arcadia Shepherds	Free transfer	
28 April 1970	WG	(England)	Terry Dyson	(England) Guildford City	Free transfer	(Note: Date of departure refers to the date of the player's final game for the club)
28 April 1970	FW	(England)	Danny Light	(England) Guildford City	Released	
May 1970	CB	(England)	Dave Bickles	(England) Romford	Free transfer	
September 1970	FW	(Scotland)	Jim Oliver	(England) King's Lynn	Free transfer	
October 1970	MF	(England)	Roger Joslyn	(England) Aldershot	£8,000	
March 1971	FW	(England)	Roy Massey	Free agent	Retired	

- Total incoming: ▲ ~ £8,000

=== Loans out ===
Date	Position	Nationality	Name	To	End date	Ref.
April 1971	WG	(England)	Micky Brown	(England) Romford	End of season	

== Match details ==
=== Fourth Division ===
==== Results round by round ====
Round	1	2	3	4	5	6	7	8	9	10	11	12	13	14	15	16	17	18	19	20	21	22	23	24	25	26	27	28	29	30	31	32	33	34	35	36	37	38	39	40	41	42	43	44	45	46
Ground	H	A	H	A	A	H	A	A	H	A	A	H	A	H	A	H	A	A	H	H	A	H	A	H	A	H	H	H	A	H	A	A	H	H	H	A	A	H	H	A	A	A	H	H	A	H
Result	W	L	D	W	L	L	L	D	W	D	W	L	W	W	D	W	D	W	D	W	L	L	W	W	D	W	W	W	W	W	D	L	D	W	W	L	L	W	D	L	L	L	D	W	W	D
Position	4	12	15	7	12	15	17	18	14	15	14	15	14	12	12	8	10	8	6	6	8	9	9	7	7	7	8	6	5	6	5	7	7	7	7	7	7	7	7	7	7	7	7	6	6	6

Source: 11v11.com
A = Away; H = Home; W = Win; D = Draw; L = Loss

==== League table ====
Pos	Team	Pld	W	D	L	GF	GA	GAv	Pts	Promotion or relegation
4	York City (P)	46	23	10	13	78	54	1.444	56	Promotion to the Third Division
5	Chester	46	24	7	15	69	55	1.255	55	
6	Colchester United	46	21	12	13	70	54	1.296	54	Qualified for the Watney Cup (Note: The two teams who scored the most goals in each division, and did not qualify for Europe and were not promoted, qualified for the Watney Cup.)
7	Northampton Town	46	19	13	14	63	59	1.068	51	
8	Southport	46	21	6	19	63	57	1.105	48	

Source: rsssf.com
(P) Promoted

==== Matches ====
15 August 1970 1	Colchester United	1–0	Hartlepool	Colchester
	Brian Gibbs 35'	Report; Report		Stadium: Layer Road; Attendance: 4,866; Referee: D Civil

22 August 1970 2	Chester	2–1	Colchester United	Chester
	Draper 30'; Cheetham 38'	Report	Owen 15'	Stadium: Sealand Road; Attendance: 5,447; Referee: T Farley

29 August 1970 3	Colchester United	1–1	Northampton Town	Colchester
	Owen 3'	Report	East 43'	Stadium: Layer Road; Attendance: 5,220; Referee: H Hackney

31 August 1970 4	Barrow	0–2	Colchester United	Barrow-in-Furness
		Report	Gibbs 77'; Crawford 87'	Stadium: Holker Street; Attendance: 2,422; Referee: P Baldwin

4 September 1970 5	Southport	2–1	Colchester United	Southport
	Field 15' (pen.); Redrobe 21'	Report; Report	Gibbs 88'	Stadium: Haig Avenue; Attendance: 3,792; Referee: Jim Finney

12 September 1970 6	Colchester United	2–3	Notts County	Colchester
	Gibbs 40'; Crawford 89'	Report	Stubbs 25'; Barker 27'; Bradd 79'	Stadium: Layer Road; Attendance: 4,285; Referee: R Toseland

18 September 1970 7	Bournemouth & Boscombe Athletic	4–1	Colchester United	Bournemouth
	MacDougall 26', 61', 72', 81'	Report	Crawford 47'	Stadium: Dean Court; Attendance: 7,769; Referee: R Crabb

21 September 1970 8	Darlington	0–0	Colchester United	Darlington
		Report		Stadium: Feethams; Attendance: 4,042; Referee: W Johnson

25 September 1970 9	Colchester United	3–0	Crewe Alexandra	Colchester
	Crawford 41', 81', 90'	Report		Stadium: Layer Road; Attendance: 5,012; Referee: Ron Challis

30 September 1970 10	Workington	1–1	Colchester United	Workington
	Wookey 36'	Report	Gibbs 75'	Stadium: Borough Park; Attendance: 2,350; Referee: E Garner

3 October 1970 11	Peterborough United	1–2	Colchester United	Peterborough
	Robson 40'	Report; Report	Gibbs 18'; Massey 88'	Stadium: London Road Stadium; Attendance: 5,935; Referee: H Robinson

9 October 1970 12	Colchester United	1–2	Oldham Athletic	Colchester
	Crawford 51'	Report	Bebbington 50'; Mundy 55'	Stadium: Layer Road; Attendance: 5,423; Referee: T Spencer

17 October 1970 13	Hartlepool	1–2	Colchester United	Hartlepool
	Sharkey 43'	Report; Report	Mahon 58'; Gibbs 85'	Stadium: Victoria Park; Attendance: 2,913

19 October 1970 14	Colchester United	1–0	York City	Colchester
	Crawford 50'	Report		Stadium: Layer Road; Attendance: 4,457; Referee: A Hart

23 October 1970 15	Stockport County	0–0	Colchester United	Stockport
		Report		Stadium: Edgeley Road; Attendance: 5,113; Referee: Don Mapp

30 October 1970 16	Colchester United	5–2	Aldershot	Colchester
	Brodie 13' (o.g.); Crawford 28'; Hall 54'; Jones 75', 79'	Report	Walton 44'; Howarth 46'	Stadium: Layer Road; Attendance: 5,848; Referee: G Lewis

7 November 1970 17	Exeter City	2–2	Colchester United	Exeter
	Gadston 22'; Banks 80'	Report	Jones 36'; Massey 50'	Stadium: St James Park; Attendance: 4,420; Referee: H Powell

10 November 1970 18	Newport County	1–3	Colchester United	Newport
	Jones 29'	Report	Jones 28'; Massey 35', 55'	Stadium: Somerton Park; Attendance: 1,973; Referee: R Fennerty

13 November 1970 19	Colchester United	1–1	Southend United	Colchester
	Crawford 36'	Report; Report	Moore 41'	Stadium: Layer Road; Attendance: 7,777; Referee: K Burns

28 November 1970 20	Colchester United	4–0	Brentford	Colchester
	Gibbs 10'; Cram 14'; Crawford 49', 87'	Report		Stadium: Layer Road; Attendance: 4,673; Referee: R Sheppard

5 December 1970 21	Cambridge United	2–1	Colchester United	Cambridge
	Harris 13'; Horrey 80'	Report	Crawford 16'	Stadium: Abbey Stadium; Attendance: 5,183; Referee: R Bowling

18 December 1970 22	Colchester United	0–1	Chester	Colchester
		Report	Draper 6'	Stadium: Layer Road; Attendance: 4,342; Referee: Malcolm Sinclair

26 December 1970 23	Lincoln City	1–2	Colchester United	Lincoln
	Svarc 66'	Report	Lewis 30'; Simmons 58'	Stadium: Sincil Bank; Attendance: 5,919; Referee: K Baker

8 January 1971 24	Colchester United	2–1	Workington	Colchester
	Cram 63'; Crawford 71'	Report	Geidmintis 27'	Stadium: Layer Road; Attendance: 5,239; Referee: J Flye

16 January 1971 25	York City	1–1	Colchester United	York
	McMahon 17'	Report	Kurila 5'	Stadium: Bootham Crescent; Attendance: 3,804

5 February 1971 26	Colchester United	2–1	Cambridge United	Colchester
	Crawford 13', 74'	Report	Horrey 58'	Stadium: Layer Road; Attendance: 6,469; Referee: H Robinson

20 February 1971 27	Colchester United	4–2	Newport County	Colchester
	Simmons 44'; Mahon 45'; Lewis 65' (pen.); Crawford 79'	Report	Young 18'; Brown 23'	Stadium: Layer Road; Attendance: 6,444; Referee: R Crabb

22 February 1971 28	Colchester United	1–0	Grimsby Town	Colchester
	Mahon 47'	Report		Stadium: Layer Road; Attendance: 7,253; Referee: F Bassett

26 February 1971 29	Aldershot	0–1	Colchester United	Aldershot
		Report	Cram 3'	Stadium: Recreation Ground; Attendance: 7,609; Referee: C Nicholls

8 March 1971 30	Colchester United	2–0	Darlington	Colchester
	Crawford 23'; Simmons 35'	Report		Stadium: Layer Road; Attendance: 7,110; Referee: R Johnson

12 March 1971 31	Southend United	1–1	Colchester United	Southend-on-Sea
	Smith 77'	Report; Report	Barker 23' (o.g.)	Stadium: Roots Hall; Attendance: 9,406; Referee: Gordon Hill

16 March 1971 32	Scunthorpe United	2–0	Colchester United	Scunthorpe
	Woolmer 48'; O'Riley 77'	Report		Stadium: Old Showground; Attendance: 3,715

20 March 1971 33	Colchester United	1–1	Exeter City	Colchester
	Crawford 60'	Report	Banks 75'	Stadium: Layer Road; Attendance: 5,630

22 March 1971 34	Colchester United	2–0	Scunthorpe United	Colchester
	Crawford 52', 55'	Report		Stadium: Layer Road; Attendance: 5,592; Referee: D Biddle

27 March 1971 35	Colchester United	1–0	Southport	Colchester
	Crawford 7'	Report; Report		Stadium: Layer Road; Attendance: 5,909; Referee: M Washer

29 March 1971 36	Brentford	1–0	Colchester United	Brentford
	Neilson 87'	Report		Stadium: Griffin Park; Attendance: 9,190; Referee: A Fussey

3 April 1971 37	Northampton Town	2–1	Colchester United	Northampton
	McNeil 6', 40'	Report	Kurila 49'	Stadium: County Ground; Attendance: 7,909; Referee: Clive Thomas

9 April 1971 38	Colchester United	3–0	Peterborough United	Colchester
	Gibbs 65'; Gilchrist 73'; Hall 90'	Report; Report		Stadium: Layer Road; Attendance: 7,645

10 April 1971 39	Colchester United	1–1	Lincoln City	Colchester
	Gibbs 2'	Report	Hubbard 34'	Stadium: Layer Road; Attendance: 6,430; Referee: D Lyden

12 April 1971 40	Notts County	4–0	Colchester United	Nottingham
	Hateley 2', 9', 66'; Masson 72'	Report		Stadium: Meadow Lane; Attendance: 14,084

17 April 1971 41	Oldham Athletic	4–0	Colchester United	Oldham
	Hall 10' (o.g.); Bebbington 59', 86'; Shaw 85'	Report		Stadium: Boundary Park; Attendance: 10,045

20 April 1971 42	Grimsby Town	3–1	Colchester United	Cleethorpes
	Brace 36'; Lewis 49'; Ross 58' (pen.)	Report	Burgess 63'	Stadium: Blundell Park; Attendance: 4,166; Referee: R Raby

23 April 1971 43	Colchester United	1–1	Bournemouth & Boscombe Athletic	Colchester
	Crawford 11'	Report	MacDougall 39'	Stadium: Layer Road; Attendance: 4,168; Referee: J Taylor

26 April 1971 44	Colchester United	4–1	Barrow	Colchester
	Mahon 11'; Hall 16'; Bloss 23'; Cram 58' (pen.)	Report	Irvine 45'	Stadium: Layer Road; Attendance: 3,502; Referee: N Burtenshaw

1 May 1971 45	Crewe Alexandra	0–3	Colchester United	Crewe
		Report	Hall 11'; Crawford 46'; Mahon 49'	Stadium: Gresty Road; Attendance: 2,708; Referee: K Styles

7 May 1971 46	Colchester United	1–1	Stockport County	Colchester
	Gibbs 23'	Report	Collier 79'	Stadium: Layer Road; Attendance: 5,477

=== League Cup ===
19 August 1970 1st round	Colchester United	5–0	Cambridge United	Colchester
	Hall 10'; Owen 23', 80'; Jones 57' (pen.), 69'	Report		Stadium: Layer Road; Attendance: 6,952

9 September 1970 2nd round	Colchester United	1–1	Birmingham City	Colchester
	Jones 54'	Report	Summerill 67'	Stadium: Layer Road; Attendance: 8,095

15 September 1970 2nd round replay	Birmingham City	2–1	Colchester United	Birmingham
	Vowden 83'; Summerill 88'	Report	Jones 13'	Stadium: St Andrews; Attendance: 17,606

=== FA Cup ===
21 November 1970 1st round	Colchester United	3–0	Ringmer	Colchester
	Crawford 7', 45', 84'	Report		Stadium: Layer Road; Attendance: 6,139; Referee: R Morphew

12 December 1970 2nd round	Colchester United	3–0	Cambridge United	Colchester
	Jones 31'; Gilchrist 39'; Garvey 65'	Report		Stadium: Layer Road; Attendance: 7,348

5 January 1971 3rd round	Barnet	0–1	Colchester United	Chipping Barnet
		Report	Mahon 7'	Stadium: Underhill Stadium; Attendance: 4,990

23 January 1971 4th round	Rochdale	3–3	Colchester United	Rochdale
	Ashworth 27'; Buck 53', 61'	Report	Crawford 3'; Lewis 85'; Simmons 87'	Stadium: Spotland Stadium; Attendance: 12,321

25 January 1971 4th round	Colchester United	5–0	Rochdale	Colchester
	Lewis 42'; Simmons 44'; Parry 50' (o.g.); Crawford 70'; Mahon 76'	Report		Stadium: Layer Road; Attendance: 11,205; Referee: R Capey

13 February 1971 5th round	Colchester United	3–2	Leeds United	Colchester
	Crawford 18', 24'; Simmons 54'	Report	Hunter 60'; Giles 78'	Stadium: Layer Road; Attendance: 16,000; Referee: D Lyden

6 March 1971 6th round	Everton	5–0	Colchester United	Liverpool
15:00 BST	Kendall 23', 32'; Royle 33'; Husband 36'; Ball 82'	Report		Stadium: Goodison Park; Attendance: 53,028; Referee: J Taylor

== Squad statistics ==
=== Appearances and goals ===
No.	Pos	Nat	Player	Total		Fourth Division		FA Cup		League Cup	
No.	Pos	Nat	Player	Apps	Goals	Apps	Goals	Apps	Goals	Apps	Goals
	GK	(England) ENG	Brian Sherratt	9	0	9	0	0	0	0	0
	GK	(England) ENG	Graham Smith	47	0	37	0	7	0	3	0
	DF	(England) ENG	Eric Burgess	10	1	8+2	1	0	0	0	0
	DF	(England) ENG	Micky Cook	40	0	34+1	0	4	0	1	0
	DF	(England) ENG	Bobby Cram	53	4	43	4	7	0	3	0
	DF	(England) ENG	Alan Dennis	2	0	0+2	0	0	0	0	0
	DF	(England) ENG	Brian Garvey	54	1	44+1	0	6	1	3	0
	DF	(Scotland) SCO	John Gilchrist	38	2	28	1	5+2	1	3	0
	DF	(England) ENG	Brian Hall	52	5	41+1	4	7	0	3	1
	DF	(Scotland) SCO	John Kurila	54	2	44	2	7	0	3	0
	DF	(England) ENG	Trevor Painter	1	0	1	0	0	0	0	0
	DF	(England) ENG	Lindsay Smith	1	0	0+1	0	0	0	0	0
	MF	(England) ENG	Phil Bloss	1	1	1	1	0	0	0	0
	MF	(England) ENG	Ken Jones	37	9	32	4	2	1	3	4
	MF	(England) ENG	Steve Leslie	2	0	2	0	0	0	0	0
	MF	(England) ENG	Brian Lewis	22	4	17	2	5	2	0	0
	FW	(England) ENG	Ray Crawford	55	31	45	24	7	7	3	0
	FW	(England) ENG	Brian Gibbs	55	11	45+1	11	6	0	3	0
	FW	(England) ENG	Mick Mahon	47	7	37+1	5	7	2	2	0
	FW	(England) ENG	Brian Owen	9	4	4+2	2	0+1	0	2	2
	FW	(England) ENG	Dave Simmons	15	6	10	3	5	3	0	0
	FW	(England) ENG	Ray Whittaker	9	0	5+3	0	1	0	0	0
Players who appeared for Colchester who left during the season
	MF	(England) ENG	Roger Joslyn	8	0	7	0	0	0	1	0
	FW	(England) ENG	Roy Massey	18	4	12+4	4	1	0	0+1	0

=== Goalscorers ===
Place	Nationality	Position	Name	Fourth Division	FA Cup	League Cup	Total
1	(England)	FW	Ray Crawford	24	7	0	31
2	(England)	FW	Brian Gibbs	11	0	0	11
3	(England)	MF	Ken Jones	4	1	4	9
4	(England)	WG	Mick Mahon	5	2	0	7
5	(England)	FW	Dave Simmons	3	3	0	6
6	(England)	LB	Brian Hall	4	0	1	5
7	(England)	FB	Bobby Cram	4	0	0	4
7	(England)	MF	Brian Lewis	2	2	0	4
7	(England)	FW	Roy Massey	4	0	0	4
7	(England)	WG	Brian Owen	2	0	2	4
11	(Scotland)	FB	John Gilchrist	1	1	0	2
11	(Scotland)	CB	John Kurila	2	0	0	2
13	(England)	MF	Phil Bloss	1	0	0	1
13	(England)	FB	Eric Burgess	1	0	0	1
13	(England)	CB	Brian Garvey	0	1	0	1
			Own goals	2	1	0	3
			TOTALS	70	18	7	95

=== Disciplinary record ===
Nationality	Position	Name	Fourth Division		FA Cup		League Cup		Total	
Nationality	Position	Name	Booked	Sent off (straight red)	Booked	Sent off (straight red)	Booked	Sent off (straight red)	Booked	Sent off (straight red)
(Scotland)	CB	John Kurila	2	0	0	0	0	0	2	0
(England)	GK	Graham Smith	1	0	1	0	0	0	2	0
(England)	WG	Brian Owen	1	0	0	0	0	0	1	0
		TOTALS	4	0	1	0	0	0	5	0

=== Clean sheets ===
Number of games goalkeepers kept a clean sheet.

Place	Nationality	Player	Fourth Division	FA Cup	League Cup	Total
1	(England)	Graham Smith	11	4	1	16
2	(England)	Brian Sherratt	3	0	0	3
		TOTALS	14	4	1	19

=== Player debuts ===
Players making their first-team Colchester United debut in a fully competitive match.

Position	Nationality	Player	Date	Opponent	Ground	Notes
CB	(England)	Brian Garvey	15 August 1970	Hartlepool	Layer Road	
FB	(Scotland)	John Gilchrist	15 August 1970	Hartlepool	Layer Road	
FW	(England)	Ray Crawford	15 August 1970	Hartlepool	Layer Road	
WG	(England)	Mick Mahon	15 August 1970	Hartlepool	Layer Road	
CB	(Scotland)	John Kurila	19 August 1970	Cambridge United	Layer Road	
WG	(England)	Brian Owen	19 August 1970	Cambridge United	Layer Road	
GK	(England)	Brian Sherratt	21 September 1970	Darlington	Feethams	
CB	(England)	Trevor Painter	18 December 1970	Chester	Layer Road	
FW	(England)	Dave Simmons	26 December 1970	Lincoln City	Sincil Bank	
MF	(England)	Brian Lewis	26 December 1970	Lincoln City	Sincil Bank	
FB	(England)	Eric Burgess	20 February 1971	Newport County	Layer Road	
CB	(England)	Lindsay Smith	20 April 1971	Grimsby Town	Blundell Park	
MF	(England)	Steve Leslie	20 April 1971	Grimsby Town	Blundell Park	
MF	(England)	Phil Bloss	26 April 1971	Barrow	Layer Road	

== See also ==
- List of Colchester United F.C. seasons
