= 1971 Watney Cup =

Second edition of the Watney Cup

Watney Mann Invitation Cup

Tournament details
- Country: England; Wales
- Dates: 31 July – 7 August
- Teams: 8

Final positions
- Champions: Colchester United (1st title)
- Runners-up: West Bromwich Albion

Tournament statistics
- Matches played: 7
- Goals scored: 23 (3.29 per match)
- Attendance: 84,788 (12,113 per match)
- Top goal scorer(s): Brian Lewis; Colin Suggett (3 goals each)

The 1971 Watney Cup was the second edition of the Watney Mann Invitation Cup, a short-lived invitational association football tournament.

It was won by Colchester United, who beat West Bromwich Albion in the final at The Hawthorns.

== Background ==
The Watney Cup was introduced in 1970 to help increase the competitiveness of pre-season fixtures. Its name was a result of a sponsorship from brewing company Watney Combe & Reid. The tournament featured eight invited teams, with two selected from each division of the Football League. Those chosen to participate were the top two highest scoring teams from each division who had not gained promotion nor earned a place in a European competition the previous season.

== Format ==
The competition was a straight knockout tournament, with games that ended level going straight to penalties. This was a change from the inaugural Watney Cup, which had seen an additional 30 minutes of extra time take place to determine a winner prior to a penalty shoot-out.

== Teams ==
First Division

- Manchester United
- West Bromwich Albion

Second Division

- Carlisle United
- Luton Town

Third Division

- Halifax Town
- Wrexham

Fourth Division

- Colchester United
- Crewe Alexandra

== Tournament ==
=== Quarter-finals ===
31 July 1971

Colchester United (4)	1–0	Luton Town (2)
Lewis 78' (pen.)	Report

Layer Road, Colchester
Attendance: 8,186
31 July 1971

Crewe Alexandra (4)	1–3	Carlisle United (2)
Lowry	Report	Martin; Hatton 64', 76'

Gresty Road, Crewe
Attendance: 7,253
31 July 1971

Halifax Town (3)	2–1	Manchester United (1)
Atkins 3'; Wallace 26' (pen.)	Report	Best 81' (pen.)

The Shay, Halifax
Attendance: 19,765
31 July 1971

Wrexham (3)	1–2	West Bromwich Albion (1)
Kinsey 70'	Report	Brown 56', 62' (pen.)

Racecourse Ground, Wrexham
Attendance: 11,213

=== Semi-finals ===
4 August 1971

Colchester United (4)	2–0	Carlisle United (2)
Gibbs 46'; Lewis 52'	Report

Layer Road, Colchester
Attendance: 7,875
4 August 1971

Halifax Town (3)	0–2	West Bromwich Albion (1)
	Report	Suggett

The Shay, Halifax
Attendance: 12,009

=== Final ===
1971 Watney Cup final
- Event: 1971 Watney Cup
West Bromwich Albion	Colchester United
4	4
- Colchester won 4–3 on penalties
- Date: 7 August 1971
- Venue: The Hawthorns, West Bromwich
- Referee: David Smith (Stonehouse)
- Attendance: 18,487

The 1971 Watney Cup final was held at The Hawthorns in West Bromwich on 7 August 1971 and had an attendance of 18,487. It was contested by West Bromwich Albion and Colchester United. Colchester won the match 4–3 on penalties, following a 4–4 draw.

==== Match details ====
7 August 1971
15:00 (BST)

West Bromwich Albion	4–4	Colchester United
Cantello 16'; Astle 30', 89'; Suggett 34'	Report	Mahon 8', 67'; Simmons 32'; Lewis 86' (pen.)
Penalties
Brown (penalty scored); Astle (penalty scored); Hope (penalty scored); Wilson (penalty missed); Cantello (penalty missed)	3–4	Lewis (penalty scored); Gibbs (penalty scored); Owen (penalty scored); Cram (penalty missed); Bloss (penalty scored)

The Hawthorns, West Bromwich
Attendance: 18,487
Referee: David Smith (Stonehouse)

West Bromwich Albion	Colchester United

GK	1	(England) Jim Cumbes
RB	2	(England) Lyndon Hughes
CB	5	(England) John Wile (c)
CB	6	(England) John Kaye
LB	3	(Scotland) Ray Wilson
RM	7	(England) Colin Suggett
CM	4	(England) Len Cantello
CM	8	(England) Tony Brown
LM	11	(Scotland) Asa Hartford
CF	10	(Scotland) Bobby Hope
CF	9	(England) Jeff Astle
Manager:
(England) Don Howe

GK	1	(England) Graham Smith
RB	2	(England) Bobby Cram (c)
CB	5	(England) Brian Garvey
CB	6	(England) Eric Burgess
LB	3	(Scotland) John Gilchrist
RM	7	(England) Brian Owen
CM	4	(England) Phil Bloss
CM	8	(England) Brian Lewis
LM	11	(England) Mick Mahon
CF	9	(England) Dave Simmons
CF	10	(England) Brian Gibbs
Manager:
(England) Dick Graham

MATCH RULES

- 90 minutes.
- Penalty shoot-out if scores still level.
- Maximum of two substitutions.

== Goalscorers ==
Rank	Player	Club	Goals
1	(England) Brian Lewis	Colchester United	3
1	(England) Colin Suggett	West Bromwich Albion	3
2	(England) Jeff Astle	West Bromwich Albion	2
2	(England) Tony Brown	West Bromwich Albion	2
2	(England) Bob Hatton	Carlisle United	2
2	(England) Mick Mahon	West Bromwich Albion	2
3	9 players	Various	1
