= History of Colchester United F.C. =

History of an English football club

Colchester United is an English football club based in Colchester, Essex. The History of Colchester United F.C. began in 1937 as a professional club alongside amateur counterparts Colchester Town.

Colchester played in the Southern League from 1937 to 1950 when they were elected to the Football League and remained in the lower two divisions of the league between 1950 and 1990, when they were relegated to the Football Conference. United were promoted from the conference in 1992 and have remained a league club since.

The club made a slow climb through the Third Division and then the Second Division. In 2006, the club finished 2nd in League One, the club's highest ever finish to that point, resulting in promotion to the Championship – the second tier of English football. The following season, Colchester achieved a 10th-place finish in the Championship, their record highest finish, this despite having the divisions lowest average attendance. The following season, Colchester were relegated back to League One. In 2016 they finished 23rd and were relegated to League 2 where the club are currently competing.

== Colchester Town Era: 1873–1936 ==
Colchester Town F.C. was founded in October 1873, although they were not part of any league or association until September 1882, when club was a founder member of the Essex County FA and a season later won the inaugural Essex Senior Cup defeating Braintree by 3–1. Town reached the coveted Essex Senior Cup Final on two further occasions, losing to Ilford in 1892 and Leyton in 1900.

By 1885 a club rule change meant that it was permissible to play in shirts rather than knitted jerseys and Town changed its colours in dramatic fashion from blue tops to chocolate and pink quarters. As the new century began, the club changed its colours again – adopting red jerseys and white knickerbockers.

Nicknamed 'The Oysters', Colchester Town was not the only club in the borough, as The Excelsior club emerged and were on par with The Oysters, so much so that in September 1890 it was agreed that the two clubs would merge to play stronger teams whilst keeping their own identity for local fixtures.

With their Cambridge Road ground required for building work and the emergence of Colchester Crown, a new team to the area, it was feared that Town would fold but funds were found to prepare a new pitch for 1902–03 at Reed Hall. Town suffered a nomadic existence over the next few years playing at The Drury Field and then at Albert Road.

In 1908, the club vacated Albert Road for Sheepen Road for a pitch which became known as The Oval. The pitch was a quagmire having previously been the Borough's refuse dump. Players often took it upon their selves to jump in the nearby river after proceedings to wash off the 'municipal dust'. The Oval was often under water and Town would be forced to hire a pitch at Land Lane. The 4th Battalion Kings Rifle Regiment were the incumbent regiment in the town's Sobrahan Barracks from 1906 and in order to progress into the South Essex League had prepared a pitch on Layer Road. The first ever match staged at Layer Road was on 30 September 1907, when the KRR entertained South Weald, the Essex Senior Cup holders, which the KRR won 10–2. Matters came to a head in early 1909, as Town's attractive fixture with Norwich City Reserves in the East Anglian League was switched to Land Lane, but attracted takings of only four pounds – meanwhile the KRR's played in front of a record 4,000 Layer Road crowd as they entertained Ilford in the FA Amateur Cup. The KRR's were posted to India and on 19 April 1909, the Town committee seized the chance to secure a three-year lease on Layer Road.

For 1910–11, Town joined the South Essex League. Many famous names visited Layer Road in exhibition matches with Sheffield United, Derby, Millwall and Norwich to name a few. When Town entertained Luton in the autumn of 1911 the Committee issued what is believed to be the earliest known programme issue.

Town struggled in the South Essex League until in 1912–13 they won the title. The club also won the Essex and Suffolk Border League, the East Anglian League and the Worthington-Evans Cup.

For the 1914–15 season, a friendly match was arranged with Sparta of Rotterdam but with War looming, any chance of the game going ahead was curtailed. On 31 August 1914, the Committee met and closed down the football club. The Layer Road enclosure was earmarked for drill purposes or recreational activities by HM Forces. Seven club members are died during The Great War and their names were inscribed on a tablet in the Layer Road dressing room.

Following the announcement of Armistice the committee reformed and the club purchased the Layer Road enclosure. Town entered the 1919–20 English Cup (FA Cup) and were narrowly defeated in the Fourth qualifying round replay by Ilford at Layer Road in front of their own record crowd. In 1922–23 they joined the Middlesex and District League winning the title at the first attempt. Three years later Town found themselves in the Spartan League, their best season saw them finishing fourth in 1928–29, but more often they were placed around 10th in the thirteen-team League.

The East Anglian Cup was secured in 1931–32 with limited success, Town joined the Eastern Counties League in 1935–36. Town finished joint top with Harwich & Parkeston in that inaugural Eastern Counties League season. Although Town were joint-reigning champions, attendances were poor and moves were afoot to form a new professional club in Colchester.

2 March 1936 marked the end for Town and the birth of a team that would become Colchester United. The committee had hoped to run the Amateurs alongside the Professionals, but Essex County rules stated that a single group could not run the affairs of clubs of differing status.

== Formation and Southern League Success: 1937–1939 ==
On 14 July 1937 came the announcement that the professional new club would be named Colchester United F.C. – a week after new manager Ted Davis' used his Huddersfield Town contacts enabled the players to be kitted out in the same blue and white strip as his former club. United's first-ever Layer Road game was against Bath City on Thursday 2 September in the Southern League Midweek Section. United won 6–1 with Reg Smith registering the club's first-ever hat-trick. Two days later 11,000 witnessed a thrilling 3–3 Layer Road draw with neighbours Ipswich Town in the Southern League. Bill Barraclough became United's first sending off when he questioned the referee's parentage in the November fixture with Norwich City Reserves.

United adopted the nickname of 'The U's' to distinguish themselves from 'The Oysters' of Town. The popularity of United finally spelt the end for Colchester Town. The Oysters, in serious financial difficulty, folded in December 1937, having dropped into the six-club Essex Senior League before re-appearing to complete an Essex Senior Cup tie in January 1938 in order to avoid a hefty fine. This enabled United to enter a reserve side into the Eastern Counties League a month later, with their squad now boosted by Colchester Town's redundant amateurs. United finished mid-table in their first season and reached the Southern League Cup Final. A two-legged affair – they lost 2–1 at Yeovil over Easter 1938 but triumphed 3–1 at Layer Road to win the club's first-ever trophy.

In their second season, the 1938–39 season, United claimed the Southern League championship scoring 110 goals in 44 games, finished runners up in the Midweek section and reached the Southern League Cup semi-finals. With hopes of election to the Football League, director Walter Clark presented U's case to the Football League members on 23 May 1938, however, Colchester did not receive a single vote in their favour. Once again War loomed over Europe. After just three Southern League games in the 1939–40 season, War was declared and, as with Town beforehand, the club closed down. United continued to play friendly matches against local opposition up until December 1939, with the Army Fire Fighting Corp taking over the ground for drill practice.

== Post-War Election: 1945–1950 ==
Former Town player Syd Fieldus had kept the club alive but dormant during the War years. Fieldus was appointed Secretary-Manager and attended the first post-War Southern League meeting in the summer of 1945. Fieldus forged a strong relationship with the Garrison, and as United only had four contracted players, the Colchester team was complemented by servicemen of varying degrees of ability for the 1945–46 season. Ted Fenton was appointed manager for the 1946–47 season, who had turned out for Colchester Town in the early 1930s whilst a teenager. Fenton had excellent contacts and wasted no time in assembling his team from an array of professionals looking for a new start after the long War years. United finished mid-table in that first season after hostilities. During the 1947–48 season, Colchester United had a magnificent run in the FA Cup, consisting of a 3–2 victory against neighbours Chelmsford City in the Fourth qualifying round, followed by a win over Banbury Spencer by a slim 2–1 margin. Wrexham, of the Third Division North were duly dispatched by a Bob Curry goal with both sides missing penalties. Ironically it was First Division Huddersfield, the club that had inspired United's own team strip, who were next to be put to the sword, and a fourth round win over Bradford Park Avenue drew Colchester against Blackpool, where they bowed out in a 5–0 defeat.

Expectations of another great FA Cup run for the 1948–49 season fuelled the imagination and a record Layer Road crowd of 19,072 gathered for the first-round tie with Reading on 27 November 1948. Thick fog forced the abandonment of the tie after just 35 minutes. Colchester lost 4–2 in the rescheduled tie.

On 3 June 1950, Colchester United were elected to the Football League. At the time of the election, the club's Supporters Club membership of over 16,000 and an average attendance of 8,500, achieving these figures after 7 full seasons of competition following the War. The U's left non-League football with the following record:

- Southern League champions: 1938–39
- Southern League runners-up: 1949–50
- Southern League Cup winners: 1937–38, 1949–50
- Southern League Cup runners-up: 1947–48, 1948–49

== Into the Football League: 1950–1959 ==
Colchester's first-ever League game was against old Southern League foes Gillingham at Priestfield on 19 August 1950. A crowd of 19,542 witnessed a 0–0 draw. Five days later Bob Curry scored United's first-ever League goal in a 1–1 draw at Swindon. However, it was not until 31 August in the 1950–51 season that Layer Road enjoyed its first U's goal. Arthur Turner struck five minutes into a 4–1 win in the return game with Swindon. Colchester remained unbeaten in their first seven games – a run equalling a record for new clubs entering the Football League set by Aberdare Athletic in 1921–22.

The 1951–52 season started with six defeats in the opening seven games due mainly to an injury-ravaged squad. United sat rooted to the foot of the Third Division South table, but a mid season revival including completing the double over local rivals Ipswich hoisted United to 10th in the final standings. Vic Keeble became United's first big time transfer when he moved to First Division Newcastle for a massive £15,000 fee.

In the 1952–53 season, a run of just one point from the last six games then saw United slip from 13th to just one place and two points above the re-election zone. Criticised by supporters for his style of play, manager Jimmy Allen resigned on 2 May 1953. The Board appointed Ron Meades as player-manager. Meades had presented his CV claiming to have been with Cardiff and more recently manager of Western League side Wadebridge Town. A piece of investigative journalism by U's reporter Arthur Wood revealed that Meades was a fraud and after four days in charge Meades was asked to leave by a very embarrassed United hierarchy. Jack Butler, a former Arsenal player, was hurriedly appointed manager.

Butler had little time to prepare his side and a 13-game run without winning saw United in 23rd spot. Crowds plummeted and the club had to go to the Football League to apply for re-election after finishing 10 points adrift of the safety of 22nd place. Fortunately the U's polled 45 votes. From being prolific scorers in their early history United scored just 50 League goals in 1953–54. Another run of eight consecutive defeats saw United at the bottom of the League on Christmas Day 1954. A four-game turn about in form saw United rise out of the re-election places, but after falling ill in November, Butler was given indefinite leave until the end of his contract in 1956. Suffering from a nervous breakdown Butler resigned in January 1955.

The Board chose Benny Fenton to be Butler's replacement as player-manager, although United picked up just one point from their last eight games. Colchester had to again go to the Football League to retain their status, accompanied by Walsall for the second successive season, both being successful.

Fenton assembled his own squad for 1955–56. He signed Percy Ames who would have an incredible run of appearances in United's goal, and then Fenton gained a reputation for spotting players in Scottish Junior football with the acquisition of John Fowler, Sammy McLeod and Bobby Hill. United finished 12th, their best-ever League finish. 1956–57 proved to be Colchester's best finish in their history, a position that was not bettered until 2006. For most of the season United were certainties for promotion. They went 20 League games undefeated between December 1956 and Easter 1957. United hosted third-placed rivals Ipswich at Layer Road, Colchester having a seven-point advantage, although Town had a game in hand. A record crowd for a Layer Road League game – 18,559 – witnessed a 0–0 draw. Over 4,000 were turned away and 120 fans watched from the Popular Side roof as the game went down in United folklore when Fenton missed a 21st-minute penalty. A 2–1 win over second-placed Torquay, who trailed by four points as a result, put United in first place. But three consecutive draws allowed Torquay to close the gap to one point with Ipswich five points adrift. Colchester won their final game of the season 2–0 against Watford to go top, but both Ipswich and Torquay's final games were 24 hours later. Both won, United slipped to third and Ipswich went up as champions level with Torquay and a point ahead of The U's.

With Football League re-organisation on the agenda, the priority for 1957–58 was to finish in the top twelve as those clubs would join the top twelve in the Third Division North to form the new country-wide Third Division. The remainder would form the Fourth Division. It was not until the last game of the season that a 4–2 Layer Road win over Southampton secured 12th place and that coveted place in the Third Division.

A very good fifth-placed finish in 1958–59, nine points behind second-placed Hull, included a club record 8–2 win over Stockport on 4 October 1958. The highlight of the season was another FA Cup run. Early round victories over Bath, Yeovil and Chesterfield brought the mighty Arsenal to Layer Road in the fourth round. The result was a 2–2 draw and in the return 62,686 saw The Gunners run out 4–0 winners on a frost-bound pitch obscured by thick fog.

== Between Two Divisions: 1960–1970 ==
United lost just two games at Layer Road during the 1959–60 season but won just three on their travels and finished a creditable 9th in the table. In the 1960–61 season, United lost ten home games finishing in 23rd position and suffering relegation for the first time in their history to the Fourth Division. Obtaining just one point from eleven games, including seven straight defeats, the U's hit rock bottom in October 1960 and they never managed to climb out of the bottom four. Colchester did enjoy some early season success when in the inaugural League Cup competition they comprehensively defeated First Division Newcastle 4–1 at Layer Road in front of 9,130 before bowing out to Southampton in Round Two.

United commenced their 1961–62 campaign by going unbeaten in their first nine League games and scored 31 goals in the first eight home games to top the Fourth Division. United set their club record victory in the match against Bradford City on 30 December 1961. Both Martyn King and his strike partner Bobby Hunt scored four goals each, and Bobby Hill one, as The U's ran out 9–1 winners. Millwall took the title by one point from runners-up Colchester with 11 defeats on the road costing the U's dearly.

For 1962–63, Martyn King led the League scoring charts with 26 goals while Bobby Hunt scored 19. A leaky defence, U's conceded 93 goals, meant that mid-table was the best U's could hope for.

The 1963–64 season proved to be one of change. Out went manager Benny Fenton who took over the manager's role at Orient in November 1963. Replacing him was former Stoke and England centre-half Neil Franklin. His first transfer at Layer Road was to sell Bobby Hunt to First Division-bound Northampton for £20,000. Hunt already had 20 goals from 33 League games when he left with King reaching 18 by the end of a disappointing 16th placed campaign.

In the 1964–65 season, Franklin sold King to Wrexham in October. This, and the Hunt sale the previous season, did not impress the U's faithful. Bringing in 14 new players in just a season and a half proved too much of an upheaval for United. Colchester were relegated back to the Fourth Division with Franklin having already being given a year's contract extension mid-season.

In 1965–66, as they did four years previously, United bounced back up from the Fourth Division at the first attempt. United won ten games on their travels, a new club record, and lost just three times at Layer Road. Colchester led the table at Easter but defeats by Darlington (twice) and Torquay saw United drop to fourth place prior to the last game of the season. A disastrous 2–1 defeat at mid-table Newport had U's fans biting their nails as Luton were only a point behind and their game at Chester had kicked off 15 minutes later. In the end the game finished 1–1 and with the U's, Tranmere and the Hatters tied on 56 points it was down to goal average to separate the sides. Franklin's side pipped Tranmere by 0.08 (equivalent to about 6 goals difference in today's rules).

Franklin boosted his squad with the signings of forwards Peter Bullock and Ken Hodgson. The moves proved profitable as the pair scored 15 and 16 League goals respectively. Fellow striker Reg Stratton scored 24 goals and it was something of a surprise that U's only finished mid-table. Franklin suggested that the 1966–67 season would be one of consolidation in readiness for a push for the elusive Second Division place that Colchester desired.

In 1967–68, a fantastic season for FA Cup football, Colchester were dreadful in the League. A trip to Torquay earned United a first-round replay at Layer Road which they won 2–1 to set up a local derby at Chelmsford. New Writtle Street was packed with 16,400 as United despatched the Southern Leaguers by 2–0. Once again Layer Road hosted a top flight side as West Bromwich Albion visited in the third round. An all ticket crowd of just under 16,000 saw United take an early lead through Stratton only for the Baggies to equalise with a questionable penalty. United sank by 4–0 at The Hawthorns in the replay. With all the attention on the FA Cup, U's League form had dipped. From being within a striking distance of a promotion place, Colchester lost 15 of their remaining 22 games after Boxing Day 1967 winning just once. Colchester's third relegation in eight seasons was too much and Franklin was sacked just two days after the season's end.

Colchester's new manager was Dick Graham. He had led Crystal Palace from the Fourth to the Second Division and his mandate was clear – he needed to emulate his work at Selhurst Park. United finished 1968–69 in 6th position just four points short of promotion. For 1969–70, Graham adopted a policy of employing an older more experienced player. He chose Bobby Cram, formerly of West Brom, and previously playing in Canada, to become his captain. An eleven-game unbeaten home run gave United hope of a promotion push but a crippling injury list – even trainer Dennis Mochan had to dig out his boots – was a bridge too far as United finished tenth.

== Cup Heroics: 1970–1980 ==
Graham increased the average age of United's squad for the 1970–71 season with the summer signings of ex-England international Ray Crawford, Brian Garvey, John Kurila, Mick Mahon and Brian Owen.

In the FA Cup, United disposed of non-League Ringmer via a Crawford hat trick in round one and then defeated Cambridge United in round two. Colchester knocked out non-League Barnet at Underhill in the third round only to be drawn away to Rochdale. Trailing 3–1 with just five minutes left, United staged a remarkable comeback to earn a replay. With the knowledge of the fifth-round draw having been made, United trounced hapless Dale by 5–0 to earn a home tie with mighty Leeds on 13 February 1971. Leeds were top of the First Division and boasted ten internationals in their side, Colchester were eighth in the Fourth Division. Nobody gave the U's a chance but they raced into a 3–0 lead, in front of a 16,000 Layer Road crowd, with goals from Crawford (2) and Dave Simmons before Leeds generated something of a comeback to finally lose 3–2. The result was sensational as was the fact that United were in the FA Cup Quarter Finals. Sixth round opponents Everton did their homework and Graham's 'Granddads Army' finally succumbed to the tune of 5–0 in front of 53,028 at Goodison Park.

While United finished sixth, just two points off promotion – they simply had too many fixtures to complete in rapid succession as a result of the cup run. The U's goalscoring prowess however did qualify them for the 1971–72 pre-season Watney Cup. The competition was open to the two highest scoring teams from each division that had not won promotion. U's saw off Luton and Carlisle at Layer Road to reach the final against West Bromwich Albion, at The Hawthorns. A thrilling encounter saw the tie level at 4–4 after extra time leading to Colchester's first-ever penalty shoot-out. Albion missed two and U's one leaving youngster Phil Bloss to slam home the decisive winning spot-kick.

After the exploits of the previous season's cup run and now Watney Cup success, United were firm favourites for promotion. But with an ageing side and an increasing club debt, Graham turned full circle and introduced youth to United's side. Steve Leslie, Steve Foley, Lindsay Smith, Micky Cook and John McLaughlin were just some who came in during the rapid break up of Granddad's Army. All would become regulars in United's side but youth alone was not sufficient for United to maintain a serious promotion bid and they finished 1971–72 in eleventh place, nine points adrift of promotion.

At the club's AGM in September 1972, Graham was so incensed of the questioning of his team and tactics by a shareholder that he tendered his resignation. The shareholder, it was alleged, had won his five shares in a raffle but his actions put United in chaos.

A month later an unknown Jim Smith was appointed manager. He had led Boston United to the Northern Premier League title and one of his first signings was Boston striker Bobby Svarc for £6,000 but United had just six points from 13 games and sat bottom of the entire League. Smith's arrival gave an initial boost and he actually collected the Manager of the Month award for lifting United off the bottom. The U's earned a maximum 48 votes from their fellow clubs after finishing 22nd. Smith brought wisely in the summer, bringing in Mike Walker and Mick Packer from Watford and splashing out a club record £11,000 on striker Paul Aimson. Whilst Aimson suffered a career-ending injury early in the season, Svarc scored 25 league goals including a record equalling four goal haul at Chester in November 1973. U's led the table around Christmas time, but failure to beat Peterborough and Gillingham at Layer Road cost them the championship. United were promoted in third place five points behind Peterborough and two adrift of the Gills. The final home game of the season drew a 10,007 crowd as Gillingham stole runners-up spot with a 2–0 win. This would be the last time that Layer Road hosted a five-figure League attendance.

For the 1974–75 season, United were back in the Third Division but the board warned that a break-even gate of 9,200 was required and that players would be sold if gates didn't reach 7,500. Crowds fell way short of the board's ambitions with an average of 4,941 as United finished eleventh. Having reached the Quarter Finals of the FA Cup only four seasons previously, United emulated that achievement in the League Cup. Beating Oxford and Southend, the U's hosted First Division Carlisle beating the Cumbrians 2–0 to earn a home tie with Southampton. A 0–0 draw at Layer Road led to an amazing 1–0 replay win at The Dell, setting up a Quarter Final tie with Aston Villa. The Midlanders proved too strong for United winning 2–1. The League Cup run brought recognition – only it was for U's manager Smith who left to join Second Division Blackburn in the summer of 1975. His coach Bobby Roberts was appointed manager.

United did not win any of their first five games of the 1975–76 season, and Blackburn paid £25,000 taking Bobby Svarc. Roberts' side rallied mid-season to climb to twelfth place but defeats including 6–1 at Chesterfield and 6–0 at Brighton put Colchester back into the relegation mire. United were relegated with Steve Leslie leading scoring with a record low total of just six league goals. The Board kept faith with Roberts for the 1976–77 campaign and, just as they did in the 1960s, United bounced back at the first attempt. United reached the fourth round of the FA Cup only to lose to First Division Derby in a replay at The Baseball Ground.

In 1977–78, Colchester soared to the top of the Third Division table with four straight wins at the start of the following season. Embarking on a League Cup run that saw United thump Second Division Blackburn 4–0 in a second-round replay before facing up to Leeds at Elland Road in the next round. Leeds gained some revenge with a 4–0 win. One win in ten after January and the sale of Colin Garwood to Portsmouth for £25,000 spelt the end of United's promotion aspirations. Colchester finished in eighth place and eight points behind third-placed Preston.

Cash-strapped United splashed out £15,000 on Millwall's Trevor Lee who became the first black player to represent Colchester's first team. Once again, United fell short of promotion finishing seventh – nine points behind third-placed Swansea. In the final game of the 1978–79 season on 9 May, United recorded their biggest ever away win in the League with a 5–1 romp at Tranmere.

Colchester had another cup run, and after disposing of Oxford, with a Bobby Gough hat trick, defeating Leatherhead with a 4–0 replay win and overcoming tricky away ties at Darlington and Newport, the U's welcomed Manchester United to Layer Road. Colchester came close to an Old Trafford replay only for Jimmy Greenhoff to score an 86th-minute winner.

The 1979–80 season saw Colchester beat Watford over two legs in the League Cup and were then drawn at home to Aston Villa. A 2–0 defeat at home meant to many that the tie was over, but remarkably United went to Villa Park and won 2–0 to take the game to extra time and then penalties. So successful were all the takers that it was necessary for the goalkeepers to take their turn. U's stalwart Mike Walker missed his and Colchester bowed out 9–8. The U's were in fine form in the League from then on going ten games undefeated and level on points with Sheffield United at the top. Chairman Maurice Cadman announced that Layer Road needed £280,000 of basic improvements just to meet the then safety legislation. The club could not relocate because the club could not sell the land for housing, among other reasons.

Tracking the leaders for most of the season, with ten away wins to boot, United succumbed to successive defeats by Blackpool, Blackburn and Reading, and with injuries to Steve Foley and Bobby Gough, the goalscoring was left to Lee who returned 18 League and Cup strikes. Colchester finished fifth place and six points short of the promotion places. It was the closest that the club had come to the Second Division since the 1956–57.

== Financial Difficulties and Decline: 1980–1990 ==
The club received their first-ever shirt sponsorship from Royal London Insurance in the 1980–81 season but failed to win in the opening eight games. Beating Millwall 3–0 in the ninth attracted national coverage. Sergeant Frank Ruggles of Essex Police marched on the field and tried to arrest Lions' defender Mel Blyth for swearing. Six consecutive home wins saw Colchester well placed at Christmas. But when Trevor Lee moved to Gillingham in a club record deal worth £90,000 form dipped and United slipped down the table. Roberts matched the record fee in recruiting Roger Osborne and also paid £15,000 for both Roy McDonough and Phil Coleman. Eight games without a win meant relegation by just two points, and amid news of a 25,000 all-seater stadium development came the stark reality of a new all-time lowest attendance of 1,430 at the final day win over Carlisle. The Council refused the new stadium plans.

Three points for a win helped United hit top spot in Division Four by November 1981 scoring an incredible 41 goals. The U's also reached the FA Cup third round, drawing with Newcastle at St James' Park before losing a thrilling 4–3 replay. £25,000 brought striker John Lyons who scored on his debut as Colchester thrashed rivals Sheffield United 5–2 in front of the Match of the Day cameras. But a host of injuries and suspensions saw United free-fall down the table and Roberts was asked to resign in April 1982. He refused and was promptly sacked a month later. Colchester had gone from promotion certainties to sixth, 16 points off the pace despite boasting a prolific strike force.

Former Ipswich centre-half Allan Hunter accepted a player-manager's role and introduced former Ipswich coach Cyril Lea as his assistant for 1982–83. United led the table undefeated in seven games. The season then turned in the most tragic of circumstances as John Lyons committed suicide at home in November 1982 within 48 hours after turning out at Layer Road against Chester.

On the back of having to give up his own playing career through injury and the Lyons tragedy, Hunter resigned in January 1983 with United in seventh place. Lea took over until the end of the campaign and won 8 of his first eleven games. Four defeats in 17 days during April cost U's and again they finished sixth just two points away from promotion.

Four months after becoming caretaker, Lea was appointed full-time with Stewart Houston assisting. United embarked on another League Cup run, securing a fine 1–1 draw at Second Division Swansea, United Chairman Cadman then pledged that if more than 5,000 attended the second leg at Layer Road that he would give Lea funds to buy two more players. The U's beat the Swans 1–0 in front of 5,204 and his promise was underwritten when Colchester drew Manchester United in the third round on 8 November 1983. The 13,031 crowd was the last-ever five figure gate at Layer Road and the slick Red Devils ran out comfortable 2–0 winners. As had become the norm U's form tailed off and they ended 15 points adrift of promotion in eighth place despite 31 goals from Tony Adcock.

Chairman Maurice Cadman announced that win bonuses would be dropped for the 1984–85 season with an insurance-backed promotion bonus on offer and the club was available for sale at £150,000. United also lost their shirt sponsors but Jonathan Crisp paid £150,000 for overall control of United, promising Second Division football within five years. In the light of the horrific Bradford City stadium fire, the timber-constructed Layer Road stands and terracing meant that it was of utmost importance to accelerate United's move to a new stadium. With Heysel Stadium disaster following on the heels of Bradford, Layer Road faced £500,000 worth of safety improvements. With no money, the club closed areas of Layer Road reducing capacity to 4,900. United were just not quite good enough for promotion finishing seventh and ten points adrift of fourth place.

Topping the table in October 1985, the U's imploded, suffering six successive League defeats, four without scoring. Lea couldn't find a strike partner for Adcock following Keith Bowen's career-ending car crash. The manager had a good record and produced a free-scoring side but could not get the club over the promotion finishing line and three weeks from the end of the season he was sacked.

Former goalkeeper Mike Walker, coach of U's reserves, took over as Caretaker and United were unbeaten in the remaining eight matches – winning five. Walker had hoisted U's to seventh just nine points short of promotion. It was a notable season for hat tricks with Perry Groves twice achieving the feat against Southend and brothers Tommy and Tony English scoring trebles within five days of each other. The English brothers were both sent off at Crewe in a game which United won 2–0.

Colchester were the bookies favourites for 1986–87 despite selling Groves to Arsenal for £75,000. Maurice Cadman handed over the chair to Crisp and Walker was appointed full-time becoming Colchester's fourth manager of the 1980s. For the first time promotion play-offs were introduced and seven successive away defeats meant the U's would have to attempt promotion via this method. Wolves won at Layer Road with a 2–0 win. The scoreless return at Molineux meant yet another season in the basement division.

Tony Adcock joined Second Division Manchester City for £80,000. Walker recruited former U's boss Allan Hunter as his coach whilst Crisp announced an ill-advised bombshell. In light of the worsening hooliganism countrywide he adopted a 100% members-only scheme banning away fans. To deflect the furore Crisp leaked details of a proposed new stadium and introduced developers Norcross Estates as shirt sponsors. Only 1,300 members attended the first fixture of the 1987–88 season, a drop of 1,400 on the previous average.

Walker broke the club's transfer record spending £40,000 on striker Dale Tempest while a new lowest crowd was set as 1,140 watched the 29 September 1987 win over Swansea. Having rebuilt his side winning seven out of eight games Walker was sensationally sacked by Crisp as United were joint top of the Fourth Division. Crisp claimed Walker had resigned, but an alleged personal matter between the pair was said to have been the spark. Walker was awarded Manager of the Month after he had been sacked.

New manager Roger Brown took over a successful team and destroyed it. Recommended to Crisp by his advisors, Brown had been a factory manager and in charge at Poole Town. From top spot on New Years Day Brown's team won just five games to finish ninth – United's lowest position for 15 seasons. When hundreds of Wolves fans claimed membership and boosted the Layer Road attendance to 2,413, Crisp scrapped his membership scheme declaring it had only been an experiment. The season's average was a paltry 1,769.

Crisp considered selling Layer Road and ground sharing with Ipswich whilst the new stadium was built. He was swayed by a group of ex-directors of the club. The stadium plans were delayed over land ownership, and if plans had gone ahead, United would have been totally homeless with no assets bar players. Having already inflicted United's joint record defeat of 7–0 back in 1952, Leyton Orient went one better and despatched Brown's sorry team by 8–0 at Brisbane Road on 15 October 1988. He was then sacked. Caretaker Steve Foley disposed of Brown's misfits introducing his own youth team players Gary Bennett, Mark Radford and Scott Daniels. League form did not improve and United sunk to 92nd, a position they had not occupied since 1972.

Foley's team embarked on another FA Cup run. They saw off Fulham, Swansea and Second Division Shrewsbury. In the fourth round, a 3–3 draw at Bramall Lane forced Sheffield United back to fog-shrouded Layer Road. U's lost 2–0 but they had the mercurial former Glasgow Rangers manager Jock Wallace in charge with England World Cup winner Alan Ball as his assistant. Crowds rose to over 3,500 as the town became gripped by the passion of Wallace. Paul McGee was sold to Wimbledon for a new record £150,000 fee and on 29 April 1989 United travelled to closest rivals Darlington in a do-or-die battle. Robert Scott's goal earned a 2–1 win to lift U's off the bottom for the first time since Brown's departure. Two successive home wins against Halifax and Exeter confirmed U's Fourth Division status.

Hopes of building on the Wallace regime were tattered when Colchester failed to win any of the opening eight games of 1989–90. Only two wins were secured before the turn of the year. Ball left for Stoke and it was a closely guarded secret that Wallace was very ill with the onset of Parkinson's Disease. Steve Foley was put in temporary charge. Many wanted him appointed permanently but Foley preferred his youth team duties. Crisp's regime was now over £1m in debt and his next new manager was former Ipswich and England defender Mick Mills, recently sacked from Stoke. The new appointment had immediate effect as U's won three out of four in February and, as with the season before, faced up to a crunch game at the home of their nearest rivals. Leading Wrexham twice United succumbed to a 3–2 defeat. However, six defeats in the last eight games ended United's 40 season Football League tenure. Crisp's dream of Second Division football in five years was light years away and new plans for a stadium were rejected. Colchester bowed out of the Football League with the following record:

- Fourth Division runners-up: 1961–62
- Fourth Division promoted: 1965–66, 1973–74, 1976–77
- FA Cup quarter-finalists: 1970–71
- League Cup quarter-finalists: 1974–75
- Watney Cup winners: 1971–72

== Three Trips to Wembley: 1990–2000 ==
Lincoln and Darlington had both returned to the League at the first attempt from the Conference and the onus was on new player-manager Ian Atkins to achieve the same. United remained full-time wearing a navy and white striped kit. Layer Road was sold back to the council for £1.2m to help clear debts with the club leasing for a maximum of three seasons. Barnet and Kettering were U's main challengers and it took until April for U's to hit top spot, but Colchester finished runners-up by two points. Atkins then left to join Birmingham as coach.

New chairman James Bowdidge appointed Roy McDonough in a player-manager role. At just 34, McDonough had been Atkins' assistant and vowed to go for goals abandoning Atkins' stoic sweeper system. McDonough equalled the club record scoring four at Slough, but couldn't have planned the astonishing goal that gave U's victory at sole rivals Wycombe. In the dying moments, goalkeeper Scott Barrett's long punt down field skidded up off the greasy surface into the net to give Colchester a priceless 2–1 win, and U's completed the double soon after winning 3–0 at Layer Road.

The U's became the first team in history to be knocked out of the FA Cup without conceding a goal. Twice they drew 0–0 with Exeter only to lose on penalties; the consolation was that they led Wycombe by seven points as 1992 dawned. A dreadful 4–1 defeat at Welling and a lackadaisical 4–4 draw at Macclesfield threatened to derail U's surge back to the League. United's focus wasn't solely on the Conference they progressed to the Wembley Final of the FA Trophy having knocked out Kingstonian, Merthyr, Morecambe, Telford and Macclesfield on the way.

At just 34, McDonough had delivered his promise. He himself had netted 29 times with Steve McGavin (26) and Gary Bennett (18) part of the 98 goal League haul. as Wycombe trailed by eight goals going into the last game. United annihilated Barrow 5–0 with a Mike Masters hat trick to claim the Championship.

A week later 32,254 roared United, in their first-ever Wembley appearance, to a famous non-League double gaining revenge over Witton Albion with Masters, McGavin and Nicky Smith scoring in a 3–1 win. Colchester's time in the Conference led to the following achievements:

- Football Conference champions: 1991–92
- Football Conference runners-up: 1990–91
- FA Trophy winners: 1991–92

With the advent of the Premier League, it meant that Colchester jumped two Leagues, in name, to Division Three. U's lost four of their first five league games and sunk to the bottom and they also suffered a hefty FA fine for their indiscipline on the field. The attacking approach was not as effective against League teams as United conceded 7, 5 and 4 goals on six occasions. Despite this they rallied, with a young Mark Kinsella blossoming and finished just four points shy of a play-off place.

The early games of 1993–94, United just could not defend and McDonough, having used six goalkeepers in the wake of Barrett's departure, found himself in goal at Hereford in October 1993. McGavin moved to Birmingham for £150,000 in January with no funds made available, taking a consortium of local businessmen to raise £10,000 to buy Steve Whitton on deadline day to fill the gap. On the last day of a disappointing campaign, McDonough received a silver salver from Chairman Gordon Parker in recognition of his 500th career appearance. Three days later it was Parker, his father-in-law, that told McDonough he was sacked.

George Burley was appointed manager in July 1994. His reign started with six straight defeats as Burley dug out his boots, brought in new faces and called upon Dale Roberts as coach. United then suffered just one defeat in the next 20 League and Cup matches. Burley resigned as manager on Christmas Eve 1994 after being tapped up by Ipswich, who had been refused permission to speak to him, and Burley walked out with Colchester in 5th place.

Ex-player Steve Wignall was appointed as new manager in January 1995. United gained just two points from the last four games of the season and finished 12 points adrift. Wignall resigned Tony Adcock and the loan signing of Scott McGleish rejuvenated United's season and the U's just needed to beat Doncaster in their last fixture to reach the play-offs. Paul Gibbs cross-cum-shot sealed a narrow win to send Colchester to the play-offs.

Neil Warnock's Plymouth stood in United's way of a second trip to Wembley. Mark Kinsella's long ranger sealed a 1–0 first leg lead and rammed Warnock's words down his throat. Warnock had taunted: "Little teams like Colchester shouldn't even be on the same pitch as big clubs like Plymouth."

His side, assembled for over £1m, quickly moved in front at Home Park against a U's side costing £2,000, but Kinsella pulled the score back level and more with a vital away goal. Five minutes from time U's hearts were broken when Plymouth added a third.

For 1996–97, Kinsella finally got the move his talents deserved. A bargain £150,000 took him to Charlton and there was early League Cup cheer when U's turned a 3–2 deficit with a 3–1 victory at First Division West Bromwich Albion – all the more noteworthy as striker Whitton played the entire second half in goal.

Paul Buckle scored Colchester's first ever Golden Goal against Millwall in the Auto Windscreen Shield and wins over Brentford and Northampton set up a Southern Final with Peterborough. All looked lost with a 2–0 first leg defeat but Paul Abrahams' glorious Golden Goal sent United to Wembley. The Wembley Final against Carlisle, played in front of 45,077, ended in a 0–0 draw after extra time. Peter Cawley and a young Karl Duguid missed from the spot leaving the Cumbrians to hoist the trophy in the cruellest of manners. Three wins and a draw after Wembley meant that United missed out on the play-offs by just one point.

In the 1997–98 season, Wignall broke the club's transfer record spending £50,000 on Neil Gregory. The U's won 10 of their last 15 missing automatic promotion by one point, but more importantly qualifying for the play-offs. Barnet held a 1–0 lead at Layer Road, but a brace from David Gregory, the second in extra time, turned the tie in U's favour and earned a third trip to Wembley in six years. David Gregory's 22nd-minute penalty was enough to fire U's back to the third tier after 17 years away.

Division Two boasted fallen giants in Manchester City and Stoke and Kevin Keegan led the Mohamed Al-Fayed revolution at Fulham. A preferred site was found for the new stadium at Cuckoo Farm, which was owned by the council.

From the stage of Maine Road and a loyal 25,000 home crowd, Wignall faced his FA Cup nemesis at the tiny Northumberland outpost of Bedlington. Bedlington Terriers walloped United 4–1 the most embarrassing defeat in the club's history. U's won just one of the next nine including a 5–1 home defeat to Gillingham in the Auto Windscreen Shield. In January 1999, seven days after unleashing a raw Lomana LuaLua into the first team, Wignall quit citing that he had taken his team as far as he could and was frustrated at the role agents were playing in transfer deals he was trying to set up.

Steve Whitton, his assistant became Caretaker before Mick Wadsworth fought off the challenge of Cheltenham's Steve Cotterill to become the new manager. He kept Whitton on and brought in a number of foreign players including Brazilian Fumaça and Frenchmen Stéphane Pounewatchy and Fabrice Richard. Fumaca's Colchester career lasted just 14 minutes after being pole-axed. The season's end brought swingeing cuts to the playing staff. Nine were axed including Joe Dunne and Tony Adcock, who fell tantalisingly four goals short of Martyn King's club record of 131 career goals.

== The Championship and a New Home: 2000–2010 ==
Within two weeks of the 1999–2000 season, manager Wadsworth declared that, living in Pontefract, Colchester was too far south to drive – then, directly after a League Cup tie at Selhurst Park, joined Crystal Palace.

Wadsworth had removed fans favourites and brought in a number of highly paid players, spending the entire playing budget. Most of these players were linked to controversial football agent Barry Silkman. When midfielder Brian Launders was sacked for gross misconduct, Silkman took United to Court and this exposed the influence agents had on the game, something Steve Wignall had pre-empted. As a result, United, now led by Chairman Peter Heard, invoked a policy of not dealing with agents ever again.

Heard appointed Steve Whitton as manager in August 1999. One win in eleven including a 5–2 mauling at Cambridge saw United bottom by October. Whitton re-instated Joe Dunne, Tony Lock and Richard Wilkins and re-signed Steve McGavin. A thrilling 5–4 January 2000 win over Bristol Rovers was the highlight of the season and the emergence of the skilful Lua Lua, with 14 goals, complemented 16 from McGavin.

Colchester were not going to hold on to Lua Lua for long and a stunning hat-trick at QPR turned a 1–0 first leg defeat into a 4–3 aggregate win. The virtuoso performance by the youngster from Kinshasa persuaded Newcastle boss Bobby Robson to part with a staggering £2.25m in September 2000, and the deal secured the medium term future of the club. Whitton steered his troops to six points clear of relegation.

The 2001–02 season kicked off with an entertaining 6–3 win at Chesterfield. United were top of Division Two by the end of August and knocked First Division Portsmouth out of the League Cup at Fratton Park. Despite Whitton equalling the record transfer fee of £50,000 for Northern Ireland international Adrian Coote, the U's finished 15th – a steady year on year improvement after recording 18th and then 17th places previously. Whitton was content with the way he was progressing the club but the supporters were not.

The collapse of ITV Digital spelt disaster for many clubs who had spent their money on players or new facilities before it had reached them. Prudently, Heard never budgeted more than his club could afford. Whitton was unable to bolster his squad to push on quicker and after losing to Conference side Chester in the FA Cup at Layer Road and seven games without a win he left by mutual consent in January 2003.

Assistant Geraint Williams took caretaker charge, fared well, and put himself forward as a candidate. However, with his many contacts at FA Board level, Heard introduced a surprise when he appointed Reading's player-coach Phil Parkinson as United's new boss. Parkinson saved United from relegation certainty to 12th place, their highest position for 23 years. He brought in Sports Science and revolutionised the way players trained, ate and rested.

The 2003–04 season was almost a Cup campaign of its own. U's played a record 15 ties in progressing in the FA Cup and LDV Trophy. Helped by the astute signings of Wayne Andrews and Premiership youngsters Craig Fagan and Rowan Vine, United blazed a trail to the FA Cup fifth round defeating Oxford, Aldershot, Accrington Stanley and Coventry, courtesy of a Vine hat trick, before succumbing to Sheffield United by 1–0 at Bramall Lane in the fifth round.

The U's were then faced with the task of clawing back a 3–2 deficit from the LDV Vans Trophy Southern Final first leg at Steve Wignall's Southend. A 1–1 draw and a barrage of fixtures proved too much and United slipped from 5th to 14th whilst on the Cup trail, losing influential Karl Duguid to a serious knee injury. Nine points separated United and the play-offs at the end of the season.

West Brom became the last-ever top flight club to visit Layer Road on 21 September 2004. Colchester didn't disappoint winning the League Cup tie 2–1 to earn a trip to another Premiership side in Southampton, where United scared their lofty opponents before bowing out 3–2. League form was relatively poor with nine home defeats and just four wins in a 25-game mid season spell. No team managed to score more than two goals in the League against the U's but a mid-table spot was always on the cards. A tricky set of draws in the FA Cup had Colchester winning through their travels to Mansfield, Rushden & Diamonds and Hull, although the Mansfield tie required a replay, before being paired with Premiership Blackburn at Ewood Park, but lost 3–0.

With 15th place in 2004–05 season considered a backward step, U's fans became increasingly frustrated at Parkinson's 4–5–1 tactics at Layer Road. The season kick started with the arrival of his old Reading teammate Jamie Cureton on loan from Swindon. U's were in the top four by Christmas and their 12-match unbeaten run was halted at Swindon on Boxing Day. Parkinson's side simply embarked on another run of seven straight wins, 10 if Cup ties are included, and topped the table in January 2006. The FA Cup brought more success on and off the pitch. Leamington were thrashed 9–1 in the first round on 5 December 2005, equalling a 44-year club record. U's won at Shrewsbury and then beat Championship sides Sheffield United and Derby to set up a mouth watering tie at Chelsea.

The U's won just one in 13, including Cup ties, went seven out of eight League games in February without scoring and lost the top of the table clash with Southend by 3–0 at Layer Road. Wins at Bournemouth and at home to Rotherham meant United only had to secure a draw in the last match at Yeovil. Ironically United's first ever professional match in 1937 was in the Somerset town and they nervously held onto a 0–0 draw to gain promotion to The Coca-Cola Championship – three points behind Essex neighbours Southend.

The average gate of 3,969 was paltry compared to some of the sides that they would face but Parkinson had delivered U's ultimate dream. Chris Iwelumo's 19 goals and 15 by midfielder Neil Danns put both players in the shop window. Parkinson, however, resigned on 13 June 2006. Geraint Williams oversaw pre-season training and, after a lengthy recruitment process, was charged with the daunting task of leading United in their first season in the Championship. He employed Mick Harford as his assistant and the pair worked miracles for a club that was now owned by Robbie Cowling, a very successful local businessman.

United entertained Ipswich in the first League derby for 49 years and a Karl Duguid goal gave U's the victory they so dearly aspired to. Parkinson returned with his struggling Hull team in November 2006 and Iwelumo scored four and a share of the club record as United trounced The Tigers 5–1. Parkinson was sacked five days later whilst United recorded eight home wins on the spin to be in a play-off position by Christmas. Talk turned to sharing Portman Road if United reached the Premiership with Cuckoo Farm still to rise from the drawing board.

Reading paid a new record £2.5m for England U20s international Greg Halford, but the loss did not affect United too much as they continued to take playing against the likes of Leeds, Sunderland and Birmingham in their stride. Iwelumo netted an impressive 18 goals but Cureton went even better netting 24 times winning the Championship Golden Boot. Unbelievingly United were just one point off a play-off place with two games to go. Defeat at chief rivals Stoke ended their hopes but the 10th-placed finish was the highest in the club's history making them 30th in the entire Football League. Gates at Layer Road had risen to 5,466, the highest since 1970–71 with most games sold out, and, the first turf was cut at Cuckoo Farm.

Ahead of United's largely unexpected second season in the Championship Cureton, Iwelumo, Wayne Brown and Richard Garcia all left on a rather sour note in the summer. Cureton fetched £850,000 from Norwich prompting boss Williams to smash the club's own record by paying a reported £300,000 for MK Dons Clive Platt. On the same day he spent another six figure sum on Mark Yeates and news broke that England legend Teddy Sheringham would be donning a blue and white shirt.

Robbie Cowlings move from owner to chairman prompted an about turn where agents were concerned. He admitted that if Colchester were to compete then they would have to use agents. Peter Heard stepped down after 16 years as chairman to become life president.

Williams failed to find an adequate replacement for Brown and his defence leaked goals all season. Platt and Cureton's replacement Kevin Lisbie had no trouble scoring as United maintained their ability in the opponents' box. It was clear by Christmas that United would be in a relegation battle particularly after a dismal home defeat to Blackpool. Cowling made funds available during the January transfer window with Chris Coyne arriving for another record £300,000 with £250,000 spent on both Phil Ifil and Dean Hammond. They could have been relegated on 5 April 2008 but a 2–0 win over Ipswich ensured that it wouldn't be U's neighbours applying the final nail, although the inevitable happened four days later when, without playing, relegation was confirmed.

Layer Road hosted its last ever League game on 26 April 2008, just over 70 years after its first, when The U's lost 1–0 to a Stoke City side on its way to the Premier League. Chief Executive Marie Partner ceremonially locked the gates for the last time.

Life at the new stadium began with the announcement of a sponsorship deal that would see it being named The Weston Homes Community Stadium. The first-ever match was a reduced capacity ramp-up event against Spanish side Athletic Bilbao on 4 August 2008. Scott Vernon had the honour of scoring U's first goal at their new home as 5,610 watched a 2–1 defeat.

Fans favourite Karl Duguid left in the summer to pursue Championship football with Plymouth and Kevin Lisbie joined neighbours Ipswich for a reported £650,000 fee. Short on firepower manager Geraint Williams broke U's transfer record yet again bringing in Cheltenham's Steven Gillespie for £400,000. In order to iron out any teething problems United were granted permission by the Football League to play their first two games away from home and thus the first-ever League fixture came on 16 August against Huddersfield when a 0–0 draw was played out. Mark Yeates became the first U's scorer in a competitive match at WHCS when he bagged both goals in a 2–2 draw with Oldham on 30 August. United couldn't force a win at home and following a 3–0 home defeat to MK Dons that left United in the bottom four with a record of 1 League win from 6, Williams was relieved of his duties.

On 10 October 2008 former Wycombe manager Paul Lambert was unveiled as Colchester's new manager. He quickly inspired The U's to record their first home victory in a thumping 5–0 win over Carlisle 15 days later.

On 18 November 2008 the Stadium was rewarded with its first-ever international match when a Henri Lansbury goal gave England Under-19's a 1–0 win over their German counterparts in front of a record crowd of 9,692.

Lambert set to work bringing in several loan players including Marc Tierney, Jimmy Walker and Alan Maybury. A terrific run of 10 wins and four draws from 18 games earned Lambert the January Manager of the Month award as United rose to just 7 points off the play-offs. A new club record attendance was set in April when 9,559 watched one of those defeats by Leeds, but The U's fell back to finish in 12th position – 13 points off a Play-Off place. The U's had enjoyed their best-ever away season with 11 victories but endured their worst-ever home season with 12 defeats.

Lambert vowed he would have a mass clear out in the summer and called each player in one by one before May was out to tell them their fate. He had identified his targets and Robbie Cowling was willing to try and fund those wishes. In came David Fox, Ashley Vincent, Alan Maybury, Lee Beevers, Ben Williams and Magnus Okonghuae all on permanent deals with Mark Yeates, leading scorer in that first WHCS season, joining Middlesbrough for a reported £350,000, Chris Coyne leaving for Australia, Scott Vernon being touted as a transfer makeweight and John White, Jamie Guy, Matt Lockwood, Phil Ifil, Matt Heath and Johnnie Jackson feeling the backlash.

To add to its growing reputation the WHCS staged it second international on 16 July 2009 when England Ladies hosted Iceland Ladies before 4,170 fans.

Lambert saved his best transfer news until three days before the season opener at Norwich when he secured U's old boy Kevin Lisbie on a season-long loan after the striker refused to move to within 30 minutes of Ipswich as demanded by Town manager Roy Keane. Lisbie responded in magnificent fashion as United walloped their Norfolk neighbours in a truly sensational 7–1 thrashing at Carrow Road. A week later U's confirmed top spot in League One with a 2–1 win over Yeovil but amazingly Norwich contacted Robbie Cowling after the game wanting to appoint Lambert as their new manager following their sacking of 7–1 fall-guy Bryan Gunn. Cowling refused at first, but then relented when it became clear Lambert's mind was made up despite no official approach by Norwich. He offered Lambert the chance to talk to Norwich on the proviso that no position could be accepted until compensation was discussed and agreed between the two clubs. Compensation was never agreed and so Lambert resigned, on a match day with U's due to host Gillingham, taking assistant Ian Culverhouse and Gary Karsa with him, both of whom resigned the day after Lambert's appointment.

Robbie Cowling and Steve Bradshaw both came out fighting vowing to take Norwich to a Football League tribunal and declaring that the next U's manager would be of Premier League quality and better than Lambert. They did not go against their words as former Watford boss Aidy Boothroyd was unveiled on 3 September 2009. Boothroyd's U's banished the home hoodoo with 7 wins from 8 League games to the end of the year and he enjoyed 9 games without defeat after his appointment. He signed John-Joe O'Toole, Kayode Odejayi and Danny Batth on loan with the first named pair agreeing to join permanently ahead of the January transfer window. With the Lambert compensation saga set to run on and on, Robbie Cowling refused Norwich fans additional tickets over and above their normal allocation for the return match in January 2010 saying he would rather have an empty seat than one occupied by extra City fans. The decade ended with United consolidated in a promising top four position after a 2–1 home win over Southampton in front of 8,514.

== 2010–present ==
On 20 May 2010, manager Aidy Boothroyd left Colchester to join Coventry City as manager. Colchester appointed former Cheltenham Town and Carlisle United manager John Ward as his replacement on 31 May 2010. In both the 2010–11 and 2011–12 seasons, Colchester finished in 10th place in League One. The 2012–13 season started poorly, with just no wins from their first nine games. As a result, on 24 September 2012, they sacked John Ward and appointed Joe Dunne as his replacement. They defeated Carlisle United 2–0 on the final day of the season to ensure that they remained in League One. The club then finished the 2013–14 season in 16th position.

Following a poor start to the 2014–15 season, manager Joe Dunne left Colchester by mutual consent and they appointed academy manager Tony Humes as his replacement. Colchester secured League One safety on the final day of the season when they beat promotion hopefuls Preston North End 1–0 on 3 May 2015. On 26 November 2015, Colchester manager Tony Humes was sacked following a run of one win in nine matches, with Richard Hall and John McGreal placed in temporary charge of the club. Following a 5–1 defeat to Burton Albion, Wayne Brown was appointed as caretaker manager, with John McGreal assisting him. On 21 December 2015, Colchester appointed Kevin Keen as their new manager. However, Colchester could not stave off relegation to League Two in the 2015–16 season as they finished the campaign in 23rd position, confining them to the fourth tier of English football for the first time in 18 years. Manager Kevin Keen left the club by mutual consent three days later, with David Wright appointed as caretaker manager for the penultimate match. John McGreal was appointed as permanent manager ahead of the final game of the season. In the 2016–17 season, Colchester finished 8th in League Two, one point below the play-off places. Colchester finished 13th in the 2017–18 season before finishing 8th in 2018–19. In the 2019–20 EFL Cup, Colchester defeated Premier League side Tottenham Hotspur on penalties. Colchester were eventually eliminated by Manchester United in the quarter-finals, losing 3–0 at Old Trafford.

== See also ==
- List of Colchester United F.C. seasons, for a statistical breakdown by season
