= 1970–71 Carlisle United F.C. season =

Carlisle United F.C.
1970–71 season
- Manager: Ian MacFarlane
- Stadium: Brunton Park
- Second Division: 4th
- FA Cup: Fourth Round
- League Cup: Fourth Round

For the 1970–71 English football season, Carlisle United F.C. competed in Football League Division Two.

== Results & fixtures ==
=== Football League Second Division ===
==== League table ====
Pos	Team	Pld	W	D	L	GF	GA	GAv	Pts	Qualification or relegation
2	Sheffield United (P)	42	21	14	7	73	39	1.872	56	Promotion to the First Division
3	Cardiff City	42	20	13	9	64	41	1.561	53	Qualification for the Cup Winners' Cup first round
4	Carlisle United	42	20	13	9	65	43	1.512	53	Qualification for the Watney Cup
5	Hull City	42	19	13	10	54	41	1.317	51	
6	Luton Town	42	18	13	11	62	43	1.442	49	Qualification for the Watney Cup

Rules for classification: 1) Points; 2) Goal average; 3) Goals scored
(P) Promoted

==== Matches ====
Match Day	Date	Opponent	H/A	Score	Carlisle United Scorer(s)	Attendance
1	15 August	Middlesbrough	A	1–2		
2	22 August	Birmingham City	H	0–3		
3	29 August	Leicester City	A	2–2		
4	1 September	Hull City	H	2–0		
5	5 September	Orient	H	2–0		
6	12 September	Watford	A	0–0		
7	19 September	Swindon Town	H	2–1		
8	26 September	Sheffield Wednesday	A	0–3		
9	29 September	Charlton Athletic	A	1–1		
10	2 October	Millwall	H	3–0		
11	10 October	Norwich City	A	1–1		
12	17 October	Middlesbrough	H	1–0		
13	20 October	Sunderland	H	0–0		
14	24 October	Cardiff City	H	1–1		
15	31 October	Sheffield United	A	2–2		
16	7 November	Oxford United	H	3–2		
17	14 November	Luton Town	A	3–3		
18	21 November	Blackburn Rovers	H	1–0		
19	28 November	Bristol City	A	1–2		
20	5 December	Portsmouth	H	6–0		
21	12 December	Queen's Park Rangers	A	1–1		
22	19 December	Birmingham City	A	0–1		
23	26 December	Bolton Wanderers	H	1–0		
24	9 January	Charlton Athletic	H	1–1		
25	16 January	Sunderland	A	0–2		
26	30 January	Bristol City	H	2–1		
27	6 February	Portsmouth	A	4–1		
28	13 February	Queen's Park Rangers	H	3–0		
29	20 February	Blackburn Rovers	A	2–0		
30	27 February	Sheffield United	H	1–0		
31	6 March	Cardiff City	A	0–4		
32	13 March	Luton Town	H	1–0		
33	20 March	Oxford United	A	1–1		
34	27 March	Orient	A	1–1		
35	3 April	Leicester City	H	0–1		
36	5 April	Millwall	A	1–2		
37	10 April	Bolton Wanderers	A	3–0		
38	13 April	Watford	H	2–1		
39	17 April	Norwich City	H	4–2		
40	24 April	Swindon Town	A	0–0		
41	28 April	Hull City	A	2–1		
42	1 May	Sheffield Wednesday	H	3–0		

=== Football League Cup ===
Round	Date	Opponent	H/A	Score	Carlisle United Scorer(s)	Attendance
R2	9 September	Manchester City	H	2–1		
R3	6 October	Oxford United	H	3–1		
R4	28 October	Aston Villa	A	0–1		

=== FA Cup ===
Round	Date	Opponent	H/A	Score	Carlisle United Scorer(s)	Attendance
R3	11 January	Southend United	A	3–0		
R4	23 January	Tottenham Hotspur	H	2–3		
