= Trevor Painter =

Trevor Painter may refer to:

- Trevor Painter (footballer)
- Trevor Painter (coach)
