= 1961–62 Football League First Division =

1961–62 season of Football League First Division

First Division
- Season: 1961–62
- Champions: Ipswich Town; 1st English title
- Relegated: Cardiff City; Chelsea
- European Cup: Ipswich Town
- European Cup Winners' Cup: Tottenham Hotspur
- Inter-Cities Fairs Cup: Everton
- Matches: 462
- Goals: 1,582 (3.42 per match)
- Top goalscorer: Derek Kevan; Ray Crawford (33 goals each)

Statistics of Football League First Division in the 1961-62 season.

== Overview ==
Ipswich Town won their only league title this season, notably being the only team in England to win the title in their first ever season in the top flight (not counting inaugural league champions Preston North End in 1888–89).

== League standings ==
Pos	Team	Pld	W	D	L	GF	GA	GAv	Pts	Qualification or relegation
1	Ipswich Town (C)	42	24	8	10	93	67	1.388	56	Qualified for the European Cup
2	Burnley	42	21	11	10	101	67	1.507	53	
3	Tottenham Hotspur	42	21	10	11	88	69	1.275	52	Qualified for the Cup Winners' Cup
4	Everton	42	20	11	11	88	54	1.630	51	Invited for the Inter-Cities Fairs Cup
5	Sheffield United	42	19	9	14	61	69	0.884	47	
6	Sheffield Wednesday	42	20	6	16	72	58	1.241	46	
7	Aston Villa	42	18	8	16	65	56	1.161	44	
8	West Ham United	42	17	10	15	76	82	0.927	44	
9	West Bromwich Albion	42	15	13	14	83	67	1.239	43	
10	Arsenal	42	16	11	15	71	72	0.986	43	
11	Bolton Wanderers	42	16	10	16	62	66	0.939	42	
12	Manchester City	42	17	7	18	78	81	0.963	41	
13	Blackpool	42	15	11	16	70	75	0.933	41	
14	Leicester City	42	17	6	19	72	71	1.014	40	
15	Manchester United	42	15	9	18	72	75	0.960	39	
16	Blackburn Rovers	42	14	11	17	50	58	0.862	39	
17	Birmingham City	42	14	10	18	65	81	0.802	38	
18	Wolverhampton Wanderers	42	13	10	19	73	86	0.849	36	
19	Nottingham Forest	42	13	10	19	63	79	0.797	36	
20	Fulham	42	13	7	22	66	74	0.892	33	
21	Cardiff City (R)	42	9	14	19	50	81	0.617	32	Relegated to the Second Division
22	Chelsea (R)	42	9	10	23	63	94	0.670	28	Relegated to the Second Division

Source: World Football
Rules for classification: 1) Points; 2) Goal average; 3) Goals scored
(C) Champions; (R) Relegated

== Results ==
Home \ Away	ARS	AST	BIR	BLB	BLP	BOL	BUR	CAR	CHE	EVE	FUL	IPS	LEI	MCI	MUN	NOT	SHU	SHW	TOT	WBA	WHU	WOL
Arsenal		4–5	1–1	0–0	3–0	1–2	2–2	1–1	0–3	2–3	1–0	0–3	4–4	3–0	5–1	2–1	2–0	1–0	2–1	0–1	2–2	3–1
Aston Villa	3–1		1–3	1–0	5–0	3–0	0–2	2–2	3–1	1–1	2–0	3–0	8–3	2–1	1–1	5–1	0–0	1–0	0–0	1–0	2–4	1–0
Birmingham City	1–0	0–2		2–1	1–1	2–1	2–6	3–0	3–2	0–0	2–1	3–1	1–5	1–1	1–1	1–1	3–0	1–1	2–3	1–2	4–0	3–6
Blackburn Rovers	0–0	4–2	2–0		1–1	2–3	2–1	0–0	3–0	1–1	0–2	2–2	2–1	4–1	3–0	2–1	1–2	0–2	0–1	1–1	1–0	2–1
Blackpool	0–1	1–2	1–0	2–1		2–1	1–1	3–0	4–0	1–1	2–1	1–1	2–1	3–1	2–3	1–3	2–4	1–3	1–2	2–2	2–0	7–2
Bolton Wanderers	2–1	1–1	3–2	1–1	0–0		0–0	1–1	4–2	1–1	2–3	0–0	1–0	0–2	1–0	6–1	2–0	4–3	1–2	3–2	1–0	1–0
Burnley	0–2	3–0	7–1	0–1	2–0	3–1		2–1	1–1	2–1	2–1	4–3	2–0	6–3	1–3	0–0	4–2	4–0	2–2	3–1	6–0	3–3
Cardiff City	1–1	1–0	3–2	1–1	3–2	1–2	1–1		5–2	0–0	0–3	0–3	0–4	0–0	1–2	2–2	1–1	2–1	1–1	2–2	3–0	2–3
Chelsea	2–3	1–0	1–1	1–1	1–0	1–0	1–2	2–3		1–1	0–0	2–2	1–3	1–1	2–0	2–2	6–1	1–0	0–2	4–1	0–1	4–5
Everton	4–1	2–0	4–1	1–0	2–2	1–0	2–2	8–3	4–0		3–0	5–2	3–2	0–2	5–1	6–0	1–0	0–4	3–0	3–1	3–0	4–0
Fulham	5–2	3–1	0–1	2–0	0–1	2–2	3–5	0–1	3–4	2–1		1–2	2–1	3–4	2–0	1–1	5–2	0–2	1–1	1–2	2–0	0–1
Ipswich Town	2–2	2–0	4–1	2–1	1–1	2–1	6–2	1–0	5–2	4–2	2–4		1–0	2–4	4–1	1–0	4–0	2–1	3–2	3–0	4–2	3–2
Leicester City	0–1	0–2	1–2	2–0	0–2	1–1	2–6	3–0	2–0	2–0	4–1	0–2		2–0	4–3	2–1	4–1	1–0	2–3	1–0	2–2	3–0
Manchester City	3–2	1–0	1–4	3–1	2–4	2–1	1–3	1–2	2–2	1–3	2–1	3–0	3–1		0–2	3–0	1–1	3–1	6–2	3–1	3–5	2–2
Manchester United	2–3	2–0	0–2	6–1	0–1	0–3	1–4	3–0	3–2	1–1	3–0	5–0	2–2	3–2		6–3	0–1	1–1	1–0	4–1	1–2	0–2
Nottingham Forest	0–1	2–0	2–1	1–2	3–4	0–1	3–2	2–1	3–0	2–1	1–1	1–1	0–0	1–2	1–0		2–0	3–1	2–0	4–4	3–0	3–1
Sheffield United	2–1	0–2	3–1	0–0	2–1	3–1	2–0	1–0	3–1	1–1	2–2	2–1	3–1	3–1	2–3	2–0		1–0	1–1	1–1	1–4	2–1
Sheffield Wednesday	1–1	3–0	5–1	1–0	3–2	4–2	4–0	2–0	5–3	3–1	1–1	1–4	1–2	1–0	3–1	3–0	1–2		0–0	2–1	0–0	3–2
Tottenham Hotspur	4–3	1–0	3–1	4–1	5–2	2–2	4–2	3–2	5–2	3–1	4–2	1–3	1–2	2–0	2–2	4–2	3–3	4–0		1–2	2–2	1–0
West Bromwich Albion	4–0	1–1	0–0	4–0	7–1	6–2	1–1	5–1	4–0	2–0	2–0	1–3	2–0	2–2	1–1	2–2	3–1	0–2	2–4		0–1	1–1
West Ham United	3–3	2–0	2–2	2–3	2–2	1–0	2–1	4–1	2–1	3–1	4–2	2–2	4–1	0–4	1–1	3–2	1–2	2–3	2–1	3–3		4–2
Wolverhampton Wanderers	2–3	2–2	2–1	0–2	2–2	5–1	1–1	1–1	1–1	0–3	1–3	2–0	1–1	4–1	2–2	2–1	0–1	3–0	3–1	1–5	3–2	

Updated to match(es) played on unknown. Source: Ian Laschke: Rothmans Book of Football League Records 1888–89 to 1978–79. Macdonald and Jane’s, London & Sydney, 1980.
Legend: Blue = home team win; Yellow = draw; Red = away team win.

== Top scorers ==
Rank	Player	Club	Goals
1	Derek Kevan	West Bromwich Albion	33
=	Ray Crawford	Ipswich Town	33
2	Ray Charnley	Blackpool	30
3	Ted Phillips	Ipswich Town	28
4	Roy Vernon	Everton	26
5	Ray Pointer	Burnley	25
