= Trevor Painter (footballer) =

English footballer

Personal information
- Full name: Trevor Alfred Painter
- Date of birth: 2 July 1949
- Place of birth: Norwich, England
- Date of death: 9 April 2012 (aged 62)
- Place of death: Drayton, Norfolk, England
- Height: 5 ft 11 in (1.80 m)
- Position: Defender

Youth career
- 1966–1967: Norwich City

Senior career*
Years	Team	Apps	(Gls)
1967–1970	Norwich City	2	(0)
1970–1971	Colchester United	1	(0)
1971–1974	King's Lynn		
- Lowestoft Town
Total		3	(0)
- * Club domestic league appearances and goals

Trevor Alfred Painter (2 July 1949 – 9 April 2012) was an English footballer who played in the Football League as a defender for Norwich City and Colchester United.

== Career ==
Born in Norwich, Painter had initially trialled at Ipswich Town but signed as an apprentice with Norwich City in May 1966. He was captain of both Norwich and Norfolk boys teams and made 103 reserve team appearances, but could only muster two Football League appearances between turning professional in 1967 and signing for Colchester United in 1970.

Colchester manager Dick Graham signed Painter in April 1970, but he did not make his first (and only) appearance until December of the same year. The game was a 1–0 defeat at Layer Road to Chester City on 18 December.

He was released by Colchester at the end of the 1970–71 season, joining King's Lynn and spending three years with the club. He later joined Lowestoft Town but rarely featured. He became an insurance worker in Norwich following his full-time football career.

Painter died in Drayton, Norfolk, in 2012 at the age of 62.
