= Enoch Gilchrist =

Scottish footballer

Personal information
- Full name: Enoch Skidmore Gilchrist
- Date of birth: 25 December 1940
- Place of birth: Wishaw, Scotland
- Date of death: 2008 (aged 67–68)
- Position: Wing half

Senior career*
Years	Team	Apps	(Gls)
- Cumnock
1961–1966	Berwick Rangers	80	(4)
1965–1967	Wishaw		
1967–1970	Hamilton Academical	94	(22)
1970–1971	Dumbarton		
1971–1974	Hamilton Croatia		
- * Club domestic league appearances and goals

Enoch Skidmore Gilchrist (25 December 1940 – 2008) was a Scottish footballer, who played for Berwick Rangers, Hamilton Academical and Dumbarton.

In 1971, he played abroad in Canada's National Soccer League with Hamilton Croatia, and returned for the 1972 season. He re-signed with Hamilton for the 1973 season, and for the 1974 season.

His elder brother John was also a footballer.
