= Mick Mahon =

English footballer (born 1944)

Personal information
- Full name: Michael John Mahon
- Date of birth: 17 September 1944 (age 82)
- Place of birth: Manchester, England
- Position: Winger

Youth career
- Newcastle United
- Loughborough College

Senior career*
Years	Team	Apps	(Gls)
196?–196?	North Shields		
196?–1966	Loughborough United		
1966–1969	Port Vale	91	(21)
1969–1970	York City	29	(10)
1970–1973	Colchester United	136	(26)
1973–197?	Wimbledon		
Total		256+	(57+)
- * Club domestic league appearances and goals

Michael John Mahon (born 17 September 1944) is an English former footballer who played as a winger. He scored 57 goals in 256 league games during a six-year career in the English Football League.

A former North Shields and Loughborough United player, he turned professional with Port Vale in 1967. He spent two years with the club before joining York City for the 1969–70 season. Following this he spent three years with Colchester United before moving to non-League Wimbledon in 1973, despite having been voted Colchester's Player of the Year and helping the club to win the Watney Cup. He made FA Cup history with the "Dons" in 1975 when he scored the winning goal to knock top-flight Burnley out of the competition.

== Career ==
Mahon started his career with North Shields and Loughborough United before joining Port Vale as an amateur in May 1966. He became a regular in the first-team after Jackie Mudie handed him his debut at Vale Park in a 2–1 win over Southport on 20 August 1966, before losing his place in March 1967. His seven goals in 28 games in 1966–67 were enough to win him a professional contract at the Fourth Division club in April 1967. After nine goals in 24 games under Stanley Matthews in 1967–68 and six goals in 37 games under Gordon Lee in 1968–69, he was handed a free transfer to league rivals York City in May 1969.

Having scored 10 goals in 29 league games under Tom Johnston in 1969–70, Mahon moved on to fellow Fourth Division club Colchester United in August 1970. He was a member of Dick Graham's team that knocked Leeds United out of the FA Cup in 1971. He scored seven goals in 47 appearances in 1970–71, and scored 12 goals in 49 games in 1971–72, including two in the Watney Cup final victory over West Bromwich Albion. Mahon finished as the club's top scorer and Player of the Year under Jim Smith in 1972–73 with 12 goals in 48 games. He played 158 games for the "U's" in all competitions, scoring 33 goals, before joining Wimbledon for a £1,500 fee in December 1973. He was a member of the Wimbledon side that beat Burnley in the third round of the FA Cup in 1975, and he scored the winning goal in their 1–0 victory. It was the first time in more than fifty years a non-League side had beaten a top-flight side away from home in the FA Cup.

== Post-retirement ==
Once retiring from the game, Mahon became a school examination officer. During the late 1970s 1980s taught as PE teacher at Phillip Morant & St. Benedicts School, Colchester, both a short distance from Layer Road ground.

== Career statistics ==
Appearances and goals by club, season and competition
Club	Season	League			FA Cup		League Cup		Total	
Club	Season	Division	Apps	Goals	Apps	Goals	Apps	Goals	Apps	Goals
Port Vale	1966–67	Fourth Division	26	7	1	0	1	0	28	7
Port Vale	1967–68	Fourth Division	32	9	1	0	1	0	34	9
Port Vale	1968–69	Fourth Division	33	5	3	1	1	0	37	6
Port Vale	Total		91	21	5	1	3	0	99	22
York City	1969–70	Fourth Division	29	10	3	1	1	0	33	11
Colchester United	1970–71	Fourth Division	38	5	7	2	2	0	47	7
Colchester United	1971–72	Fourth Division	42	9	1	0	6	4	49	13
Colchester United	1972–73	Fourth Division	44	12	3	0	1	0	48	12
Colchester United	1973–74	Fourth Division	12	0	1	1	1	0	14	1
Colchester United	Total		136	26	12	3	10	4	158	33
Career total			256	57	20	5	14	4	290	66

== Honours ==
Colchester United

- Watney Cup: 1972

Wimbledon

- Southern Football League: 1974–75, 1975–76

Individual

- Colchester United Player of the Year: 1973
- Colchester United Hall of Fame
