= Dick Graham =

English footballer (1922–2013)

Personal information
- Full name: Richard D. Graham
- Date of birth: 6 May 1922
- Place of birth: Corby, England
- Date of death: 7 March 2013 (aged 90)
- Place of death: Colchester, England
- Position: Goalkeeper

Senior career*
Years	Team	Apps	(Gls)
- Northampton Town
- Leicester City
- Southport (guest)
- Crewe Alexandra (guest)
- Crystal Palace (guest)
1944–1946	Leicester City		
1946–1951	Crystal Palace	155	(0)
Total		155	(0)

Managerial career
- 1963–1966: Crystal Palace
- 1966–1968: Leyton Orient
- 1968: Walsall
- 1968–1972: Colchester United
- 1973–1974: Wimbledon
- * Club domestic league appearances and goals

Richard D. Graham (6 May 1922 – 7 March 2013) was an English footballer and football manager who played and coached in the Football League. He played as a goalkeeper for Crystal Palace, making over 150 league appearances.

He went on to manage his former club, Crystal Palace, between 1963 and 1966. He would go on to manage Leyton Orient and Walsall. His greatest success came with Colchester United, most notably by defeating Don Revie's Leeds United 3–2 in an FA Cup fifth-round tie in February 1971, which was one of the biggest FA Cup shocks in the history of the competition. He also won the Watney Cup with Colchester, before resigning in 1972. He later managed Wimbledon between 1973 and 1974.

== Playing career ==
Born in Corby, Graham played at the age of 14 for Corby Town and as an amateur for Northampton Town prior to joining Crystal Palace from Leicester City. He joined Palace following appearances as a guest-player during the war years. He was serving in the RAF during these initial appearances, before signing permanently in 1946. He made 155 league appearances for the club, before announcing his retirement through injury.

== Managerial career ==
Following his retirement from playing, Graham had roles as coach at West Bromwich Albion and assistant to Bob Stokoe at Charlton Athletic prior to joining Crystal Palace as assistant manager. He was named permanent manager in November 1962, succeeding Arthur Rowe. Graham led the club to 11th position in the Third Division in his first season, and the following season achieved promotion to the Second Division. He departed Selhurst Park in January 1966.

In the summer of 1966, Graham was appointed manager of Leyton Orient. His time with Orient was not a success, with the club hovering over the relegation zone. He resigned in February 1968 following the club's refusal to invest in new players. He then joined Walsall in March of the same year, replacing Ray Shaw, but could not guide the Saddlers to promotion, leaving the club two months later at the end of the season.

On 1 June 1968, Graham became manager of Fourth Division club Colchester United. As manager of the U's, he took charge of 216 games for the club, winning 92 and drawing 52.

Graham is best remembered at Colchester for an FA Cup run in 1970–71, in which his team saw off Ringmer, Cambridge United, Barnet and Rochdale to reach the fifth-round. Colchester were drawn against First Division club Leeds United, managed by Don Revie on 13 February 1971. The U's side, nicknamed 'Grandad's Army' or 'Graham's Grandad's', stormed to a 3–0 lead with two goals from Ray Crawford and one from Dave Simmons. Leeds fought back, with goals from Norman Hunter and Johnny Giles, but Colchester held on to win 3–2. The win for Colchester was one of the biggest FA Cup shocks in the competition's history, earning the club a place in the quarter-finals. The U's faced Everton in the sixth round, but lost 5–0 at Goodison Park.

In the summer of 1971, the U's took part in the Watney Cup, a short-lived pre-season knock-out tournament for the highest goalscoring teams not promoted. Knocking out Luton Town and Carlisle United, United faced West Bromwich Albion in the final at The Hawthorns. Colchester held West Brom 4–4, with the tie going to a penalty shoot-out, the first penalty shoot-out to be shown on television. The U's won with Phil Bloss slotting home the winning penalty.

Graham resigned from Colchester United following a disagreement with a shareholder in September 1972, ending nine years of Football League management. His Football League managerial record consisted of 365 games, 170 wins, 117 draws and 131 defeats.

In 1973, Graham took charge of Wimbledon. While the club ran as a part-time outfit, he worked in the supermarket business before quitting when Wimbledon went full-time. The club reverted to part-time just three weeks later, to the displeasure of Graham. He resigned from the club in March 1974 after just one season, claiming interference from the directors.

== Managerial statistics ==
Managerial record by team and tenure
Team	From	To	Record				
Team	From	To	P	W	D	L	Win %
Crystal Palace	1 March 1963	1 January 1966	144	65	40	39	45.1
Leyton Orient	1 June 1966	1 February 1968	80	24	27	29	30.0
Walsall	1 March 1968	1 May 1968	15	6	4	5	40.0
Colchester United	1 June 1968	7 September 1972	215	91	52	72	42.3
Wimbledon	18 August 1973	16 March 1974	45	16	14	15	35.6
Total			499	202	137	160	40.5

All statistics referenced by:

== Personal life ==
After being to forced to retire from playing through injury, Graham took over a pub in Croydon, becoming a brewer's representative and part-time reporter alongside coaching with the Surrey FA. His brother played as a centre-forward for Clapton Orient, Nottingham Forest and York City.

Graham was inducted into the Colchester United 'Hall of Fame' in 2007 in recognition of the famous FA Cup victory over Leeds, becoming the first manager to be elected without having ever played for the club.

== Death ==
Graham fractured his hip in December 2012, from which he slowly recovered in hospital, but an underlying heart condition worsened following his return home. This led to him being confined to bed for the last three weeks of his life. He died aged 90 on 7 March 2013.

== Honours ==
Colchester United

- 1971 Watney Cup winner (as manager)

All honours referenced by:
