= Derek Kevan =

English footballer (1935–2013)

Personal information
- Full name: Derek Tennyson Kevan
- Date of birth: 6 March 1935
- Place of birth: Ripon, England
- Date of death: 4 January 2013 (aged 77)
- Place of death: Birmingham, England
- Position: Centre forward

Senior career*
Years	Team	Apps	(Gls)
1952–1953	Bradford Park Avenue	15	(8)
1953–1963	West Bromwich Albion	262	(157)
1963	Chelsea	7	(1)
1963–1965	Manchester City	67	(48)
1965–1966	Crystal Palace	21	(5)
1966	Peterborough United	17	(2)
1966–1967	Luton Town	11	(4)
1967–1968	Stockport County	40	(10)
1968	Macclesfield Town	4	(4)
1968	Boston United	2	(0)
1968–1969	Stourbridge		
1969–1970	Ansells		
Total		448	(239)

International career
1957–1961	England	14	(8)
- * Club domestic league appearances and goals

Derek Tennyson Kevan (6 March 1935 – 4 January 2013) was an English footballer. He spent the majority of his club career playing as a centre-forward for West Bromwich Albion, where he earned the nickname "The Tank". In 1961–62 he was the joint leading scorer in Division One – alongside Ray Crawford of Ipswich Town – with 33 goals. He also won 14 caps for the England national team, scoring a total of eight goals, including two in the 1958 FIFA World Cup Finals.

== Club career ==
Kevan was born in Ripon. His father Albert, formerly an officer in the Royal Marines, worked as a pipe-layer. Kevan started his career in his native Yorkshire with Bradford Park Avenue. Kevan was the first signing made by the former Tottenham Hotspur full-back Vic Buckingham after he had taken over from Jesse Carver as manager of West Bromwich Albion in February 1953. Signed for £2,000, Kevan completed his National Service in the Army before establishing himself full-time at The Hawthorns.

Coached by the club's former striker W. G. Richardson, Kevan had to wait until August 1955 to make his West Bromwich Albion League debut, a 2–0 home win over Everton in which he scored twice after being selected in place of the injured Ronnie Allen. He became a regular in the first team during the 1956–57 season, and his committed and powerful style of play earned him the nickname "The Tank" from the Albion supporters.

Kevan scored 20 goals in the 1956–57 season, which included a run to the FA Cup semi-finals where Albion lost to Aston Villa. He scored 80 goals over the next three seasons – 23 in 1957–58, 28 in 1958–59 and 29 in 1959–60, including five in a 6–2 home League win over Everton. He added 18 in 1960–61 and then claimed 33 League goals the following season, when he finished joint top scorer in the First Division with Ipswich Town's Ray Crawford. This remains the highest post-war League total by an Albion player.

In March 1963, after scoring 16 goals in 28 appearances that season, including four against Fulham, Kevan was transferred to Chelsea for £50,000. In a decade at Albion, he had scored 173 goals in 291 games. His spell at Stamford Bridge under Tommy Docherty was short and unsuccessful, and in the close season of the same year he moved to Manchester City for £35,000 just after their relegation to the Second Division.

Kevan made his Manchester City debut on the opening day of the 1963–64 season against Portsmouth, and scored his first goal for the club four days later, at Cardiff. Following the arrival of Jimmy Murray from Wolves in November, he and Kevan formed a productive strike partnership. From late November to the end of December, Kevan scored in eight consecutive matches. This included a run of six league games in which Murray and Kevan scored 21 goals between them. Kevan's goals also helped Manchester City to the semi-finals of the League Cup, a run in which Kevan scored in every round. Kevan finished the season as the club's leading goalscorer with 36 goals, 30 of them in the league, although City missed out on promotion.

Kevan continued to score regularly in the 1964–65 season. His goals included a first half hat-trick at Preston North End. However, his season was curtailed when he suffered a knee injury in a match at Derby County on 30 January. This proved to be his last match for Manchester City, who again missed out on promotion, and on 29 July 1965 he moved to Crystal Palace. In total Kevan scored 56 goals in all competitions in 76 appearances for the Maine Road club.

Brief spells at several lower league clubs followed. At Crystal Palace he made 21 League appearances and scored five goals before moving to Peterborough United in March 1966, and then Luton Town. In March 1967, Kevan joined Stockport County, in an exchange deal involving Keith Allen. At Stockport, he gained the first medal of his career, the Fourth Division title in 1967. After winding down his career in non-League football, he was the landlord of the Moss Rose pub, adjacent to Macclesfield Town's ground of the same name. He also worked as a delivery driver before returning to The Hawthorns in 1983 to work as a lottery agent as well as playing for the Albion All Stars charity team, which he later managed.

Kevan died on 4 January 2013 aged 77, leaving a wife, Connie. In tribute to Kevan, West Bromwich Albion players wore black armbands for their FA Cup match the day after his death.

== International career ==
Kevan scored eight goals in 14 appearances for England. He scored on his debut against Scotland at Wembley in a 2–1 win in April 1957, and netted twice in the 1958 World Cup Finals in Sweden, against the Soviet Union and Austria, after he was selected for the squad in preference to Brian Clough. His last England appearance came against Mexico in 1961. He also gained under-23 honours and netted a hat-trick for the Football League against the Scottish League in 1958.
