= Murray Brodie =

Scottish footballer

Personal information
- Date of birth: 26 September 1950 (age 76)
- Place of birth: Glasgow, Scotland
- Height: 6 ft 0 in (1.83 m)
- Position: Midfielder

Youth career
- Cumbernauld United

Senior career*
Years	Team	Apps	(Gls)
1969–1970	Leicester City	3	(2)
1970–1983	Aldershot	460	(84)
- Basingstoke Town
Total		463	(86)
- * Club domestic league appearances and goals

Murray Brodie (born 26 September 1950) is a Scottish former professional footballer who played as a midfielder, making over 400 career appearances.

== Career ==
Born in Glasgow, Brodie played for Cumbernauld United, Leicester City, Aldershot and Basingstoke Town.
