= John Gilchrist (footballer, born 1939) =

Scottish footballer

Personal information
- Full name: John Skidmore Gilchrist
- Date of birth: 5 September 1939
- Place of birth: Wishaw, Scotland
- Date of death: 13 August 1991 (aged 51)
- Place of death: Westminster, England
- Position: Right back

Senior career*
Years	Team	Apps	(Gls)
- Bellshill Athletic
1959–1960	Airdrieonians	3	(0)
1960–1969	Millwall	279	(10)
1969–1970	Fulham	23	(1)
1970–1972	Colchester United	41	(1)
- Tonbridge Angels
Total		346	(12)

Managerial career
- Tonbridge Angels
- * Club domestic league appearances and goals

John Skidmore Gilchrist (5 September 1939 – 13 August 1991) was a Scottish footballer who played as a right back in the Football League.

== Career ==
Born in Wishaw, Scotland, Gilchrist played for Millwall between 1960 and 1969 making just under 300 appearances. He also played for Fulham and Colchester United in the Football League.

His younger brother Enoch was also a footballer.

== Honours ==
=== Club ===
Millwall

- Football League Fourth Division: 1961–62

Colchester United

- Watney Cup: 1971
