= Bobby Ross (footballer, born 1941) =

Scottish footballer (1941–2022)

Personal information
- Full name: Robert Cochrane Ross
- Date of birth: 9 September 1941
- Place of birth: Edinburgh, Scotland
- Date of death: 28 May 2022 (aged 80)
- Place of death: Grimsby, England
- Height: 5 ft 8 in (1.73 m)
- Position: Midfielder

Senior career*
Years	Team	Apps	(Gls)
1958–1959	Arniston Rangers		
1959–1962	East Fife		
1962–1965	St Mirren		
1965–1971	Grimsby Town	212	(18)
1971–197?	Gainsborough Trinity		
- * Club domestic league appearances and goals

Robert Cochrane Ross (9 September 1941 – 28 May 2022) was a Scottish professional footballer who played as a midfielder.

== Early and personal life ==
Ross was from Edinburgh. He grew up in a working-class family of miners and expected to follow in their footsteps before discovering his talent for football. He moved to Lincolnshire for his career where he lived until his death.

== Football career ==
Beginning his career in Scotland he played for Arniston Rangers, East Fife and St Mirren before a notable six-year spell with Grimsby Town. He finished his career with non-league side Gainsborough Trinity.

== Death ==
Ross died at Diana Princess of Wales Hospital in Grimsby, on 28 May 2022, aged 80.
