= Tony Woolmer =

English footballer

Personal information
- Full name: Tony Woolmer
- Date of birth: 25 March 1946 (age 80)
- Place of birth: Norwich, England
- Position: Forward

Senior career*
Years	Team	Apps	(Gls)
1966–1968	Norwich City	5	(1)
1968–1970	Bradford Park Avenue	30	(7)
1970–1972	Scunthorpe United	40	(3)
- King's Lynn
Total		75	(11)
- * Club domestic league appearances and goals

Tony Woolmer (born 25 March 1946) is an English former footballer who played in the Football League for Norwich City, Bradford Park Avenue and Scunthorpe United.
