= Graham Smith (footballer, born 1947) =

English footballer

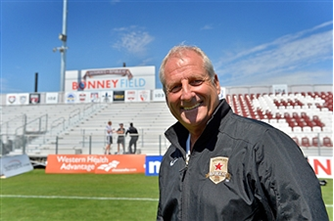

Personal information
- Full name: Graham William Charles Smith
- Date of birth: 2 November 1947 (age 78)
- Place of birth: Liverpool, England
- Position: Goalkeeper

Youth career
- 1967–1968: Loughborough College
- Liverpool FC (A Team)
- England (under 18's)

Senior career*
Years	Team	Apps	(Gls)
1968–1969	Notts County	10	(0)
1969–1972	Colchester United	95	(0)
1972–1973	West Bromwich Albion	10	(0)
1973–1976	Cambridge United	85	(0)
- Wigan Athletic
Total		200	(0)

Managerial career
- 2007–2009: Ventura County Fusion
- 2013–2017: Sacramento Republic (Director of Football)
- * Club domestic league appearances and goals

Graham William Charles Smith (born 2 November 1947) is an English former professional footballer and former technical director of Sacramento Republic FC.

== Career ==
=== Playing career ===
Smith, who played as a goalkeeper, began his professional career in 1968 with Notts County. He also played in the Football League for Colchester United, West Bromwich Albion, and Cambridge United, making a total of 200 league appearances for all four clubs. Smith was a member of Colchester United's famous FA Cup giant killing team, beating Leeds United 3–2 on 13 February 1971. Smith was later inducted to the Colchester United Hall of Fame in 2009.

Management career

After playing professional football, Graham went on to be the product director at both Adidas and Le Coq Sportif. He then moved to Chelsea Football Club to take a position on the board of directors before moving into football agency, starting up First Wave Sports UK and then First Wave Sports USA.

He served as Head Coach of Ventura County Fusion in USL League Two from 2006 to 2009, before three years as Director of Football for USL Championship side Sacramento Republic from 2014 to 2017.

== Personal life ==
Graham is living both in California and Mexico. He has two sons both living in the USA. Graham's oldest son, Adam Smith, was also a professional footballer, beginning his career as a schoolboy at Premiership Club Everton. Adam later went on to spend a year with Walsall F.C. after completing a college degree in business and sports coaching at Manchester Metropolitan University, before going on to play with teams in Asia, Scotland and the US as a full-time professional and semi-professional player.

Graham is now happily semi-retired and his successful agency business (First Wave Sports) is now being run and managed by the former professional Major League Soccer player Stefani Miglioranzi. He lives with wife Norma, in both Mexico and South Carolina.

== Managerial statistics ==
- Ventura County Fusion. PDL National Championship winner 2009 (Head Coach)
- Sacramento Republic FC. USL National Championship winner 2014 (Technical Director)
- Sacramento Republic FC. USL Western Conference 1st-place finish (Director of Football)

== Honours ==
=== Playing honours ===
Colchester United

- Watney Cup: 1971
