= Brian Sherratt (footballer) =

English footballer (1944–2021)

Personal information
- Full name: Brian Sherratt
- Date of birth: 29 March 1944
- Place of birth: Stoke-on-Trent, England
- Date of death: 1 October 2021 (aged 77)
- Position: Goalkeeper

Youth career
- 1958–1960: Stoke City

Senior career*
Years	Team	Apps	(Gls)
1961–1962	Stoke City	1	(0)
1965–1968	Oxford United	44	(0)
1968	→ Nottingham Forest (loan)	1	(0)
1969–1970	Barnsley	15	(0)
1970	Gainsborough Trinity		
1970–1971	Colchester United	9	(0)
1971–1972	Oxford City		
1972	Clanfield		
Total		70	(0)
- * Club domestic league appearances and goals

Brian Sherratt (29 March 1944 – 1 October 2021) was an English footballer who played in the Football League for Barnsley, Colchester United, Nottingham Forest, Oxford United and Stoke City.

== Career ==
Sherratt started his footballing career at his local side Stoke City's youth team. He progressed up to first team level for the 1961–62 season where he provided back-up to City's number one Jimmy O'Neill. He made just a single appearance all season where he kept a clean sheet in a 2–0 home win over Middlesbrough in April 1962. Sherratt was released at the end of the season and joined Oxford United where he played 44 times in the league before moving to Barnsley. He spent a year at the "Tykes" but failed to establish himself as number one and joined Colchester United for the 1970–71 season but left at the end of the season.

== Career statistics ==
Appearances and goals by club, season and competition
Club	Season	League			FA Cup		League Cup		Total	
Club	Season	Division	Apps	Goals	Apps	Goals	Apps	Goals	Apps	Goals
Stoke City	1961–62	Second Division	1	0	0	0	0	0	1	0
Oxford United	1965–66	Third Division	11	0	0	0	0	0	11	0
Oxford United	1966–67	Third Division	22	0	2	0	0	0	24	0
Oxford United	1967–68	Third Division	11	0	3	0	3	0	17	0
Oxford United	Total		44	0	5	0	3	0	52	0
Nottingham Forest (loan)	1968–69	First Division	1	0	0	0	0	0	1	0
Barnsley	1969–70	Third Division	15	0	0	0	0	0	15	0
Colchester United	1970–71	Fourth Division	9	0	0	0	0	0	9	0
Career total			70	0	5	0	3	0	78	0

== Honours ==
Oxford United

- Football League Third Division champions: 1967–68
