= George Young (Welsh footballer) =

Welsh footballer

Personal information
- Full name: Robert George Young
- Date of birth: 5 January 1950 (age 76)
- Place of birth: Newport, Wales
- Position: Midfielder

Senior career*
Years	Team	Apps	(Gls)
1967–1972	Newport County	104	(6)
- * Club domestic league appearances and goals

Robert George Young (born 5 January 1950) is a Welsh former professional footballer. A midfielder, he joined Newport County in 1967 from local club Cromwell. He went on to make 104 appearances for Newport scoring 6 goals. In 1972, he joined Barry Town.
