= Eric Burgess (footballer) =

English footballer (born 1944)

Personal information
- Full name: Eric Robert Charles Burgess
- Date of birth: 27 October 1944 (age 82)
- Place of birth: Edgware, London, England
- Position: Defender

Youth career
- Watford

Senior career*
Years	Team	Apps	(Gls)
1963–1965	Watford	3	(0)
1965–1968	Torquay United	75	(0)
1968–1970	Plymouth Argyle	15	(0)
1970–1972	Colchester United	47	(9)
- Wealdstone
Total		140	(9)
- * Club domestic league appearances and goals

Eric Robert Charles Burgess (born 27 October 1944) is an English former footballer who played as a defender in the Football League for Watford, Torquay United, Plymouth Argyle and Colchester United. He was a member of the Colchester team that won the 1971 Watney Cup.

== Career ==
Burgess, born in Edgware, London, began his career with Watford where he made three first-team appearances between 1963 and 1965. Unable to break into the first-team at Vicarage Road, he joined Torquay United and established himself as a regular. He made 75 league appearances for the club until 1968, when he joined Plymouth Argyle on a free transfer, making his debut on 10 August of the same year. His stay with Plymouth was dogged by injuries following cartilage damage sustained in his first season at Home Park. Burgess managed only 15 appearances for the club, prior to being transferred to Colchester United.

Burgess made his debut for Colchester coming on as a 70th-minute substitute for Brian Hall in a 4–2 victory against Newport County on 20 February 1971. The only silverware of his career came with Colchester as they won the 1971 Watney Cup, playing in the final against West Bromwich Albion which the U's won 4–2 on penalties following a 4–4 draw in regular time. Burgess made 47 appearances and scored nine goals for Colchester, but was forced to leave the professional game through recurrence of the injuries picked up when at Plymouth.

After leaving Colchester, he signed for Wealdstone, and later ran a ladies fashion and promotional merchandise business.

== Honours ==
Colchester United

- 1971 Watney Cup winner

All honours referenced by:
