= Jimmy Mundy (footballer) =

English footballer

Personal information
- Full name: Harold James Mundy
- Date of birth: 2 September 1948 (age 78)
- Place of birth: Wythenshawe, England
- Position: Midfielder

Youth career
- Ashland Rovers

Senior career*
Years	Team	Apps	(Gls)
1968–1971	Manchester City	3	(0)
1970–1971	→ Oldham Athletic (loan)	8	(2)
- Bangor City
Total		11	(2)
- * Club domestic league appearances and goals

Jimmy Mundy (born 2 September 1948) is an English footballer, who played as a midfielder in the Football League for Manchester City and Oldham Athletic in late 1960s and early 1970s.
