= Brian Lewis (footballer) =

English footballer

Personal information
- Date of birth: 26 January 1943
- Place of birth: Woking, England
- Date of death: 14 December 1998 (aged 55)
- Place of death: Bournemouth, England
- Position: Midfielder

Youth career
- Crystal Palace

Senior career*
Years	Team	Apps	(Gls)
1960–1963	Crystal Palace	32	(4)
1963–1967	Portsmouth	134	(24)
1967–1968	Coventry City	35	(2)
1968–1970	Luton Town	43	(22)
1970	Oxford United	50	(22)
1970–1972	Colchester United	47	(19)
1972–1975	Portsmouth	48	(17)
1975–	Hastings United	60	(8)
- * Club domestic league appearances and goals

Brian Lewis (26 January 1943 – 14 December 1998) was an English footballer, most noted as a player for Portsmouth, Luton Town and Colchester United.

== Career ==
Lewis started out with Crystal Palace, but after only three years as a professional he moved to the club he supported, Portsmouth. After four years with Portsmouth, he moved on to first Coventry City, in 1967, and then Luton Town, in 1968. In 1970, he signed for Oxford United, but within the year he was on the move again, joining Colchester United. While at Colchester he took part in one of the great FA Cup giant-killings, when Fourth Division Colchester took on Leeds United in the fifth round in 1970–71. Leeds were one of the best teams in the country, and the tie seemed decided before a ball was kicked – but Colchester's team of veterans managed to beat Leeds 3–2. In 1972, he returned to Portsmouth, where he finished his professional career in 1975, when he moved on to Hastings United.

== Honours ==
=== Club ===
Crystal Palace

- Football League Fourth Division Runner-up (1): 1960–61

Coventry City

- Football League Second Division Winner (1): 1966–67

Colchester United

- Watney Cup Winner (1): 1972
