= Brian Stubbs =

English footballer

Personal information
- Full name: Brian Henry Stubbs
- Date of birth: 8 February 1950 (age 76)
- Place of birth: Keyworth, England
- Height: 5 ft 10 in (1.78 m)
- Position: Defender

Senior career*
Years	Team	Apps	(Gls)
1968–1980	Notts County	426	(21)
- * Club domestic league appearances and goals

Brian Henry Stubbs (born 8 February 1950) is a former footballer who played as a defender.

Initially a student at Loughborough University, Stubbs signed for Notts County in September 1968 and spent the whole of his professional career at the club. He played for the club in the Football League Fourth Division but by the time he left had helped them into the top flight.
