= Ray Wilson (Scottish footballer) =

Scottish footballer

Personal information
- Date of birth: 8 April 1947 (age 79)
- Place of birth: Grangemouth, Scotland
- Position: Full back

Youth career
- West Bromwich Albion

Senior career*
Years	Team	Apps	(Gls)
1964–1976	West Bromwich Albion	232	(3)

International career
1970	Scotland under-23	1	(0)
- * Club domestic league appearances and goals

Ray T. Wilson (born 8 April 1947) is a Scottish former football full-back.

An amateur with Woodburn Athletic he joined West Bromwich Albion on the same terms in 1963, turning professional a year later. Initially playing on the left side of midfield he soon settled into the left full-back position, dislodging Graham Williams with his hard tackling. A regular at left-back for a number of years, he suffered a shattered kneecap against Luton Town in August 1975 and was forced into early retirement as a consequence. He was awarded a testimonial game against Aston Villa the same year.

Following his retirement Wilson settled in Birmingham where he became a businessman.

== Honours ==
West Bromwich Albion

- Football League Cup runner-up: 1969–70
