= Brian Gibbs =

English footballer (1936–2014)

Personal information
- Full name: Brian Richard Gibbs
- Date of birth: 6 October 1936
- Place of birth: Gillingham, England
- Date of death: 27 January 2014 (aged 77)
- Height: 5 ft 10 in (1.78 m)
- Position: Inside left

Youth career
- Portsmouth

Senior career*
| Years | Team | Apps | (Gls) |
| ?–1957 | Gosport Borough | | |
| 1957–1962 | Bournemouth & Boscombe Athletic | 58 | (15) |
| 1962–1968 | Gillingham | 259 | (101) |
| 1968–1972 | Colchester United | 156 | (40) |
| 1972–? | Bletchley Town | | |

Managerial career
- 1975–: New Bradwell St Peter
- * Club domestic league appearances and goals

Brian Richard Gibbs (6 October 1936 – 27 January 2014) was an English professional footballer who played as a forward.

== Playing career ==
Born in Gillingham, Dorset Gibbs began his career on the South Coast with non-league Gosport Borough. In 1957, he joined Bournemouth & Boscombe Athletic, scoring 15 goals in 58 appearances. In 1962, he joined the Kent club Gillingham, where he made over 250 appearances and scored 101 league goals. He left Gillingham in 1968 after aiding the team to the 1963–64 Fourth Division championship to join Colchester United, where he spent four years scoring 40 goals in over 150 league appearances. He won the Watney Cup in 1971 with the U's, before stepping out of league football to join Bletchley Town.

== Managerial career ==
Gibbs became team manager of New Bradwell St Peter in 1975, and under his guidance the club won the South Midlands League Division One title in the 1976–77 season.

== Death ==
Gibbs died on 27 January 2014 at the age of 77.

== Honours ==
Gillingham

- Football League Fourth Division: 1963–64

Colchester United

- Watney Cup: 1971
