= Brian Garvey (footballer) =

English footballer (1937–2026)

Personal information
- Date of birth: 3 July 1937
- Place of birth: Hull, England
- Date of death: 5 April 2026 (aged 88)
- Place of death: Australia
- Position: Central defender

Senior career*
Years	Team	Apps	(Gls)
1957–1965	Hull City	232	(3)
1965–1970	Watford	180	(2)
1970–1972	Colchester United	77	(1)
1972–1973	Bedford Town		
1973–1974	Romford	3	(0)
Total		492	(6)

Managerial career
- 1972–1973: Bedford Town
- 1984–1986: Heidelberg United
- 1987-1989: South Melbourne
- * Club domestic league appearances and goals

Brian Garvey (3 July 1937 – 5 April 2026) was an English footballer who played as a central defender in the Football League.

== Career ==
Born in Kingston upon Hull, Garvey joined his hometown club Hull City in 1957, making over 200 league appearances. He joined Watford in 1965 making just under 200 league appearances and helped the team win the Third Division championship in 1969. He moved to his final club Colchester United in 1970, assisting the U's to a Watney Cup win in 1971. He left Colchester in 1972, and went on to play for non-league clubs Bedford Town (where he was player-manager until March 1973) and Romford.

After retiring, Garvey had spells coaching at Wolves and Arsenal. He then emigrated to Melbourne in the 1980s and became manager of power club Heidelberg United in the NSL from 1984 to 1986, and South Melbourne from 1987-1989. After retiring from coaching Garvey was employed as a security guard.

== Death ==
Garvey died in Australia on 5 April 2026, at the age of 88.

== Honours ==
Watford

- Football League Third Division: 1968–69

Colchester United

- Watney Cup: 1971
