= Brian Owen =

English footballer (1944–2025)

- A Man for All Seasons, by Brian Owen and Rob Hadgraft

Personal information
- Full name: Brian Ernest Owen
- Date of birth: 1 November 1944
- Place of birth: Harefield, Middlesex, England
- Date of death: July 2025 (aged 80)
- Position: Winger

Youth career
- 1961–1963: Watford

Senior career*
Years	Team	Apps	(Gls)
1963–1970	Watford	153	(17)
1970–1973	Colchester United	14	(2)
1972–1973	Wolverhampton Wanderers	4	(0)
Total		171	(19)
- * Club domestic league appearances and goals

Brian Ernest Owen (1 November 1944 – July 2025) was an English footballer who played as a winger. After a playing career that saw him play in the First Division and an FA Cup semi-final, Owen spent time as a coach, physiotherapist, assistant manager and scout for various professional clubs.

== Career ==
Born in Harefield, Middlesex, Owen joined Watford as an apprentice when he was 17. He spent most of his playing career at Watford, playing for them in an FA Cup semi final and helping them to a Football League Third Division championship. After making 170 appearances and scoring 20 goals for the club in all competitions, he was released on a free transfer in 1970.

He later played for Colchester United, and ended his career with four games in the First Division for Wolverhampton Wanderers.

Owen's playing career ended in 1973. He spent the next eleven years coaching at Wolves, Peterborough United and Ipswich Town, before serving as a physiotherapist for Crystal Palace, Colchester United, Luton Town and the England national team. After a brief spell as Cambridge United assistant manager in the 1992–93 season, he rejoined Colchester United in 1993. He received a benefit match from the club in 2005, and remained as a coach and scout at the club until at least 2009. Later still, he was the London scout for Hibernian FC.

== Death ==
Owen died in July 2025, at the age of 80.

== Honours ==
Watford

- Football League Third Division: 1968–69

Colchester United

- Watney Cup: 1972
