= Ray Crawford (footballer) =

English footballer (born 1936)

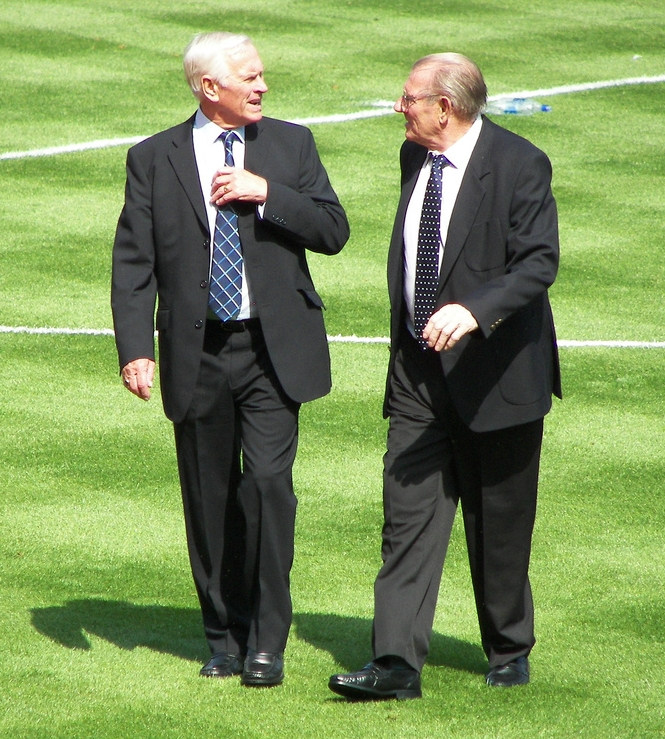
- Crawford (left) and former team-mate Ted Phillips at Portman Road

Personal information
- Full name: Raymond Crawford
- Date of birth: 13 July 1936 (age 90)
- Place of birth: Portsmouth, England
- Position: Striker

Youth career
- 1954–1957: Portsmouth

Senior career*
Years	Team	Apps	(Gls)
1957–1958	Portsmouth	19	(9)
1958–1963	Ipswich Town	197	(143)
1963–1965	Wolverhampton Wanderers	57	(39)
1965–1966	West Bromwich Albion	14	(6)
1966–1969	Ipswich Town	123	(61)
1969	Charlton Athletic	21	(7)
1969–1970	Kettering Town		
1970–1971	Colchester United	45	(24)
1971	Durban City	6	(1)
Total		482	(290)

International career
1956	Malaya	1	(0)
1961–1962	England	2	(1)

Managerial career
- Fareham Town
- * Club domestic league appearances and goals

Raymond Crawford (born 13 July 1936) is an English former professional footballer who played as a striker in a career that saw him score over 300 goals at club level. For the England national team, he made two appearances scoring once.

== Club career ==
Crawford began his career as a trainee at his home town club Portsmouth. He made his league debut on 24 August 1957 in a goalless draw with Burnley. He managed 19 appearances for the club at senior level before joining second flight Ipswich Town in August 1958.

A prolific striker, he helped Ipswich to win back-to-back titles, the Second Division in 1960–61 and the First Division in 1961–62. In the latter season, he was joint leading scorer in Division One – alongside Derek Kevan of West Bromwich Albion – with 33 goals. During this time, he won the first of his two England caps, becoming the first Ipswich Town player to be capped for England.

He was sold to Wolverhampton Wanderers in September 1963 where he scored 41 goals in 61 appearances (in total), before moving to rivals West Brom in January 1965, shortly before Wolves dropped out of the top flight. He failed to establish himself though at The Hawthorns and rejoined Ipswich in March 1965, where he played another three full seasons, lifting his tally for the club to 259 goals in all competitions.

He joined Charlton in March 1969, but soon dropped into the non-league with Kettering Town. He signed for Colchester United in June 1970 for £3,000 and in his only season with the club, scored 24 goals from 45 appearances. Most notably, he scored two goals for Colchester United in a giant-killing 3–2 victory against Leeds United in the fifth round of the FA Cup in 1971.

Crawford left English football after this season, heading to Durban City in South Africa, leaving an exceptional scoring rate in the Football League of 289 goals in 476 games. In his only season in South Africa, he won the cup and finished runner-up in the league.

He became youth-team coach at Brighton in 1972 but left after Brian Clough became manager the following year. He then worked as youth team manager and assistant manager to Jimmy Dickinson at his former side Portsmouth until 1979 and later managed non-league Fareham Town and Winchester City for a short while before retiring from the game in 1984, and becoming a merchandising representative. He is now retired but still plays a big active role within the community of Portsmouth, appearing at a lot of charity events and is a popular figure at Fratton Park every home game.

In 2007, he published his autobiography entitled "Curse of the Jungle Boy". The book explains how Crawford was known as 'Jungle Boy' because of his army service in Malaya. He had his own Jungle Boy chant used a lot by the fans.

== International career ==
Crawford's international career was surprisingly brief, but had three caps with two different countries. He made his international debut with Malaya national team in 1956. He played at left-wing for Malaya in their 4–2 win over Singapore on 1 April 1956 in the annual Sportsman's Trophy match. He was also named among the 17 players which travelled to represent Malaya in the Asian Cup qualifiers away in Cambodia and South Vietnam in April–May 1956, and not in the starting XI in either of the two qualifiers (Govindarajoo was the starting left-wing). After that, he played for England national team against Northern Ireland on 22 November 1961 and played in their next fixture, versus Austria on 4 April 1962, where he opened the scoring in a 3–1 win.

He also played for the Football League representative team.

== Post-playing career ==
Crawford works as a summariser on Express FM commentaries on Portsmouth matches and occasionally on Radio Suffolk on Ipswich Town games. He is known for his loud cheers and shouts and became an instant hit on Express FM. He also provides a weekly column for the Yellow Advertiser online newspaper discussing the fortunes of Colchester United FC.

== Career statistics ==
=== International ===
Appearances and goals by national team and year
National team	Year	Apps	Goals
England	1961	1	0
England	1962	1	1
Total		2	1

Scores and results list England's goal tally first, score column indicates score after each Crawford goal.

List of international goals scored by Ray Crawford
No.	Date	Venue	Opponent	Score	Result	Competition
1	4 April 1962	Wembley Stadium, London, England	Austria	1–0	3–1	Friendly

== Honours ==
Ipswich Town

- First Division/Premier League: (Note: From 1888 to 1992 the Football League First Division was the top tier of English football. It was superseded by the Premier League in 1992.) 1961–62
- Second Division/Championship: (Note: 2004 as Football League Championship) 1960–61, 1967–68

Individual

- Football League Second Division top scorer: 1960–61
- Football League First Division top scorer: 1961–62
- Ipswich Town Hall of Fame: Inducted 2007
- Colchester United Player of the Year: 1970–71
- Colchester United Hall of Fame

Records

- Ipswich Town F.C. all-time top scorer: 218 goals.
- The first footballer to score hat-tricks in the Football League, League Cup, FA Cup and European Cup.
