= Bobby Cram =

English footballer

Personal information
- Full name: Robert Cram
- Date of birth: 19 November 1939
- Place of birth: Hetton-le-Hole, County Durham, England
- Date of death: 14 April 2007 (aged 67)
- Place of death: Vancouver, British Columbia, Canada
- Position: Right-back

Youth career
- 1955–1957: West Bromwich Albion

Senior career*
Years	Team	Apps	(Gls)
1957–1968	West Bromwich Albion	141	(25)
1968	Vancouver Royals	32	(2)
1969	Eintracht Vancouver		
1970–1972	Colchester United	100	(4)
1972–1974	Bath City	15	(0)
1974	Seattle Sounders	5	(0)
1974–1975	Bromsgrove Rovers		
Total		293	(31)
- * Club domestic league appearances and goals

Robert Cram (19 November 1939 – 14 April 2007) was an English professional footballer.

== Career ==
Born in Hetton-le-Hole, County Durham, Cram joined West Bromwich Albion as an amateur in September 1955, at the age of 15. He turned professional in January 1957 but did not make his debut until October 1959 in a 0–0 draw against Bolton Wanderers. He went on to make 163 appearances for The Baggies including the 1966 and 1967 League Cup finals. He was one of the very few defenders to score a hat trick in a top level match v. Stoke City Sept 12th 1964. He is perhaps most remembered for being the captain of the Colchester United team that beat Leeds United in the 1971 FA Cup, one of the greatest shocks in the competition's history. In 1968 he went on loan with the Vancouver Royals in the North American Soccer League. He returned to the NASL in 1974, this time with the Seattle Sounders.

== International ==
In June 1972, Cram was one of five footballers with English League experience pre-selected by Canadian coach Frank Pike for the CONCACAF / FIFA World Cup Qualifiers Germany 1974. Just two months later, however, neither Cram, Bob Lenarduzzi or Les Wilson were available to the Canadian team.

== Personal ==
Cram died in Canada of a heart attack, aged 68, in April 2007. Bobby Cram was also the uncle of athlete Steve Cram.

== Honours ==
West Bromwich Albion

- Football League Cup: 1965–66; runner-up: 1966–67

Colchester United

- Watney Cup: 1971
