= Phil Bloss =

English footballer

Personal information
- Full name: Philip Kenneth Bloss
- Date of birth: 16 January 1953 (age 73)
- Place of birth: Colchester, England
- Position: Midfielder

Senior career*
Years	Team	Apps	(Gls)
1970–1973	Colchester United	34	(2)
1973–1974	Wimbledon	30	(0)
- * Club domestic league appearances and goals

Philip Kenneth Bloss (born 16 January 1953) is an English former professional footballer who played as a midfielder in the Football League.
