= Dave Simmons (footballer) =

English footballer (1948–2007)

Personal information
- Full name: David John Simmons
- Date of birth: 24 October 1948
- Place of birth: Ryde, Isle of Wight, England
- Date of death: 3 July 2007 (aged 58)
- Place of death: Ely, England
- Position: Forward

Senior career*
| Years | Team | Apps | (Gls) |
| 1966–1969 | Arsenal | 0 | (0) |
| 1968 | → Bournemouth (loan) | 7 | (3) |
| 1969–1970 | Aston Villa | 17 | (7) |
| 1970 | → Walsall (loan) | 5 | (2) |
| 1970–1973 | Colchester United | 62 | (11) |
| 1973–1974 | Cambridge United | 24 | (3) |
| 1974–1975 | Brentford | 52 | (17) |
| 1975–1976 | Cambridge United | 17 | (5) |
| Total | | 184 | (48) |
- * Club domestic league appearances and goals

David John Simmons (24 October 1948 – 3 July 2007) was an English footballer who played for a number of Football League teams in the 1970s. He is perhaps best known for scoring the decisive goal in Colchester United's shock win against Leeds in the 1971 FA Cup.

== Career ==
A native of Ryde on the Isle of Wight, Simmons began his professional football career at Arsenal, but never played any first team competitive matches for the Gunners. Although a prolific goalscorer in the youth and reserve teams, he only played friendlies for the first team and spent a period of time out on loan at Bournemouth. In February 1969, he was transferred to Aston Villa, where he only played sporadically despite a good goal rate. In December 1970, he moved to Colchester. On 13 February 1971, Simmons scored one of the goals as the Fourth Division side won 3–2 against Don Revie's Leeds to qualify for the quarter-finals of the FA Cup.

In March 1973, Simmons moved to Cambridge United, and a year later he moved to Brentford, before returning for a second spell at Cambridge in November 1975. In total, Simmons played 184 league games, scoring 48 goals. He left Cambridge at the end of the 1975–76 season, and retired from the professional game due to arthritis. He later played for several non-league clubs in Cambridgeshire, including Cambridge City, Newmarket Town, Ely City and Soham Town Rangers.

Simmons died in July 2007, following a long battle with cancer, aged 58.

== Honours ==
=== Club ===
Arsenal

- FA Youth Cup Winner (1): 1965–66

Colchester United

- Watney Cup Winner (1): 1971
