= Watney Cup =

- Founded: 1970
- Abolished: 1973
- Region: England
- Teams: 8

The Watney Mann Invitation Cup (normally referred to as simply the Watney Cup) was a short-lived English football tournament held in the early 1970s.

It was held before the start of the season, and was contested by the teams that had scored the most goals in each of the four divisions of the Football League the previous season who had not been promoted or admitted to one of the European competitions. Two teams from each division took part, making eight participants in total.

The competition was a straight knockout format, each match was a one-off with no replays. The final took place at the home ground of one of the finalists, rather than a neutral venue.

The competition was so named thanks to a sponsorship deal with the Watney Mann brewery; the first tournament for Football League clubs to sell its naming rights. The tournament ran four times, from 1970 to 1973, before being discontinued.

From the second season of the competition, the off-side law was applied from the edge of the penalty areas only (instead of the half-way line). This measure was designed to reduce midfield congestion and promote more goals, at a time when defences were becoming much better organised.

The first ever penalty shoot-out in England took place in a semi-final of the 1970 tournament between Hull City and Manchester United, and was won by Manchester United. The first footballer to take a kick was George Best, and the first to miss was Denis Law, whose attempt was saved by Hull goalkeeper Ian McKechnie. McKechnie became the first player to miss a deciding kick, when he shot wide after taking the fifth kick for Hull in the shoot-out.

Following the dissolution of the competition in 1975 the trophy itself was put up for sale and purchased by Derby Museum, who presented it back to the first ever winner, Derby County. It was put on display in the club trophy cabinet where, in 2018, it was spotted by the chairperson of Stoke City fan's council who helped arrange a share deal between Derby and Stoke City, who had been the last ever winner.

== List of finals ==
Year	Winner	Score	Runner-up	Venue
1970	Derby County	4–1	Manchester United	Baseball Ground
1971	Colchester United	4–4 (4–3 pen.)	West Bromwich Albion	The Hawthorns
1972	Bristol Rovers	0–0 (7–6 pen.)	Sheffield United	Eastville Stadium
1973	Stoke City	2–0	Hull City	Victoria Ground

== Participants ==
A total of 26 teams competed in the competition during its existence. Peterborough United took part in three of the four tournaments and four teams took part twice.

1970

- First Division
  - Derby County
  - Manchester United
- Second Division
  - Hull City
  - Sheffield United
- Third Division
  - Fulham
  - Reading
- Fourth Division
  - Aldershot
  - Peterborough United

1971

- First Division
  - Manchester United
  - West Bromwich Albion
- Second Division
  - Carlisle United
  - Luton Town
- Third Division
  - Halifax Town
  - Wrexham
- Fourth Division
  - Colchester United
  - Crewe Alexandra

1972

- First Division
  - Sheffield United
  - Wolverhampton Wanderers
- Second Division
  - Blackpool
  - Burnley
- Third Division
  - Bristol Rovers
  - Notts County
- Fourth Division
  - Lincoln City
  - Peterborough United

1973

- First Division
  - Stoke City
  - West Ham United
- Second Division
  - Bristol City
  - Hull City
- Third Division
  - Bristol Rovers
  - Plymouth Argyle
- Fourth Division
  - Mansfield Town
  - Peterborough United
