= 1969–70 Colchester United F.C. season =

Colchester United
1969–70 season
- Chairman: Bill Graver
- Manager: Dick Graham
- Stadium: Layer Road
- Fourth Division: 10th
- FA Cup: 1st round (eliminated by Newport County)
- League Cup: 2nd round (eliminated by Ipswich Town)
- Top goalscorer: League: Ken Jones (16); All: Ken Jones (16)
- Highest home attendance: 7,133 v Peterborough United, 25 August 1969
- Lowest home attendance: 2,571 v Darlington, 20 December 1969
- Average home league attendance: 4,664
- Biggest win: 3–0 v Reading, 20 August 1969 v Workington, 24 January 1970 v York City, 28 February 1970; 4–1 v Chesterfield, 2 March 1970
- Biggest defeat: 0–4 v Ipswich Town, 3 September 1969
Home colours

The 1969–70 season was Colchester United's 28th season in their history and their second successive season in the fourth tier of English football, the Fourth Division. Alongside competing in the Fourth Division, the club also participated in the FA Cup and the League Cup.

Colchester ended an injury blighted season in tenth position in the Fourth Division, while they were knocked out in the first round of the FA Cup by Newport County, and in the second round of the League Cup by neighbours and rivals Ipswich Town in their heaviest defeat of the campaign.

== Season overview ==
For the new season, manager Dick Graham employed a new policy of recruiting older, more experienced players. He said:

I believe in signing players who have done something big and giving them a new lease of life

He brought in Bobby Cram, formerly of West Bromwich Albion and hitherto playing in Canada, to become his captain for the season, while also paying £5,000 for Ken Jones from Millwall.

An eleven-game unbeaten home run gave Colchester a chance for a promotion push, but an expanding injury list held back the U's progress. Trainer Dennis Mochan made a final appearance for the club during the campaign having taking up a coaching position at the end of the previous season. The club finished in tenth place, while exiting both Cups in the early rounds; a defeat to Newport County in the first round of the FA Cup, and a second round defeat to Ipswich Town in the League Cup.

== Players ==
As of match played 28 April 1970.

Name	Position	Nationality	Place of birth	Date of birth	Apps	Goals	Signed from	Date signed	Fee
Goalkeepers
Graham Smith	GK	(England)	Liverpool	2 November 1947 (aged 21)	0	0	(England) Notts County	Summer 1969	Free transfer
Ron Willis	GK	(England)	Romford	27 December 1947 (aged 21)	3	0	(England) Charlton Athletic	October 1968	£1,500
Defenders
Dave Bickles	CB	(England)	West Ham	6 April 1944 (aged 25)	35	3	(England) Crystal Palace	28 September 1968 (Note: Date of signing refers to the date of the player's first game for the club)	Free transfer
Micky Cook	FB	(England)	Enfield	9 April 1951 (aged 18)	0	0	(England) Orient	1 March 1969	Free transfer
Bobby Cram	FB	(England)	Hetton-le-Hole	19 November 1939 (aged 29)	0	0	(Canada) Vancouver Royals	17 January 1970	Free transfer
Alan Dennis	CB	(England)	Colchester	22 February 1951 (aged 18)	0	0	Apprentice	April 1967	Free transfer
Brian Hall	LB	(England)	Burbage	9 March 1939 (aged 30)	204	22	(England) Mansfield Town	March 1965	Free transfer
Bert Howe	FB	(England)	Charlton	16 November 1938 (aged 30)	0	0	(England) Orient	Summer 1969	Free transfer
Bobby Howlett	CB	(England)	West Ham	12 December 1948 (aged 20)	0	0	(England) Southend United	Summer 1968	Free transfer
Adrian Webster	DF	(England)	Colchester	6 November 1951 (aged 17)	0	0	Apprentice	July 1968	Free transfer
Brian Wood	CB	(England)	Hamworthy	8 December 1940 (aged 28)	30	1	(England) Orient	14 September 1968	£4,000
Midfielders
Steve Foley	MF	(England)	Clacton-on-Sea	21 June 1953 (aged 15)	0	0	Apprentice	July 1969	Free transfer
Ken Jones	MF	(England)	Keighley	9 February 1941 (aged 28)	0	0	(England) Millwall	November 1969	£5,000
Roger Joslyn	MF	(England)	Colchester	7 May 1950 (aged 19)	53	3	Apprentice	23 December 1967	Free transfer
Forwards
Micky Brown	WG	(England)	Farnham Common	11 April 1944 (aged 25)	22	3	(England) Luton Town	26 October 1968	£3,000
Terry Dyson	WG	(England)	Malton	29 November 1934 (aged 34)	43	3	(England) Fulham	24 August 1968	Free transfer
Brian Gibbs	FW	(England)	Gillingham	6 October 1936 (aged 32)	38	11	(England) Gillingham	September 1968	£8,000
Danny Light	FW	(England)	Chiswick	10 July 1948 (aged 20)	45	14	(England) Crystal Palace	August 1968	£4,000
Roy Massey	FW	(England)	Mexborough	10 September 1943 (aged 25)	0	0	(England) Orient	July 1969	£5,000
Jim Oliver	FW	(Scotland)	Falkirk	3 December 1941 (aged 27)	58	10	(England) Brighton & Hove Albion	January 1968	£2,000
Ray Whittaker	WG	(England)	Bow	15 January 1945 (aged 24)	0	0	(England) Luton Town	9 August 1969	Free transfer

== Transfers ==
=== In ===
Date	Position	Nationality	Name	From	Fee	Ref.
Summer 1969	GK	(England)	Graham Smith	(England) Notts County	Free transfer	
Summer 1969	FB	(England)	Bert Howe	(England) Orient	Free transfer	
Summer 1969	WG	(England)	Steve Pitt	(England) Tottenham Hotspur	Free transfer	
July 1969	MF	(England)	Steve Foley	Apprentice	Free transfer	
July 1969	FW	(England)	Roy Massey	(England) Orient	£5,000	
9 August 1969	WG	(England)	Ray Whittaker	(England) Luton Town	Free transfer	(Note: Date of signing refers to the date of the player's first game for the club)
November 1969	MF	(England)	Ken Jones	(England) Millwall	£5,000	
17 January 1970	FB	(England)	Bobby Cram	(Canada) Vancouver Royals	Free transfer	

- Total spending: ▼ ~ £10,000

=== Out ===
Date	Position	Nationality	Name	To	Fee	Ref.
End of season	CB	(England)	Brian Honeywood	(England) Chelmsford City	Free transfer	
Summer 1969	WG	(England)	Johnny Martin	(England) Workington	Released	
31 May 1969	WG	(England)	Terry Price	(England) Chelmsford City	Free transfer	
1 July 1969	GK	(England)	Ernie Adams	(England) Crewe Alexandra	Free transfer	
August 1969	GK	(Gibraltar)	Tony Macedo	(South Africa) Durban City	£6,000	
5 August 1969	FB	(England)	Owen Simpson	(England) Southend United	£4,000	
October 1969	WG	(England)	Steve Pitt	(England) Stevenage Borough	Released	
25 October 1969	FB	(Scotland)	Dennis Mochan	(England) Colchester United	Coaching staff	(Note: Date of departure refers to the date of the player's final game for the club)

- Total incoming: ▲ ~ £10,000

=== Loans in ===
Date	Position	Nationality	Name	From	End date	Ref.
11 October 1969	FB	(England)	Eddie Presland	(England) Crystal Palace	8 November 1969	(Note: Loan start and end dates refer to the date of the player's first and final games for the club)
1 November 1969	WG	(Scotland)	Malcolm Slater	(England) Orient	25 November 1969	

== Match details ==
=== Fourth Division ===
==== Results round by round ====
Round	1	2	3	4	5	6	7	8	9	10	11	12	13	14	15	16	17	18	19	20	21	22	23	24	25	26	27	28	29	30	31	32	33	34	35	36	37	38	39	40	41	42	43	44	45	46
Ground	A	H	A	H	H	A	H	A	A	H	H	A	A	H	A	H	A	H	H	A	A	H	H	H	A	H	A	H	A	A	H	H	A	H	A	A	H	H	A	A	H	H	A	H	A	A
Result	D	W	D	W	D	L	W	W	D	D	L	L	L	W	L	L	D	L	W	D	W	W	W	D	L	W	D	D	W	L	W	W	L	D	D	L	W	W	L	D	L	W	L	W	D	L
Position	7	4	7	3	6	8	4	4	4	6	7	8	10	9	11	12	13	14	13	13	13	11	10	11	13	10	10	10	9	12	11	10	10	10	11	11	12	10	12	11	11	11	12	10	10	10

Source: 11v11.com
A = Away; H = Home; W = Win; D = Draw; L = Loss

==== League table ====
Pos	Team	Pld	W	D	L	GF	GA	GAv	Pts	Promotion or relegation
8	Lincoln City	46	17	16	13	66	52	1.269	50	
9	Peterborough United	46	17	14	15	77	69	1.116	48	Qualified for the Watney Cup (Note: The two teams who scored the most goals in each division, and did not qualify for Europe and were not promoted, qualified for the Watney Cup.)
10	Colchester United	46	17	14	15	64	63	1.016	48	
11	Chester	46	21	6	19	58	66	0.879	48	
12	Scunthorpe United	46	18	10	18	67	65	1.031	46	

Source: rsssf.com

==== Matches ====
9 August 1969 1	Lincoln City	3–3	Colchester United	Lincoln
	Fletcher 20', 21'; Harford 80'	Report	Gibbs 36', 56'; Massey 75'	Stadium: Sincil Bank; Attendance: 6,761

16 August 1969 2	Colchester United	2–0	Wrexham	Colchester
	Gibbs 52'; Whittaker 61'	Report		Stadium: Layer Road; Attendance: 5,292; Referee: N Graham

23 August 1969 3	Notts County	1–1	Colchester United	Nottingham
	Hobson 32'	Report	Massey 21'	Stadium: Meadow Lane; Attendance: 4,901; Referee: A Seeley

25 August 1969 4	Colchester United	2–1	Peterborough United	Colchester
	Hall 54'; Gibbs 90'	Report; Report	Moss 83'	Stadium: Layer Road; Attendance: 7,133; Referee: L Sinkins

30 August 1969 5	Colchester United	0–0	Port Vale	Colchester
		Report		Stadium: Layer Road; Attendance: 6,323; Referee: J Quinn

6 September 1969 6	Darlington	3–2	Colchester United	Darlington
	Melling 21' (pen.), 70'; Robson 26'	Report	Massey 59', 84'	Stadium: Feethams; Attendance: 3,767; Referee: I Smith

13 September 1969 7	Colchester United	1–0	Crewe Alexandra	Colchester
	Massey 69'	Report		Stadium: Layer Road; Attendance: 5,084; Referee: N Paget

16 September 1969 8	Oldham Athletic	1–2	Colchester United	Oldham
	Beardall 15'	Report	Massey 50'; Brown 64'	Stadium: Boundary Park; Attendance: 3,993; Referee: T Gill

20 September 1969 9	Hartlepool	0–0	Colchester United	Hartlepool
		Report; Report		Stadium: Victoria Park; Attendance: 3,667; Referee: H Davey

27 September 1969 10	Colchester United	1–1	Swansea City	Colchester
	Massey 60'	Report	Gwyther 74'	Stadium: Layer Road; Attendance: 5,748; Referee: A Green

29 September 1969 11	Colchester United	0–2	Scunthorpe United	Colchester
		Report	Deere 52'; Heath 57' (pen.)	Stadium: Layer Road; Attendance: 6,328

4 October 1969 12	Newport County	4–1	Colchester United	Newport
	Derrick 3'; Hill 13', 35'; Raybould 33'	Report	Whittaker 86'	Stadium: Somerton Park; Attendance: 2,996; Referee: G Jones

6 October 1969 13	Wrexham	4–2	Colchester United	Wrexham
	Smith 6', 9', 14'; Park 8'	Report	Brown 4'; Hall 60'	Stadium: Racecourse Ground; Attendance: 11,967

11 October 1969 14	Colchester United	2–1	Bradford Park Avenue	Colchester
	Whittaker 67'; Brown 90'	Report	Massie 32'	Stadium: Layer Road; Attendance: 4,440; Referee: J Lewis

18 October 1969 15	York City	4–2	Colchester United	York
	Hall 25' (o.g.); Boyer 50', 82'; Mahon 90'	Report	Brown 69'; Hall 86'	Stadium: Bootham Crescent; Attendance: 3,961

25 October 1969 16	Colchester United	0–1	Chester	Colchester
		Report	Bradbury 80'	Stadium: Layer Road; Attendance: 3,754; Referee: H Hackney

1 November 1969 17	Aldershot	1–1	Colchester United	Aldershot
	Melia 23'	Report	Brown 40'	Stadium: Recreation Ground; Attendance: 5,966; Referee: W Hall

8 November 1969 18	Colchester United	0–2	Southend United	Colchester
		Report; Report	Clayton 20'; McMillan 77'	Stadium: Layer Road; Attendance: 6,021; Referee: Ken Burns

22 November 1969 19	Colchester United	3–2	Grimsby Town	Colchester
	Gibbs 56'; Brown 59', 82'	Report	Brace 2'; Hickman 84'	Stadium: Layer Road; Attendance: 3,474; Referee: F Bassett

25 November 1969 20	Northampton Town	1–1	Colchester United	Northampton
	Kiernan 9'	Report	Brown 27'	Stadium: County Ground; Attendance: 3,256; Referee: R Weedon

13 December 1969 21	Crewe Alexandra	0–1	Colchester United	Crewe
		Report	Jones 22'	Stadium: Gresty Road; Attendance: 2,670; Referee: K Styles

20 December 1969 22	Colchester United	2–1	Darlington	Colchester
	Jones 21'; Gibbs 57'	Report	Gauden 58'	Stadium: Layer Road; Attendance: 2,571; Referee: K Sweet

26 December 1969 23	Colchester United	2–1	Notts County	Colchester
	Gibbs 35', 76'	Report	Ryan 42'	Stadium: Layer Road; Attendance: 4,789

10 January 1970 24	Colchester United	1–1	Hartlepool	Colchester
	Jones 29'	Report; Report	Kirk 75'	Stadium: Layer Road; Attendance: 3,200; Referee: J Sier

17 January 1970 25	Swansea City	1–0	Colchester United	Swansea
	Thomas 1'	Report		Stadium: Vetch Field; Attendance: 8,008

24 January 1970 26	Colchester United	3–0	Workington	Colchester
	Whittaker 30'; Gibbs 39'; Jones 45'	Report		Stadium: Layer Road; Attendance: 4,265; Referee: K Wynn

27 January 1970 27	Scunthorpe United	1–1	Colchester United	Scunthorpe
	Cassidy 18'	Report	Jones 78'	Stadium: Old Showground; Attendance: 6,276; Referee: J Thacker

31 January 1970 28	Colchester United	1–1	Newport County	Colchester
	Gibbs 16'	Report	Wood (o.g.)	Stadium: Layer Road; Attendance: 4,679; Referee: H Ellis

7 February 1970 29	Bradford Park Avenue	0–1	Colchester United	Bradford
		Report	Brown 6'	Stadium: Park Avenue; Attendance: 2,972; Referee: C Robinson

21 February 1970 30	Southend United	2–1	Colchester United	Southend-on-Sea
	Best 9'; Moore 76'	Report; Report	Oliver 31'	Stadium: Roots Hall; Attendance: 6,778; Referee: G Hartley

28 February 1970 31	Colchester United	3–0	York City	Colchester
	Jones 21', 70'; Gibbs 73'	Report		Stadium: Layer Road; Attendance: 3,803; Referee: I Hunting

2 March 1970 32	Colchester United	4–1	Chesterfield	Colchester
	Wood 30'; Jones 39', 60'; Gibbs 85'	Report	Pugh 47'	Stadium: Layer Road; Attendance: 5,665; Referee: R Johnson

11 March 1970 33	Exeter City	2–1	Colchester United	Exeter
	Mitten 30'; Banks 82'	Report	Jones 75'	Stadium: St James Park; Attendance: 4,010; Referee: T Reynolds

14 March 1970 34	Colchester United	1–1	Brentford	Colchester
	Jones 58'	Report	Ross 37'	Stadium: Layer Road; Attendance: 4,878; Referee: J Yates

18 March 1970 35	Workington	1–1	Colchester United	Workington
	Spencer 47'	Report	Jones 60'	Stadium: Borough Park; Attendance: 2,368; Referee: P Baldwin

21 March 1970 36	Chesterfield	2–0	Colchester United	Chesterfield
	Randall 33'; Moss 86'	Report		Stadium: Saltergate; Attendance: 9,257

27 March 1970 37	Colchester United	3–1	Aldershot	Colchester
	Jones 16', 46' (pen.); Howe 44'	Report	Brown 58'	Stadium: Layer Road; Attendance: 6,163; Referee: Kevin Howley

28 March 1970 38	Colchester United	2–1	Exeter City	Colchester
	Gibbs 3'; Jones 72'	Report	Wingate 20'	Stadium: Layer Road; Attendance: 3,842; Referee: K Styles

1 April 1970 39	Chester	1–0	Colchester United	Chester
	Tarbuck 82'	Report		Stadium: Sealand Road; Attendance: 2,580; Referee: B Golightly

4 April 1970 40	Peterborough United	1–1	Colchester United	Peterborough
	Hall 53'	Report; Report	Jones 7'	Stadium: London Road Stadium; Attendance: 4,165; Referee: A Hart

6 April 1970 41	Colchester United	0–3	Northampton Town	Colchester
		Report	McNeil 24', 43', 50'	Stadium: Layer Road; Attendance: 3,776

13 April 1970 42	Colchester United	3–1	Oldham Athletic	Colchester
	Whittaker 5'; Joslyn 24'; Hall 60'	Report	Blore 23'	Stadium: Layer Road; Attendance: 2,921; Referee: Ron Challis

18 April 1970 43	Brentford	2–0	Colchester United	Brentford
	Renwick 12'; Docherty 63'	Report		Stadium: Griffin Park; Attendance: 4,720

22 April 1970 44	Colchester United	2–0	Lincoln City	Colchester
	Whittaker 13', 18'	Report		Stadium: Layer Road; Attendance: 2,611

25 April 1970 45	Port Vale	1–1	Colchester United	Burslem
	McLaren 38'	Report	Dyson 75'	Stadium: Vale Park; Attendance: 5,626; Referee: W Wallace

28 April 1970 46	Grimsby Town	5–3	Colchester United	Cleethorpes
	Oates 20', 41'; Hickman 56', 71', 82'	Report	Light 44', 63'; Gibbs 55'	Stadium: Blundell Park; Attendance: 2,074; Referee: A Bone

=== League Cup ===
13 August 1969 1st round	Colchester United	1–1	Reading	Colchester
	Massey 9'	Report	Harris 43' (pen.)	Stadium: Layer Road; Attendance: 5,165

20 August 1969 1st round replay	Reading	0–3	Colchester United	Reading
		Report	Massey 43', 72', 83'	Stadium: Elm Park; Attendance: 11,065; Referee: Ron Challis

3 September 1969 2nd round	Ipswich Town	4–0	Colchester United	Ipswich
	Carroll 21'; Mills 49'; Brogan 80' (pen.), 81' (pen.)	Report; Report		Stadium: Portman Road; Attendance: 19,012; Referee: R Paine

=== FA Cup ===
15 November 1969 1st round	Newport County	2–1	Colchester United	Newport
	White 1'; Thomas 50'	Report	Ferguson 24' (o.g.)	Stadium: Somerton Park; Attendance: 4,224; Referee: J Sier

== Squad statistics ==
=== Appearances and goals ===
No.	Pos	Nat	Player	Total		Fourth Division		FA Cup		League Cup	
No.	Pos	Nat	Player	Apps	Goals	Apps	Goals	Apps	Goals	Apps	Goals
	GK	(England) ENG	Graham Smith	46	0	43	0	1	0	2	0
	GK	(England) ENG	Ron Willis	4	0	3	0	0	0	1	0
	DF	(England) ENG	Dave Bickles	36	0	33	0	1	0	2	0
	DF	(England) ENG	Micky Cook	21	0	19+1	0	1	0	0	0
	DF	(England) ENG	Bobby Cram	21	0	21	0	0	0	0	0
	DF	(England) ENG	Alan Dennis	3	0	2+1	0	0	0	0	0
	DF	(England) ENG	Brian Hall	49	4	45	4	1	0	3	0
	DF	(England) ENG	Bert Howe	30	1	29	1	0	0	1	0
	DF	(England) ENG	Bobby Howlett	18	0	10+6	0	0	0	1+1	0
	DF	(England) ENG	Brian Wood	47	1	43	1	1	0	3	0
	MF	(England) ENG	Ken Jones	28	16	28	16	0	0	0	0
	MF	(England) ENG	Roger Joslyn	45	1	38+4	1	0	0	2+1	0
	FW	(England) ENG	Micky Brown	36	9	30+2	9	1	0	3	0
	FW	(England) ENG	Terry Dyson	15	1	13+2	1	0	0	0	0
	FW	(England) ENG	Brian Gibbs	45	14	41	14	1	0	3	0
	FW	(England) ENG	Danny Light	28	2	23+1	2	1	0	3	0
	FW	(England) ENG	Roy Massey	23	11	18+1	7	1	0	3	4
	FW	(Scotland) SCO	Jim Oliver	22	1	17+2	1	0+1	0	2	0
	FW	(England) ENG	Ray Whittaker	41	7	36+1	7	1	0	3	0
Players who appeared for Colchester who left during the season
	DF	(Scotland) SCO	Dennis Mochan	1	0	1	0	0	0	0	0
	DF	(England) ENG	Eddie Presland	6	0	5	0	1	0	0	0
	FW	(England) ENG	Steve Pitt	7	0	4+2	0	0	0	1	0
	FW	(Scotland) SCO	Malcolm Slater	4	0	4	0	0	0	0	0

=== Goalscorers ===
Place	Nationality	Position	Name	Fourth Division	FA Cup	League Cup	Total
1	(England)	MF	Ken Jones	16	0	0	16
2	(England)	FW	Brian Gibbs	14	0	0	14
3	(England)	FW	Roy Massey	7	0	4	11
4	(England)	WG	Micky Brown	9	0	0	9
5	(England)	WG	Ray Whittaker	7	0	0	7
6	(England)	LB	Brian Hall	4	0	0	4
7	(England)	FW	Danny Light	2	0	0	2
8	(England)	WG	Terry Dyson	1	0	0	1
8	(England)	FB	Bert Howe	1	0	0	1
8	(England)	MF	Roger Joslyn	1	0	0	1
8	(Scotland)	FW	Jim Oliver	1	0	0	1
8	(England)	CB	Brian Wood	1	0	0	1
			Own goals	0	1	0	1
			TOTALS	64	1	4	69

=== Disciplinary record ===
Nationality	Position	Name	Fourth Division		FA Cup		League Cup		Total	
Nationality	Position	Name	Booked	Sent off (straight red)	Booked	Sent off (straight red)	Booked	Sent off (straight red)	Booked	Sent off (straight red)
(England)	WG	Terry Dyson	1	0	0	0	0	0	1	0
(England)	FW	Brian Gibbs	1	0	0	0	0	0	1	0
(England)	LB	Brian Hall	1	0	0	0	0	0	1	0
(England)	FB	Bert Howe	1	0	0	0	0	0	1	0
(England)	CB	Bobby Howlett	1	0	0	0	0	0	1	0
(Scotland)	FW	Jim Oliver	1	0	0	0	0	0	1	0
(Scotland)	WG	Malcolm Slater	1	0	0	0	0	0	1	0
		TOTALS	7	0	0	0	0	0	7	0

=== Clean sheets ===
Number of games goalkeepers kept a clean sheet.

Place	Nationality	Player	Fourth Division	FA Cup	League Cup	Total
1	(England)	Graham Smith	9	0	1	10
		TOTALS	9	0	1	10

=== Player debuts ===
Players making their first-team Colchester United debut in a fully competitive match.

Position	Nationality	Player	Date	Opponent	Ground	Notes
GK	(England)	Graham Smith	9 August 1969	Lincoln City	Sincil Bank	
FB	(England)	Bert Howe	9 August 1969	Lincoln City	Sincil Bank	
CB	(England)	Bobby Howlett	9 August 1969	Lincoln City	Sincil Bank	
FW	(England)	Roy Massey	9 August 1969	Lincoln City	Sincil Bank	
WG	(England)	Steve Pitt	9 August 1969	Lincoln City	Sincil Bank	
WG	(England)	Ray Whittaker	9 August 1969	Lincoln City	Sincil Bank	
FB	(England)	Micky Cook	6 October 1969	Wrexham	Racecourse Ground	
FB	(England)	Eddie Presland	11 October 1969	Bradford Park Avenue	Layer Road	
WG	(Scotland)	Malcolm Slater	1 November 1969	Aldershot	Recreation Ground	
MF	(England)	Ken Jones	22 November 1969	Grimsby Town	Layer Road	
FB	(England)	Bobby Cram	17 January 1970	Swansea City	Vetch Field	
CB	(England)	Alan Dennis	22 April 1970	Lincoln City	Layer Road	

== See also ==
- List of Colchester United F.C. seasons
