= 1968–69 Colchester United F.C. season =

Colchester United
1968–69 season
- Chairman: Arthur Neville
- Manager: Dick Graham
- Stadium: Layer Road
- Fourth Division: 6th
- FA Cup: 2nd round (eliminated by Exeter City)
- League Cup: 2nd round (eliminated by Workington)
- Top goalscorer: League: Danny Light (12); All: Danny Light (14)
- Highest home attendance: 10,604 v Southend United, 29 November 1968
- Lowest home attendance: 3,199 v Doncaster Rovers, 31 August 1968
- Average home league attendance: 6,048
- Biggest win: 5–0 v Chesham United, 16 November 1968
- Biggest defeat: 0–4 v Brentford, 10 August 1968 v Scunthorpe United, 26 August 1968 v Rochdale, 8 March 1969; 1–5 v Chester, 24 August 1968
Home colours

The 1968–69 season was Colchester United's 27th season in their history and their first season back in the fourth tier of English football, the Fourth Division following relegation the previous season. Alongside competing in the Fourth Division, the club also participated in the FA Cup and the League Cup.

In a transitional season under new manager Dick Graham, Colchester missed an instant return to the third tier by four points, finishing the season in sixth place. The U's were eliminated at the second round of both FA and League Cups.

== Season overview ==
Colchester appointed former Crystal Palace manager Dick Graham to replace Neil Franklin. Having guided Palace from the Fourth Division to the Second Division, Graham intended to emulate his work at Selhurst Park.

Seven games into the season, with his side earning just one point, Graham cleared out the squad, ousting six players and sold Duncan Forbes and Derek Trevis for a combined fee of £19,000. He brought in a number of players, including goalkeeper Tony Macedo and former Tottenham Hotspur double-winner Terry Dyson. Colchester's form drastically improved, earning 33 points from a possible 42 to propel up the table into fourth position and the promotion places. However, after a poor Easter period, earning just two points against promotion-rivals Bradford City, Halifax Town and Swansea Town saw the U's slip back into sixth place and four points short of promotion.

== Players ==
As of match played 2 May 1969.

Name	Position	Nationality	Place of birth	Date of birth	Apps	Goals	Signed from	Date signed	Fee
Goalkeepers
Ernie Adams	GK	(England)	Hackney	17 January 1948 (aged 20)	50	0	(England) Arsenal	1 July 1967	Free transfer
Tony Macedo	GK	(Gibraltar)	Gibraltar	22 February 1938 (aged 30)	0	0	(England) Fulham	2 November 1968 (Note: Date of signing refers to the date of the player's first game for the club)	£6,000
Ron Willis	GK	(England)	Romford	27 December 1947 (aged 20)	0	0	(England) Charlton Athletic	October 1968	£1,500
Defenders
Dave Bickles	CB	(England)	West Ham	6 April 1944 (aged 24)	0	0	(England) Crystal Palace	28 September 1968	Free transfer
Micky Cook	FB	(England)	Enfield	9 April 1951 (aged 17)	0	0	(England) Orient	1 March 1969	Free transfer
Alan Dennis	CB	(England)	Colchester	22 February 1951 (aged 17)	0	0	Apprentice	April 1967	Free transfer
Brian Hall	LB	(England)	Burbage	9 March 1939 (aged 29)	154	16	(England) Mansfield Town	March 1965	Free transfer
Brian Honeywood	CB	(England)	Chelmsford	8 May 1949 (aged 19)	0	0	(England) Ipswich Town	August 1968	Free transfer
Bobby Howlett	CB	(England)	West Ham	12 December 1948 (aged 19)	0	0	(England) Southend United	Summer 1968	Free transfer
Dennis Mochan	FB	(Scotland)	Falkirk	12 December 1935 (aged 32)	81	2	(England) Nottingham Forest	24 September 1966	Free transfer
Owen Simpson	FB	(England)	Mickley	18 September 1943 (aged 24)	0	0	(England) Orient	10 August 1968	£3,500
Adrian Webster	DF	(England)	Colchester	6 November 1951 (aged 16)	0	0	Apprentice	July 1968	Free transfer
Brian Wood	CB	(England)	Hamworthy	8 December 1940 (aged 27)	0	0	(England) Orient	14 September 1968	£4,000
Midfielders
Roger Joslyn	MF	(England)	Colchester	7 May 1950 (aged 18)	12	0	Apprentice	23 December 1967	Free transfer
Forwards
Micky Brown	WG	(England)	Farnham Common	11 April 1944 (aged 24)	0	0	(England) Luton Town	26 October 1968	£3,000
Terry Dyson	WG	(England)	Malton	29 November 1934 (aged 33)	0	0	(England) Fulham	24 August 1968	Free transfer
Brian Gibbs	FW	(England)	Gillingham	6 October 1936 (aged 31)	0	0	(England) Gillingham	September 1968	£8,000
Danny Light	FW	(England)	Chiswick	10 July 1948 (aged 19)	0	0	(England) Crystal Palace	August 1968	£4,000
Johnny Martin	WG	(England)	Ashington	4 December 1946 (aged 21)	80	11	(England) Aston Villa	20 August 1966	Free transfer
Jim Oliver	FW	(Scotland)	Falkirk	3 December 1941 (aged 26)	15	0	(England) Brighton & Hove Albion	January 1968	£2,000
Terry Price	WG	(England)	Colchester	11 October 1945 (aged 22)	39	3	(England) Orient	16 September 1967	£2,000

== Transfers ==
=== In ===
Date	Position	Nationality	Name	From	Fee	Ref.
Summer 1968	CB	(England)	Bobby Howlett	(England) Southend United	Free transfer	
Summer 1968	FB	(England)	Gerry Perryman	(England) Northampton Town	Free transfer	
July 1968	CB	(England)	Colin Moughton	(England) Queens Park Rangers	Trial	
July 1968	DF	(England)	Adrian Webster	Apprentice	Free transfer	
August 1968	CB	(England)	Brian Honeywood	(England) Ipswich Town	Free transfer	
August 1968	FW	(England)	Danny Light	(England) Crystal Palace	£4,000	
10 August 1968	FB	(England)	Owen Simpson	(England) Orient	£3,500	(Note: Date of signing refers to the date of the player's first game for the club)
24 August 1968	WG	(England)	Terry Dyson	(England) Fulham	Free transfer	
September 1968	FW	(England)	Brian Gibbs	(England) Gillingham	£8,000	
14 September 1968	CB	(England)	Brian Wood	(England) Orient	£4,000	
28 September 1968	CB	(England)	Dave Bickles	(England) Crystal Palace	Free transfer	
October 1968	GK	(England)	Ron Willis	(England) Charlton Athletic	£1,500	
26 October 1968	WG	(England)	Micky Brown	(England) Luton Town	£3,000	
2 November 1968	GK	(Gibraltar)	Tony Macedo	(England) Fulham	£6,000	
16 November 1968	FW	(England)	Ken O'Rourke	(England) Arsenal	Trial	
November 1968	WG	(England)	Barry Rowan	(United States) Dallas Tornado	Free transfer	
1 March 1969	FB	(England)	Micky Cook	(England) Orient	Free transfer	

- Total spending: ▼ ~ £30,000

=== Out ===
Date	Position	Nationality	Name	To	Fee	Ref.
End of season	CB	(England)	Bob Walker	(England) Bedford Town	Free transfer	
End of season	WG	(England)	Alan Shires	(England) Chelmsford City	Released	
Summer 1968	WH	(England)	David Buck	(England) Halstead Town	Released	
Summer 1968	CB	(England)	Mick Loughton	(England) Brentwood Town	Released	
Summer 1968	MF	(Scotland)	Bobby Blackwood	(Scotland) Hawick Royal Albert	Player-manager	
Summer 1968	FW	(England)	Peter Bullock	(England) Exeter City	Free transfer	
Summer 1968	FW	(England)	Reg Stratton	(England) Brentwood Town	Free transfer	
26 August 1968	GK	(England)	Alan Buck	(England) Poole Town	Released	(Note: Date of departure refers to the date of the player's final game for the club)
26 August 1968	CB	(England)	Colin Moughton	(England) Bedford Town	End of trial	
September 1968	CB	(Scotland)	Duncan Forbes	(England) Norwich City	£10,000	
4 September 1968	FB	(England)	Gerry Perryman	(England) Corby Town	Free transfer	
4 September 1968	MF	(England)	John Mansfield	(England) Brentwood Town	Free transfer	
20 September 1968	MF	(England)	Derek Trevis	(England) Walsall	£11,000	
23 November 1968	FW	(England)	Ken O'Rourke	(England) Bedford Town	End of trial	
January 1969	WG	(England)	Barry Rowan	(South Africa) Durban United	Released	
February 1969	FW	(England)	Peter Barlow	(England) Workington	Free transfer	
28 February 1969	FW	(England)	Ken Hodgson	(England) Poole Town	Released	

- Total incoming: ▲ ~ £21,000

=== Loans in ===
Date	Position	Nationality	Name	From	End date	Ref.
31 August 1968	CB	(England)	Brian Wood	(England) Orient	7 September 1968	(Note: Loan start and end dates refer to the date of the player's first and final games for the club)
7 September 1968	GK	(Gibraltar)	Tony Macedo	(England) Fulham	26 October 1968	

=== Loans out ===
Date	Position	Nationality	Name	To	End date	Ref.
Early 1969	FW	(England)	Ken Hodgson	(England) Chelmsford City	February 1969	
January 1969	WG	(England)	Johnny Martin	(England) Chelmsford City	January 1969	

== Match details ==
=== Fourth Division ===
==== Results round by round ====
Round	1	2	3	4	5	6	7	8	9	10	11	12	13	14	15	16	17	18	19	20	21	22	23	24	25	26	27	28	29	30	31	32	33	34	35	36	37	38	39	40	41	42	43	44	45	46
Ground	A	H	A	H	H	H	A	A	H	A	H	A	A	H	A	H	H	A	A	H	H	A	A	H	A	A	A	H	H	A	A	H	H	A	H	A	H	H	A	A	H	H	H	H	A	A
Result	L	D	L	L	L	W	D	W	W	D	W	W	L	D	W	W	W	L	L	W	W	W	W	W	W	W	L	D	W	L	L	W	D	L	D	L	W	W	W	D	D	D	D	L	D	L
Position	21	22	23	24	24	24	23	21	13	14	12	10	15	14	13	10	6	9	12	8	9	8	6	7	2	3	4	4	2	3	6	4	3	6	4	6	4	2	2	2	2	2	2	3	3	5

Source: 11v11.com
A = Away; H = Home; W = Win; D = Draw; L = Loss

==== League table ====
Pos	Team	Pld	W	D	L	GF	GA	GAv	Pts	Promotion or relegation
4	Bradford City (P)	46	18	20	8	65	46	1.413	56	Promotion to the Third Division
5	Darlington	46	17	18	11	62	45	1.378	52	
6	Colchester United	46	20	12	14	57	53	1.075	52	
7	Southend United	46	19	13	14	78	61	1.279	51	
8	Lincoln City	46	17	17	12	54	52	1.038	51	

Source: rsssf.com
Rules for classification: 1) points; 2) goal average; 3) number of goals scored.
(P) Promoted

==== Matches ====
10 August 1968 1	Brentford	4–0	Colchester United	Brentford
	Deakin 3'; Moughton 60' (o.g.); Terry 73'; Ross 81'	Report		Stadium: Griffin Park; Attendance: 7,580; Referee: H New

17 August 1968 2	Colchester United	0–0	Rochdale	Colchester
		Report		Stadium: Layer Road; Attendance: 3,969; Referee: T Reynolds

24 August 1968 3	Chester	5–1	Colchester United	Chester
	Jones 6', 23'; Dearden 50'; Talbot 62'; Sutton 72'	Report	Simpson 23'	Stadium: Sealand Road; Attendance: 5,813; Referee: Clive Thomas

26 August 1968 4	Colchester United	0–4	Scunthorpe United	Colchester
		Report	Kerr 24', 68'; Heath 63'; Deere 88'	Stadium: Layer Road; Attendance: 3,771; Referee: John Homewood

31 August 1968 5	Colchester United	1–2	Doncaster Rovers	Colchester
	Simpson 90' (pen.)	Report	Webber 52'; Johnson 90'	Stadium: Layer Road; Attendance: 3,199; Referee: K Markham

7 September 1968 6	Colchester United	1–0	York City	Colchester
	Light 68'	Report		Stadium: Layer Road; Attendance: 3,756; Referee: Malcolm Sinclair

14 September 1968 7	Bradford City	1–1	Colchester United	Bradford
	Bannister 66'	Report	Light 32'	Stadium: Valley Parade; Attendance: 6,879; Referee: V Batty

16 September 1968 8	Chesterfield	0–2	Colchester United	Chesterfield
		Report	Gibbs 11'; Trevis 58'	Stadium: Saltergate; Attendance: 4,693; Referee: V James

20 September 1968 9	Colchester United	1–0	Port Vale	Colchester
	Joslyn 39'	Report		Stadium: Layer Road; Attendance: 6,441; Referee: Gordon Hill

28 September 1968 10	Exeter City	1–1	Colchester United	Exeter
	Banks 40'	Report	Simpson 2'	Stadium: St James Park; Attendance: 5,146; Referee: T Reynolds

4 October 1968 11	Colchester United	2–1	Grimsby Town	Colchester
	Gibbs 8', 77'	Report	Housing 29'	Stadium: Layer Road; Attendance: 7,543; Referee: Keith Walker

8 October 1968 12	Scunthorpe United	2–3	Colchester United	Scunthorpe
	Kerr 22'; Heath 68' (pen.)	Report	Gibbs 46', 64'; Bickles 83'	Stadium: Old Showground; Attendance: 2,748; Referee: Gordon Kew

12 October 1968 13	Newport County	1–0	Colchester United	Newport
	McClelland	Report		Stadium: Somerton Park; Attendance: 3,262; Referee: D Counsel

19 October 1968 14	Colchester United	0–0	Darlington	Colchester
		Report		Stadium: Layer Road; Attendance: 6,323; Referee: Ron Challis

26 October 1968 15	Lincoln City	0–3	Colchester United	Lincoln
		Report	Peden 36' (o.g.); Hall 44'; Oliver 65'	Stadium: Sincil Bank; Attendance: 6,833; Referee: H Williams

2 November 1968 16	Colchester United	2–1	Wrexham	Colchester
	Price 68'; Oliver 90+3'	Report	Smith 73'	Stadium: Layer Road; Attendance: 5,806; Referee: R Paine

4 November 1968 17	Colchester United	3–0	Workington	Colchester
	Light 36'; Oliver 57'; Price 71'	Report		Stadium: Layer Road; Attendance: 6,702; Referee: E Wallace

9 November 1968 18	Bradford Park Avenue	2–1	Colchester United	Bradford
	Brannan 39'; Gould 67'	Report	Oliver 5'	Stadium: Park Avenue; Attendance: 2,011

23 November 1968 19	Swansea Town	2–0	Colchester United	Swansea
	Gwyther 72'; Hall 85' (o.g.)	Report		Stadium: Vetch Field; Attendance: 5,080; Referee: D Smith

29 November 1968 20	Colchester United	4–0	Southend United	Colchester
	Oliver 12'; Simpson 56'; Gibbs 87'; Dyson 90' (pen.)	Report; Report		Stadium: Layer Road; Attendance: 10,604; Referee: R Barker

14 December 1968 21	Colchester United	2–1	Newport County	Colchester
	Light 23'; Wood 80'	Report	Deacy 27'	Stadium: Layer Road; Attendance: 3,532; Referee: J Yates

26 December 1968 22	Grimsby Town	2–4	Colchester United	Cleethorpes
	Oates 20'; Hickman 80'	Report	Oliver 31'; Bickles 63'; Light 71', 81'	Stadium: Blundell Park; Attendance: 5,559; Referee: H Davey

11 January 1969 23	Wrexham	0–3	Colchester United	Wrexham
		Report	Gibbs 20'; Light 29', 88'	Stadium: Racecourse Ground; Attendance: 7,471; Referee: Bob Matthewson

18 January 1969 24	Colchester United	3–0	Bradford Park Avenue	Colchester
	Hall 16'; Dyson 50' (pen.); Oliver 53'	Report		Stadium: Layer Road; Attendance: 5,914; Referee: Malcolm Sinclair

24 January 1969 25	Workington	0–1	Colchester United	Workington
		Report	Oliver 31'	Stadium: Borough Park; Attendance: 2,584; Referee: J Hill

1 February 1969 26	Aldershot	1–2	Colchester United	Aldershot
	Howarth 4'	Report	Gibbs 42'; Dyson 88'	Stadium: Recreation Ground; Attendance: 8,383; Referee: Ron Challis

14 February 1969 27	Southend United	3–1	Colchester United	Southend-on-Sea
	Moore 38'; Best 54', 78'	Report; Report	Light 84'	Stadium: Roots Hall; Attendance: 12,681; Referee: Keith Walker

22 February 1969 28	Colchester United	1–1	Notts County	Colchester
	Gibbs 67'	Report	Butlin 53'	Stadium: Layer Road; Attendance: 6,612; Referee: R Johnson

28 February 1969 29	Colchester United	2–1	Brentford	Colchester
	Joslyn 38'; Light 84'	Report	Neilson 15'; Terry (red card) 18'	Stadium: Layer Road; Attendance: 7,268; Referee: Tommy Dawes

4 March 1969 30	Halifax Town	2–1	Colchester United	Halifax
	Pearson 25'; Massie 31'	Report	Shawcross 16' (o.g.)	Stadium: The Shay; Attendance: 3,400; Referee: R Darlington

8 March 1969 31	Rochdale	4–0	Colchester United	Rochdale
	Jenkins 57'; Butler 75', 90'; Buck 82'	Report		Stadium: Spotland Stadium; Attendance: 4,988; Referee: J Thacker

10 March 1969 32	Colchester United	2–0	Aldershot	Colchester
	Hall; Light	Report		Stadium: Layer Road; Attendance: 6,577; Referee: John Homewood

14 March 1969 33	Colchester United	1–1	Chester	Colchester
	Oliver 90'	Report	Draper 17'	Stadium: Layer Road; Attendance: 7,312; Referee: R Kirkpatrick

22 March 1969 34	Doncaster Rovers	1–0	Colchester United	Doncaster
	Robertson 62'	Report		Stadium: Belle Vue; Attendance: 10,799; Referee: R Capey

24 March 1969 35	Colchester United	1–1	Lincoln City	Colchester
	Joslyn 71'	Report	Harford 71'	Stadium: Layer Road; Attendance: 6,787; Referee: D Lyden

29 March 1969 36	York City	2–0	Colchester United	York
	Boyer 14', 50'	Report		Stadium: Bootham Crescent; Attendance: 3,140; Referee: J Quinn

4 April 1969 37	Colchester United	1–0	Chesterfield	Colchester
	Brown 41'	Report		Stadium: Layer Road; Attendance: 7,180; Referee: H New

5 April 1969 38	Colchester United	1–0	Exeter City	Colchester
	Light 36'	Report		Stadium: Layer Road; Attendance: 5,650; Referee: M Fussey

8 April 1969 39	Peterborough United	0–1	Colchester United	Peterborough
		Report; Report	Brown 88'	Stadium: London Road Stadium; Attendance: 6,548

12 April 1969 40	Port Vale	0–0	Colchester United	Burslem
		Report		Stadium: Vale Park; Attendance: 3,774; Referee: F Cowan

14 April 1969 41	Colchester United	2–2	Peterborough United	Colchester
	Brown 25'; Bickles 56'	Report; Report	Price 43'; Hall 48'	Stadium: Layer Road; Attendance: 6,564; Referee: A Dimond

18 April 1969 42	Colchester United	1–1	Bradford City	Colchester
	Gibbs 47'	Report	Hall 52'	Stadium: Layer Road; Attendance: 8,196; Referee: R Paine

21 April 1969 43	Colchester United	0–0	Halifax Town	Colchester
		Report		Stadium: Layer Road; Attendance: 7,429; Referee: R Spittle

25 April 1969 44	Colchester United	0–1	Swansea Town	Colchester
		Report	Raybould 3'	Stadium: Layer Road; Attendance: 7,136; Referee: Norman Burtenshaw

28 April 1969 45	Darlington	1–1	Colchester United	Darlington
	Melling 4'	Report	Gibbs 71'	Stadium: Feethams; Attendance: 7,505; Referee: Alan Gunn

2 May 1969 46	Notts County	2–0	Colchester United	Nottingham
	Masson 26', 78'	Report		Stadium: Meadow Lane; Attendance: 3,576; Referee: W Castle

=== League Cup ===
14 August 1968 1st round	Colchester United	2–0	Reading	Colchester
	Hall 41'; Oliver 69' (pen.)	Report	Chapman (yellow card) 17' (red card) 72'	Stadium: Layer Road; Attendance: 3,824; Referee: J Yates

4 September 1968 2nd round	Colchester United	0–1	Workington	Colchester
		Report	Tyrer 35'	Stadium: Layer Road; Attendance: 3,523; Referee: I Hunting

=== FA Cup ===
16 November 1968 1st round	Colchester United	5–0	Chesham United	Colchester
	Light 34', 74'; Hall 49', 54'; Price 80'	Report		Stadium: Layer Road; Attendance: 5,497; Referee: R Johnson

7 December 1968 2nd round	Colchester United	0–1	Exeter City	Colchester
		Report	Banks 10'	Stadium: Layer Road; Attendance: 6,180; Referee: D Smith

== Squad statistics ==
=== Appearances and goals ===
No.	Pos	Nat	Player	Total		Fourth Division		FA Cup		League Cup	
No.	Pos	Nat	Player	Apps	Goals	Apps	Goals	Apps	Goals	Apps	Goals
	GK	(England) ENG	Ernie Adams	6	0	4	0	0	0	2	0
	GK	(Gibraltar) GIB	Tony Macedo	40	0	38	0	2	0	0	0
	GK	(England) ENG	Ron Willis	3	0	3	0	0	0	0	0
	DF	(England) ENG	Dave Bickles	35	3	34	3	1	0	0	0
	DF	(England) ENG	Brian Hall	50	6	46	3	2	2	2	1
	DF	(England) ENG	Brian Honeywood	21	0	12+6	0	1	0	2	0
	DF	(Scotland) SCO	Dennis Mochan	43	0	41	0	2	0	0	0
	DF	(England) ENG	Owen Simpson	45	4	41+2	4	1	0	1	0
	DF	(England) ENG	Brian Wood	30	1	28	1	2	0	0	0
	MF	(England) ENG	Roger Joslyn	41	3	37+1	3	1	0	2	0
	FW	(England) ENG	Micky Brown	22	3	17+3	3	1+1	0	0	0
	FW	(England) ENG	Terry Dyson	43	3	40+1	3	2	0	0	0
	FW	(England) ENG	Brian Gibbs	38	11	37	11	1	0	0	0
	FW	(England) ENG	Danny Light	45	14	42+1	12	2	2	0	0
	FW	(England) ENG	Johnny Martin	9	0	6+1	0	0	0	2	0
	FW	(Scotland) SCO	Jim Oliver	43	10	34+7	9	1	0	1	1
	FW	(England) ENG	Terry Price	24	3	19+2	2	1	1	2	0
Players who appeared for Colchester who left during the season
	GK	(England) ENG	Alan Buck	1	0	1	0	0	0	0	0
	DF	(Scotland) SCO	Duncan Forbes	8	0	6	0	0	0	2	0
	DF	(England) ENG	Colin Moughton	5	0	4	0	0	0	1	0
	DF	(England) ENG	Gerry Perryman	3	0	1+1	0	0	0	1	0
	MF	(England) ENG	John Mansfield	5	0	2+1	0	0	0	2	0
	MF	(England) ENG	Derek Trevis	10	1	8	1	0	0	2	0
	FW	(England) ENG	Peter Barlow	1	0	1	0	0	0	0	0
	FW	(England) ENG	Ken Hodgson	1	0	1	0	0	0	0	0
	FW	(England) ENG	Ken O'Rourke	2	0	1	0	1	0	0	0
	FW	(England) ENG	Barry Rowan	3	0	2	0	1	0	0	0

=== Goalscorers ===
Place	Nationality	Position	Name	Fourth Division	FA Cup	League Cup	Total
1	(England)	FW	Danny Light	12	2	0	14
2	(England)	FW	Brian Gibbs	11	0	0	11
3	(Scotland)	FW	Jim Oliver	9	0	1	10
4	(England)	LB	Brian Hall	3	2	1	6
5	(England)	FB	Owen Simpson	4	0	0	4
6	(England)	CB	Dave Bickles	3	0	0	3
6	(England)	WG	Micky Brown	3	0	0	3
6	(England)	WG	Terry Dyson	3	0	0	3
6	(England)	MF	Roger Joslyn	3	0	0	3
6	(England)	WG	Terry Price	2	1	0	3
11	(England)	MF	Derek Trevis	1	0	0	1
11	(England)	CB	Brian Wood	1	0	0	1
			Own goals	2	0	0	2
			TOTALS	57	5	2	64

=== Disciplinary record ===
Nationality	Position	Name	Fourth Division		FA Cup		League Cup		Total	
Nationality	Position	Name	Yellow card	Red card	Yellow card	Red card	Yellow card	Red card	Yellow card	Red card
(England)	FB	Owen Simpson	2	0	0	0	0	0	2	0
(England)	WG	Terry Dyson	1	0	0	0	0	0	1	0
(Scotland)	CB	Duncan Forbes	0	0	0	0	1	0	1	0
(Scotland)	FW	Jim Oliver	1	0	0	0	0	0	1	0
(England)	MF	Derek Trevis	0	0	0	0	1	0	1	0
		TOTALS	4	0	0	0	2	0	6	0

=== Clean sheets ===
Number of games goalkeepers kept a clean sheet.

Place	Nationality	Player	Fourth Division	FA Cup	League Cup	Total
1	(Gibraltar)	Tony Macedo	15	1	0	16
2	(England)	Ernie Adams	1	0	1	2
3	(England)	Ron Willis	1	0	0	1
		TOTALS	17	1	1	19

=== Player debuts ===
Players making their first-team Colchester United debut in a fully competitive match.

Position	Nationality	Player	Date	Opponent	Ground	Notes
CB	(England)	Brian Honeywood	10 August 1968	Brentford	Griffin Park	
CB	(England)	Colin Moughton	10 August 1968	Brentford	Griffin Park	
FB	(England)	Owen Simpson	10 August 1968	Brentford	Griffin Park	
FB	(England)	Gerry Perryman	24 August 1968	Chester	Sealand Road	
WG	(England)	Terry Dyson	24 August 1968	Chester	Sealand Road	
FW	(England)	Danny Light	24 August 1968	Chester	Sealand Road	
CB	(England)	Brian Wood	31 August 1968	Doncaster Rovers	Layer Road	
GK	(Gibraltar)	Tony Macedo	7 September 1968	York City	Layer Road	
CB	(England)	Brian Wood	14 September 1968	Bradford City	Valley Parade	(Note: Second debut for the club)
FW	(England)	Brian Gibbs	14 September 1968	Bradford City	Valley Parade	
CB	(England)	Dave Bickles	28 September 1968	Exeter City	St James Park	
WG	(England)	Micky Brown	26 October 1968	Lincoln City	Sincil Bank	
GK	(Gibraltar)	Tony Macedo	2 November 1968	Wrexham	Layer Road	
FW	(England)	Ken O'Rourke	16 November 1968	Chesham United	Layer Road	
GK	(England)	Ron Willis	23 November 1958	Swansea Town	Vetch Field	
WG	(England)	Barry Rowan	23 November 1958	Swansea Town	Vetch Field	

== See also ==
- List of Colchester United F.C. seasons
