= Dan Tana =

Serbian and American restaurateur and association football executive (1935–2025)

- Tana in 1969
- Born: Dobrivoje Tanasijević; May 26, 1935; Čibutkovica, Danube Banovina, Yugoslavia
- Died: August 16, 2025 (aged 90); Belgrade, Serbia
- Occupations: Restaurateur; actor; football executive and player
- Spouse(s): Andrea Wiesenthal (divorced) Biljana Strezovski (m. 2006)
- Children: Gabrielle Tana, Katerina Tana
- Parent(s): Lenka Milosevic mother, Radojko Tanasijevic father

Dobrivoje Tanasijević (Serbian Cyrillic: Добривоје Танасијевић; May 26, 1935 – August 16, 2025), known as Dan Tana, was a Serbian and American restaurateur, professional footballer, football administrator and executive, actor and producer.

Tana is best known as the proprietor of an eponymous restaurant, Dan Tana's, in West Hollywood, California, as well as being closely associated with football clubs Red Star Belgrade and Brentford F.C.

== Early life ==
Dobrivoje Tanasijević was born in 1935 to Serbian parents that had been residing in Belgrade. Dobrivoje's housewife mother Lenka Milošević gave birth in her home village of Čibutkovica near Lazarevac where she had temporarily moved to in order to stay with her parents while her kafana owner husband, Dobrivoje's father Radojko Tanasijević, was away serving his mandatory Royal Yugoslav Army stint.

Growing up on Kraljice Natalije Street near the Zeleni Venac open market in Belgrade, young Dobrivoje, nicknamed Bata, was a lively kid with a keen interest in football. With the outbreak of World War II in Yugoslavia following the April 1941 German invasion, Dobrivoje's father moved to the countryside, staying with his parents (Dobrivoje's grandparents) in order to avoid conscription. As a result, young Dobrivoje, who stayed in Belgrade with his mother, did not see his father for four years until the end of the war.

With the post-war transformation of Yugoslavia from a monarchy into a Titoist people's republic under the Communist Party (KPJ) rule of Josip Broz Tito, Dobrivoje's father Radojko, despite not participating in the war as part of any armed faction, was adjudged by the new communist authorities to be a class enemy and sentenced to 12 years in a labour camp while his pre-war kafana, Složna braća, was nationalized. The father ended up serving a year before being released and finding employment as an accountant in the now state-owned kafana that had been his before the war.

== Football career ==
=== Youth football at Red Star Belgrade ===
Tanasijević was spotted playing football at 12, and offered an apprenticeship with Red Star Belgrade. He spent five years at Red Star, developing as a striker.

=== Defection from Yugoslavia, playing with Anderlecht ===
Tanasijević was aged 17 when he toured Belgium in 1952 as part of the junior squad of the Yugoslav football team Red Star Belgrade to play R.S.C. Anderlecht. While in Brussels, Tana abandoned the team and stayed in Belgium.

While in Belgium, Tana saw the senior Red Star Belgrade team play Anderlecht, and was spotted in the crowd by the Red Star captain Rajko Mitić. Mitić told Anderlecht of Tanasijević's ability, and arranged a trial for Tanasijević with them. Anderlecht offered Tanasijević a four-year contract, but as a defector he could not play club football in Belgium for two years. Anderlecht loaned Tana to Hannover 96.

=== Canada ===
After spending six months on loan with Hannover, in the summer of 1955, he was offered a contract to play for Montreal Hakoah FC of the National Soccer League in Canada. Playing in Montreal, he won successive Canadian league titles and the Dominion Cup.

=== United States ===
Playing poker with a friend, Tanasijević won $5,000, after having bet $100 – everything they had. With his friend, Luca, Tanasijević decided to go to Hollywood but they had no valid passports. Luca was later taken away by men in a black limousine who Tana assumed were immigration officers. Tana faced the dilemma of whether to return to Canada to resume his football career or remain in the United States, with $10 to his name. He decided to remain in Hollywood and began working as a dishwasher.

Working as a dishwasher Tanasijević was recognized by a Serb who had seen him play in Canada. With no money, legal papers or a place to stay, the man offered Tanasijević a place to stay and Tanasijević eventually found his way to the Californian league football team Yugoslavian American. The team arranged a job for Tana in a local tuna cannery, and the football contract allowed him to stay in the United States legally.

Simultaneously, young Tanasijević began drama lessons with Jeff Corey in Malibu to improve his accent when speaking English as he tried to break into acting. The group of hopefuls attending Corey's classes with Tanasijević included young Natalie Wood, Kim Novak, and Angie Dickinson. Corey, a banned actor turned acting teacher after being blacklisted in Hollywood during the Second Red Scare (McCarthyism) witchhunt in the United States, thought Tanasijević's looks and accent might enable him to play 'bad guy roles' in films. Tanasijević, now going by Americanized Dan Tana, soon made his cinematic debut in the small part of a Nazi torpedo engineer in 1957's The Enemy Below, starring Curd Jürgens and Robert Mitchum. For the role Tana earned US$20,000 for eight weeks work, more than he ever had playing football. Tana also appeared in the films The Untouchables, Rin Tin Tin and Peter Gunn. He rejected an approach from Hannover to return to Europe to play football in 1960, as he was involved in the running of a nightclub, Peppermint West. Tana later became the general manager of the football team Los Angeles Toros and helped found the first professional soccer league in the United States.

== Hospitality career ==
Ever since first arriving in California in 1956, while attempting to transition professionally from playing football to acting, Tana took various odd jobs—working in a tuna cannery and washing dishes at the Villa Capri restaurant—as his main source of income. Gradually, unable to support himself from sporadic acting gigs, and unwilling to go back to Europe to continue pursuing his journeyman football playing career, Tana began working in hospitality. Living in a small apartment above Villa Capri, he continued working at the restaurant as a bus boy for its owner Pasquale "Patsy" D'Amore.

Tana then became involved in running a nightclub, Peppermint West, that catered to young patrons looking to partake in the twist craze.

In the early 1960s, Tana worked as the maître d' at a Beverly Hills restaurant, La Scala, owned by a Santander-born Basque immigrant to the U.S., Jean Leon, who had launched the spot in 1956 on North Canon Drive having had previously also worked for D'Amore at Villa Capri. While working for Leon at La Scala, Tana was part of the restaurant's staff that also included Matty "Matteo" Jordan, Joe Patti, and Piero Selvaggio each of whom would later go on to launch successful and long-running Italian restaurants of their own around the Los Angeles area. Jordan launched Matteo's in November 1963 on Westwood Boulevard in the L.A. neighbourhood of West Los Angeles that continued running even after his 1999 death under a different ownership. Selvaggio launched Valentino on Pico Boulevard in Santa Monica in December 1972 that ran for 46 years before closing in late 2018. Patti launched La Famiglia in late 1974 on North Canon Drive in Beverly Hills before closing almost two decades later in August 1994.

== In popular culture ==
Owing to Tana's friendship with television producers Aaron Spelling and E. Duke Vincent, both regulars at Dan Tana's, the two decided to name the main character in their 1978 U.S. television drama Vega$, Dan Tanna (played by Robert Urich), after the restaurateur. The series ran for three seasons with Tana reportedly receiving US$500 per airing (first-run episodes, re-runs, and syndication) in royalties, altogether making US$500,000 that he donated to charity.

The restaurant is referenced in movies such as Get Shorty and Hail, Caesar!, TV sitcom The Larry Sanders Show as well as in the songs "Small Clone" by Mayer Hawthorne, "But I Am A Good Girl" from the Burlesque soundtrack, and "Christmas in LA" by The Killers and Dawes.

== Association football executive career ==
=== Los Angeles Toros general manager ===
In 1967, more than a decade removed from his time as a professional footballer, an increasingly successful West Hollywood restaurateur Tana was hired to be the general manager of the newly established Los Angeles Toros franchise of the simultaneously newly launched National Professional Soccer League (NPSL), one of the first attempts at establishing a professional soccer league in the United States. Not sanctioned by FIFA but holding a two-year U.S. national television contract with CBS, the NPSL looked to cater to what at the time—following unexpectedly good U.S. television ratings of the 1966 FIFA World Cup final on NBC—seemed like large untapped soccer market in the country.

Due to being one of the rare NPSL executives maintaining active connections to individuals within European club football, Tana's involvement with the NPSL project went beyond just the franchise employing him, the Toros, as the new North American soccer league went about staffing nine other new franchises with players, coaches, and executives. Calling on his Yugoslavia football connections, Tana put the new Oakland Clippers NPSL franchise in touch with his former Red Star Belgrade boss, Aca Obradović, who would soon reach an agreement to become the Clippers general manager and in turn bring a head coach and number of Yugoslav footballers from Red Star, FK Partizan, and OFK Beograd to Oakland: head coach Ivan Toplak as well as players such as Ilija Mitić, Mirko Stojanović, Momčilo Gavrić, Dimitrije Davidović, Milan Čop, Ilija Lukić, Sele Milošević, and Dragan Đukić.

As for Tana's Toros soccer team—owned by Dan Reeves who had already been the owner of the NFL's Los Angeles Rams since 1941—it failed to gain a foothold into the L.A. sports scene, drawing only an average of 3,595 spectators to their home matches at the 93,000 capacity Los Angeles Memorial Coliseum.

Similarly, the NPSL project itself—facing competition from a simultaneously launched rival professional U.S. soccer league, the FIFA-affiliated United Soccer Association, whose inaugural season ran from late May until mid July 1967—folded after just one season via the two competing leagues merging to form the North American Soccer League (NASL). The Los Angeles Toros relocated to San Diego, becoming the San Diego Toros, ahead of their first season in the NASL.

=== Brentford F.C. chairman ===
In 1973, Tana moved to London, feeling that "... [he] had more to give to the game and to do that [he] had to be in a soccer culture. Football was calling [him] home." Meeting with the English playwright Willis Hall, Hall invited him to join a regular football gathering, which included broadcaster Michael Parkinson and the football personality Jimmy Hill. The manager of Brentford F.C., Frank Blunstone, attended the gatherings and invited Tana to watch Brentford play. Tana was subsequently asked to join the board of Brentford, a privilege for which Tana bought five shares at 50p each.

Brentford were at the bottom of the Fourth Division at the time of Tana's involvement and had large debts and poor attendance. Tana later said that he had had "...big ambitions for Brentford...At that time English football was in trouble...the hooligans and poor facilities made it a very poor form of entertainment for anyone but young men...[he] wanted to feel comfortable taking my wife and children to a game. In America 30 percent of the fans in stadia were female. Here it was about one percent. If America needed English football, England needed American facilities."

Tana became chairman of Brentford and they were promoted and turned a profit. He resigned from the Brentford board in 2002. Tana was also part of The Football Association's International Committee.

=== Return to Yugoslavia ===
In 1988, Tana was approached to join the Yugoslav Football Federation by his former teammate, Miljan Miljanić, then president of the federation. With Yugoslavia Tana attended the 1990 FIFA World Cup, and felt his loyalties divided between both England and Yugoslavia. Tana subsequently prepared a Yugoslav side for the 1992 UEFA European Championship, from which they were banned as a result of United Nations sanctions. Tana was elected to the board of Red Star Belgrade in 2000.

== Personal life and death ==
Tana had a summerhouse vacation villa on the Dalmatian island of Hvar in the Adriatic Sea in what is now Croatia. Designed by him and built during the time of SFR Yugoslavia, the vacation property housed many of his Hollywood friends, including basketball player Wilt Chamberlain. He was married twice, first to Andrea Wiesenthal; they had two daughters and later were divorced. In 2006, he married Biljana Strezovski.

Tana died from cancer at a hospital in Belgrade on August 16, 2025, at the age of 90.
