= Luis Mayoral =

Luis Mayoral may also refer to:

- Luis Mayoral (cyclist) (born 1937), Spanish cyclist
- Luis Mayoral (footballer) (born 1947), Spanish footballer
