= Mario Baesso =

Brazilian footballer (born 1945)

Personal information
- Full name: Mario Baesso Aparecido
- Date of birth: 5 September 1945 (age 81)
- Place of birth: São Paulo, Brazil
- Height: 1.70 m (5 ft 7 in)
- Position: Forward

Senior career*
| Years | Team | Apps | (Gls) |
| 1965–1967 | América-SP | ? | (?) |
| 1967–1968 | Oakland Clippers | 41 | (13) |
| 1968–1969 | Club América | ? | (?) |
| 1969 | California Clippers | 0 | (0) |
| 1969–1971 | C.D. Sonsonate | ? | (?) |
| 1972–1976 | Portuguesa FC | ? | (?) |
| 1977 | Volta Redonda | 6 | (0) |
| 1977 | Lota Schwager | 23 | (5) |
| 1978 | O'Higgins | 30 | (6) |
| 1980 | Deportes Iquique | 28 | (6) |
| 1981 | Vasco da Gama | 1 | (0) |
| 1982 | Desportiva-ES | 7 | (0) |
| 1983 | Deportivo Quevedo | ? | (?) |
- * Club domestic league appearances and goals

Mario Baesso Aparecido (born 5 September 1945) is a Brazilian former professional footballer who played as a forward.

== Career ==
Mario Baesso began his professional career playing for América-SP, a football club based in São José do Rio Preto (São Paulo state). From 1967 to 1968 has militated in the Oakland Clippers, with which he won the NPSL in 1967, beating in the final double to Baltimore Bays. In the course of 1968 arrives at Club America of Mexico. The year after returns to the Clippers with that plays some of exhibition games. In the same year 1969 arrived in the Salvadoran soccer to play on the C.D. Sonsonate, where he remained for two years.

In 1972 militates in Venezuelan club of Portuguesa FC and won the Venezuelan Championship and the Venezuela Cup. The year following returns home to play with the Volta Redonda. In the course of 1977 passes to the Chileans of Lota Schwager that will leave the following year to play with O'Higgins. In 1980 is to Deportes Iquique, always in Chile.

In 1981 returns home to play in the Vasco da Gama, where disputed only one meeting. The following year is to Desportiva-ES. In 1983 leaves the native country to play with Ecuadorians of Deportivo Quevedo.
