= Ilija Lukić =

Serbian footballer (1942–2018)

Personal information
- Date of birth: 21 January 1942
- Place of birth: Belgrade, Nazi-occupied Serbia
- Date of death: 13 June 2018 (aged 76)
- Position: Forward

Youth career
- Železnik

Senior career*
Years	Team	Apps	(Gls)
1962–1966	Priština		
1966	Partizan	0	(0)
1967–1968	Oakland Clippers	14	(2)
1969	Heracles	6	(0)
1969–1971	Rennes	32	(14)
1971–1972	Rouen	16	(8)
1973–1974	Rapid Lienz		
1975–1976	SW Bregenz		
1976–1977	Rita Berlaar		

Managerial career
- 1973-1974: Rapid Lienz (player-manager)
- 1975-1976: SW Bregenz (player-manager)
- 1976-1977: Rita Berlaar (player-manager)
- 1978-1979: Železnik
- 1979-1980: Srem
- 1980-1982: Kabwe Warriors
- 1982-1983: JS Kairouan
- 1983-1984: Yumco Vranje
- 1985-1986: Srem
- 1987-1989: Trudbenik
- 1990-1993: Al Wasl (assistant)
- 1995-1997: Ittihad (assistant)
- 1997-1998: Sharjah (assistant)
- 1998-2000: Ittihad (assistant)
- 1999-2001: Al Wahda (assistant)
- 2003: Al Ahli Jeddah
- 2005: Al Ahli Jeddah
- * Club domestic league appearances and goals

Ilija Lukić (Serbian Cyrillic: Илија Лукић; 21 January 1942 – 13 June 2018) was a Yugoslav footballer who played as a forward.

== Playing career ==
Lukić started playing in the youth teams of Belgrade's FK Železnik. In 1961, at age 19, he joined Second League FK Priština. That made attention turn to him and he signed with the FK Partizan that was having that season their historic achievement of reaching the 1966 European Cup final that they lost to Real Madrid. After not getting many opportunities to play, he was moving next season to the California based Oakland Clippers where he would help the club win the 1967 National Professional Soccer League. Next year, he was back to Europe first in Dutch club Heracles Almelo and, after a disappointing season there, to French Ligue 1 club Stade Rennais. He stayed four seasons there becoming very popular among the fans. During this time the club had their most enjoyable period, winning the French Cup in 1971. Following season he moved to another Ligue 1 club FC Rouen before moving to Austria where he was appointed player-manager of Second League Rapid Lienz. Eventually achieving their goal to play in the newly inaugurated Bundesliga, he finished his playing career as a player-manager of Belgian FC Berlaar.

== Coaching career ==
During his successful, 30-year coaching career, he worked in 13 different clubs, at eight countries on three continents.

He worked as an assistant to Dimitri Davidović in the Middle East and won four national championships: a treble with Al-Ittihad (Jeddah) in Saudi Arabia and one in UAE with Al Wasl. As the first coach of Al-Ittihad he also lifted four national cups in Saudi Arabia, and two in UAE, one with Al-Wasl and another with Sharjah FC. Together with Davidović he won in 1999 with Al-Ittihad the Asian Cup Winners Cup. As the manager of Al Ahli Jeddah he won in 2002 three big trophies: the Prince Faysal bin Fahad Tournament for Arab Clubs (later becoming the Arab Champions League, the Golf Club Champions Cup and Saudi Federation Cup.

He earned his degree in football from a Higher Coaching School of the Belgrade University's Faculty of Sport and Physical Education, as well as a Diploma from a University of California, San Francisco.

== Personal life ==
Lukić was married to Mirjana and had two children, a son Ivan and a daughter Maria.
