= Shimon Cohen =

Israeli footballer (born 1942)

Shimon Cohen שמעון כהן
Personal information
- Full name: Shimon Cohen
- Date of birth: October 15, 1942 (age 84)
- Place of birth: Tel Aviv, Mandatory Palestine
- Position: Striker

Senior career*
| Years | Team | Apps | (Gls) |
| 1959–1961 | Hapoel Tel Aviv | 13 | (0) |
| 1961–1970 | Shimshon Tel Aviv | 163 | (42) |
| 1967 | Baltimore Bays (loan) | 15 | (4) |
| 1970–1971 | Hapoel Petah Tikva | 22 | (4) |
| 1971–1976 | Beitar Tel Aviv | 113 | (10) |

International career
| 1962–1966 | Israel | 9 | (1) |
- * Club domestic league appearances and goals

Shimon Cohen (Hebrew: שמעון כהן) is an Israeli former professional association footballer who played for the Israel national team and the Baltimore Bays of the National Professional Soccer League.

Cohen played nine games, scoring one goal, with the Israel national team between 1962 and 1966. In 1967, he spent a single season on loan with the Baltimore Bays in the NPSL.
