= Luis Mayoral (footballer) =

Spanish footballer

Personal information
- Full name: Luis Mayoral Grande
- Date of birth: 10 August 1947 (age 79)
- Place of birth: Madrid, Spain
- Height: 1.83 m (6 ft 0 in)
- Position: Midfielder

Youth career
- 1966: Atlético Madrid
- Grenoble

Senior career*
Years	Team	Apps	(Gls)
1967	Baltimore Bays	5	(1)
1968	Boston Beacons	5	(0)
1970–1971	Elche	4	(0)
1971–1973	Pontevedra	3	(0)
1975–1976	Albacete Balompié		
- * Club domestic league appearances and goals

Luis Mayoral Grande (born 10 August 1947) is a Spanish former footballer, who plays for Baltimore Bays as a midfielder. He was professional from 1967 until 1976. He spent the better part of his youth career with Atlético Madrid after starting out at Grenoble. He moved to Albacete Balompié in 1975. He worked for Elche, with which he relegated to the end of La Liga in 1970–1971. He retired at the age of 29.

== Biography ==
Luis Mayoral was born in Madrid, Spain on 10 August 1947. He was formed at Baltimore Bays. He earned five caps for the Baltimore Bays. He later played for Pontevedra and Albacete Balompié.
