= Ivan Borodiak =

American soccer player

Ivan "John" Borodiak
Personal information
- Full name: Ivan Borodiak
- Date of birth: July 13, 1936
- Place of birth: Buenos Aires, Argentina
- Date of death: September 13, 2025 (aged 89)
- Height: 1.87 m (6 ft 1 1/2 in)
- Position: Full back

Senior career*
| Years | Team | Apps | (Gls) |
| 1958–1959 | Talleres (RE) | | |
| 1959 | Almagro | | |
| 1960–1966 | Philadelphia Ukrainians | | |
| 1965 | Toronto Roma | | |
| 1966–1967 | Newark Ukrainian Sitch | | |
| 1967–1968 | Philadelphia Spartans | 12 | (0) |
| 1968 | Cleveland Stokers | 26 | (0) |
| 1969 | Baltimore Bays | | |

International career
| 1964 | United States | 1 | (0) |
- * Club domestic league appearances and goals

Iván "John" Borodiak (July 13, 1936 – September 13, 2025) was a soccer player who played as a defender in the American Soccer League and the North American Soccer League. Born in Argentina, he also earned one cap for the United States national team.

== Professional ==
Born on July, 13, 1936, in Buenos Aires, Argentina, of Ukrainian descent, Borodiak started his career in the Argentine league, playing for Talleres de Remedios de Escalada, and later for Almagro. In early 1960, the Philadelphia Ukrainian Nationals of the American Soccer League (ASL) signed Borodiak to bolster the squad for an upcoming National Challenge Cup series. The move paid off, and the Ukes won the 1960, 1961, 1963 and 1967 National Challenge Cups. In 1965, during the ASL off season, he played in the Eastern Canada Professional Soccer League with Toronto Roma. In 1967, he played for the Newark Ukrainian Sitch and Philadelphia Spartans. In 1968, Borodiak signed with the Cleveland Stokers of the North American Soccer League. The next year, he transferred to the Baltimore Bays. That season, he was a first team NASL All Star.

== National team ==
Borodiak earned one cap with the U.S. national team in a 10–0 loss to England on May 27, 1964.

== Later life and death ==
After retiring from professional playing in 1970, Borodiak coached soccer and played with amateur teams into his 40s. He earned certification in dental cosmetics at Temple University in the 1960s, and owned a dental lab in Philadelphia until he retired in 2018. He died on September 13, 2025.
