= Dan Tana's =

Italian restaurant in California

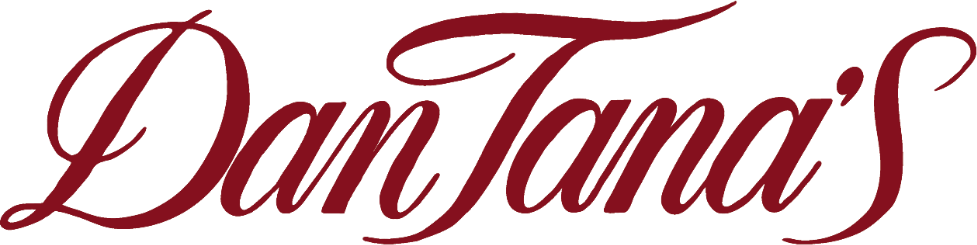

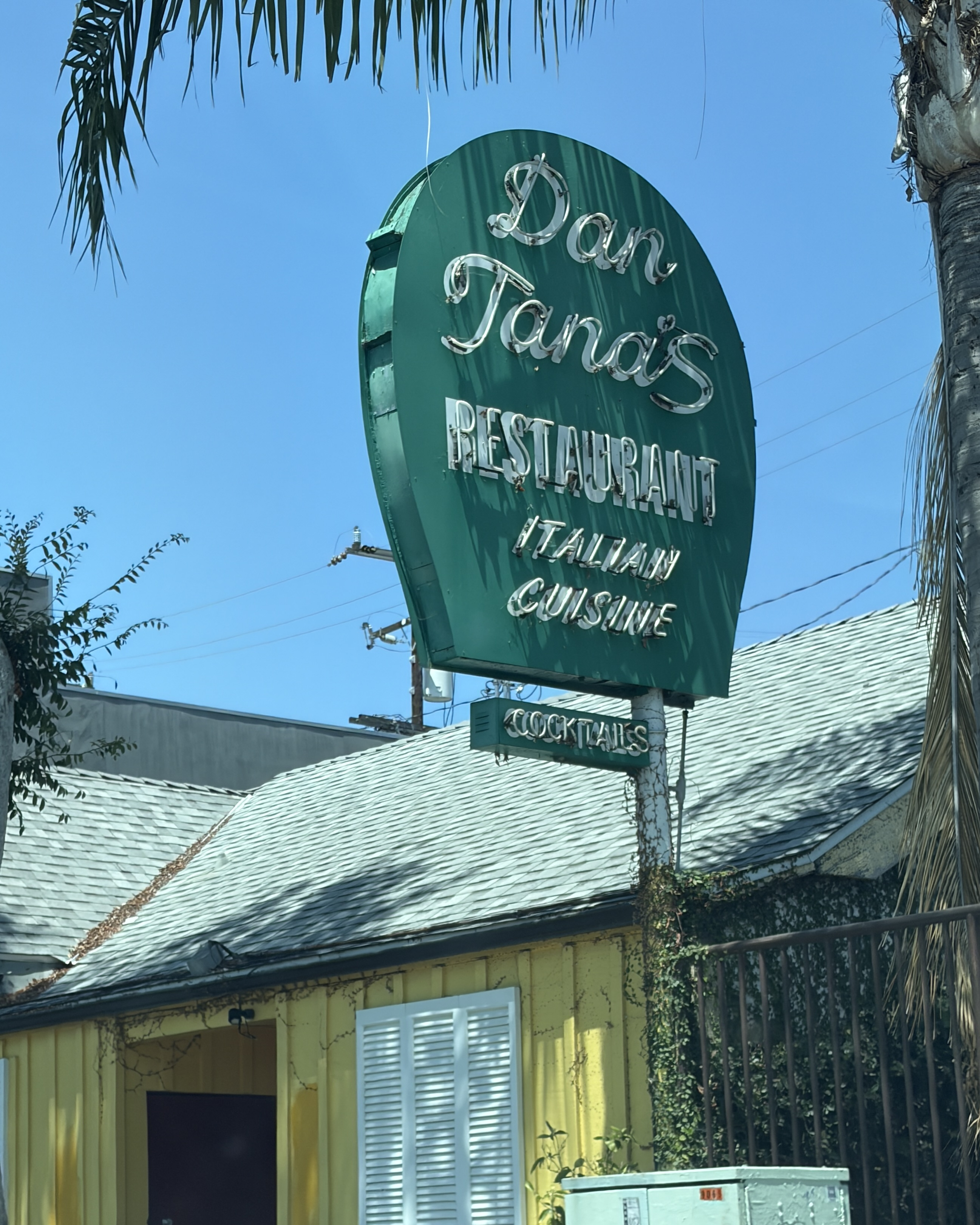
- The restaurant in 2026
- Interactive map of Dan Tana's

Restaurant information
- Established: 1964; 62 years ago
- Owners: Mihajlo and Sonja Perenčević (2009–present)
- Previous owner: Dan Tana (1964–2009)
- Food type: Italian
- Location: 9071 Santa Monica Boulevard, West Hollywood, California, 90069, US
- Coordinates: 34.081757°N 118.389053°W
- Website: dantanasrestaurant.com

Dan Tana's is an Italian restaurant in West Hollywood, California. Founded by former professional footballer and restauranteur Dan Tana in 1964, it is known for its celebrity clientele.

== History ==
In 1964, twenty-nine-year-old Tana launched his own eatery by taking over the Dominick's hamburger restaurant on Santa Monica Boulevard in West Hollywood from an art-gallerist friend Chuck Feingarten for US$30,000 (US$287,000 in 2023) with a three-year payment schedule of US$10,000 annually. For decades prior, the location had also housed food hospitality venues: first, Black's Lucky Spot Café counter-style lunch joint catering to the workers doing maintenance on the Pacific Electric's old Red Car Trolley that ran outside along Santa Monica Blvd. until the 1950s, followed by Domenico's Lucky Spot. Tana originally named his newly acquired venue after his adopted last name only, Tana's, changing its concept to New York City–style Italian dinner spot with a small bar and hiring chef Michele Diguglio to run the kitchen. Tana's infectious personality and personal touch soon garnered a loyal clientele and he became synonymous with the restaurant, with his customers affectionately referring to the restaurant as Dan Tana's. Tana changed the name to refer to his full name shortly thereafter.

Housed in a 1929 bungalow a few doors down from the Troubadour nightclub, the newly launched 20-table restaurant's best received features initially were its steak and unpretentious atmosphere. Described as "resolutely untrendy" while offering classic Italian pasta dishes such as fettuccine, lasagna, and eggplant parmesan, the new dinner restaurant on Santa Monica Boulevard would start becoming a favourite Hollywood hangout two years into its operation, after struggling for a steady clientele at first. Attempting to supplement the insufficient revenue the new restaurant was generating, Tana looked for investors among the celebrity friends and acquaintances he had already made through his previous jobs in hospitality around Los Angeles, even offering a 50% ownership stake in Dan Tana's for US$15,000 to the baseball legend Joe DiMaggio who came in to eat one night with a friend, movie producer Sidney Beckerman. Both turned Tana down. Simultaneously, the owner continuously tried to generate some celebrity buzz for the restaurant by inviting friends/acquaintances such as Robert Mitchum, Cary Grant, Glenn Ford, etc. to drop by, but very few actually showed up.

Tana credited a 1966 enthusiastic review in the high-circulation Los Angeles Times—calling Tana's the "discovery of the year" and the "best new Italian restaurant in the city"—with its first big spike in business at a time when it barely made a profit. Prior to the effusive 1966 Los Angeles Times review, the restaurant had reportedly been doing about 25 dinners per night, however, after the review, the number increased to 200 dinners per night. Benefiting from its proximity to the Academy of Motion Picture Arts and Sciences (AMPAS) headquarters at the Marquis Theater just around the corner on Melrose Avenue, Dan Tana's emerged as a spot for the film industry personalities and professionals to commingle. As a result of the increased demand, Tana had to hire a lot more staff as the restaurant only had two waiters and one bartender.

By 1967, Dan Tana's was already established among the entertainment industry insiders—and hopefuls looking to break in—as the "right place" in town to be seen and make social connections that could be leveraged into business ones. Resisting the then-popular practice of restaurant staff bringing telephones to the tables as per customer requests, Tana insisted—even after vociferous protestation from an infuriated Universal Pictures studio executive Ned Tanen—on a relaxed ambiance allowing customers to eat in relative anonymity.

In 1968, Tana hired fellow Yugoslav, Miljenko "Michael" Gotovac, initially as a waiter before moving to bartender; Gotovac—a Croat born in 1943 in the village of Lećevica before leaving Communist Yugoslavia in 1964 as a young gastarbeiter to West Germany and eventually arriving in the U.S. in 1967—would go on to become one of Dan Tana's staples for the following 52 years, displaying a gruff, big-hearted personality while tending the bar and pouring drinks in what some saw as curmudgeonly fashion.

Chef Diguglio left after five years, in 1969, at which point Tana hired another fellow Yugoslav, Mate Mustać, who had been working on Italian cruise ships, as the new chef.

Into the 1970s, already frequented by a great number of film industry individuals—from major showbusiness eminences such as John Wayne, Kirk Douglas, Karl Malden, and studio boss Lew Wasserman to emerging New Hollywood personalities such as Harry Dean Stanton, Jack Nicholson, screenwriter Carole Eastman, and director Bob Rafelson—the eatery was embraced by the hugely popular television personality Johnny Carson after he moved his highly rated nightly program The Tonight Show to the West Coast in 1972. While conducting an interview on the show with Richard Burton—another Dan Tana's regular who had been playfully complaining about being turned away from the eatery—Carson even proclaimed Dan Tana's to be his favourite restaurant in Los Angeles.

As a result of the nearby Troubadour club beginning to book big stars like Elton John and Van Morrison, Dan Tana's did away with its customary 11 p.m. closing time, keeping its kitchen open late until 12:30 or 1 a.m. in order to cater to the concert-goers looking for a late-night dining spot after the shows ended. As the restaurant gained in popularity, owner Tana refused to undertake large expansion or open additional locations, stating in a 1997 interview that "if you really want to be successful with a restaurant, you can have only one—it's like a wife".

Due to its location next to the Troubadour nightclub, Dan Tana's also saw many musicians come in to eat and drink over the decades, including members of The Byrds, The Mamas & the Papas, and the Eagles as well as Frank Zappa, Elton John, and Bette Midler. The Eagles' guitarist Glenn Frey and drummer Don Henley were said to have been inspired into writing their 1975 hit "Lyin' Eyes" after once eating at Dan Tana's while "observing the many beautiful women in the restaurant, many of whom were with much older wealthy men".

In the early morning hours of 1 August 1980, a fire burned down almost the entire restaurant. Tana received an outpouring of support from regulars encouraging him to rebuild Dan Tana's just the way it was. Some of them, such as singer Linda Ronstadt starring at the time in a Broadway staging of The Pirates of Penzance, went even further; upon hearing of Tana facing a multiple-month delay just to get building permits approved by the city, she asked her boyfriend, California governor Jerry Brown to help. As a result of Ronstadt and governor Brown intervening, the restaurant was able to re-open in six weeks.

In the early 1980s, Tana hired Mike Miljković to be the restaurant's general manager and Jimmy Cano as its maître d'.

In 1988, yet another Yugoslav, Neno Mladenović (a Split-born Croat), joined as a cook working under chef Mustać; eventually, during early 2000s, Mladenović would replace Mustać as chef. The same year, Tana hired a young aspiring actor, Craig Susser, as a waiter; Susser would end up staying at Dan Tana's for the following 23 years: first as waiter and weekend bartender before being promoted in 2002 to maitre d' and manager.

By the late 1980s, already running for 25 years, Dan Tana's continued attracting glamorous Hollywood patrons. In a 1989 Los Angeles Times review, the restaurant was described as hosting "plenty of flesh and hair, lots of dames and a movie crowd that looks as if it was costumed for a film noir" with "plenty of two-cheek kissy-kissy stuff going on from table to table, the way they do in Rome or Cannes".

Since accumulating a number of regulars over decades, Dan Tana's began naming dishes after them thus offering veal Jerry Weintraub, scaloppine Karl Malden, braciola Vlade Divac, chopped salad Nicky Hilton, steak Dabney Coleman, and shrimp scampi Jerry Buss.

In 2009, Tana sold his restaurant to Croatian tycoon Mihajlo Perenčević and his wife Sonja, providing they kept the name of the restaurant. Since their divorce, the restaurant has been in the sole ownership of Sonja Perenčević.

Perenčević continues Tana's commitment to the community, with proceeds from the restaurant's 50th and 60th anniversaries donated to St. Jude Children's Research Hospital and Children's Hospital Los Angeles, include the sale of a print donated by Tana's ex-wife Andrea Tana (née Wiesenthal).
