= Brian Honeywood =

English footballer (1949–2024)

Personal information
- Full name: Brian Roy Honeywood
- Date of birth: 8 May 1949
- Place of birth: Chelmsford, England
- Date of death: 3 March 2024 (aged 74)
- Place of death: Chelmsford, England
- Position: Defender

Youth career
- Chelmsford City
- 1965–1968: Ipswich Town

Senior career*
Years	Team	Apps	(Gls)
1968–1969	Colchester United	17	(0)
1969–1970	Chelmsford City	31	(0)
- Canterbury City

Managerial career
- 1978: Chelmsford City (caretaker)
- 1989–1992: Braintree Town (joint)
- * Club domestic league appearances and goals

Brian Roy Honeywood (8 May 1949 – 3 March 2024) was an English footballer who played in the Football League as a defender for Colchester United.

== Club career ==
Born in Chelmsford, Honeywood played for hometown club Chelmsford City as an apprentice, before joining Ipswich Town, going on to make 100 youth team appearances and 46 reserve team appearances, however Honeywood never broke into the first-team at the club.

Honeywood joined Colchester United in the summer of 1968, making his first-team debut on the opening day of the 1968–69 season, a 4–0 loss to Brentford on 10 August 1968. Honeywood went on to make 18 league appearances during his single season with the club. He made his final appearance in the final game of the season on 2 May 1969, a 2–0 away defeat to Notts County before joining Chelmsford City in 1969.

At Chelmsford, Honeywood made 51 appearances in all competitions during the 1969–70 season as the club finished third in the Southern League. Following his release at the end of the campaign, Honeywood signed for Canterbury City, before retiring to focus on his hairdressing business.

== Managerial career ==
Following the resignation of Ollie Hopkins as Chelmsford City manager in November 1978, Honeywood was appointed caretaker manager of the club. Honeywood presided over two games as caretaker manager for Chelmsford, losing 5–0 against Dover in the Southern League and losing 10–2 against Barking in the FA Trophy. Following the defeat against Barking, Chelmsford's heaviest defeat in the club's history, Honeywood was replaced as caretaker manager by Don Walker, who also acted as caretaker manager, before the appointment of former Billericay Town manager John Newman in a permanent capacity.

Honeywood later managed Braintree Town alongside Peter Collins, before leaving in 1992. Together the pair managed 120 games for Braintree over the course of three years.

Following his time at Braintree, Honeywood acted as director of football for Chelmsford City during Gary Bellamy's management of the club. Honeywood was later director of football at Maldon Town.

== Personal life ==
Following his playing career, Honeywood worked for Professional Active Soccer Schools (PASS) as a coach alongside his son Lee, who was also on the books with Ipswich, but also failed to break into the first-team at the club, being forced to retire early through injury.

In March 2024, Chelmsford City announced Honeywood had died. He was 74.
