= Mirko Stojanović =

Croatian footballer (born 1936)

Personal information
- Date of birth: 11 June 1939 (age 87)
- Place of birth: Zagreb, Kingdom of Yugoslavia
- Height: 1.83 m (6 ft 0 in)
- Position: Goalkeeper

Youth career
- Lovćen

Senior career*
Years	Team	Apps	(Gls)
1958–1961	Dinamo Zagreb	21	(0)
1962–1966	Red Star Belgrade	65	(0)
1967–1968	Oakland Clippers	59	(0)
1971	Dallas Tornado	16	(0)
1972–1973	Olimpija Ljubljana	8	(0)
1974–1975	San Jose Earthquakes	6	(0)
1975	San Jose Earthquakes (indoor)		

International career
1961–1964	Yugoslavia	4	(0)

Managerial career
- 1978: Oakland Stompers
- * Club domestic league appearances and goals

Mirko Stojanović (born 11 June 1939 in Zagreb) is a Croatian retired footballer. In his career, he made four international appearances for the Yugoslavia national team.

== Playing career ==
=== Club ===
While playing for NK Dinamo Zagreb he won the 1959–60 Yugoslav Cup. In 1963–64 while at Red Star Belgrade he won both the Yugoslav First League title and his second Yugoslav Cup. After moving to the United States he won the titles with Oakland in 1967, Dallas in 1971 and an indoor title with San Jose in 1975.

=== International ===
Stojanović made his debut for Yugoslavia in a November 1961 friendly match away against Japan, coming on as a 46th-minute substitute for Milutin Šoškić, and earned a total of 4 caps, scoring no goals. He was an unused substitute for Yugoslavia at the 1962 FIFA World Cup, in which they placed fourth. His final international was a May 1964 friendly away against Czechoslovakia.

== Managerial career ==
He was the original coach of the Oakland Stompers before being fired after only eight games and a record of four wins and four losses. He stayed on as the team's director of player personnel

== Honors ==
NK Dinamo Zagreb

- 1959–60 Yugoslav Cup

Red Star Belgrade

- 1963–64 Yugoslav First League
- 1963–64 Yugoslav Cup

Oakland Clippers

- 1967 NPSL Champion

Dallas Tornado

- 1971 NASL Champion

San Jose Earthquakes

- 1975 NASL Indoor Champion
