= Gerry Perryman =

English footballer

Personal information
- Full name: Gerald Perryman
- Date of birth: 3 October 1947 (age 79)
- Place of birth: West Haddon, England
- Height: 5 ft 7 in (1.70 m)
- Position: Full-back

Youth career
- Northampton Town

Senior career*
Years	Team	Apps	(Gls)
1966–1968	Northampton Town	1	(0)
1968	Colchester United	2	(0)
- Corby Town
- Rushden Town
Total		3	(0)
- * Club domestic league appearances and goals

Gerald Perryman (born 3 October 1947) is an English former footballer who played in the Football League as a full-back for Northampton Town and Colchester United.

== Career ==
Born in West Haddon, Perryman signed professional terms with Northampton Town in September 1966, making just one league appearance at the County Ground. He moved to Colchester United in the summer of 1968, and made only two league appearances for the U's, his debut a 5–1 defeat to Chester at Sealand Road on 24 August 1968 as a substitute for Dennis Mochan. He made his final league appearance in the following game, again standing in for Mochan in a 4–0 defeat by Scunthorpe United at Layer Road. His final game for the club was a League Cup defeat to Workington on 4 September. Unimpressed by the squad he had inherited since joining in the summer, manager Dick Graham took drastic action, axing a number of players, Perryman included. Perryman would later represent non-league sides Corby Town and Rushden Town.
