= Colin Moughton =

English footballer

Personal information
- Full name: Colin Edward Moughton
- Date of birth: 30 December 1947 (age 78)
- Place of birth: Harrow, London, England
- Height: 6 ft 0 in (1.83 m)
- Position: Defender

Youth career
- Queens Park Rangers

Senior career*
Years	Team	Apps	(Gls)
1965–1968	Queens Park Rangers	6	(0)
1968	Colchester United	4	(0)
- Bedford Town
- Cheltenham Town
- Gloucester City
Total		10	(0)
- * Club domestic league appearances and goals

Colin Edward Moughton (born 30 December 1947) is an English former footballer who played in the Football League as a defender for Queens Park Rangers and Colchester United.

== Career ==
Born in Harrow, London, Moughton began his career with Queens Park Rangers, signing professional terms in December 1965. He made six appearances for the club between 1965 and 1968 prior to joining Colchester United on a two-month trial in July 1968.

Moughton made his debut for Colchester in a 4–0 defeat to Brentford at Griffin Park on 10 August 1968, the opening match of the season and a game in which he scored an unfortunate own goal. He made four appearances in the league for the U's but was not signed permanently, making his final appearance in another 4–0 defeat, on this occasion at home to Scunthorpe United. He later joined Bedford Town, Cheltenham Town and Gloucester City.
