= Eddie Presland =

English cricketer and footballer (1943–2021)

Personal information
- Full name: Edward Robert Presland
- Date of birth: 27 March 1943
- Place of birth: Loughton, England
- Date of death: 1 August 2021 (aged 78)
- Place of death: Gateshead, England
- Position: Defender

Youth career
- –1960: West Ham United

Senior career*
| Years | Team | Apps | (Gls) |
| 1960–1967 | West Ham United | 6 | (1) |
| 1967–1969 | Crystal Palace | 61 | (0) |
| 1969 | → Colchester United (loan) | 5 | (0) |
- Chelmsford City
- Jewish Guild
- Wealdstone

Managerial career
- Wealdstone
- Dulwich Hamlet
- Hendon
- Gravesend and Northfleet
- Dulwich Hamlet
- 1980–?: Dagenham
- Cricket career
Cricket information
- Batting: Right-handed
- Bowling: Right arm medium, off-break
Domestic team information
- Years: Team
- 1962–1970: Essex
Career statistics
| Competition | FC | LA |
|---|---|---|
| Matches | 30 | 24 |
| Runs scored | 625 | 187 |
| Batting average | 16.89 | 12.46 |
| 100s/50s | 0/1 | 0/0 |
| Top score | 51 | 38 |
| Balls bowled | 1,081 | 253 |
| Wickets | 13 | 3 |
| Bowling average | 58.53 | 50.66 |
| 5 wickets in innings | 0 | 0 |
| 10 wickets in match | 0 | n/a |
| Best bowling | 2/19 | 1/28 |
| Catches/stumpings | 24/– | 9/– |
- Source: Cricinfo, 15 February 2011
- * Club domestic league appearances and goals

Edward Robert Presland (27 March 1943 – 1 August 2021) was an English footballer who played as a defender in England for West Ham United, Crystal Palace, Colchester United, Chelmsford City and Wealdstone and for Jewish Guild in South Africa. He was manager of Wealdstone, Dulwich Hamlet, Hendon, Gravesend and Northfleet and Dagenham. He also played first-class and List A cricket for Essex.

== Club career ==
Presland started as a junior for West Ham United before signing as a professional in October 1960. He did not make his debut until 27 February 1965 in a 2–1 home win against Liverpool in which he scored his only goal for West Ham. He made only six appearances for West Ham before moving to Crystal Palace in 1967. He had a spell on-loan with Colchester United signing on 11 October 1969. He made his Colchester United debut on the same day in a 2–1 home win against Bradford Park Avenue. He made only six appearances for Colchester in all competitions, his last being in November 1969. After leaving Crystal Palace he played for Chelmsford City, Jewish Guild in South Africa and Wealdstone.

== Managerial career ==
On his return from South Africa Presland played for Wealdstone and moved on to manage the club. Similar roles followed with Dulwich Hamlet, Hendon, Gravesend and Northfleet, again with Dulwich Hamlet before moving to Dagenham as a coach. In 1980, he became their manager and led them to their victory in the 1980 FA Trophy Final with Dagenham beating Mossley 2–1 at Wembley. He was sacked almost immediately after the victory and then left football for a time before returning as a scout for Ipswich Town, West Ham and Tottenham Hotspur. As a scout for Tottenham, Presland played a central role in the recruitment of players Gareth Bale and Luka Modrić.

== Cricket career ==
Presland played 30 first-class and 24 List A matches for Essex between 1962 and 1972. His highest score was 51 against Northamptonshire in 1967.

== Personal life ==
Presland was good friends with fellow footballer Geoff Hurst, serving as best man at his wedding in 1964.

== Death ==
On 1 August 2021, at the age of 78, Presland died of cancer at Queen Elizabeth Hospital, Gateshead.
