= Andy White (footballer, born 1948) =

Welsh footballer

Personal information
- Full name: Andrew Charles John White
- Date of birth: 6 November 1948 (age 77)
- Place of birth: Newport, Wales
- Position: Winger

Senior career*
Years	Team	Apps	(Gls)
?–1969	Caerleon	?	(?)
1969–1977	Newport County	254	(26)
1977–?	Minehead	?	(?)
Total		254	(26)
- * Club domestic league appearances and goals

Andrew Charles John White (born 6 November 1948) is a Welsh former footballer who played as a winger. He played for Newport County in the Football League.

== Career ==
Born in Newport, Monmouthshire, White joined hometown club Newport County in August 1969 from local club Caerleon. He went on to make 254 appearances in the Football League for Newport, scoring 26 goals. In 1977, he joined Minehead.
