= Steve Pitt =

English footballer

Personal information
- Full name: Stephen William Pitt
- Date of birth: 1 August 1948 (age 78)
- Place of birth: Willesden, England
- Position: Winger

Senior career*
Years	Team	Apps	(Gls)
1965–1969	Tottenham Hotspur	1	(0)
1969	Colchester United	6	(0)
- Corinthian-Casuals
- Stevenage Borough
- * Club domestic league appearances and goals

Stephen William Pitt (born 1 August 1948) is an English former professional footballer who played for Tottenham Hotspur, Colchester United, Corinthian Casuals and Stevenage Borough .

== Playing career ==
Pitt joined Tottenham Hotspur as an apprentice in August 1965. The winger featured in one match for the Spurs in a home fixture versus Blackpool on 26 August 1965. Pitt was aged 17 years and 26 days making him one of the youngest Tottenham debutants. He transferred to Colchester United in June 1969 where he played in six senior matches. After leaving Layer Road, Pitt had spells at Corinthian Casuals and Stevenage Borough.
