= Peter Price (footballer, born 1949) =

Welsh footballer (born 1949)

Personal information
- Full name: Peter William Price
- Date of birth: 17 August 1949 (age 77)
- Place of birth: Wrexham, Wales
- Position: Inside forward

Youth career
- ????–1966: Liverpool

Senior career*
Years	Team	Apps	(Gls)
1966–1968	Liverpool	0	(0)
1968–1972	Peterborough United	119	(62)
1972–1974	Portsmouth	14	(2)
1974	→ Peterborough United (loan)	2	(0)
1974–1978	Barnsley	79	(28)
Total		214	(92)

International career
1970–1971	Wales U23	4	
- * Club domestic league appearances and goals

Peter Price (born 17 August 1949) is a Welsh former professional footballer who played professionally in England during the 1960s and 1970s.

== Career ==
=== Early career ===
Price was one of that generation who bridged the gap between terminological eras, beginning his career as an inside forward and ending it as a striker despite playing a similar role throughout. He began his career as a youth at Liverpool, signing a full-time professional contract in 1966.

=== Peterborough United ===
In 1968, having failed to break into the Liverpool first team, he joined Peterborough United, for whom he scored 62 goals in 119 appearances.

=== Portsmouth ===
In 1972, Price signed for Portsmouth. Hampered by a back injury, he struggled to establish himself in the side, eventually leaving Fratton Park to return to his former club two years later.

=== Barnsley ===
He ended his career at Barnsley, making his final appearance in the spring of 1978.

== International career ==
While at Peterborough, Price played for the Welsh under-23 side, scoring the winning goal against Scotland at Swansea City's Vetch Field ground.
