= Jeff Thomas (footballer) =

Welsh footballer

Personal information
- Full name: Jeff Thomas
- Date of birth: 18 May 1949 (age 77)
- Place of birth: Newport, Wales
- Position: Right winger

Senior career*
Years	Team	Apps	(Gls)
1965–1973	Newport County	210	(31)
- Cwmbran Town

International career
- Wales under-23
- * Club domestic league appearances and goals

Jeff Thomas (born 18 May 1949 in Newport) is a Welsh former professional footballer. A pacey winger, he progressed through the youth team at Newport County making his first team debut in 1965. He went on to make 209 appearances for Newport scoring 31 goals before retiring in 1973.

In 1971 Thomas was selected for the Football Association of Wales tour of Tahiti, New Zealand, Australia and Malaysia but these matches were not classed as international cap matches. Thomas did however represent Wales at under-23 level.
