= Baltimore Bays =

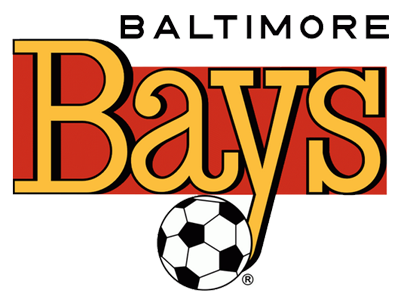
- Full name: Baltimore Bays
- Founded: 1967
- Dissolved: 1969
- Stadium: Memorial Stadium (50,000); Kirk Field (10,000)
- Chairman: Jerold Hoffberger
- Coach: Doug Millward (1967); Gordon Jago (1968–1969)
- League: National Professional Soccer League (1967); North American Soccer League (1968–1969)
| colors | Away colors |

The Baltimore Bays were a professional soccer team based in Baltimore, Maryland founded in 1967 as one of the ten charter members of the National Professional Soccer League (NPSL). When the NPSL and the rival United Soccer Association (USA) merged in 1968 to form the North American Soccer League (NASL), the team moved to the new league. The Bays played its home matches at Memorial Stadium during its first two seasons and moved to Kirk Field, a high school football stadium, in 1969. The team folded at the conclusion of the 1969 NASL season.

== History ==
=== Origins ===
In 1966 several groups of entrepreneurs were exploring the idea of forming a professional soccer league in United States and Canada. Two of these groups merged to form the National Professional Soccer League (NPSL) and franchise rights were awarded to ten ownership groups. Two of these ownership groups, one led by Earl Foreman and another by Murdaugh Stuart Madden, sought to locate a team in Washington, D.C., and placed bids for a lease at the District of Columbia Stadium. After the lease was awarded to Foreman's group, whose team would become the Washington Whips, Madden looked for another location for his team, eventually selling his franchise rights for $60,000 to the Baltimore Orioles in a deal announced on November 28, 1966. A month later, the team hired Clive Toye to act as the team's Vice President and General Manager. On January 10, 1967, the team name of Bays was revealed. Baltimore Orioles owner Jerold Hoffberger, who was also the owner of National Brewing Company chose the team's kit colors red and gold to match the brewing company's color scheme. Former Ipswich Town forward Doug Millward was brought in to be the club's head coach.

=== National Professional Soccer League, 1967 ===
The Bays opened their first season at home on April 24, 1967, in a nationally televised game against the Atlanta Chiefs, winning the game 1–0 and receiving a standing ovation from the 8,434 fan in attendance. The game was the first professional soccer match to be televised in the United States. The team finished the season first in the Eastern Division with a record of fourteen wins, nine loses and nine draws, scoring 53 goals with an average attendance of 5,838. The Bays faced the Oakland Clippers for the 1967 postseason championship final in two-game aggregate match. Baltimore won the first leg 1–0 but lost the second game 4–1, giving the Clippers a 4–2 aggregate victory for the championship. Between the two matches, it was reported by that a decision to fire Millward was made sometime in August when the coach had inquired about his future with the club. Gordon Jago was named his replacement on October 24, 1967. For the season, the Bays recorded a loss of $400,000.

=== North American Soccer League, 1968–1969 ===
With the merger of the NPSL with the United Soccer Association it was announced that Baltimore would be one of the 20 teams in play in the North American Soccer League (NASL). (Note: 17 teams contested the 1968 NASL season with three teams folding before the season began) Playing its home games again at Memorial Stadium for the 1968 season, the team had an average attendance of 4,628 winning thirteen games, drawing three and losing sixteen ending the season in fourth place in the Atlantic Division and reported loses of $500,000. In June 1968, player Shimon Cohen sued both the Bays and the San Diego Toros accusing the teams of slander, breach of contract and other charges when his contract was sold by the Bays to San Diego.

Baltimore was one of only five teams remaining in the NASL for the 1969 season. Having played home matches at Memorial Stadium for the previous two seasons, the team moved to Kirk field, a high school football field, for the 1969 season. The 1969 season was split into two parts. The first, called the International Cup was a double round-robin tournament with teams imported from England and Scotland representing the remaining five cites. Baltimore was represented by the West Ham United F.C. which finished the tournament in second place. The second half of the season the teams competed with their normal rosters. The Bays finished this second half of the season with only two wins and averaging 1,601 fans a game. On September 24, 1969, citing loses of over $1,000,000, executive vice president Joe Hamper announced the team was ceasing operations.

== Year-by-year ==
| Year | League | W | L | T | Pts | Regular season | Playoffs | Avg. attendance |
|---|---|---|---|---|---|---|---|---|
| 1967 | NPSL | 14 | 9 | 9 | 162 | 1st, Eastern Division | Runners-up (Oakland) | 5,838 |
| 1968 | NASL | 13 | 16 | 3 | 128 | 4th, Atlantic Division | Did not qualify | 4,628 |
| 1969 | NASL | 2 | 13 | 1 | 42 | 5th | Did not qualify | 1,238 |

== Honors ==
NPSL championships
- 1967 -runners up

Division titles

- 1967 Eastern Division

US Soccer Hall of Fame

- 1996 Gordon Bradley
- 2003 Clive Toye

Indoor Soccer Hall of Fame

- 2013 Gordon Jago

Rookie of the Year

- 1969 Siegfried Stritzl

All-Star first team selections

- 1967 Juan Santisteban, Badu DaCruz & Art Welch
- 1969 John Borodiak & Art Welch

All-Star second team selections

- 1968 Dennis Viollet

== Coaches ==
- Doug Millward (1967)
- Gordon Jago (1968–69)
