= Malcolm Slater =

Scottish footballer

Personal information
- Full name: Malcolm Bruce Slater
- Date of birth: 22 October 1938 (age 88)
- Place of birth: Buckie, Scotland
- Date of death: 20 January 2021
- Place of death: Southend
- Position: Right winger

Youth career
- Buckie Thistle

Senior career*
| Years | Team | Apps | (Gls) |
| 1958–1960 | Celtic | 5 | (1) |
| 1960–1961 | Buckie Thistle | ? | (?) |
| 1961–1962 | Inverness Caledonian | ? | (?) |
| 1962–1963 | Montrose | 25 | (3) |
| 1963–1966 | Southend United | 82 | (6) |
| 1966–1970 | Leyton Orient | 111 | (4) |
| 1969 | → Colchester United (loan) | 4 | (0) |
| 1970–? | Folkestone Town | ? | (?) |
- * Club domestic league appearances and goals as of 00:17, 17 May 2011

Malcolm Bruce Slater (born 22 October 1938) was a Scottish former professional footballer, who played as a winger. A product of the Highland League club Buckie Thistle, Slater played in the Scottish Football League for Celtic and Montrose, the English Football League for Southend United, Leyton Orient and Colchester United. He also played non-league football in both Scotland and England for Inverness Caledonian of the Highland League, and Folkestone Town of the English Southern League at that time.
