= Ollie Hopkins =

English association football player

Personal information
- Full name: Oliver Thomas Hopkins
- Date of birth: 15 November 1935
- Place of birth: South Kirkby, England
- Date of death: 14 April 2014 (aged 78)
- Place of death: Chelmsford, England
- Positions: Centre half; striker

Senior career*
Years	Team	Apps	(Gls)
- Burtonwood
1954–1961	Barnsley	50	(10)
1961–1965	Peterborough United	104	(0)
1965–1967	Chelmsford City	50	(2)
1967–1970	Brentwood Town		
1970–1971	Chelmsford City	0	(0)

Managerial career
- 1978: Chelmsford City
- * Club domestic league appearances and goals

Oliver Thomas Hopkins (15 November 1935 – 14 April 2014) was an English footballer who played as a centre half.

== Career ==
In May 1954, Hopkins joined Barnsley from Burtonwood. Although a centre half by trade, Hopkins also played as a striker for the club, scoring a hat-trick in a 3–2 away win against Newport County on 13 March 1954. After making 54 appearances in all competitions for Barnsley, Hopkins signed for Peterborough United in 1961. Hopkins made 104 Football League appearances at Peterborough over the course of four years, before signing for Chelmsford City following recommendations by former Barnsley teammates Peter Gillott and Ron Smillie.

Hopkins made 91 appearances in his first spell at Chelmsford, before signing for Brentwood Town in 1967. In 1970, Hopkins returned to Chelmsford, following a merger between both clubs, in a coaching capacity as well as making three final appearances. In 1974, Hopkins briefly left the club, following Dave Bumpstead's departure as manager. In 1978, Hopkins was appointed manager of Chelmsford, following a two-year period managing the club's reserves. In 2010, Hopkins was named president of Chelmsford, after witnessing his son and grandson turn out for the club.
