= David Pugh (footballer, born 1947) =

Welsh footballer

Personal information
- Full name: David Pugh
- Date of birth: 22 January 1947 (age 79)
- Place of birth: Markham, Caerphilly, Wales
- Height: 5 ft 8 in (1.73 m)
- Positions: Defender; winger

Senior career*
Years	Team	Apps	(Gls)
1962–1967	Newport County	78	(9)
1967–1973	Chesterfield	213	(12)
1973–1976	Halifax Town	96	(3)
1976–1978	Rotherham United	58	(0)
1978–1981	York City	77	(2)
1983–	Goole Town		
- Burton Albion
- Scarborough
Total		522	(26)

International career
- Wales Schools
	Wales U23	2	(0)

Managerial career
- 1983–????: Goole Town
- * Club domestic league appearances and goals

David Pugh (born 22 January 1947) is a Welsh former professional footballer who played as a winger in the Football League for Newport County, Chesterfield, Halifax Town, Rotherham United and York City and in non-League football for Goole Town (as player-manager), Burton Albion and Scarborough. He was a Wales schoolboy and under-23 international. He worked as player coach at York City and reserve team and youth team coach at Doncaster Rovers.
