= NPSL Final 1967 =

Soccer match

- Event: Soccer Bowl (NPSL)
Baltimore Bays	Oakland Clippers
2	4
- on aggregate

First leg
Baltimore Bays	Oakland Clippers
1	0
- Date: September 3, 1967
- Venue: Memorial Stadium, Baltimore, Maryland
- Referee: Walter Crossley (England)
- Attendance: 16,619

Second leg
Oakland Clippers	Baltimore Bays
4	1
- Date: September 9, 1967
- Venue: Oakland-Alameda Coliseum, Oakland, California
- Referee: Mike Ashkenazi
- Attendance: 9,037

The 1967 NPSL Final was the National Professional Soccer League's postseason championship final of the 1967 season. The event was contested in a two-game aggregate match between the Oakland Clippers and the Baltimore Bays. The first leg was played on September 3, 1967 at Memorial Stadium in Baltimore, Maryland, with the Bays winning 1–0. The return leg was contested on September 9, 1967 at the Oakland-Alameda Coliseum in Oakland, California, and the Clippers won it by the score of 4–1. With the two-day competition complete, the Oakland Clippers held a 4–2 aggregate lead and were crowned the 1967 NPSL champions.

== Background ==
The Baltimore Bays finished first in the Eastern Division regular season with 14 wins, 9 draws, and 9 losses for a total of 162 points. The Philadelphia Spartans had the exact same record, but finished in second position with only 157 points. This was due to the league's unique scoring system that allowed up to three bonus points per match for each goal scored. The Oakland Clippers finished first in the Western Division, as well as first overall in the league, with 19 wins, 5 draws, and 8 defeats for 185 points. The Clippers easily outpaced the division runner-up St. Louis Stars by 29 points. As division champions each squad earned the right to compete in the championship series.

== Match summary ==
Western Division Champions	Eastern Division Champions	1st. leg	Venue	2nd. leg	Venue	Agg.
Oakland Clippers	Baltimore Bays	0–1	Memorial Stadium	4–1	Oakland-Alameda Coliseum	4–2

== Match details ==
=== First leg ===
September 3
2:15 p.m. EDT

Baltimore Bays	1–0	Oakland Clippers
Viollet 72'	Report 1 Report 2

Memorial Stadium, Baltimore
Attendance: 16,619
Referee: Walter Crossley (England)

Baltimore Bays	Oakland Clippers

=== Second leg ===
September 9
12:45 p.m. PDT

Oakland Clippers	4–1	Baltimore Bays
Djukic 27', 35', 38' (pen.); Marín 58'	Report 1 Report 2 Report 3	Santisteban (red card) 38'; Saint-Vil 41'

Oakland-Alameda Coliseum, Oakland
Attendance: 9,037
Referee: Mike Ashkenazi

Oakland Clippers	Baltimore Bays

1967 NPSL Champions: Oakland Clippers
