= Alan Dennis =

English footballer

Personal information
- Full name: Alan George Dennis
- Date of birth: 22 February 1951 (age 75)
- Place of birth: Colchester, England
- Position: Defender

Youth career
- Colchester United

Senior career*
| Years | Team | Apps | (Gls) |
| 1970–1971 | Colchester United | 5 | (0) |
- Dover
| Total | | 5 | (0) |
- * Club domestic league appearances and goals

Alan George Dennis (born 22 February 1951) is an English former footballer who played in the Football League as a defender for Colchester United.

== Career ==
Born in Colchester, Dennis began his career as a youth player at hometown club Colchester United. He made his debut as a substitute for Micky Brown in the 13th minute of a 2–0 victory against Lincoln City on 22 April 1970. He made five appearances for the U's, playing his final game for the club just under one year after his debut in a 4–0 defeat at Oldham Athletic before leaving to join Dover.
