= Barry Rowan =

English footballer

Personal information
- Full name: Barry Rowan
- Date of birth: 24 April 1942 (age 84)
- Place of birth: Willesden, England
- Position: Winger

Youth career
- Watford

Senior career*
Years	Team	Apps	(Gls)
1960–1961	Brentford	0	(0)
1961–1964	Dover		
1964–1967	Millwall	72	(13)
1967	Oakland Clippers	12	(1)
1968	Detroit Cougars	17	(2)
1968	Middlesbrough	0	(0)
1968	Colchester United	2	(0)
1969	Durban United		
1969	Reading	1	(0)
1969–1970	Plymouth Argyle	10	(1)
1970–1973	Exeter City	81	(14)
1971	→ Dallas Tornado (loan)	15	(0)
1972	→ Toronto Metros (loan)	12	(1)
- Poole Town
- * Club domestic league appearances and goals

Barry Rowan (born 24 April 1942) is an English former professional footballer who played as a winger, most notably in the Football League for Exeter City and Millwall. He also played in the United States and South Africa.

== Career statistics ==
Appearances and goals by club, season and competition
Club	Season	League			National Cup		League Cup		Total	
Club	Season	Division	Apps	Goals	Apps	Goals	Apps	Goals	Apps	Goals
Millwall	1964–65	Fourth Division	35	8	4	3	3	2	42	13
Millwall	1965–66	Third Division	34	5	2	1	3	0	39	6
Millwall	1966–67	Second Division	3	0	0	0	0	0	3	0
Millwall	Total		72	13	6	4	6	2	84	19
Oakland Clippers	1967	National Professional Soccer League	12	1	—		—		12	1
Detroit Cougars	1968	North American Soccer League	17	2	—		—		17	2
Colchester United	1968–69	Fourth Division	2	0	1	0	—		3	0
Plymouth Argyle	1969–70	Third Division	10	1	0	0	0	0	10	1
Dallas Tornado (loan)	1971	North American Soccer League	15	0	—		—		15	0
Toronto Metros (loan)	1972	North American Soccer League	13	1	—		—		13	1
Career total			141	18	7	4	6	2	154	24

== Honours ==
Millwall

- Football League Third Division second-place promotion: 1965–66
- Football League Fourth Division second-place promotion: 1964–65

Oakland Clippers

- National Professional Soccer League: 1967

Dallas Tornado

- North American Soccer League: 1971
