= Milan Čop =

Croatian footballer

Personal information
- Date of birth: 5 October 1938 (age 88)
- Place of birth: Slavonski Brod, Kingdom of Yugoslavia
- Position: Defender

Senior career*
Years	Team	Apps	(Gls)
1961–1962	BSK Slavonski Brod		
1962–1967	Red Star Belgrade	95	(2)
1967–1968	Oakland Clippers	42	(7)
1969–1971	Nancy	27	(1)
1974	San Jose Earthquakes	5	(0)

International career
1963–1964	Yugoslavia	10	(0)
- * Club domestic league appearances and goals

Milan "Mile" Čop (born 5 October 1938, in Kingdom of Yugoslavia) is a Croatian retired football player.

== International career ==
He made his debut for Yugoslavia in an October 1963 friendly match away against Romania and earned a total of 10 caps scoring no goals. His final international was an October 1964 Olympic Games match against Japan.
