= Roy Massey (footballer) =

English footballer and coach

Personal information
- Date of birth: 10 September 1943 (age 83)
- Place of birth: Mexborough, Yorkshire,
- Position: Centre forward

Senior career*
Years	Team	Apps	(Gls)
1964–1967	Rotherham United	16	(6)
1967–1969	Leyton Orient	63	(13)
1969–1971	Colchester United	34	(11)
- * Club domestic league appearances and goals

Roy Massey (born 10 September 1943) was an English football player and coach.

== Career ==
As a player, Massey played as a centre forward for Rotherham United (1964–67), Leyton Orient (1967–69) and Colchester United (1969–71). At Orient, Massey was temporarily coached by Bob Stokoe, and partnered at times Vic Halom up front. In his first season he was top scorer with 12 league goals, including a priceless 1-0 winner in a late season relegation battle against Bournemouth, from 41 starts and his headed winner in the FA Cup against Bury gave him 13 in all competitions. However, in a similar fashion to what had happened at Millmoor, Massey suffered an injury in his second season and was later transferred for £5,000 to Layer Road.

Following another serious injury he retired from playing football at aged 27 in 1971 but, persuaded by Colchester manager Dick Graham, his former boss at Brisbane Road, he became a youth team coach at Colchester United before moving to Norwich City's centre of excellence. In 1998, he was recruited by Liam Brady at the Arsenal Academy to help develop facilities there and recruit and train children from as young as eight years old up to aged 16.

This was a return to Highbury as in the early 60s Massey had done well enough to earn a professional contract after impressive appearances in the youth and reserve teams. However, having already started a course to achieve his PE certificate he was forced to turn down the offer at a time when wages in football were a lot less than today. In the event the decision proved a wise one as Massey was in 1971 forced to become a PE teacher following his football career coming to an end. Over 16 years at Arsenal between 1998 and 2014 those that he helped bring through to top class football at Arsenal included Alex Iwobi, Bukayo Saka and Jack Wilshere.

He also had his misses, turning down Harry Kane as a youngster.

His grandfather was James Massey, a goalkeeper for Doncaster Rovers and Sheffield Wednesday in the late nineteenth- and early twentieth-century. Jimmy was an FA Cup winner when Wednesday beat Wolverhampton Wanderers, his home town team, 2-1 at the 1896 FA Cup final at the Crystal Palace. He was later badly injured when he returned to working as a coal miner.
