= Bert Howe =

English footballer

Personal information
- Full name: Albert Richard Henry Howe
- Date of birth: 16 November 1938 (age 87)
- Place of birth: Charlton, Greater London
- Position: Defender

Senior career*
Years	Team	Apps	(Gls)
1957–58	Cray Wanderers	2	(0)
1958	Faversham Town	?	(?)
1958–1967	Crystal Palace	193	(0)
1967–1969	Leyton Orient	91	(0)
1969–1970	Colchester United	29	(1)
1970–?	Romford	?	(?)
- * Club domestic league appearances and goals

Albert Richard Henry Howe (born 16 November 1938) is an English, retired professional footballer who played as a defender in The Football League.

== Career ==
Born in Charlton, London, Howe made 313 league appearances for Crystal Palace, Leyton Orient and Colchester United, before moving into non-league football with Romford.
