= Ken O'Rourke =

English footballer

Personal information
- Full name: Kenneth O'Rourke
- Date of birth: 8 December 1949 (age 76)
- Place of birth: Lambeth, London, England
- Height: 5 ft 10 in (1.78 m)
- Position: Forward

Youth career
- Leyton Orient

Senior career*
| Years | Team | Apps | (Gls) |
| 1967–1968 | Arsenal | 0 | (0) |
| 1968 | Colchester United | 1 | (0) |
- Bedford Town
- Metropolitan Police
| Total | | 1 | (0) |
- * Club domestic league appearances and goals

Kenneth O'Rourke (born 8 December 1949) is an English former footballer who played in the Football League as a forward for Colchester United.

== Career ==
Born in Lambeth, London, O'Rourke showed great promise as an apprentice at Leyton Orient, leading to Arsenal signing him at the age of 17 in February 1967. Failing to make a first-team appearance for the Gunners, he was released by the club at the end of the 1967–68 season after scoring 12 goals in 42 youth games, joining Ipswich Town on a two-month trial. He again failed to make the grade at Ipswich, joining neighbours Colchester United on a similar trial period in October 1968.

Whilst with Colchester, O'Rourke made his first and only Football League appearance in a 2–0 Fourth Division defeat to Swansea City at Vetch Field on 23 November 1968. He also made one other appearance for the U's in the FA Cup, a 5–0 thrashing of Chesham United in the first round one week prior to his league debut.

O'Rourke was released at the end of his trial period, joining Bedford Town and later the Metropolitan Police for several years after becoming a police officer, playing in the Southern League.
