= Bobby Howlett =

English footballer

Personal information
- Full name: Robert Victor Howlett
- Date of birth: 12 December 1948 (age 77)
- Place of birth: West Ham, Essex, England
- Position: Defender

Youth career
- Chelsea

Senior career*
Years	Team	Apps	(Gls)
1967–1969	Southend United	6	(0)
1969–1970	Colchester United	16	(0)
Total		22	(0)
- * Club domestic league appearances and goals

Robert Victor Howlett (born 12 December 1948) is an English former footballer who played in the Football League as a defender for Southend United and Colchester United. He began his career at Chelsea where he failed to make a first-team appearance.

== Career ==
Born in West Ham, Essex, Howlett signed for Chelsea as a youth, prior to signing for Southend United. He failed to make an appearance at Chelsea, and played in just six league games for Southend between 1967 and 1969, starting four league games and coming on as a substitute for the other two, also making one FA Cup start.

Howlett signed for Essex rivals Colchester United in July 1969, and made his debut on 9 August 1969 at Sincil Bank during a 3–3 draw with Lincoln City. He made a further 15 league appearances for the U's. On 18 April 1970, Howlett was to play his last professional game, after coming on as a 72nd-minute substitute for Ray Whittaker, he suffered a career-ending broken leg in a challenge with Peter Gelson in the 88th minute of a 2–0 away defeat to Brentford. He was forced to retire on medical grounds after this injury.
