= Owen Simpson =

English footballer

Personal information
- Date of birth: 18 September 1943 (age 83)
- Place of birth: Mickley, England
- Position: Fullback

Senior career*
Years	Team	Apps	(Gls)
1964–1967	Rotherham United	6	(0)
1967–1968	Leyton Orient	36	(4)
1968–1969	Colchester United	43	(4)
1969–1970	Southend United	64	(1)
1970–1971	Darlington	11	(0)
1971–1972	Grimsby Town	7	(0)
1972–1975	Boston United		
- * Club domestic league appearances and goals

Owen Simpson (born 18 September 1943) is an English former professional footballer. He played for Rotherham, Leyton Orient, Colchester, Southend, Darlington and Grimsby in The Football League
