= Jim Oliver (footballer) =

Scottish footballer

Personal information
- Full name: James Robert Oliver
- Date of birth: 3 December 1941 (age 84)
- Place of birth: Falkirk, Scotland
- Position: Forward

Senior career*
Years	Team	Apps	(Gls)
?–1958	Linlithgow Rose	?	(?)
1958–1962	Falkirk	78	(13)
1962–1964	Norwich City	40	(14)
1964–1967	Brighton & Hove Albion	43	(6)
1967–1970	Colchester United	75	(10)
1970–?	King's Lynn	?	(?)
- * Club domestic league appearances and goals as of 14:15, 16 May 2011

James Robert Oliver (born 3 December 1941) is a Scottish former professional footballer who played as a forward.

== Career ==
Born in Falkirk, Scotland, Oliver played for Linlithgow Rose and Falkirk in the Scottish leagues before moving to English football with Norwich City, Brighton & Hove Albion and Colchester United.

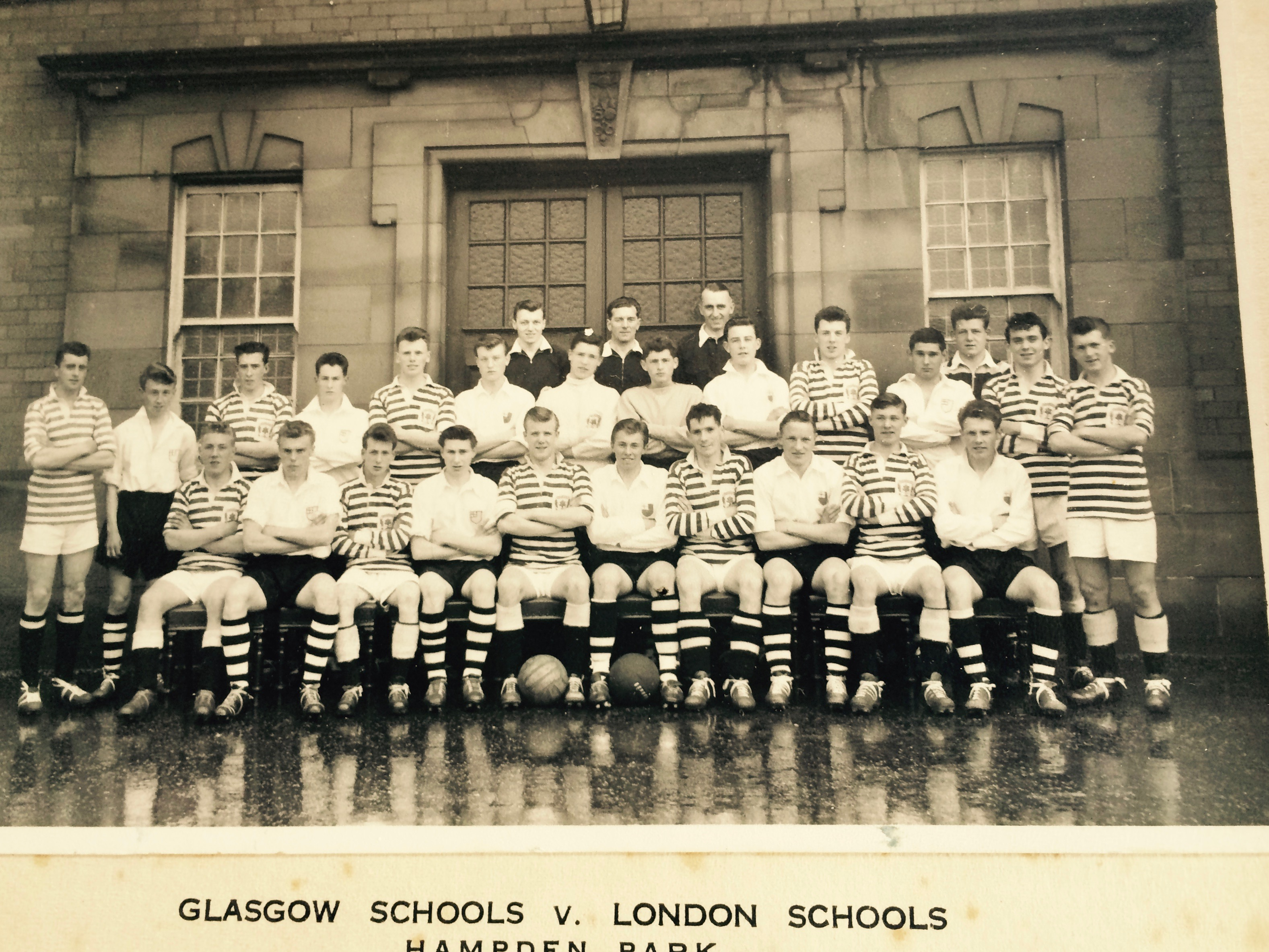

== Honours ==
Brighton & Hove Albion

- Football League Fourth Division: 1964–65
