= Roger Joslyn =

English footballer

Personal information
- Full name: Roger Douglas William Joslyn
- Date of birth: 7 May 1950 (age 76)
- Place of birth: Colchester, England
- Height: 5 ft 10 in (1.78 m)
- Position: Midfielder

Youth career
- –1967: Colchester United

Senior career*
Years	Team	Apps	(Gls)
1967–1970	Colchester United	99	(4)
1970–1974	Aldershot	186	(17)
1974–1979	Watford	182	(17)
1979–1982	Reading	68	(1)
Total		535	(39)
- * Club domestic league appearances and goals

Roger Douglas William Joslyn (born 7 May 1950) is an English former footballer, who played as a midfielder. He amassed over 500 appearances in the Football League for Colchester United, Aldershot, Watford and Reading.

== Career ==
Born in Colchester, Joslyn signed for hometown club Colchester United as an amateur at the age of seventeen, before turning professional at the end of the 1967–68 season. He joined Aldershot for a fee of £8,000 in October 1970. Four years later, Watford manager Mike Keen offered Aldershot £10,000 plus Pat Morrissey for Joslyn's services. Joslyn stayed at Vicarage Road for five years, 214 appearances and scoring 21 goals. He played a part in Watford's consecutive promotions under Graham Taylor, before being sold to Reading in November 1979 for £40,000. Joslyn retired from football in January 1981 due to an arthritic hip. After retiring from football, Joslyn moved into business, and now runs a furniture manufacturing company.

== Honours ==
=== Club ===
Watford

- Football League Third Division Runner-up (1): 1978–79
- Football League Fourth Division Winner (1): 1977–78

=== Individual ===
- PFA Team of the Year (1): 1977–78
