= Oakland Clippers =

Defunct soccer club from Oakland, California, U.S.

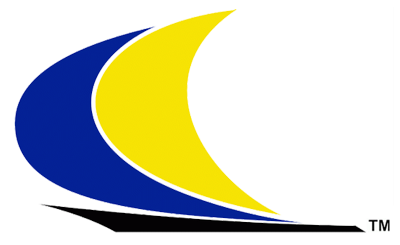
- Full name: Oakland Clippers
- Founded: 1966
- Dissolved: June 4, 1969; 56 years ago
- Stadium: Oakland–Alameda County Coliseum, Oakland, California
- Capacity: 47,416
- Chairman: Joseph O'Neill & H.T. Hilliard
- League: NPSL (1967); NASL (1968)
Home colors	Away colors

The Oakland Clippers (active 1967–1968, also named the California Clippers) were an American soccer team based in Oakland, California. They played in the non-FIFA sanctioned National Professional Soccer League (NPSL) in 1967 and the North American Soccer League (NASL) in the following season. Their home field was Oakland–Alameda County Coliseum.

== Overview ==
The Clippers brought the first-ever national professional championship in any sport to the San Francisco Bay Area and the City of Oakland. Team owners originally planned to play in San Francisco until General Manager Derek Liecty convinced them that the new Oakland-Alameda County Coliseum was a better choice than San Francisco's old and windy Kezar stadium. Through connections in Yugoslavia, the Clippers were able to hire Dr. Aleksandar Obradovic, former Team Manager of Red Star of Belgrade. Obradovic brought with him Red Star coach and former Yugoslav international Ivan Toplak as well as a nucleus of six first-division players who were willing to play in the non-sanctioned league. During the 1967/1968 season the Clippers had players from ten countries. In 1967 they won the NPSL Western Division and overall regular season titles. They went on to win the NPSL Final over the Baltimore Bays by a two-game, home-and-home aggregate score of 4-2. They also won the Commissioner's Cup over the St. Louis Stars by a score of 6-3. Following the 1967 season, the team joined the newly formed North American Soccer League (NASL), the result of the merger between the NPSL and the United Soccer Association (USA).

In 1968, the Clippers had an identical record to the Western Division Champion San Diego Toros and a higher goal-differential, but the Toros had more league points. As the result of a disputed referee’s off-side call in their final regular season game against the San Diego Toros, a 3-3 tie, the Clippers finished in second place and were eliminated from the playoffs. The unique points system denied them the chance to defend their 1967 NPSL title in 1968’s merged league. The North American Soccer League was near collapse in September 1968. Having no possible League opponents west of Dallas, Texas and wanting to maintain the team while waiting for the NASL to become reconstituted, the Clippers began playing an independent schedule as the California Clippers against top foreign club teams. These efforts included bringing to the United States for the first time a team from the Soviet Union, league club champion Dynamo Kiev. The three-game match up was split with a win and a tie for each. Alarmed by the success of the Clippers and concerned that such an independent schedule might thwart plans for a reconstituted NASL, the United States Soccer-Football Association placed restrictions on the Clippers and prevented them from arranging any further international games. Just before the ban, the Clippers defeated Italian league champion Fiorentina in their final game by a score of 4-2 and posted an exhibition match record of 7-6-2. The Clippers ceased operations on June 4, 1969. The team's owners had lost $1.5 million while running the team and cited the dysfunctional relationship between various governing bodies as a reason for folding the team.

Several Clippers players, as well as coach Ivan Toplak, went on to join the original San Jose Earthquakes team founded as a member of the North American Soccer League in 1974: Goalkeeper Mirko Stojanovic, leading scorer Ilija Mitić, Momčilo "Gabbo" Gavrić, and Milan Čop.

== Media coverage ==
The Clippers had matches on CBS national TV, including both legs of the championship final. KPIX provided coverage, though the Clippers' home leg of the championship was blacked out locally. Locally, KTVU provided tape delayed matches.

== Year-by-year ==
Year	League	W	L	T	Pts	Reg. season	Playoffs	Cup
1967	NPSL	19	8	5	185	1st, Western Division	Won Championship	Won Commissioners Cup
1968	NASL	18	8	6	185	2nd, Pacific Division	did not qualify	did not enter

== Honors ==
National Professional Soccer League

- Champions: 1967
- Premiers: 1967
- Commissioner's Cup: 1967
- Western Division: 1967

1967 First Team All-Stars

- Mirko Stojanovic
- Mel Scott
- Ilija Mitic
- Mario Baesso
North American Soccer League

1968 First Team All-Stars

- Mirko Stojanović
- Mel Scott
- Momcilio Gavric
- David Davidovic
- Ilija Mitic

1968 Second Team All-Stars

- Milan Čop
- Mario Baesso

== Team roster ==
=== 1967 Roster ===
Player	Position	Birth Date	Height	Weight	Hometown
Baesso, Mario	D	September 5, 1945	5'7	--	São Paulo, Brazil
Bena, Stevan	D	August 23, 1935	5'11"	170	Serbia
Conde, Leonel	G	1937	6'2"	174	Uruguay
Constancia, Jose	F	March 19, 1945	--	--	Willemstad, Curaçao
Čop, Milan	M, D	October 5, 1941	5'10"	168	Slavonski Brod, Croatia
Crawford, Roel	M	October 7, 1947	--	--	Limón, Costa Rica
Davidović, Dimitri	D, M	May 21, 1944	5'10"	160	Aleksandrovac, Serbia
Djukic, Dragan	M	March 29, 1939	6'1"	160	Belgrade, Serbia
Gavrić, Momčilo	D	August 4, 1938	5'10"	170	Sinj, Croatia
Hoftvedt, Trond	M	May 30, 1941	5'10"	166	Oslo, Norway
Lievano, George	F	--	--	--	San Salvador, El Salvador
Lukić, Ilija	F	December 12, 1942	5'9"	150	Serbia
Lunnis, Roy	D	November 4, 1939	--	--	London, England
Marin, Edgar	F, M	March 22, 1943	5'5"	135	San Jose, Costa Rica
Milosevic, Sele	F	April 4, 1940	6'0"	167	Šabac, Serbia
Mitić, Ilija	M, F	July 19, 1940	5'10"	160	Belgrade, Serbia
Quirós, William	F, M	October 10, 1941	5'5"	143	Alajuela, Costa Rica
Rowan, Barry	F	April 24, 1942	5'9"	163	Willesden, England
Saccone, Ademar	F, M	October 11, 1934	5'10"	160	Montevideo, Uruguay
Scott, Melvyn	M	September 26, 1939	--	--	Claygate, England
Stojanović, Mirko	G	July 11, 1939	6'0"	190	Zagreb, Croatia
Wiestal, Kay-Arne	F	--	5'10"	165	Sweden
Zuniga, Jose	F	--	--	--	Costa Rica
