= Brian Wood (footballer) =

English footballer

Personal information
- Full name: Brian Thomas Wood
- Date of birth: 8 December 1940
- Place of birth: Hamworthy, England
- Date of death: 5 July 2014 (aged 73)
- Place of death: Saxtead, England
- Position: Central defender

Youth career
- West Bromwich Albion

Senior career*
Years	Team	Apps	(Gls)
1958–1961	West Bromwich Albion	0	(0)
1961–1966	Crystal Palace	143	(1)
1966–1968	Leyton Orient	58	(3)
1968–1970	Colchester United	71	(2)
1970–1976	Workington	204	(9)
Total		476	(15)
- * Club domestic league appearances and goals as of 11:57, 17 May 2011

Brian Thomas Wood (8 December 1940 – 5 July 2014) was an English footballer who played as a central defender.

== Career ==
Born in Hamworthy, Wood made a total of 476 appearances in The Football League for West Bromwich Albion, Crystal Palace, Leyton Orient, Colchester United and Workington. After leaving Workington, he became a scout for Preston North End, a job he combined with managing the Willis Faber and Dumas sports club in Ipswich.

After suffering dementia and Parkinson's disease, Wood died in a care home in Saxtead, Suffolk on 5 July 2014.

== Honours ==
=== Club ===
Crystal Palace

- Football League Third Division Runner-up (1): 1963–64
