= Dave Bickles =

English footballer (1944–1999)

Personal information
- Full name: David Bickles
- Date of birth: 6 April 1944
- Place of birth: West Ham, England
- Date of death: 1 November 1999 (aged 55)
- Place of death: Havering, England
- Position: Centre half

Youth career
- 1960–1962: West Ham United

Senior career*
Years	Team	Apps	(Gls)
1963–1967	West Ham United	25	(0)
1967–1968	Crystal Palace	0	(0)
1968–1970	Colchester United	68	(3)
1970–1977	Romford	168	(4)

Managerial career
- Romford (player manager)
- Collier Row
- * Club domestic league appearances and goals as of 2 November 2009

David Bickles (6 April 1944 – 1 November 1999) was an English professional footballer who played as a centre half.

== Career ==
Bickles started his career as a youth player for West Ham United. He made his debut for West Ham at Anfield in a 2–1 win in September 1963; the last occasion that West Ham would beat Liverpool on their own ground for 52 years and 42 games.

During a game against Liverpool in 1966, Bickles was injured in a clash with Ian St John and dislocated his shoulder. Never fully diagnosed by West Ham doctors Bickles was accused of not putting in the effort. After only 28 appearances in all competitions for West Ham he was transferred to Crystal Palace in October 1967. Palace medical staff fully diagnosed Bickle's injury problems and discovered that a piece of bone had broken-off from his shoulder. Injury meant that he failed to play for Palace and in 1968 moved to Colchester United before becoming player/manager for Romford in the Southern League.

Bickles had a short spell managing Collier Row in the Spartan League in the 1980s. Leaving football Bickles took up teaching in East Ham where, as a PE teacher, he spotted Lee Hodges playing and recommended him to "The Hammers". In the 1990s he was invited by West Ham youth coach Tony Carr, with whom he had played in the 1960s, to join the coaching staff. Ill health struck Bickles in 1997 when he was diagnosed with kidney cancer; the cause of his death on 1 November 1999.

A few days later, on 4 November 1999, before a UEFA Cup game against Steaua Bucharest a minute's silence was held for Bickles and fellow West Ham player Johnny Byrne who had also recently died.
