= Dimitri Davidović =

Belgian football manager and former player

Personal information
- Full name: Dimitrije Davidović
- Date of birth: 21 May 1944 (age 82)
- Place of birth: Belgrade, Yugoslavia
- Position: Midfielder

Youth career
- Partizan

Senior career*
Years	Team	Apps	(Gls)
1963–1967	Partizan	21	(0)
1967–1968	Oakland Clippers	35	(8)
1969–1971	NEC	39	(5)
1971–1978	Lierse SK	197	(14)
1978	San Jose Earthquakes	27	(1)

Managerial career
- 1980–1983: FC Antwerp
- 1983–1985: Lokeren
- 1985–1986: Kortrijk
- 1986–1987: Beerschot
- 1988–1989: Lierse SK
- 1989–1991: FC Antwerp
- 1991–1992: Al Wasl
- 1994: Kispest Honvéd
- 1996–1997: Al-Ittihad Jeddah
- 1997–1998: Sharjah
- 1998–1999: Al-Ittihad Jeddah
- 1999–2000: Al Wahda
- 2000: Al-Ittihad Jeddah
- 2002–2003: Al-Ahli Jeddah
- 2005–2006: Qatar SC
- 2006–2007: Al-Ittihad Jeddah
- 2007–2008: Qatar SC
- 2008–2009: FC Antwerp
- 2011: Al-Ittihad Jeddah
- * Club domestic league appearances and goals

Dimitrije "Dimitri" Davidović (Serbian Cyrillic: Димитрије Димитри Давидовић; born 21 May 1944) is a Serbian–Belgian football manager and former player.

== Playing career ==
Davidović was a professional soccer player during 16 years in the first divisions of Europe.

=== Partizan ===
Born in Belgrade, Yugoslavia, Davidović started his career with FK Partizan going through all selections and played professionally there for five years. With the club, he won the Yugoslavian championship and played in the finals of the European Cup.

=== Oakland Clippers ===
In 1967, Davidovic signed with the Oakland Clippers of the National Professional Soccer League. They won both the Western Division and league championships that year. In 1968, the NPSL merged with the United Soccer Association to form the North American Soccer League. Davidovic remained with the Clippers in 1968, but the team withdrew from the league at the end of the season.

=== NEC Nijmegen ===
1969–1971, where he led the team as captain.

=== Lierse ===
1971–1978 During his seven-year stay, they were twice Cup finalists and took part in the Europe Cup.

=== San Jose Earthquakes ===
In 1978, Davidovic returned to the United States and signed with the San Jose Earthquakes of the NASL. He spent one season in San Jose, scoring one goal in twenty-seven games.

== Managerial career ==
In November 2006, Davidović took charge of Saudi side Al-Ittihad for the fourth time.

He then was appointed manager of FC Antwerp for the third time in summer 2008, only to resign in February 2009.

== Awards ==
- 1 Asian Cup Winners Cup, Continental Cup.
- 1 Gulf Cup.
- 3x Champion of Saudi Arabia, King Fahed Cup.
- 1 Cup of Saudi Arabia, Crown Prince Cup.
- 2 Federation Cup, Saudi Arabia.
- 1 Champion of U.A.E.
- 1 Cup of U.A.E.
- 1 Federation Cup, U.A.E.
- 1 Bronze medal in the Asian Cup Championship
- 1 H.R.H. Prince Abdullah Al Faisal Cup
- 1 Winning playoffs and promotion to the highest Belgian division
