= Danny Light =

English footballer (1948–2014)

- Light at Selhurst Park with the old Holmesdale Road Stand in the background

Personal information
- Full name: Daniel Light
- Date of birth: 10 July 1948
- Place of birth: Chiswick, England
- Date of death: 18 October 2014 (aged 66)
- Position: Forward

Senior career*
Years	Team	Apps	(Gls)
1965–1968	Crystal Palace	19	(5)
1968–1970	Colchester United	67	(14)
1970–1971	Guildford City		
1971–1975	Dartford		
1975–1976	Dover		
1976–1977	Wealdstone		
- Tonbridge Angels
Total		86+	(19+)
- * Club domestic league appearances and goals

Daniel Light (10 July 1948 – 18 October 2014) was a professional footballer who played as a forward.

== Career ==
Light began his career at Crystal Palace in 1965, making 22 appearances before being sold to Colchester United in 1968 for £4,000. He was a regular player for Colchester, and made 73 appearances before moving to Guildford City on a free transfer in 1970. He later played for Dartford, Dover, Wealdstone and Tonbridge Angels. Whilst at Dartford, he was part of the squad that finished as runners-up in the 1973–74 FA Trophy.

== Later life and death ==
He retired and moved to Turners Hill. He died on 18 October 2014, aged 66.
