= Ray Whittaker =

English footballer

Personal information
- Date of birth: 15 January 1945 (age 81)
- Place of birth: Bow, London, England
- Position: Winger

Youth career
- Arsenal

Senior career*
Years	Team	Apps	(Gls)
1962–1964	Arsenal	0	(0)
1963–1969	Luton Town	170	(40)
1969–1971	Colchester United	45	(7)
- * Club domestic league appearances and goals

Ray Whittaker (born 15 January 1945 in Bow, London) is an English former footballer.

== Career ==
Whittaker started his career as a youth team player at Arsenal before moving to Luton Town, where he made 170 appearances and scored 40 goals. He shared the honour of top scorer for Luton with Bruce Rioch in the 1966-67 season, scoring 11 goals. After six years at the club he moved to Colchester United in 1969. He retired from football at the young age of 26.

== Honours ==
=== Club ===
Luton Town

- Football League Fourth Division Winner (1): 1967–68
