= Micky Brown =

English footballer (1944–2021)

Personal information
- Full name: Michael John Brown
- Date of birth: 11 April 1944
- Place of birth: Farnham Common, England
- Date of death: 9 February 2021 (aged 76)
- Position: Forward

Senior career*
Years	Team	Apps	(Gls)
1961–1963	Fulham	4	(0)
1964–1967	Millwall	52	(11)
1967–1968	Luton Town	14	(2)
1968–1970	Colchester United	52	(12)
1971-1973	Wealdstone	79	(38)
1971–197?	Maidstone United		
- Tonbridge
- Hillingdon Borough
- * Club domestic league appearances and goals

Michael John Brown (11 April 1944 – 9 March 2021) was an English footballer who played as a forward in the Football League.

== Career ==
Brown began his career at Fulham, where he made four appearances. Following that, he appeared for Millwall 52 times scoring 11 league goals. Brown moved to Luton Town for the 1967–68 season, scoring two in 14 appearances, before moving on to Colchester United, where he scored 12 in 52 games. He then dropped into non-league football, appearing for Wealdstone, Maidstone United, Tonbridge and Hillingdon Borough.

== Death ==
On 9 February 2021, Millwall issued a statement on their website that Brown had died.

== Honours ==
=== Club ===
Millwall

- Football League Third Division Runner-up: 1965–66
