= Dennis Mochan =

Scottish footballer and manager

Personal information
- Full name: Dennis Mochan
- Date of birth: 12 December 1935 (age 90)
- Place of birth: Falkirk, Scotland
- Position: Fullback

Youth career
- ?–1957: Kilsyth Rangers

Senior career*
Years	Team	Apps	(Gls)
1957–1959	East Fife	53	(3)
1959–1962	Raith Rovers	85	(1)
1962–1966	Nottingham Forest	108	(1)
1966–1970	Colchester United	116	(2)

Managerial career
- 1972: Colchester United (Caretaker)
- * Club domestic league appearances and goals

Dennis Mochan (born 12 December 1935) is a Scottish former professional footballer. He played as a fullback for Kilsyth Rangers before playing for Scottish Football League clubs East Fife and Raith Rovers. He then moved to English football, playing for Nottingham Forest and Colchester United, before retiring. Mochan then became a member of the coaching staff at Colchester. Following Dick Graham's resignation as Colchester manager in 1972, Mochan acted as caretaker manager for 5 games, drawing two and losing three.

== Managerial statistics ==
Team	Nat	From	To	Record				
Team	Nat	From	To	P	W	D	L	Win %
Colchester United (Caretaker)	(England)	7 September 1972	24 October 1972	11	1	4	6	9.1
