= 1972–73 Colchester United F.C. season =

Colchester United
1972–73 season
- Chairman: Roy Chapman
- Manager: Dick Graham (until 8 September); Dennis Mochan (from 8 September to 1 October); Jim Smith (from 1 October)
- Stadium: Layer Road
- Fourth Division: 22nd (re-elected)
- FA Cup: 2nd round (eliminated by Bournemouth)
- League Cup: 1st round (eliminated by Gillingham)
- Top goalscorer: League: Mick Mahon (12); All: Mick Mahon (12)
- Highest home attendance: 7,419 v Bournemouth, 11 December 1972
- Lowest home attendance: 2,437 v Peterborough United, 9 April 1973
- Average home league attendance: 3,440
- Biggest win: 6–0 v Bognor Regis Town, 18 November 1972
- Biggest defeat: 0–4 v Chester, 30 August 1972 v Barnsley, 16 September 1972 v Northampton Town, 26 December 1972 v Bury, 23 April 1973
Home colours	Away colours

The 1972–73 season was Colchester United's 31st season in their history and their fifth successive season in the fourth tier of English football, the Fourth Division. Alongside competing in the Fourth Division, the club also participated in the FA Cup and the League Cup.

Manager Dick Graham resigned early in the new season, following two wins and four defeats in the opening six games of the campaign. Jim Smith was appointed his successor in early October, but his first win didn't arrive until mid-November. Colchester endured a very poor season, and were required to seek re-election after finishing 22nd in the league table.

Colchester suffered an early exit in the cup competitions as they were defeated in the first round of the League Cup by Gillingham, and the second round of the FA Cup by Bournemouth.

== Season overview ==
Colchester United held its annual general meeting in September 1972. Following questioning of his tactics by a shareholder, an incensed Dick Graham tendered his resignation as manager. The club had achieved two wins in the first six games of the season, but the other four matches ended in defeat. Dennis Mochan was appointed caretaker manager until a permanent replacement could be found. He took charge of five games, but was unable to improve Colchester's fortunes, with two draws and three defeats in his five games at the helm. An unknown Jim Smith, then-manager of Northern Premier League side Boston United who had just led the team to the title, was appointed Graham's replacement. With Colchester bottom of the Football League after 13 matches with six points, Smith's influence gave United an initial boost, earning the Manager of the Month award for lifting the club off the bottom of the table.

One of Smith's early pieces of business was signing his former Boston forward Bobby Svarc for £6,000 just before Christmas. However, his goalscoring influence did not immediately show, returning eight goals in 20 league outings. Fortunes did not improve for the U's as they finished the season in 22nd position and were required to seek re-election from the Football League. Colchester earned a maximum 48 votes from their fellow League clubs to retain Football League status for another season.

== Players ==
As of match played 30 April 1973.

Name	Position	Nationality	Place of birth	Date of birth	Apps	Goals	Signed from	Date signed	Fee
Goalkeepers
John McInally	GK	(Scotland)	Gatehouse of Fleet	26 September 1951 (aged 20)	0	0	(England) Lincoln City	25 November 1972 (Note: Date of signing refers to the date of the player's first game for the club)	Free transfer
Defenders
Richard Bourne	CB	(England)	Colchester	9 December 1954 (aged 17)	2	0	Apprentice	3 April 1972	Free transfer
Micky Cook	FB	(England)	Enfield	9 April 1951 (aged 21)	101	1	(England) Orient	1 March 1969	Free transfer
Ray Harford	CB	(England)	Halifax	1 June 1945 (aged 27)	0	0	(England) Port Vale	3 February 1973	£1,750
John McLaughlin	FB	(England)	Edmonton	29 October 1954 (aged 17)	9	0	Apprentice	18 March 1972	Free transfer
Stuart Morgan	CB	(Wales)	Swansea	23 September 1949 (aged 22)	0	0	(England) Reading	August 1972	Free transfer
Lindsay Smith	CB	(England)	Enfield	18 September 1954 (aged 17)	19	3	Apprentice	20 April 1971	Free transfer
Midfielders
Phil Bloss	MF	(England)	Colchester	16 January 1953 (aged 19)	23	2	Apprentice	January 1971	Free transfer
Stan Brown	MF	(England)	Lewes	15 September 1941 (aged 30)	0	0	(England) Fulham	December 1972	Free transfer
Steve Foley	MF	(England)	Clacton-on-Sea	21 June 1953 (aged 18)	17	4	Apprentice	July 1969	Free transfer
Steve Leslie	MF	(England)	Hornsey	4 September 1952 (aged 19)	47	13	Apprentice	20 April 1971	Free transfer
Bobby Mills	MF	(England)	Edmonton	16 March 1955 (aged 17)	3	0	Apprentice	4 March 1972	Free transfer
Bobby Roberts	MF	(Scotland)	Edinburgh	2 September 1940 (aged 31)	0	0	(England) Coventry City	1 March 1973	Free transfer
Phil Thomas	MF	(England)	Sherborne	14 December 1952 (aged 19)	0	0	(England) Bournemouth	Summer 1972	Free transfer
Tony Wingate	MF	(England)	Islington	21 March 1955 (aged 17)	1	0	Apprentice	18 March 1972	Free transfer
Forwards
Mick Mahon	WG	(England)	Manchester	17 September 1944 (aged 27)	96	19	(England) York City	May 1970	Free transfer
Bobby Svarc	FW	(England)	Leicester	8 February 1946 (aged 26)	0	0	(England) Boston United	December 1972	£6,000

== Transfers ==
=== In ===
Date	Position	Nationality	Name	From	Fee	Ref.
Summer 1972	GK	(Republic of Ireland)	Des Kelly	(England) Norwich City	Free transfer	
Summer 1972	CB	(England)	Martin Binks	(England) Orient	Free transfer	
Summer 1972	FB	(England)	Steve Wooldridge	(England) Crystal Palace	Free transfer	
Summer 1972	MF	(England)	Phil Thomas	(England) Bournemouth	Free transfer	
May 1972	FW	(England)	Bobby Moss	(England) Orient	Free transfer	
July 1972	CB	(England)	Bobby Noble	(England) Barrow	£1,000	
August 1972	CB	(Wales)	Stuart Morgan	(England) Reading	Free transfer	
26 August 1972	CB	(England)	John South	(England) Orient	Trial	(Note: Date of signing refers to the date of the player's first game for the club)
October 1972	MF	(England)	Jim Smith	(England) Boston United	Player-manager	
25 November 1972	GK	(Scotland)	John McInally	(England) Lincoln City	Free transfer	
December 1972	MF	(England)	Stan Brown	(England) Fulham	Free transfer	
December 1972	FW	(England)	Bobby Svarc	(England) Boston United	£6,000	
3 February 1973	CB	(England)	Ray Harford	(England) Port Vale	£1,750	
March 1973	MF	(Scotland)	Bobby Roberts	(England) Coventry City (Youth team coach)	Free transfer	

- Total spending: ▼ ~ £8,750

=== Out ===
Date	Position	Nationality	Name	To	Fee	Ref.
End of season	FW	(England)	Brian Gibbs	(England) Bletchley Town	Player-manager	
Summer 1972	CB	(England)	Bobby Howlett	(England) Bowers United	Released	
29 April 1972	FB	(England)	Eric Burgess	(England) Wealdstone	Released	(Note: Date of departure refers to the date of the player's final game for the club)
9 October 1972	CB	(England)	John South	(England) Orient	End of trial	
December 1972	FB	(England)	Steve Wooldridge	(England) Folkestone	Free transfer	
29 December 1972	FB	(England)	Brian Hall	(England) Chelmsford City	Released	
January 1973	CB	(England)	Martin Binks	(England) Cambridge United	Free transfer	
February 1973	GK	(Republic of Ireland)	Des Kelly	(England) Lowestoft Town	Released	
February 1973	FW	(England)	Bobby Moss	(England) Dover Athletic	Free transfer	
17 February 1973	GK	(England)	Barry Smith	(England) Walsall	Released	
March 1973	CB	(England)	Bobby Noble	(England) Southport	£2,000	
March 1973	FW	(England)	Dave Simmons	(England) Cambridge United	£3,000	
6 April 1973	MF	(England)	Jim Smith	(England) Colchester United	Manager	

- Total incoming: ▲ ~ £5,000

=== Loans in ===
Date	Position	Nationality	Name	From	End date	Ref.
10 November 1972	GK	(Scotland)	John McInally	(England) Lincoln City	10 November 1972	(Note: Loan start and end dates refer to the date of the player's first and final games for the club)
4 January 1973	CB	(England)	Ray Harford	(England) Port Vale	27 January 1973	

=== Loans out ===
Date	Position	Nationality	Name	To	End date	Ref.
November 1972	FB	(England)	Steve Wooldridge	(England) Folkestone	December 1972	
November 1972	FW	(England)	Bobby Moss	(England) Folkestone	December 1972	

== Match details ==
=== Fourth Division ===
==== Results round by round ====
Round	1	2	3	4	5	6	7	8	9	10	11	12	13	14	15	16	17	18	19	20	21	22	23	24	25	26	27	28	29	30	31	32	33	34	35	36	37	38	39	40	41	42	43	44	45	46
Ground	H	A	H	A	A	H	A	A	H	H	A	A	H	H	A	A	H	A	H	A	A	H	A	H	A	H	A	A	H	A	H	H	H	A	H	A	A	H	A	H	H	H	A	A	H	H
Result	W	L	L	L	L	W	L	L	D	D	L	L	L	D	L	D	D	L	W	W	L	W	L	D	L	W	W	L	L	L	D	L	D	L	L	L	D	D	L	W	W	L	D	L	L	W
Position	7	12	18	20	23	18	22	23	22	21	23	23	23	23	24	24	24	24	24	23	23	23	23	23	23	23	23	23	23	23	23	23	23	23	23	23	23	23	23	23	22	23	22	23	23	22

Source: 11v11.com
A = Away; H = Home; W = Win; D = Draw; L = Loss

==== League table ====
Pos	Team	Pld	W	D	L	GF	GA	GAv	Pts	Promotion or relegation
20	Hartlepool	46	12	17	17	34	49	0.694	41	
21	Crewe Alexandra	46	9	18	19	38	61	0.623	36	Re-elected
22	Colchester United	46	10	11	25	48	76	0.632	31	Re-elected
23	Northampton Town	46	10	11	25	40	73	0.548	31	Re-elected
24	Darlington	46	7	15	24	42	85	0.494	29	Re-elected

Source: rsssf.com

==== Matches ====
12 August 1972 1	Colchester United	1–0	Hereford United	Colchester
	Foley 47'	Report		Stadium: Layer Road; Attendance: 6,083; Referee: Keith Walker

19 August 1972 2	Hartlepool	2–1	Colchester United	Hartlepool
	Coyne 10'; Smith 70' (pen.)	Report	Green (o.g.)	Stadium: Victoria Park; Attendance: 5,472; Referee: J Hough

26 August 1972 3	Colchester United	1–3	Newport County	Colchester
	Mahon 66'	Report	Coldrick; Hawkins; Thomas	Stadium: Layer Road; Attendance: 3,639; Referee: D Harwood

30 August 1972 4	Chester	4–0	Colchester United	Chester
	Wallace 6' (pen.), 29' (pen.); Hollis 18'; Owen 79'	Report		Stadium: Sealand Road; Attendance: 4,304; Referee: J Wrennall

2 September 1972 5	Darlington	2–1	Colchester United	Darlington
	Sinclair 30' (pen.); Graham 69'	Report	Moss 23'	Stadium: Feethams; Attendance: 1,251; Referee: R Swallow

8 September 1972 6	Colchester United	5–1	Crewe Alexandra	Colchester
	Simmons 8', 58', 71'; Mahon 55'; McLaughlin 88'	Report	Nicholl 66'	Stadium: Layer Road; Attendance: 2,767

16 September 1972 7	Barnsley	4–0	Colchester United	Barnsley
	Mahoney 26', 65'; Greenwood 44', 69'	Report		Stadium: Oakwell; Attendance: 2,297; Referee: N Saul

20 September 1972 8	Southport	1–0	Colchester United	Southport
	Sibbald 57' (pen.)	Report		Stadium: Haig Avenue; Attendance: 2,527; Referee: R Capey

22 September 1972 9	Colchester United	2–2	Northampton Town	Colchester
	McLaughlin 24'; Mahon 32'	Report	Neal 2'; Robertson 64'	Stadium: Layer Road; Attendance: 3,543; Referee: J Bent

25 September 1972 10	Colchester United	0–0	Bradford City	Colchester
		Report		Stadium: Layer Road; Attendance: 3,474; Referee: Tommy Dawes

30 September 1972 11	Exeter City	1–0	Colchester United	Exeter
	Plumb 57'	Report		Stadium: St James Park; Attendance: 5,005; Referee: D Lloyd

7 October 1972 12	Lincoln City	3–2	Colchester United	Lincoln
	McNeil 11', 60' (pen.); Bradley 15'	Report	Simmons 62'; Moss 89'	Stadium: Sincil Bank; Attendance: 6,268; Referee: E White

9 October 1972 13	Colchester United	2–3	Aldershot	Colchester
	Moss 13'; Mahon 74'	Report	Melledew 58'; Stenson 60', 73'	Stadium: Layer Road; Attendance: 3,455; Referee: L Hart

13 October 1972 14	Colchester United	1–1	Workington	Colchester
	Simmons 32'	Report	Irving 75'; Rowlands (red card) 69'	Stadium: Layer Road; Attendance: 2,997; Referee: N Paget

20 October 1972 15	Cambridge United	3–0	Colchester United	Cambridge
	Ross 7'; Noble 28' (o.g.); Collins 81'	Report		Stadium: Abbey Stadium; Attendance: 4,465; Referee: R Clay

23 October 1972 16	Peterborough United	2–2	Colchester United	Peterborough
	Mahon 23', 33'	Report	Oakes 71'; Heath 82'	Stadium: London Road Stadium; Attendance: 5,648; Referee: D Civil

28 October 1972 17	Colchester United	1–1	Mansfield Town	Colchester
	Mahon 15'	Report	Ellis 62' (pen.)	Stadium: Layer Road; Attendance: 3,789; Referee: K Crofts

4 November 1972 18	Bradford City	3–0	Colchester United	Bradford
	Gilliver 18'; Brown 44'; Bairstow 89'	Report		Stadium: Valley Parade; Attendance: 3,047; Referee: R Boyles

10 November 1972 19	Colchester United	3–1	Southport	Colchester
	Mahon 36'; Thomas 48'; Foley 52'	Report	Lee 15'	Stadium: Layer Road; Attendance: 3,306; Referee: Ron Challis

25 November 1972 20	Reading	0–1	Colchester United	Reading
		Report	Foley 80'	Stadium: Elm Park; Attendance: 4,955; Referee: A Porter

16 December 1972 21	Doncaster Rovers	1–0	Colchester United	Doncaster
	Elwiss 65'	Report		Stadium: Belle Vue; Attendance: 1,880; Referee: T Bosi

23 December 1972 22	Colchester United	2–1	Bury	Colchester
	Morgan 29'; Foley 52'	Report	Jones 50'	Stadium: Layer Road; Attendance: 2,739; Referee: A Robinson

26 December 1972 23	Northampton Town	4–0	Colchester United	Northampton
	Baxter 27' (pen.); Riddick 33'; Hunt 55', 65'	Report		Stadium: County Ground; Attendance: 3,298; Referee: G Flint

29 December 1972 24	Colchester United	1–1	Hartlepool	Colchester
	Mahon 29'	Report	Veart 28'	Stadium: Layer Road; Attendance: 3,172; Referee: D Biddle

6 January 1973 25	Newport County	1–0	Colchester United	Newport
	Screen 51'	Report		Stadium: Somerton Park; Attendance: 3,465; Referee: K Baker

20 January 1973 26	Colchester United	1–0	Darlington	Colchester
	Mahon 54'	Report		Stadium: Layer Road; Attendance: 3,360; Referee: Malcolm Sinclair

27 January 1973 27	Crewe Alexandra	1–2	Colchester United	Crewe
	Unknown goalscorer	Report	Thomas 36'; Simmons 86'	Stadium: Gresty Road; Attendance: 1,825; Referee: A Jones

3 February 1973 28	Aldershot	2–0	Colchester United	Aldershot
	Walker 65' (pen.); Howarth 80'	Report		Stadium: Recreation Ground; Attendance: 3,574; Referee: A Lees

10 February 1973 29	Colchester United	1–2	Barnsley	Colchester
	Svarc 79'	Report	Lea 64'; Mahoney 87'	Stadium: Layer Road; Attendance: 3,148; Referee: Bob Matthewson

17 February 1973 30	Hereford United	4–1	Colchester United	Hereford
	Tucker 2', 65'; Gregory 40'; Redrobe 83'	Report	Svarc 78'	Stadium: Edgar Street; Attendance: 7,624; Referee: J Rice

24 February 1973 31	Colchester United	1–1	Doncaster Rovers	Colchester
	Foley 2'	Report	Unknown goalscorer	Stadium: Layer Road; Attendance: 2,550; Referee: John Homewood

3 March 1973 32	Colchester United	0–2	Lincoln City	Colchester
		Report	Unknown goalscorer	Stadium: Layer Road; Attendance: 2,649; Referee: P Walters

5 March 1973 33	Colchester United	1–1	Torquay United	Colchester
	Leslie 60' (pen.)	Report	Unknown goalscorer	Stadium: Layer Road; Attendance: 2,639; Referee: I Hunting

10 March 1973 34	Workington	1–0	Colchester United	Workington
	McDonald 51'	Report		Stadium: Borough Park; Attendance: 1,297; Referee: R Perkin

16 March 1973 35	Colchester United	0–1	Cambridge United	Colchester
		Report	Ross 46'	Stadium: Layer Road; Attendance: 3,888; Referee: Alf Grey

19 March 1973 36	Stockport County	2–0	Colchester United	Stockport
	Griffiths 47'; Garbett 80'	Report		Stadium: Edgeley Park; Attendance: 3,056; Referee: D Laing

24 March 1973 37	Mansfield Town	1–1	Colchester United	Mansfield
	Ellis 74'	Report	Foley 65'	Stadium: Field Mill; Attendance: 4,664; Referee: D Richardson

30 March 1973 38	Colchester United	2–2	Reading	Colchester
	Svarc 25'; Leslie 41' (pen.)	Report	Cumming; Hunt	Stadium: Layer Road; Attendance: 3,092; Referee: T Spencer

6 April 1973 39	Gillingham	2–1	Colchester United	Gillingham
	Yeo 45'; Jacques 75'	Report	Svarc 48' (pen.)	Stadium: Priestfield Stadium; Attendance: 3,072; Referee: M Davey

9 April 1973 40	Colchester United	1–0	Peterborough United	Colchester
	Foley	Report		Stadium: Layer Road; Attendance: 2,437; Referee: T Dawes

13 April 1973 41	Colchester United	3–0	Stockport County	Colchester
	Mahon 28', 60'; Svarc 84'	Report		Stadium: Layer Road; Attendance: 2,772; Referee: Gordon Hill

16 April 1973 42	Colchester United	1–2	Exeter City	Colchester
	Svarc 43'	Report	Binney 36', 46'	Stadium: Layer Road; Attendance: 3,489; Referee: Ken Burns

20 April 1973 43	Torquay United	0–0	Colchester United	Torquay
		Report		Stadium: Plainmoor; Attendance: 4,081; Referee: John Homewood

23 April 1973 44	Bury	4–0	Colchester United	Bury
	Connelly 17'; Murray 28'; Warburton 30'; Tinsley 64'	Report		Stadium: Gigg Lane; Attendance: 3,079; Referee: P Baldwin

27 April 1973 45	Colchester United	2–3	Chester	Colchester
	Harford 59'; Svarc 75'	Report	James 4', 35'; Davies 18'	Stadium: Layer Road; Attendance: 2,689; Referee: W Gow

30 April 1973 46	Colchester United	4–0	Gillingham	Colchester
	Svarc 5'; Foley 12'; Leslie 37'; L Smith 90'	Report		Stadium: Layer Road; Attendance: 2,590; Referee: D Nippard

=== League Cup ===
16 August 1972 1st round	Gillingham	1–0	Colchester United	Gillingham
	Noble (o.g.)	Report		Stadium: Priestfield Stadium; Attendance: 3,966; Referee: D Nippard

=== FA Cup ===
18 November 1972 1st round	Colchester United	6–0	Bognor Regis Town	Colchester
	Simmons 9', 23', 54'; Morgan 43'; Hall 45'; Foley 52'	Report		Stadium: Layer Road; Attendance: 4,321; Referee: C Smith

9 December 1972 2nd round	Bournemouth	0–0	Colchester United	Bournemouth
		Report		Stadium: Dean Court; Attendance: 11,164; Referee: M Sinclair

11 December 1972 2nd round replay	Colchester United	0–2	Bournemouth	Colchester
		Report	Clark 8'; Boyer 35'	Stadium: Layer Road; Attendance: 7,419; Referee: M Sinclair

== Squad statistics ==
=== Appearances and goals ===
No.	Pos	Nat	Player	Total		Fourth Division		FA Cup		League Cup	
No.	Pos	Nat	Player	Apps	Goals	Apps	Goals	Apps	Goals	Apps	Goals
	GK	(Scotland) SCO	John McInally	29	0	27	0	2	0	0	0
	DF	(England) ENG	Richard Bourne	2	0	2	0	0	0	0	0
	DF	(England) ENG	Micky Cook	45	0	43	0	2	0	0	0
	DF	(England) ENG	Ray Harford	21	1	21	1	0	0	0	0
	DF	(England) ENG	John McLaughlin	44	2	40	2	3	0	1	0
	DF	(Wales) WAL	Stuart Morgan	36	2	30+2	1	3	1	1	0
	DF	(England) ENG	Lindsay Smith	35	1	26+5	1	3	0	1	0
	MF	(England) ENG	Phil Bloss	16	0	12+2	0	0+2	0	0	0
	MF	(England) ENG	Stan Brown	23	0	23	0	0	0	0	0
	MF	(England) ENG	Steve Foley	40	9	36	8	3	1	1	0
	MF	(England) ENG	Steve Leslie	33	3	27+3	3	2	0	1	0
	MF	(England) ENG	Bobby Mills	5	0	3+2	0	0	0	0	0
	MF	(Scotland) SCO	Bobby Roberts	2	0	0+2	0	0	0	0	0
	MF	(England) ENG	Phil Thomas	35	2	32+1	2	1	0	1	0
	FW	(England) ENG	Mick Mahon	48	12	44	12	3	0	1	0
	FW	(England) ENG	Bobby Svarc	20	8	20	8	0	0	0	0
Players who appeared for Colchester who left during the season
	GK	(England) ENG	Barry Smith	19	0	18	0	0	0	1	0
	GK	(Republic of Ireland) IRL	Des Kelly	2	0	1	0	1	0	0	0
	DF	(England) ENG	Martin Binks	10	0	10	0	0	0	0	0
	DF	(England) ENG	Brian Hall	18	1	14+1	0	3	1	0	0
	DF	(England) ENG	Bobby Noble	31	0	25+2	0	3	0	1	0
	DF	(England) ENG	John South	4	0	4	0	0	0	0	0
	DF	(England) ENG	Steve Wooldridge	4	0	3	0	0	0	1	0
	MF	(England) ENG	Jim Smith	9	0	7+1	0	1	0	0	0
	FW	(England) ENG	Bobby Moss	19	3	16+2	3	0	0	1	0
	FW	(England) ENG	Dave Simmons	28	9	22+2	6	3	3	0+1	0

=== Goalscorers ===
Place	Nationality	Position	Name	Fourth Division	FA Cup	League Cup	Total
1	(England)	WG	Mick Mahon	12	0	0	12
2	(England)	MF	Steve Foley	8	1	0	9
2	(England)	FW	Dave Simmons	6	3	0	9
4	(England)	FW	Bobby Svarc	8	0	0	8
5	(England)	MF	Steve Leslie	3	0	0	3
5	(England)	FW	Bobby Moss	3	0	0	3
7	(England)	FB	John McLaughlin	2	0	0	2
7	(Wales)	CB	Stuart Morgan	1	1	0	2
7	(England)	MF	Phil Thomas	2	0	0	2
10	(England)	FB	Brian Hall	1	0	0	1
10	(England)	CB	Ray Harford	1	0	0	1
10	(England)	CB	Lindsay Smith	1	0	0	1
			Own goals	1	0	0	1
			TOTALS	48	6	0	54

=== Disciplinary record ===
Nationality	Position	Name	Fourth Division		FA Cup		League Cup		Total	
Nationality	Position	Name	Booked	Sent off (straight red)	Booked	Sent off (straight red)	Booked	Sent off (straight red)	Booked	Sent off (straight red)
(Wales)	CB	Stuart Morgan	2	1	0	0	0	0	2	1
(England)	CB	Lindsay Smith	1	0	1	0	0	0	2	0
(England)	FB	Brian Hall	1	0	0	0	0	0	1	0
(England)	CB	Ray Harford	1	0	0	0	0	0	1	0
(England)	CB	Bobby Noble	1	0	0	0	0	0	1	0
		TOTALS	6	1	1	0	0	0	7	1

=== Clean sheets ===
Number of games goalkeepers kept a clean sheet.

Place	Nationality	Player	Fourth Division	FA Cup	League Cup	Total
1	(Scotland)	John McInally	6	1	0	7
2	(England)	Barry Smith	2	0	0	2
2	(Republic of Ireland)	Des Kelly	0	1	0	1
		TOTALS	8	2	0	10

=== Player debuts ===
Players making their first-team Colchester United debut in a fully competitive match.

Position	Nationality	Player	Date	Opponent	Ground	Notes
CB	(Wales)	Stuart Morgan	12 August 1972	Hereford United	Layer Road	
CB	(England)	Bobby Noble	12 August 1972	Hereford United	Layer Road	
FB	(England)	Steve Wooldridge	12 August 1972	Hereford United	Layer Road	
FW	(England)	Bobby Moss	12 August 1972	Hereford United	Layer Road	
MF	(England)	Phil Thomas	16 August 1972	Gillingham	Priestfield Stadium	
CB	(England)	Martin Binks	19 August 1972	Hartlepool	Victoria Park	
CB	(England)	John South	26 August 1972	Newport County	Layer Road	
GK	(Republic of Ireland)	Des Kelly	4 November 1972	Bradford City	Valley Parade	
GK	(Scotland)	John McInally	10 November 1972	Southport	Layer Road	
MF	(England)	Jim Smith	10 November 1972	Southport	Layer Road	
GK	(Scotland)	John McInally	25 November 1972	Reading	Elm Park	(Note: Second debut for the club)
MF	(England)	Stan Brown	29 December 1972	Hartlepool	Layer Road	
FW	(England)	Bobby Svarc	29 December 1972	Hartlepool	Layer Road	
CB	(England)	Ray Harford	6 January 1973	Newport County	Somerton Park	
CB	(England)	Ray Harford	3 February 1973	Aldershot	Recreation Ground	
MF	(Scotland)	Bobby Roberts	16 March 1973	Cambridge United	Layer Road	

== See also ==
- List of Colchester United F.C. seasons
