= Colchester United F.C. Player of the Year =

Association football accolade

Colchester United Football Club is an English association football club based in Colchester, Essex that currently competes in Football League One. The Colchester United Player of the Year award is voted for annually by Colchester United's supporters to name a player who has been the club's best performer over the course of a campaign.

Mike Walker won the award three times, in 1980, 1981 and 1982, and was also the first to win the award in consecutive seasons. Tom Eastman matched this feat in 2018, having also won in 2014 and 2015. He surpassed this record to win a fourth award in 2020. Five other players have won the award twice since the inaugural award in 1965.

Three players who won the award later went on to manage the club, including Steve Wignall, Mike Walker and Steve Whitton.

== Key ==
	Description
Player	Colchester United Hall of Fame inductee
Apps	Appearances.
Player (X)	Number of times a player has won the award.

== List of winners ==
Season	Level^{[1]}	Name	Position	Nationality	Apps^{[2]}	Goals^{[2]}	Ref
1964–65	3	Percy Ames	Goalkeeper	England	30	0	
1965–66	4	Brian Hall	Defender	England	50	11	
1966–67	3	Duncan Forbes	Defender	Scotland	49	1	
1967–68	3	Derek Trevis	Midfielder	England	51	4	
1968–69	4	Brian Hall (2)	Defender	England	50	6	
1969–70	4	Ken Jones	Midfielder	England	28	16	
1970–71	4	Ray Crawford	Forward	England	55	31	
1971–72	4	Micky Cook	Defender	England	40	1	
1972–73	4	Mick Mahon	Midfielder	England	48	12	
1973–74	4	Ray Harford	Defender	England	48	2	
1974–75	3	John Froggatt	Forward	England	54	18	
1975–76	3	Lindsay Smith	Defender	England	45	6	
1976–77	4	Steve Dowman	Defender	England	42	12	
1977–78	3	Steve Leslie	Midfielder	England	49	3	
1978–79	3	Steve Wignall	Defender	England	51	4	
1979–80	3	Mike Walker	Goalkeeper	Wales	54	0	
1980–81	3	Mike Walker (2)	Goalkeeper	Wales	52	0	
1981–82	4	Kevin Bremner	Forward	Scotland	46	24	
1982–83	4	Mike Walker (3)	Goalkeeper	Wales	50	0	
1983–84	4	Steve Wignall (2)	Defender	England	45	10	
1984–85	4	Alec Chamberlain	Goalkeeper	England	54	0	
1985–86	4	Roger Osborne	Midfielder	England	38	1	
1986–87	4	Rudi Hedman	Defender	England	54	5	
1987–88	4	Colin Hill	Defender	Northern Ireland	30	1	
1988–89	4	Colin Hill (2)	Defender	Northern Ireland	52	1	
1989–90	4	Neale Marmon	Defender	England	22	4	
1990–91	5	Scott Barrett	Goalkeeper	England	51	0	
1991–92	5	Nicky Smith	Midfielder	England	55	11	
1992–93	4	Paul Roberts	Defender	England	50	1	
1993–94	4	Mark Kinsella	Midfielder	Republic of Ireland	48	10	
1994–95	4	Steve Whitton	Forward	England	44	13	
1995–96	4	Mark Kinsella (2)	Midfielder	Republic of Ireland	54	9	
1996–97	4	Chris Fry	Midfielder	Wales	54	8	
1997–98	4	Richard Wilkins	Midfielder	England	43	5	
1998–99	3	David Greene	Defender	Republic of Ireland	46	8	
1999–2000	3	David Greene (2)	Defender	Republic of Ireland	32	1	
2000–01	3	Mick Stockwell	Midfielder	England	52	11	
2001–02	3	Karl Duguid	Midfielder	England	45	5	
2002–03	3	Simon Brown	Goalkeeper	England	29	0	
2003–04	3	Alan White	Defender	England	46	1	
2004–05	3	Pat Baldwin	Defender	England	46	0	
2005–06	3	Wayne Brown	Defender	England	45	3	
2006–07	2	Jamie Cureton	Forward	England	46	24	
2007–08	2	Johnnie Jackson	Midfielder	England	48	7	
2008–09	3	Dean Hammond	Midfielder	England	47	5	
2009–10	3	Ben Williams	Goalkeeper	England	49	0	
2010–11	3	David Perkins	Midfielder	England	41	1	
2011–12	3	Kayode Odejayi	Forward	Nigeria	47	5	
2012–13	3	Jabo Ibehre	Forward	England	31	8	
2013–14	3	Tom Eastman	Defender	England	39	2	
2014–15	3	Tom Eastman (2)	Defender	England	51	1	
2015–16	3	Alex Gilbey	Midfielder	England	42	5	
2016–17	4	Brennan Dickenson	Forward	England	39	12	
2017–18	4	Tom Eastman (3)	Defender	England	45	3	
2018–19	4	Frankie Kent	Defender	England	43	5	
2019–20	4	Tom Eastman (4)	Defender	England	47	3	
2020–21	4	Noah Chilvers	Midfielder	England	49	3	
2021–22	4	Shamal George	Goalkeeper	England	30	0	
2022–23	4	Junior Tchamadeu	Defender	Cameroon	46	5	
2023–24	4	Arthur Read	Midfielder	England	46	5	
2024–25	4	Jack Payne	Midfielder	England	49	9	

== Wins by playing position ==
Position	Players	Total
Goalkeeper	7	9
Defender	16	24
Midfielder	17	17
Forward	8	8

== Wins by nationality ==
Nationality	Players	Total
England	40	45
Republic of Ireland	2	4
Wales	2	4
Northern Ireland	1	2
Scotland	2	2
Nigeria	1	1

== See also ==
- List of Colchester United F.C. seasons
- List of Colchester United F.C. records and statistics

== Notes ==
1. : The official "Level" of competition in the structure of the English league system.
2. : Appearances and goals from the season the player won the award, including appearances and goals in The Football League and play-offs, Football Conference, FA Cup, Football League Cup, Associate Members Cup/Football League Trophy, FA Trophy, Conference League Cup and Watney Cup.
