= 1971–72 Colchester United F.C. season =

Colchester United
1971–72 season
- Chairman: Roy Chapman
- Manager: Dick Graham
- Stadium: Layer Road
- Fourth Division: 11th
- FA Cup: 1st round (eliminated by Shrewsbury Town)
- League Cup: 3rd round (eliminated by Blackpool)
- Watney Cup: Winners
- Top goalscorer: League: Brian Lewis (15); All: Brian Lewis (23)
- Highest home attendance: 9,807 v Southend United, 18 October 1971
- Lowest home attendance: 3,390 v Workington, 7 April 1972
- Average home league attendance: 5,695
- Biggest win: 4–1 v Swindon Town, 8 September 1971 v Southend United, 28 January 1972; 5–2 v Lincoln City, 15 October 1971; 3–0 v Exeter City, 26 November 1971
- Biggest defeat: 0–4 v Blackpool, 5 October 1971 v Peterborough United, 1 April 1972
Home colours

The 1971–72 season was Colchester United's 30th season in their history and their fourth successive season in the fourth tier of English football, the Fourth Division. Alongside competing in the Fourth Division, the club also participated in the FA Cup and the League Cup, as well as being entered into the pre-season Watney Cup.

Continuing with their cup success of the previous season, Dick Graham's high-scoring side were entered into the Watney Cup, a pre-season tournament held between the two highest scoring teams in each of the four divisions in the Football League who had not achieved promotion or entered European football. Colchester defeated West Bromwich Albion in their first ever penalty shoot-out following a 4–4 draw at The Hawthorns.

Colchester reached the third round of the League Cup, where they were knocked out by Blackpool, and were eliminated from the FA Cup in the first round by Shrewsbury Town. Meanwhile, the U's ended their league campaign in eleventh position, nine points away from promotion.

== Season overview ==
Colchester's goalscoring exploits of the previous campaign enabled qualification for the 1971–72 pre-season Watney Cup competition, open to the two highest scoring teams from each division, exclusively for teams that had not achieved promotion or entered into European competition. Both Luton Town and Carlisle United were beaten at Layer Road ahead of the final, held against West Bromwich Albion at their Hawthorns stadium. The encounter registered four goals apiece, taking the fixture to a penalty shoot-out. Albion missed two penalties, while Colchester youngster Phil Bloss scored the decisive spot kick to win the competition.

Although early favourites for promotion, a club debt of over £21,000 meant that manager Dick Graham needed to inject youth into his ageing side, bringing apprentices Steve Leslie, Steve Foley, Lindsay Smith, Micky Cook and John McLaughlin to name but a few into the first-team picture during the season. All became regulars but youth alone was not sufficient for Colchester to maintain a promotion push as they finished the season in eleventh position, nine points adrift of promotion.

Meanwhile, Colchester experienced a brief run in the League Cup, defeating Brentford and Swindon Town at Layer Road in the first and second rounds respectively, but were heavily beaten at Blackpool in round three. An early exit in the FA Cup followed. After reaching the quarter-final stage last season, the U's were humbled 4–1 at home to Shrewsbury Town in the first round.

== Players ==
As of match played 29 April 1972.

Name	Position	Nationality	Place of birth	Date of birth	Apps	Goals	Signed from	Date signed	Fee
Goalkeepers
Barry Smith	GK	(England)	Colchester	3 March 1953 (aged 18)	0	0	Apprentice	July 1971	Free transfer
Defenders
Richard Bourne	CB	(England)	Colchester	9 December 1954 (aged 16)	0	0	Apprentice	3 April 1972 (Note: Date of signing refers to the date of the player's first game for the club)	Free transfer
Eric Burgess	FB	(England)	Edgware	27 October 1944 (aged 26)	10	1	(England) Plymouth Argyle	December 1970	Free transfer
Micky Cook	FB	(England)	Enfield	9 April 1951 (aged 20)	61	0	(England) Orient	1 March 1969	Free transfer
Brian Hall	LB	(England)	Burbage	9 March 1939 (aged 32)	305	31	(England) Mansfield Town	March 1965	Free transfer
Bobby Howlett	CB	(England)	West Ham	12 December 1948 (aged 22)	18	0	(England) Southend United	Summer 1968	Free transfer
John McLaughlin	FB	(England)	Edmonton	29 October 1954 (aged 16)	0	0	Apprentice	18 March 1972	Free transfer
Lindsay Smith	CB	(England)	Enfield	18 September 1954 (aged 16)	1	0	Apprentice	20 April 1971	Free transfer
Midfielders
Phil Bloss	MF	(England)	Colchester	16 January 1953 (aged 18)	1	1	Apprentice	January 1971	Free transfer
Steve Foley	MF	(England)	Clacton-on-Sea	21 June 1953 (aged 17)	0	0	Apprentice	July 1969	Free transfer
Steve Leslie	MF	(England)	Hornsey	4 September 1952 (aged 18)	2	0	Apprentice	20 April 1971	Free transfer
Bobby Mills	MF	(England)	Edmonton	16 March 1955 (aged 16)	0	0	Apprentice	4 March 1972	Free transfer
Tony Wingate	MF	(England)	Islington	21 March 1955 (aged 16)	0	0	Apprentice	18 March 1972	Free transfer
Forwards
Brian Gibbs	FW	(England)	Gillingham	6 October 1936 (aged 34)	138	36	(England) Gillingham	September 1968	£8,000
Mick Mahon	WG	(England)	Manchester	17 September 1944 (aged 26)	47	7	(England) York City	May 1970	Free transfer
Dave Simmons	FW	(England)	Ryde	24 October 1948 (aged 22)	15	6	(England) Aston Villa	26 December 1970	£6,000

== Transfers ==
=== In ===
Date	Position	Nationality	Name	From	Fee	Ref.
July 1971	CB	(England)	Barry Smith	Apprentice	Free transfer	
4 March 1972	MF	(England)	Bobby Mills	Apprentice	Free transfer	(Note: Date of signing refers to the date of the player's first game for the club)
18 March 1972	FB	(England)	John McLaughlin	Apprentice	Free transfer	
18 March 1972	MF	(England)	Tony Wingate	Apprentice	Free transfer	
3 April 1972	CB	(England)	Richard Bourne	Apprentice	Free transfer	

=== Out ===
Date	Position	Nationality	Name	To	Fee	Ref.
End of season	CB	(England)	Trevor Painter	(England) Wealdstone	Released	
End of season	WG	(England)	Ray Whittaker	(England) King's Lynn	Released	
Summer 1971	WG	(England)	Micky Brown	(England) Wealdstone	Released	
31 May 1971	DF	(England)	Adrian Webster	(England) Hillingdon Borough	Released	
July 1971	GK	(England)	Brian Sherratt	(England) Oxford City	Released	
31 July 1971	FW	(England)	Ray Crawford	(South Africa) Durban City	Released	(Note: Date of departure refers to the date of the player's final game for the club)
13 November 1971	GK	(England)	Graham Smith	(England) West Bromwich Albion	£11,000	
December 1971	CB	(Scotland)	John Kurila	(England) Lincoln City	Free transfer	
January 1972	CB	(England)	Alan Dennis	(England) Dover	Free transfer	
January 1972	WG	(England)	Brian Owen	(England) Wolverhampton Wanderers	Player-coach	
March 1972	FB	(Scotland)	John Gilchrist	(England) Tonbridge	Player-coach	
March 1972	MF	(England)	Ken Jones	(England) Margate	Released	
31 March 1972	FB	(England)	Bobby Cram	Royal Canada	Free transfer	
3 April 1972	MF	(England)	Brian Lewis	(England) Portsmouth	£8,500	
24 April 1972	CB	(England)	Brian Garvey	(England) Bedford Town	Player-manager	

- Total incoming: ▲ ~ £19,500

=== Loans in ===
Date	Position	Nationality	Name	From	End date	Ref.
26 November 1971	FB	(England)	Charlie Woods	(England) Watford	18 December 1972	(Note: Loan start and end dates refer to the date of the player's first and final games for the club)
March 1972	MF	(England)	David Burnside	(England) Bristol City	29 April 1972	

== Match details ==
=== Fourth Division ===
==== Results round by round ====
Round	1	2	3	4	5	6	7	8	9	10	11	12	13	14	15	16	17	18	19	20	21	22	23	24	25	26	27	28	29	30	31	32	33	34	35	36	37	38	39	40	41	42	43	44	45	46
Ground	A	H	A	A	H	A	H	A	A	H	A	H	H	A	H	A	H	H	A	A	H	A	H	A	H	A	A	H	A	H	A	H	H	A	A	H	H	A	A	H	H	A	H	H	H	A
Result	L	W	L	L	W	L	W	D	L	W	W	W	W	L	D	D	D	W	D	L	D	W	D	L	D	W	L	D	W	L	W	W	L	L	L	W	W	L	L	W	W	D	L	W	L	W
Position	20	6	20	22	14	22	15	17	18	16	14	9	7	10	8	12	12	8	9	12	10	9	9	11	11	10	12	13	10	11	10	8	9	12	12	11	10	10	10	9	9	8	8	8	9	11

Source: 11v11.com
A = Away; H = Home; W = Win; D = Draw; L = Loss

==== League table ====
Pos	Team	Pld	W	D	L	GF	GA	GAv	Pts
9	Bury	46	19	12	15	73	59	1.237	50
10	Cambridge United	46	17	14	15	62	60	1.033	48
11	Colchester United	46	19	10	17	70	69	1.014	48
12	Doncaster Rovers	46	16	14	16	56	63	0.889	46
13	Gillingham	46	16	13	17	61	67	0.910	45

Source: rsssf.com

==== Matches ====
14 August 1971 1	Lincoln City	2–0	Colchester United	Lincoln
	Hubbard 51'; Smith 63'	Report		Stadium: Sincil Bank; Attendance: 6,607; Referee: H Powell

20 August 1971 2	Colchester United	1–0	Hartlepool	Colchester
	Ashurst 74' (o.g.)	Report		Stadium: Layer Road; Attendance: 5,634; Referee: H Robinson

28 August 1971 3	Bury	3–0	Colchester United	Bury
	Jones 11', 13'; White 70'	Report		Stadium: Gigg Lane; Attendance: 2,557; Referee: Peter Willis

31 August 1971 4	Newport County	2–1	Colchester United	Newport
	Sprague 3'; Brown 88'	Report	Lewis 33'	Stadium: Somerton Park; Attendance: 4,168; Referee: T Bosi

3 September 1971 5	Colchester United	1–0	Southport	Colchester
	Mahon 57'	Report		Stadium: Layer Road; Attendance: 5,439

11 September 1971 6	Darlington	2–0	Colchester United	Darlington
	Harding 83'; Gauden 84'	Report		Stadium: Feethams; Attendance: 2,683; Referee: H Hackney

17 September 1971 7	Colchester United	4–2	Crewe Alexandra	Colchester
	Burgess 22'; Lewis 59'; Mahon 67'; Leslie 77'	Report	East 21'; Morrissey 52'	Stadium: Layer Road; Attendance: 6,133; Referee: P Reeves

25 September 1971 8	Northampton Town	1–1	Colchester United	Northampton
	Hawkins 67'	Report	Hall 75'	Stadium: County Ground; Attendance: 5,800; Referee: J Whalley

28 September 1971 9	Scunthorpe United	2–0	Colchester United	Scunthorpe
	Fletcher 7'; Davidson 17'	Report		Stadium: Old Showground; Attendance: 5,111; Referee: T Farley

1 October 1971 10	Colchester United	1–0	Chester	Colchester
	Leslie 9'	Report		Stadium: Layer Road; Attendance: 6,048; Referee: M Kerkhoff

9 October 1971 11	Aldershot	0–2	Colchester United	Aldershot
		Report	Lewis 22'; Leslie 24'	Stadium: Recreation Ground; Attendance: 5,285; Referee: L Hayes

15 October 1971 12	Colchester United	5–2	Lincoln City	Colchester
	Lewis 2', 71', 74'; Bloss 45'; Hall 86'	Report	Freeman 20', 24'	Stadium: Layer Road; Attendance: 5,834; Referee: J Orpin

18 October 1971 13	Colchester United	1–0	Southend United	Colchester
	Leslie 78'	Report		Stadium: Layer Road; Attendance: 9,807; Referee: John Homewood

23 October 1971 14	Cambridge United	4–2	Colchester United	Cambridge
	Foote 45'; Lill 50'; Harris 73', 87'	Report	Jones 61'; Thompson 67' (o.g.)	Stadium: Abbey Stadium; Attendance: 7,230

29 October 1971 15	Colchester United	2–2	Gillingham	Colchester
	Lewis 63'; Kurila 90'	Report	Yeo 31'; Peach 58' (pen.)	Stadium: Layer Road; Attendance: 6,622; Referee: Tommy Dawes

6 November 1971 16	Barrow	2–2	Colchester United	Barrow-in-Furness
	Patrick 19'; Irvine 39'	Report	Gibbs 35'; Kurila 78'	Stadium: Holker Street; Attendance: 1,954

13 November 1971 17	Colchester United	1–1	Brentford	Colchester
	Jones 14'	Report	O'Mara 26'	Stadium: Layer Road; Attendance: 6,698; Referee: J Bent

26 November 1971 18	Colchester United	3–0	Exeter City	Colchester
	Foley 20', 25'; Lewis 75'	Report		Stadium: Layer Road; Attendance: 5,116

3 December 1971 19	Stockport County	2–2	Colchester United	Stockport
	Lawther 60' (pen.); Garvey 75' (o.g.)	Report	Mahon 20', 73'	Stadium: Edgeley Park; Attendance: 2,043; Referee: Peter Willis

18 December 1971 20	Southport	3–0	Colchester United	Southport
	Redrobe 16'; Peat 43'; Sibbald 62' (pen.)	Report		Stadium: Haig Avenue; Attendance: 2,657; Referee: D Civil

27 December 1971 21	Colchester United	1–1	Peterborough United	Colchester
	Leslie 84'	Report	Hall 59'	Stadium: Layer Road; Attendance: 7,750; Referee: H Robinson

1 January 1972 22	Crewe Alexandra	2–4	Colchester United	Crewe
	Bradshaw 45'; East 75'	Report	Leslie 24'; Hall 51'; Lewis 52' (pen.); Cook 76'	Stadium: Gresty Road; Attendance: 1,992; Referee: E Jolly

8 January 1972 23	Colchester United	0–0	Bury	Colchester
		Report		Stadium: Layer Road; Attendance: 4,924

15 January 1972 24	Doncaster Rovers	2–0	Colchester United	Doncaster
	Elwiss 36'; Haselden 90'	Report		Stadium: Belle Vue; Attendance: 3,247; Referee: J Goggins

21 January 1972 25	Colchester United	1–1	Scunthorpe United	Colchester
	Gibbs 9'	Report	Fletcher 4'	Stadium: Layer Road; Attendance: 4,867

28 January 1972 26	Southend United	1–4	Colchester United	Southend-on-Sea
	Taylor 30'	Report	Foley 22'; Mahon 25'; Leslie 68', 73'	Stadium: Roots Hall; Attendance: 8,871; Referee: A Hart

5 February 1972 27	Workington	1–0	Colchester United	Workington
	Ogilvie 55'	Report		Stadium: Borough Park; Attendance: 2,170; Referee: P Baldwin

12 February 1972 28	Colchester United	1–1	Cambridge United	Colchester
14:45 GMT	Lewis 66'	Report	Lill 87'	Stadium: Layer Road; Attendance: 5,663; Referee: John Homewood

19 February 1972 29	Gillingham	0–2	Colchester United	Gillingham
		Report	Leslie 46', 57'	Stadium: Priestfield Stadium; Attendance: 5,313; Referee: I Hunting

26 February 1972 30	Colchester United	0–1	Barrow	Colchester
		Report	Rowlands 80'	Stadium: Layer Road; Attendance: 4,618

4 March 1972 31	Brentford	0–2	Colchester United	Brentford
		Report	Mahon 48'; Lewis 70'	Stadium: Griffin Park; Attendance: 9,210; Referee: J Yates

11 March 1972 32	Colchester United	1–0	Aldershot	Colchester
	Lewis 12'	Report		Stadium: Layer Road; Attendance: 3,776; Referee: R Perkin

13 March 1972 33	Colchester United	1–2	Doncaster Rovers	Colchester
	L Smith 68'	Report	Irvine 20'; Elwiss 43'	Stadium: Layer Road; Attendance: 5,004; Referee: Malcolm Sinclair

18 March 1972 34	Hartlepool	3–2	Colchester United	Hartlepool
	Waddell 10'; Smith 20' (pen.); Young 60'	Report	Mahon 43'; Garvey 83'	Stadium: Victoria Park; Attendance: 2,621

21 March 1972 35	Grimsby Town	3–0	Colchester United	Cleethorpes
	Gauden 7'; Brace 85' (pen.); Tees 87'	Report		Stadium: Blundell Park; Attendance: 13,288; Referee: H Davey

24 March 1972 36	Colchester United	4–3	Darlington	Colchester
	Burgess 11'; Leslie 42'; Lewis 52'; Simmons 68'	Report	Graham 33', 69'; Barker 74'	Stadium: Layer Road; Attendance: 3,865; Referee: D Biddle

31 March 1972 37	Colchester United	2–0	Northampton Town	Colchester
	Simmons 16'; Lewis 41' (pen.)	Report		Stadium: Layer Road; Attendance: 5,375

1 April 1972 38	Peterborough United	4–0	Colchester United	Peterborough
	Price 20'; Hall 33'; Turner 35' (pen.); Robson 70'	Report		Stadium: London Road Stadium; Attendance: 4,367

3 April 1972 39	Chester	2–1	Colchester United	Chester
	Moore 44', 87'	Report	Lewis 79' (pen.)	Stadium: Sealand Road; Attendance: 3,317

7 April 1972 40	Colchester United	1–0	Workington	Colchester
19:00 BST	Foley 57'	Report		Stadium: Layer Road; Attendance: 3,390; Referee: R Toseland

10 April 1972 41	Colchester United	2–1	Reading	Colchester
	Gibbs 30'; Leslie 76'	Report	Habbin 3'	Stadium: Layer Road; Attendance: 4,110; Referee: Tommy Dawes

15 April 1972 42	Exeter City	3–3	Colchester United	Exeter
	Binney 16'; Rowan 58'; Banks 71'	Report	Gibbs 30' (pen.); Burgess 63'; Mahon 82'	Stadium: St James Park; Attendance: 4,052; Referee: P Jones

17 April 1972 43	Colchester United	0–1	Grimsby Town	Colchester
		Report	Chatterley 9'	Stadium: Layer Road; Attendance: 5,086; Referee: Jack Taylor

21 April 1972 44	Colchester United	3–2	Stockport County	Colchester
	Burgess 63', 83'; Simmons 87'	Report	Griffiths 33'; McMillan 41'	Stadium: Layer Road; Attendance: 4,010; Referee: R Crabb

24 April 1972 45	Colchester United	2–3	Newport County	Colchester
	Burgess 38', 42'	Report	Brown 45'; Hill 54' (pen.); Jones 72'	Stadium: Layer Road; Attendance: 4,311; Referee: Ron Challis

29 April 1972 46	Reading	2–4	Colchester United	Reading
	Habbin 10'; Harman 72'	Report	Leslie 21'; L Smith 42', 65'; Burgess 61'	Stadium: Elm Park; Attendance: 3,202; Referee: W Castle

=== Watney Cup ===
31 July 1971 1st round	Colchester United	1–0	Luton Town	Colchester
	Lewis 78' (pen.)	Report		Stadium: Layer Road; Attendance: 8,186; Referee: Norman Burtenshaw

4 August 1971 Semi-final	Colchester United	2–0	Carlisle United	Colchester
	Gibbs 46'; Lewis 52'	Report		Stadium: Layer Road; Attendance: 7,871; Referee: Ray Tinkler

7 August 1971 Final	West Bromwich Albion	4–4 (2–4 p)	Colchester United	West Bromwich
	Cantello 16'; Astle 30', 89'; Hope 34'	Report	Mahon 8', 67'; Simmons 32'; Lewis 86' (pen.)	Stadium: The Hawthorns; Attendance: 18,487

=== League Cup ===
18 August 1971 1st round	Colchester United	3–1	Brentford	Colchester
	Mahon 33'; Lewis 53', 67' (pen.)	Report	Ross 87'	Stadium: Layer Road; Attendance: 6,125; Referee: K Baker

8 September 1971 2nd round	Colchester United	4–1	Swindon Town	Colchester
	Lewis 7', 52' (pen.), 70'; Mahon 60'	Report; Report	Horsfield	Stadium: Layer Road; Attendance: 7,437; Referee: Ron Challis

5 October 1971 3rd round	Blackpool	4–0	Colchester United	Blackpool
	Suddick 47'; Green 63'; Burns 68', 82'	Report		Stadium: Bloomfield Road; Attendance: 11,042

=== FA Cup ===
20 November 1971 1st round	Colchester United	1–4	Shrewsbury Town	Colchester
	Hall 41'	Report	Wood 10'; Andrews 24', 67', 83'	Stadium: Layer Road; Attendance: 5,773; Referee: R Toseland

== Squad statistics ==
=== Appearances and goals ===
No.	Pos	Nat	Player	Total		Fourth Division		FA Cup		League Cup		Watney Cup	
No.	Pos	Nat	Player	Apps	Goals	Apps	Goals	Apps	Goals	Apps	Goals	Apps	Goals
	GK	(England) ENG	Barry Smith	31	0	31	0	0	0	0	0	0	0
	DF	(England) ENG	Richard Bourne	2	0	1+1	0	0	0	0	0	0	0
	DF	(England) ENG	Eric Burgess	47	8	41	8	0	0	3	0	3	0
	DF	(England) ENG	Micky Cook	40	1	36+2	1	1	0	1	0	0	0
	DF	(England) ENG	Brian Hall	41	4	36+2	3	1	1	1+1	0	0	0
	DF	(England) ENG	John McLaughlin	9	0	8+1	0	0	0	0	0	0	0
	DF	(England) ENG	Lindsay Smith	18	3	14+4	3	0	0	0	0	0	0
	MF	(England) ENG	Phil Bloss	22	1	19	1	0	0	2	0	1	0
	MF	(England) ENG	Steve Foley	17	4	17	4	0	0	0	0	0	0
	MF	(England) ENG	Steve Leslie	45	13	40+1	13	0+1	0	1+1	0	0+1	0
	MF	(England) ENG	Bobby Mills	3	0	3	0	0	0	0	0	0	0
	MF	(England) ENG	Tony Wingate	1	0	0+1	0	0	0	0	0	0	0
	FW	(England) ENG	Brian Gibbs	40	5	30+3	4	1	0	3	0	3	1
	FW	(England) ENG	Mick Mahon	49	12	41+1	8	1	0	3	2	3	2
	FW	(England) ENG	Dave Simmons	28	4	20+3	3	0	0	2	0	3	1
Players who appeared for Colchester who left during the season
	GK	(England) ENG	Graham Smith	22	0	15	0	1	0	3	0	3	0
	DF	(England) ENG	Bobby Cram	42	0	35+1	0	1	0	2	0	3	0
	DF	(England) ENG	Brian Garvey	39	1	31+1	1	1	0	2+1	0	3	0
	DF	(Scotland) SCO	John Gilchrist	19	0	13	0	1	0	2	0	3	0
	DF	(Scotland) SCO	John Kurila	11	2	9	2	1	0	1	0	0	0
	DF	(England) ENG	Charlie Woods	3	0	3	0	0	0	0	0	0	0
	MF	(England) ENG	David Burnside	13	0	13	0	0	0	0	0	0	0
	MF	(England) ENG	Ken Jones	21	2	13+4	2	1	0	1	0	1+1	0
	MF	(England) ENG	Brian Lewis	37	23	30	15	1	0	3	5	3	3
	FW	(England) ENG	Ray Crawford	1	0	0	0	0	0	0	0	1	0
	FW	(England) ENG	Brian Owen	13	0	7	0	0	0	3	0	3	0

=== Goalscorers ===
Place	Nationality	Position	Name	Fourth Division	FA Cup	League Cup	Watney Cup	Total
1	(England)	MF	Brian Lewis	15	0	5	3	23
2	(England)	MF	Steve Leslie	13	0	0	0	13
3	(England)	WG	Mick Mahon	8	0	2	2	12
4	(England)	FB	Eric Burgess	8	0	0	0	8
5	(England)	FW	Brian Gibbs	4	0	0	1	5
6	(England)	MF	Steve Foley	4	0	0	0	4
6	(England)	FB	Brian Hall	3	1	0	0	4
6	(England)	FW	Dave Simmons	3	0	0	1	4
9	(England)	CB	Lindsay Smith	3	0	0	0	3
10	(England)	MF	Ken Jones	2	0	0	0	2
10	(Scotland)	CB	John Kurila	2	0	0	0	2
12	(England)	MF	Phil Bloss	1	0	0	0	1
12	(England)	FB	Micky Cook	1	0	0	0	1
12	(England)	CB	Brian Garvey	1	0	0	0	1
			Own goals	2	0	0	0	2
			TOTALS	70	1	7	7	85

=== Disciplinary record ===
Nationality	Position	Name	Fourth Division		FA Cup		League Cup		Watney Cup		Total	
Nationality	Position	Name	Booked	Sent off (straight red)	Booked	Sent off (straight red)	Booked	Sent off (straight red)	Booked	Sent off (straight red)	Booked	Sent off (straight red)
(England)	FW	Brian Gibbs	3	0	0	0	0	0	0	0	3	0
(England)	FB	Micky Cook	1	0	1	0	0	0	0	0	2	0
(England)	CB	Brian Garvey	2	0	0	0	0	0	0	0	2	0
(England)	MF	Brian Lewis	2	0	0	0	0	0	0	0	2	0
(Scotland)	FB	John Gilchrist	1	0	0	0	0	0	0	0	1	0
(England)	MF	Ken Jones	1	0	0	0	0	0	0	0	1	0
(Scotland)	CB	John Kurila	1	0	0	0	0	0	0	0	1	0
(England)	MF	Steve Leslie	1	0	0	0	0	0	0	0	1	0
(England)	WG	Mick Mahon	1	0	0	0	0	0	0	0	1	0
		TOTALS	13	0	1	0	0	0	0	0	14	0

=== Clean sheets ===
Number of games goalkeepers kept a clean sheet.

Place	Nationality	Player	Fourth Division	FA Cup	League Cup	Watney Cup	Total
1	(England)	Barry Smith	7	0	0	0	7
1	(England)	Graham Smith	5	0	0	2	7
		TOTALS	12	0	0	2	14

=== Player debuts ===
Players making their first-team Colchester United debut in a fully competitive match.

Position	Nationality	Player	Date	Opponent	Ground	Notes
GK	(England)	Barry Smith	28 August 1971	Bury	Gigg Lane	
FB	(England)	Charlie Woods	26 November 1971	Exeter City	Layer Road	
MF	(England)	Steve Foley	26 November 1971	Exeter City	Layer Road	
MF	(England)	Bobby Mills	4 March 1972	Brentford	Griffin Park	
MF	(England)	David Burnside	11 March 1972	Aldershot	Layer Road	
FB	(England)	John McLaughlin	18 March 1972	Hartlepool	Victoria Park	
MF	(England)	Tony Wingate	18 March 1972	Hartlepool	Victoria Park	
CB	(England)	Richard Bourne	3 April 1972	Chester	Sealand Road	

== See also ==
- List of Colchester United F.C. seasons
