= List of Colchester United F.C. records and statistics =

Colchester United Football Club is an English football club based in Colchester, Essex. Formed in 1937, the club competed in the Southern Football League from their foundation until 1950, when they were elected to the Football League. The club spent eleven years in the Third Division South and Third Division following the league's reorganisation in 1958, with a best finish of third place in 1957, one point behind rivals Ipswich Town and Torquay United. Colchester suffered their first relegation in 1961 as they finished 23rd in the Third Division, but spent just one season in the Fourth Division as they were promoted in second position, behind Millwall by just one point. This trend of relegation followed by promotion continued over the next few decades, before the club were eventually relegated from the Football League to the Conference in 1990.

Player-manager Roy McDonough guided the club back to the Football League in 1992, winning the non-league double of the Conference title and the FA Trophy. The club then won promotion to the Second Division in 1998 with a 1–0 Third Division play-off final win at Wembley against Torquay United. The club were again earned promotion in the 2005–06 season under the stewardship of Phil Parkinson, gaining the opportunity to play second-tier football for the first time in their history. After two seasons in the Championship, Colchester were relegated back to League One, where they currently play.

This list encompasses all major honours won by Colchester United, the records set by the managers, the players, and the club. The player records section includes details of the club's leading goalscorers and those who have made most appearances in first-team competitions, alongside the record transfer fees paid and received by the club, and the fee progression. Attendance records at Colchester's Layer Road and Colchester Community Stadium are also included in the list.

== Honours ==
Colchester United have won one major honour in the Football League, winning the Third Division play-off final in the 1997–98 season, when they defeated Torquay United 1–0 at Wembley after finishing fourth in the league, one point away from automatic promotion. They have achieved promotion on six other occasions, most recently in 2005–06, when they finished as runners-up in League One to Southend United, thus earning promotion to the Championship for the first time in their history.

Colchester United's honours and achievements include the following:

The Football League

- League One (level 3)
  - Promotion: 2005–06 (Note: Promoted automatically to the Championship by finishing in second place in League One.)
- Fourth Division / Third Division (level 4)
  - Promotion: 1961–62, (Note: Promoted automatically to the Third Division by finishing in second place in the Fourth Division.) 1965–66, (Note: Promoted automatically to the Third Division by finishing in fourth place in the Fourth Division.) 1973–74, (Note: Promoted automatically to the Third Division by finishing in third place in the Fourth Division.) 1976–77, (Note: Promoted automatically to the Third Division by finishing in third place in the Fourth Division.) 1997–98 (Note: Promoted via the play-offs to the Second Division after finishing in fourth place in the Third Division.)

Football Conference

- Conference (level 5)
  - Champions: 1991–92

Southern Football League

- Southern League
  - Champions: 1938–39

Domestic cup competition

- Football League Trophy
  - Finalists: 1996–97
- FA Trophy
  - Winners: 1991–92
- Watney Cup
  - Winners: 1971–72

== Player records ==
=== Appearances ===
- Youngest first-team debut: Lindsay Smith, 16 years 214 days (vs. Grimsby Town, Fourth Division, 20 April 1971)
- Oldest first-team debut: Bob Gregg, 41 years, 272 days (vs. Wisbech Town, Southern League, 3 November 1945)
- Oldest Football League first-team debut: Teddy Sheringham, 41 years, 131 days (vs. Sheffield United, Championship, 11 August 2007)

==== Most appearances ====
Competitive matches only.

#	Name	Years	League (Note: Includes the Southern Football League, the Football League, and the Football Conference.)	FA Cup	League Cup	Other (Note: Includes the Southern League Cup, Southern League Mid-Week section, the Associate Members' Cup/Football League Trophy, the FA Trophy, and the Conference League Cup.)	Total
1	(England) Micky Cook	1969–1984	613	45	37	2	700
2	(Wales) Mike Walker	1973–1983	451	36	34	0	524
3	(England) Tony English	1985–1996	429	30	16	40	517
4	(England) Steve Leslie	1971–1984	432	34	32	2	503
5	(England) Kemal Izzet	2001; 2001–2013	421	20	15	16	473
6	(England) Karl Duguid	1995–2008; 2011–2014	415	24	14	16	471
7	(England) Peter Wright	1952–1964	427	17	8	0	451
8	(Scotland) John Fowler	1955–1966	415	20	7	0	442
9	(England) Percy Ames	1955–1965	397	18	7	0	422
10	(England) Ian Allinson	1975–1983; 1988–1989	347	30	26	3	409

=== Goalscorers ===
- Most goals (league): Martyn King, **131** (1959–1965)
- Most goals (all competitions): Tony Adcock, **149** (1981–1987, 1995–1998)
- Most goals in a season (league): Bobby Hunt, **37** (1961–62)
- Most goals in a season (all competitions): Arthur Pritchard, **44** (1938–38)
- Most goals in a league match scored: Chris Iwelumo (vs. Hull City, 2006), Bobby Hunt (vs. Doncaster Rovers, 1962 & vs. Bradford City, 1961), Martyn King (vs. Bradford City, 1961), **4** goals
- Top scorer with fewest goals in a season^{[B]}: Steve Foley, **7** (1975–76)
- Most hat-tricks: **5**, Arthur Pritchard (18 September 1937 – 1 April 1939), Arthur Turner (9 November 1946 – 10 March 1949), Martyn King (26 September 1959 – 10 November 1962), Tony Adcock (21 January 1983 – 26 September 1995)

==== Overall scorers ====
Players shown in bold are current Colchester United players and statistics will be subject to change.

Last updated 2 June 2011

	Name	Years	League	FA Cup	League Cup	Other^{[A]}	Total
1	(England) Tony Adcock	1981–1987; 1995–1998	126	4	7	12	149
2	(England) Martyn King	1956–1964	132	1	6	1	140
3	(England) Bob Curry	1946–1951	81	10	0	14	105
4	(England) Arthur Turner	1946–1952	89	3	0	6	98
5	(England) Kevin McCurley	1952–1960	91	6	0	0	97
6	(England) Peter Wright	1952–1964	89	2	4	0	95
7	(England) Ian Allinson	1975–1983; 1988–1989	79	6	6	3	94
8	(England) Bobby Hunt	1960–1964	82	5	3	0	90
=9	(England) Vic Keeble	1947–1952	78	1	0	5	84
=9	(England) Ken Plant	1954–1958; 1988-1989	79	2	0	3	84

=== Award winners ===
==== PFA Team of the Year ====
The following players have been included in the PFA Team of the Year while playing for Colchester United:

- (England) Steve Dowman, 1977
- (England) Lindsay Smith, 1977
- (England) Roger Osborne, 1982
- (England) Tony Adcock, 1985
- (Republic of Ireland) Mark Kinsella, 1996
- (England) Neil Danns, 2006
- (England) Greg Halford, 2006

==== Player of the Year and Seasonal Awards ====
The following players have been awarded the official Colchester United Player of the Year. Also included are seasonal top goalscorers and most overall appearances since the Player of the Year award's inception in 1965:

Season	Player of the Year	Top Goalscorer	Most Appearances
1964–65	(England) Percy Ames	(Scotland) Billy Stark 14	(Scotland) Duncan Forbes 51
1965–66	(England) Brian Hall	(England) Reg Stratton 21	(England) Brian Hall 50
1966–67	(Scotland) Duncan Forbes	(England) Reg Stratton 24	(Scotland) Duncan Forbes 50
1967–68	(England) Derek Trevis	(England) Reg Stratton 11	(Scotland) Duncan Forbes 52
1968–69	(England) Brian Hall	(England) Danny Light 14	(England) Brian Hall 50
1969–70	(England) Ken Jones	(England) Ken Jones 16	(England) Brian Hall 49
1970–71	(England) Ray Crawford	(England) Ray Crawford 31	(England) Brian Gibbs 56
1971–72	(England) Micky Cook	(England) Brian Lewis 22	(England) Mick Mahon 49
1972–73	(England) Mick Mahon	(England) Mick Mahon 12	(England) Mick Mahon 48
1973–74	(England) Ray Harford	(England) Bobby Svarc 26	(England) Ray Harford 48
1974–75	(England) John Froggatt	(England) Bobby Svarc 25	(England) Micky Cook 54
1975–76	(England) Lindsay Smith	(England) Steve Leslie 7	(England) Mick Packer 48
1976–77	(England) Steve Dowman	(England) Colin Garwood 24	(England) Micky Cook 55
1977–78	(England) Steve Leslie	(England) Bobby Gough 17	(Wales) Mike Walker 55
1978–79	(England) Steve Wignall	(England) Bobby Gough 22	(Wales) Mike Walker 55
1979–80	(Wales) Mike Walker	(England) Trevor Lee 18	(England) Steve Leslie 54
1980–81	(Wales) Mike Walker	(Scotland) Kevin Bremner 10	(Wales) Mike Walker 52
1981–82	(Scotland) Kevin Bremner	(England) Ian Allinson 26	(Scotland) Kevin Bremner 56
1982–83	(Wales) Mike Walker	(England) Ian Allinson 26	(England) Ian Allinson 54
1983–84	(England) Steve Wignall	(England) Tony Adcock 33	(England) Alec Chamberlain 56
1984–85	(England) Alec Chamberlain	(England) Tony Adcock 28	(England) Alec Chamberlain 54
1985–86	(England) Roger Osborne	(England) Tony Adcock 16	(England) Alec Chamberlain 51
1986–87	(England) Rudi Hedman	(England) Tony Adcock 12	(England) Alec Chamberlain 54
1987–88	(Northern Ireland) Colin Hill	(England) Dale Tempest 14	(England) Richard Wilkins 54
1988–89	(Northern Ireland) Colin Hill	(England) Mario Walsh 15	(Northern Ireland) Colin Hill 52
1989–90	(England) Neale Marmon	(England) Trevor Morgan 12	(England) Scott Daniels 52
1990–91	(England) Scott Barrett	(England) Mario Walsh 18	(England) Scott Barrett 51
1991–92	(England) Nicky Smith	(England) Roy McDonough 29	(England) Scott Barrett 56
1992–93	(England) Paul Roberts	(England) Gary Bennett 10	(England) Paul Roberts 50
1993–94	(Republic of Ireland) Mark Kinsella	(England) Steve Brown 13	(England) Tony English 49
1994–95	(England) Steve Whitton	(England) Steve Whitton 13	(England) Mark Kinsella 50
1995–96	(Republic of Ireland) Mark Kinsella	(England) Tony Adcock 17	(England) Simon Betts 52
1996-–97	(Wales) Chris Fry	(England) Tony Adcock 14	(Republic of Ireland) David Greene 55
1997–98	(England) Richard Wilkins	(England) Mark Sale 8	(England) Carl Emberson 53
1998–99	(Republic of Ireland) David Greene	(England) David Gregory 14	(England) David Gregory 48
1999–00	(Republic of Ireland) David Greene	(England) Steve McGavin 16	(England) David Gregory 49
2000–01	(England) Mick Stockwell	(England) Mick Stockwell 11	(England) Mick Stockwell 52
2001–02	(England) Karl Duguid	(England) Scott McGleish 16	(England) Scott McGleish 52
2002–03	(England) Simon Brown	(England) Joe Keith 9	(England) Kemal Izzet 48
2003–04	(England) Alan White	(England) Scott McGleish 17	(England) Sam Stockley 58
2004–05	(England) Pat Baldwin	(England) Craig Fagan 14	(England) Kevin Watson 53
2005–06	(England) Wayne Brown	(Scotland) Chris Iwelumo 19	(England) Greg Halford 55
2006–07	(England) Jamie Cureton	(England) Jamie Cureton 24	(England) Wayne Brown 48
2007–08	(England) Johnnie Jackson	(Jamaica) Kevin Lisbie 17	(England) Johnnie Jackson 48
2008–09	(England) Dean Hammond	(Republic of Ireland) Mark Yeates 13	(Republic of Ireland) Mark Yeates 50
2009–10	(England) Ben Williams	(Jamaica) Kevin Lisbie 13	(Nigeria) Magnus Okuonghae 49
2010–11	(England) David Perkins	(Republic of Ireland) Dave Mooney 14	(Nigeria) Kayode Odejayi 50
2011–12	(Nigeria) Kayode Odejayi	(England) Anthony Wordsworth 13	(England) Brian Wilson 50

=== Internationals ===
- Most capped player (whilst at club): **7** Chris Coyne, (Australia)
- Most capped player (whole career): **56** Craig Forrest, (Canada)

=== Transfers ===
==== Highest transfer fees paid ====
	Player	From	Fee	Date
1	(England) Steven Gillespie	Cheltenham Town	£400,000	July 2008
2	(Australia) Chris Coyne	Luton Town	£350,000	January 2008
3	(England) Clive Platt	MK Dons	£300,000	July 2007
=4	(England) Dean Hammond	Brighton & Hove Albion	£250,000	January 2008
=4	(Republic of Ireland) Mark Yeates	Tottenham Hotspur	£250,000	July 2007
6	(France) Joël Thomas	Hamilton Academical	£125,000	July 2009
=7	(England) Simon Hackney	Carlisle United	£100,000	January 2009
=7	(England) Philip Ifil	Tottenham Hotspur	£100,000	January 2008
=7	(England) Matt Lockwood	Nottingham Forest	£100,000	June 2008
=7	(England) Marc Tierney	Shrewsbury Town	£100,000	January 2009

==== Progression of record fee paid ====
Date	Player	Bought from	Fee
August 1937	(Scotland) Alec Cheyne	Chelsea	£3,000
November 1957	(England) John Evans	Liverpool	£4,000
November 1957	(England) Neil Langman	Plymouth Argyle	£6,750
August 1973	(England) Paul Aimson	Bournemouth	£8,000
December 1977	(England) Eddie Rowles	Darlington	£15,000
October 1980	(Scotland) Kevin Bremner	Keith	£25,000
August 1987	(England) Dale Tempest	Lokeren	£40,000
March 1998	(England) Neil Gregory	Ipswich Town	£50,000
July 2007	(Republic of Ireland) Mark Yeates	Tottenham Hotspur	£250,000
July 2007	(England) Clive Platt	MK Dons	£300,000
January 2008	(Australia) Chris Coyne	Luton Town	£350,000
July 2008	(England) Steven Gillespie	Cheltenham Town	£400,000

==== Highest transfer fees received ====
	Player	From	Fee	Date
1	(England) Greg Halford	Reading	£2,500,000	January 2007
2	(Democratic Republic of the Congo) Lomana LuaLua	Newcastle United	£2,250,000	September 2000
=3	(England) Jamie Cureton	Norwich City	£750,000	June 2007
=3	(England) Craig Fagan	Hull City	£750,000	February 2005
5	(Jamaica) Kevin Lisbie	Ipswich Town	£600,000	July 2008
=6	(England) Neil Danns	Birmingham City	£500,000	June 2006
=6	(Cameroon) George Elokobi	Wolverhampton Wanderers	£500,000	January 2008
=8	(England) Wayne Brown	Hull City	£450,000	July 2007
=8	(Republic of Ireland) Mark Yeates	Middlesbrough	£450,000	July 2009
10	(England) Dean Hammond	Southampton	£400,000	August 2009

==== Progression of record fee received ====
Date	Player	Bought from	Fee
October 1937	(Scotland) Reg Smith	Wolverhampton Wanderers	£500
January 1952	(England) Vic Keeble	Newcastle United	£15,000
February 1964	(England) Bob Hunt	Northampton Town	£20,000
November 1973	(England) John McLaughlin	Swindon Town	£25,000
April 1980	(England) Steve Dowman	Wrexham	£75,000
January 1981	(England) Trevor Lee	Gillingham	£90,000
December 1988	(England) Rudi Hedman	Crystal Palace	£100,000
February 1989	(Republic of Ireland) Paul McGee	Wimbledon	£150,000
September 1996	(Republic of Ireland) Mark Kinsella	Charlton Athletic	£300,000
September 2000	(Democratic Republic of the Congo) Lomana LuaLua	Newcastle United	£2,250,000
January 2007	(England) Greg Halford	Reading	£2,500,000

== Managers ==
The following list indicates Colchester United managers since 1937:

Years with Club	Name	P	W	D	L	GF	GA	GD	Win %	Notes
1937–1939	(England) Ted Davis	128	80	17	31	327	155	+172	62.5%	Colchester United's first ever manager
1945–1946	(England) Syd Fieldus	30	10	7	13	49	69	-20	33.3%	
1946–1948	(England) Ted Fenton	88	48	17	23	214	135	+79	54.5%	
1948–1953	(England) Jimmy Allen	249	108	59	82	433	380	+53	43.4%	
1953–1955	(England) Jack Butler	77	16	19	42	85	138	-53	20.8%	
1955–1963	(England) Benny Fenton	427	166	107	154	736	733	+3	38.9%	
1963–1968	(England) Neil Franklin	234	72	62	100	313	383	-70	30.8%	
1968–1972	(England) Dick Graham	216	93	51	72	322	288	+34	43.1%	
1972	(Scotland) Dennis Mochan	5	0	2	3	2	8	-6	0.0%	Caretaker manager
1972–1975	(England) Jim Smith	140	55	36	49	198	167	+31	39.3%	
1975–1982	(Scotland) Bobby Roberts	375	143	108	124	504	451	+53	38.1%	
1982–1983	(Northern Ireland) Allan Hunter	36	17	7	12	51	39	+12	47.2%	
1983–1986	(Wales) Cyril Lea	173	71	46	56	294	243	+51	41.0%	
1986–1987	(Wales) Mike Walker	83	37	16	30	120	102	+18	44.6%	
1987–1988	(England) Roger Brown	48	16	12	20	46	68	-22	33.3%	
1988–1989 1989–1990	(England) Steve Foley	21	7	5	9	33	34	-1	33.3%	Caretaker manager
1989	(Scotland) Jock Wallace	52	12	16	24	63	87	-24	23.1%	
1990	(England) Mick Mills	25	8	3	14	27	37	-10	32.0%	
1990–1991	(England) Ian Atkins	51	30	11	10	80	46	+34	58.8%	
1991–1994	(England) Roy McDonough	155	69	33	53	271	226	+45	44.5%	
1994	(Scotland) George Burley	26	12	6	8	41	38	+3	46.2%	
1994–1995	(England) Dale Roberts	5	1	1	3	5	7	-2	20.0%	Caretaker manager
1995–1999	(England) Steve Wignall	218	81	64	73	289	283	+6	37.2%	
1999	(England) Mick Wadsworth	24	7	7	10	28	41	-13	29.2%	
1999–2003	(England) Steve Whitton	181	52	45	84	224	290	-66	28.7%	Includes time as caretaker
2003–2006	(England) Phil Parkinson	187	80	52	55	256	203	+53	42.8%	
2006–2008	(Wales) Geraint Williams	109	33	30	46	150	165	-15	30.3%	Includes time as caretaker
2008	(Wales) Kit Symons	5	2	0	3	8	9	-1	40.0%	Caretaker manager
2008–2009	(Scotland) Paul Lambert	42	19	7	16	55	43	+12	45.2%	
2009–2010	(England) Aidy Boothroyd	44	19	12	13	56	52	+4	43.2%	
2010–2012	(England) John Ward	102	33	35	34	134	148	–14	32.4%	
2009, 2012-2014	(Republic of Ireland) Joe Dunne	49	17	11	21	85	106	−21	34.6%	Includes time as caretaker
2014-2015	Tony Humes	67	22	15	30	101	126	−25	32.8%	
2015	Richard Hall	1	0	0	1	1	5	−4	0.0%	Caretaker manager
2015, 2021, 2022	Wayne Brown	46	14	12	20	50	63	-13	30.4%	Includes time as caretaker
2015-2016	Kevin Keen	24	5	7	12	21	40	−19	20.8%	
2016	David Wright	1	0	1	0	2	2	0	0.0%	Caretaker manager
2016, 2020-2021, 2022	Steve Ball	36	8	13	15	41	49	-8	22.2%	Includes time as caretaker
2016-2020	John McGreal	202	76	55	71	289	264	25	37.6%	
2021-2022	Hayden Mullins	40	11	11	18	36	50	-14	27.5%	Includes time as caretaker
2022-2023	Matt Bloomfield	28	9	6	13	28	31	−3	32.1%	
2023	Ross Embleton	2	0	0	2	0	3	−3	0.0%	Caretaker manager
2023	Ben Garner	24	6	6	12	31	36	−5	25.0%	
2023-2024	Matthew Etherington	15	5	1	9	18	29	-11	33.3%	Includes time as caretaker
2024-	Danny Cowley									

== Team records ==
=== Matches ===
- First competitive match: Yeovil & Petters United 3–0 Colchester United, Southern League, 28 August 1937
- First FA Cup match: Colchester United 4–1 Ilford, FA Cup 4th Qualifying Round, 12 November 1938
- First Football League match: Gillingham 0–0 Colchester United, Third Division South, 19 August 1950
- First League Cup match: Colchester United 4–1 Newcastle United, League Cup 1st Round, 10 October 1960

=== Record wins ===
- Record league win: Colchester United 9–1 Bradford City, Fourth Division, 30 December 1961
- Record cup win: Colchester United 9–1 Leamington, FA Cup 1st Round, 5 November 2005
- Record home win: Colchester United 9–1 Bradford City, Fourth Division, 30 December 1961
- Record away win: Norwich City 1–7 Colchester United, League One, 8 August 2009

=== Record defeats ===
- Record league defeat: Leyton Orient 8–0 Colchester United, Fourth Division, 15 October 1988
- Record cup defeat: Preston North End 7–0 Colchester United, FA Cup 3rd Round, 2 January 2010
- Record home defeat:

Colchester United 0–5 Luton Town, Division Two, 21 April 2003
Colchester United 0–5 Norwich City, League One, 16 January 2010
Colchester United 1–6 Stevenage F.C, League One, 26 December 2011

- Record away defeat: Leyton Orient 8–0 Colchester United, Fourth Division, 15 October 1988

=== Sequences ===
==== Full league sequence ====
- Longest winning streak: 7 matches

29 November 1968 – 1 February 1969
31 December 2005 – 7 February 2006

- Longest drawing streak: 6 matches, 21 March 1977 – 11 April 1977
- Longest losing streak: 9 matches

21 November 2012 – 12 January 2013
31 October 2015 – 28 December 2015

- Longest clean sheet streak: 8 matches, 7 March 1992 – 22 April 1992
- Longest streak failing to score: 5 matches

7 April 1981 – 25 April 1981
21 April 2003 – 15 August 2003
11 February 2006 – 11 March 2006

- Longest streak without a win: 20 matches, 2 March 1968 – 31 August 1968
- Longest streak without a draw: 24 matches, 16 October 1976 – 19 March 1977
- Longest streak without a loss: 20 matches, 22 December 1956 – 19 April 1957
- Longest streak without a clean sheet: 38 matches, 1 September 2007 – 29 March 2008
- Longest streak without failing to score: 26 matches, 30 April 1991 – 1 January 1992

==== Home league sequences ====
- Longest winning streak: 17 matches, 12 October 1991 – 15 August 1992
- Longest drawing streak: 5 matches

26 December 1977 – 25 February 1978
15 April 1978 – 2 September 1978
13 March 2012 – 14 April 2012

- Longest losing streak: 6 matches, 13 October 1989 – 16 December 1989
- Longest clean sheet streak: 9 matches, 1 January 1992 – 20 April 1992
- Longest streak failing to score: 4 matches, 14 March 2009 – 25 April 2009
- Longest streak without a win: 11 matches, 2 March 1968 – 31 August 1968
- Longest streak without a draw: 27 matches, 26 September 1989 – 3 November 1990
- Longest streak without a loss: 27 matches, 14 April 1956 – 2 September 1957
- Longest streak without a clean sheet: 23 matches, 9 April 2007 – 18 March 2008
- Longest streak without failing to score: 33 matches, 21 April 1984 – 18 October 1985

==== Away league sequences ====
- Longest winning streak: 5 matches

11 October 1981 – 28 November 1981
3 October 1987 – 6 November 1987
26 December 2022 – 11 February 2023 (Gillingham, Harrogate Town, Rochdale, Hartlepool, Grimsby)

- Longest drawing streak: 5 matches, 21 March 1977 – 22 April 1977
- Longest losing streak: 12 matches, 12 March 1960 – 15 October 1960
- Longest clean sheet streak: 4 matches, 27 March 1978 – 24 April 1978
- Longest streak failing to score: 7 matches

28 February 1978 – 22 April 1978
12 March 1988 – 2 September 1988
22 November 2003 – 13 March 2004

- Longest streak without a win: 19 matches

13 September 1950 – 21 April 1951
26 December 1959 – 29 October 1960

- Longest streak without a draw: 17 matches, 21 February 1959 – 6 October 1959
- Longest streak without a loss: 11 matches, 24 August 1991 – 14 December 1991
- Longest streak without a clean sheet: 33 matches, 19 September 2007 – 12 January 2009
- Longest streak without failing to score: 16 matches, 18 August 1962 – 27 March 1963

== Footnotes ==
A. The "Other" column constitutes goals and appearances (including those as a substitute) in the Football League Trophy or Associate Members Cup, FA Trophy, Conference League Cup, Southern League Cup and Watney Cup.
B. Does not include football played during war years (1939–40 to 1945–46).
