= Binks =

Binks is an English surname which may refer to:

- Alfred Binks (1873–1953), Australian politician
- Arthur Binks (1902–1969), English rugby league footballer
- C. J. Binks (1931–2026), Tasmanian educator and writer
- Eddie Binks (1887–1963), British trade unionist and politician
- Fred Binks (1899–unknown), English footballer
- George Binks (1914–2010), American baseball outfielder
- Jimmy Binks (born 1935), English cricketer
- Kenneth Binks (1925–2018), Canadian lawyer and politician
- Les Binks (1951–2025), Northern Irish heavy metal drummer
- Louis Binks (1898–1969), English footballer
- Luis Binks (born 2001), English footballer
- Martin Binks (born 1953), English footballer
- Reuben Ward Binks (1880–1950), English artist
- Sid Binks (1899–1978), English footballer
- Simon Binks (born 1956), Australian rock musician

Fictional characters

- Jar Jar Binks, a Gungan in the Star Wars saga
- Sarah Binks, subject of an eponymous novel (1947) by Paul Hiebert

Businesses and Organizations

Binks, based in Shoreview, Minnesota, is a leading American manufacturer of fluid-handling solutions used by customers around the world.
