= Des Kelly (disambiguation) =

Des Kelly is a British journalist.

Des or Desmond Kelly may also refer to:

- Des Kelly (footballer)
- Desmond Kelly, Ceylonese musician
- Desmond Kelly (New Zealand actor)
- Des Kelly (racing driver) in 1966 Gallaher 500
- Desmond Kelly (dancer), British ballet dancer
