= John South =

John South may refer to:

- John South (footballer, born 1952) (1952–2004), English footballer for Colchester United
- John South (footballer, born 1948), English footballer for Brentford
- John Flint South (1797–1882), English surgeon
- John Glover South, American physician and diplomat
