= Penhalonga =

Mining town in Manicaland, Zimbabwe

Coordinates: 18°53′S 32°41′E

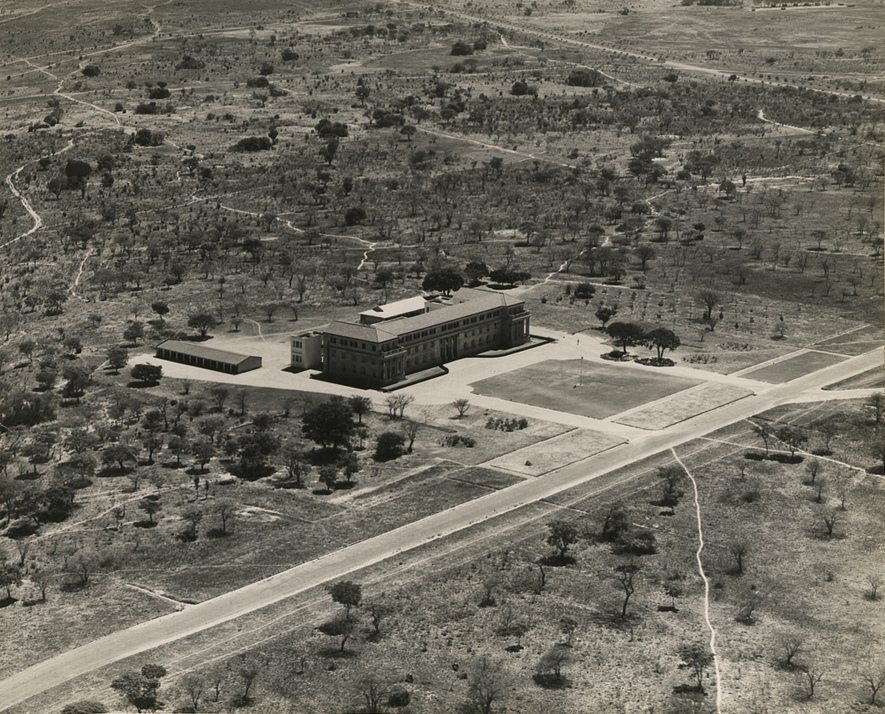
St Augustine's Mission in Penhalonga, c. 1932

Penhalonga is a mining village in Mutasa District of Manicaland Province, Zimbabwe, located 18 km north of Mutare in a valley where the Tsambe and Imbeza Rivers meet the Mutare River. According to the 1982 Population Census, the village had a population of 4,477. Ancient gold workings have been found in the area. In 1895 the Penhalonga Mine opened and the village grew around the gold mine. The name is derived from the shona word Panoronga meaning "the place that shines". The origin is often confused with the Portuguese words "Penha" which means "rocky mountain" and "longa" meaning long. While the old Penhalonga mine closed in 1943, a new mine, the Rezende Mine, opened in 1999. Bauxite clay, which is also mined in the area, supplies most of Zimbabwe's pottery industry. The village is the residential and commercial centre for the mine and the surrounding area of forestry, dairy and mixed farming.

Hugh Tracey recorded the Teacher Training College choir at St. Augustine's Church in Penhalonga for a Columbia record issued in 1955.

== People ==
Writer Charles Mungoshi was educated at St. Augustine's in Penhalonga.

British ballet dancer Desmond Kelly was born in Penhalonga in 1942.

Tom Wigglesworth, abducted on his farm near Penhalonga in 1978, was the author of Perhaps Tomorrow, a book about his experiences as a captive of the forces of Robert Mugabe. David Caute called the book "a remarkable testimony" in the London Review of Books.
