= Barry Smith (footballer, born 1953) =

English footballer

Personal information
- Full name: Barry Anthony Smith
- Date of birth: 3 March 1953 (age 73)
- Place of birth: Colchester, England
- Height: 5 ft 11 in (1.80 m)
- Position: Goalkeeper

Youth career
- Colchester United

Senior career*
Years	Team	Apps	(Gls)
1971–1973	Colchester United	49	(0)
1973	Walsall	0	(0)
1973	Sunderland	0	(0)
- Weymouth
- Clacton Town
Total		49	(0)
- * Club domestic league appearances and goals

Barry Anthony Smith (born 3 March 1953) is an English former footballer who played as a goalkeeper in the Football League for Colchester United. He was also briefly on the books at Walsall and Sunderland but failed to make an appearance for either team.

== Career ==
Born in Colchester, Smith came through the youth ranks at hometown club Colchester United, signing a professional contract in July 1971. He made his debut aged 18 on 28 August 1971 in a 3–0 defeat at Bury in the Fourth Division but it wasn't until usual keeper Graham Smith was sold to West Bromwich Albion in October of the same year that Smith became a regular fixture in the U's starting line-up. He played in all the remaining games of the 1971–72 season and featured regularly at the beginning of the 1972–73 season. In Jim Smith's first game as manager in October 1972, it was found Barry had been playing with a broken wrist, leaving him out of action until the New Year. As cover, Jim Smith signed John McInally from Lincoln City, as Barry only went on to make one more start for the club, a 4–1 defeat to Hereford United on 17 February 1973. This was to be his last match in a Colchester shirt. In all, Smith made 49 appearances for Colchester between 1971 and 1973.

In 1973, Smith had short spells with both Walsall and Sunderland but failed to make an appearance for either club, eventually joining non-league Weymouth in November of the same year. He later played for ex-U's player Roy Massey's Clacton Town as an outfield player. Following the end of his footballing career, Smith became an insurance agent in Colchester.

With the death of Colchester United legend and Former Players Association chairman Peter Wright in 2012, Smith was appointed chairman at a Former Players Association dinner in April 2013.
