= Desmond Kelly (dancer) =

English ballet dancer

Desmond Kelly OBE
- Born: January 13, 1942 (age 84); Penhalonga, Southern Rhodesia (now Zimbabwe)
- Education: Ruth French School of Dance
- Occupations: Ballet dancer; ballet master; artistic director
- Years active: 1959–present
- Spouse: Denise Le Comte
- Career
- Former groups: London Festival Ballet; Royal Ballet; Sadler's Wells Royal Ballet; New Zealand Ballet; National Ballet of Washington, D.C.
- Dances: Giselle (Albrecht)

Desmond Kelly (born 13 January 1942) is an English ballet dancer born in Penhalonga, Southern Rhodesia who held positions in several international dance companies.

== Career ==
Kelly studied under Ruth French in London.

Kelly danced with the London Festival Ballet from 1959 to 1966. He became assistant principal in 1963. He was a dancer with the Zurich Ballet from 1966 to 1967.

He was ballet master and principal dancer for the New Zealand Ballet from 1967 to 1968.

He danced with the National Ballet of Washington, D.C. from 1968 to 1970. He went to the Royal Ballet in 1970 as a principal, staying until 1976. At the Royal Ballet he created roles in Glen Tetley's Field Figures (1970), Jack Carter's Shukumei, and Kenneth MacMillan's Playground (1979). He was often partnered with Margot Fonteyn.

Kelly was at Sadler's Wells Royal Ballet from 1976 to 1978, where he became ballet master and then assistant director, while continuing to perform some character roles.

He was made an Officer of the Most Excellent Order of the British Empire in 2005.

He became the artistic director of the Elmhurst Ballet School in 2008.

== Critical reaction ==
According to the Oxford Dictionary of Dance he was considered "not a virtuoso," but "a fine partner and actor" during his time at the Royal Ballet and was "a renowned Albrecht" in Giselle.

In 1978, he performed as Albrecht in Giselle with the Eglevsky Ballet at Hofstra University on Long Island. Critic Anna Kisselgoff wrote in the New York Times that "His Albrecht had a strong dramatic presence, with careful nuances in tone" and he was "a fine partner." She added that, "Although his last solo showed him to be less than the perfect classical dancer, his characterization gave a production that stressed drama over dancing the weight it needed."

== Personal life ==
He married New Zealand ballet dancer Denise Le Comte.
