= Louis Binks =

English footballer

Personal information
- Full name: Louis Binks
- Date of birth: 23 October 1898
- Place of birth: Sheffield, England
- Date of death: 1969 (aged 70–71)
- Height: 5 ft 11 in (1.80 m)
- Position: Full-back

Senior career*
Years	Team	Apps	(Gls)
1918–1919	Tinsley Amateurs		
1919–1921	Coventry City	15	(0)
1922–1923	Grimsby Town	3	(0)
1923–192?	Rotherham Town		
- * Club domestic league appearances and goals

Louis Binks (23 October 1898 – 1969) was an English professional footballer who played as a full-back.
