= Jimmy Thompson (footballer, born 1943) =

English footballer (1943–2020)

Personal information
- Full name: James Butters Thompson
- Date of birth: 7 January 1943
- Place of birth: Felling, Tyne and Wear, England
- Date of death: 28 October 2020 (aged 77)
- Place of death: Grimsby, North East Lincolnshire, England
- Position: Full-back

Senior career*
Years	Team	Apps	(Gls)
1961	St Mary's Boys Club		
1961–1967	Grimsby Town	156	(2)
1967–1969	Port Elizabeth City		
1969–1973	Cambridge United	118	(0)
- * Club domestic league appearances and goals

James Butters Thompson (7 January 1943 – 28 October 2020) was an English professional footballer who played as a full-back.

On 28 October 2020, Thompson died after suffering from dementia.
