= Dick Habbin =

English footballer and manager

Personal information
- Full name: Richard Leonard Habbin
- Date of birth: 6 January 1949 (age 77)
- Place of birth: Cambridge, England
- Position: Striker

Senior career*
Years	Team	Apps	(Gls)
?–1969	Cambridge United	?	(?)
1969–1975	Reading	219	(42)
1975–1977	Rotherham United	84	(19)
1977–1979	Doncaster Rovers	60	(12)
1979–?	Maltby Miners Welfare	?	(?)

Managerial career
- 1979–?: Maltby Miners Welfare
- * Club domestic league appearances and goals

Richard Leonard Habbin (born 6 January 1949 in Cambridge, England) is an English former footballer and manager.

== Career ==
Habbin joined Reading in March 1969 from non-league side Cambridge United. He joined Rotherham United in January 1975 after making 219 appearances and scoring 24 goals in the Football League for Reading. He made 84 appearances and scored 19 goals in the league for them before joining Doncaster Rovers in September 1977. He made 60 appearances and scored 12 goals in the league for them before being released at the end of the 1978–79 season.

He became player-manager of Maltby Miners Welfare in 1979.
