= Bobby Noble (footballer, born 1949) =

English footballer

Personal information
- Full name: Robert Noble
- Date of birth: 25 May 1949
- Place of birth: Gosforth, England
- Date of death: 15 May 2005
- Height: 5 ft 11 in (1.80 m)
- Position: Central defender

Youth career
- Newcastle United

Senior career*
Years	Team	Apps	(Gls)
1967–1970	Newcastle United	0	(0)
1969–1970	→ Barrow (loan)	19	(3)
1970	Bury	6	(0)
1970–1972	Barrow	73	(5)
1972–1973	Colchester United	27	(0)
1973–1975	Southport	63	(6)
1975–1977	Darlington	53	(3)
1977–1978	Western Suburbs	32	(2)
- Inter Monaro
- * Club domestic league appearances and goals as of 02:45, 16 May 2011

Robert Noble (25 May 1949 – 15 May 2005) was an English professional footballer. He started his career as a central defender for Newcastle United (although he made no senior appearances), going on loan to Barrow before moving on to Bury, then returned to Barrow on a permanent deal. This was followed by moves to Colchester United, Southport and Darlington. Noble then moved to Australia, playing for Western Suburbs in New South Wales and Inter Monaro.
