= Steve Wooldridge =

English footballer (born 1950)

Personal information
- Full name: Stephen Joseph Wooldridge
- Date of birth: 18 July 1950 (age 76)
- Place of birth: Chiswick, London, England
- Height: 5 ft 8 1/2 in (1.74 m)
- Position: Full-back

Youth career
- 1967–1970: Crystal Palace

Senior career*
Years	Team	Apps	(Gls)
1970–1972	Crystal Palace	0	(0)
1970–1971	→ Plymouth Argyle (loan)	20	(0)
1972	Colchester United	3	(0)
1972	→ Folkestone (loan)		
- Folkestone
Total		23	(0)
- * Club domestic league appearances and goals

Stephen Joseph "Steve" Wooldridge (born 18 July 1950) is an English former footballer who played as a full-back in the Football League for Plymouth Argyle on loan from Crystal Palace, and Colchester United.

== Career ==
Born in Chiswick, London, Wooldridge signed professional terms at Selhurst Park in July 1967 but failed to progress to the first-team. He was loaned out to Plymouth Argyle in the 1970–71 season where he made 20 Football League appearances.

Wooldridge was brought to Colchester United by manager Dick Graham in the summer of 1972, but after making his debut on the opening day of the season in a 1–0 win against Hereford United, he featured on just two further occasions for the club following the resignation of manager Graham. He made his final appearance for the club on 20 September 1972 in a 1–0 away defeat at Southport before being loaned out to Folkestone in November, signing permanently just before Christmas.
