= Des Kelly (footballer) =

Irish footballer (born 1950)

Personal information
- Full name: Desmond Charles James Jude Kelly
- Date of birth: 1 November 1950 (age 75)
- Place of birth: Limerick, Ireland
- Position: Goalkeeper

Senior career*
Years	Team	Apps	(Gls)
- Limerick
1970–1972	Norwich City	0	(0)
1972	Colchester United	1	(0)
- Lowestoft Town
Total		1	(0)
- * Club domestic league appearances and goals

Desmond Charles James Jude Kelly (born 1 November 1950) is an Irish former footballer who played in the Football League as a goalkeeper for Colchester United, making one professional appearance in his career.

== Football career ==
Born in Limerick to an Irish father and an English mother, Kelly studied at Limerick CBS, cousin to former Norwich City and Republic of Ireland footballer Phil Kelly. Des Kelly joined hometown club Limerick following youth spells with Hyde Rovers, Fairview and Drogheda United, before joining his cousin Phil's former club Norwich in 1970, where he had spent time on trial. He joined Southend United on trial in October 1971 whilst with Norwich, but never made a first-team appearance for the club. Following his release from Norwich, Kelly joined Colchester United on trial.

Kelly signed for Colchester in June 1972 and would go on to make a single Football League appearance for the club. The club's manager at the time was Jim Smith, who had been watching Kelly during a reserve-team game and discovered from the club doctor that Kelly was blind in one eye. An injury to U's first-choice keeper Barry Smith allowed Kelly an opportunity into the first-team. His only league game for Colchester came in a 3–0 away defeat to Bradford City on 4 November 1972. He would only play once more for Colchester in an FA Cup first round 6–0 win against Bognor Regis Town on 18 November.

Following his release from Colchester, Kelly joined another of his cousin's former clubs, Lowestoft Town. He coached football at St Benedict's Catholic College in Colchester.

== Teaching career ==
Kelly trained to be a teacher at St Mary's College, Twickenham. His first and only teaching job was at St John Payne Catholic Comprehensive School in Chelmsford. He was approached by the school to build up its fledgling sports programmes and spent 34 years as head of physical education, including 20 as deputy head teacher. In addition to PE, he also taught religious education.

== Personal life ==
Kelly is a devout Catholic. After retiring in 2010, he was awarded the Pro Ecclesia et Pontifice by Pope Benedict XVI for his work in Catholic Education, evangelisation and bereavement in the Roman Catholic Diocese of Brentwood.

Kelly and his wife Linda have two sons and they continue to reside in Chelmsford. One of their sons is also a teacher at St John Payne Catholic School.
