= Dennis Oakes =

English cricketer and footballer

Denis Oakes
Personal information
- Date of birth: 10 April 1946 (age 80)
- Place of birth: Bedworth, Warwickshire, England
- Position: Defender

Senior career*
Years	Team	Apps	(Gls)
1964–1967	Coventry City	0	(0)
1967–1971	Notts County	120	(0)
1971–1973	Peterborough United	85	(5)
- Chelmsford City
- * Club domestic league appearances and goals

Denis Oakes
Cricket information
- Batting: Right-handed
- Bowling: Leg break

Domestic team information
- Years: Team
- 1965: Warwickshire

Career statistics
Competition	First-class
Matches	5
Runs scored	81
Batting average	11.57
100s/50s	–/–
Top score	33
Balls bowled	7
Wickets	–
Bowling average	–
5 wickets in innings	–
10 wickets in match	–
Best bowling	–
Catches/stumpings	7/–
- Source: Cricinfo, 22 December 2011

Dennis Raymond Oakes (born 10 April 1946) is an English former cricketer and footballer. In cricket, Oakes was a right-handed batsman who bowled leg break. He was born at Bedworth, Warwickshire.

Oakes made his first-class debut for Warwickshire against Northamptonshire in the 1965 County Championship. He made four further first-class appearances in that season, the last of which came against Essex. In his five first-class matches, he scored a total of 81 runs at an average of 11.57, with a high score of 33.

He also played football for Coventry City, Notts County, Peterborough United and Chelmsford City, making 205 appearances in the Football League as a central defender.
