= Angus Davidson =

Scottish footballer

Personal information
- Full name: Angus Gordon Davidson
- Date of birth: 2 October 1948
- Place of birth: Forfar, Scotland
- Height: 5 ft 7 in (1.70 m)
- Position: Midfielder

Youth career
- 1964–1965: Arbroath Lads Club

Senior career*
| Years | Team | Apps | (Gls) |
| 1965–1969 | Grimsby Town | 51 | (1) |
| 1969–1977 | Scunthorpe United | 321 | (44) |
| 1977–19?? | Winterton Rangers | | |
- * Club domestic league appearances and goals

Angus Gordon Davidson (born 2 October 1948) is a Scottish former professional footballer who played as a midfielder.
