= Archie Irvine =

Scottish footballer

Personal information
- Full name: Archibald Irvine
- Date of birth: 25 June 1946
- Place of birth: Coatbridge, Scotland
- Date of death: 6 September 2020 (aged 74)
- Height: 5 ft 5 in (1.65 m)
- Position: Midfielder

Youth career
- Armadale Thistle

Senior career*
Years	Team	Apps	(Gls)
1965–1968	Airdrieonians	28	(0)
1968–1969	Sheffield Wednesday	29	(1)
1969–1975	Doncaster Rovers	228	(16)
1975–1976	Scunthorpe United	23	(1)
Total		308	(18)
- * Club domestic league appearances and goals

Archie Irvine (25 June 1946 - 6 September 2020) was a Scottish footballer, who played for Airdrie, Sheffield Wednesday, Doncaster Rovers and Scunthorpe United.
