= Fred Binks =

English footballer

Personal information
- Full name: George Frederick Binks
- Date of birth: January 1899
- Place of birth: Handsworth, England
- Position: Wing-half

Senior career*
Years	Team	Apps	(Gls)
1921–1922	Birmingham	0	(0)
1922–1927	Walsall	107	(1)
Total		107	(1)
- * Club domestic league appearances and goals

George Frederick Binks (January 1899–unknown) was an English footballer who played in the Football League for Walsall.
