= Bobby Moss =

English footballer

Personal information
- Date of birth: 13 February 1952
- Place of birth: Chigwell, England
- Date of death: 1 August 2010 (aged 58)
- Place of death: Romford, England
- Position: Forward

Senior career*
Years	Team	Apps	(Gls)
1970–1972	Orient	5	(1)
1972–1973	Colchester United	17	(3)
1973	Folkestone	?	(?)
1973	Dover	?	(?)
1973	Wimbledon	2	(1)
1973–1974	Barnet	?	(2)
1974–1980	Wealdstone	?	(?)
1980–1984	Chelmsford City	128	(16)
- * Club domestic league appearances and goals

Robert Moss (13 February 1952 – 1 August 2010) born in Chigwell, Essex, was an English professional footballer who played in the Football League, as a forward.
