= John South (footballer, born 1952) =

English footballer

Personal information
- Full name: John Alan South
- Date of birth: 30 November 1952
- Place of birth: Bow, London, England
- Date of death: 21 December 2004 (aged 52)
- Place of death: Riogordo, Málaga, Spain
- Height: 6 ft 4 in (1.93 m)
- Position: Midfielder

Youth career
- Leyton Orient

Senior career*
Years	Team	Apps	(Gls)
1972	Colchester United	4	(0)
Total		4	(0)
- * Club domestic league appearances and goals

John Alan South (30 November 1952 – 21 December 2004) was an English footballer who played as a center back in the Football League for Colchester United. He died in Spain in 2004 at the age of 52, after living there for two years with his wife, Georgina, and their young son George.

== Career ==
Born in Bow, London, South began his career at Leyton Orient but failed to break into the first team, joining Dick Graham at Colchester United on a three-month trial. He made his debut on 26 August 1972 in a 3–1 defeat to Newport County at Layer Road. He made just four league appearances for Colchester during which Graham resigned. He played his final professional game in a 3–2 home defeat to Aldershot on 9 October before injuring his cartilage that forced him to retire from professional football. However, once recovered from the injury, South returned to football by joining non-league side Molins FC.
