= Richard Bourne (footballer) =

English footballer

Personal information
- Full name: Richard Adrian Bourne
- Date of birth: 9 December 1954 (age 71)
- Place of birth: Colchester, England
- Position: Central defender

Youth career
- Colchester United

Senior career*
Years	Team	Apps	(Gls)
1971–1973	Colchester United	4	(0)
1973–1976	Ramsgate	122	(17)
1976–1979	Bath City	144	(29)
1979–1982	Torquay United	68	(7)
1982–1988	Weymouth	324	(34)
- * Club domestic league appearances and goals

Richard Adrian Bourne (born 9 December 1954) is an English former professional footballer. He played as a central defender.

Bourne joined Colchester United as a junior, making his league debut in the 1971–72 season. He eventually signed professional in April 1973, but failed to make any further league appearances for the Layer Road side after that season. He subsequently played for Ramsgate before joining Bath City.

He was playing for Bath City in June 1979 (having joined them at least prior to April 1976 when he joined Torquay United. He lasted 3 seasons at Plainmoor, scoring 7 times in 68 league games before leaving for non-league Weymouth. He had a benefit match at Weymouth in 1989.
