= Colin Hill (footballer) =

Northern Irish footballer

Personal information
- Full name: Colin Frederick Hill
- Date of birth: 12 November 1963 (age 62)
- Place of birth: Uxbridge, Middlesex, England
- Positions: Centre-back; right-back

Youth career
- Hillingdon Borough
- 1977–1981: Arsenal

Senior career*
Years	Team	Apps	(Gls)
1981–1986	Arsenal	46	(1)
1986	→ Brighton & Hove Albion (loan)	0	(0)
1986–1987	Marítimo	30	(8)
1987–1989	Colchester United	69	(0)
1989–1992	Sheffield United	82	(1)
1992–1997	Leicester City	145	(0)
1997	Trelleborg	11	(0)
1997–1999	Northampton Town	54	(0)
Total		437	(10)

International career
1990–1998	Northern Ireland	27	(1)
- * Club domestic league appearances and goals

Colin Frederick Hill (born 12 November 1963) is a Northern Irish former professional footballer who played as a centre-back and right-back.

He notably played top flight football for Arsenal, Sheffield United and Leicester City, where he saw time in the Premier League with the latter. He also played in the top divisions of Portugal and Sweden for both Marítimo and Trelleborg as well as in the Football League for Brighton & Hove Albion, Colchester United and Northampton Town. He was capped 27 times by Northern Ireland, scoring one goal.

He is now a commercial director for the Professional Footballers' Association.

== Career ==
Hill played as a youth for Hillingdon Borough before joining Arsenal on schoolboy forms in 1977, becoming an apprentice in 1980 and turning professional in 1981. Initially a striker, he was converted into a defender and made his debut against Norwich City on 20 April 1983. He made 7 appearances in total that season, and went on to play 37 league games in 1983–84, mostly at right-back, but the signing of Viv Anderson forced him out of the first team and he spent most of the next two seasons in the reserves.

Hill left Arsenal for Portuguese side Marítimo in July 1986 on a free transfer, having played 51 games and scoring one goal for Arsenal. He later had spells with Colchester United, Sheffield United (winning them promotion to the First Division in 1989–90), Leicester City (winning promotion to the Premier League in 1995–96, although he missed out on the 1997 League Cup Final), Trelleborg and Northampton Town. He also won 27 caps for Northern Ireland.

== Personal life ==
After retiring Colin spent ten years working in the Commercial and Hospitality sector for Leicester City FC, The Q Group and the THA Group.

Colin is now a Commercial Executive for The PFA.

== Honours ==
Sheffield United

- Football League Second Division runner-up: 1989–90

Leicester City

- Football League First Division play-offs: 1996
