= John McInally (footballer, born 1951) =

Scottish footballer

Personal information
- Full name: John Stewart McInally
- Date of birth: 26 September 1951
- Place of birth: Gatehouse of Fleet, Scotland
- Date of death: 5 June 2012 (aged 60)
- Place of death: Gatehouse of Fleet, Scotland
- Position: Goalkeeper

Youth career
- Manchester United

Senior career*
Years	Team	Apps	(Gls)
1970–1972	Lincoln City	22	(0)
1972	→ Colchester United (loan)	1	(0)
1972–1973	Colchester United	26	(0)
- Braintree Town
Total		49	(0)

Managerial career
- Braintree & Crittall Athletic
- * Club domestic league appearances and goals

John Stewart McInally (26 September 1951 – 5 June 2012) was a Scottish footballer who played in the English Football League as a goalkeeper for Lincoln City and Colchester United. He began his career with Manchester United but failed to break into the first team.

== Career ==
McInally, born in Gatehouse of Fleet, began his career with Manchester United, but failed to make a first-team appearance for the club. In 1970, he signed for Lincoln City, making his debut on 19 December in a 2–1 away defeat to Brentford in the Fourth Division. McInally made 22 Football League appearances for the Imps, making his final appearance on 29 April 1972 in a 4–0 win at home to Chester.

In November 1972, McInally signed for Colchester United on loan from Lincoln, making one appearance in a 3–1 win against Southport on 10 November before being signed permanently, making his second and full-time debut on 25 November in a 1–0 win against Reading at Elm Park. He made 27 league appearances for the U's and made his final appearance on 30 April 1973 in a 4–0 win at Layer Road against Gillingham.

McInally left Colchester in the summer of 1973 joining Braintree & Crittall Athletic, where he went on to become player-manager.

McInally died in his native Gatehouse of Fleet in 2012 at the age of 60.
