= Martin Binks =

English footballer

Personal information
- Full name: Martin John Binks
- Date of birth: 15 September 1953 (age 73)
- Place of birth: Romford, England
- Position: Defender

Youth career
- Leyton Orient

Senior career*
Years	Team	Apps	(Gls)
1972	Colchester United	10	(0)
1973	Cambridge United	1	(0)
	Dartford	65	(3)
Total		76	(3)
- * Club domestic league appearances and goals

Martin John Binks (born 15 September 1953) is an English former footballer who played as a defender in the Football League for Colchester United and Cambridge United.

== Career ==
Born in Romford, Binks began his career with Leyton Orient, but failed to make a first team appearance for the club. He moved to Colchester United in 1972, where he made ten league appearances.

He made his league debut on 19 August 1972 in a 2–1 defeat to Hartlepool United. Coincidentally, his final appearance for the club came in the reverse fixture, a 1–1 draw at Layer Road with Hartlepool.

Following his exit from Colchester, Binks joined up with Cambridge United in 1973, making one appearance before moving to Dartford.
