= Ken Jones (footballer, born 1941) =

English footballer

Personal information
- Full name: Kenneth Brian Jones
- Date of birth: 9 February 1941 (age 85)
- Place of birth: Keighley, England
- Position: Midfielder

Senior career*
Years	Team	Apps	(Gls)
1960–1964	Southend United	87	(34)
1964–1969	Millwall	178	(11)
1969–1972	Colchester United	77	(23)
1972–?	Margate	?	
- * Club domestic league appearances and goals

Kenneth Brian Jones (born 9 February 1941) is an English former professional footballer who played primarily as a midfielder

== Career ==
Born in Keighley, Jones began his career with Southend United, where he scored 34 times in 87 appearances. He moved to Millwall in 1964, where he made 178 appearances, registering 11 league goals. He moved on to Colchester United in 1969, with a record of 23 goals in 77 league games, before moving into non-league football to play for Margate.

== Honours ==
=== Club ===
Millwall

- Football League Third Division Runner-up (1): 1965–66
- Football League Fourth Division Runner-up (1): 1964–65
