= John McLaughlin (footballer, born 1954) =

English footballer

Personal information
- Date of birth: 29 October 1954 (age 72)
- Place of birth: Edmonton, England
- Position: Right back

Youth career
- –: Colchester United

Senior career*
Years	Team	Apps	(Gls)
1971–1973	Colchester United	66	(2)
1973–1979	Swindon Town	202	(8)
1979–1984	Portsmouth	172	(1)
–	Fareham Town	?	(?)
Total		440	(11)

International career
1973	England Youth	6	(0)
- * Club domestic league appearances and goals

John McLaughlin (born 29 October 1954) is an English former professional footballer who played as a right back.

== Career ==
Born in Edmonton, made 440 appearances in the Football League for Colchester United, Swindon Town and Portsmouth, scoring 11 goals.

He later played non-League football for Fareham Town.

== Honours ==
Portsmouth

- Football League Third Division: 1982–83
