= Brian Hall (footballer, born 1939) =

English footballer

Personal information
- Full name: Brian Samuel Hall
- Date of birth: 9 March 1939
- Place of birth: Burbage, England
- Date of death: 2002 (aged 62–63)
- Position: Left back

Senior career*
Years	Team	Apps	(Gls)
?–1958	Belper Town		
1958–1965	Mansfield Town	72	(19)
1965–1973	Colchester United	328	(27)
1973	Chelmsford City	28	(1)
1973–1974	Wimbledon	11	(1)
- * Club domestic league appearances and goals

Brian Samuel Hall (9 March 1939 – September 2002) was an English footballer who played for Mansfield Town and Colchester United between 1958 and 1973.

Hall made 361 appearances and scored 38 goals in eight years with Colchester. Originally an attacking left-side player, he spent much of his career as a left-back known for his dribbling skill when overlapping down the left wing. He was a great crowd favourite and was inducted into the club's Hall of Fame. After football, he ran a local sports shop with Ray Crawford that lasted for only two years. He died in September 2002 at the age of 63.
