= Steve Leslie (footballer, born 1952) =

English footballer

Personal information
- Full name: Steven Robert William Leslie
- Date of birth: 4 September 1952 (age 74)
- Place of birth: Hornsey, London, England
- Position: Midfielder

Senior career*
| Years | Team | Apps | (Gls) |
| 1971–1984 | Colchester United | 434 | (40) |
- Chelmsford City
- Brentwood Town
| 1987–1991 | Wivenhoe Town | 125 | (6) |

International career
| 1971 | England Youth | 3 | (0) |
- * Club domestic league appearances and goals

Steven Robert William Leslie (born 4 September 1952) is an English former professional footballer who played as a midfielder.

== Career ==
Leslie made over 500 appearances in all competitions for Colchester between 1971 and 1984. After leaving Colchester, Leslie played for Chelmsford City, Brentwood Town and Wivenhoe Town. He now works for Brentwood Council.

== Honours ==
=== Individual ===
- Colchester United Player of the Year (1): 1978
