= List of Colchester United F.C. players (1–24 appearances) =

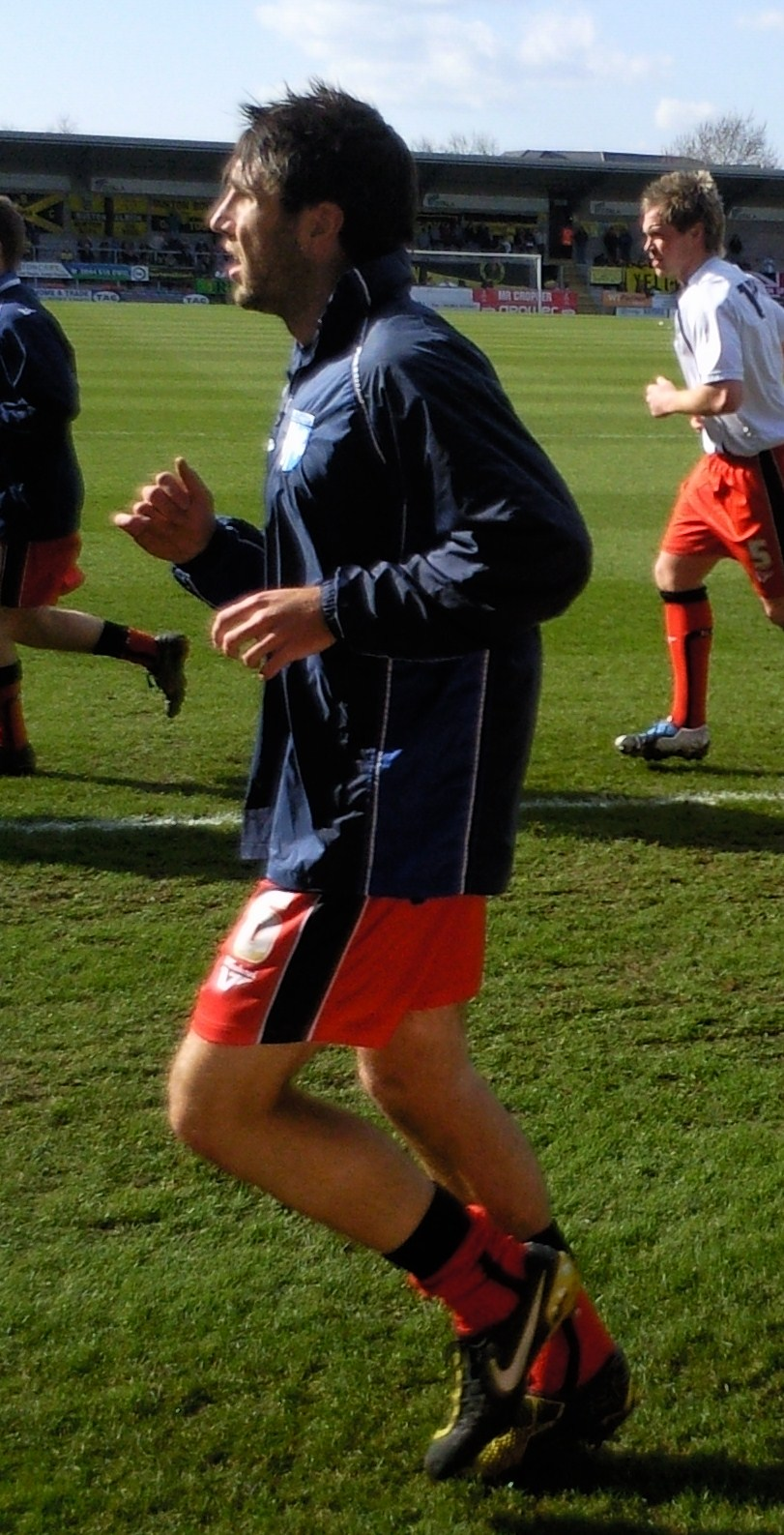
Colchester United youth team product Garry Richards made 24 appearances for the club between 2005 and 2007.

Colchester United Football Club is an English football club based in Colchester, Essex. Formed in 1937, the club competed in the Southern Football League from their foundation until 1950, when they were elected to the Football League. The club spent eleven years in the Third Division South and Third Division following the league's reorganisation in 1958, with a best finish of third place in 1957, one point behind rivals Ipswich Town and Torquay United. Colchester suffered their first relegation in 1961 as they finished 23rd in the Third Division, but spent just one season in the Fourth Division as they were promoted in second position, behind Millwall by just one point. This trend of relegation followed by promotion continued over the next few decades, before the club were eventually relegated from the Football League to the Conference in 1990.

Player-manager Roy McDonough guided the club back to the Football League in 1992, winning the non-league double of the Conference title and the FA Trophy. The club then won promotion to the Second Division in 1998 with a 1–0 Third Division play-off final win at Wembley against Torquay United. The club were again promoted in the 2005–06 season under the stewardship of Phil Parkinson, gaining the opportunity to play second tier football for the first time in their history. After two seasons in the Championship, Colchester were relegated back to League One. Colchester were relegated to the fourth tier for the first time in 18-years at the end of the 2015–16 season.

Colchester United's first team have competed in a number of professional competitions, and all players who have played fewer than 25 of these matches, either as a member of the starting line-up or as a substitute, are listed below. Each player's details include the duration of his Colchester United career, his usual playing position while employed by the club, the number of matches started, the number of substitute appearances and total number of appearances, their total goals scored and total numbers of yellow and red cards collected. The players are sorted by total number of appearances, then by number of starts, then by player name in alphabetical order.

== Introduction ==
Over 400 players made between one and 25 appearances in all competitions during their Colchester United careers. Three players finished their time with the club on exactly 24 appearances, including Warren Aspinall, Elliott Hewitt, Garry Richards and Medy Elito Four of the players featured on this list would either go on to manage the club or were player-manager. These include Alf Miller, Jim Smith, Bobby Roberts and George Burley.

== Key ==
Player

- Players highlighted in yellow are registered Colchester United players for the 2016–17 season.
- Players marked in italics were on loan from another club for the duration of their Colchester United career. The loaning club(s) are noted in the reference column.

Positions key
Pre-1960s		1960s–	
GK	Goalkeeper		
FB	Full back	DF	Defender
HB	Half-back	MF	Midfielder
FW	Forward		
U	Utility player		

Position

- Playing positions are listed according to the tactical formations that were employed at the time. The change in the names of defensive and midfield positions reflects the tactical evolution that occurred from the 1960s onwards.

Club career

- Club career is defined as the first and last calendar years in which the player appeared for the club in any of the competitions listed below.

Total starts, Total subs, Total apps, Total goals, Total yellow cards and Total red cards

- Total starts, total subs and total goals are matches a player has started, been brought on as a substitute and the combined total of these figures, the total number of goals scored, and the total number of yellow and red cards received in the following competitions; Southern League, Southern League Mid-Week Section, Southern League Cup, English Football League (including play-offs), Conference, FA Cup, EFL Cup, Associate Members' Cup/Football League Trophy/EFL Trophy, FA Trophy, Bob Lord Trophy and the Watney Cup.

== Players with one to 24 appearances ==
As of match played 26 November 2021

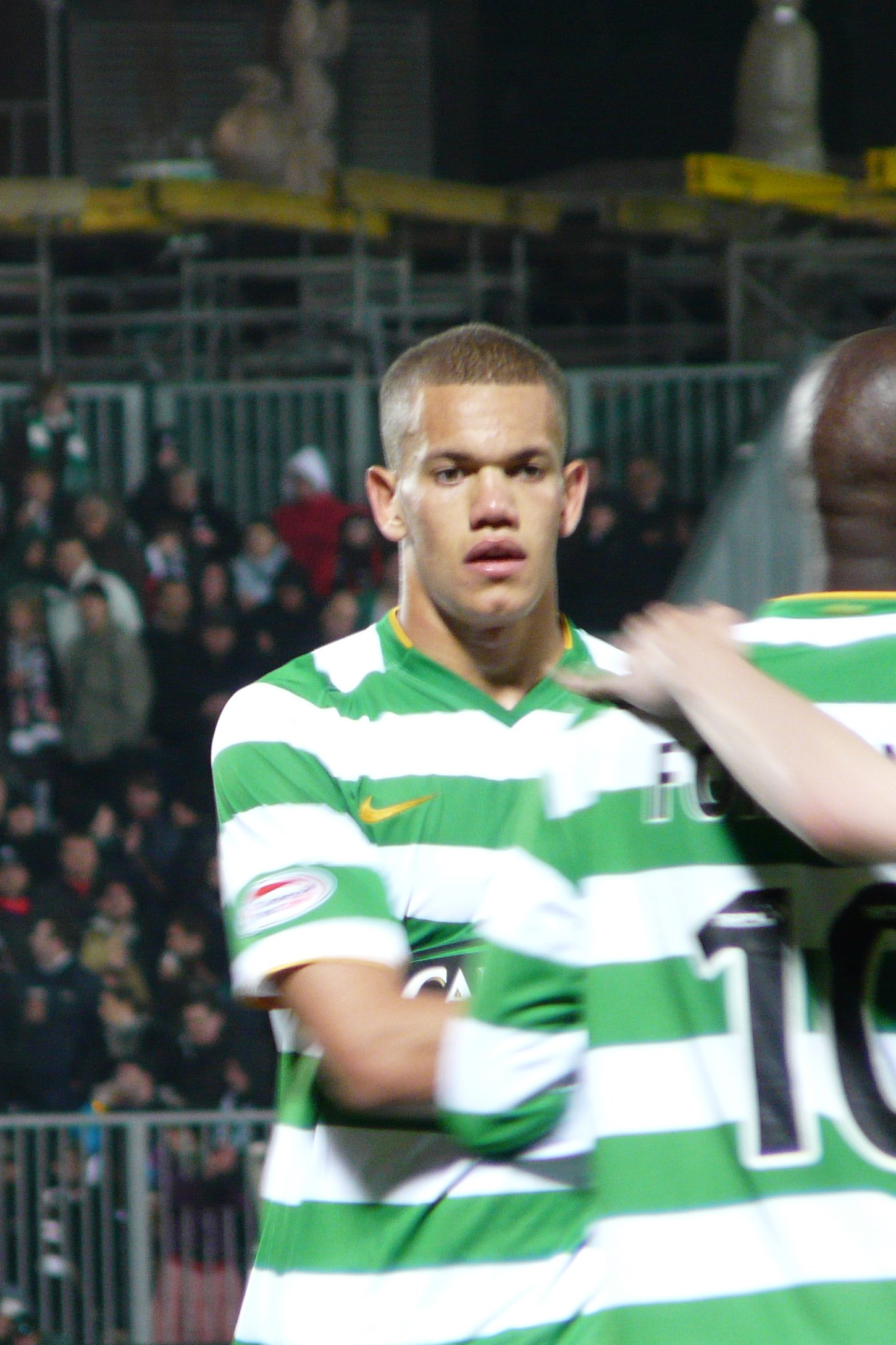
Josh Thompson made just 23 appearances in two spells between 2012 and 2015 in a U's career plagued by injury.

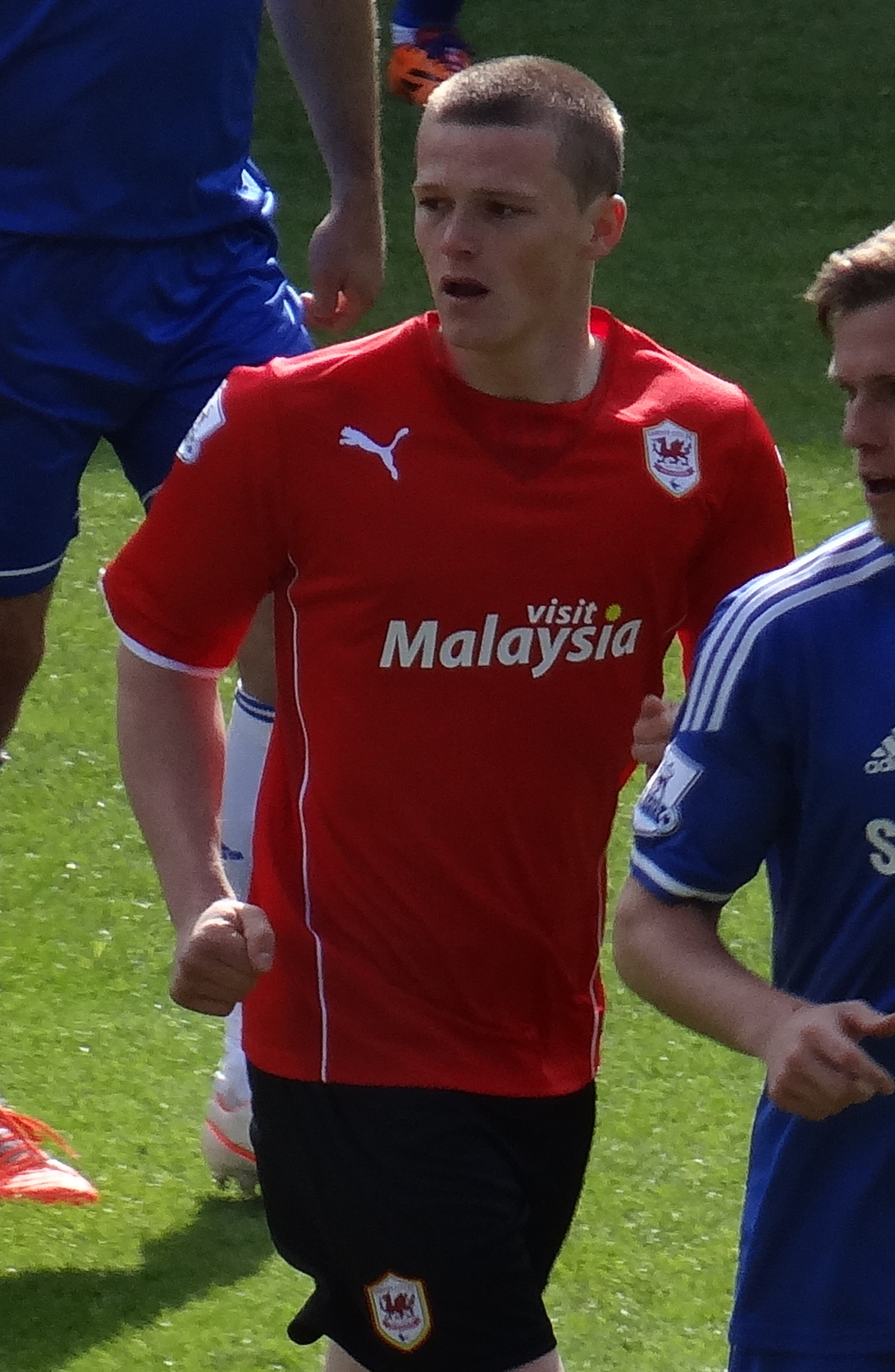
Rhys Healey made 23 appearances in two loan spells from Cardiff City in 2014 and 2015.

Doug Loft was another player to have an injury-ridden stay at Colchester United. The midfielder only managed 22 appearances in two years at the club.

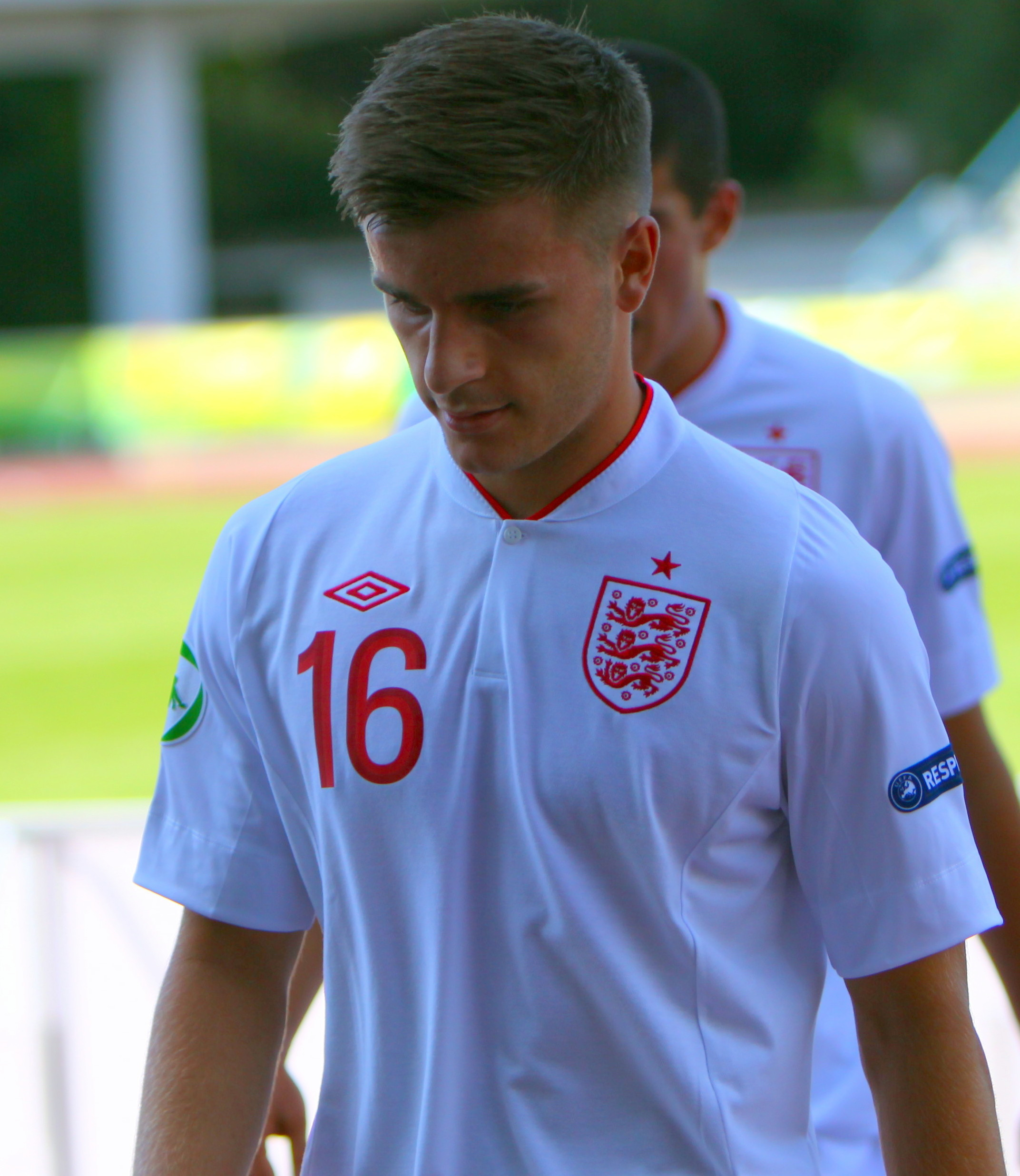
Luke Garbutt made 20 loan appearances from Everton in the 2013–14. He went on to make his Premier League and England under-21 debut later in the season.

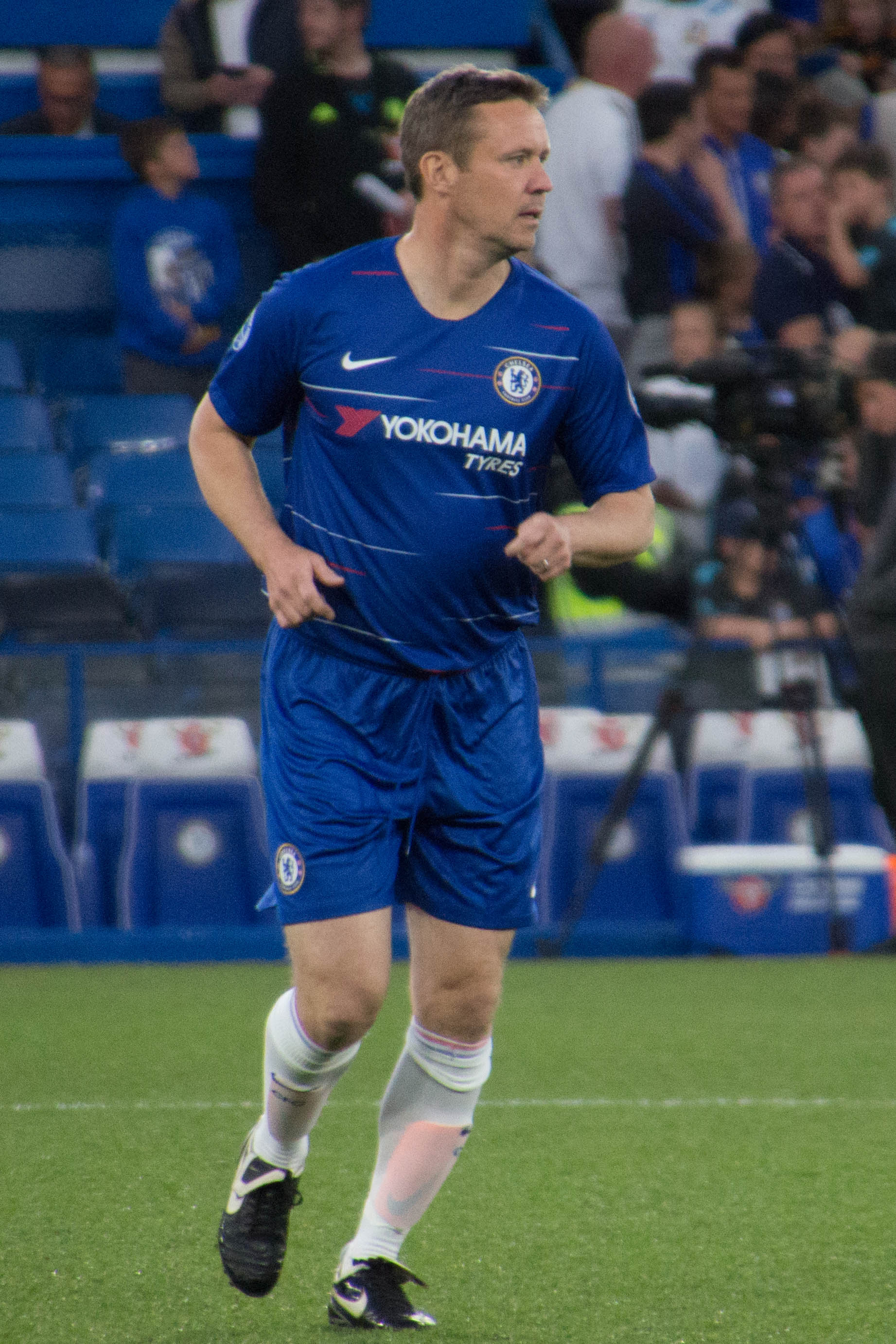
Danny Granville appeared 20 times for Colchester during their ill-fated 2007–08 season in the Championship.

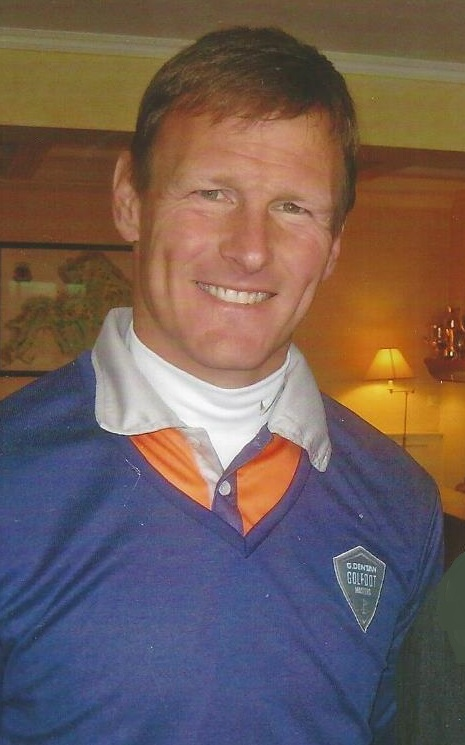
Teddy Sheringham called time on his illustrious career at Colchester, playing 20 games and scoring four goals.

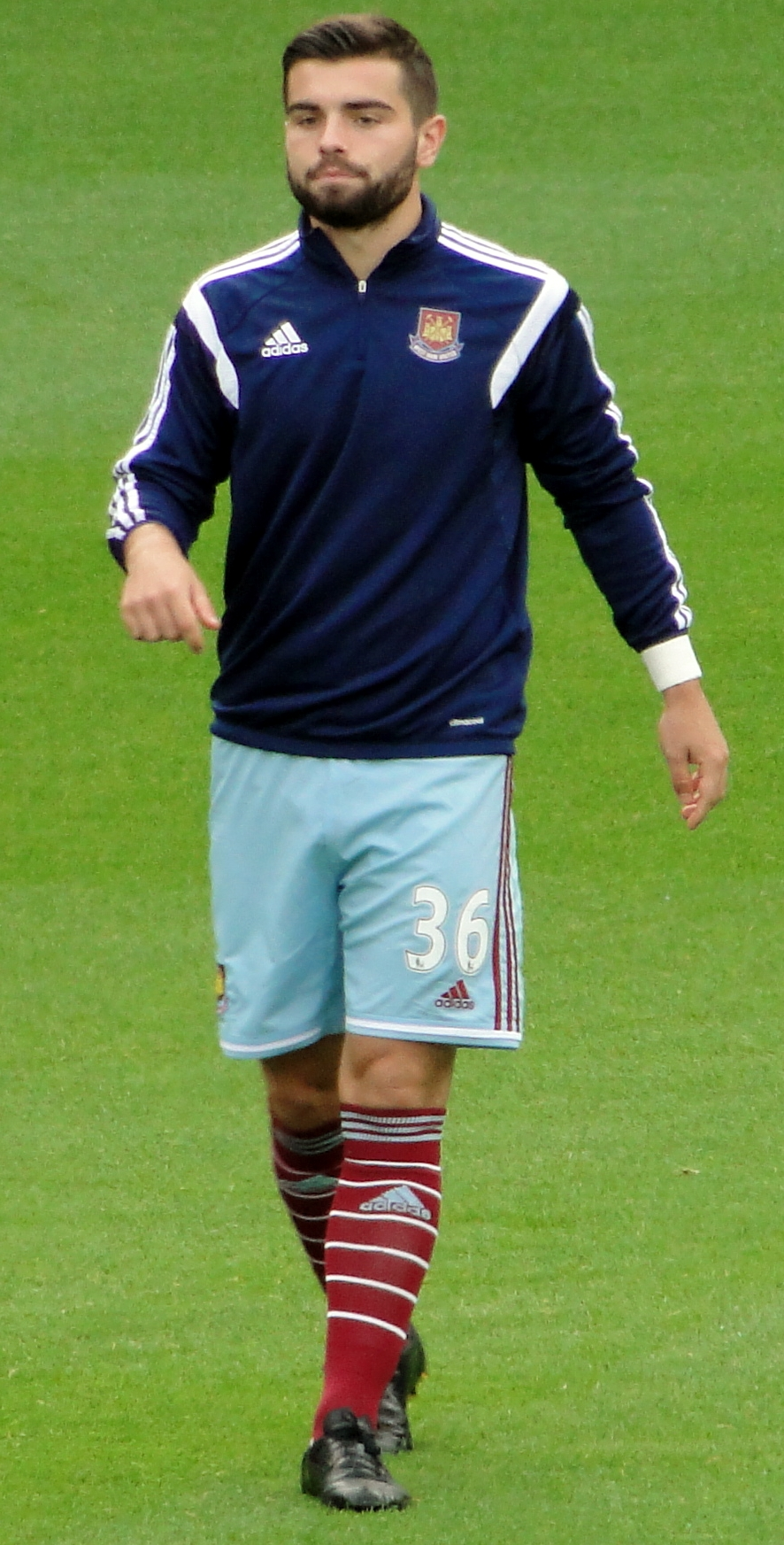
Two-time West Ham United loanee Elliot Lee made 19 Colchester appearances in 2013 and 2016.

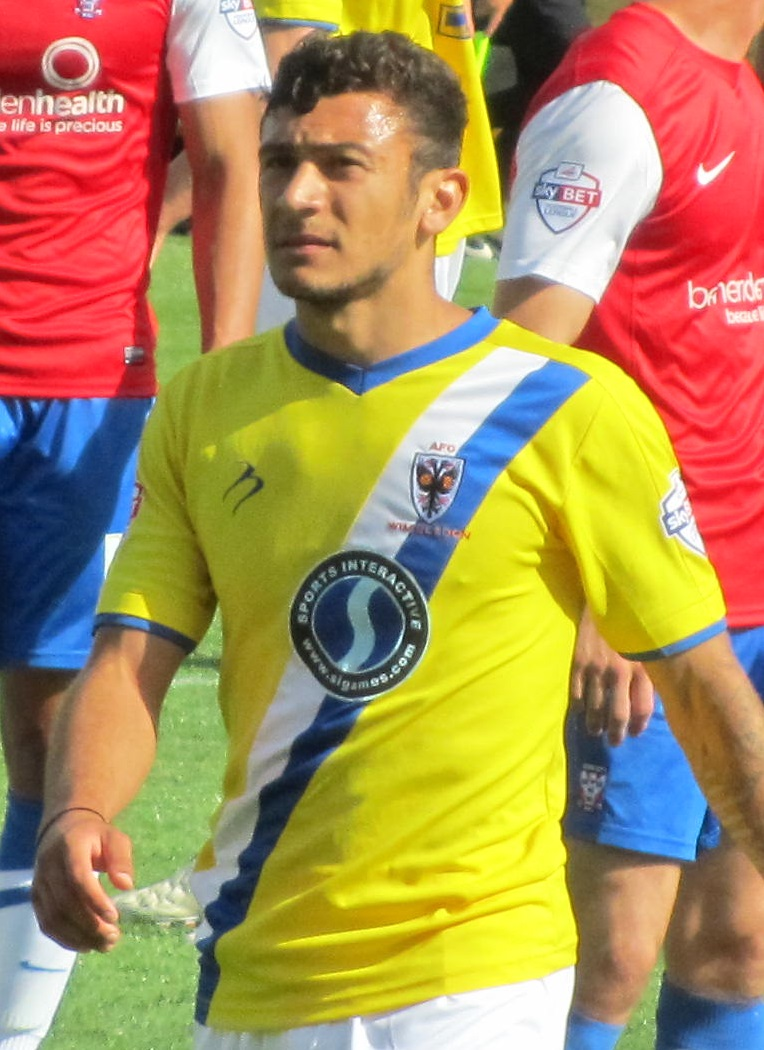
George Porter made 19 appearances on loan from Burnley in 2013.

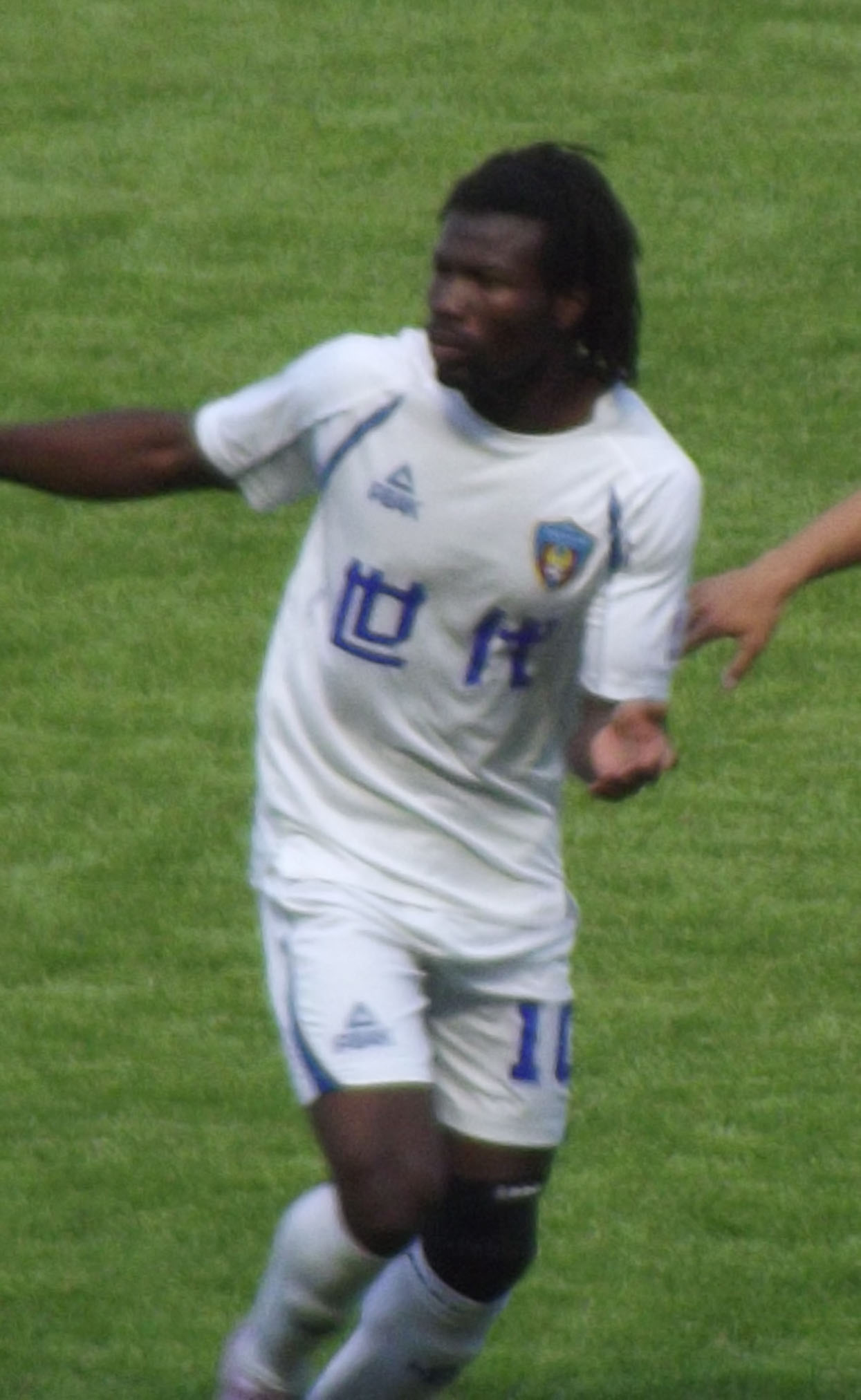
Forward Akanni-Sunday Wasiu managed just two goals in 19 appearances in the 2008–09 season.

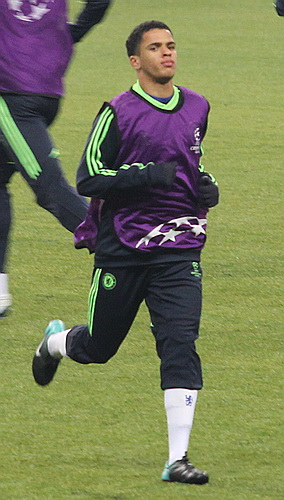
Billy Clifford made his professional debut for Colchester on loan from Chelsea in 2013.

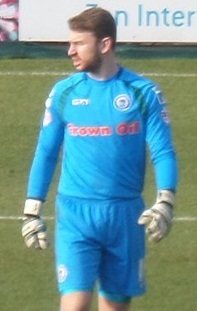
Replacing the injured Sam Walker, goalkeeper Jamie Jones made 18 appearances on loan from Preston North End in 2015.

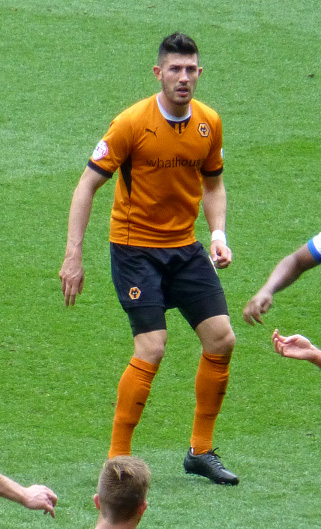
Danny Batth made his professional debut on loan from Wolverhampton Wanderers in 2009–10, making 18 appearances and scoring one goal.

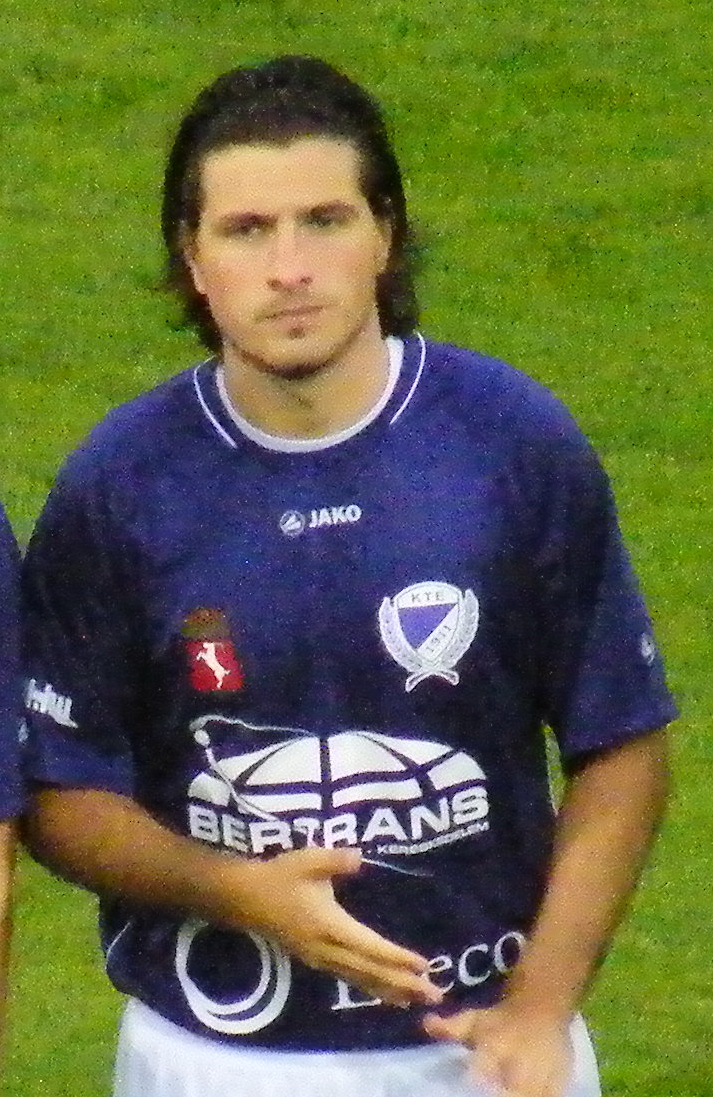
Hungary international Béla Balogh made 17 appearances on loan from MTK Budapest in the 2007–08 season.

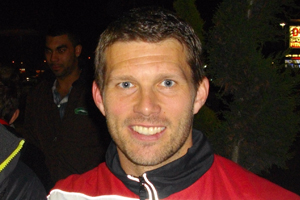
Jimmy Walker played in goal for Colchester on loan from West Ham United making 16 appearances during 2008–09.

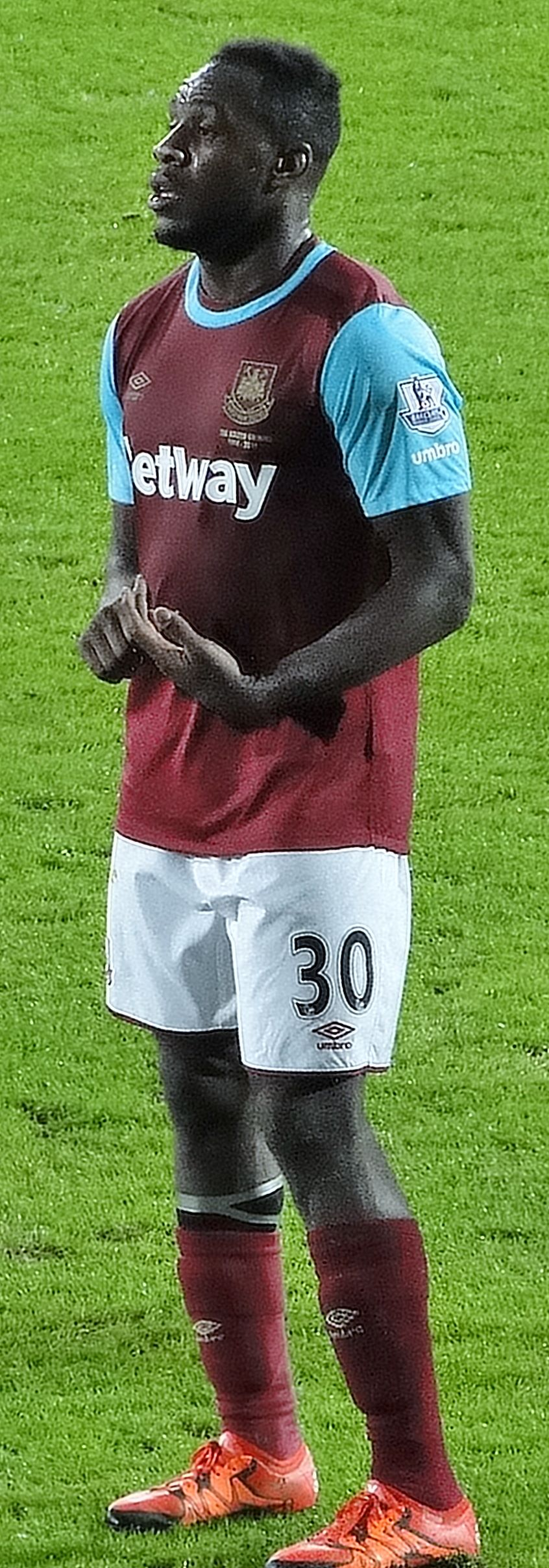
Reading loanee Michail Antonio played 16 games and scored four goals for Colchester in 2011.

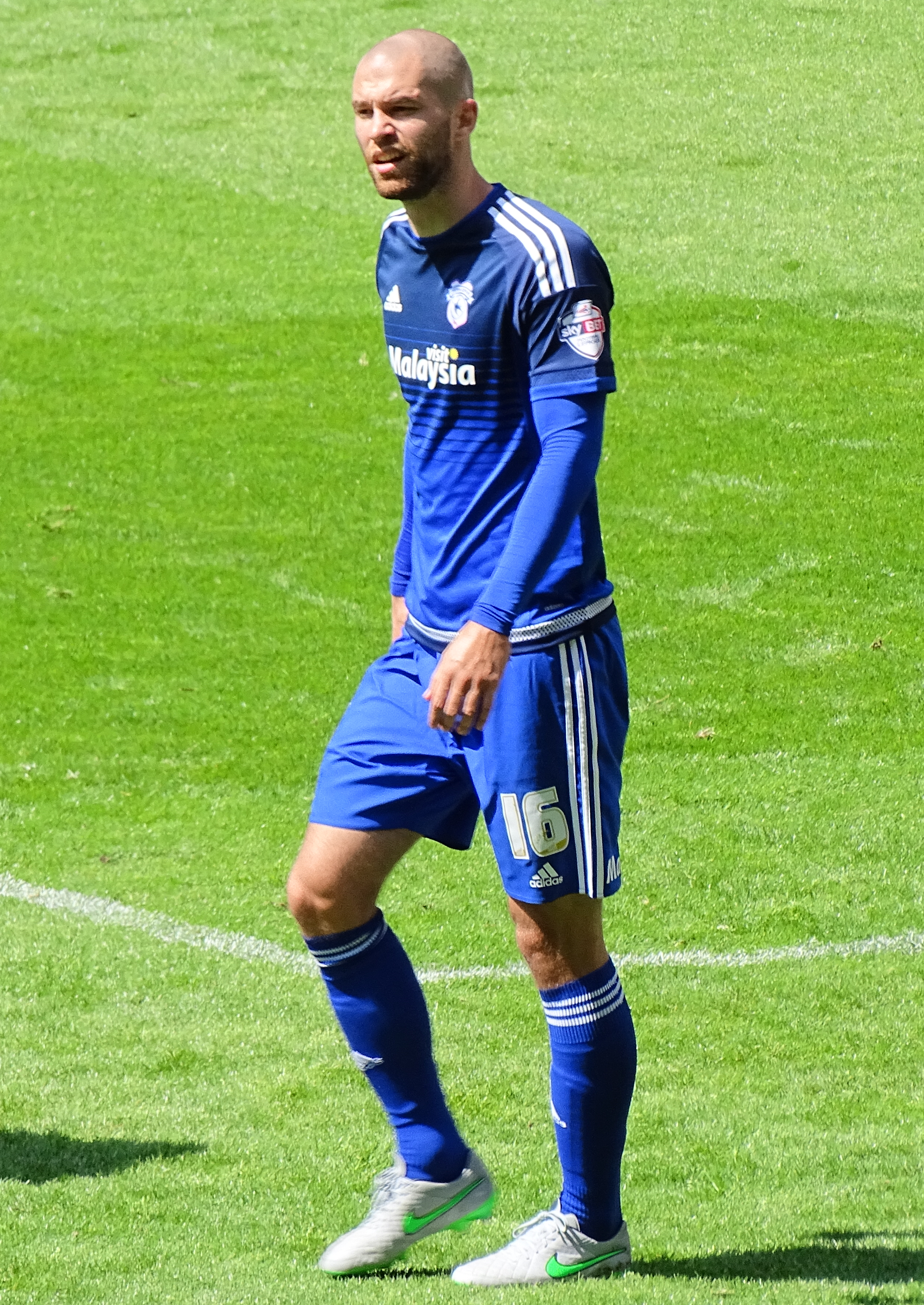
Arsenal loanee Matthew Connolly appeared 16 times for Colchester in 2007, scoring twice.

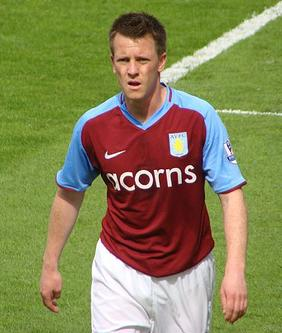
Former England international Nicky Shorey made 15 appearances for Colchester during a short spell in 2016.

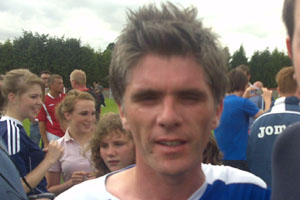
Forward Tony Thorpe played 14 times in Colchester's promotion-winning 2005–06 season, but failed to find the back of the net.

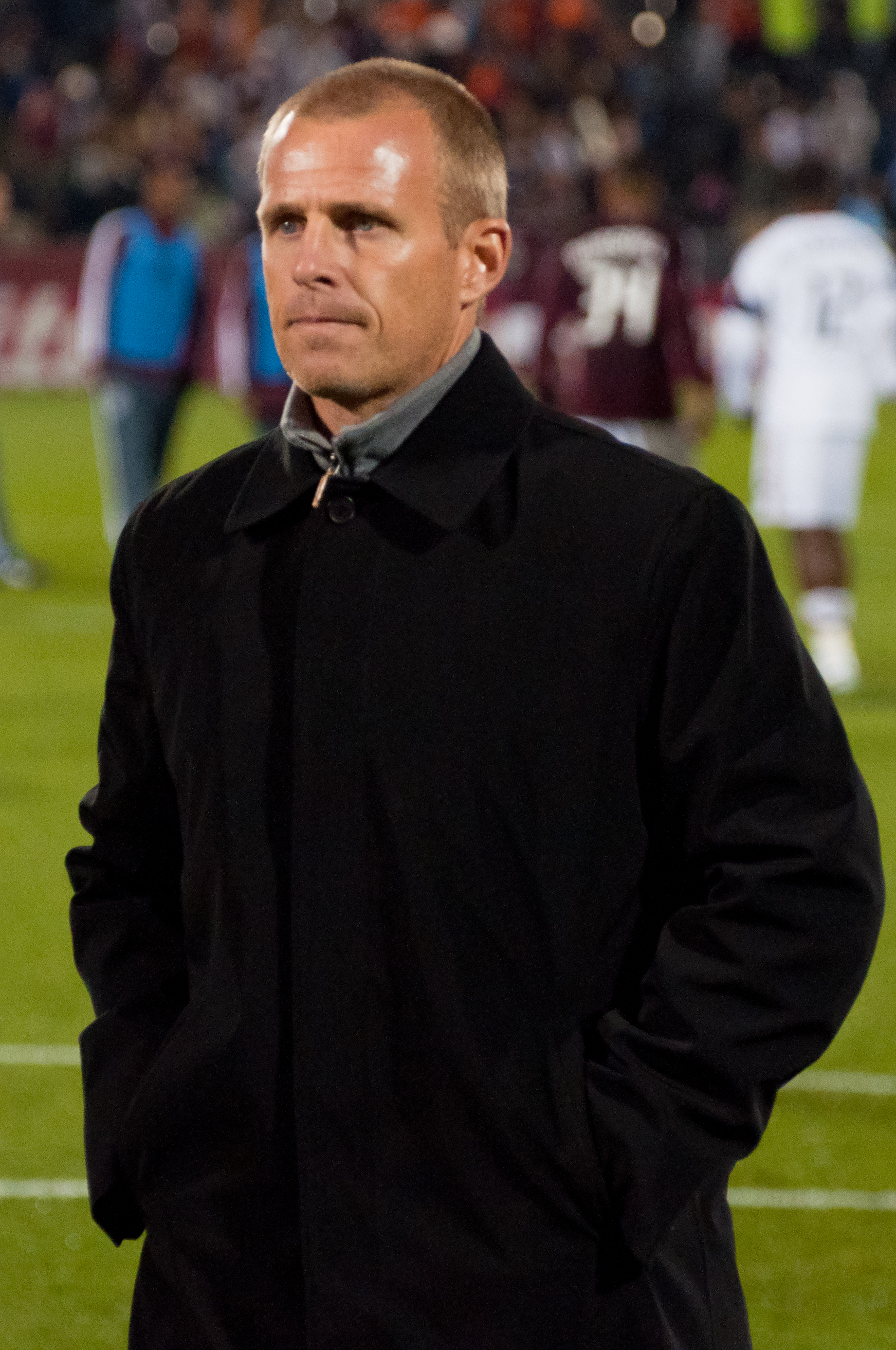
Gary Smith featured 12 times for the U's in the 1987–88 season.

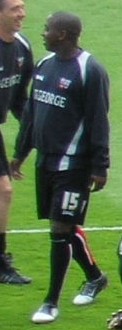
Isaiah Rankin scored five goals in 12 games on loan from Arsenal in 1997.

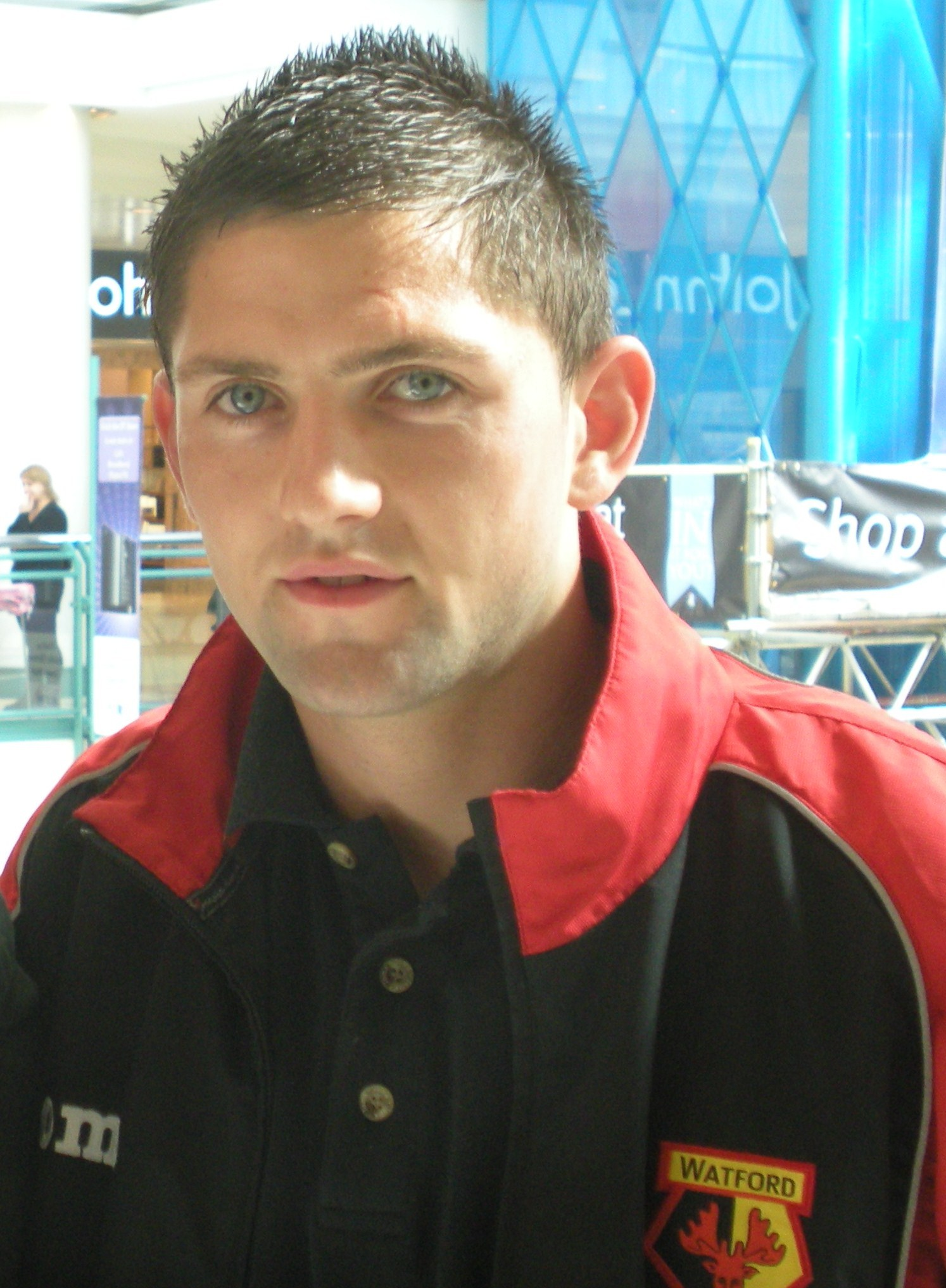
Liam Henderson failed to score in any of his 11 appearances on loan from Watford in 2010.

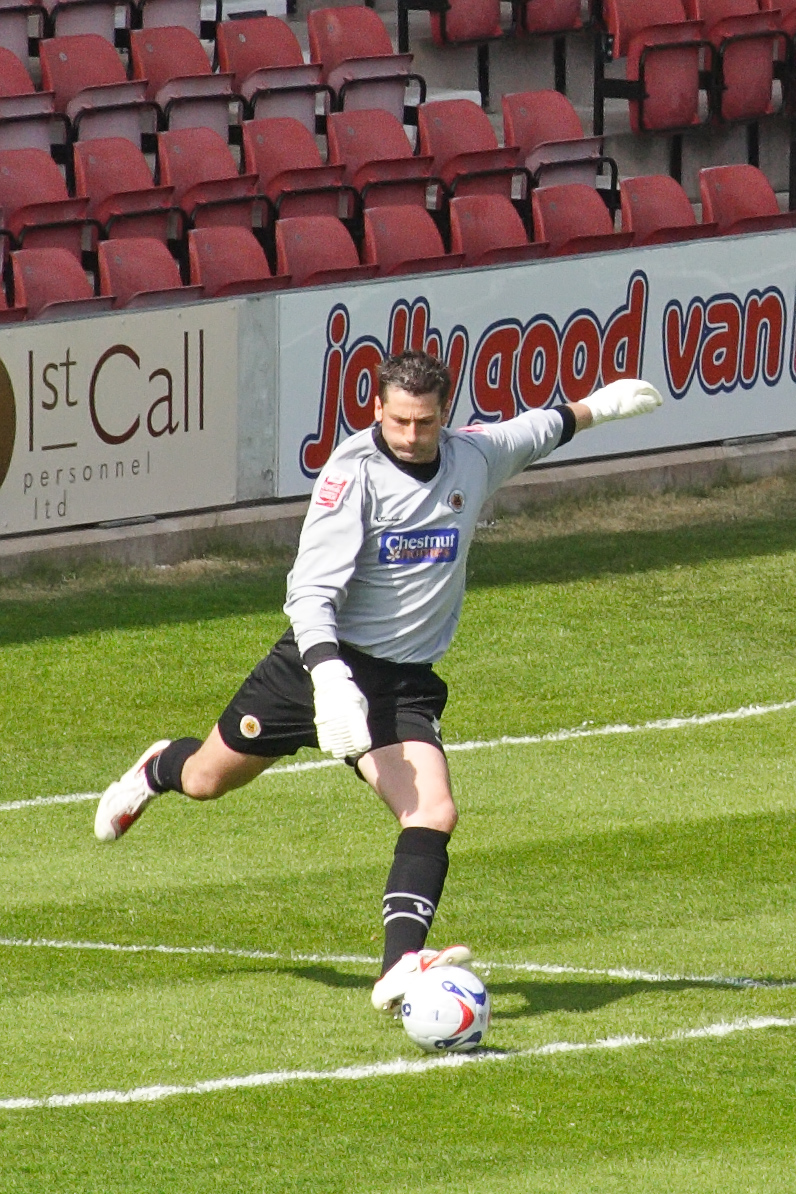
Andy Marriott kept goal for Colchester on ten occasions on loan from Nottingham Forest in 1990.

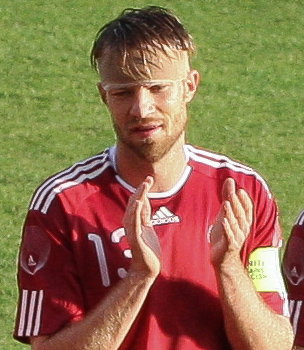
Latvia international Kaspars Gorkšs made nine appearances for the U's during his short-term contract in 2014–15, scoring one goal.

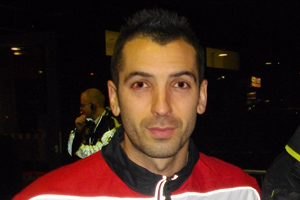
Tom Williams made nine appearances on loan from Bristol City in 2010, scoring once.

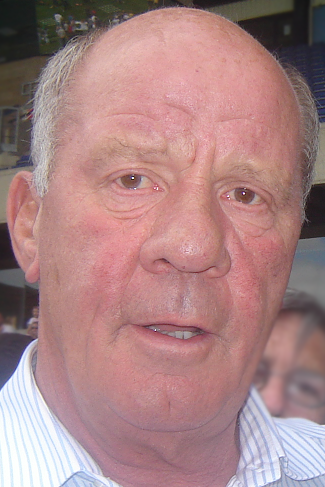
Player-manager Jim Smith made nine first-team appearances between 1972 and 1973.

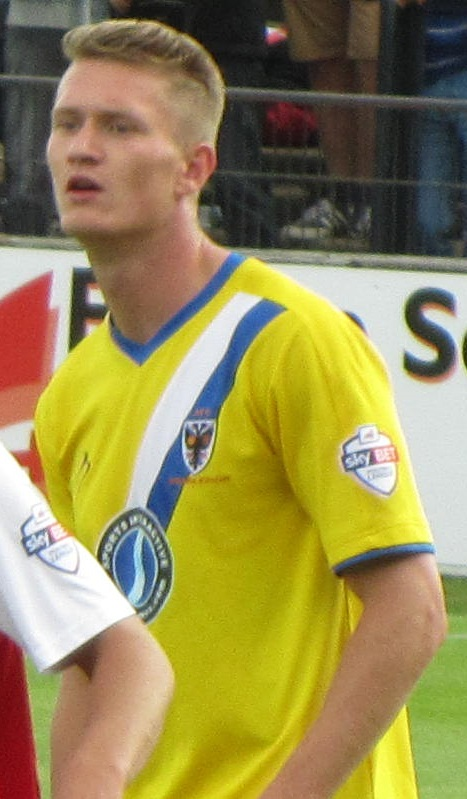
Michael Smith scored two goals in eight appearances on loan from Charlton Athletic in 2013.

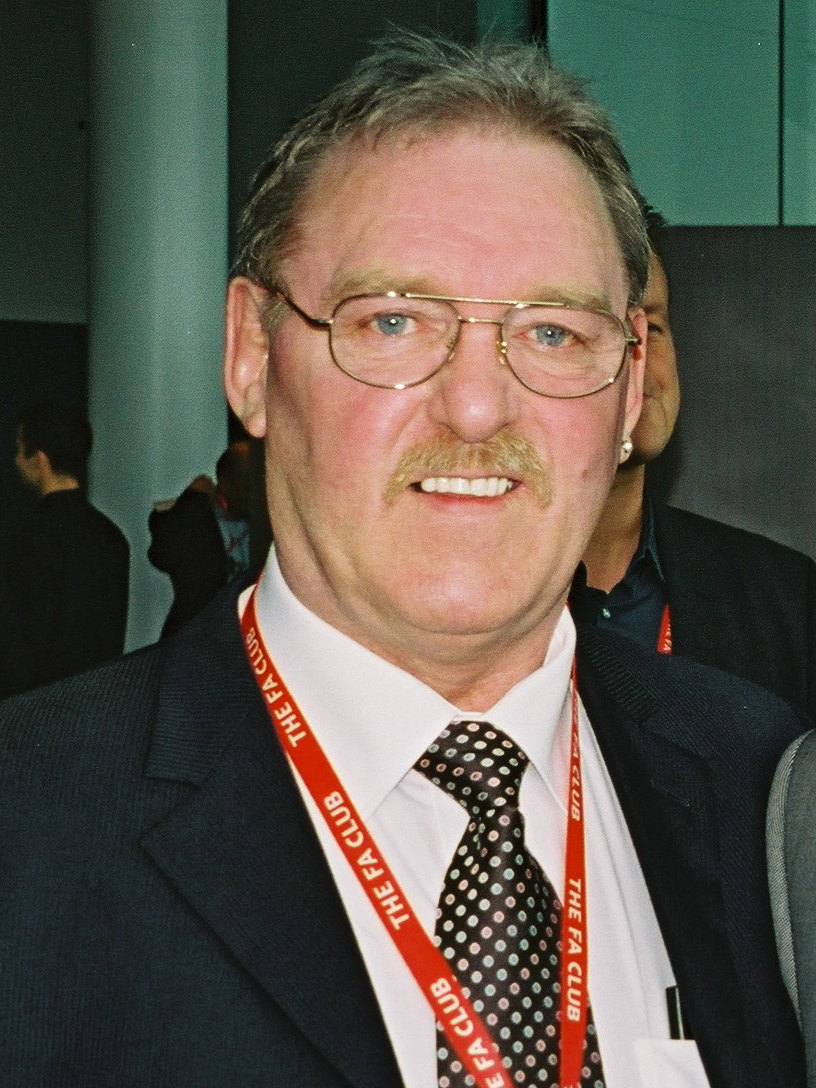
Ex-England defender Kevin Beattie came out of retirement to play for Colchester in 1982, making seven first-team appearances.

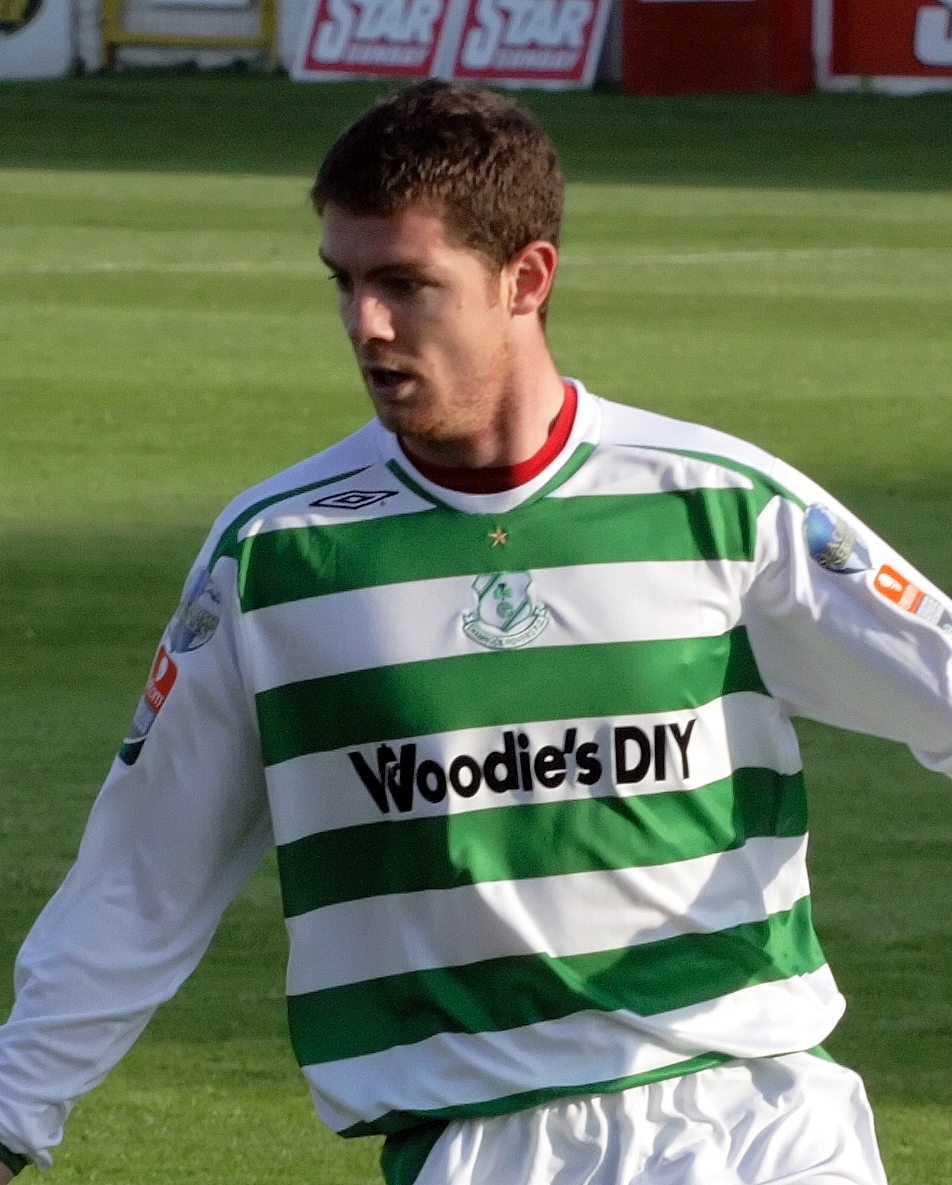
Barry Ferguson made six appearances during his loan spell from Coventry City in 2000.

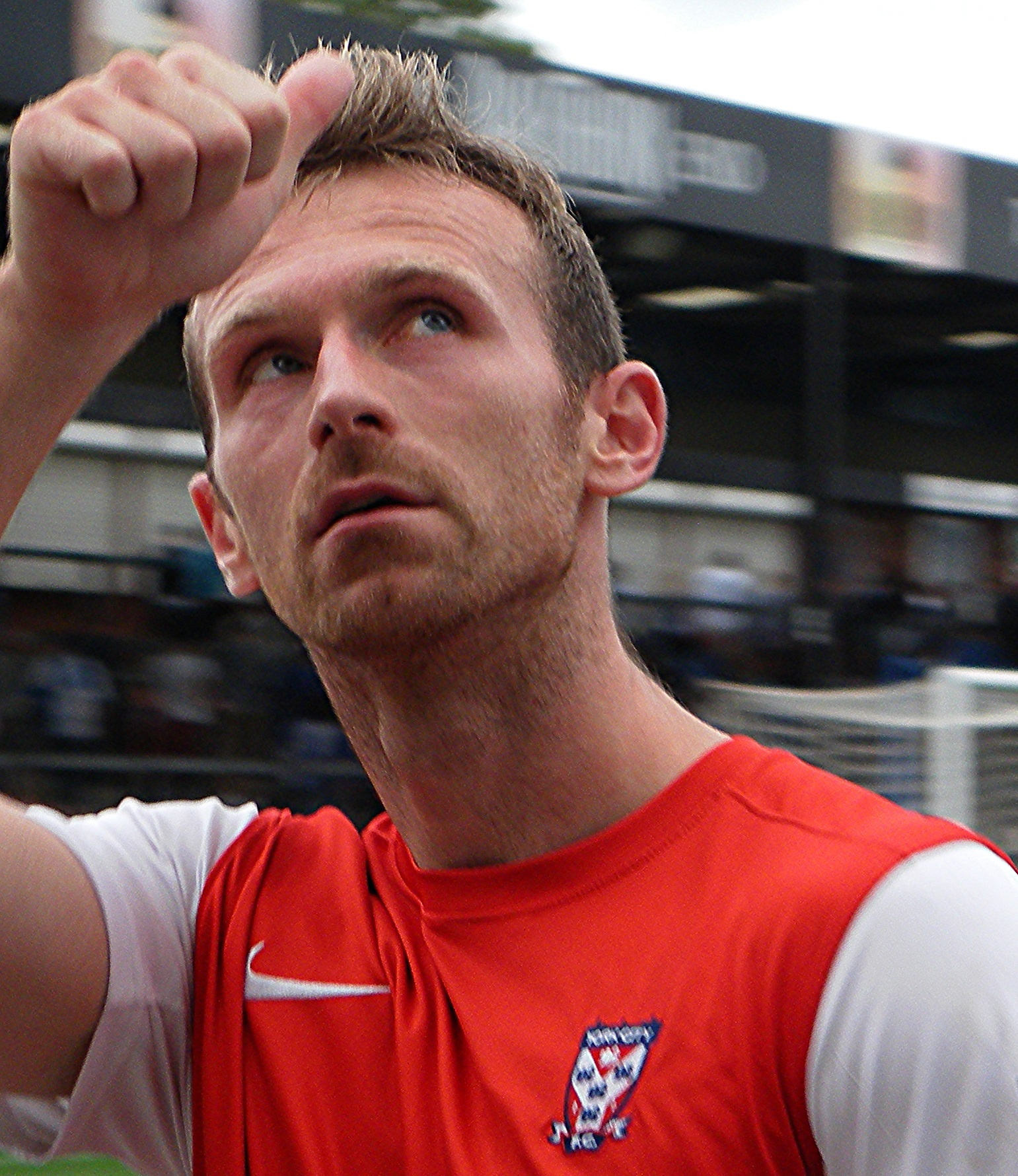
Norwich City loanee Ryan Jarvis made six appearances for the U's from March to May 2005.

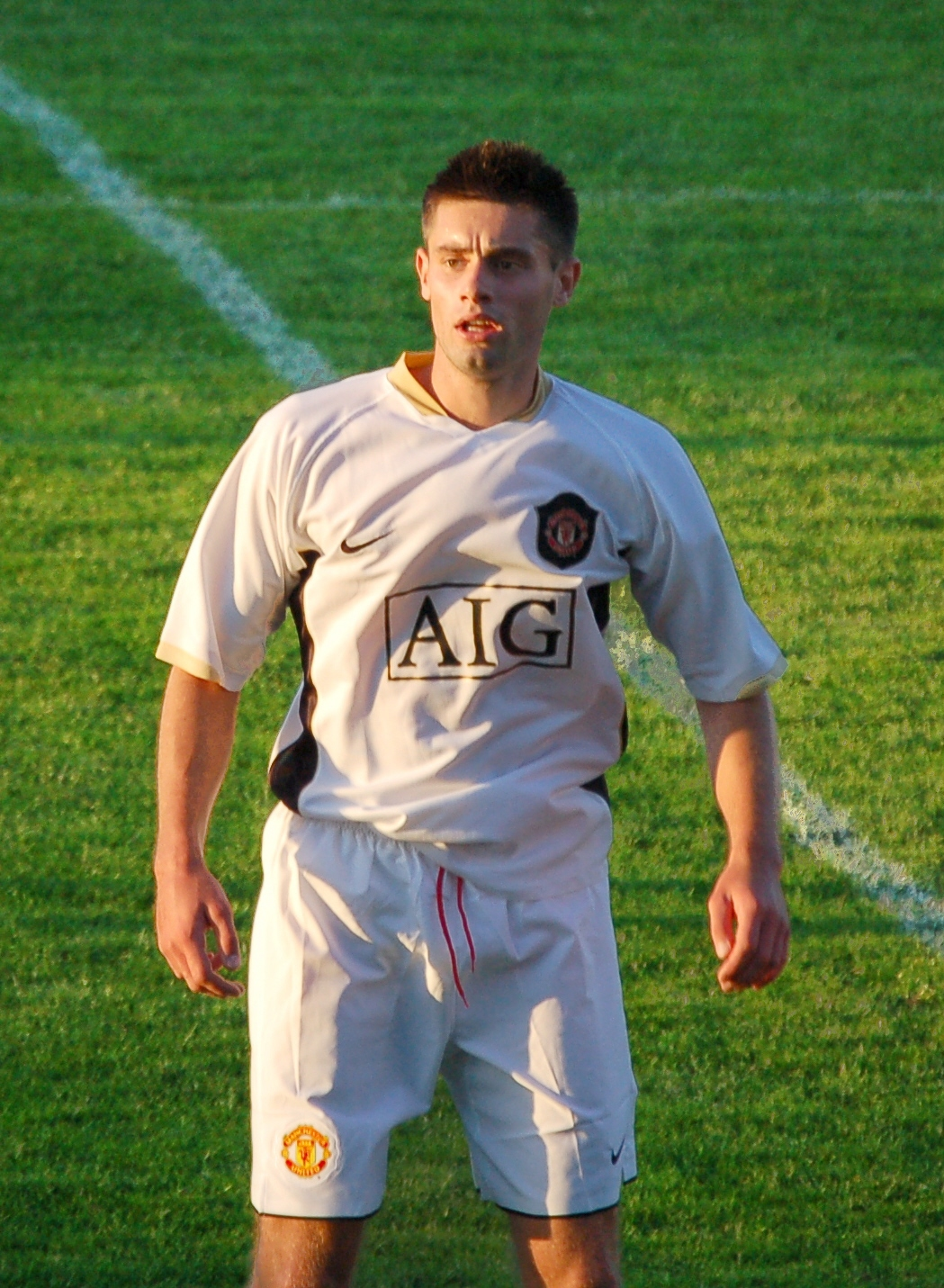
Ritchie Jones made six appearances on loan from Manchester United in 2006.

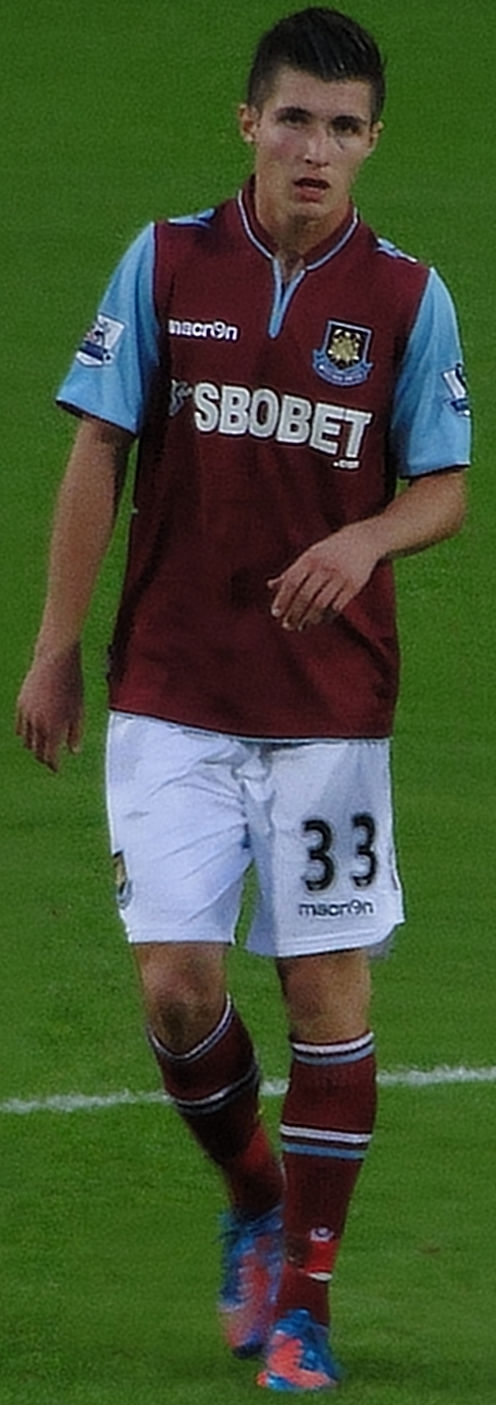
Dan Potts was recalled by parent club West Ham United after making 5 appearances in 2012–13.

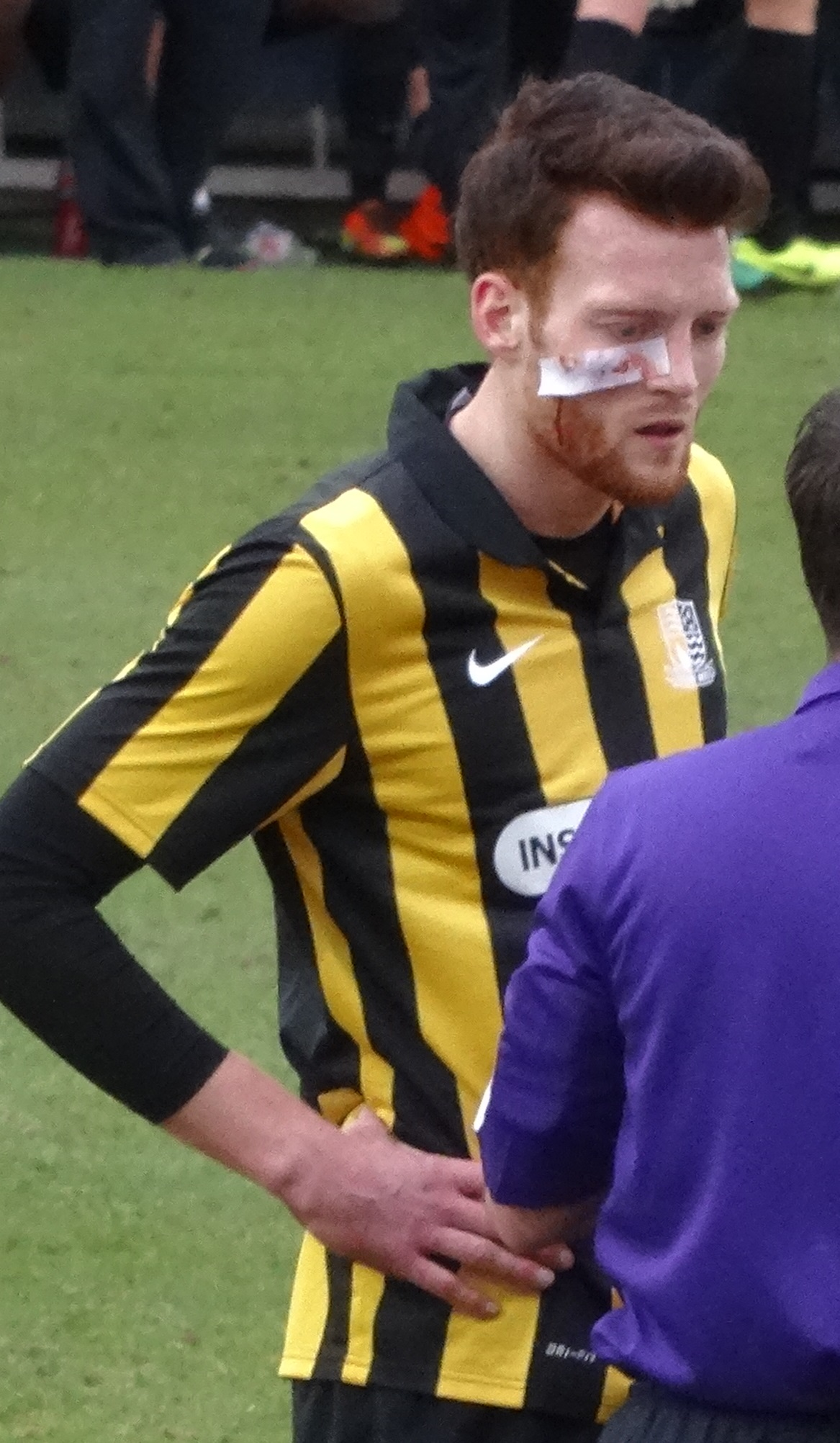
Cian Bolger appeared four times for United on loan from Bolton Wanderers in 2013.

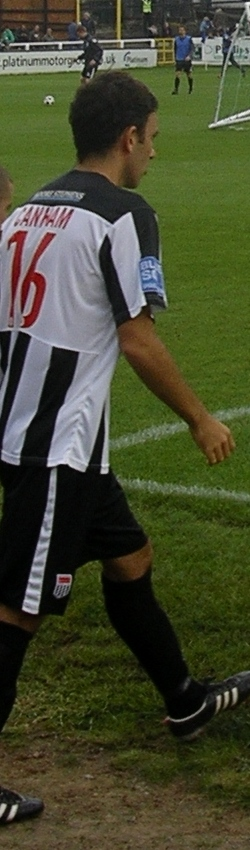
Colchester United academy product Marc Canham made two starts and two substitute appearances for the club between 2002 and 2003.

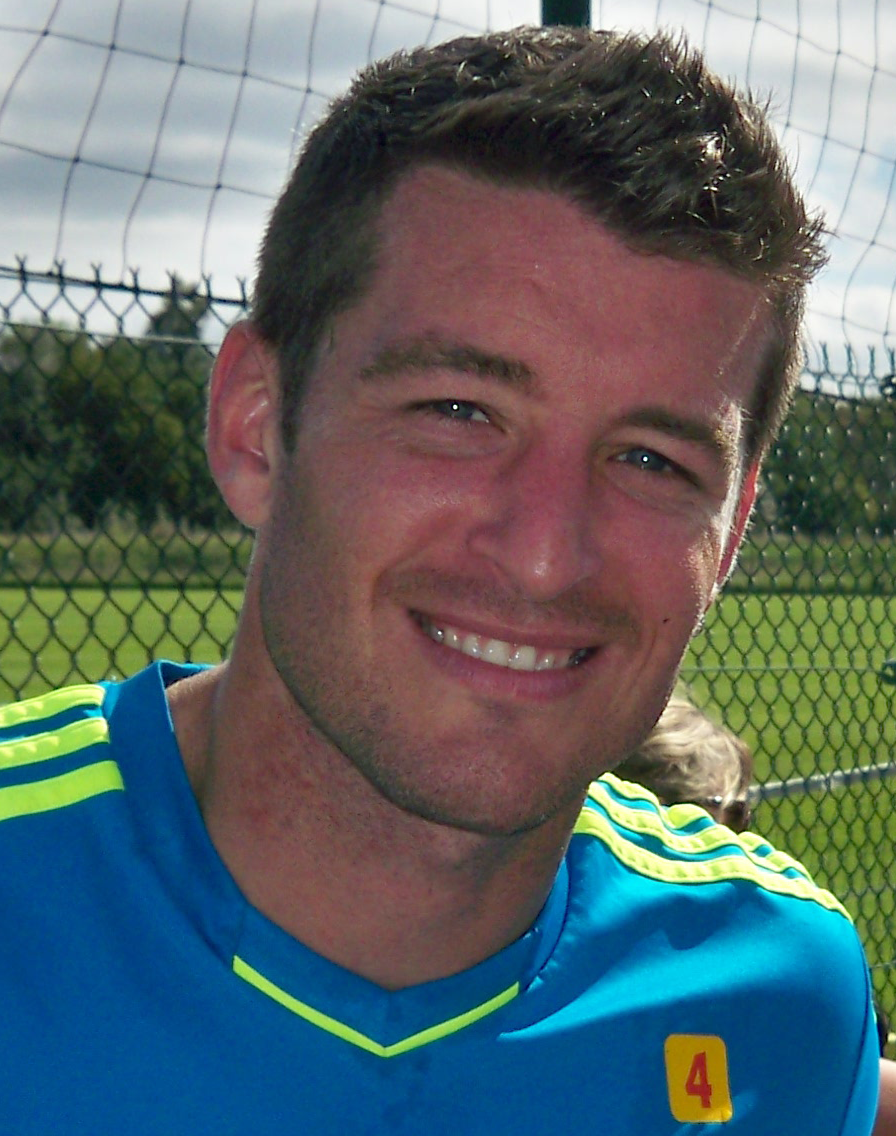
League Cup winner Franck Queudrue joined on loan from Birmingham City for three games in 2010.

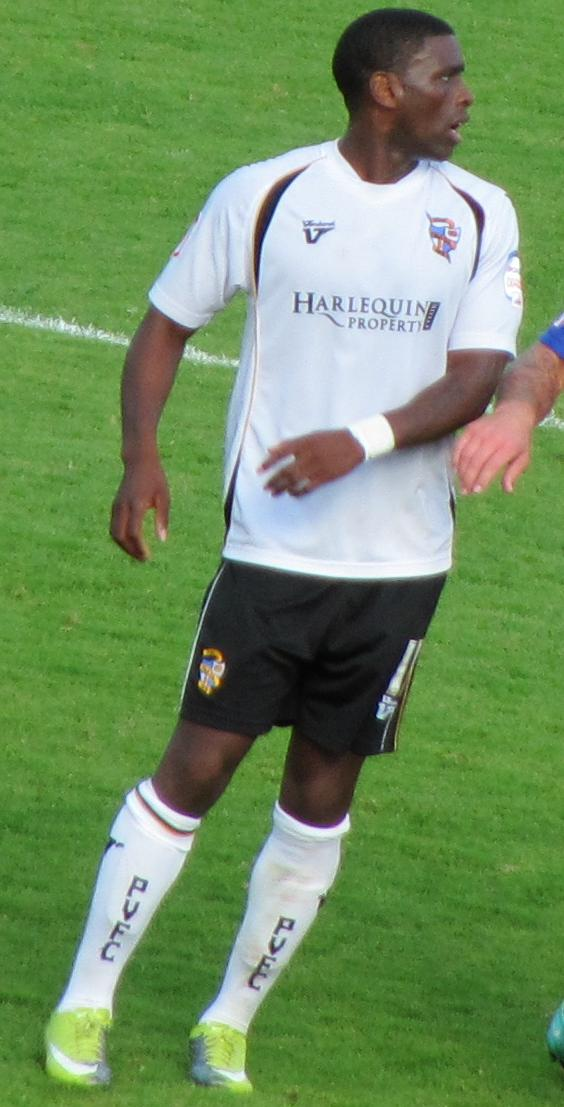
Striker Justin Richards failed to score in any of his three games on loan from Bristol Rovers in 2002.

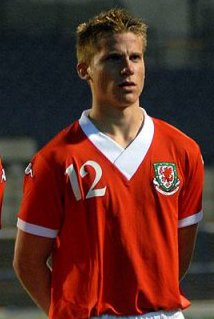
Wales defender Christian Ribeiro played two games on in January 2010 on loan from Bristol City.

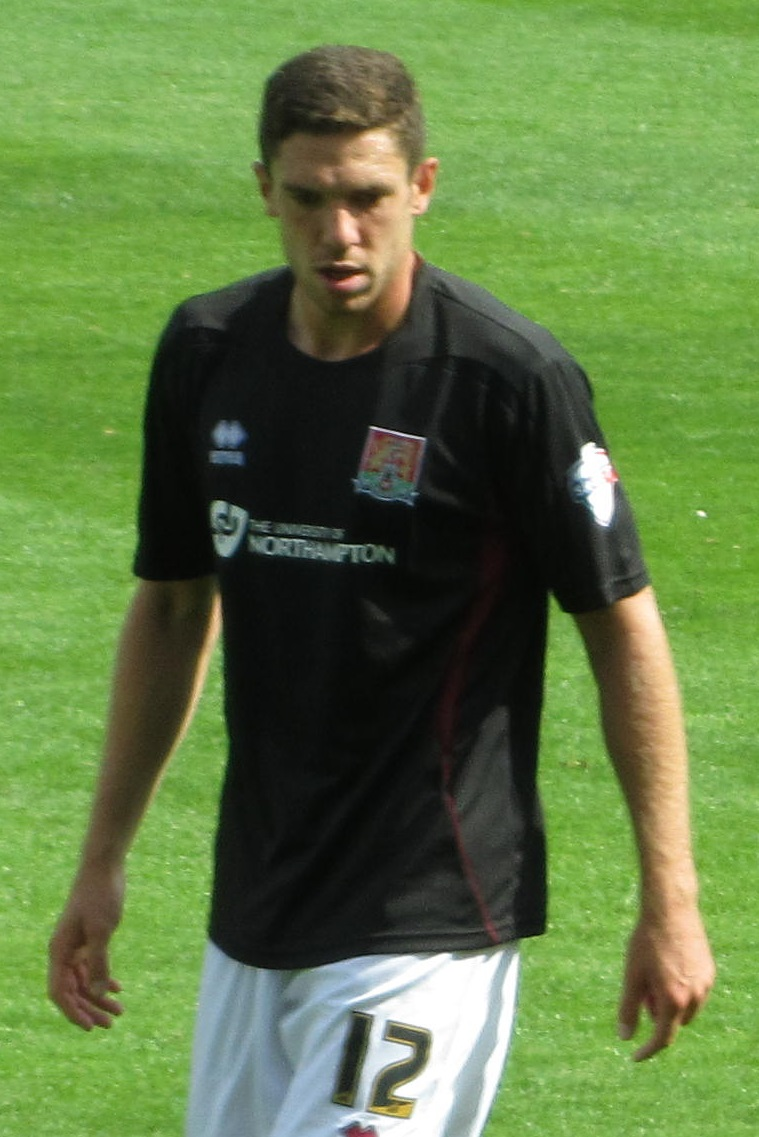
Ben Tozer played one game for Colchester on loan from Northampton Town in 2013.

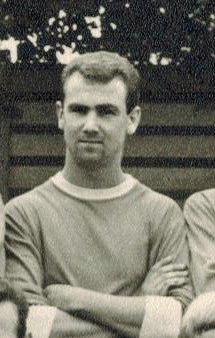
David Laitt, an apprentice with Colchester United, made one substitute appearance for the club in 1965.

Player	Position	Club career	Total starts	Total subs	Total apps	Total goals	Total (yellow card)	Total (red card)	Ref
(England) Warren Aspinall	MF	1999 (Note: On loan from Brentford); 1999	24	0	24	5	7	0	
(Wales) Elliott Hewitt	DF	2014 (Note: On loan from Ipswich Town); 2014–2015	24	0	24	1	2	1	
(England) Garry Richards	DF	2005–2007	19	5	24	1	2	1	
(England) Medy Elito	FW	2008–2010	8	16	24	1	1	1	
(England) Stan Brown	MF	1972–1973	23	0	23	0	0	0	
(England) Peter Barlow	FW	1966–1968	20	3	23	5	0	0	
(England) Josh Thompson	DF	2012 (Note: On loan from Portsmouth); 2013	16	7	23	1	6	1	
(England) Rhys Healey	FW	2014–2015 (Note: On loan from Cardiff City); 2015	8	15	23	4	1	0	
(England) Brian Owen	FW	1970–1971	19	3	22	4	1	0	
(England) Terry Anderson	FW	1974 (Note: On loan from Norwich City); 1975–1976	18	4	22	0	0	0	
(England) Doug Loft	MF	2016–2018	14	8	22	0	6	0	
(England) Ben May	FW	2003 (Note: On loan from Millwall); 2004	9	13	22	2	1	0	
(Scotland) Adam Davidson	FW	1951–1952	21	0	21	1	0	0	
(Scotland) Tom McAlister	GK	1989 (Note: On loan from West Ham United)	21	0	21	0	0	0	
(England) Mark Warren	DF	2002–2003	21	0	21	0	5	2	
(England) Wayne Ward	FB	1982–1983	19	2	21	0	0	0	
(England) Darren Oxbrow	DF	1992	16	5	21	4	0	0	
(England) Brian Honeywood	DF	1968–1969	15	6	21	0	0	0	
(England) Hogan Ephraim	FW	2006–2007	5	16	21	1	4	0	
(Nigeria) KK Opara	FW	1999–2000	3	18	21	0	0	0	
(England) Luke Chambers	CB	2021–	20	0	20	0	3	1	
(England) Luke Garbutt	FB	2013–2014 (Note: On loan from Everton)	20	0	20	3	5	0	
(England) Bob Hodgson	FW	1946–1947	20	0	20	8	0	0	
(England) John Keeley	GK	1993	20	0	20	0	0	1	
(England) Tony Kelly	MF	1988–1989 (Note: On loan from West Bromwich Albion)	20	0	20	2	0	0	
(England) Albert Page	DF	1947	20	0	20	0	0	0	
(Republic of Ireland) Graham Barrett	FW	2001–2002 (Note: On loan from Arsenal)	19	1	20	4	1	0	
(England) Ben Gordon	DF	2014–2015	18	2	20	0	2	0	
(England) Junior Tchamadeu	RB	2020–	16	4	20	0	4	1	
(England) Danny Granville	FB	2007–2008	15	5	20	0	1	0	
(England) Teddy Sheringham	FW	2007–2008	12	8	20	4	0	1	
(England) Brandon Hanlan	FW	2017–2018 (Note: On loan from Charlton Athletic)	11	9	20	2	0	0	
(England) Graham Benstead	GK	1987	19	0	19	0	0	0	
(England) Stan Edwards	FW	1952–1953	19	0	19	7	0	0	
(England) Ryan Inniss	DF	2017–2018 (Note: On loan from Crystal Palace)	19	0	19	0	1	0	
(Ireland) Paddy Shiels	FB	1945–1946	19	0	19	1	0	0	
(England) Cole Skuse	DM	2021–	19	0	19	0	3	0	
(England) David Prutton	MF	2010 (Note: On loan from Leeds United); 2010	18	1	19	3	7	1	
(England) Bobby Moss	FW	1972–1973	17	2	19	3	0	0	
(England) Elliot Lee	FW	2013; 2016	15	4	19	3	2	0	
(England) Kyel Reid	FW	2017–2018 (Note: On loan from Coventry City)	15	4	19	3	1	1	
(England) George Porter	FW	2013 (Note: On loan from Burnley)	13	6	19	1	5	1	
(England) Bob Walker	DF	1967–1968	13	6	19	0	0	0	
(England) Sylvester Jasper	FW	2021– (Note: On loan from Fulham)	12	7	19	3	2	0	
(Republic of Ireland) Tommy Keane	FW	1988	12	7	19	0	0	0	
(England) Luke Hannant	MF	2021–	11	8	19	0	2	0	
(England) Dave Hubbick	FW	1983–1985	7	12	19	1	0	0	
(Nigeria) Akanni-Sunday Wasiu	FW	2008–2009	5	14	19	2	1	0	
(England) Peter Aitchison	FW	1951–1954	18	0	18	2	0	0	
(England) Nathan Clarke	DF	2011 (Note: On loan from Huddersfield Town)	18	0	18	0	3	0	
(England) Billy Clifford	MF	2013 (Note: On loan from Chelsea)	18	0	18	1	2	0	
(England) Bob Collins	FW	1946	18	0	18	7	0	0	
(England) Jamie Jones	GK	2015 (Note: On loan from Preston North End)	18	0	18	0	0	0	
(England) Dave Swindlehurst	FW	1988–1989	18	0	18	6	0	0	
(England) Danny Batth	DF	2009–2010 (Note: On loan from Wolverhampton Wanderers)	17	1	18	1	4	0	
(England) Bobby Howlett	DF	1969–1970	11	7	18	0	1	0	
(Wales) Gareth Salisbury	FW	1964–1965	17	0	17	3	0	0	
(England) Ray Price	FB	1965–1967	15	2	17	0	0	0	
(Hungary) Béla Balogh	DF	2007–2008 (Note: On loan from MTK Budapest)	10	7	17	0	2	0	
(Wales) Cameron Coxe	DF	2021– (Note: On loan from Solihull Moors)	10	7	17	0	2	0	
(England) John Warner	FW	1989–1990	8	9	17	3	0	0	
(England) Andy Arnott	MF	1999 (Note: On loan from Brighton & Hove Albion); 1999–2000	6	11	17	0	1	0	
(England) Laurie Ryan	FW	1990 (Note: On loan from Cambridge United); 1990–1991	6	11	17	3	0	0	
(England) Alan Eagles	FB	1961	16	0	16	1	0	0	
(England) Karl Goddard	FB	1990 (Note: On loan from Bradford City)	16	0	16	1	0	0	
(England) Paul Newell	GK	1992 (Note: On loan from Leyton Orient)	16	0	16	0	0	0	
(England) Jimmy Walker	GK	2008–2009	16	0	16	0	0	0	
(Jamaica) Michail Antonio	FW	2011 (Note: On loan from Reading)	15	1	16	4	1	0	
(England) Charlie Daniels	DF	2021–	15	1	16	0	1	0	
(England) Matthew Connolly	DF	2007	13	3	16	2	1	0	
(England) Les Mutrie	FW	1984	11	5	16	2	0	0	
(England) Craig Farley	DF	1999–2000	10	6	16	0	1	0	
(England) Ian Hathaway	FW	1997–1998	8	8	16	1	1	0	
(England) Luke Guttridge	MF	2007–2008	7	9	16	0	2	0	
(England) Tully Day	FW	1937–1938	15	0	15	15	0	0	
(England) Chris Harman	FW	1945–1946	15	0	15	4	0	0	
(England) Sid Jones	FB	1945–1946	15	0	15	2	0	0	
(England) John Moore	HB	1949–1952	15	0	15	0	0	0	
(France) Stéphane Pounewatchy	DF	1999	15	0	15	1	5	0	
(England) Nicky Shorey	DF	2016	14	1	15	0	1	0	
(England) Brian Westlake	FW	1967	14	1	15	5	0	0	
(England) Steve Restarick	FW	1990–1992	4	11	15	5	0	0	
(England) Joshua Bohui	FW	2020–2021	1	14	15	1	0	0	
(England) Arthur Biggs	FW	1947	14	0	14	5	0	0	
(Wales) Cliff Birch	FW	1954–1955	14	0	14	4	0	0	
(England) Peter Chiswick	GK	1946–1947	14	0	14	0	0	0	
(England) Reg Smith	FW	1937	14	0	14	10	0	0	
(England) Guy Branston	DF	1998 (Note: On loan from Leicester City); 1998	13	1	14	1	2	1	
(England) Robert Hopkins	FW	1993	13	1	14	1	0	0	
(England) Cole Kpekawa	DF	2014–2015 (Note: On loan from Queens Park Rangers); 2017–2018	11	3	14	0	1	0	
(England) Robin Turner	FW	1985 (Note: On loan from Swansea City); 1985–1986	9	5	14	0	0	0	
(Sudan) Abo Eisa	WG	2019 (Note: On loan from Shrewsbury Town)	8	6	14	2	0	0	
(England) Diaz Wright	MF	2016–2019	8	6	14	0	1	0	
(England) Steve Mardenborough	FW	1995	6	8	14	2	0	0	
(Canada) Niall Thompson	FW	1994–1995	5	9	14	5	0	0	
(England) Tony Thorpe	FW	2006	5	9	14	0	1	0	
(England) David Barnes	FB	1996	13	0	13	0	3	0	
(England) Harry Brown	GK	1945–1946	13	0	13	0	0	0	
(England) David Burnside	MF	1972 (Note: On loan from Bristol City)	13	0	13	0	0	0	
(Australia) Tommy McColl	FW	1963–1964	13	0	13	2	0	0	
(England) Frank Rist	DF	1947–1948	13	0	13	1	0	0	
(England) Jack Southam	FB	1945–1946	13	0	13	1	0	0	
(Republic of Ireland) Bradley Garmston	FB	2013	10	3	13	0	1	0	
(England) Grant Watts	FW	1994	8	5	13	2	0	0	
(England) Aramide Oteh	ST	2021	4	9	13	1	1	0	
(England) Steve Cartwright	FB	1988	12	0	12	0	0	0	
(Spain) José Gallego	FW	1949–1951	12	0	12	1	0	0	
(England) John Hornsby	FW	1965–1966	12	0	12	1	0	0	
(Scotland) Marino Keith	FW	2005	12	0	12	4	1	0	
(Northern Ireland) Frank McCourt	HB	1954–1955	12	0	12	0	0	0	
(England) Wally Nunn	HB	1948–1949	12	0	12	0	0	0	
(England) Gary Smith	MF	1987–1988	12	0	12	0	3	0	
(England) Ray Townrow	FW	1948–1949	12	0	12	5	0	0	
(England) John Vaughan	GK	1997 (Note: On loan from Lincoln City); 1999	12	0	12	0	0	1	
(England) Dave Martin	MF	1992 (Note: On loan from Southend United)	11	1	12	0	0	0	
(England) Isaiah Rankin	FW	1997	11	1	12	5	2	0	
(England) Carl Asaba	FW	1995	9	3	12	2	0	0	
(Republic of Ireland) Alan Judge	AM	2021–	9	3	12	1	0	0	
(England) Lewis Gobern	FW	2009	5	7	12	0	1	0	
(England) Rekeil Pyke	FW	2017	4	8	12	0	1	0	
(England) Colwyn Rowe	FW	1974–1975	4	8	12	2	0	0	
(England) Junior Ogedi-Uzokwe	FW	2018–2020	3	9	12	1	0	0	
(England) John Pollard	DF	1989–1991	3	9	12	1	0	0	
(Saint Kitts and Nevis) Sagi Burton-Godwin	DF	1999	11	0	11	0	5	1	
(Canada) Craig Forrest	GK	1988	11	0	11	0	0	0	
(England) Bob Harding	DF	1946	11	0	11	0	0	0	
(Scotland) Joe Locherty	HB	1950–1951	11	0	11	1	0	0	
(England) Gary Moore	FW	1974	11	0	11	7	0	0	
(England) Jacob Murphy	FW	2015	11	0	11	4	0	0	
(Wales) Bill Pendergast	FW	1937–1938	11	0	11	6	0	0	
(England) Frank Rawcliffe	FW	1946	11	0	11	3	0	0	
(England) Nigel Crouch	FB	1980–1981	10	1	11	0	0	1	
(Albania) Armando Dobra	WG/AM	2021–	8	3	11	2	2	0	
(England) Liam Henderson	FW	2010 (Note: On loan from Watford)	1	10	11	0	1	0	
(England) Fred Barber	GK	1993 (Note: On loan from Peterborough United)	10	0	10	0	0	0	
(England) Martin Binks	DF	1972	10	0	10	0	0	0	
(England) Peter Carey	FB	1961	10	0	10	0	0	0	
(England) Ian Haley	FB	1938–1939	10	0	10	0	0	0	
(England) Tony Howe	FW	1960	10	0	10	2	0	0	
(South Africa) Bongani Khumalo	DF	2015 (Note: On loan from Tottenham Hotspur)	10	0	10	0	0	0	
(Wales) Andy Marriott	GK	1990 (Note: On loan from Nottingham Forest)	10	0	10	0	0	0	
(England) John Taylor	FW	1983; 1996 (Note: On loan from Luton Town)	9	1	10	5	0	0	
(England) Keith Williams	MF	1987–1988	9	1	10	0	1	0	
(England) Robbie Devereux	MF	1989; 1992	6	4	10	0	0	0	
(Wales) Aaron Collins	FW	2018	5	5	10	1	0	0	
(England) Nicke Kabamba	FW	2017	4	6	10	0	0	0	
(England) Sanmi Odelusi	FW	2017	2	8	10	1	0	0	
(England) John Richardson	FW	1993	2	8	10	0	0	0	
(Latvia) Kaspars Gorkšs	DF	2014–2015	9	0	9	1	0	0	
(England) Joe James	DF	1945–1946	9	0	9	0	0	0	
(Republic of Ireland) Brian Launders	MF	1999 (Note: On loan from Derby County); 1999	9	0	9	0	2	0	
(England) Dave Leworthy	FW	1991	9	0	9	4	0	0	
(England) Brian Sherratt	GK	1970–1971	9	0	9	0	0	0	
(Cyprus) Tom Williams	FB	2010	9	0	9	1	0	0	
(England) Matt Mills	DF	2007 (Note: On loan from Manchester City)	8	1	9	0	2	0	
(England) Keith Scott	FW	2000; 2001	8	1	9	1	0	0	
(England) Jim Smith	MF	1972–1973	8	1	9	0	0	0	
(England) Daryl Godbold	FB	1984	7	2	9	1	1	0	
(Republic of Ireland) Martin Rowlands	MF	2012	7	2	9	2	1	0	
(England) Danny Steele	DF	2002	7	2	9	0	1	1	
(England) Jeffrey Monakana	FW	2013	6	3	9	1	0	0	
(England) Paul Taylor	MF	1974 (Note: On loan from York City)	6	3	9	0	0	0	
(Scotland) George Burley	FB	1994	5	4	9	0	0	0	
(England) Lee Hunter	FW	1988–1989	5	4	9	0	0	0	
(England) Sean Farrell	FW	1988	4	5	9	1	0	0	
(France) Steve Germain	FW	1999 (Note: On loan from AS Cannes); 1999	2	7	9	0	0	0	
(Democratic Republic of the Congo) Guylain Ndumbu-Nsungu	FW	2005	2	7	9	1	1	0	
(England) Lloyd Opara	FW	2001–2002	0	9	9	0	0	0	
(Canada) Garrett Caldwell	GK	1995–1997	8	0	8	0	0	0	
(England) Tamer Fernandes	GK	1999	8	0	8	0	0	0	
(England) Ron George	FB	1954–1955	8	0	8	0	0	0	
(England) Ron Green	GK	1992 (Note: On loan from Kidderminster Harriers)	8	0	8	0	0	0	
(England) Ronnie Hornby	FW	1945	8	0	8	3	0	0	
(England) Christian Hyslop	FB	1994	8	0	8	0	0	1	
(England) Dean Martin	FW	1993	8	0	8	2	0	0	
(England) Douglas Smale	FW	1946	8	0	8	0	0	0	
(England) Trevor Smith	FW	1947	8	0	8	2	0	0	
(England) Ivan Thacker	FW	1938–1945	8	0	8	2	0	0	
(England) Wilmott	FW	1945–1946	8	0	8	1	0	0	
(England) Ethan Ross	GK	2019	7	1	8	0	1	0	
(England) Tony Sorrell	MF	1992	7	1	8	2	1	1	
(England) Derek Harrison	DF	1975–1976	6	2	8	0	0	0	
(Northern Ireland) Pat Sharkey	MF	1978	6	2	8	0	0	0	
(England) Leke Odunsi	MF	2002	3	5	8	0	1	0	
(England) Michael Smith	FW	2013	3	5	8	1	0	0	
(England) Ryan Gondoh	LW	2018–2019	1	7	8	0	1	0	
(England) Jackie Bell	HB	1965–1966	7	0	7	0	0	0	
(England) Sid Bidewell	FW	1946	7	0	7	4	0	0	
(England) Barney Bircham	GK	1951	7	0	7	0	0	0	
(Australia) Con Blatsis	DF	2002	7	0	7	0	2	0	
(England) Dennis Cant	FW	1946	7	0	7	5	0	0	
(England) John Linford	FW	1983	7	0	7	0	0	0	
(England) Matt Lockwood	FB	2008–2009	7	0	7	0	1	0	
(England) Ernie Matthews	FW	1938–1939	7	0	7	4	0	0	
(England) Bob Neville	FW	1946–1947	7	0	7	2	0	0	
(England) Rodney Rooke	FB	1988–1989	7	0	7	0	0	0	
(England) Ron Willis	GK	1968–1970	7	0	7	0	0	0	
(England) Kevin Beattie	DF	1982	6	1	7	0	0	0	
(England) Miquel Scarlett	RB/MF	2020	6	1	7	0	0	0	
(England) Adam Nichols	DF	1983–1984	5	2	7	1	0	0	
(England) Steve Pitt	FW	1969	5	2	7	0	0	0	
(England) Gene Kennedy	MF	2021–	3	4	7	0	1	0	
(England) Samson Tovide	FW	2020–	2	5	7	0	0	1	
(Cameroon) Mvondo Atangana	FW	2002–2003	1	6	7	0	0	0	
(Wales) Jack Compton	MF	2013	1	6	7	0	1	0	
(England) Liam Mandeville	FW	2018 (Note: On loan from Doncaster Rovers)	1	6	7	0	0	0	
(Wales) Tommy O'Sullivan	MF	2017	1	6	7	0	1	0	
(England) Ben Bowditch	MF	2004	0	7	7	0	0	0	
(France) Joël Thomas	FW	2009–2010	0	7	7	0	1	0	
(England) Robert Brown	GK	1946	6	0	6	0	0	0	
(England) David H Coleman	FB	1988 (Note: On loan from Bournemouth)	6	0	6	1	0	0	
(England) Harry Cranfield	FW	1948–1949	6	0	6	0	0	0	
(Scotland) Jock Ferguson	FW	1945–1946	6	0	6	0	0	0	
(England) Ian Gillespie	FW	1947	6	0	6	2	0	0	
(England) John Halls	FB	2002	6	0	6	0	0	0	
(England) Gary Harvey	FW	1980	6	0	6	2	0	0	
(England) Percy Heal	HB	1945	6	0	6	0	0	0	
(England) Eddie Presland	FB	1969	6	0	6	0	0	0	
(England) Jon Sheffield	GK	1993–1994	6	0	6	0	0	0	
(England) Paul Shinners	FW	1985 (Note: On loan from Gillingham)	6	0	6	1	1	0	
(England) Stan Titcombe	FW	1945	6	0	6	1	0	0	
(England) Taffy Williams	FW	1947–1948	6	0	6	0	0	0	
(England) Leo Chambers	DF	2016	5	1	6	0	1	0	
(Republic of Ireland) Barry Ferguson	DF	2000	5	1	6	0	1	0	
(England) Gary Osbourne	FB	1991	5	1	6	0	0	0	
(England) Sam Saunders	MF	2019	5	1	6	0	1	0	
(England) Neal Trotman	DF	2009	5	1	6	0	1	0	
(England) Julian Hazel	FW	1992	4	2	6	0	0	0	
(England) Ollie Kensdale	DF	2018–2020	4	2	6	0	0	0	
(Finland) Glen Kamara	MF	2016	3	3	6	0	0	0	
(Republic of Ireland) Billy Clarke	FW	2006	2	4	6	0	1	0	
(England) Ryan Jarvis	FW	2005	2	4	6	0	0	0	
(Republic of Ireland) Olamide Shodipo	WG	2018	2	4	6	0	1	0	
(England) Adam Tanner	MF	2000	2	4	6	0	1	0	
(England) Ritchie Jones	MF	2006 (Note: On loan from Manchester United)	0	6	6	0	1	0	
(England) Freddie Ladapo	FW	2012–2013	0	6	6	0	0	0	
(England) Gary Borrowdale	FB	2008	5	0	5	0	0	0	
(Scotland) Danny Cameron	FB	1975 (Note: On loan from Sheffield Wednesday)	5	0	5	0	0	0	
(England) Mark Coombe	GK	1988	5	0	5	0	0	0	
(England) Arron Davis	FB	1994 (Note: On loan from Plymouth Argyle)	5	0	5	0	0	0	
(Wales) Jermaine Easter	FW	2008	5	0	5	2	2	0	
(England) Norman George	FW	1949	5	0	5	1	0	0	
(England) Jake Kean	GK	2016	5	0	5	0	0	0	
(England) Glenn Keeley	DF	1988 (Note: On loan from Oldham Athletic)	5	0	5	0	2	0	
(England) John Le Mare	GK	1947–1948	5	0	5	0	0	0	
(England) Ian McDonald	MF	1975 (Note: On loan from Liverpool)	5	0	5	2	0	0	
(England) Colin Moughton	DF	1968	5	0	5	0	0	0	
(Australia) Andy Petterson	GK	1996	5	0	5	0	0	0	
(England) Dan Potts	DF	2012–2013	5	0	5	0	1	0	
(England) Reeves	FW	1945	5	0	5	1	0	0	
(England) Matt Taylor	DF	2013	5	0	5	1	0	0	
(England) John Wright	GK	1955–1961	5	0	5	0	0	0	
(England) Paul Aimson	FW	1973–1974	4	1	5	2	0	0	
(Northern Ireland) Josh Doherty	LB	2021 (Note: On loan from Crawley Town)	4	1	5	0	0	0	
(England) Marc Goodfellow	FW	2005	4	1	5	1	0	0	
(England) Nathan Munson	GK	1993	4	1	5	0	0	1	
(England) Jake Turner	GK	2021– (Note: On loan from Newcastle United)	4	1	5	0	0	0	
(England) Andy Walker	GK	1999–2000	4	1	5	0	0	0	
(England) Mike Edwards	DF	2003	3	2	5	0	1	0	
(England) Sean Campbell	FW	1993–1994	2	3	5	0	0	0	
(England) Alan Dennis	DF	1970–1971	2	3	5	0	0	0	
(England) James Goodwin	DF	1991	2	3	5	0	0	0	
(England) Robbie King	MF	2005–2006	2	3	5	0	0	0	
(England) Andy Partner	DF	1991–1994	2	3	5	0	0	0	
(Republic of Ireland) Louis Dunne	MF	2016	1	4	5	0	0	0	
(Northern Ireland) Jamie Harney	DF	2014; 2015–2016	1	4	5	0	0	0	
(England) Dean Howell	MF	2005	1	4	5	0	1	0	
(England) Dan Holman	FW	2014	0	5	5	0	0	0	
(England) Jack Marriott	FW	2015	0	5	5	1	0	0	
(England) Marley Marshall-Miranda	MF	2020–	0	5	5	0	1	0	
(England) Harvey Sayer	LB	2020–	0	5	5	0	0	0	
(Ireland) Cecil Allan	FB	1938–1945	4	0	4	0	0	0	
(England) Bradley Allen	FW	1999	4	0	4	1	1	0	
(England) John Baines	FW	1961–1962	4	0	4	0	0	0	
(England) George Barnard	FW	1945	4	0	4	1	0	0	
(England) Les Barrell	FW	1956	4	0	4	1	0	0	
(England) Mark Blake	DF	1989 (Note: On loan from Southampton)	4	0	4	1	0	0	
(Republic of Ireland) Cian Bolger	DF	2013 (Note: On loan from Bolton Wanderers)	4	0	4	0	2	0	
(England) Ian Brown	FW	1994	4	0	4	1	0	0	
(England) Roger Hansbury	GK	1989 (Note: On loan from Birmingham City)	4	0	4	0	0	0	
(England) Derek Hawksworth	FW	1945–1946	4	0	4	1	0	0	
(England) Karl Hawley	FW	2009	4	0	4	0	0	0	
(England) Bobby Hoines	FW	1946	4	0	4	0	0	0	
(England) Adrian Keith	DF	1983	4	0	4	0	0	0	
(England) Alex Kingston	GK	1946	4	0	4	0	0	0	
(England) George Law	FW	1939	4	0	4	2	0	0	
(England) Billy Leighton	FW	1945–1946	4	0	4	0	0	0	
(Republic of Ireland) Paul McGee	FW	1989	4	0	4	0	0	0	
(England) George Merritt	FW	1938–1939	4	0	4	0	0	0	
(England) W Milne	FB	1945	4	0	4	0	0	0	
(England) Karleigh Osborne	DF	2015	4	0	4	0	1	0	
(England) Robson	DF	1945	4	0	4	0	0	0	
(England) Peter Silvester	FW	1973	4	0	4	0	0	0	
(Scotland) Malcolm Slater	FW	1969	4	0	4	0	1	0	
(England) John South	DF	1972	4	0	4	0	0	0	
(England) John Sullivan	GK	2012	4	0	4	0	0	0	
(Republic of Ireland) Paul Tierney	FB	2004	4	0	4	0	1	0	
(England) George Williams	FW	1938	4	0	4	0	0	0	
(England) Steve Wooldridge	FB	1972	4	0	4	0	0	0	
(England) Richard Bourne	DF	1972–1973	3	1	4	0	0	0	
(England) Mark Nicholls	FW	2000	3	1	4	0	0	0	
(England) Blair Turgott	FW	2013	3	1	4	1	0	0	
(England) Marc Canham	MF	2002–2003	2	2	4	0	0	0	
(England) Charlie MacDonald	FW	2002	2	2	4	1	0	0	
(Jamaica) Jamal Campbell-Ryce	FW	2006 (Note: On loan from Rotherham United)	1	3	4	0	1	0	
(England) Tariq Issa	FW	2016–2017	1	3	4	0	0	0	
(Wales) Morrys Scott	FW	1990	1	3	4	0	0	0	
(England) Shawn McCoulsky	FW	2021–	0	4	4	1	0	0	
(England) Craig Oldfield	FW	1983–1984	0	4	4	0	0	0	
(England) Len Bond	GK	1976	3	0	3	0	0	0	
(Scotland) John Brown	HB	1962	3	0	3	0	0	0	
(England) Ken Burditt	FW	1939	3	0	3	0	0	0	
(England) David J Coleman	FW	1961–1962	3	0	3	1	0	0	
(England) Jimmy Collins	HB	1937–1938	3	0	3	0	0	0	
(England) Gary Culling	FB	1994	3	0	3	0	0	0	
(Wales) Aubrey Darmody	FB	1948	3	0	3	0	0	0	
(Wales) Graham Davies	GK	1949	3	0	3	0	0	0	
(England) Ray Dring	GK	1945	3	0	3	0	0	0	
(England) Jack Finch	FW	1946	3	0	3	0	0	0	
(England) George French	FB	1952–1953	3	0	3	0	0	0	
(England) Godfrey	FW	1945	3	0	3	0	0	0	
(England) Bob Gregg	FW	1945	3	0	3	1	0	0	
(Northern Ireland) Jim Hagan	DF	1989	3	0	3	0	0	0	
(England) Noel Kearney	FW	1964	3	0	3	0	0	0	
(Scotland) Bill Main	HB	1939	3	0	3	0	0	0	
(Scotland) David Nelson	HB	1945–1946	3	0	3	0	0	0	
(France) Franck Queudrue	FB	2010	3	0	3	0	0	0	
(Scotland) Alan Ross	FW	1946–1947	3	0	3	0	0	0	
(England) Barry Rowan	FW	1968	3	0	3	0	0	0	
(Nigeria) Efe Sodje	DF	2000	3	0	3	0	0	0	
(England) Paul Stoneman	DF	1994–1995 (Note: On loan from Blackpool)	3	0	3	1	0	0	
(England) Don Swift	DF	1946	3	0	3	0	0	0	
(England) Martin Williams	FW	1995	3	0	3	0	0	0	
(England) Sam Williams	FW	2008 (Note: On loan from Aston Villa)	3	0	3	1	0	0	
(England) Charlie Woods	DF	1971	3	0	3	0	0	0	
(Jamaica) Lloyd Doyley	DF	2016–2017	2	1	3	0	1	0	
(England) Paul Flowers	DF	1993	2	1	3	0	0	0	
(England) Tony Kelly	FW	1996	2	1	3	0	0	0	
(England) Ben Lewis	DF	1995	2	1	3	0	0	0	
(England) Josh Payne	MF	2009	2	1	3	0	1	0	
(England) Gerry Perryman	FB	1968	2	1	3	0	0	0	
(England) Alie Sesay	DF	2014	2	1	3	0	1	0	
(England) Femi Akinwande	FW	2016	1	2	3	0	0	0	
(England) Tony Cook	MF	1994	1	2	3	0	0	0	
(England) Chay Cooper	MF	2021–	1	2	3	0	0	0	
(Scotland) Bobby Roberts	MF	1973–1975	1	2	3	0	0	0	
(Wales) Casey Thomas	FW	2011	1	2	3	0	0	0	
(England) Justin Richards	FW	2002 (Note: On loan from Bristol Rovers)	0	3	3	0	1	0	
(England) Callum Roberts	WG	2019	0	3	3	0	0	0	
(England) Kemar Roofe	FW	2014	0	3	3	0	0	0	
(Iceland) Matthías Vilhjálmsson	FW	2011 (Note: On loan from FH)	0	3	3	0	0	0	
(England) Wilf Bott	FW	1946	2	0	2	0	0	0	
(England) Titus Bramble	DF	2000	2	0	2	0	2	0	
(England) James Bransgrove	GK	2016	2	0	2	0	0	0	
(Ireland) Bobby Browne	HB	1945	2	0	2	0	0	0	
(England) Dick Cullum	FW	1951–1954	2	0	2	1	0	0	
(England) Albert Day	FW	1945–1946	2	0	2	0	0	0	
(England) Keith Dublin	DF	1998	2	0	2	0	1	0	
(England) Glenn Ellis	GK	1977	2	0	2	0	0	0	
(England) H Fletcher	FW	1946	2	0	2	0	0	0	
(England) Cecil Green	FW	1945	2	0	2	0	0	0	
(England) Tommy Harris	FW	1953	2	0	2	0	0	0	
(England) John Jelly	GK	1946–1947	2	0	2	0	0	0	
(Scotland) Ian Johnstone	FW	1959	2	0	2	0	0	0	
(Wales) Charlie Jones	FB	1945–1946	2	0	2	0	0	0	
(Republic of Ireland) Des Kelly	GK	1972	2	0	2	0	0	0	
(Northern Ireland) Paddy Kernohan	FW	1945	2	0	2	0	0	0	
(England) John Leah	HB	1946–1947	2	0	2	0	0	0	
(England) Chris Lewington	GK	2014–2015	2	0	2	0	0	0	
(Scotland) Hamish McNeill	FW	1957	2	0	2	1	0	0	
(England) Alf Miller	HB	1948	2	0	2	0	0	0	
(England) Tony Miller	FW	1959–1964	2	0	2	0	0	0	
(England) Alasdair Monk	GK	1992	2	0	2	0	0	0	
(England) John Ormesher	DF	1937	2	0	2	0	0	0	
(England) Ken O'Rourke	FW	1968	2	0	2	0	0	0	
(Republic of Ireland) Conor Powell	FB	2011	2	0	2	0	0	0	
(Wales) Christian Ribeiro	FB	2010	2	0	2	0	0	0	
(England) Righton	FW	1946	2	0	2	1	0	0	
(England) Jackie Robinson	FW	1945	2	0	2	3	0	0	
(England) Bill Rochford	FB	1951	2	0	2	0	0	0	
(Scotland) John Roe	FB	1959	2	0	2	0	0	0	
(England) Dominic Samuel	FW	2013	2	0	2	0	0	0	
(England) Ernest Setchell	GK	1948	2	0	2	0	0	0	
(England) John Sims	FW	1975	2	0	2	0	0	0	
(England) Alf Smirk	FW	1945	2	0	2	1	0	0	
(Scotland) Tom Tobin	FW	1946	2	0	2	0	0	0	
(England) Trevor Whymark	FW	1985	2	0	2	0	0	0	
(Wales) Rod Williams	FW	1945	2	0	2	0	0	0	
(England) Justin Booty	FW	1994	1	1	2	0	0	0	
(England) Simon Gray	DF	1991	1	1	2	0	0	0	
(England) Lee Hills	FB	2008	1	1	2	0	0	0	
(England) Sammie McLeod	MF	2020	1	1	2	0	1	0	
(England) Danny Roberts	MF	1994	1	1	2	0	0	0	
(England) Billy Telford	FW	1976	1	1	2	1	0	0	
(England) Leighton Allen	FW	1994	0	2	2	0	0	0	
(Wales) Tom Bender	DF	2009–2010	0	2	2	0	0	0	
(England) Robert Boyce	MF	1995	0	2	2	0	0	0	
(England) Justin Gentle	FW	1994	0	2	2	0	0	0	
(England) Phil Hadland	MF	2003	0	2	2	0	0	0	
(Republic of Ireland) Wayne Hannigan	MF	1991	0	2	2	0	0	0	
(England) Andre Hasanally	MF	2019–	0	2	2	0	0	0	
(England) Izale McLeod	FW	2008	0	2	2	0	0	0	
(England) Nathan Oduwa	FW	2016	0	2	2	0	0	0	
(Ghana) Daniel Pappoe	DF	2013	0	2	2	0	0	1	
(England) Jordan Sanderson	MF	2011–2014	0	2	2	0	0	0	
(England) Jack Wignall	DF	1999	0	2	2	0	0	0	
(England) Andrews	FW	1945	1	0	1	0	0	0	
(England) Darren Angell	DF	1987	1	0	1	1	0	0	
(England) Harry Bamford	HB	1946	1	0	1	1	0	0	
(United States) Taylor Barada	GK	1994	1	0	1	0	0	0	
(England) Aaron Barnes	FB	2018	1	0	1	0	0	0	
(England) Mike Basham	DF	1993	1	0	1	0	0	0	
(England) Harry Beadle	DF	2021–	1	0	1	0	0	0	
(England) Albert Bennett	FW	1937	1	0	1	0	0	0	
(England) Beveridge	FW	1946	1	0	1	0	0	0	
(England) Bickmore	FW	1945	1	0	1	0	0	0	
(England) Bramhall	HB	1945	1	0	1	0	0	0	
(England) Garry Brooke	MF	1991	1	0	1	0	0	0	
(England) Buckley	FW	1945	1	0	1	0	0	0	
(Scotland) Jock Cameron	FW	1945	1	0	1	0	0	0	
(England) Ron Canham	FW	1945	1	0	1	0	0	0	
(England) George Coulson	DF	1946	1	0	1	0	0	0	
(England) Leo Cusenza	FB	1980	1	0	1	0	0	0	
(England) Jean Dalli	FB	1994	1	0	1	0	0	0	
(England) Peter Dawson	GK	1945	1	0	1	0	0	0	
(England) Mike Desborough	GK	1993 (Note: On loan from Chelmsford City)	1	0	1	0	0	0	
(England) Frank Dudley	FW	1946	1	0	1	2	0	0	
(England) Sean Duffett	FW	1991	1	0	1	0	0	0	
(Republic of Ireland) Austin Dunne	HB	1955	1	0	1	0	0	0	
(England) Len Duquemin	FW	1946	1	0	1	0	0	0	
(England) Geoff Fox	HB	1946	1	0	1	0	0	0	
(Brazil) Fumaça	MF	1999	1	0	1	0	0	0	
(England) Stan Gibbs	FW	1947	1	0	1	0	0	0	
(England) Jim Gotts	FW	1946	1	0	1	0	0	0	
(Scotland) Gray	HB	1945	1	0	1	0	0	0	
(England) Peter Hildyard	DF	1949	1	0	1	0	0	0	
(England) Hogg	FW	1946	1	0	1	0	0	0	
(England) Holmes	HB	1945	1	0	1	0	0	0	
(England) Cliff Hubbard	FW	1946	1	0	1	0	0	0	
(England) Billy Hunt	DF	1955	1	0	1	0	0	0	
(England) Fred Inskip	FW	1945	1	0	1	0	0	0	
(England) Alf Jefferies	GK	1946	1	0	1	0	0	0	
(England) Bill Jeffries	FW	1947	1	0	1	0	0	0	
(Wales) Leslie Jones	FW	1945	1	0	1	0	0	0	
(England) Richard Knight	GK	2002 (Note: On loan from Oxford United)	1	0	1	0	0	0	
(England) Trevor Lake	GK	1987	1	0	1	0	0	0	
(England) Colin Lundstrum	FW	1962	1	0	1	0	0	0	
(England) Tafari Moore	DF	2020	1	0	1	0	0	0	
(Scotland) Roddy Munro	FB	1946	1	0	1	0	0	0	
(England) Ernest Muttitt	FW	1946	1	0	1	0	0	0	
(England) Alfred Noble	FW	1955	1	0	1	0	0	0	
(England) Jon O'Donnell	FB	1975	1	0	1	0	0	0	
(Republic of Ireland) Michael O'Donoghue	DF	2014	1	0	1	0	0	0	
(England) O'Sullivan	DF	1945	1	0	1	0	0	0	
(United States) Will Packwood	DF	2014	1	0	1	0	0	1	
(England) Trevor Painter	DF	1970	1	0	1	0	0	0	
(Republic of Ireland) Paul Rooney	DF	2018	1	0	1	0	0	0	
(England) Ronnie Sales	DF	1949	1	0	1	0	0	0	
(England) John Sharpe	FW	1949	1	0	1	0	0	0	
(England) Sam Simnett	FW	1938	1	0	1	0	0	0	
(Scotland) Sid Smith	FW	1946	1	0	1	0	0	0	
(England) Stanyon	FW	1945	1	0	1	0	0	0	
(England) Ernest Steele	FW	1946	1	0	1	0	0	0	
(Scotland) Alex Stewart	FW	1946	1	0	1	1	0	0	
(England) John Sutton	FW	1946	1	0	1	3	0	0	
(England) Thompson	FW	1945	1	0	1	0	0	0	
(England) Len Townsend	FW	1946	1	0	1	3	0	0	
(England) Ben Tozer	DF	2013 (Note: On loan from Northampton Town)	1	0	1	0	0	0	
(England) Ron West	DF	1945	1	0	1	0	0	0	
(England) Johnny Westwood	FW	1946	1	0	1	1	0	0	
(England) Bill Wilkie	GK	1945	1	0	1	0	0	0	
(England) Harry Wilkinson	HB	1953	1	0	1	0	0	0	
(England) Jermaine Brown	FW	2003	0	1	1	1	0	0	
(England) David Buck	HB	1965	0	1	1	0	0	0	
(England) Triston Chambers	FW	2002	0	1	1	0	0	0	
(England) Sam Corcoran	MF	2009	0	1	1	0	0	0	
(England) Billy Cracknell	DF	2021–	0	1	1	0	0	0	
(England) Jack Curtis	MF	2015	0	1	1	0	0	0	
(Wales) Charley Edge	FW	2017	0	1	1	0	0	0	
(England) Keith Gorman	FW	1986	0	1	1	0	0	0	
(England) David Hadrava	FB	2001	0	1	1	0	0	0	
(England) Bradley Hamilton	DF	2012	0	1	1	0	0	0	
(England) Troy Hewitt	FW	2013	0	1	1	0	0	0	
(England) Conor Hubble	MF	2013	0	1	1	0	0	0	
(Australia) Richard Johnson	MF	2003	0	1	1	0	0	0	
(England) David Laitt	FB	1965	0	1	1	0	0	0	
(Scotland) Dave Lamont	MF	1967	0	1	1	0	0	0	
(England) Byron Lawrence	MF	2014	0	1	1	0	0	0	
(Republic of Ireland) Kenny McEvoy	MF	2015	0	1	1	0	0	0	
(England) Eoin McKeown	FW	2017	0	1	1	1	0	0	
(England) Todd Miller	WG	2019	0	1	1	0	0	0	
(Scotland) Grant Morrow	FW	1993	0	1	1	0	0	0	
(Nigeria) Sam Okafor	MF	1999	0	1	1	0	0	0	
(England) Dexter Peter	DF	2016	0	1	1	0	0	0	
(England) Geoff Pitcher	MF	1997	0	1	1	0	0	0	
(England) Dave Rainford	MF	1998	0	1	1	0	0	0	
(England) John Ray	DF	1988	0	1	1	0	0	0	
(England) Mark Rees	FW	1990	0	1	1	0	0	0	
(England) Dominic Smith	FW	2014	0	1	1	0	0	0	
(Wales) Mason Spence	FB	2013	0	1	1	0	0	0	
(England) Tom Stagg	FW	2021–	0	1	1	0	0	0	
(England) Martell Taylor-Crossdale	CF	2020	0	1	1	0	0	0	
(England) Tom Webb	FW	2007	0	1	1	0	0	0	
(England) Ian Wiles	DF	1998	0	1	1	0	0	0	
(England) Tony Wingate	MF	1972	0	1	1	0	0	0	
(England) Scott Young	FB	1986	0	1	1	0	0	0	
(England) Stuart Youngman	MF	1985	0	1	1	0	0	0	
