= Paul Dyer =

Paul Dyer may refer to:

- Paul Dyer (footballer) (born 1953), English footballer
- Paul Dyer (conductor), Australian musician, conductor and artistic director
