= Phil Henson =

English footballer

Personal information
- Full name: Philip Michael Henson
- Date of birth: 30 March 1953 (age 73)
- Place of birth: Manchester, England
- Height: 5 ft 10 in (1.78 m)
- Position: Midfielder

Senior career*
| Years | Team | Apps | (Gls) |
| 1971–1974 | Manchester City | 16 | (0) |
| 1973 | → Swansea City (loan) | 1 | (0) |
| 1974–1977 | Sheffield Wednesday | 73 | (9) |
| 1977–1978 | Sparta Rotterdam | 26 | (2) |
| 1978–1980 | Stockport County | 67 | (13) |
| 1980–1984 | Rotherham United | 92 | (7) |
| Total | | 275 | (31) |

Managerial career
- 1991–1994: Rotherham United
- * Club domestic league appearances and goals

Phil Henson (born 30 March 1953) is an English footballer, who played as a midfielder in the Football League for Manchester City, Swansea City, Sheffield Wednesday, Stockport County and Rotherham United. Henson made his league debut for Manchester City on 27th April 1974 against Manchester United at Old Trafford, a match remembered for Dennis Law's back heel winner which effectively ended the Trafford club's hopes of avoiding relegation to the second division.

He later managed Rotherham from 1991 to 1994.

== Honours ==
Rotherham United

- Football League Third Division: 1980–81
