= Terry Anderson (footballer) =

English footballer (1944–1980)

Personal information
- Full name: Terence Keith Anderson
- Date of birth: 11 March 1944
- Place of birth: Woking, England
- Date of death: c. 24 January 1980 (aged 35)
- Place of death: Great Yarmouth, England
- Height: 5 ft 9 in (1.75 m)
- Position: Winger

Youth career
- 1959–1962: Arsenal

Senior career*
Years	Team	Apps	(Gls)
1962–1965	Arsenal	25	(6)
1965–1974	Norwich City	236	(16)
1974	→ Colchester United (loan)	4	(0)
1974	Baltimore Comets	17	(0)
1974	Scunthorpe United	10	(0)
1974	Crewe Alexandra	4	(0)
1975	Baltimore Comets	19	(0)
1975–1976	Colchester United	16	(0)
Total		331	(22)
- * Club domestic league appearances and goals

Terence Keith Anderson (11 March 1944 – c. 24 January 1980) was an English footballer who played as a winger in the Football League, most notably for Norwich City, where he made 236 league appearances between 1965 and 1974.

Anderson made appearances for England at youth level prior to signing a professional deal with his first club, Arsenal. He additionally played for Colchester United in two spells, Scunthorpe United and Crewe Alexandra and also played in the United States for the short-lived NASL team Baltimore Comets over two seasons.

== Career ==
Born in Woking, Anderson joined Arsenal at the age of 15 in 1959, playing in the club's youth and reserve teams, and was at this time capped by England youth. Regarded by then-Arsenal manager Cliff Bastin [this is not correct - Bastin was never Arsenal manager] as one of the best left-wing prospects of his generation, he signed a professional deal in August 1961 and made his league debut for the Gunners in a 4–0 victory at West Ham United in March 1963. Anderson, who featured in the first-ever game televised on Match of the Day in August 1964, scored six goals in 26 league games for Arsenal before signing for Norwich City for £15,000 in February 1965.

During the 1971–72 campaign, in which Norwich gained promotion to the First Division for the first time, Anderson featured outside of his regular position in the centre of defence in the absence of captain Duncan Forbes through injury. He scored in City's first ever top flight victory over rivals Ipswich Town in a 2–1 win. He also played in every League Cup game on the road to the final at Wembley in the same season.

The following season saw Anderson join Colchester United on loan. Signed by Jim Smith as a temporary replacement for Paul Aimson, Anderson made four appearances and helped the club to promotion to the Third Division.

After leaving Norwich, having made 236 appearances and scored 16 goals, Anderson joined North American Soccer League team Baltimore Comets. He made 17 appearances in the 1974 season, providing four assists. He returned to England to play for Scunthorpe United and Crewe Alexandra during the off-season, making ten and four appearances respectively. He rejoined Baltimore for the 1975 season, making 19 appearances and providing one assist. The club folded in 1975 and Anderson once again returned to England to sign for Colchester United for a second spell.

Signed by Bobby Roberts prior to his first full season in charge, Anderson was a regular in the opening fixtures of the 1975–76 season, but he could not help prevent the club from being relegated to the Fourth Division. He made his final appearance in a 6–0 thrashing by Brighton and was released at the end of the season.

== Personal life ==
Following his retirement from playing, Anderson became the landlord of the Castle Hotel in Caister-on-Sea in Norfolk and worked in a sports shop.

== Death ==
Four years after playing his last game, on 24 January 1980, Anderson went on a training run in Great Yarmouth. He never returned from his run, and his body was found one week later having drowned at some point between this time. His exact date of death was never discovered.

== Honours ==
Norwich City

- Football League Second Division: 1971–72
- Football League Cup runner-up: 1972–73
