= Billy Telford =

English footballer

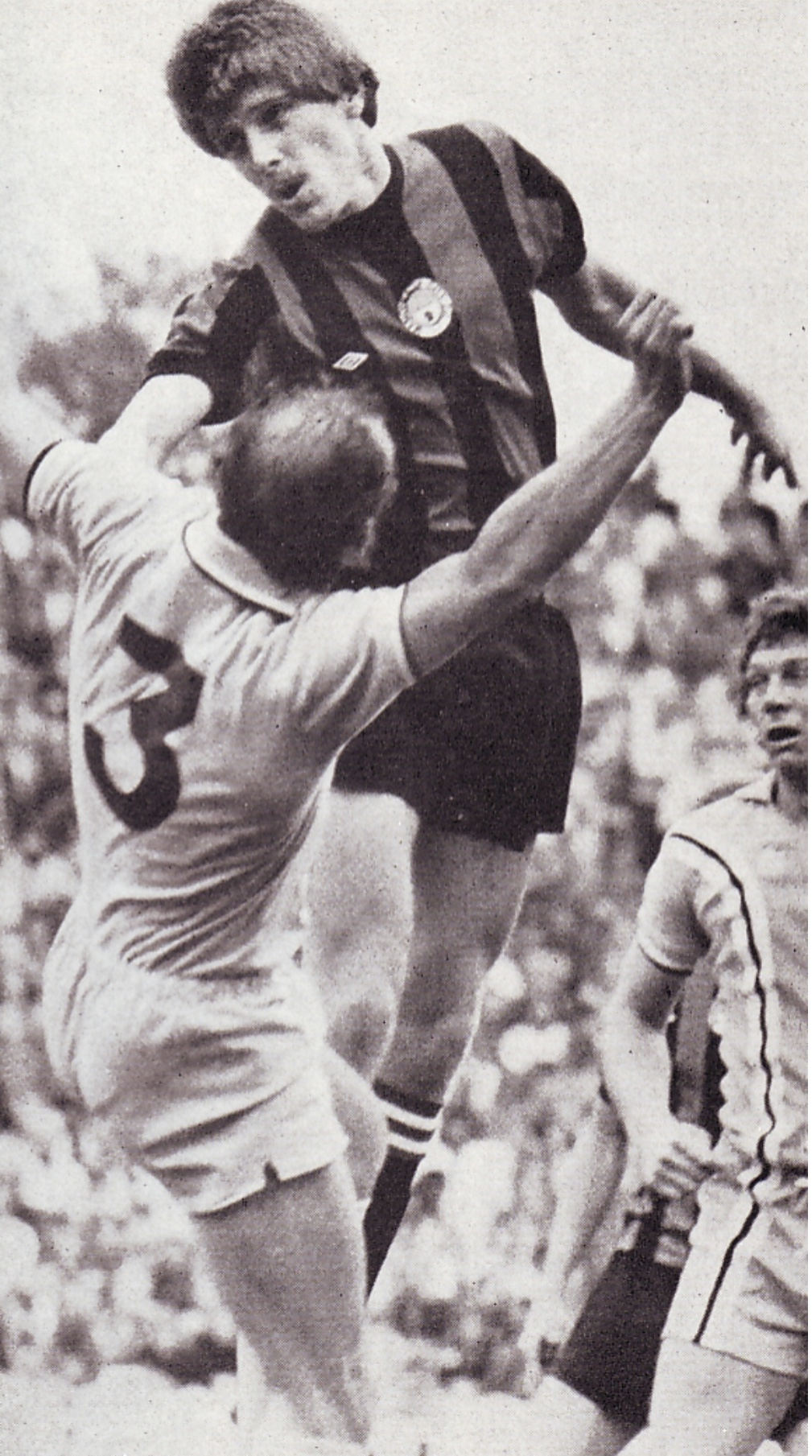
- Billy Telford playing for Manchester City in August 1975

Personal information
- Full name: William Albert Telford
- Date of birth: 5 March 1956 (age 70)
- Place of birth: Carlisle, England
- Position: Striker

Youth career
- 1971-1972: Cheshire Schoolboys
- 1971-1972: Christleton FC
- 1971-1974: Tranmere Rovers

Senior career*
Years	Team	Apps	(Gls)
1974-1975	Tranmere Rovers	0	(0)
1975	→ Burnley (loan)	0	(0)
1975	Manchester City	1	(0)
1975–1976	Peterborough United	4	(2)
1976	→ Colchester United (loan)	2	(1)
1976	→ Cork Hibs (loan)	3	(1)
1976	→ Crewe Alex (loan)	0	(0)
1976	Runcorn	14	(2)
1976-1977	Bangor City	22	(16)
1977	Ottawa Tigers	18	(23)
1977-1978	Bangor City		
1978	Ottawa Tigers		
1978-1980	Oswestry Town	57	(28)
1980-1981	Worcester City	30	(3)
1981–1982	Macclesfield Town	19	(5)
1982	→ Northwich Victoria (loan)	6	(1)
1982-1983	Oswestry Town		
Total		176	(82)
- * Club domestic league appearances and goals

William Albert Telford (born 5 March 1956) is an English former professional footballer who played as a forward. He played in the Football League for Manchester City, Peterborough United and Colchester United. He also played for Runcorn, Bangor City, Oswestry Town, Worcester City, Macclesfield Town and Nortwich Victoria in non-league football.

== Playing career ==
=== Tranmere Rovers ===
Billy signed for Tranmere Rovers as an apprentice when he was just 15 and a half years old in January 1971. He was then given his first professional contract on his 18th birthday in March 1974. Although Billy scored 47 goals in 1973/74 season & a further 35 goals in 1974/75 up to March '75 all for Tranmere Reserves he still couldn't get into a struggling Tranmere first team. Billy's own view on this was that the Tranmere manager at the time Ron Yeats told him "Goals aren't everything son".

In March 1975, whilst still on Tranmere books he had a 2-month loan with Burnley who were in the top half of the First Division at the time. Billy scored in his first appearance for Burnley Reserves and went on to score 10 goals in 12 matches for them in The Central League but didn't get to make a first team appearance. At the end of the 2-month loan manager Jimmy Adamson told Telford that Burnley would not require his services.

Billy was then released from Tranmere Rovers at the end of 1974/75 season following their relegation to the Fourth Division.

=== Manchester City ===
Following being released by Tranmere Rovers after their relegation Billy Telford joined Manchester City in June 1975 as a trialist. Billy made his debut in the Anglo-Scottish Cup a new cup tournament for teams in England and Scotland replacing the Texaco Cup. The game was at home against Sheffield United, of which, Billy started and Man City won 3–1. Centre Back David Watson who was a new signing in the summer for the Blues from Sunderland also made his home debut in this game. Billy came off 10 minutes before the end to a home crowd standing ovation and a big hug from manager Tony Book.

Two days later Billy made his second appearance in a Manchester City shirt. This time it was a friendly against Northern Premier League side Macclesfield Town. Although the Man City side included some youngsters like Paul Power making his first senior start City were still expected to easily win. However, the Blues struggled in front of goal and it was left to Billy Telford to spare City's blushes and got the equaliser in the 76th minute. The game finished 1–1.

Billy made his third and final appearance for Manchester City in what was to be his only English First Division league game. It was on 23 August 1975 away at Coventry City. Billy started the game on the bench but came on in the 12th minute for the injured Joe Royle.

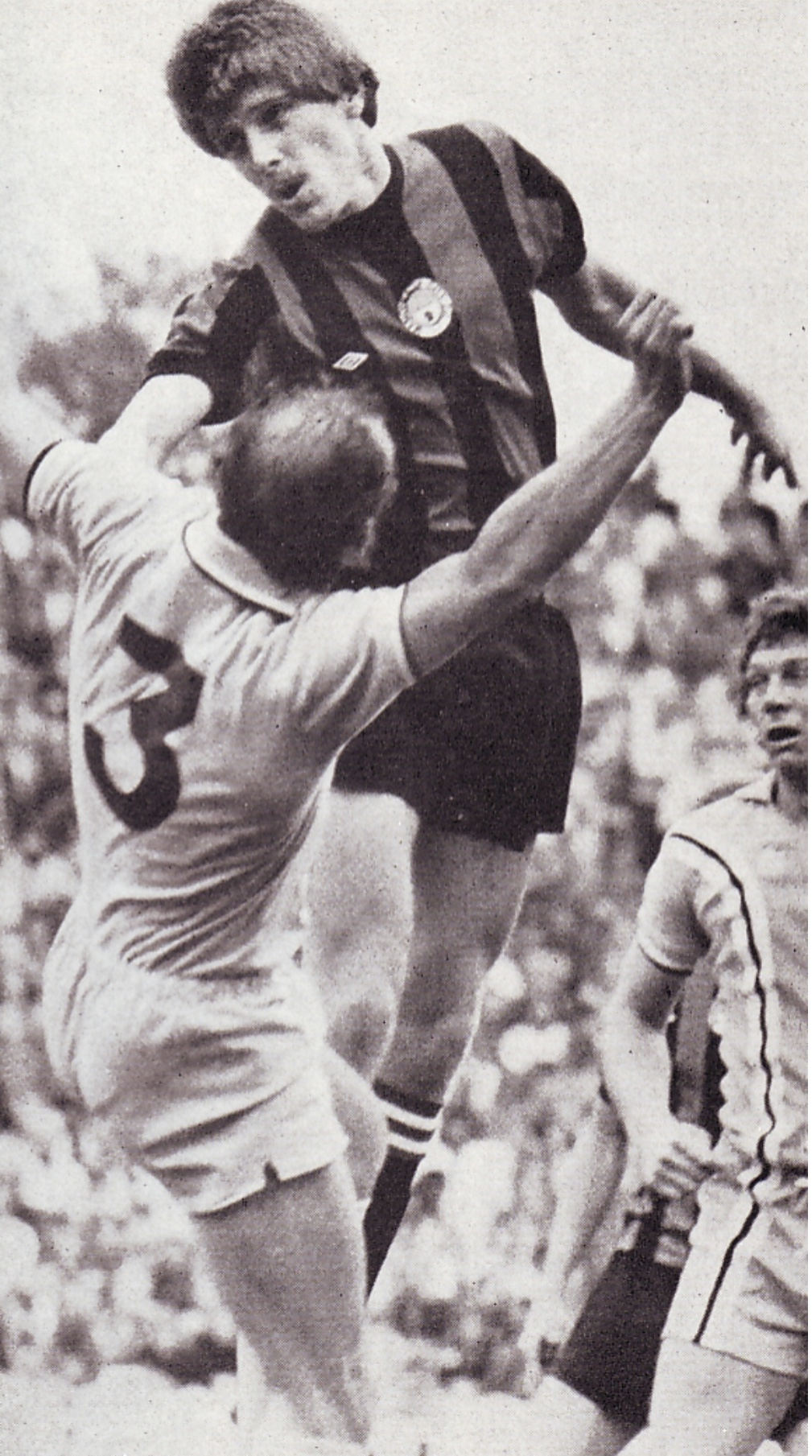

In the profile picture Billy Telford is captured during the game against Coventry City where he leaps above Jim Brogan to win the ball. John Craven of Coventry can also be seen in the photo. Coventry City won the game 2–0 with two goals from Alan Green in injury time of both halves. Telford thought he had done enough to earn a permanent contract but at the end of August manager Tony Book pulled Billy into his office and said "Sorry Billy, there's nothing i can offer you, but play well in the reserves against Blackpool because there are a lot of clubs coming to look at you" So Billy's trial at Manchester City was not made permanent and in September 1975 he was signed by Noel Cantwell manager for Peterborough United who were playing in the Third Division at the time.

At the end of the season Manchester City finished 8th in the First Division and won the League Cup

=== Peterborough United ===
Noel Cantwell the former Manchester United & Ireland full back signed Billy in September 1975

Billy scored with his first touch on his debut at home against Aldershot on 13 September 1975. Billy came on at half time for Alan Merrick who was on loan from West Brom and 13 seconds after the restart scored to give The Posh a 1–0 lead Jack Howarth later equalized and the game finished 1–1. Neil Warnock was also playing on the wing that day for Aldershot.

Billy then started the next 3 matches a 1–1 draw away at Chester City; a 2–0 home win against Wrexham and a 3–1 home defeat to Rotherhamof which Billy got his second goal for The Posh and gave the home team a 1–0 lead at half time. Billy then was an unused sub away at Sheffield Wednesday and after that was out of favour with the manager and not picked in the first team match day squad again.

Peterborough finished 10th in the Third Division and made the FA Cup 4th Rnd before losing away to Manchester United 3–1.

=== Colchester United ===
After spending a couple of months playing in the Peterborough reserves Billy went out on loan at the end of January 1976 on a 1-month loan deal to Colchester United who like Peterborough United were also playing in the Third Division. Again Billy made an instant impact and scored in the third minute of his debut at home to Hereford United. It was to no avail and Colchester lost 4–1. In Billy's second and last appearance for Colchester he came off the bench but failed to get the equalizer and they lost 3–2 at home to Chesterfield.

Billy's 1-month loan at Layer Road was not extended and returned to Peterborough. At the end of the season Colchester were relegated to the Fourth Division.

=== Cork Hibs ===
So Billy went out on loan again this time to Cork Hibs where his former Man City teammate Rodney Marsh had also played a handful of games for earlier in the season. Billy again did just 1 month at Cork and scored once in 3 appearances. Cork Hibs folded at the end of the season.

=== Crewe Alex ===
Following his return from Cork Billy then went on a third loan for the season this time at Crewe Alex. Billy failed to make any kind of impression with Crewe manager Harry Gregg during his 1 month with the club and didn't get to make a single first team appearance.

=== Runcorn ===
In May 1976 after being released again this time by Peterborough Billy decided than rather drag himself around the football league he would get some security, so joined a joinery course at government training centre in Runcorn and was living in Neston, Cheshire at the time. Living locally Billy signed for non league side Runcorn in August 1976. Runcorn had just won the Northern Premier League in the 1975/76 season. Billy was a regular first team player from August to November then asked to be placed on the transfer list. Billy's last game was for Runcorn Reserves in December 1976 when they beat his former team Christleton FC 6-1 and Billy scored all six goals.

=== Bangor City ===
In December 1976 Billy signed for Bangor City in the Northern Premier League. Billy scored on his debut on boxing day in a 4–1 home win against South Liverpool. Bangor City were managed by player manager Dave Elliott, a former Sunderland and Newcastle United midfielder.

Billy was finally getting a regular first team game and repaid the faith shown in him by Elliot by scoring 20 goals for the club, 16 of which came in the league from joining at Christmas to the end of April.

Bangor finished the season 4th in the league their highest ever placing since joining the Northern Premier League in 1968 and were the second highest scorers in the league with 87 goals. Billy missed the last few league games of the season as he signed for Ottawa Tigers in the National Soccer League.

=== Ottawa Tigers ===
Billy Telford played abroad in the National Soccer League with Ottawa Tigers and made his CNSL debut in Ottawa Tigers' opening game of the 1977 season on 15 May. Billy was one of the goalscorers in the 3–0 win over Mississauga Hungaria in front of 800 fans at Lansdowne Park in Ottawa.

On Sunday 5 June Billy scored four goals in Ottawa Tigers' 8–1 win over Bradford Marshlanders in Bradford, Ontario in the National Soccer League. By the end of June Billy was Tigers' leading goalscorer with nine goals.

Billy ended the season as the leading goalscorer in the CNSL Second Division with 25 goals. He scored 23 goals in the regular league season and added two more in the playoffs. Ottawa Tigers' win in the playoffs earned them promotion to the CNSL First Division. Billy then rejoined Bangor City when the Canadian season ended in October 1977.
