= Derek Harrison (footballer) =

English footballer

Personal information
- Full name: Derek Harrison
- Date of birth: 9 February 1950 (age 76)
- Place of birth: Littlethorpe, England
- Position: Defender

Youth career
- Blaby Boys Club
- 1965–1967: Leicester City

Senior career*
Years	Team	Apps	(Gls)
1967–1971	Leicester City	0	(0)
1971–1975	Torquay United	127	(4)
1975–1976	Colchester United	7	(0)
- Dawlish Town
1976–	Salisbury		(1)
Total		134	(4)
- * Club domestic league appearances and goals

Derek Harrison (born 9 February 1950) is an English former footballer who played in the Football League as a defender for Torquay United and Colchester United. He began his career at Leicester City, where he failed to make a league appearance but played in two League Cup games. He later represented Dawlish Town and Salisbury City.

== Career ==
Born in Littlethorpe, near Leicester, Harrison started his footballing career with Blaby Boys Club, before joining Leicester City and signing a professional contract with the club in 1967. He spent four years as a professional at Filbert Street and made his debut for the first-team in a League Cup second round replay tie on 10 September 1969, resulting in a 0–0 draw against Bristol City. He made his second and final appearance for the club in another League Cup game just over one year later on 7 October 1970, a 1–1 third round draw with Bolton Wanderers.

In search of regular first-team football, Harrison moved to Torquay United in February 1971, where he played 127 league games for the club over four years, scoring four goals.

Harrison moved on to play for Colchester United in the summer of 1975, making his debut on 16 August 1975 in a Third Division 2–1 defeat at Preston North End. He played seven league games for the U's in his short spell with the club, making his final appearance on 7 February 1976 in a 3–2 home defeat to Chesterfield.

After leaving Colchester, Harrison went on to represent Dawlish Town and Salisbury City in the English non-leagues.
