= 1954–55 Colchester United F.C. season =

Colchester United
1954–55 season
- Chairman: Bill Allen
- Manager: Jack Butler (until 14 January); Alf Miller & Claude Orrin (January to March); Benny Fenton (from March)
- Stadium: Layer Road
- Third Division South: 24th (re-elected)
- FA Cup: 1st round (eliminated by Reading)
- Top goalscorer: League: Ken Plant (13); All: Ken Plant (13)
- Highest home attendance: 10,809 v Southend United, 8 April 1955
- Lowest home attendance: 3,517 v Torquay United, 31 March 1955
- Average home league attendance: 7,284
- Biggest win: 4–1 v Northampton Town, 4 September 1954
- Biggest defeat: 1–6 v Northampton Town, 18 April 1955
Home colours

The 1954–55 season was Colchester United's 13th season in their history and their fifth season in the Third Division South, the third tier of English football. Alongside competing in the Third Division South, the club also participated in the FA Cup. Following a replay, Colchester were knocked out of the FA Cup in the first round by Reading. Meanwhile, in the league, Colchester's poor run of form had Jack Butler allowed indefinite leave following a bout of ill health. After resigning in January 1955, Colchester appointed Benny Fenton as his replacement, and despite an upturn in form, a run of defeats at the end of the season meant Colchester needed to apply for re-election for the second successive season. Once more, all clubs applying for re-election were successful, with Colchester receiving 44 votes, behind Third Division North clubs Grimsby Town (49 votes) and Chester City (47 votes), but eleven votes ahead of division rivals Walsall.

== Season overview ==
Eight successive league defeats from October to December saw Colchester bottom of the league for Christmas Day, and the plight of the club had begun to have an effect on the health of manager Jack Butler. After falling ill in November, Butler was handed indefinite leave until by the club until the end of his contract in 1956. Suffering from a mental breakdown, Butler eventually resigned on 14 January 1955, while club secretary Claude Orrin was charged with finding a new manager.

During this transitional period, Orrin and Alf Miller took charge of the first-team, before appointing Benny Fenton as manager after attracting 48 applications for the vacancy. Despite a brief boost in on-field fortunes in March and early April, performances tailed off as Colchester picked up just one point in the final eight games of the campaign. The club finished bottom of the Football League and were again required to seek re-election, in which they were successful.

== Players ==
As of match played 4 May 1955.

Name	Position	Nationality	Place of birth	Date of birth	Apps	Goals	Signed from	Date signed	Fee
Goalkeepers
George Wright	GK	(England)	Plymouth	10 October 1919 (aged 34)	205	0	(England) Plymouth Argyle	May 1949	£1,000
John Wright	GK	(England)	Aldershot	13 August 1933 (aged 20)	0	0	(England) Colchester Casuals	23 May 1952	Free transfer
Defenders
Roy Bicknell	CB	(England)	Doncaster	19 February 1926 (aged 28)	29	0	(England) Gravesend & Northfleet	June 1952	£1,000
George French	FB	(England)	Colchester	10 November 1926 (aged 27)	3	0	(England) West Ham United	February 1949	Free transfer
John Harrison	FB	(England)	Leicester	27 September 1927 (aged 26)	170	0	(England) Aston Villa	30 September 1950 (Note: Date of signing refers to the date of the player's first game for the club)	Nominal
Billy Hunt	CB	(England)	Colchester	25 November 1934 (aged 19)	0	0	Amateur	August 1953	Free transfer
Digger Kettle	FB	(England)	Colchester	3 June 1922 (aged 31)	172	1	(England) Arclight Sports	September 1946	Free transfer
Fred Lewis	FB	(England)	Broughton Gifford	26 July 1923 (aged 30)	48	0	(England) Chelsea	Summer 1953	Free transfer
Reg Stewart	CB	(England)	Sheffield	30 October 1925 (aged 28)	218	0	(England) Sheffield Wednesday	20 August 1949	£1,000
Midfielders
Bob Dale	WH	(England)	Irlam	31 October 1931 (aged 22)	21	4	(England) Bury	24 December 1953	£1,500
Austin Dunne	WH	(Republic of Ireland)	Limerick	31 July 1934 (aged 19)	0	0	(Republic of Ireland) Limerick	October 1953	Free transfer
Jimmy Elder	WH	(Scotland)	Scone	5 March 1928 (aged 26)	182	14	(England) Portsmouth	19 August 1950	£1,000
Benny Fenton	WH	(England)	West Ham	10 October 1918 (aged 35)	0	0	(England) Charlton Athletic	5 March 1955	£500
Trevor Harris	WH	(England)	Colchester	6 February 1936 (aged 18)	0	0	Amateur	July 1951	Free transfer
Bert Hill	WH	(England)	West Ham	8 March 1930 (aged 24)	17	1	(England) Chelsea	September 1952	£300
Ron Hunt	WH	(England)	Colchester	26 September 1933 (aged 20)	5	0	Amateur	October 1951	Free transfer
Forwards
Cliff Birch	WG	(Wales)	Newport	1 September 1928 (aged 25)	0	0	(Wales) Newport County	June 1954	£1,000
Mike Grice	WG	(England)	Woking	3 November 1931 (aged 22)	31	3	(England) Lowestoft Town	Summer 1952	£25
Paddy Leonard	IF	(Republic of Ireland)	Dublin	25 July 1929 (aged 24)	0	0	(England) Bristol Rovers	July 1954	Free transfer
Kevin McCurley	CF	(England)	Consett	2 April 1926 (aged 28)	92	34	(England) Liverpool	June 1951	£750
Johnny McKim	IF	(Scotland)	Greenock	22 January 1926 (aged 28)	103	39	(England) Chelsea	19 August 1950	£1,000
Ken Plant	CF	(England)	Nuneaton	15 August 1925 (aged 28)	17	6	(England) Bury	January 1954	Undisclosed
Peter Wright	WG	(England)	Colchester	26 January 1934 (aged 20)	44	4	Amateur	November 1951	Free transfer

== Transfers ==
=== In ===
Date	Position	Nationality	Name	From	Fee	Ref.
Summer 1954	GK	(Scotland)	Jimmy Kirk	(England) Bury	Free transfer	
Summer 1954	FB	(England)	Ron George	(England) Crystal Palace	Free transfer	
June 1954	WH	(Northern Ireland)	Frank McCourt	(England) Manchester City	Nominal	
June 1954	WG	(Wales)	Cliff Birch	(Wales) Newport County	£1,000	
July 1954	IF	(Republic of Ireland)	Paddy Leonard	(England) Bristol Rovers	Free transfer	
5 March 1955	WH	(England)	Benny Fenton	(England) Charlton Athletic	£500	(Note: Date of signing refers to the date of the player's first game for the club)

- Total spending: ▼ ~ £1,500

=== Out ===
Date	Position	Nationality	Name	To	Fee	Ref.
Summer 1954	GK	(England)	Frank Coombs	(England) Gravesend & Northfleet	Released	
Summer 1954	WH	(England)	Doug Keene	(England) Dartford	Released	
Summer 1954	WG	(England)	John Church	(England) Crittall Athletic	Released	
31 May 1954	WH	(England)	Harry Bearryman	(England) Metropolitan Police	Free transfer	
6 November 1954	WG	(England)	Peter Aitchison	(England) Sittingbourne	Free transfer	(Note: Date of departure refers to the date of the player's final game for the club)
5 February 1955	FB	(England)	Ron George	(England) Sudbury Town	Free transfer	
19 February 1955	WH	(Northern Ireland)	Frank McCourt	(England) Poole Town	Released	
28 April 1955	GK	(Scotland)	Jimmy Kirk	(England) Torquay United	Free transfer	

== Match details ==
=== Third Division South ===
==== Results round by round ====
Round	1	2	3	4	5	6	7	8	9	10	11	12	13	14	15	16	17	18	19	20	21	22	23	24	25	26	27	28	29	30	31	32	33	34	35	36	37	38	39	40	41	42	43	44	45	46
Ground	H	A	A	H	H	H	A	A	H	H	A	A	H	H	A	H	A	H	A	A	H	A	A	H	H	A	H	A	H	A	A	H	A	H	A	H	H	H	A	A	H	A	A	H	H	A
Result	D	D	D	L	W	L	L	L	D	W	L	W	W	L	L	L	L	L	L	L	L	D	D	D	W	W	L	L	W	D	D	W	D	D	L	L	D	W	L	L	L	L	L	D	L	L
Position	14	13	15	19	11	16	19	20	20	18	22	19	14	18	19	21	23	23	23	23	23	23	23	23	23	21	22	23	23	23	22	21	21	22	23	23	23	22	23	23	23	23	24	24	24	24

Source: 11v11.com
A = Away; H = Home; W = Win; D = Draw; L = Loss

==== League table ====
Pos	Team	Pld	W	D	L	GF	GA	GAv	Pts	Promotion or relegation
20	Crystal Palace	46	11	16	19	52	80	0.650	38	
21	Swindon Town	46	11	15	20	46	64	0.719	37	
22	Exeter City	46	11	15	20	47	73	0.644	37	
23	Walsall	46	10	14	22	75	86	0.872	34	Re-elected
24	Colchester United	46	9	13	24	53	91	0.582	31	Re-elected

Source: rsssf.com

==== Matches ====
21 August 1954 1	Colchester United	0–0	Swindon Town	Colchester
		Report; Report		Stadium: Layer Road; Attendance: 9,767

25 August 1954 2	Exeter City	2–2	Colchester United	Exeter
	Houghton 1'; Ellaway 25'	Report	Leonard 16'; Grice 33'	Stadium: St James Park; Attendance: 9,320

28 August 1954 3	Crystal Palace	0–0	Colchester United	Selhurst
		Report		Stadium: Selhurst Park; Attendance: 14,348

2 September 1954 4	Colchester United	1–2	Exeter City	Colchester
	Plant	Report	Unknown goalscorer	Stadium: Layer Road; Attendance: 7,963

4 September 1954 5	Colchester United	4–1	Northampton Town	Colchester
	Birch; Plant	Report	Unknown goalscorer	Stadium: Layer Road; Attendance: 7,467

9 September 1954 6	Colchester United	0–2	Bristol City	Colchester
		Report	Unknown goalscorer	Stadium: Layer Road; Attendance: 8,522

11 September 1954 7	Watford	2–0	Colchester United	Watford
	Bowie; Cook	Report		Stadium: Vicarage Road; Attendance: 13,794

14 September 1954 8	Bristol City	4–0	Colchester United	Bristol
	Unknown goalscorer	Report		Stadium: Ashton Gate Stadium; Attendance: 18,455

18 September 1954 9	Colchester United	3–3	Bournemouth & Boscombe Athletic	Colchester
	Dale; Plant; Grice	Report	Unknown goalscorer	Stadium: Layer Road; Attendance: 7,801

23 September 1954 10	Colchester United	1–0	Norwich City	Colchester
	Dale	Report		Stadium: Layer Road; Attendance: 8,506

25 September 1954 11	Queens Park Rangers	4–1	Colchester United	Shepherd's Bush
	Unknown goalscorer	Report	Birch	Stadium: Loftus Road; Attendance: 11,738

29 September 1954 12	Norwich City	0–2	Colchester United	Norwich
		Report	Dale; Plant	Stadium: Carrow Road; Attendance: 15,672

2 October 1954 13	Colchester United	1–0	Newport County	Colchester
	McKim	Report		Stadium: Layer Road; Attendance: 8,691

9 October 1954 14	Colchester United	2–4	Brighton & Hove Albion	Colchester
	McKim; Plant (pen.)	Report	Foreman; Gordon; Mundy	Stadium: Layer Road; Attendance: 9,334

16 October 1954 15	Brentford	3–2	Colchester United	Brentford
	Robertson; Stobbart; Rainford	Report	McKim; Grice	Stadium: Griffin Park; Attendance: 10,218

23 October 1954 16	Colchester United	0–1	Coventry City	Colchester
		Report	Capel	Stadium: Layer Road; Attendance: 8,124

30 October 1954 17	Walsall	3–1	Colchester United	Walsall
	Unknown goalscorer	Report	McKim	Stadium: Fellows Park; Attendance: 11,117

6 November 1954 18	Colchester United	0–2	Millwall	Colchester
		Report	Prior; Pacey	Stadium: Layer Road; Attendance: 7,551

13 November 1954 19	Leyton Orient	2–0	Colchester United	Leyton
	Unknown goalscorer	Report		Stadium: Brisbane Road; Attendance: 16,782

27 November 1954 20	Reading	4–0	Colchester United	Reading
	Unknown goalscorer	Report		Stadium: Elm Park; Attendance: 6,512

4 December 1954 21	Colchester United	2–4	Shrewsbury Town	Colchester
	Plant; P. Wright	Report	Unknown goalscorer	Stadium: Layer Road; Attendance: 5,168

18 December 1954 22	Swindon Town	1–1	Colchester United	Swindon
	McClelland	Report; Report	Plant	Stadium: County Ground; Attendance: 5,254

25 December 1954 23	Aldershot	2–2	Colchester United	Aldershot
	Unknown goalscorer	Report	McKim; P. Wright	Stadium: Recreation Ground; Attendance: 5,123

27 December 1954 24	Colchester United	1–1	Aldershot	Colchester
	P. Wright	Report	Unknown goalscorer	Stadium: Layer Road; Attendance: 7,967

1 January 1955 25	Colchester United	2–0	Crystal Palace	Colchester
	Plant; P. Wright	Report		Stadium: Layer Road; Attendance: 5,806

8 January 1955 26	Southampton	0–1	Colchester United	Southampton
		Report	Grice	Stadium: The Dell; Attendance: 12,449

22 January 1955 27	Colchester United	1–3	Watford	Colchester
	Grice	Report	Adams; Cook; Paton	Stadium: Layer Road; Attendance: 4,729

5 February 1955 28	Bournemouth & Boscombe Athletic	2–0	Colchester United	Bournemouth
	Unknown goalscorer	Report		Stadium: Dean Court; Attendance: 7,417

12 February 1955 29	Colchester United	1–0	Queens Park Rangers	Colchester
	Leonard	Report		Stadium: Layer Road; Attendance: 4,903

19 February 1955 30	Newport County	0–0	Colchester United	Newport
		Report		Stadium: Somerton Park; Attendance: 5,612

26 February 1955 31	Brighton & Hove Albion	1–1	Colchester United	Hove
	Moore	Report	Dale	Stadium: Goldstone Ground; Attendance: 11,074

5 March 1955 32	Colchester United	3–2	Brentford	Colchester
	Elder (pen.); Plant; Leonard	Report	Francis; Dudley	Stadium: Layer Road; Attendance: 8,251

12 March 1955 33	Coventry City	0–0	Colchester United	Coventry
		Report		Stadium: Highfield Road; Attendance: 10,058

19 March 1955 34	Colchester United	2–2	Walsall	Colchester
	Grice; P. Wright	Report	Unknown goalscorer	Stadium: Layer Road; Attendance: 7,361

26 March 1955 35	Millwall	5–2	Colchester United	New Cross
	Summers; Pacey; Hazlett; Short	Report	Leonard; P. Wright	Stadium: The Den; Attendance: 8,349

31 March 1955 36	Colchester United	0–2	Torquay United	Colchester
		Report	Unknown goalscorer	Stadium: Layer Road; Attendance: 3,517

2 April 1955 37	Colchester United	2–2	Leyton Orient	Colchester
	Fenton 39'; Plant 58'	Report	Rees 6', 75'	Stadium: Layer Road; Attendance: 9,448

8 April 1955 38	Colchester United	2–0	Southend United	Colchester
	Fenton 18'; Stewart 23'	Report; Report		Stadium: Layer Road; Attendance: 10,809

9 April 1955 39	Gillingham	2–1	Colchester United	Gillingham
	Unknown goalscorer	Report	Elder (pen.)	Stadium: Priestfield Stadium; Attendance: 11,002

11 April 1955 40	Southend United	4–2	Colchester United	Southend-on-Sea
	Grant; Hollis	Report; Report	McKim; Leonard	Stadium: Roots Hall; Attendance: 8,478

16 April 1955 41	Colchester United	0–2	Reading	Colchester
		Report	Unknown goalscorer	Stadium: Layer Road; Attendance: 7,046

18 April 1955 42	Northampton Town	6–1	Colchester United	Northampton
	Unknown goalscorer Elder (o.g.); Harrison (o.g.)	Report	McKim	Stadium: County Ground; Attendance: 3,198

23 April 1955 43	Shrewsbury Town	2–0	Colchester United	Shrewsbury
	Unknown goalscorer	Report		Stadium: Gay Meadow; Attendance: 6,735

28 April 1955 44	Colchester United	2–2	Gillingham	Colchester
	P. Wright	Report	Unknown goalscorer	Stadium: Layer Road; Attendance: 5,070

30 April 1955 45	Colchester United	3–5	Southampton	Colchester
	Plant; McCurley; P. Wright	Report	Brown; Hoskins; Mulgrew; Day; Walker	Stadium: Layer Road; Attendance: 6,386

4 May 1955 46	Torquay United	2–1	Colchester United	Torquay
	Unknown goalscorer	Report	Birch	Stadium: Plainmoor; Attendance: 2,907

=== FA Cup ===
20 November 1954 1st round	Reading	3–3	Colchester United	Reading
	Wheeler 36'; Uphill 40'; Hill (o.g.)	Report	Birch 21'; Grice 28'; McKim 73'	Stadium: Elm Park; Attendance: 12,800

25 November 1954 1st round replay	Colchester United	1–2	Reading	Colchester
	Elder (pen.)	Report	Unknown goalscorer	Stadium: Layer Road; Attendance: 4,636

== Squad statistics ==
=== Appearances and goals ===
No.	Pos	Nat	Player	Total		Third Division South		FA Cup	
No.	Pos	Nat	Player	Apps	Goals	Apps	Goals	Apps	Goals
	GK	(England) ENG	George Wright	14	0	12	0	2	0
	GK	(England) ENG	John Wright	2	0	2	0	0	0
	DF	(England) ENG	John Harrison	35	0	35	0	0	0
	DF	(England) ENG	Digger Kettle	2	0	2	0	0	0
	DF	(England) ENG	Fred Lewis	41	0	39	0	2	0
	DF	(England) ENG	Reg Stewart	47	1	45	1	2	0
	MF	(England) ENG	Bob Dale	34	4	34	4	0	0
	MF	(Republic of Ireland) IRL	Austin Dunne	1	0	1	0	0	0
	MF	(Scotland) SCO	Jimmy Elder	30	3	28	2	2	1
	MF	(England) ENG	Benny Fenton	11	2	11	2	0	0
	MF	(England) ENG	Trevor Harris	1	0	1	0	0	0
	MF	(England) ENG	Bert Hill	21	0	19	0	2	0
	MF	(England) ENG	Ron Hunt	26	0	26	0	0	0
	FW	(Wales) WAL	Cliff Birch	14	4	12	3	2	1
	FW	(England) ENG	Mike Grice	40	7	38	6	2	1
	FW	(Republic of Ireland) IRL	Paddy Leonard	34	5	34	5	0	0
	FW	(England) ENG	Kevin McCurley	18	1	16	1	2	0
	FW	(Scotland) SCO	Johnny McKim	34	8	32	7	2	1
	FW	(England) ENG	Ken Plant	42	13	40	13	2	0
	FW	(England) ENG	Peter Wright	23	9	23	9	0	0
Players who appeared for Colchester who left during the season
	GK	(Scotland) SCO	Jimmy Kirk	32	0	32	0	0	0
	DF	(England) ENG	Ron George	8	0	6	0	2	0
	MF	(Northern Ireland) NIR	Frank McCourt	12	0	12	0	0	0
	FW	(England) ENG	Peter Aitchison	6	0	6	0	0	0

=== Goalscorers ===
Place	Nationality	Position	Name	Third Division South	FA Cup	Total
1	(England)	CF	Ken Plant	13	0	13
2	(England)	WG	Peter Wright	9	0	9
3	(Scotland)	IF	Johnny McKim	7	1	8
4	(England)	WG	Mike Grice	6	1	7
5	(Republic of Ireland)	IF	Paddy Leonard	5	0	5
6	(Wales)	WG	Cliff Birch	3	1	4
6	(England)	WH	Bob Dale	4	0	4
8	(Scotland)	WH	Jimmy Elder	2	1	3
9	(England)	WH	Benny Fenton	2	0	2
10	(England)	CF	Kevin McCurley	1	0	1
10	(England)	CB	Reg Stewart	1	0	1
			Own goals	0	0	0
			TOTALS	53	4	57

=== Clean sheets ===
Number of games goalkeepers kept a clean sheet.

Place	Nationality	Player	Third Division South	FA Cup	Total
1	(Scotland)	Jimmy Kirk	7	0	7
2	(England)	George Wright	4	0	4
		TOTALS	11	0	11

=== Player debuts ===
Players making their first-team Colchester United debut in a fully competitive match.

Position	Nationality	Player	Date	Opponent	Ground	Notes
GK	(Scotland)	Jimmy Kirk	21 August 1954	Swindon Town	Layer Road	
WH	(Northern Ireland)	Frank McCourt	21 August 1954	Swindon Town	Layer Road	
WG	(Wales)	Cliff Birch	21 August 1954	Swindon Town	Layer Road	
IF	(Republic of Ireland)	Paddy Leonard	21 August 1954	Swindon Town	Layer Road	
FB	(England)	Ron George	16 October 1954	Brentford	Griffin Park	
WH	(England)	Benny Fenton	5 March 1955	Brentford	Layer Road	
WH	(Republic of Ireland)	Austin Dunne	9 April 1955	Gillingham	Priestfield	
WH	(England)	Trevor Harris	18 April 1955	Northampton Town	County Ground	
GK	(England)	John Wright	30 April 1955	Southampton	Layer Road	

== See also ==
- List of Colchester United F.C. seasons
