= 1953–54 Colchester United F.C. season =

Colchester United
1953–54 season
- Chairman: Bill Allen
- Manager: Ron Meades (11 June to 15 June); Jack Butler (from 16 June)
- Stadium: Layer Road
- Third Division South: 23rd (re-elected)
- FA Cup: 1st round (eliminated by Millwall)
- Top goalscorer: League: Bert Barlow (10); All: Bert Barlow (10)
- Highest home attendance: 10,316 v Ipswich Town, 19 December 1953
- Lowest home attendance: 6,035 v Southend United, 29 April 1954
- Average home league attendance: 7,797
- Biggest win: 5–0 v Queens Park Rangers, 25 December 1953
- Biggest defeat: 0–4 v Millwall, 23 November 1953
Home colours

The 1953–54 season was Colchester United's twelfth season in their history and their fourth season in the Third Division South, the third tier of English football. Alongside competing in the Third Division South, the club also participated in the FA Cup. Colchester were knocked out in the first round of the cup by Millwall following a replay. The club struggled in the league for the second successive season, eventually finishing 23rd of 24 teams under new manager Jack Butler. The club had to apply for re-election at the end of the season for the first of three occasions in its history. All four clubs applying for re-election were successful, with Colchester receiving 45 votes, behind Chester by three votes but ahead of both Walsall (32 votes) and Halifax Town (28 votes).

== Season overview ==
Following Jimmy Allen's resignation at the end of the previous season, the Colchester United board shortlisted three names for the vacant managerial position, and in-line with their cost reduction policy, appointed Ron Meades as player-manager. Meades had claimed to have been with Cardiff City, and more recently manager of Western League side Wadebridge Town. Journalist Arthur Wood investigated Meades' background and revealed that Meades was a fraud, and after just four days in charge, Meades was asked to leave by the club.

Colchester hurriedly appointed a new manager, Jack Butler, a former player for Arsenal and England international. He had coached in Belgium, initially with Royal Daring Club Molenbeek and had been in charge of the Belgium national team between 1935 and 1940, leading them to the 1938 World Cup finals. More recently, he had managed Torquay United and Crystal Palace, but Butler had little time to prepare his side ahead of the new season, and a 13-game winless run in late 1953 saw Colchester slump to 23rd position in the league.

With the crowd average falling season-on-season to 7,797, the club were required to apply for re-election after finishing the campaign ten points adrift of safety. Colchester earned 45 votes, enough to ensure another season in the Football League, but having been prolific goalscorers earlier in their history, the club had scored only 50 league goals this season.

== Players ==
As of match played 29 April 1954.

Name	Position	Nationality	Place of birth	Date of birth	Apps	Goals	Signed from	Date signed	Fee
Goalkeepers
Frank Coombs	GK	(England)	East Ham	24 April 1925 (aged 28)	31	0	(England) Southend United	8 March 1952 (Note: Date of signing refers to the date of the player's first game for the club)	£450
George Wright	GK	(England)	Plymouth	10 October 1919 (aged 33)	164	0	(England) Plymouth Argyle	May 1949	£1,000
John Wright	GK	(England)	Aldershot	13 August 1933 (aged 19)	0	0	(England) Colchester Casuals	23 May 1952	Free transfer
Defenders
Roy Bicknell	CB	(England)	Doncaster	19 February 1926 (aged 27)	8	0	(England) Gravesend & Northfleet	June 1952	£1,000
George French	FB	(England)	Colchester	10 November 1926 (aged 26)	1	0	(England) West Ham United	February 1949	Free transfer
John Harrison	FB	(England)	Leicester	27 September 1927 (aged 25)	128	0	(England) Aston Villa	30 September 1950	Nominal
Billy Hunt	CB	(England)	Colchester	25 November 1934 (aged 18)	0	0	Amateur	August 1953	Free transfer
Digger Kettle	FB	(England)	Colchester	3 June 1922 (aged 30)	168	1	(England) Arclight Sports	September 1946	Free transfer
Fred Lewis	FB	(England)	Broughton Gifford	26 July 1923 (aged 29)	0	0	(England) Chelsea	Summer 1953	Free transfer
Reg Stewart	CB	(England)	Sheffield	30 October 1925 (aged 27)	191	0	(England) Sheffield Wednesday	20 August 1949	£1,000
Midfielders
Harry Bearryman	WH	(England)	Wandsworth	26 September 1924 (aged 28)	293	10	(England) Chelsea	4 July 1947	Free transfer
Bob Dale	WH	(England)	Irlam	31 October 1931 (aged 21)	0	0	(England) Bury	24 December 1953	£1,500
Austin Dunne	WH	(Republic of Ireland)	Limerick	31 July 1934 (aged 18)	0	0	(Republic of Ireland) Limerick	October 1953	Free transfer
Jimmy Elder	WH	(Scotland)	Scone	5 March 1928 (aged 25)	143	10	(England) Portsmouth	19 August 1950	£1,000
Trevor Harris	WH	(England)	Colchester	6 February 1936 (aged 17)	0	0	Amateur	July 1951	Free transfer
Bert Hill	WH	(England)	West Ham	8 March 1930 (aged 23)	1	0	(England) Chelsea	September 1952	£300
Ron Hunt	WH	(England)	Colchester	26 September 1933 (aged 19)	3	0	Amateur	October 1951	Free transfer
Doug Keene	WH	(England)	Hendon	30 August 1928 (aged 24)	0	0	(England) Brighton & Hove Albion	20 August 1953	£1,000
Forwards
Peter Aitchison	WG	(England)	Harlow	19 September 1931 (aged 21)	12	2	Amateur	August 1950	Free transfer
John Church	WG	(England)	Lowestoft	17 September 1919 (aged 33)	122	22	(England) Norwich City	19 August 1950	£1,000
Mike Grice	WG	(England)	Woking	3 November 1931 (aged 21)	13	1	(England) Lowestoft Town	Summer 1952	£25
Kevin McCurley	CF	(England)	Consett	2 April 1926 (aged 27)	58	25	(England) Liverpool	June 1951	£750
Johnny McKim	IF	(Scotland)	Greenock	22 January 1926 (aged 27)	84	33	(England) Chelsea	19 August 1950	£1,000
Ken Plant	CF	(England)	Nuneaton	15 August 1925 (aged 27)	0	0	(England) Bury	January 1954	Undisclosed
Peter Wright	WG	(England)	Colchester	26 January 1934 (aged 19)	21	2	Amateur	November 1951	Free transfer

== Transfers ==
=== In ===
Date	Position	Nationality	Name	From	Fee	Ref.
Summer 1953	FB	(England)	Fred Lewis	(England) Chelsea	Free transfer	
June 1953	CF	(England)	Tommy Harris	(England) Leyton Orient	Part-exchange with Stan Edwards	
August 1953	CB	(England)	Billy Hunt	Amateur	Free transfer	
20 August 1953	WH	(England)	Doug Keene	(England) Brighton & Hove Albion	£1,000	(Note: Date of signing refers to the date of the player's first game for the club)
October 1953	WH	(Republic of Ireland)	Austin Dunne	(Republic of Ireland) Limerick	Free transfer	
24 December 1953	WH	(England)	Bob Dale	(England) Bury	£1,500	
January 1954	CF	(England)	Ken Plant	(England) Bury	Undisclosed	

- Total spending: ▼ ~ £2,500

=== Out ===
Date	Position	Nationality	Name	To	Fee	Ref.
2 May 1953	FB	(England)	Phil Rookes	(England) Chichester City	Manager	(Note: Date of departure refers to the date of the player's final game for the club)
June 1953	CF	(England)	Stan Edwards	(England) Leyton Orient	Part-exchange with Tommy Harris	
22 August 1953	FB	(Wales)	Trevor Rowlands	(England) Great Yarmouth Town	Free transfer	
5 December 1953	CF	(England)	Tommy Harris	(England) Tonbridge	Free transfer	
23 January 1954	FW	(England)	Dick Cullum	(England) Sittingbourne	Free transfer	
13 March 1954	IF	(England)	Bert Barlow	Retired	Retired	
17 April 1954	IF	(England)	Augie Scott	(England) Cheltenham Town	Player-coach	

== Match details ==
=== Third Division South ===
==== Results round by round ====
Round	1	2	3	4	5	6	7	8	9	10	11	12	13	14	15	16	17	18	19	20	21	22	23	24	25	26	27	28	29	30	31	32	33	34	35	36	37	38	39	40	41	42	43	44	45	46
Ground	H	A	A	H	H	A	A	H	H	A	A	H	H	A	H	A	H	A	H	A	A	H	H	H	A	A	H	H	A	H	A	H	A	H	A	H	A	H	A	H	H	A	A	A	A	H
Result	W	L	W	W	L	L	L	W	L	L	L	D	L	L	L	L	D	L	D	L	L	W	L	W	D	W	D	L	L	D	W	W	L	L	L	L	L	D	L	D	W	L	D	L	D	L
Position	2	15	9	6	8	13	14	10	13	16	18	20	20	22	22	22	22	22	22	22	22	22	23	23	23	23	22	22	23	23	23	23	23	23	23	23	23	23	23	23	23	23	23	23	23	23

Source: 11v11.com
A = Away; H = Home; W = Win; D = Draw; L = Loss

==== League table ====
Pos	Team	Pld	W	D	L	GF	GA	GAv	Pts	Promotion or relegation
20	Swindon Town	46	15	10	21	67	70	0.957	40	
21	Shrewsbury Town	46	14	12	20	65	76	0.855	40	
22	Crystal Palace	46	14	12	20	60	86	0.698	40	
23	Colchester United	46	10	10	26	50	78	0.641	30	Re-elected
24	Walsall	46	9	8	29	40	87	0.460	26	Re-elected

Source: rsssf.com

==== Matches ====
20 August 1953 1	Colchester United	3–1	Torquay United	Colchester
	Barlow; Elder; McCurley	Report	Unknown goalscorer	Stadium: Layer Road; Attendance: 8,841

22 August 1953 2	Ipswich Town	3–0	Colchester United	Ipswich
	MacLuckie; Reed	Report; Report		Stadium: Portman Road; Attendance: 18,130; Referee: J. Pollard

26 August 1953 3	Exeter City	1–2	Colchester United	Exeter
	Unknown goalscorer	Report	Barlow; McCurley	Stadium: St James Park; Attendance: 10,589

29 August 1953 4	Colchester United	4–1	Crystal Palace	Colchester
	Scott; Barlow; McCurley	Report	Unknown goalscorer	Stadium: Layer Road; Attendance: 6,811

3 September 1953 5	Colchester United	0–1	Exeter City	Colchester
		Report	Unknown goalscorer	Stadium: Layer Road; Attendance: 8,791

5 September 1953 6	Bristol City	3–0	Colchester United	Bristol
	Unknown goalscorer	Report		Stadium: Ashton Gate Stadium; Attendance: 17,219

9 September 1953 7	Norwich City	2–1	Colchester United	Norwich
	Unknown goalscorer	Report	Scott	Stadium: Carrow Road; Attendance: 22,228

12 September 1953 8	Colchester United	3–0	Aldershot	Colchester
	Barlow; Bearryman; McCurley	Report		Stadium: Layer Road; Attendance: 8,170

17 September 1953 9	Colchester United	0–1	Norwich City	Colchester
		Report	Unknown goalscorer	Stadium: Layer Road; Attendance: 10,218

19 September 1953 10	Swindon Town	3–0	Colchester United	Swindon
	Lewis (o.g.); Betteridge	Report; Report		Stadium: County Ground; Attendance: 12,284

23 September 1953 11	Southampton	2–1	Colchester United	Southampton
	Horton; Day	Report	McKim	Stadium: The Dell; Attendance: 14,842

26 September 1953 12	Colchester United	1–1	Walsall	Colchester
	Grice	Report	Unknown goalscorer	Stadium: Layer Road; Attendance: 7,643

1 October 1953 13	Colchester United	0–1	Southampton	Colchester
		Report	Day	Stadium: Layer Road; Attendance: 6,705

3 October 1953 14	Shrewsbury Town	3–1	Colchester United	Shrewsbury
	Unknown goalscorer	Report	Barlow	Stadium: Gay Meadow; Attendance: 9,915

10 October 1953 15	Colchester United	0–3	Coventry City	Colchester
		Report	Brown	Stadium: Layer Road; Attendance: 8,174

17 October 1953 16	Gillingham	2–0	Colchester United	Gillingham
	Unknown goalscorer	Report		Stadium: Priestfield Stadium; Attendance: 8,296

24 October 1953 17	Colchester United	1–1	Northampton Town	Colchester
	Elder (pen.)	Report	Unknown goalscorer	Stadium: Layer Road; Attendance: 7,599

31 October 1953 18	Torquay United	3–1	Colchester United	Torquay
	Unknown goalscorer	Report	McCurley	Stadium: Plainmoor; Attendance: 6,251

7 November 1953 19	Colchester United	2–2	Watford	Colchester
	Barlow; McCurley	Report	Bowie; Nolan	Stadium: Layer Road; Attendance: 6,905

14 November 1953 20	Brighton & Hove Albion	1–0	Colchester United	Hove
	Gordon	Report		Stadium: Goldstone Ground; Attendance: 15,624

28 November 1953 21	Reading	2–0	Colchester United	Reading
	Unknown goalscorer	Report		Stadium: Elm Park; Attendance: 12,036

5 December 1953 22	Colchester United	1–0	Leyton Orient	Colchester
	Grice	Report		Stadium: Layer Road; Attendance: 6,819

19 December 1953 23	Colchester United	1–2	Ipswich Town	Colchester
	Scott	Report; Report	Elsworthy; Reed	Stadium: Layer Road; Attendance: 10,316; Referee: J. Pollard

25 December 1953 24	Colchester United	5–0	Queens Park Rangers	Colchester
	Scott; Barlow; McKim	Report		Stadium: Layer Road; Attendance: 6,155

26 December 1953 25	Queens Park Rangers	0–0	Colchester United	Shepherd's Bush
		Report		Stadium: Loftus Road; Attendance: 10,674

2 January 1954 26	Crystal Palace	0–1	Colchester United	Selhurst
		Report	McCurley 25'	Stadium: Selhurst Park; Attendance: 6,971

9 January 1954 27	Colchester United	2–2	Newport County	Colchester
	Barlow 66'; Dale 74'	Report	Graham; Haines	Stadium: Layer Road; Attendance: 6,434

16 January 1954 28	Colchester United	0–2	Bristol City	Colchester
		Report	Unknown goalscorer	Stadium: Layer Road; Attendance: 7,931

23 January 1954 29	Aldershot	3–0	Colchester United	Aldershot
	Unknown goalscorer	Report		Stadium: Recreation Ground; Attendance: 4,502

6 February 1954 30	Colchester United	2–2	Swindon Town	Colchester
	Plant 46'; Dale	Report; Report	Sampson 22'; Owen	Stadium: Layer Road; Attendance: 6,824

13 February 1954 31	Walsall	2–3	Colchester United	Walsall
	Unknown goalscorer	Report	Plant; P. Wright	Stadium: Fellows Park; Attendance: 9,819

20 February 1954 32	Colchester United	3–1	Shrewsbury Town	Colchester
	Barlow; Keene; Plant	Report	Unknown goalscorer	Stadium: Layer Road; Attendance: 7,852

27 February 1954 33	Coventry City	2–1	Colchester United	Coventry
	Bradbury; Jamieson (pen.)	Report	Plant	Stadium: Highfield Road; Attendance: 11,852

6 March 1954 34	Colchester United	0–1	Gillingham	Colchester
		Report	Unknown goalscorer	Stadium: Layer Road; Attendance: 6,824

13 March 1954 35	Southend United	3–0	Colchester United	Southend-on-Sea
	Bainbridge; Hollis	Report; Report		Stadium: Southend Stadium; Attendance: 8,100

20 March 1954 36	Colchester United	2–4	Reading	Colchester
	Elder (pen.) (pen.)	Report	Unknown goalscorer	Stadium: Layer Road; Attendance: 6,726

27 March 1954 37	Watford	3–0	Colchester United	Watford
	Adams; R. Brown; Cook	Report		Stadium: Vicarage Road; Attendance: 10,466

3 April 1954 38	Colchester United	1–1	Brighton & Hove Albion	Colchester
	Hill 89'	Report	Leadbetter 82'	Stadium: Layer Road; Attendance: 8,282

10 April 1954 39	Leyton Orient	3–1	Colchester United	Leyton
	Unknown goalscorer	Report	McKim	Stadium: Brisbane Road; Attendance: 9,309

16 April 1954 40	Colchester United	1–1	Bournemouth & Boscombe Athletic	Colchester
	Dale	Report	Unknown goalscorer	Stadium: Layer Road; Attendance: 8,223

17 April 1954 41	Colchester United	3–0	Millwall	Colchester
	Bearryman; McKim	Report		Stadium: Layer Road; Attendance: 7,450

19 April 1954 42	Bournemouth & Boscombe Athletic	4–2	Colchester United	Bournemouth
	Unknown goalscorer	Report	Dale; P. Wright	Stadium: Dean Court; Attendance: 7,778

22 April 1954 43	Newport County	1–1	Colchester United	Newport
	Graham	Report	Plant	Stadium: Somerton Park; Attendance: 7,396

24 April 1954 44	Northampton Town	3–0	Colchester United	Northampton
	Unknown goalscorer	Report		Stadium: County Ground; Attendance: 7,344

26 April 1954 45	Millwall	0–0	Colchester United	New Cross
		Report		Stadium: The Den; Attendance: 5,572

29 April 1954 46	Colchester United	0–1	Southend United	Colchester
		Report; Report	Bainbridge	Stadium: Layer Road; Attendance: 6,035

=== FA Cup ===
21 November 1953 1st round	Colchester United	1–1	Millwall	Colchester
	McCurley	Report	Stobbart	Stadium: Layer Road; Attendance: 9,765

23 November 1953 1st round replay	Millwall	4–0	Colchester United	New Cross
	Stobbart; Hazlett; Neary	Report		Stadium: The Den; Attendance: 8,898

== Squad statistics ==
=== Appearances and goals ===
No.	Pos	Nat	Player	Total		Third Division South		FA Cup	
No.	Pos	Nat	Player	Apps	Goals	Apps	Goals	Apps	Goals
	GK	(England) ENG	Frank Coombs	7	0	7	0	0	0
	GK	(England) ENG	George Wright	41	0	39	0	2	0
	DF	(England) ENG	Roy Bicknell	21	0	19	0	2	0
	DF	(England) ENG	George French	2	0	2	0	0	0
	DF	(England) ENG	John Harrison	42	0	41	0	1	0
	DF	(England) ENG	Digger Kettle	4	0	3	0	1	0
	DF	(England) ENG	Fred Lewis	48	0	46	0	2	0
	DF	(England) ENG	Reg Stewart	27	0	27	0	0	0
	MF	(England) ENG	Harry Bearryman	39	2	37	2	2	0
	MF	(England) ENG	Bob Dale	21	4	21	4	0	0
	MF	(Scotland) SCO	Jimmy Elder	39	4	37	4	2	0
	MF	(England) ENG	Bert Hill	16	1	16	1	0	0
	MF	(England) ENG	Ron Hunt	2	0	2	0	0	0
	MF	(England) ENG	Doug Keene	24	1	22	1	2	0
	FW	(England) ENG	John Church	7	0	6	0	1	0
	FW	(England) ENG	Mike Grice	18	2	18	2	0	0
	FW	(England) ENG	Kevin McCurley	34	9	32	8	2	1
	FW	(Scotland) SCO	Johnny McKim	19	6	19	6	0	0
	FW	(England) ENG	Ken Plant	17	6	17	6	0	0
	FW	(England) ENG	Peter Wright	23	2	22	2	1	0
Players who appeared for Colchester who left during the season
	FW	(England) ENG	Bert Barlow	34	10	32	10	2	0
	FW	(England) ENG	Dick Cullum	1	0	1	0	0	0
	FW	(England) ENG	Tommy Harris	3	0	3	0	0	0
	FW	(England) ENG	Augie Scott	39	4	37	4	2	0

=== Goalscorers ===
Place	Nationality	Position	Name	Third Division South	FA Cup	Total
1	(England)	IF	Bert Barlow	10	0	10
2	(England)	CF	Kevin McCurley	8	1	9
3	(Scotland)	IF	Johnny McKim	6	0	6
3	(England)	CF	Ken Plant	6	0	6
5	(England)	WH	Bob Dale	4	0	4
5	(Scotland)	WH	Jimmy Elder	4	0	4
5	(England)	IF	Augie Scott	4	0	4
8	(England)	WH	Harry Bearryman	2	0	2
8	(England)	WG	Mike Grice	2	0	2
8	(England)	WG	Peter Wright	2	0	2
11	(England)	WH	Bert Hill	1	0	1
11	(England)	WH	Doug Keene	1	0	1
			Own goals	0	0	0
			TOTALS	51	1	52

=== Clean sheets ===
Number of games goalkeepers kept a clean sheet.

Place	Nationality	Player	Third Division South	FA Cup	Total
1	(England)	George Wright	7	0	7
		TOTALS	7	0	7

=== Player debuts ===
Players making their first-team Colchester United debut in a fully competitive match.

Position	Nationality	Player	Date	Opponent	Ground	Notes
WH	(England)	Doug Keene	20 August 1953	Torquay United	Layer Road	
FB	(England)	Fred Lewis	20 August 1953	Torquay United	Layer Road	
CF	(England)	Tommy Harris	10 October 1953	Coventry City	Layer Road	
WH	(England)	Bob Dale	2 January 1954	Crystal Palace	Selhurst Park	
CF	(England)	Ken Plant	6 February 1954	Swindon Town	Layer Road	

== See also ==
- List of Colchester United F.C. seasons
