= 1951–52 Colchester United F.C. season =

Colchester United
1951–52 season
- Chairman: Bill Allen
- Manager: Jimmy Allen
- Stadium: Layer Road
- Third Division South: 10th
- FA Cup: 3rd round (eliminated by Barnsley)
- Top goalscorer: League: Vic Keeble (16); All: Vic Keeble (17)
- Highest home attendance: 15,175 v Ipswich Town, 1 March 1952
- Lowest home attendance: 6,128 v Watford, 3 May 1952
- Average home league attendance: 9,429
- Biggest win: 4–1 v Bristol City, 20 October 1951; 4–1 v Reading, 3 April 1952
- Biggest defeat: 0–7 v Leyton Orient, 5 January 1952
Home colours

The 1951–52 season was Colchester United's tenth season in their history and their second season in the Third Division South, the third tier of English football. They bettered the previous season's 16th-place finish by finishing 10th. The club also participated in the FA Cup, reaching the third round before being knocked out by Second Division side Barnsley.

== Season overview ==
Colchester's 1951–52 season began poorly, with six defeats in the opening seven games due to an injury-ravaged squad. Rooted to the foot of the table, a mid-season revival including a double over local rivals Ipswich Town eventually saw the U's finish the season 10th in the final standings.

Vic Keeble became Colchester's first export that commanded a high transfer fee when he moved to First Division Newcastle United for a £15,000 fee in January 1952. Despite his mid-season sale, Keeble remained the top scorer for the U's with 17 goals. Manager Jimmy Allen signed Kevin McCurley from Liverpool for £750 as a replacement for Keeble in March 1952. He scored six times in eleven games during the final two months of the campaign.

== Players ==
As of match played 3 May 1952.

Name	Position	Nationality	Place of birth	Date of birth	Apps	Goals	Signed from	Date signed	Fee
Goalkeepers
Frank Coombs	GK	(England)	East Ham	24 April 1925 (aged 26)	0	0	(England) Southend United	8 March 1952 (Note: Date of signing refers to the date of the player's first game for the club)	£450
George Wright	GK	(England)	Plymouth	10 October 1919 (aged 31)	95	0	(England) Plymouth Argyle	May 1949	£1,000
Defenders
George French	FB	(England)	Colchester	10 November 1926 (aged 24)	0	0	(England) West Ham United	February 1949	Free transfer
John Harrison	FB	(England)	Leicester	27 September 1927 (aged 23)	33	0	(England) Aston Villa	30 September 1950	Nominal
Digger Kettle	FB	(England)	Colchester	3 June 1922 (aged 28)	165	1	(England) Arclight Sports	September 1946	Free transfer
Phil Rookes	FB	(England)	Dulverton	23 April 1919 (aged 32)	0	0	(England) Portsmouth	July 1951	£1,000
Trevor Rowlands	FB	(Wales)	Wattstown	2 February 1922 (aged 29)	15	1	(England) Norwich City	20 July 1950	£1,000
Reg Stewart	CB	(England)	Sheffield	30 October 1925 (aged 25)	99	0	(England) Sheffield Wednesday	20 August 1949	£1,000
Midfielders
Harry Bearryman	WH	(England)	Wandsworth	26 September 1924 (aged 26)	194	9	(England) Chelsea	4 July 1947	Free transfer
Jimmy Elder	WH	(Scotland)	Scone	5 March 1928 (aged 23)	46	4	(England) Portsmouth	19 August 1950	£1,000
Trevor Harris	WH	(England)	Colchester	6 February 1936 (aged 15)	0	0	Amateur	July 1951	Free transfer
Ron Hunt	WH	(England)	Colchester	26 September 1933 (aged 17)	0	0	Amateur	October 1951	Free transfer
Len Jones	WH	(England)	Barnsley	9 June 1913 (aged 37)	43	3	(England) Southend United	19 August 1950	Undisclosed
John Moore	WH	(England)	Chiswick	25 September 1923 (aged 27)	13	0	(England) Brentford	8 September 1949	£1,000
Harry Wilkinson	WH	(England)	Sunderland	20 March 1926 (aged 25)	0	0	(England) Exeter City	1951	Free transfer
Forwards
Peter Aitchison	WG	(England)	Harlow	19 September 1931 (aged 19)	0	0	Amateur	August 1950	Free transfer
John Church	WG	(England)	Lowestoft	17 September 1919 (aged 31)	42	10	(England) Norwich City	19 August 1950	£1,000
Dick Cullum	FW	(England)	Colchester	28 January 1931 (aged 20)	0	0	(England) Colchester Colts	28 March 1951	Free transfer
Adam Davidson	WG	(Scotland)	Invergowrie	18 November 1929 (aged 21)	0	0	(England) Sheffield Wednesday	August 1951	Free transfer
Jack McClelland	FW	(England)	Colchester	11 August 1930 (aged 20)	0	0	Amateur	Summer 1951	Free transfer
Kevin McCurley	CF	(England)	Consett	2 April 1926 (aged 25)	0	0	(England) Liverpool	June 1951	£750
Johnny McKim	IF	(Scotland)	Greenock	22 January 1926 (aged 25)	24	8	(England) Chelsea	19 August 1950	£1,000
Augie Scott	IF	(England)	Sunderland	19 February 1921 (aged 30)	0	0	(England) Southampton	18 August 1951	£2,000
Arthur Turner	CF	(England)	Poplar	22 January 1921 (aged 30)	155	98	(England) Charlton Athletic	September 1946	Free transfer
Peter Wright	WG	(England)	Colchester	26 January 1934 (aged 17)	0	0	Amateur	November 1951	Free transfer

== Transfers ==
=== In ===
Date	Position	Nationality	Name	From	Fee	Ref.
1951	WH	(England)	Harry Wilkinson	(England) Exeter City	Free transfer	
Summer 1951	FW	(England)	Jack McClelland	Amateur	Free transfer	
June 1951	CF	(England)	Kevin McCurley	(England) Liverpool	£750	
July 1951	WH	(England)	Trevor Harris	Amateur	Free transfer	
July 1951	FB	(England)	Phil Rookes	(England) Portsmouth	£1,000	
August 1951	WG	(Scotland)	Adam Davidson	(England) Sheffield Wednesday	Free transfer	
18 August 1951	IF	(England)	Augie Scott	(England) Southampton	£2,000	(Note: Date of signing refers to the date of the player's first game for the club)
October 1951	WH	(England)	Ron Hunt	Amateur	Free transfer	
November 1951	WG	(England)	Peter Wright	Amateur	Free transfer	
8 March 1952	GK	(England)	Frank Coombs	(England) Southend United	£450	

- Total spending: ▼ ~ £4,200

=== Out ===
Date	Position	Nationality	Name	To	Fee	Ref.
End of season	IF	(England)	Bob Curry	(England) Clacton Town	Player-manager	
August 1951	WG	(England)	Bob Allen	(England) Bedford Town	Free transfer	
2 November 1951	WG	(England)	Dennis Hillman	(England) Gillingham	Free transfer	
29 January 1952	CF	(England)	Vic Keeble	(England) Newcastle United	£15,000	
23 February 1952	IF	(England)	Fred Cutting	(England) Great Yarmouth Town	Free transfer	(Note: Date of departure refers to the date of the player's final game for the club)

- Total incoming: ▲ ~ £15,000

== Match details ==
=== Third Division South ===
==== Results round by round ====
Round	1	2	3	4	5	6	7	8	9	10	11	12	13	14	15	16	17	18	19	20	21	22	23	24	25	26	27	28	29	30	31	32	33	34	35	36	37	38	39	40	41	42	43	44	45	46
Ground	A	H	H	A	A	A	H	H	A	H	A	H	A	H	A	H	A	H	H	A	A	A	H	H	A	A	H	A	H	H	A	A	H	A	H	A	H	A	H	H	A	A	A	H	H	H
Result	L	D	L	L	L	L	L	W	W	D	D	D	W	W	D	L	L	W	D	D	D	W	W	W	L	W	W	L	W	L	L	D	W	L	D	L	W	W	W	W	L	L	L	D	D	W
Position	20	20	23	24	24	24	24	24	24	23	22	22	20	18	16	19	20	17	19	16	17	14	13	13	14	14	11	13	11	12	13	13	11	12	12	13	11	10	10	9	9	10	11	10	11	10

Source: 11v11.com
A = Away; H = Home; W = Win; D = Draw; L = Loss

==== League table ====
Pos	Team	Pld	W	D	L	GF	GA	GAv	Pts
8	Northampton Town	46	22	5	19	93	74	1.257	49
9	Southend United	46	19	10	17	75	66	1.136	48
10	Colchester United	46	17	12	17	56	77	0.727	46
11	Torquay United	46	17	10	19	86	98	0.878	44
12	Aldershot	46	18	8	20	78	89	0.876	44

==== Matches ====
18 August 1951 1	Brighton & Hove Albion	5–1	Colchester United	Hove
	Bennett; Garbutt; Reed; Willard	Report	Jones	Stadium: Goldstone Ground; Attendance: 17,068

23 August 1951 2	Colchester United	1–1	Norwich City	Colchester
	Keeble	Report	Unknown goalscorer	Stadium: Layer Road; Attendance: 14,085

25 August 1951 3	Colchester United	1–2	Crystal Palace	Colchester
	Turner	Report	Unknown goalscorer	Stadium: Layer Road; Attendance: 10,135

29 August 1951 4	Norwich City	5–2	Colchester United	Norwich
	Unknown goalscorer	Report	Cutting	Stadium: Carrow Road; Attendance: 24,705

1 September 1951 5	Swindon Town	2–1	Colchester United	Swindon
	Onslow; Owen	Report; Report	Keeble	Stadium: County Ground; Attendance: 10,667

5 September 1951 6	Plymouth Argyle	3–1	Colchester United	Plymouth
	Dews; Ratcliffe; Tadman	Report; Report	Elder (pen.)	Stadium: Home Park; Attendance: 17,892

8 September 1951 7	Colchester United	0–1	Leyton Orient	Colchester
		Report	Unknown goalscorer	Stadium: Layer Road; Attendance: 10,266

13 September 1951 8	Colchester United	1–0	Plymouth Argyle	Colchester
	Keeble	Report; Report		Stadium: Layer Road; Attendance: 8,105

15 September 1951 9	Walsall	1–3	Colchester United	Walsall
	Unknown goalscorer	Report	Cutting; Keeble	Stadium: Fellows Park; Attendance: 7,327

22 September 1951 10	Colchester United	2–2	Shrewsbury Town	Colchester
	Cutting; Keeble	Report	Unknown goalscorer	Stadium: Layer Road; Attendance: 10,314

29 September 1951 11	Aldershot	1–1	Colchester United	Aldershot
	Unknown goalscorer	Report	Keeble	Stadium: Recreation Ground; Attendance: 9,013

6 October 1951 12	Colchester United	0–0	Torquay United	Colchester
		Report		Stadium: Layer Road; Attendance: 9,614

13 October 1951 13	Ipswich Town	0–2	Colchester United	Ipswich
		Report; Report	Cutting; Keeble	Stadium: Portman Road; Attendance: 19,275; Referee: B. Everett

20 October 1951 14	Colchester United	4–1	Bristol City	Colchester
	Cutting; Keeble	Report	Unknown goalscorer	Stadium: Layer Road; Attendance: 9,552

27 October 1951 15	Port Vale	1–1	Colchester United	Burslem
	Bennett	Report	Cutting	Stadium: Vale Park; Attendance: 10,576

3 November 1951 16	Colchester United	2–5	Northampton Town	Colchester
	Church; Keeble	Report	Unknown goalscorer	Stadium: Layer Road; Attendance: 10,326

10 November 1951 17	Reading	4–2	Colchester United	Reading
	Bainbridge; Lewis	Report	Scott 16', 22'	Stadium: Elm Park; Attendance: 14,230

17 November 1951 18	Colchester United	2–1	Newport County	Colchester
	Cutting; Keeble	Report	Birch	Stadium: Layer Road; Attendance: 7,229

1 December 1951 19	Colchester United	1–1	Bournemouth & Boscombe Athletic	Colchester
	Church	Report	Unknown goalscorer	Stadium: Layer Road; Attendance: 8,902

8 December 1951 20	Millwall	1–1	Colchester United	New Cross
	Constantine	Report	Turner; Stewart (red card)	Stadium: The Den; Attendance: 15,285

22 December 1951 21	Crystal Palace	2–2	Colchester United	Selhurst
	Unknown goalscorer	Report	McKim	Stadium: Selhurst Park; Attendance: 11,547

25 December 1951 22	Gillingham	1–2	Colchester United	Gillingham
	Unknown goalscorer	Report	Aitchison; Keeble	Stadium: Priestfield Stadium; Attendance: 9,774

26 December 1951 23	Colchester United	1–0	Gillingham	Colchester
	Aitchison	Report		Stadium: Layer Road; Attendance: 11,127

29 December 1951 24	Colchester United	2–0	Swindon Town	Colchester
	McKim; Keeble	Report; Report		Stadium: Layer Road; Attendance: 7,407

5 January 1952 25	Leyton Orient	7–0	Colchester United	Leyton
	Unknown goalscorer	Report		Stadium: Brisbane Road; Attendance: 11,797

16 January 1952 26	Watford	0–1	Colchester United	Watford
		Report	McKim	Stadium: Vicarage Road; Attendance: 3,245

19 January 1952 27	Colchester United	3–2	Walsall	Colchester
	McKim; Keeble	Report	Unknown goalscorer	Stadium: Layer Road; Attendance: 7,240

26 January 1952 28	Shrewsbury Town	1–0	Colchester United	Shrewsbury
	Unknown goalscorer	Report		Stadium: Gay Meadow; Attendance: 7,981

2 February 1952 29	Colchester United	1–0	Exeter City	Colchester
	McKim	Report		Stadium: Layer Road; Attendance: 7,692

9 February 1952 30	Colchester United	0–2	Aldershot	Colchester
		Report	Unknown goalscorer	Stadium: Layer Road; Attendance: 7,663

16 February 1952 31	Torquay United	3–1	Colchester United	Torquay
	Unknown goalscorer	Report	McKim	Stadium: Plainmoor; Attendance: 6,603

23 February 1952 32	Exeter City	0–0	Colchester United	Exeter
		Report		Stadium: St James Park; Attendance: 7,929

1 March 1952 33	Colchester United	1–0	Ipswich Town	Colchester
	Rowlands	Report; Report		Stadium: Layer Road; Attendance: 15,175; Referee: B. Everett

8 March 1952 34	Bristol City	2–0	Colchester United	Bristol
	Unknown goalscorer	Report		Stadium: Ashton Gate Stadium; Attendance: 12,657

15 March 1952 35	Colchester United	0–0	Port Vale	Colchester
		Report		Stadium: Layer Road; Attendance: 7,559

22 March 1952 36	Northampton Town	2–0	Colchester United	Northampton
	Unknown goalscorer	Report		Stadium: County Ground; Attendance: 10,260

3 April 1952 37	Colchester United	4–1	Reading	Colchester
	McCurley 55', 81'; McKim 70', 86'	Report	Blackman 37'	Stadium: Layer Road; Attendance: 7,340

5 April 1952 38	Newport County	0–1	Colchester United	Newport
		Report	McCurley	Stadium: Somerton Park; Attendance: 6,821

11 April 1952 39	Colchester United	2–1	Bristol Rovers	Colchester
	Scott; Elder (pen.)	Report	Unknown goalscorer	Stadium: Layer Road; Attendance: 12,440

12 April 1952 40	Colchester United	1–0	Southend United	Colchester
	McCurley	Report; Report		Stadium: Layer Road; Attendance: 11,967

14 April 1952 41	Bristol Rovers	6–0	Colchester United	Bristol
	Unknown goalscorer	Report		Stadium: Eastville Stadium; Attendance: 10,630

19 April 1952 42	Bournemouth & Boscombe Athletic	5–0	Colchester United	Bournemouth
	Unknown goalscorer	Report		Stadium: Dean Court; Attendance: 8,666

22 April 1952 43	Southend United	3–2	Colchester United	Southend-on-Sea
	Grant; Wakefield	Report; Report	Church; McCurley	Stadium: Southend Stadium; Attendance: 7,846

26 April 1952 44	Colchester United	2–2	Millwall	Colchester
	Scott; McCurley	Report	Mansfield; Saward	Stadium: Layer Road; Attendance: 8,259

1 May 1952 45	Colchester United	0–0	Brighton & Hove Albion	Colchester
		Report		Stadium: Layer Road; Attendance: 7,075

3 May 1952 46	Colchester United	1–0	Watford	Colchester
	McKim	Report		Stadium: Layer Road; Attendance: 6,128

=== FA Cup ===
24 November 1951 1st round	Colchester United	3–1	Port Vale	Colchester
	Keeble 11'; Scott 24'; Elder 37' (pen.)	Report	Pinchbeck 69'	Stadium: Layer Road; Attendance: 10,119

15 December 1951 2nd round	Colchester United	2–1	Bristol City	Colchester
	Scott 6'; Davidson 30'	Report	Unknown goalscorer	Stadium: Layer Road; Attendance: 9,988

12 January 1952 3rd round	Barnsley	3–0	Colchester United	Barnsley
	Unknown goalscorer	Report		Stadium: Oakwell; Attendance: 24,429

== Squad statistics ==
=== Appearances and goals ===
No.	Pos	Nat	Player	Total		Third Division South		FA Cup	
No.	Pos	Nat	Player	Apps	Goals	Apps	Goals	Apps	Goals
	GK	(England) ENG	Frank Coombs	13	0	13	0	0	0
	GK	(England) ENG	George Wright	36	0	33	0	3	0
	DF	(England) ENG	John Harrison	44	0	41	0	3	0
	DF	(England) ENG	Digger Kettle	3	0	3	0	0	0
	DF	(England) ENG	Phil Rookes	28	0	25	0	3	0
	DF	(Wales) WAL	Trevor Rowlands	26	1	26	1	0	0
	DF	(England) ENG	Reg Stewart	47	0	44	0	3	0
	MF	(England) ENG	Harry Bearryman	49	0	46	0	3	0
	MF	(Scotland) SCO	Jimmy Elder	47	3	44	2	3	1
	MF	(England) ENG	Ron Hunt	3	0	3	0	0	0
	MF	(England) ENG	Len Jones	18	1	17	1	1	0
	MF	(England) ENG	John Moore	2	0	2	0	0	0
	FW	(England) ENG	Peter Aitchison	9	2	9	2	0	0
	FW	(England) ENG	John Church	41	3	38	3	3	0
	FW	(Scotland) SCO	Adam Davidson	21	1	19	0	2	1
	FW	(England) ENG	Kevin McCurley	11	6	11	6	0	0
	FW	(Scotland) SCO	Johnny McKim	27	10	26	10	1	0
	FW	(England) ENG	Augie Scott	48	6	45	4	3	2
	FW	(England) ENG	Arthur Turner	9	2	9	2	0	0
	FW	(England) ENG	Peter Wright	9	0	9	0	0	0
Players who appeared for Colchester who left during the season
	FW	(England) ENG	Fred Cutting	20	9	18	9	2	0
	FW	(England) ENG	Vic Keeble	28	17	25	16	3	1

=== Goalscorers ===
Place	Nationality	Position	Name	Third Division South	FA Cup	Total
1	(England)	CF	Vic Keeble	16	1	17
2	(Scotland)	IF	Johnny McKim	10	0	10
3	(England)	IF	Fred Cutting	9	0	9
4	(England)	CF	Kevin McCurley	6	0	6
4	(England)	IF	Augie Scott	4	2	6
6	(England)	WG	John Church	3	0	3
6	(Scotland)	WH	Jimmy Elder	2	1	3
8	(England)	WG	Peter Aitchison	2	0	2
8	(England)	CF	Arthur Turner	2	0	2
10	(Scotland)	WG	Adam Davidson	0	1	1
10	(England)	WH	Len Jones	1	0	1
10	(Wales)	FB	Trevor Rowlands	1	0	1
			Own goals	0	0	0
			TOTALS	56	5	61

=== Disciplinary record ===
Nationality	Position	Name	Third Division South		FA Cup		Total	
Nationality	Position	Name	Yellow card	Red card	Yellow card	Red card	Yellow card	Red card
(England)	CB	Reg Stewart	0	1	0	0	0	1
		TOTALS	0	1	0	0	0	1

=== Clean sheets ===
Number of games goalkeepers kept a clean sheet.

Place	Nationality	Player	Third Division South	FA Cup	Total
1	(England)	George Wright	9	0	9
2	(England)	Frank Coombs	5	0	5
		TOTALS	14	0	14

=== Player debuts ===
Players making their first-team Colchester United debut in a fully competitive match.

Position	Nationality	Player	Date	Opponent	Ground	Notes
FB	(England)	Phil Rookes	18 August 1951	Brighton & Hove Albion	Goldstone Ground	
IF	(England)	Augie Scott	18 August 1951	Brighton & Hove Albion	Goldstone Ground	
WG	(Scotland)	Adam Davidson	13 September 1951	Plymouth Argyle	Layer Road	
WG	(England)	Peter Aitchison	25 December 1951	Gillingham	Priestfield Stadium	
GK	(England)	Frank Coombs	8 March 1952	Bristol City	Ashton Gate Stadium	
WH	(England)	Ron Hunt	15 March 1952	Port Vale	Layer Road	
CF	(England)	Kevin McCurley	22 March 1952	Northampton Town	County Ground	
WG	(England)	Peter Wright	22 March 1952	Northampton Town	County Ground	

== See also ==
- List of Colchester United F.C. seasons
