= 1950–51 Colchester United F.C. season =

Colchester United
1950–51 season
- Chairman: Bill Allen
- Manager: Jimmy Allen
- Stadium: Layer Road
- Third Division South: 16th
- FA Cup: 1st round (eliminated by Bournemouth & Boscombe Athletic)
- Top goalscorer: League: Arthur Turner (13); All: Arthur Turner (15)
- Highest home attendance: 14,199 v Bournemouth & Boscombe Athletic, 7 September 1950
- Lowest home attendance: 6,941 v Gillingham, 16 December 1950
- Average home league attendance: 10,571
- Biggest win: 7–1 v Woodford Town, 11 November 1950
- Biggest defeat: 1–7 v Plymouth Argyle, 28 October 1950
Home colours

The 1950–51 season was Colchester United's ninth season, and their first ever in the Football League, competing in the Third Division South, the third tier of English football. The club ended the league season in 16th position. They also participated in the FA Cup, exiting in the first round following a defeat to Bournemouth & Boscombe Athletic.

== Season overview ==
Colchester's first ever game in the Football League was against their old Southern League rivals Gillingham at Priestfield Stadium on 19 August 1950. A crowd of 19,542 witnessed the 0–0 draw between the sides. Five days later, Bob Curry scored the U's first ever Football League goal during a 1–1 draw at Swindon Town, but it was not until 31 August that the Layer Road crowd was able to enjoy its first Football League goal for the home side. Arthur Turner, the season's top scorer with 15 goals, struck five minutes into a 4–1 win in the return game with Swindon. Colchester remained unbeaten in their first seven games, a run that equalled the record for new clubs entering the Football League set by Aberdare Athletic in 1921–22.

After occupying second position in the Third Division South table, the U's suffered a slump in form, losing nine of the next ten games. They finished the season in 16th position, averaging 10,571 through the Layer Road turnstiles. It would be the only season that Layer Road would host a five-figure season average.

== Players ==
As of match played 5 May 1951.

Name	Position	Nationality	Place of birth	Date of birth	Apps	Goals	Signed from	Date signed	Fee
Goalkeepers
George Wright	GK	(England)	Plymouth	10 October 1919 (aged 30)	54	0	(England) Plymouth Argyle	May 1949	£1,000
Defenders
George French	FB	(England)	Colchester	10 November 1926 (aged 23)	0	0	(England) West Ham United	February 1949	Free transfer
John Harrison	FB	(England)	Leicester	27 September 1927 (aged 22)	0	0	(England) Aston Villa	30 September 1950 (Note: Date of signing refers to the date of the player's first game for the club)	Nominal
Digger Kettle	FB	(England)	Colchester	3 June 1922 (aged 27)	150	1	(England) Arclight Sports	September 1946	Free transfer
Trevor Rowlands	FB	(Wales)	Wattstown	2 February 1922 (aged 28)	0	0	(England) Norwich City	20 July 1950	£1,000
Reg Stewart	CB	(England)	Sheffield	30 October 1925 (aged 24)	51	0	(England) Sheffield Wednesday	20 August 1949	£1,000
Midfielders
Harry Bearryman	WH	(England)	Wandsworth	26 September 1924 (aged 25)	146	9	(England) Chelsea	4 July 1947	Free transfer
Jimmy Elder	WH	(Scotland)	Scone	5 March 1928 (aged 22)	0	0	(England) Portsmouth	19 August 1950	£1,000
Len Jones	WH	(England)	Barnsley	9 June 1913 (aged 36)	0	0	(England) Southend United	19 August 1950	Undisclosed
John Moore	WH	(England)	Chiswick	25 September 1923 (aged 26)	13	0	(England) Brentford	8 September 1949	£1,000
Forwards
Bob Allen	WG	(England)	Bromley-by-Bow	11 October 1916 (aged 33)	89	6	(England) Gainsborough Trinity	13 June 1946	Free transfer
Peter Aitchison	WG	(England)	Harlow	19 September 1931 (aged 18)	0	0	Amateur	August 1950	Free transfer
John Church	WG	(England)	Lowestoft	17 September 1919 (aged 30)	0	0	(England) Norwich City	19 August 1950	£1,000
Dick Cullum	FW	(England)	Colchester	28 January 1931 (aged 19)	0	0	(England) Colchester Colts	28 March 1951	Free transfer
Bob Curry	IF	(England)	Gateshead	2 November 1918 (aged 31)	172	90	(England) Northampton Town	13 June 1947	Free transfer
Fred Cutting	IF	(England)	North Walsham	4 December 1921 (aged 28)	125	55	(England) Norwich City	6 December 1947	Free transfer
Dennis Hillman	WG	(England)	Southend-on-Sea	27 November 1918 (aged 31)	136	27	(England) Brighton & Hove Albion	21 September 1946	Free transfer
Vic Keeble	CF	(England)	Colchester	25 June 1930 (aged 19)	81	63	(England) King George Youth Club	23 May 1947	£10
Johnny McKim	IF	(Scotland)	Greenock	22 January 1926 (aged 24)	0	0	(England) Chelsea	19 August 1950	£1,000
Arthur Turner	CF	(England)	Poplar	22 January 1921 (aged 29)	117	83	(England) Charlton Athletic	September 1946	Free transfer

== Transfers ==
=== In ===
Date	Position	Nationality	Name	From	Fee	Ref.
20 July 1950	FB	(Wales)	Trevor Rowlands	(England) Norwich City	£1,000	
August 1950	FB	(England)	Bill Rochford	(England) Southampton	£1,000	
August 1950	WG	(England)	Peter Aitchison	Amateur	Free	
19 August 1950	WH	(Scotland)	Jimmy Elder	(England) Portsmouth	£1,000	(Note: Date of signing refers to the date of the player's first game for the club)
19 August 1950	WH	(England)	Len Jones	(England) Southend United	Undisclosed	
19 August 1950	WG	(England)	John Church	(England) Norwich City	£1,000	
19 August 1950	IF	(Scotland)	Johnny McKim	(England) Chelsea	£1,000	
30 September 1950	FB	(England)	John Harrison	(England) Aston Villa	Nominal	
30 September 1950	WH	(Scotland)	Joe Locherty	(England) Sheffield Wednesday	£1,000	
17 February 1951	GK	(England)	Barney Bircham	(England) Grimsby Town	£800	
26 March 1951	FW	(England)	Dick Cullum	(England) Colchester Colts	Free	

- Total spending: ▼ ~ £6,800

=== Out ===
Date	Position	Nationality	Name	To	Fee	Ref.
End of season	GK	(England)	Ken Whitehead	(England) Whitton United	Released	
End of season	WG	(England)	Stan Foxall	(England) Chelmsford City	Released	
End of season	CF	(England)	Denis Maffey	(England) Great Yarmouth Town	Free	
End of season	OL		Bob Neville	(England) Clacton Town	Released	
6 May 1950	FB	(England)	Doug Beach	(England) Chelmsford City	Free	(Note: Date of departure refers to the date of the player's final game for the club)
20 January 1951	WH	(Scotland)	Joe Locherty	(England) Scarborough	Released	
24 February 1951	FB	(England)	Bill Rochford	Retired	Retired	
24 March 1951	GK	(England)	Barney Bircham	Free agent	Released	
26 March 1951	WG	(Spain)	José Gallego	(England) Cambridge United	Released	
28 April 1951	WH	(England)	Bill Layton	(England) Harwich & Parkeston	Player-manager	

== Match details ==
=== Third Division South ===
==== Results round by round ====
Round	1	2	3	4	5	6	7	8	9	10	11	12	13	14	15	16	17	18	19	20	21	22	23	24	25	26	27	28	29	30	31	32	33	34	35	36	37	38	39	40	41	42	43	44	45	46
Ground	A	A	H	H	A	H	H	A	A	H	A	H	A	H	A	H	H	H	A	H	A	A	H	H	A	H	H	A	A	H	A	H	A	H	H	A	A	H	A	A	H	A	A	A	H	H
Result	D	D	D	W	W	W	W	L	L	L	L	L	L	D	L	L	L	W	D	W	D	D	L	W	L	D	W	D	L	W	L	L	L	W	W	L	L	W	L	L	W	D	L	W	D	D
Position	14	13	14	4	2	2	2	3	6	10	12	14	15	16	17	20	21	19	19	15	16	16	17	15	18	18	15	16	17	16	17	18	19	18	17	17	18	16	18	19	17	16	18	15	16	16

Source: 11v11.com 28 February 2016
A = Away; H = Home; W = Win; D = Draw; L = Loss

==== League table ====
Pos	Team	Pld	W	D	L	GF	GA	GAv	Pts
14	Exeter City	46	18	6	22	62	85	0.729	42
15	Walsall	46	15	10	21	52	62	0.839	40
16	Colchester United	46	14	12	20	63	76	0.829	40
17	Swindon Town	46	18	4	24	55	67	0.821	40
18	Aldershot	46	15	10	21	56	88	0.636	40

==== Matches ====
19 August 1950 1	Gillingham	0–0	Colchester United	Gillingham
		Report		Stadium: Priestfield Stadium; Attendance: 19,525

23 August 1950 2	Swindon Town	1–1	Colchester United	Swindon
	Millar 35'	Report; Report	Turner 24'	Stadium: County Ground; Attendance: 15,717

26 August 1950 3	Colchester United	0–0	Bristol Rovers	Colchester
		Report		Stadium: Layer Road; Attendance: 13,687

31 August 1950 4	Colchester United	4–1	Swindon Town	Colchester
	Turner 5', 40'; Curry 37'; Church 45'	Report; Report	Hudson 67'	Stadium: Layer Road; Attendance: 12,579

2 September 1950 5	Crystal Palace	1–3	Colchester United	Selhurst
	Thomas	Report	Turner 6'; Curry 14'; McKim 87'	Stadium: Selhurst Park; Attendance: 22,544

7 September 1950 6	Colchester United	4–1	Bournemouth & Boscombe Athletic	Colchester
	Turner; Curry	Report	Evans	Stadium: Layer Road; Attendance: 14,199

9 September 1950 7	Colchester United	4–1	Brighton & Hove Albion	Colchester
	McKim 16', 82'; Turner 38'; Jones 75'	Report	Reed 60'	Stadium: Layer Road; Attendance: 13,729

13 September 1950 8	Bournemouth & Boscombe Athletic	2–0	Colchester United	Bournemouth
	Haigh; McGibbon	Report		Stadium: Dean Court; Attendance: 18,452

16 September 1950 9	Newport County	2–0	Colchester United	Newport
	Parker	Report		Stadium: Somerton Park; Attendance: 16,021

23 September 1950 10	Colchester United	2–3	Norwich City	Colchester
	Curry; Cutting	Report	Gavin; Hollis	Stadium: Layer Road; Attendance: 13,843

30 September 1950 11	Northampton Town	2–1	Colchester United	Northampton
	Candlin; Dixon	Report	Locherty	Stadium: County Ground; Attendance: 10,160

7 October 1950 12	Colchester United	0–1	Exeter City	Colchester
		Report	Smith	Stadium: Layer Road; Attendance: 10,864

14 October 1950 13	Southend United	4–2	Colchester United	Southend-on-Sea
	Davies 2', 88'; Wakefield 6', 62'	Report; Report	Turner 59'; Curry 63'	Stadium: Southend Stadium; Attendance: 18,358

21 October 1950 14	Colchester United	1–1	Reading	Colchester
	Cutting	Report	Blackman	Stadium: Layer Road; Attendance: 11,469

28 October 1950 15	Plymouth Argyle	7–1	Colchester United	Plymouth
	Dews; Dougall; Govan; Strauss; Tadman	Report; Report	Curry 9'	Stadium: Home Park; Attendance: 20,845

4 November 1950 16	Colchester United	2–3	Ipswich Town	Colchester
	Turner; Church	Report; Report	Driver; McCrory; Wookey	Stadium: Layer Road; Attendance: 14,037; Referee: A. Blythe

18 November 1950 17	Colchester United	0–1	Walsall	Colchester
		Report	Chapman	Stadium: Layer Road; Attendance: 9,584

2 December 1950 18	Colchester United	3–0	Millwall	Colchester
	Curry; Church	Report		Stadium: Layer Road; Attendance: 9,695

9 December 1950 19	Leyton Orient	1–1	Colchester United	Leyton
	Sutherland	Report	Curry	Stadium: Brisbane Road; Attendance: 8,716

16 December 1950 20	Colchester United	4–2	Gillingham	Colchester
	Curry; Elder; Church	Report	Briggs; Thomas	Stadium: Layer Road; Attendance: 6,941

23 December 1950 21	Bristol Rovers	1–1	Colchester United	Bristol
	Petherbridge	Report	Jones	Stadium: Eastville Stadium; Attendance: 14,341

25 December 1950 22	Nottingham Forest	0–0	Colchester United	West Bridgford
		Report		Stadium: City Ground; Attendance: 20,111

26 December 1950 23	Colchester United	0–2	Nottingham Forest	Colchester
		Report	Ardron	Stadium: Layer Road; Attendance: 12,874

30 December 1950 24	Colchester United	1–0	Crystal Palace	Colchester
	Cutting	Report		Stadium: Layer Road; Attendance: 8,587

13 January 1951 25	Brighton & Hove Albion	3–1	Colchester United	Hove
	Keene; Thompson; Willard	Report	Allen (pen.)	Stadium: Goldstone Ground; Attendance: 11,699

20 January 1951 26	Colchester United	1–1	Newport County	Colchester
	Turner	Report	Birch	Stadium: Layer Road; Attendance: 8,230

27 January 1951 27	Colchester United	1–0	Aldershot	Colchester
	Elder	Report		Stadium: Layer Road; Attendance: 9,285

3 February 1951 28	Norwich City	1–1	Colchester United	Norwich
	Stewart 4' (o.g.)	Report	Keeble 74'	Stadium: Carrow Road; Attendance: 25,110

10 February 1951 29	Watford	2–0	Colchester United	Watford
	Garbutt; Varty	Report		Stadium: Vicarage Road; Attendance: 9,122

17 February 1951 30	Colchester United	2–1	Northampton Town	Colchester
	Curry 72'; McKim 81'	Report	Mitchell 14'	Stadium: Layer Road; Attendance: 7,048

24 February 1951 31	Exeter City	5–0	Colchester United	Exeter
	Regan; Smith; Unknown goalscorer	Report		Stadium: St James Park; Attendance: 7,268

3 March 1951 32	Colchester United	1–3	Southend United	Colchester
	Turner	Report; Report		Stadium: Layer Road; Attendance: 12,360

10 March 1951 33	Reading	3–2	Colchester United	Reading
	Amor; Blackman	Report	Turner; Church	Stadium: Elm Park; Attendance: 16,010

17 March 1951 34	Colchester United	3–0	Plymouth Argyle	Colchester
	Keeble	Report; Report		Stadium: Layer Road; Attendance: 8,746

23 March 1951 35	Colchester United	3–1	Torquay United	Colchester
	Turner; Elder (pen.); Keeble	Report	Shaw	Stadium: Layer Road; Attendance: 12,443

24 March 1951 36	Ipswich Town	3–0	Colchester United	Ipswich
	Driver; McCrory	Report; Report		Stadium: Portman Road; Attendance: 19,093; Referee: A. Blythe

26 March 1951 37	Torquay United	4–1	Colchester United	Torquay
	Evans; Pembery; Reid	Report	Cullum 37'	Stadium: Plainmoor; Attendance: 7,820

31 March 1951 38	Colchester United	1–0	Leyton Orient	Colchester
	Church	Report		Stadium: Layer Road; Attendance: 9,291

7 April 1951 39	Walsall	4–2	Colchester United	Walsall
	Hughes; Winter	Report	McKim	Stadium: Fellows Park; Attendance: 7,097

11 April 1951 40	Aldershot	2–0	Colchester United	Aldershot
	Bonnar; Raine	Report		Stadium: Recreation Ground; Attendance: 5,821

14 April 1951 41	Colchester United	4–1	Watford	Colchester
	Church; McKim; Keeble	Report	Thompson	Stadium: Layer Road; Attendance: 8,073

16 April 1951 42	Port Vale	1–1	Colchester United	Burslem
	Palk	Report	Elder	Stadium: Vale Park; Attendance: 8,520

21 April 1951 43	Millwall	2–0	Colchester United	New Cross
	Hurrell; Morgan	Report		Stadium: The Den; Attendance: 17,776

25 April 1951 44	Bristol City	0–2	Colchester United	Bristol
		Report	Rowlands 67'; Keeble 87'	Stadium: Ashton Gate Stadium; Attendance: 12,802

28 April 1951 45	Colchester United	1–1	Bristol City	Colchester
	Church	Report	Unknown goalscorer	Stadium: Layer Road; Attendance: 7,202

5 May 1951 46	Colchester United	1–1	Port Vale	Colchester
	McKim	Report	Barber	Stadium: Layer Road; Attendance: 8,414

=== FA Cup ===
11 November 1950 4th qualifying round	Woodford Town	1–7	Colchester United	Woodford
14:30	Bee 9'	Report	Turner; Layton; Curry; Cutting; Jones	Stadium: Snakes Lane; Attendance: 7,000

25 November 1950 1st round	Bournemouth & Boscombe Athletic	1–0	Colchester United	Bournemouth
	Boxshall	Report		Stadium: Dean Court; Attendance: 15,359

== Squad statistics ==
=== Appearances and goals ===
No.	Pos	Nat	Player	Total		Third Division South		FA Cup	
No.	Pos	Nat	Player	Apps	Goals	Apps	Goals	Apps	Goals
	GK	(England) ENG	George Wright	41	0	39	0	2	0
	DF	(England) ENG	John Harrison	33	0	31	0	2	0
	DF	(England) ENG	Digger Kettle	15	0	15	0	0	0
	DF	(Wales) WAL	Trevor Rowlands	15	1	15	1	0	0
	DF	(England) ENG	Reg Stewart	48	0	46	0	2	0
	MF	(England) ENG	Harry Bearryman	48	0	46	0	2	0
	MF	(Scotland) SCO	Jimmy Elder	46	4	45	4	1	0
	MF	(England) ENG	Len Jones	43	3	41	2	2	1
	FW	(England) ENG	Bob Allen	31	1	29	1	2	0
	FW	(England) ENG	John Church	42	10	40	10	2	0
	FW	(England) ENG	Dick Cullum	1	1	1	1	0	0
	FW	(England) ENG	Bob Curry	34	14	32	12	2	2
	FW	(England) ENG	Fred Cutting	12	4	11	3	1	1
	FW	(England) ENG	Dennis Hillman	4	0	4	0	0	0
	FW	(England) ENG	Vic Keeble	21	7	21	7	0	0
	FW	(Scotland) SCO	Johnny McKim	24	8	24	8	0	0
	FW	(England) ENG	Arthur Turner	38	15	36	13	2	2
Players who appeared for Colchester who left during the season
	GK	(England) ENG	Barney Bircham	7	0	7	0	0	0
	DF	(England) ENG	Bill Rochford	2	0	2	0	0	0
	MF	(England) ENG	Bill Layton	8	1	7	0	1	1
	MF	(Scotland) SCO	Joe Locherty	11	1	10	1	1	0
	FW	(Spain) ESP	José Gallego	4	0	4	0	0	0

=== Goalscorers ===
Place	Nationality	Position	Name	Third Division South	FA Cup	Total
1	(England)	CF	Arthur Turner	13	2	15
2	(England)	IF	Bob Curry	12	2	14
3	(England)	WG	John Church	10	0	10
4	(Scotland)	IF	Johnny McKim	8	0	8
5	(England)	CF	Vic Keeble	7	0	7
6	(England)	IF	Fred Cutting	3	1	4
6	(Scotland)	WH	Jimmy Elder	4	0	4
8	(England)	WH	Len Jones	2	1	3
9	(England)	WG	Bob Allen	1	0	1
9	(England)	FW	Dick Cullum	1	0	1
9	(England)	WH	Bill Layton	0	1	1
9	(Scotland)	WH	Joe Locherty	1	0	1
9	(Wales)	FB	Trevor Rowlands	1	0	1
			Own goals	0	0	0
			TOTALS	63	7	70

=== Clean sheets ===
Number of games goalkeepers kept a clean sheet.

Place	Nationality	Player	Third Division South	FA Cup	Total
1	(England)	George Wright	8	0	8
2	(England)	Barney Bircham	1	0	1
		TOTALS	9	0	9

=== Player debuts ===
Players making their first-team Colchester United debut in a fully competitive match.

Position	Nationality	Player	Date	Opponent	Ground	Notes
WH	(Scotland)	Jimmy Elder	19 August 1950	Gillingham	Priestfield Stadium	
WH	(England)	Len Jones	19 August 1950	Gillingham	Priestfield Stadium	
WG	(England)	John Church	19 August 1950	Gillingham	Priestfield Stadium	
IF	(Scotland)	Johnny McKim	19 August 1950	Gillingham	Priestfield Stadium	
FB	(England)	John Harrison	30 September 1950	Northampton Town	County Ground	
WH	(Scotland)	Joe Locherty	30 September 1950	Northampton Town	County Ground	
GK	(England)	Barney Bircham	17 February 1951	Northampton Town	Layer Road	
FB	(England)	Bill Rochford	17 February 1951	Northampton Town	Layer Road	
FB	(Wales)	Trevor Rowlands	3 March 1951	Southend United	Layer Road	
FW	(England)	Dick Cullum	26 March 1951	Torquay United	Plainmoor	

== See also ==
- List of Colchester United F.C. seasons
