= Frank McCourt (disambiguation) =

Frank McCourt (1930–2009) was an Irish-American teacher and writer.

Frank McCourt is also the name of:

- Frank McCourt (executive) (born 1953), American businessman, former owner of the Los Angeles Dodgers
- Frank McCourt (footballer) (1925–2006), Northern Irish footballer
