= James Elder =

James Elder may refer to:

- James Walter Elder (1882–1941), U.S. representative from Louisiana
- Jim Elder (equestrian) (born 1934), Canadian equestrian
- Jim Elder (politician) (born 1950), Australian politician
- Jimmy Elder (1928–2022), Scottish footballer
