= Leonard Jones =

Leonard Jones may refer to:

- Leonard Jones (politician), Canadian politician
- Leonard Jones (footballer), English footballer
- Leonard L. Jones, American architect
- John Lennard-Jones, British mathematician and professor of theoretical physics, known for the Lennard-Jones potential
- Leonard Jones (musician) from Levels and Degrees of Light

== See also ==
- Len Jones (disambiguation)
