= Ronald George =

Ronald George may refer to:

- Ronald M. George (born 1940), American jurist
- Ron George (politician) (born 1953), American politician, member of the Maryland House of Delegates
- Ron George (footballer) (1922–1989), English footballer who played for Crystal Palace and Colchester United
- Ron George (American football) (born 1970), American football player
