= Len Jones (disambiguation) =

Len Jones is an actor.

Len Jones may also refer to:

- Len Jones (footballer)
- Len Jones (sailor) in 2008 Vintage Yachting Games – Dragon

== See also ==
- Lenny Jones, character in The Bill (series 24)
- Leonard Jones (disambiguation)
