= Michael Kavanagh (disambiguation) =

Michael Kavanagh (born 1979) is an Irish hurler.

Michael Kavanagh may also refer to:

- Mike Kavanagh (born 1958), Church of England priest
- Micky Kavanagh (1927–2016), Irish association footballer

== See also ==
- Michael Cavanaugh (disambiguation)
- Michael Cavanagh (disambiguation)
