= The Hermoyne Apartments =

Historic apartment-hotel in Los Angeles, California

Coordinates: 34°4′51″N 118°19′39″W

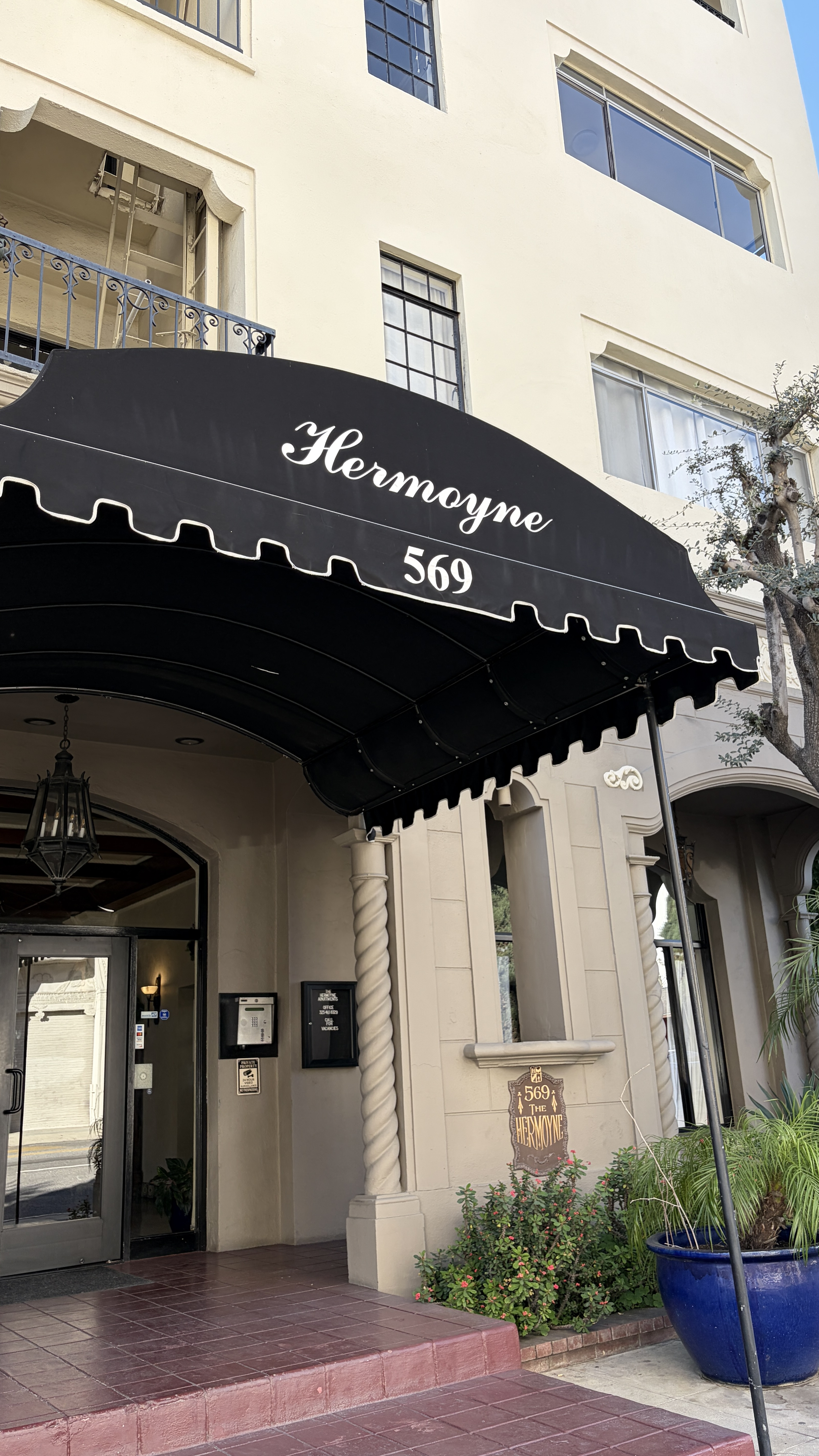
Front awning of the building.

The Hermoyne Apartments is a historic apartment-hotel in Los Angeles, California. It is located at 569 North Rossmore Avenue.

== History ==
The Hermoyne Apartments were erected in 1929 at the intersection of Rossmore Avenue and North Rosewood Avenue. Underwritten by Herbert "H.B." Squires, who owned a company that was "one of the largest purveyors of electrical equipment to the motion picture and other large industries in the 1920s." Initially, the building had 156 rooms and 54 apartments, with a seven-story facade that allegedly cost $425,000 to build. At that time, it offers the rare amenity of underground parking. The building was designed by San Francisco architect Leonard L. Jones, who also designed Hermoyne's "twin," Castle Argyle Arms at 1919 North Argyle Ave. as well as the Norton Flats.

== Legacy ==
The Hermoyne is still an operational residential apartment structure managed by Harrison Properties.
