= Fred Lewis (footballer, born 1923) =

English footballer

Personal information
- Full name: Frederick Arthur Lewis
- Date of birth: 26 July 1923
- Place of birth: Broughton Gifford, England
- Date of death: 1975 (aged 51–52)
- Place of death: Aylesbury
- Position: Full-back

Senior career*
Years	Team	Apps	(Gls)
1946	Aylesbury United	5	
1946–1953	Chelsea	23	(0)
1953–1955	Colchester United	89	(0)
- Headington United
Total		108	(0)
- * Club domestic league appearances and goals

Frederick Arthur Lewis (26 July 1923 – 1 July 1975) was an English footballer who played in the Football League as a full-back for Chelsea and Colchester United.

== Career ==
Born in Broughton Gifford, and subsequently brought up in Aylesbury Lewis signed for Football League club Chelsea from the Royal Navy after World War II in 1946. He had previously played for Aylesbury United in the English non-leagues.

After signing for Chelsea in March 1946, and with the Football League recommencing with a full programme for the 1946–47 season, Lewis made his First Division debut on 31 August 1946 in a 4–3 victory over Bolton Wanderers at Stamford Bridge. He would go on to make 33 First team appearances (include 10 appearances on Summer tours to Malta, Italy and Switzerland ) for the club between 1946 and 1953, spending the majority of his time with Chelsea in the Football Combination reserve team. He played his final match for the club on 30 August 1952 in a 2–0 home victory over Portsmouth.

Lewis joined Colchester United from Chelsea in July 1953 and made his debut on the opening day of the 1953–54 season in a 3–1 win over Torquay United at Layer Road. In two seasons with the club, Lewis played a total of 89 league games for the U's, failing to score. He played his final game for Colchester and his final professional game on the final day of the 1954–55 season, ironically against Torquay, but on this occasion, the result was a 2–1 win for Torquay. After leaving United, Lewis moved to non-league Headington United. After retiring from professional football Lewis became coach to Aylesbury United

Frederick Lewis died in 1975.
