= Castle Argyle Arms =

Apartment building in Hollywood, California, U.S.

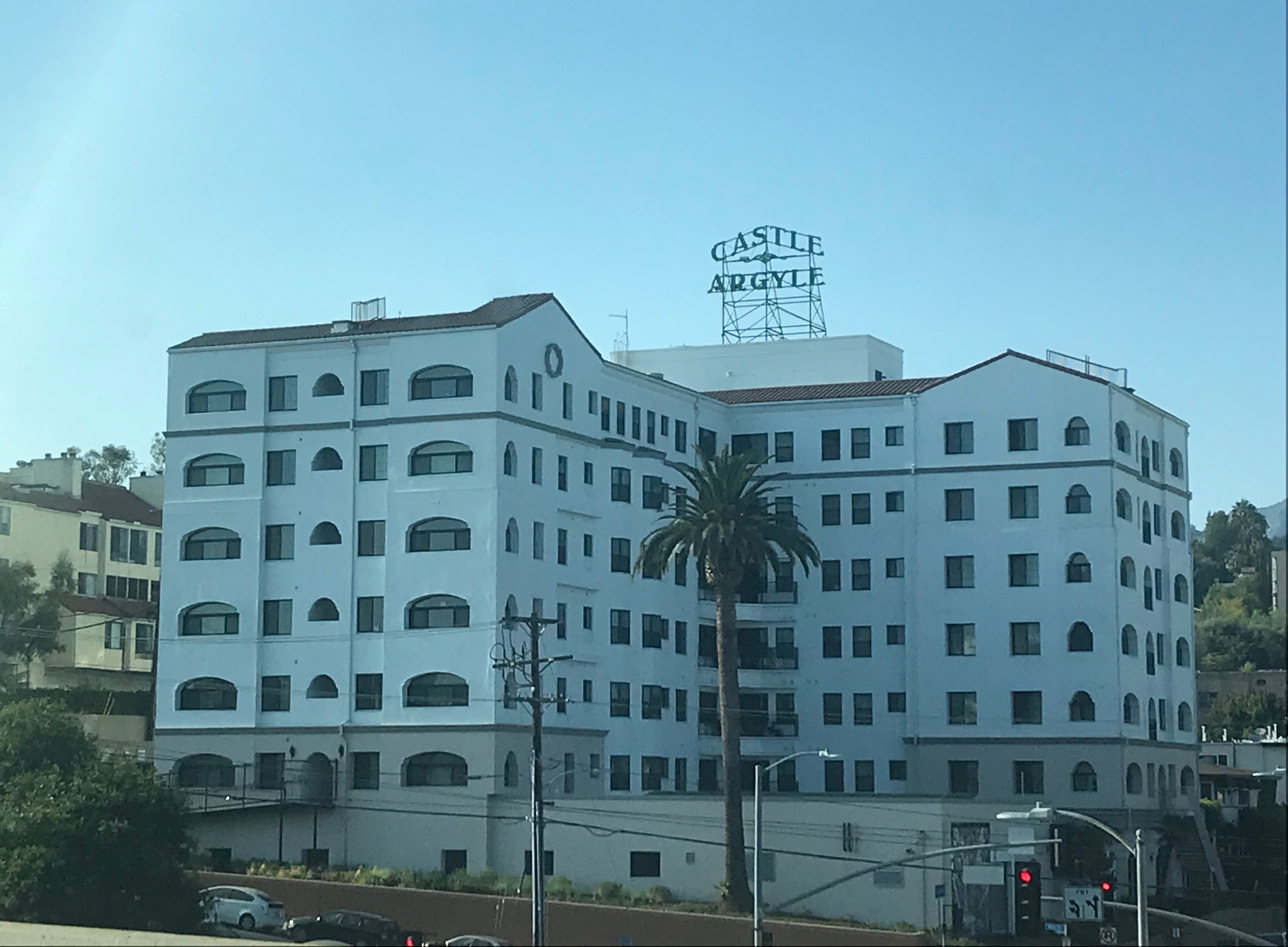
- The building in 2025
- Interactive map of the Castle Argyle Arms area

General information
- Architectural style: Italianate
- Location: 1919 Argyle Ave., Los Angeles, California
- Coordinates: 34.10592°N 118.32563°W
- Completed: 1928
- Governing body: Private

Design and construction
- Architect: Leonard L. Jones

Castle Argyle Arms is a historic seven-story luxury apartment building in Hollywood, California. It was designed by San Francisco architect Leonard L. Jones in 1928.

== History ==
In 1928, Dr. Alfred Guido Randolph "A. G." Castles demolished his personal estate, Sans Souci, on a three-acre plot at the intersection of Franklin Avenue and Argyle Avenue in Hollywood. In its place, he conscripted San Francisco architect Leonard L. Jones to design and construct the Castle Argyle Arms. Castles died five years later, but the Castle Argyle remained. After many decades of regular use, the building "deteriorated into a drug den" before being "broken up into small apartments for low-income tenants."

== Legacy ==
As of 2020, the Castle Argyle still stands and is marketed as affordable senior living. Its "twin," the Hermoyne Apartments, also designed by Leonard L. Jones, likewise remains standing.
