= Michael Cavanagh =

Michael Cavanagh or Cavanaugh may refer to:

- Michael Cavanaugh (actor) (born 1942), American television and film actor, notable for 24
- Michael Cavanagh (architect) (1860–1941), Australian architect
- Michael Cavanagh (judge) (1940–2025), American justice on the Michigan Supreme Court
- Michael Cavanaugh (musician) (born 1972), musician and actor, notable from musical Movin' Out
- Michael Cavanagh (drummer), Australian drummer for King Gizzard & the Lizard Wizard
- Michael J. Cavanagh (born 1966), American business executive
- Mike Cavanaugh (born 1968), American ice hockey coach and player

== See also ==
- Michael Kavanagh (disambiguation)
