= Adam Davidson (footballer) =

Scottish footballer (1929–2007)

Personal information
- Full name: Adam Richmond Davidson
- Date of birth: 28 November 1929
- Place of birth: Invergowrie, Scotland
- Date of death: September 2007 (aged 77)
- Place of death: Portsmouth, England
- Position: Winger

Senior career*
Years	Team	Apps	(Gls)
- Elmwood
	Sheffield Wednesday	0	(0)
1951–1952	Colchester United	19	(0)
- Carnoustie Panmure
Total		19	(0)
- * Club domestic league appearances and goals

Adam Richmond Davidson (28 November 1929 – September 2007) was a Scottish footballer who played in the Football League as a winger for Colchester United.

== Career ==
Born in Invergowrie, Davidson joined Football League club Sheffield Wednesday from Elmwood, but failed to make an appearance for the Owls. He moved to Colchester United in 1951, spending one season with the club and making 19 appearances. He made his debut on 13 September 1951 against Plymouth Argyle in a 1–0 win at Layer Road. He scored one goal for the club in the FA Cup against Bristol CIty on 15 December, a match which Colchester won 2–1. His final game came at the end of the 1951–52 season in a 1–0 home victory against Watford. He later returned to his native Scotland to play for Carnoustie Panmure. He died in Portsmouth in September 2007, at the age of 77.
