= Leonard L. Jones =

American architect

Leonard Lymon Jones (1881 - 1947) was an American architect known for his work in Los Angeles.

== Career ==
Jones was originally based in San Francisco, relocating to Los Angeles between 1912 and 1923. At varying times, his offices were situated in the Isaias W. Hellman Building in Downtown Los Angeles, the Pacific Electric Building, and the Gross Building.

== Works ==
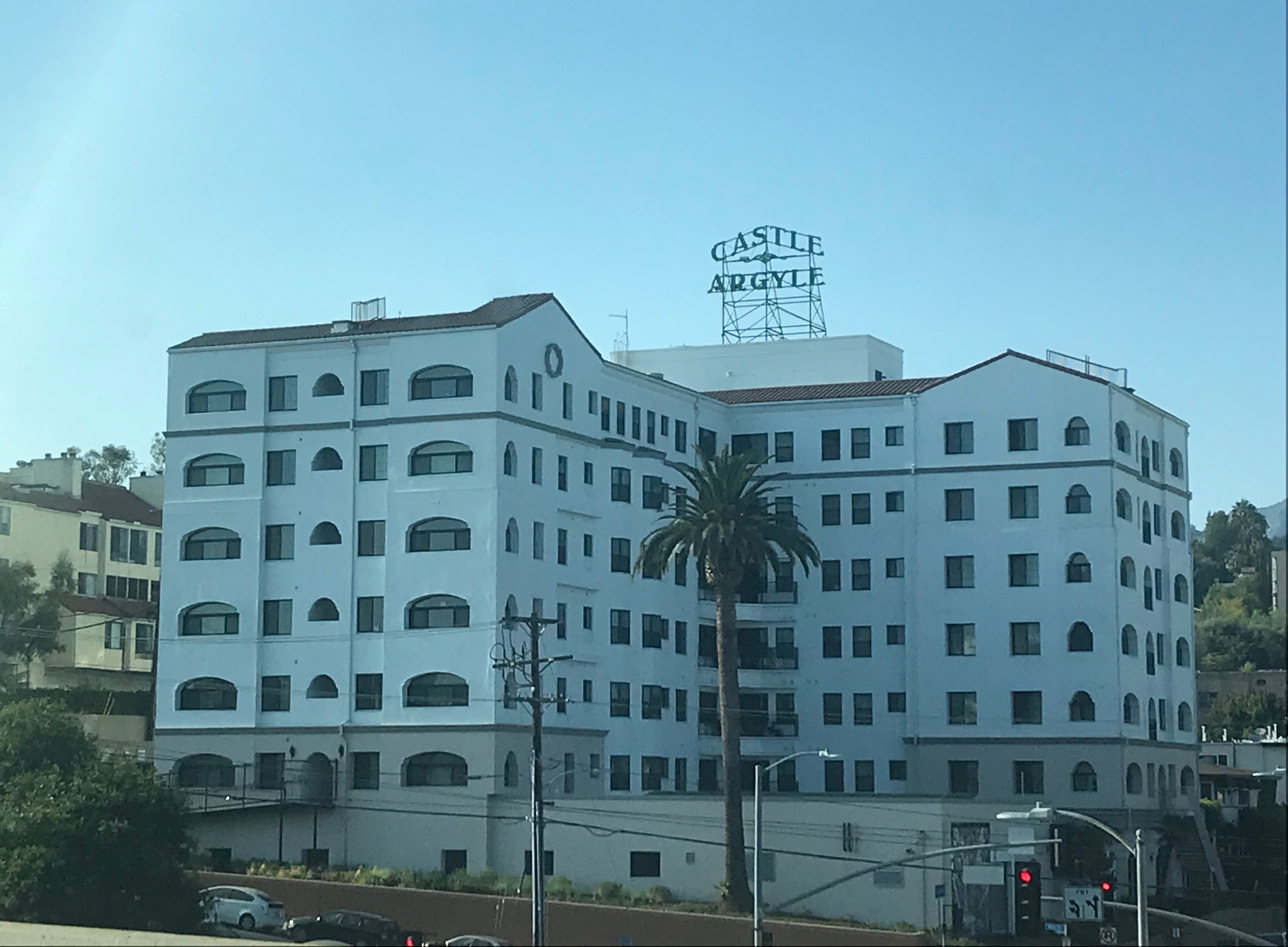
Castle Argyle Arms

Jones works include (all in Los Angeles):

- 2260 N. Edgemont St. (1921)
- 1615 Normandie Ave. (1923)
- Norton Flats (1924-1926)
- 2420 N. Canyon Dr. (1926)
- 1825 N. Kingsley Dr. (1927)
- Castle Argyle Arms (1928)
- The Hermoyne Apartments (1929)
- Frank Williams Residence (1935)
- Irving P. Krick Residence (1936)
- 2070-2074 N. Commonwealth Ave (1936)
- 456 N. Curson Ave. (1937)
- Edmund J. Beck Residence (1941)
