= George MacLuckie =

Scottish footballer

George McLuckie
Personal information
- Full name: George Robertson McLuckie
- Date of birth: 19 September 1931
- Place of birth: Falkirk, Scotland
- Date of death: 2011 (aged 79–80)
- Position: Winger

Senior career*
Years	Team	Apps	(Gls)
1952–1953	Blackburn Rovers	20	(2)
1953–1958	Ipswich Town	141	(24)
1958–????	Reading	85	(8)
- * Club domestic league appearances and goals

George McLuckie (19 September 1931 – 2011) was a Scottish professional footballer. During his career he made 141 appearances for Ipswich Town from 1953 to 1958.
