= Jimmy Kirk =

Scottish footballer (1925–2020)

Personal information
- Full name: James Kirk
- Date of birth: 12 November 1925
- Place of birth: Tarbolton, Scotland
- Date of death: July 2020 (aged 94)
- Position: Goalkeeper

Youth career
- Annbank United

Senior career*
Years	Team	Apps	(Gls)
1944–1951	St Mirren	86	(0)
1951–1954	Bury	79	(0)
1954–1955	Colchester United	32	(0)
1955–1956	Torquay United	39	(0)
1956–1957	Aldershot	5	(0)
- Tonbridge Angels
Total		242	(0)
- * Club domestic league appearances and goals

James Kirk (12 November 1925 – July 2020) was a Scottish footballer who played as a goalkeeper in the Scottish Football League for St Mirren and in the Football League for Bury, Colchester United, Torquay United and Aldershot. He died in 2020 at the age of 94.

== Career ==
Born in Tarbolton, Kirk began his career in Scotland with St Mirren, where he made 86 league appearances for the club, before moving to England to play for Bury, where he featured in 79 Football League matches.

Kirk joined Colchester United in 1954 and spent one season with the club, making his debut on 21 August, the opening day of the season in a 0–0 draw with Swindon Town at Layer Road. He made 32 appearances in total for the U's, playing his final game for the club on 28 April 1955 in a 2–2 home draw with Gillingham.

Kirk would then spend one season with Torquay United, making 39 league appearances before ending his Football League career by featuring five times for Aldershot. He retired from football following a spell with non-league Tonbridge Angels.
