= Jack Lewis (footballer, born 1919) =

English footballer

Personal information
- Date of birth: 26 August 1919
- Place of birth: Walsall, England
- Date of death: 2002 (aged 82–83)
- Position: Half-back

Youth career
- ?–1938: West Bromwich Albion

Senior career*
Years	Team	Apps	(Gls)
1938–1949	Crystal Palace	124	(6)
1949–1951	Bournemouth	25	(1)
1951–1953	Reading	74	(17)
1953–?	Kettering Town	?	(?)
- * Club domestic league appearances and goals

John Lewis (26 August 1919 – 2002) was an English professional footballer who played as a half-back in the Football League for Crystal Palace, Bournemouth and Reading. He also played non-league football for Kettering Town.

== Playing career ==
Lewis was born in Walsall and began his youth career with West Bromwich Albion. He signed for Crystal Palace in the 1938 close season and made his debut – and only senior appearance before the league was interrupted by the Second World War – in April 1939 against Bristol Rovers. Lewis became a first team regular in the 1946–47 season, when he was ever-present and made over 30 appearances in each of the next two seasons. His form was such that he was named in a London select XI to play in Brussels in 1948.

However, in November 1949, Lewis was transferred to Bournemouth for £7,500 where he remained until July 1951, when he joined Reading. Lewis spent two seasons with Reading before moving into non-league football with Kettering Town.

== Later career ==
After retiring as a player, Lewis became a publican.

Jack Lewis died in 2002, aged 82 or 83.
