= Paddy Leonard =

Irish footballer (1929–1975)

Personal information
- Full name: Patrick Desmond Leonard
- Date of birth: 25 July 1929
- Place of birth: Dublin, Ireland
- Date of death: 18 October 1975 (aged 46)
- Place of death: Harold's Cross, Dublin, Ireland
- Position: Forward

Senior career*
Years	Team	Apps	(Gls)
- Bath City
1952–1954	Bristol Rovers	14	(2)
1954–1955	Colchester United	34	(5)
- Tonbridge Angels
Total		48	(7)
- * Club domestic league appearances and goals

Patrick Desmond Leonard (25 July 1929 – 18 October 1975) was an Irish footballer who played in the Football League as a forward for Bristol Rovers and Colchester United. Leonard died in Harold's Cross on 18 October 1975, at the age of 46.

== Career ==
Born in Dublin, Leonard began his playing career in England with Bath City. From Bath, he was signed to Football League club Bristol Rovers, where he made 14 appearances in two years with the club, scoring two goals.

Leonard signed to Colchester United in the summer of 1954, where he spent one season. He played in 34 league games and scored five goals for Colchester, making his debut on 21 August 1954 in a 0–0 draw with Swindon Town. He scored his first goal in the following game at Exeter City in a 2–2 draw. His final goal came against Southend on 11 April 1955 in a 4–2 defeat at Roots Hall and made his final appearance on 4 May 1955 in a 2–1 away defeat to Torquay United.

After leaving Colchester, Leonard returned to non-league football with Tonbridge Angels.
