= Joe Locherty =

Scottish footballer

Personal information
- Date of birth: 5 September 1925
- Place of birth: Dundee, Scotland
- Date of death: 20 June 2000 (aged 74)
- Place of death: Dundee, Scotland
- Position: Wing half

Senior career*
| Years | Team | Apps | (Gls) |
- Newport
| 1947 | Lochee Harp | | |
| 1947–1950 | Sheffield Wednesday | 10 | (0) |
| 1950–1951 | Colchester United | 10 | (1) |
| 1951 | Scarborough | | |
| 1952–1953 | Scarborough | | |
| 1954 | Dundee United | 1 | (0) |
| Total | | 21 | (1) |
- * Club domestic league appearances and goals

Joseph Locherty (5 September 1925 – 20 June 2000) was a Scottish professional footballer. He played for Lochee Harp, Sheffield Wednesday, Colchester United, Scarborough and Dundee United.

== Playing career ==
Joe Locherty was born in Dundee on 5 September 1925 and played for Fife amateur team Newport A.F.C. before joining Dundee-based junior club Lochee Harp. He was only with Harp for a matter of months, playing in a few matches at the end of the 1946–47 season. At the beginning of the following season he was still signed with Harp, but was turning out for Newport. He joined Sheffield Wednesday in September 1947 after a successful trial. Signed as an inside forward, he initially struggled and was made available for transfer towards the end of his first season, but was then successfully converted into a wing-half by manager Eric Taylor. Given a first team opportunity as a result of an injury to Wednesday captain Doug Witcomb, Locherty made his Football League debut in a Second Division match against Bradford (Park Avenue) on 11 December 1948, playing at right-half. His initial success in the team meant that when Witcomb returned to fitness, the captain was moved to the left-half position to accommodate Locherty's continued inclusion. He went on to make ten League appearances for Wednesday.

Locherty left Sheffield Wednesday in July 1950 to join Colchester United, who were newly-elected to the Football League. He made his debut for them in a Third Division South match away to Northampton Town on 30 September 1950, scoring his first senior goal in a 2–1 defeat. His Colchester career again included ten League appearances, with that one goal scored.

Leaving Colchester after one season, Locherty dropped out of full-time football. Having taken a civilian job with the Royal Air Force at the Staxton Wold radar station in Yorkshire, he signed for local Midland League club Scarborough, on the understanding that he would be released if his work took him away from the area. He did leave shortly afterwards, but rejoined Scarborough in July 1952 after his work in the construction industry once again brought him back to the town.

After leaving Scarborough, Locherty returned to his home town of Dundee at New Year 1954 to work as an electrical welder. After training with Dundee United for several weeks, he signed for the club towards the end of the month and made his debut the following day, playing at left-half in a Scottish Football League B Division match at Motherwell on 23 January. Despite taking an early lead, United went on to lose 12–1, the club's all-time record defeat; Locherty never played for them again, and subsequently retired from football. He died in Dundee on 20 June 2000, aged 74.
