= Norton Flats =

Apartment complex in Los Angeles, California

General information
- Architectural style: Spanish Colonial Revival
- Location: North Norton Avenue, Los Angeles, California
- Completed: 1924, 1926
- Governing body: Private

Design and construction
- Architect: Leonard L. Jones

Norton Flats was a historic Spanish Colonial Revival courtyard apartment complex in Los Angeles, California. It was designed by San Francisco architect Leonard L. Jones and constructed in 1924 and 1926.

== History ==
Norton Flats was constructed in 1926 at North Norton Avenue in Los Angeles. Its erection was part of the post-war courtyard apartment boom in the United States. The Flats consisted of three two-story, four-unit buildings with rusty red clay roof tiles and double-hung windows. The buildings were arranged in a U shape around a central garden.

== Demolition ==
In March 2017, the apartments were nominated as a Los Angeles Historic-Cultural Monument following outcry over a demolition permit that was obtained for the property by developers Isaac W. Cohanzad and Michael Cohanzad of the Cohanzad Family Trust and their LLC, The Wiseman Group; residents had been evicted per the controversial Ellis Act, and the permit subsequently obtained. City councilperson David Ryu raised an emergency motion that the City Council consider the apartments for historic designation, and Council President Herb Wesson seconded the motion, wherein the remaining 14 councilpersons voted unanimously to hear the case. During the proceedings, Ryu noted that not only was the complex significant for the architectural movement to which it belonged, but also the "significant to Los Angeles as the home of Polish Jews who survived the Holocaust and came to the United States as refugees." By July 2017, however, the effort to save the Norton was foiled, and the complex was demolished.
