= Tommy Harris (footballer) =

English footballer (1924–2001)

Personal information
- Full name: Thomas Alfred Harris
- Date of birth: 8 November 1924
- Place of birth: Chelsea, London, England
- Date of death: 11 October 2001 (aged 76)
- Place of death: Chelsea, London, United Kingdom
- Position: Forward

Youth career
- Fulham

Senior career*
Years	Team	Apps	(Gls)
1951–1953	Leyton Orient	31	(11)
1953–1954	Colchester United	3	(0)
1954–1955	Tonbridge Angels		
1955–1956	Yiewsley		
1956–1957	Deal Town		
Total		34	(11)
- * Club domestic league appearances and goals

Thomas Alfred Harris (8 November 1924 – 11 October 2001) was an English footballer who played in the Football League as a forward for Leyton Orient and Colchester United.

== Career ==
Born in Chelsea, London, Harris began his career with local club Fulham, but after failing to break into the team joined Leyton Orient in 1951. He scored 11 goals in 31 league appearances for Orient before signing for Colchester United in 1953. He made his debut for the club on 10 October 1953 in a 3–0 home defeat by Coventry City. He played a further two games for Colchester with his final appearance coming on 5 December in a 1–0 victory over his former club Leyton Orient.

Harris left Colchester, later playing for Tonbridge Angels, Yiewsley and Deal Town in the non-leagues. He died on 11 October 2001 aged 76.
