= Dennis Pacey =

English footballer

Personal information
- Full name: Dennis Frank Pacey
- Date of birth: 28 September 1928
- Place of birth: Feltham, Middlesex, England
- Date of death: 23 September 2009 (aged 80)
- Place of death: Chertsey, Surrey, England
- Position: Striker

Senior career*
Years	Team	Apps	(Gls)
- Woking
?–1951	Walton & Hersham		
1951–1954	Leyton Orient	120	(46)
1954–1958	Millwall	132	(36)
1958–1959	Aldershot	32	(13)
- Dartford
- Yeovil Town
- * Club domestic league appearances and goals

Dennis Frank Pacey (28 September 1928 – 23 September 2009) was an English footballer who played as a striker, mainly for Leyton Orient, Millwall and Aldershot.

An ex-pupil of Strode's College, Pacey played for non-league sides Woking and Walton & Hersham before being signed by Leyton Orient in November 1951. He made his debut the following month in an FA Cup tie against Gorleston, and created an immediate impression by scoring a hat-trick in Orient's 5–4 win. He went on to break Orient's FA Cup goalscoring record, scoring 12 goals in all, a record which still stands as of 2011.

After three successful seasons, Pacey moved to Millwall and again scored on his debut. After scoring 36 goals in 132 league appearances for the Lions, he moved to Aldershot in September 1959, before moving back into non-league football.

Pacey later worked at Heathrow Airport before his retirement. He died in 2009, aged 80, after suffering an aneurysm outside a supermarket near his home in Chertsey.
