= Paddy Ratcliffe =

Irish footballer

Personal information
- Full name: Patrick Christopher Ratcliffe
- Date of birth: 31 December 1919
- Place of birth: Dublin, Ireland
- Date of death: March 1986 (aged 66)
- Place of death: Los Angeles, United States of America
- Position: Full back

Senior career*
Years	Team	Apps	(Gls)
1939–1946	Bohemians	69	(2)
1945–1946	Notts County	0	(0)
1946–1947	Wolverhampton Wanderers	2	(0)
1947–1955	Plymouth Argyle	236	(10)
- * Club domestic league appearances and goals

Patrick Christopher Ratcliffe (31 December 1919 – March 1986) was an Irish footballer who played as a full back.

His career as a professional started later than most because of the Second World War. He was injured in combat while serving for the Allies and spent two years in a Prisoner-of-war camp before returning home. After hostilities had ceased, he briefly played for Bohemians in his homeland before moving to England to join Notts County, and moved to Wolverhampton Wanderers less than one year later. Ratcliffe made two league appearances in the 1946–47 season before joining Plymouth Argyle, where he would eventually finish his career. A cultured, attacking full back, who was also a capable penalty taker, he made 246 appearances in all competitions for the Pilgrims between 1947 and 1955, scoring ten goals, before retiring from the professional game at the age of 35.

After leaving English football Paddy and his family decided to move to the United States. Paddy had married a Dublin woman named Olive Privett in 1946 and they set off for a new life in Los Angeles in 1957. They moved to the Lawndale area of Los Angeles with their four children (two girls and two boys) and Paddy began a career in the printing business, becoming print foreman of Palos Verdes newspapers and occasionally penning articles in its pages about football. Paddy also continued playing for a Los Angeles Danish side well after his 40th birthday, only hanging up his boots in 1962. He was also involved in coaching young American talent in football.
