= Barney Bircham =

English footballer

Personal information
- Full name: Bernard Bircham
- Date of birth: 31 August 1924
- Place of birth: Philadelphia, England
- Date of death: 11 October 2007 (aged 83)
- Place of death: Grimsby, England
- Position: Goalkeeper

Youth career
- Sunderland

Senior career*
| Years | Team | Apps | (Gls) |
| | Chesterfield | 0 | (0) |
| 1949–1950 | Grimsby Town | 8 | (0) |
| 1950–1951 | Colchester United | 7 | (0) |
| Total | | 15 | (0) |
- * Club domestic league appearances and goals

Bernard "Barney" Bircham (31 August 1924 – 11 October 2007) was an English footballer who played as a goalkeeper in the Football League for Grimsby Town and Colchester United.

== Career ==
Born in Philadelphia, Bircham began his career with Sunderland, where he failed to break into the first team, and moved on to Chesterfield, where he also failed to make an appearance.

In 1949, Bircham joined Grimsby Town, where he would make eight appearances, before joining Colchester United for a fee of £800. He made his debut in a 2–1 home victory over Northampton Town on 17 February 1951. He made seven league appearances for Colchester, his final appearance coming in a 3–0 away defeat to rivals Ipswich Town on 24 March 1951.

Barney Bircham died in Grimsby on 11 October 2007. He had two children, Geoffrey and Susan, and left behind wife Betty.
