= Peter Aitchison (footballer) =

English footballer (1931–2022)

Personal information
- Full name: Peter Munro Aitchison
- Date of birth: 19 September 1931
- Place of birth: Harlow, England
- Date of death: 11 August 2022 (aged 90)
- Place of death: Colchester, England
- Height: 5 ft 9 in (1.75 m)
- Position: Winger

Youth career
- 1950–1951: Colchester United

Senior career*
Years	Team	Apps	(Gls)
1951–1955	Colchester United	18	(2)
- Sittingbourne
- Haverhill Rovers
- Clacton Town
- Stowmarket Town
- Tiptree United
- Brightlingsea United
Total		18	(2)
- * Club domestic league appearances and goals

Peter Munro Aitchison (19 September 1931 – 11 August 2022) was an English footballer who played as a winger in the Football League for Colchester United. His younger brother Barrie also played professionally for Colchester.

== Career ==
Born in Harlow, Aitchison signed for Colchester United in August 1950 and signed a professional contract a year later, making his professional debut whilst still on national service. In the game against Gillingham on Christmas Day in 1951, Aitchison scored 17 minutes into his debut as the U's went on to record a 2–1 victory.

Ironically, Aitchison's final professional goal came the following day in the reverse fixture against Gillingham as Colchester recorded a 1–0 victory at Layer Road. Alongside his two goals, Aitchison turned out for Colchester 18 times, recording nine appearances during the 1951–52 season and three appearances in 1952–53. He failed to make an appearance during 1953–54 but returned making six appearances in 1954–55 before leaving for Sittingbourne. He would go on to represent Haverhill Rovers, Clacton Town, Stowmarket Town, Tiptree United and Brightlingsea United.

== Later life and death ==
Aitchison remained in the Colchester area following his retirement from the game, where he worked for BT until his retirement in September 1991. He died on 11 August 2022, at the age of 90.
