= Austin Dunne =

Irish footballer (1934–2007)

Personal information
- Date of birth: 31 July 1934
- Place of birth: Limerick, Ireland
- Date of death: 5 March 2007 (aged 72)
- Place of death: Tonbridge, Kent, England
- Position: Wing half

Youth career
- Garryowen Celtic
- Limerick

Senior career*
Years	Team	Apps	(Gls)
1950/1–1953	Limerick		
1953–1955	Colchester United	1	(0)
1956–1962	Tonbridge		
- * Club domestic league appearances and goals

Austin Dunne (31 July 1934 – 5 March 2007) was an Irish professional footballer who played in the League of Ireland for Limerick, and in England for Football League club Colchester United and Southern League club Tonbridge. Apparently he later played for Deal Town but details are sketchy.

== Career ==
Austin Dunne was born in Limerick on 31 July 1934. He signed for Limerick from Garryowen Celtic during the 1950–51 season, began his League of Ireland career as a 16-year-old centre forward, was described as "showing great promise and was proving a worthwhile addition to the side", and finished that season as the club's joint top scorer in league competition, albeit with only five goals. He represented Ireland in junior and youth international matches.

Dunne moved to England, where he signed for Colchester United in October 1953. It was 18 months before he made his first-team debut, playing at left half in a 2–1 defeat away to Gillingham in the Football League Third Division South on 9 April 1955. It was his only senior appearance. He left on a free transfer at the end of the 1955–56 season for Tonbridge of the Southern League, and over the next six years, scored 15 goals from 201 appearances in all competitions for the club. He also demonstrated his positional versatility: as well as the forward role that began his career and his "natural" position of wing half, he was often used at centre half.

Dunne moved to Deal Town during the 1964 /65 season.

Dunne was married to Anne née Englefield, whom he met while she was a student nurse at the hospital where his fractured wrist was being treated during the 1956–57 season. They had three children. Dunne died in Tonbridge on 5 March 2007 at the age of 72.
