= Frank McCourt (footballer) =

Northern Irish footballer

Personal information
- Full name: Francis Joseph McCourt
- Date of birth: 9 December 1925
- Place of birth: Portadown, Northern Ireland
- Date of death: 1 June 2006 (aged 80)
- Place of death: Liberty Lake, Washington, U.S.
- Height: 1.80 m (5 ft 11 in)
- Position: Wing half

Senior career*
Years	Team	Apps	(Gls)
1943–1944	Dundalk		
1944–1946	Shamrock Rovers		
1945–1950	Bristol Rovers	32	(1)
1947–1949	→ Shamrock Rovers		
1950–1954	Manchester City	61	(4)
1954–1955	Colchester United	12	(0)
1955–	Poole Town		
Total		105+	(5+)

International career
1951–1953	Northern Ireland	6	(0)
- * Club domestic league appearances and goals

Francis Joseph McCourt (9 December 1925 – 1 June 2006) was a Northern Irish footballer who played as a wing half for Dundalk, Shamrock Rovers, Bristol Rovers, Manchester City, Colchester United and Poole Town. He was born in Portadown.

McCourt was capped six times by Northern Ireland. He later moved to Washington, U.S., and died there in June 2006 at the age of 80.
