= Ron George (footballer) =

English footballer

Personal information
- Full name: Ronald Anthony George
- Date of birth: 14 August 1922
- Place of birth: Bristol, England
- Date of death: October 1989 (aged 67)
- Position: Full back

Senior career*
Years	Team	Apps	(Gls)
- Bristol Aeroplane Company
1948–1954	Crystal Palace	122	(2)
1954–1955	Colchester United	5	(0)
- Sudbury Town
- * Club domestic league appearances and goals

Ronald Anthony George (14 August 1922 – October 1989) was an English professional footballer. He played for Crystal Palace and Colchester United between 1948 and 1955, making 127 appearances in the Football League.

== Biography ==
Born in Bristol in 1922, George played for Western League club Bristol Aeroplane Company before being signed by Crystal Palace in February 1947. He played 122 league matches for Palace (scoring two goals) during six years at the club, before signing for Colchester on 16 January 1954. After playing only five matches for Colchester, he left the club on 5 February 1955, and signed for Sudbury Town.

He died in October 1989 in Colchester.
