= Chris Adams (footballer) =

English footballer (1927–2012)

Personal information
- Full name: Christopher James Adams
- Date of birth: 6 September 1927
- Place of birth: Hornchurch, England
- Date of death: 24 June 2012 (aged 84)
- Place of death: Brentwood, England
- Position: Outside left

Senior career*
Years	Team	Apps	(Gls)
- Leytonstone
1948–1952	Tottenham Hotspur	6	(1)
1952–1953	Norwich City	29	(3)
1954–1956	Watford	75	(5)
- Dartford
- * Club domestic league appearances and goals

Christopher James Adams (6 September 1927 – 24 June 2012) was an English footballer whose position was outside left.

== Playing career ==
Adams started his career playing for various local teams in Essex before joining Leytonstone.

He signed for Tottenham Hotspur as an apprentice in 1947, before turning professional the following year and playing in the top division of English football. After four years at Spurs he made a total of just six appearances. Although his solitary goal came on his debut in a win 5–0 victory over Derby County at White Hart Lane in March 1952.

Adams signed for Norwich in 1952 and went on to feature in 29 matches and found the net on three occasions.

His last professional club was Watford, whom he played for from 1954 until 1956 and making a further 75 appearances and netting five goals, when he was granted a free transfer by the Football League.

Adams ended his playing career with Southern Football League side Dartford where he netted 21 goals in 216 appearances before retiring in 1964.

Adams died on 24 June 2012 at the age of 84.
