= Ken Bainbridge =

English footballer

Personal information
- Full name: Kenneth Victor Bainbridge
- Date of birth: 15 January 1921
- Place of birth: Barking, England
- Date of death: June 2011
- Place of death: Waltham Forest, England
- Position: Winger

Senior career*
Years	Team	Apps	(Gls)
1946–1949	West Ham United	80	(16)
1949–1953	Reading	89	(32)
1953–1955	Southend United	78	(25)
1955–?	Chelmsford City		
Total		247	(73)
- * Club domestic league appearances and goals

Kenneth Victor Bainbridge (15 January 1921 – June 2011) was an English professional footballer who played as a left-winger in the Football League for West Ham United, Reading and Southend United.

Bainbridge played for West Ham United between 1946 and 1949. He scored on 11 seconds in a 2–1 win over Barnsley, the quickest recorded goal at Upton Park, in a Second Division game on 29 August 1949. He played a total of 83 league and cup games for the east London club, scoring 17 goals. He also recorded five goals in the war-time League South. He went on to play for Reading and Southend United, and later for Southern League club Chelmsford City.

== Death ==
He died in 2011, aged 90.
