= Micky Kavanagh =

Irish footballer

Personal information
- Full name: Michael Kavanagh
- Date of birth: 31 December 1927
- Place of birth: Dublin, Ireland
- Date of death: 29 November 2016 (aged 88)
- Place of death: Rustington, England
- Height: 5 ft 5 in (1.65 m)
- Positions: Outside left; inside forward

Youth career
- Stella Maris
- Johnville
- Bohemians
- 1944–1946: Hull City

Senior career*
Years	Team	Apps	(Gls)
1946–1948	Clonliffe Celtic		
1948–1950	Brighton & Hove Albion	26	(7)

Managerial career
- 195?–1960: Littlehampton Town
- * Club domestic league appearances and goals

Michael Kavanagh (31 December 1927 – 29 November 2016) was an Irish professional footballer who played as an outside left or inside forward in the Football League for Brighton & Hove Albion.

== Life and career ==
Kavanagh was born in 1927 in Dublin, and attended St Laurence O'Toole School, where Gaelic games were played but association football was not. He began his youthful football career with Stella Maris, Johnville and Bohemians, and as a 16-year-old, went to England for what proved a lengthy and ultimately unsuccessful trial with Hull City.

He returned to Dublin junior football, but another English trial in early 1948 led to a contract with Brighton & Hove Albion. He made his debut in November of that year, made 12 Football League Third Division South appearances in the 1948–49 season, and a further 14 in 1949–50. While playing for the reserve team at the start of the following season, Kavanagh suffered a knee ligament injury that forced him into retirement and was to cause him problems for the rest of his life.

He then worked as a capstan operator for a local engineering firm, and in his spare time coached Sussex County League team Littlehampton Town for eight years. Kavanagh died in Rustington, West Sussex, in 2016 at the age of 88.
