= Billy Reed (footballer) =

Wales international footballer (1928–2003)

Personal information
- Full name: William George Reed
- Date of birth: 25 January 1928
- Place of birth: Ynyshir, Wales
- Date of death: January 2003 (aged 74–75)
- Height: 5 ft 7 in (1.70 m)
- Position: Outside right

Youth career
- Wattstown BC

Senior career*
Years	Team	Apps	(Gls)
194?–1947	Rhondda Transport	0	(0)
1947–1948	Cardiff City	0	(0)
1948–1953	Brighton & Hove Albion	129	(37)
1953–1958	Ipswich Town	155	(43)
1958–1959	Swansea Town	8	(0)
1959–1960	Worcester City		(1)
1960	Abergavenny Thursdays		
1960–196?	Caerau Athletic		
- Milford United
- Ferndale Athletic

International career
1947	Wales amateur	2	(1)
1954	Wales	2	(0)
- * Club domestic league appearances and goals

William George Reed (25 January 1928 – January 2003) was a Welsh professional footballer who made nearly 300 appearances in the Football League and represented his country at schoolboy, amateur and senior level.

Reed played twice for the Wales amateur team while still a teenager. He turned professional with Cardiff City in 1947, but did not make his Football League debut until the following year with Brighton & Hove Albion. After five years and 132 appearances in all competitions, Reed signed for Ipswich Town. In four and a half seasons with Ipswich, he scored 46 goals from 169 matches, won Third Division South titles in 1953–54 and 1956–57, and became the first Ipswich player to be capped for his country at senior level when he played twice for Wales in 1954. After a short spell with Swansea Town, he finished his career in non-league football.

== Club career ==
William George Reed was born in Ynyshir, in Rhondda, Wales, on 25 January 1928. He represented Wales at schoolboy level, and played for the Wattstown Boys' Club before moving into senior football with Rhondda Transport. In 1947, he played twice for the Wales amateur team before turning professional with Football League Second Division club Cardiff City later that year. He never broke through to their first team, and signed for Brighton & Hove Albion of the Third Division South ahead of the 1948–49 season. By this time he was playing as an outside right rather than the inside-forward position of his early career. He made his Football League debut on Christmas Day 1948, filling in for Micky Kavanagh for the 1–1 draw away to Exeter City, and played in seven more matches that season, at outside left as well as outside right. He appeared in around half of Brighton's matches over the next two seasons, but was ever-present in 1951–52, becoming the team's joint top scorer (alongside Ken Bennett) with 19 goals as Albion finished in fifth place. Reed's relationship with the club was not a comfortable one, and he made several transfer requests before eventually moving to another Southern Section club, Ipswich Town, in July 1953 for a fee of £1750.

In his first season, Reed scored 13 league goals and earned himself a big reputation, to the extent that Charles Buchan, writing in the News Chronicle, opined that his absence from three of the last six fixtures with a freak injury – a strain caused when he crossed his legs while seated in a chair – would likely deprive his team of their lead in the table. It did not, and Ipswich won the Third Division South title. He became the first Ipswich Town to be capped at senior international level when he played for Wales against Yugoslavia in September 1954. Reed's league goal tally dropped to six as Ipswich were relegated straight back to the Third Division. In September 1955, he scored a second-half hat-trick and set up a goal for a team-mate to help his side beat Walsall 5–2, and finished with 12 goals from 30 league matches, but the season was marred by knee problems, culminating in a cartilage operation.

He missed a month early in the following season with a pulled thigh muscle, but played regularly once fit, and contributed ten goals to Ipswich's second Southern Section title. With moments left of that season's FA Cup third round tie at home to Fulham, Ipswich were losing 3–2 when they "launched an attack which ended with Billy Reed crashing the ball into the visitors' net", fractionally after the referee's final whistle. When the visiting supporters realised the goal did not stand, they laid siege to the referee's dressing room, but he had already left the ground on police advice. Reed played little in the 1957–58 Second Division season, and in February 1958 he signed for Swansea Town for a £3,000 fee. He made eight first-team appearances in what remained of the season, was restricted to the reserves during the next, and was transfer-listed by Swansea in April 1959.

Reed signed for Southern League club Worcester City, where he played alongside two other former international footballers, Roy Paul of Wales and Johnny Nicholls of England. The following January, he returned to Wales with Abergavenny Thursdays, with whom he won the Welsh League title and reached the semi-final of the 1959–60 Welsh Cup. He then signed for divisional rivals Caerau Athletic, for whom he played until at least December 1961, and also played for Milford United and Ferndale Athletic.

== International career ==
Reed represented Wales at schoolboy level, and in January 1947, was selected at inside right for the Wales amateur team to face England at Dulwich. The Western Mail's correspondent thought he had "a big future in front of him as an inside forward". He celebrated his 19th birthday with a goal as Wales came back from 2–0 down to draw the match 2–2, the first time for 18 years that the country had avoided defeat by England in an amateur international. His second appearance at that level came in March in a 4–1 loss to England at Newport.

In September 1954, Reed was selected to play for Wales against Yugoslavia. The first man capped at senior international level while an Ipswich Town player, he was reported to have had a good second half, but spent the night in a Cardiff hospital suffering from concussion. He retained his place for Wales' Home International against Scotland at Cardiff City's Ninian Park ground in October. The Sunday Mirror's reporter speculated that the injury sustained by Reed – a suspected broken nose – upset the Welsh attack, though the team's preference for dribbling rather than passing and the failure to switch John Charles from centre half to centre forward soon enough were more likely explanations for Wales' 1–0 defeat.

== Later life ==
Reed worked for a chemicals company and as a local government officer, as well as coaching in youth football and scouting for Wales national team manager Dave Bowen. He died in Swansea in January 2003.

== Career statistics ==
Appearances and goals by club, season and competition
Club	Season	League			FA Cup		Total	
Club	Season	Division	Apps	Goals	Apps	Goals	Apps	Goals
Cardiff City	1947–48	Second Division	0	0	0	0	0	0
Brighton & Hove Albion	1948–49	Third Division South	8	0	0	0	8	0
Brighton & Hove Albion	1949–50	Third Division South	21	1	0	0	21	1
Brighton & Hove Albion	1950–51	Third Division South	25	7	0	0	25	7
Brighton & Hove Albion	1951–52	Third Division South	46	19	1	0	47	19
Brighton & Hove Albion	1952–53	Third Division South	29	10	2	1	31	11
Brighton & Hove Albion	Total		129	37	3	1	132	38
Ipswich Town	1953–54	Third Division South	41	13	7	2	48	15
Ipswich Town	1954–55	Second Division	40	6	2	1	42	7
Ipswich Town	1955–56	Third Division South	30	12	1	0	31	12
Ipswich Town	1956–57	Third Division South	37	10	3	0	40	10
Ipswich Town	1957–58	Second Division	7	2	1	0	8	2
Ipswich Town	Total		155	43	14	3	169	46
Swansea Town	1957–58	Second Division	8	0	—		8	0
Career total			292	80	17	4	309	84
