= Dick Cullum =

English footballer

Personal information
- Full name: Arthur Richard Cullum
- Date of birth: 28 January 1931
- Place of birth: Colchester, England
- Date of death: 9 April 2012 (aged 81)
- Place of death: Hemel Hempstead, England
- Position: Forward

Youth career
- Colchester United

Senior career*
Years	Team	Apps	(Gls)
1951–1954	Colchester United	2	(1)
- Sittingbourne
Total		2	(1)
- * Club domestic league appearances and goals

Arthur Richard Cullum (28 January 1931 – 9 April 2012) was an English footballer who played in the Football League as a forward for Colchester United.

== Career ==
Born in Colchester, Cullum signed for hometown club Colchester United from amateur football as a youth. He made his first team debut for Colchester aged 20 on 26 March 1951, Colchester's first season in the Football League. He scored on his debut in the 4–1 defeat to Torquay United. He made one further first team appearance for Colchester on 23 January 1954 in a 3–0 away defeat to Aldershot. He played for Sittingbourne after leaving Colchester.

== Personal life ==
Outside the game, Cullum was apprenticed to Benham & Co in his hometown as a teenager (his Dad wouldn't let him sign full-time professional saying 'no footballer has ever earned good money'. After becoming assistant works manager in his thirties he took a similar role next door at QB Printers, before setting up a typesetting business Wolf Composition in Watford in 1970. In later working life, he was managing director of another typesetting business, Santype International in Salisbury, building it to be the largest technical typesetting company in the country. He died aged 81 on 9 April 2012. He had three sons, Steven, Gary and Dale.
