= Trevor Rowlands =

Welsh footballer

Personal information
- Full name: Trevor Ivor Rowlands
- Date of birth: 2 February 1922
- Place of birth: Wattstown, Rhondda, Wales
- Date of death: 22 July 1973 (aged 51)
- Place of death: Norwich, England
- Height: 5 ft 10 in (1.78 m)
- Position: Full-back

Senior career*
Years	Team	Apps	(Gls)
- Cardiff Nomads
1945–1946	Cardiff City		
1946–1950	Norwich City	10	(2)
1950–1953	Colchester United	46	(4)
- Lovell's Athletic
- Great Yarmouth Town
Total		56	(6)
- * Club domestic league appearances and goals

Trevor Ivor Rowlands (2 February 1922 – 22 July 1973) was a Welsh footballer who played in the Football League as a full-back for Norwich City and Colchester United.

== Career ==
Born in Wattstown, Wales, Rowlands began his career with Cardiff Nomads. He had featured for Wales at schoolboy level, and later secured a move to Football League club Cardiff City, where he made one appearance in the transitional 1945–46 season following World War II. He signed for Norwich City on 16 August 1946, becoming a reserve-team regular, amassing 103 appearances and 11 goals. Rowlands would go on to make ten first-team appearances in the Football League for City, scoring two goals, both of which came against Crystal Palace in September 1949.

On 20 July 1950, Rowlands signed for Colchester United, who had just been elected to the Football League for the first time, for a fee of £1,000. With the U's, Rowlands made 46 league appearances and scored four goals after making his debut in the Essex derby against Southend United as Colchester suffered a 3–1 home defeat on 3 March 1951. In March 1952, he scored his only goal of the season playing as a centre forward against rivals Ipswich Town, securing a 1–0 win for Colchester in front of a 15,000-strong crowd at Layer Road.

Rowlands briefly turned out for Lovell's Athletic before moving to Great Yarmouth Town, where he would make nearly 200 appearances. He also featured in the club's 1953–54 FA Cup side that defeated Third Division South Crystal Palace.

Trevor Rowlands died on 22 July 1973 following a tragic construction site accident.
