= Cliff Birch =

Welsh footballer

Personal information
- Full name: Clifford Birch
- Date of birth: 1 September 1928
- Place of birth: Newport, Wales
- Date of death: 3 March 1990 (aged 61)
- Position: Winger

Senior career*
Years	Team	Apps	(Gls)
?–1949	Ebbw Vale	?	(?)
1949–1950	Norwich City	5	(3)
1950–1954	Newport County	142	(28)
1954–1955	Colchester United	12	(3)
1955–?	Spalding United	?	(?)
- * Club domestic league appearances and goals

Clifford "Cliff" Birch (1 September 1928 – 3 March 1990) was a Welsh professional footballer.

Birch was born in Newport, Monmouthshire. A right-winger, he began his career with Ebbw Vale and joined Norwich in 1949. In 1950 he joined Newport County and made 142 English Football League appearances for the club, scoring 28 goals. In 1954 he moved to Colchester United and later to Spalding United.

Birch died of a heart attack on 3 March 1990, aged 61.
