= Len Jones (footballer) =

English footballer (1913-1998)

Personal information
- Full name: Leonard Jones
- Date of birth: 9 June 1913
- Place of birth: Barnsley, England
- Date of death: March 1998 (aged 84)
- Place of death: Chelmsford, England
- Height: 5 ft 8 1/2 in (1.74 m)
- Position: Wing half

Senior career*
Years	Team	Apps	(Gls)
- Wombwell
1932–1933	Huddersfield Town		
1933–1938	Barnsley	51	(1)
1938–1939	Chelmsford City		
1939–1949	Plymouth Argyle	40	(2)
1949–1950	Southend United	29	(0)
1950–1953	Colchester United	71	(3)
1953–1954	Ipswich Town	0	(0)
Total		191	(6)
- * Club domestic league appearances and goals

Leonard Jones (9 June 1913 – March 1998) was an English footballer who played in the Football League as a wing half for Barnsley, Plymouth Argyle, Southend United and Colchester United. He also was signed to but failed to make a first-team appearance for Huddersfield Town and Ipswich Town.

== Career ==
Born in Barnsley, Jones played for local amateur club Wombwell before joining up with Football League club Huddersfield Town in the First Division. He found first-team opportunities hard to come by, signing for Barnsley where he made his league debut. During his stay at Oakwell, Jones played in 51 league games for the club, scoring once prior to dropping out of the Football League in 1938 to play for ambitious Southern League team Chelmsford City, where he stayed until signing for Plymouth Argyle in 1939.

Jones made his debut for the Pilgrims on 26 August 1939, his only league appearance for the club prior to World War II, during a 3–1 defeat at home to West Ham United. During the war years, he was allocated work at Marconi in Essex and played as a guest for Fulham throughout the war years. He returned to Plymouth for the 1945–46 season, making his second debut on 25 August 1945 in a 5–5 away draw with Southampton in the Football League South and made 29 appearances before resuming play in the Second Division in 1946–47. He made 24 league appearances during that season, and made 14 appearances in the following season, scoring his first goal in a home match against Bradford Park Avenue on 1 May 1948. After falling out of favour at Home Park and making just one appearance in the 1948–49 season, a game in which he scored in a 6–1 defeat to Fulham, he joined Southend United.

Southend signed Jones in August 1949, and he went on to make 29 appearances for the Shrimpers in the Football League during his single season with the club. He then moved to Essex neighbours and newly elected to the Football League Colchester United in summer 1950. He made his debut for the U's in their first-ever Football League match, a 0–0 away draw with Gillingham on 19 August 1950. He scored his first goal in a 4–1 win over Brighton & Hove Albion at Layer Road on 9 September 1950. Jones played 71 games for Colchester, scoring three goals, with his last goal coming in a 5–1 defeat at Brighton on 18 August 1951.

A 3–1 defeat to Crystal Palace at Selhurst Park on 4 April 1953 saw Jones make his final appearance for Colchester. This was also to be his final professional game. He joined Ipswich Town in 1953, making 27 reserve team appearances but failed to play a game for the first-team.

Len Jones died in Chelmsford in March 1998.
