= Frank Coombs (footballer) =

English footballer

Personal information
- Full name: Francis Henry Coombs
- Date of birth: 24 April 1925
- Place of birth: East Ham, England
- Date of death: April 1998 (aged 72–73)
- Place of death: Colchester, England
- Position: Goalkeeper

Senior career*
Years	Team	Apps	(Gls)
?–1949	Dartford	?	(?)
1949–1950	Bristol City	24	(0)
1950–1951	Southend United	20	(0)
1951–1954	Colchester United	38	(0)
1954–?	Gravesend & Northfleet	?	(?)
- * Club domestic league appearances and goals as of 00:47, 12 May 2011

Francis Henry "Frank" Coombs (24 April 1925 – April 1998) was a former professional footballer. Coombs was born in East Ham, Essex and played as a goalkeeper for Football League clubs Bristol City, Southend United and Colchester United. He died in 1998.
