= John Church (footballer) =

English footballer

Personal information
- Date of birth: 17 September 1919
- Place of birth: Lowestoft, England
- Date of death: 10 September 2004 (aged 84)
- Place of death: Lowestoft, England
- Position: Left winger

Senior career*
Years	Team	Apps	(Gls)
1936–1937	Lowestoft Town	?	(?)
1937–1950	Norwich City	110	(16)
1950–1954	Colchester United	118	(20)
1950–1951	Crittall Athletic	37	(8)
Total		265	(44)
- * Club domestic league appearances and goals

John Church (17 September 1919 in Lowestoft, Norfolk, England – 10 September 2004), is an English retired footballer who played as a left winger in the Football League.
