= Jimmy Elder =

Scottish footballer (1928–2022)

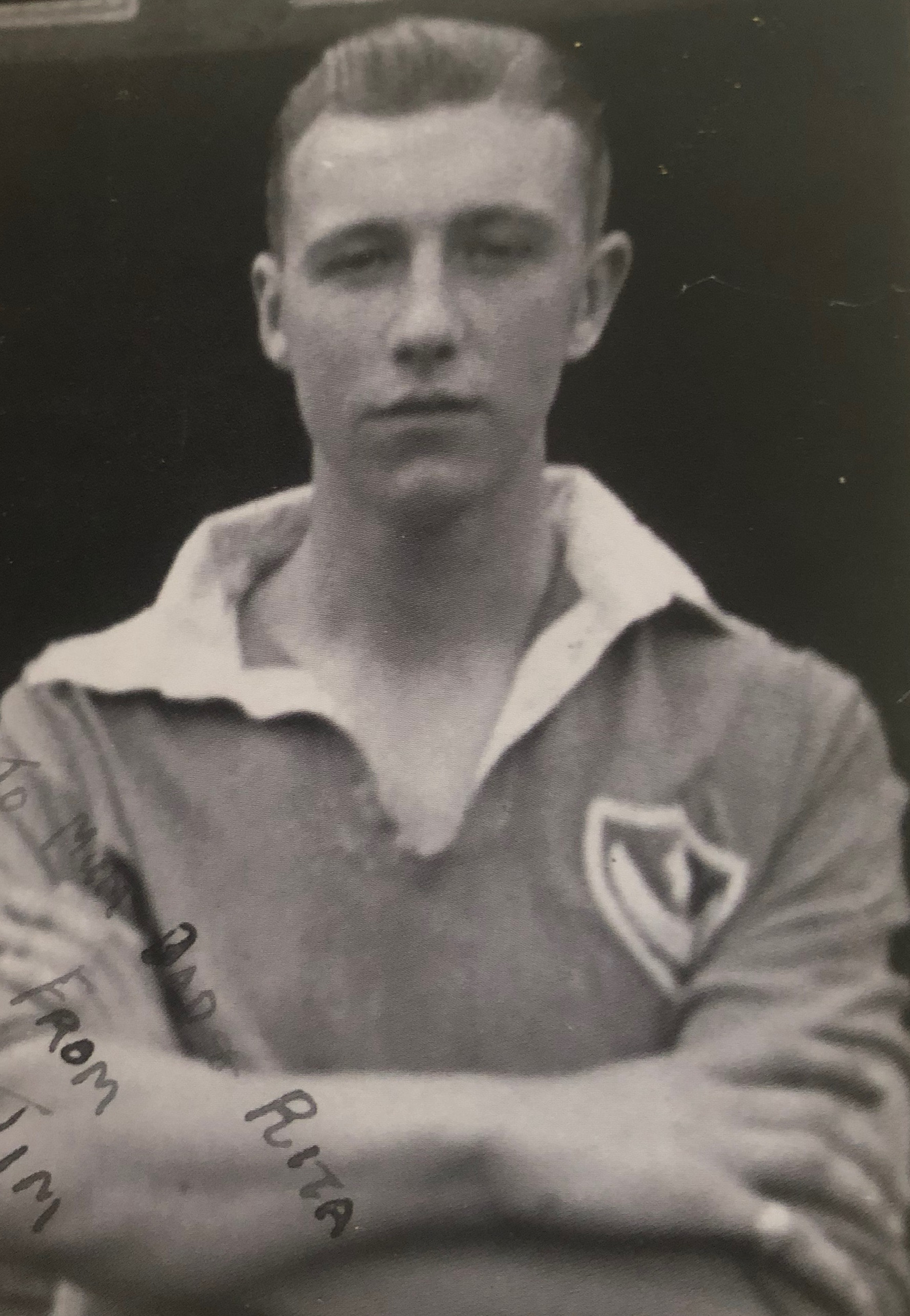

Personal information
- Full name: James Elder
- Date of birth: 5 March 1928
- Place of birth: Scone, Scotland
- Date of death: September 2022 (aged 94)
- Position: Wing half

Senior career*
Years	Team	Apps	(Gls)
–1947	Jeanfield Swifts		
1947–1950	Portsmouth	1	(0)
1950–1955	Colchester United	199	(15)
1955–1958	Yeovil Town	126	(22)
- * Club domestic league appearances and goals

James Elder (5 March 1928 – September 2022) was a Scottish professional footballer who played as a wing half for Football League club Portsmouth, where he was part of the squad that went on to win the Division 1 Championship and Colchester United, where he made over 200 appearances and scoring 17 goals. Jimmy was a hard-hitting wing-half who could play with both feet. Jimmy was also a regular penalty-taker.

He died in September 2022, at the age of 94. He was the last remaining member of Portsmouth's famous title-winning squad of 1948–49 and 1949–50.

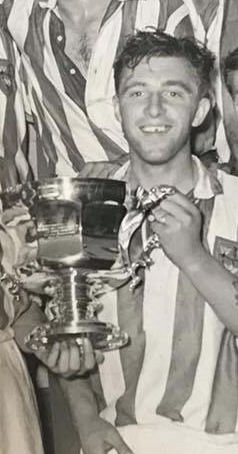
Jimmy Elder after winning the Exeter Cup with Colchester United
