= 1949–50 Colchester United F.C. season =

Colchester United
1949–50 season
- Chairman: Bill Allen
- Manager: Jimmy Allen
- Stadium: Layer Road
- Southern League: 2nd Elected to the Football League
- FA Cup: 4th qualifying round (eliminated by Wealdstone)
- Southern League Cup: Winners
- Top goalscorer: League: Vic Keeble (42); All: Vic Keeble (46)
- Highest home attendance: 14,718 v Chelmsford City, 17 September 1949
- Lowest home attendance: 5,352 v Cheltenham Town, 23 March 1950
- Average home league attendance: 8,639
- Biggest win: 8–0 v Kidderminster Harriers, 19 November 1949
- Biggest defeat: 0–5 v Merthyr Tydfil, 26 April 1950; 1–6 v Gillingham, 29 April 1950
Home colours

The 1949–50 season was Colchester United's eighth season in their history and their eighth and final season in the Southern League. Alongside competing in the Southern League, the club also participated in the FA Cup and Southern League Cup. The club finished as runner-up to Merthyr Tydfil in the league, but despite this Colchester were elected to the Football League at the end of the campaign with the expansion of the League from 88 to 92 clubs. The club won the Southern League Cup 6–4 on aggregate, while they exited the FA Cup at the fourth qualifying round stage following a 1–0 defeat by Wealdstone.

== Season overview ==
Layer Road suffered storm damage ahead of the 1949–50 season, and owing to a shortage of steel, re-construction work was not complete as the season commenced. Manager Jimmy Allen strengthened his defence with the signing of Reg Stewart from Sheffield Wednesday and Bill Layton from Bradford Park Avenue, and by Christmas 1949, Colchester had lost just three of their 28 games played, one of which was the 1–0 FA Cup fourth qualifying round defeat to Wealdstone. The game was one of the first FA Cup ties to be broadcast on television, but on this occasion it was the U's who were on the receiving end of a cup shock.

Colchester had topped the table all season until a fixture-congested April, which saw them held to home draws by Torquay United Reserves and Gravesend & Northfleet, while suffering 5–0 and 6–1 defeats at main title rivals Merthyr Tydfil and Gillingham in the space of three days. Between those defeats, the U's had recovered some pride with a 3–0 Southern League Cup final first-leg win over Bath City. Competing in their fourth match in just five days, a weary Colchester side allowed Bath to lead the second-leg 4–1, meaning the tie would go to extra time. Vic Keeble and Dennis Hillman scored in the added 30-minutes, helping Colchester lift the trophy for the second time with their third final appearance in 3 years.

With Gillingham having defeated Merthyr Tydfil during midweek, all Colchester needed to do in their final fixture was to win at Barry Town to secure the title. However, they were held to a goalless draw and Merthyr Tydfil took the title on goal average. Despite this, Vic Keeble had been the club's top scorer with 46 goals, a record which remains intact. Supplementing this were Fred Cutting's 24 goal haul and Bob Curry's 22, while fellow forward Arthur Turner had spent the majority of the season out injured with cartilage damage.

On 3 June 1950, only Everton and West Bromwich Albion opposed the expansion of the Football League from 88 to 92 clubs by expanding the Third Division North and South, instead preferring another regional league. Of the applications for Third Division South election, Gillingham polled 44 votes, Colchester 28, Worcester City 11, Chelmsford City 8, Peterborough United 5 and Merthyr Tydfil and Yeovil Town just one vote each. Colchester United were elected to the Football League with a Supporters Club membership of over 16,000 and an average gate of over 8,500.

== Players ==
As of match played 6 May 1950.

| Name | Position | Nationality | Place of birth | Date of birth | Apps | Goals | Signed from | Date signed | Fee |
Goalkeepers
| Ken Whitehead | GK | (England) | | 1 September 1925 (aged 23) | 38 | 0 | (England) Clacton Town | May 1948 | Free transfer |
| George Wright | GK | (England) | Plymouth | 10 October 1919 (aged 29) | 2 | 0 | (England) Plymouth Argyle | May 1949 | £1,000 |
Defenders
| Doug Beach | FB | (England) | Watford | 2 February 1920 (aged 29) | 0 | 0 | (England) Southend United | 8 October 1949 (Note: Date of signing refers to the date of the player's first game in his second spell for the club) | Free transfer |
| George French | FB | (England) | Colchester | 10 November 1926 (aged 22) | 0 | 0 | (England) West Ham United | February 1949 | Free transfer |
| Digger Kettle | FB | (England) | Colchester | 3 June 1922 (aged 26) | 106 | 1 | (England) Arclight Sports | September 1946 | Free transfer |
| Reg Stewart | CB | (England) | Sheffield | 30 October 1925 (aged 23) | 0 | 0 | (England) Sheffield Wednesday | 20 August 1949 (Note: Date of signing refers to the date of the player's first game for the club) | £1,000 |
Midfielders
| Harry Bearryman | WH | (England) | Wandsworth | 26 September 1924 (aged 24) | 94 | 5 | (England) Chelsea | 4 July 1947 | Free transfer |
| Bill Layton | WH | (England) | Shirley | 13 January 1915 (aged 34) | 0 | 0 | (England) Bradford Park Avenue | August 1949 | £800 |
| John Moore | WH | (England) | Chiswick | 25 September 1923 (aged 25) | 0 | 0 | (England) Brentford | 8 September 1949 | £1,000 |
Forwards
| Bob Allen | WG | (England) | Bromley-by-Bow | 11 October 1916 (aged 32) | 72 | 3 | (England) Gainsborough Trinity | 13 June 1946 | Free transfer |
| Bob Curry | IF | (England) | Gateshead | 2 November 1918 (aged 30) | 130 | 68 | (England) Northampton Town | 13 June 1947 | Free transfer |
| Fred Cutting | IF | (England) | North Walsham | 4 December 1921 (aged 27) | 73 | 31 | (England) Norwich City | 6 December 1947 | Free transfer |
| Stan Foxall | WG | (England) | Crowle | 8 September 1914 (aged 34) | 35 | 11 | (England) West Ham United | June 1948 | Free transfer |
| José Gallego | WG | (Spain) | San Sebastián | 8 April 1923 (aged 26) | 0 | 0 | (England) Southampton | July 1949 | Free transfer |
| Dennis Hillman | WG | (England) | Southend-on-Sea | 27 November 1918 (aged 30) | 95 | 21 | (England) Brighton & Hove Albion | 21 September 1946 | Free transfer |
| Vic Keeble | CF | (England) | Colchester | 25 June 1930 (aged 18) | 30 | 17 | (England) King George Youth Club | 23 May 1947 | £10 |
| Denis Maffey | CF | (England) | Sunderland | 22 February 1922 (aged 27) | 31 | 1 | (England) Ipswich Town | May 1948 | Free transfer |
| Bob Neville | OL | (England) | Colchester | 4 October 1925 (aged 23) | 7 | 2 | (England) Rowhedge | October 1946 | Free transfer |
| Arthur Turner | CF | (England) | Poplar | 22 January 1921 (aged 28) | 111 | 83 | (England) Charlton Athletic | September 1946 | Free transfer |

== Transfers ==
=== In ===
| Date | Position | Nationality | Name | From | Fee | Ref. |
|---|---|---|---|---|---|---|
| July 1949 | WG | (Spain) | José Gallego | (England) Southampton | Free transfer | |
| August 1949 | WH | (England) | Bill Layton | (England) Bradford Park Avenue | £800 | |
| 20 August 1949 | CB | (England) | Reg Stewart | (England) Sheffield Wednesday | £1,000 (paid on joining Football League in 1950) | (Note: Date of signing refers to the date of the player's first game for the club) |
| 8 September 1949 | WH | (England) | John Moore | (England) Brentford | £1,000 | |
| 8 October 1949 | FB | (England) | Doug Beach | (England) Southend United | Free transfer | (Note: Date of signing refers to the date of the player's first game in his second spell for the club) |
| 20 October 1949 | CB | (England) | Ronnie Sales | (England) Leyton Orient | Free transfer | |
| 22 October 1949 | CF | | John Sharpe | (England) Southampton | Trial | |

- Total spending: ▼ ~ £2,800

=== Out ===
| Date | Position | Nationality | Name | To | Fee | Ref. |
|---|---|---|---|---|---|---|
| End of season | GK | (England) | Harry Wright | (England) Guildford City | Coach | |
| End of season | WH | (England) | Wally Nunn | (England) Guildford City | Free transfer | |
| End of season | WH/IR | (England) | Frank Stamper | (England) Hartlepools United | Undisclosed | |
| End of season | WG | (England) | Norman George | Free agent | Released | |
| End of season | IF | (Scotland) | Andy Brown | (England) Kidderminster Harriers | Free transfer | |
| End of season | IR | (England) | Ray Townrow | (England) Clacton Town | Free transfer | |
| May 1949 | WH | (England) | Alf Miller | (England) Colchester United | Coaching staff | |
| 10 September 1949 | CF | (England) | Len Cater | (England) Clacton Town | Free transfer | (Note: Date of departure refers to the date of the player's final game for the club) |
| 1 October 1949 | FB | (Wales) | Bill Bower | (England) Sudbury Town | Free transfer | |
| 20 October 1949 | CB | (England) | Ronnie Sales | (England) Hartlepools United | Free | |
| 22 October 1949 | CF | | John Sharpe | Free agent | End of trial | |

== Match details ==
=== Southern League ===
==== League table ====
| Pos | Team | Pld | W | D | L | GF | GA | GR | Pts | Results |
|---|---|---|---|---|---|---|---|---|---|---|
| 1 | Merthyr Tydfil | 46 | 34 | 3 | 9 | 143 | 62 | 2.306 | 71 | |
| 2 | Colchester United | 46 | 31 | 9 | 6 | 109 | 51 | 2.137 | 71 | Elected to the Football League Third Division South |
| 3 | Yeovil Town | 46 | 29 | 7 | 10 | 104 | 45 | 2.311 | 65 | |
| 4 | Chelmsford City | 46 | 26 | 9 | 11 | 121 | 64 | 1.891 | 61 | |
| 5 | Gillingham | 46 | 23 | 9 | 14 | 92 | 61 | 1.508 | 55 | Elected to the Football League Third Division South |

Source: rsssf.com
Rules for classification: 1) points; 2) goal ratio.

==== Matches ====
| 20 August 1949 1 | Colchester United | 3–0 | Weymouth | Colchester |
| | Layton; Curry | Report | | Stadium: Layer Road; Attendance: 9,897 |

| 27 August 1949 2 | Colchester United | 4–1 | Headington United | Colchester |
| | Own goal Curry; Keeble | Report | Unknown goalscorer | Stadium: Layer Road; Attendance: 9,203 |

| 1 September 1949 3 | Gloucester City | 2–3 | Colchester United | Gloucester |
| | Unknown goalscorer | Report | Cutting; Keeble | Stadium: Longlevens |

| 3 September 1949 4 | Bath City | 1–1 | Colchester United | Bath |
| | Unknown goalscorer | Report | Bearryman | Stadium: Twerton Park |

| 8 September 1949 5 | Chingford Town | 3–1 | Colchester United | Chingford |
| | Unknown goalscorer | Report | Curry | Stadium: Newgate Street |

| 10 September 1949 6 | Chelmsford City | 2–2 | Colchester United | Chelmsford |
| | Unknown goalscorer | Report | Allen (pen.); Keeble | Stadium: New Writtle Street |

| 14 September 1949 7 | Cheltenham Town | 1–3 | Colchester United | Cheltenham |
| | Crowe | Report | Gallego 48'; Curry 67'; Foxall 74' | Stadium: Whaddon Road |

| 17 September 1949 8 | Colchester United | 4–1 | Chelmsford City | Colchester |
| | Allen (pen.); Cutting; Keeble | Report | Unknown goalscorer | Stadium: Layer Road; Attendance: 14,718 |

| 22 September 1949 9 | Colchester United | 4–1 | Worcester City | Colchester |
| | Curry; Bearryman; Keeble | Report | Unknown goalscorer | Stadium: Layer Road; Attendance: 8,542 |

| 24 September 1949 10 | Colchester United | 2–1 | Gillingham | Colchester |
| | Curry; Keeble | Report | Unknown goalscorer | Stadium: Layer Road; Attendance: 10,942 |

| 29 September 1949 11 | Colchester United | 3–2 | Hereford United | Colchester |
| | Allen; Cutting; Keeble | Report | Unknown goalscorer | Stadium: Layer Road; Attendance: 6,998 |

| 1 October 1949 12 | Dartford | 2–0 | Colchester United | Dartford |
| | Unknown goalscorer | Report | | Stadium: Watling Street |

| 8 October 1949 13 | Colchester United | 5–0 | Bath City | Colchester |
| | Curry; Cutting; Foxall; Keeble | Report | | Stadium: Layer Road; Attendance: 9,003 |

| 15 October 1949 14 | Tonbridge | 0–2 | Colchester United | Tonbridge |
| | | Report | Keeble | Stadium: Angel Ground |

| 20 October 1949 15 | Lovell's Athletic | 1–2 | Colchester United | Newport |
| | Unknown goalscorer | Report | Curry; Keeble | Stadium: Rexville |

| 22 October 1949 16 | Colchester United | 2–1 | Yeovil Town | Colchester |
| | Cutting | Report | Foulds | Stadium: Layer Road; Attendance: 10,632 |

| 29 October 1949 17 | Torquay United Reserves | 3–5 | Colchester United | Torquay |
| | Unknown goalscorer | Report | Curry; Hillman; Keeble | Stadium: Plainmoor |

| 5 November 1949 18 | Colchester United | 4–0 | Lovell's Athletic | Colchester |
| | Layton (pen.); Curry; Keeble | Report | | Stadium: Layer Road; Attendance: 6,231 |

| 19 November 1949 19 | Colchester United | 8–0 | Kidderminster Harriers | Colchester |
| | Curry; Cutting; Bearryman; Foxall; Keeble | Report | | Stadium: Layer Road; Attendance: 7,320 |

| 26 November 1949 20 | Exeter City Reserves | 2–3 | Colchester United | Exeter |
| | Unknown goalscorer | Report | Curry; Keeble | Stadium: St James Park |

| 3 December 1949 21 | Weymouth | 0–0 | Colchester United | Weymouth |
| | | Report | | Stadium: Recreation Ground |

| 10 December 1949 22 | Colchester United | 1–0 | Hastings United | Colchester |
| | Layton | Report | | Stadium: Layer Road; Attendance: 6,536 |

| 24 December 1949 23 | Bedford Town | 2–4 | Colchester United | Bedford |
| | Unknown goalscorer | Report | Curry; Cutting; Keeble | Stadium: The Eyrie |

| 26 December 1949 24 | Colchester United | 1–0 | Bedford Town | Colchester |
| | Cutting | Report | | Stadium: Layer Road; Attendance: 9,083 |

| 27 December 1949 25 | Hastings United | 0–5 | Colchester United | Hastings |
| | | Report | Cutting; Foxall; Keeble | Stadium: The Pilot Field |

| 31 December 1949 26 | Colchester United | 3–0 | Merthyr Tydfil | Colchester |
| | Cutting; Keeble | Report | | Stadium: Layer Road; Attendance: 9,957 |

| 7 January 1950 27 | Colchester United | 6–1 | Gloucester City | Colchester |
| | Cutting 33'; Foxall 43'; Lawson 60' (o.g.); Keeble 67', 70'; Layton 72' | Report | Unknown goalscorer | Stadium: Layer Road; Attendance: 8,329 |

| 14 January 1950 28 | Colchester United | 2–0 | Barry Town | Colchester |
| | Layton; Keeble | Report | | Stadium: Layer Road; Attendance: 9,131 |

| 28 January 1950 29 | Gravesend & Northfleet | 2–1 | Colchester United | Northfleet |
| | Unknown goalscorer | Report | Keeble | Stadium: Stonebridge Road |

| 4 February 1950 30 | Headington United | 2–3 | Colchester United | Oxford |
| | Unknown goalscorer | Report | Curry; Cutting; Keeble | Stadium: Manor Ground |

| 11 February 1950 31 | Colchester United | 3–0 | Chingford Town | Colchester |
| | Curry; Cutting | Report | | Stadium: Layer Road; Attendance: 7,797 |

| 4 March 1950 32 | Hereford United | 0–1 | Colchester United | Hereford |
| | | Report | Curry | Stadium: Edgar Street |

| 18 March 1950 33 | Worcester City | 1–3 | Colchester United | Worcester |
| | Unknown goalscorer | Report | Layton (pen.); Hillman; Keeble | Stadium: St George's Lane |

| 23 March 1950 34 | Colchester United | 2–2 | Cheltenham Town | Colchester |
| | Hillman; Cutting | Report | Unknown goalscorer | Stadium: Layer Road; Attendance: 5,352 |

| 25 March 1950 35 | Kidderminster Harriers | 1–1 | Colchester United | Kidderminster |
| | McGowan | Report | Keeble | Stadium: Aggborough |

| 1 April 1950 36 | Yeovil Town | 1–0 | Colchester United | Yeovil |
| | Mansley | Report | | Stadium: Huish Athletic Ground |

| 7 April 1950 37 | Colchester United | 2–1 | Guildford City | Colchester |
| | Cutting | Report | Unknown goalscorer | Stadium: Layer Road; Attendance: 10,841 |

| 8 April 1950 38 | Colchester United | 1–0 | Dartford | Colchester |
| | Keeble | Report | | Stadium: Layer Road; Attendance: 8,443 |

| 10 April 1950 39 | Guildford City | 1–1 | Colchester United | Guildford |
| | Unknown goalscorer | Report | Keeble | Stadium: St Joseph's Road |

| 13 April 1950 40 | Colchester United | 2–0 | Tonbridge | Colchester |
| | Layton; Keeble | Report | | Stadium: Layer Road; Attendance: 6,003 |

| 15 April 1950 41 | Colchester United | 0–0 | Torquay United Reserves | Colchester |
| | | Report | | Stadium: Layer Road; Attendance: 7,617 |

| 20 April 1950 42 | Colchester United | 2–2 | Gravesend & Northfleet | Colchester |
| | Cutting; Keeble | Report | Unknown goalscorer | Stadium: Layer Road; Attendance: 7,549 |

| 22 April 1950 43 | Colchester United | 3–0 | Exeter City Reserves | Colchester |
| | Own goal Hillman; Keeble | Report | | Stadium: Layer Road; Attendance: 8,111 |

| 26 April 1950 44 | Merthyr Tydfil | 5–0 | Colchester United | Merthyr Tydfil |
| | Unknown goalscorer | Report | | Stadium: Penydarren Park |

| 29 April 1950 45 | Gillingham | 6–1 | Colchester United | Gillingham |
| | Unknown goalscorer | Report | Keeble | Stadium: Priestfield Stadium |

| 6 May 1950 46 | Barry Town | 0–0 | Colchester United | Barry |
| | | Report | | Stadium: Jenner Park Stadium |

=== Southern League Cup ===
| 12 October 1949 2nd round | Gillingham | 0–1 | Colchester United | Gillingham |
| | | Report | Curry | Stadium: Priestfield Stadium; Attendance: 6,639 |

| 21 January 1950 3rd round | Chelmsford City | 1–2 | Colchester United | Chelmsford |
| | Unknown goalscorer | Report | Cutting; Bearryman | Stadium: New Writtle Street |

| 11 March 1950 Semi-final | Colchester United | 3–2 | Tonbridge | Colchester |
| | Curry; Keeble | Report | Unknown goalscorer | Stadium: Layer Road; Attendance: 10,130 |

| 27 April 1950 Final 1st leg | Bath City | 0–3 | Colchester United | Bath |
| | | Report | Hillman; Cutting | Stadium: Twerton Park |

| 3 May 1950 Final 2nd leg | Colchester United | 3–4 (a.e.t.) (6–4 agg.) | Bath City | Colchester |
| | Hillman; Keeble | Report | Hawkins; Kelly; Mills; Snook | Stadium: Layer Road; Attendance: 7,600 |

=== FA Cup ===
| 12 November 1949 4th qualifying round | Wealdstone | 1–0 | Colchester United | Ruislip |
| | Saunders 28' | Report | | Stadium: Lower Mead; Attendance: 9,549 |

== Squad statistics ==
=== Appearances and goals ===
| No. | Pos | Nat | Player | Total | | Southern League | | Southern League Cup | | FA Cup | |
| No. | Pos | Nat | Player | Apps | Goals | Apps | Goals | Apps | Goals | Apps | Goals |
|---|---|---|---|---|---|---|---|---|---|---|---|
| | GK | (England) ENG | George Wright | 52 | 0 | 46 | 0 | 5 | 0 | 1 | 0 |
| | DF | (England) ENG | Doug Beach | 35 | 0 | 30 | 0 | 4 | 0 | 1 | 0 |
| | DF | (England) ENG | Digger Kettle | 44 | 0 | 39 | 0 | 4 | 0 | 1 | 0 |
| | DF | (England) ENG | Reg Stewart | 51 | 0 | 45 | 0 | 5 | 0 | 1 | 0 |
| | MF | (England) ENG | Harry Bearryman | 52 | 4 | 46 | 3 | 5 | 1 | 1 | 0 |
| | MF | (England) ENG | Bill Layton | 43 | 7 | 37 | 7 | 5 | 0 | 1 | 0 |
| | MF | (England) ENG | John Moore | 13 | 0 | 13 | 0 | 0 | 0 | 0 | 0 |
| | FW | (England) ENG | Bob Allen | 17 | 3 | 16 | 3 | 1 | 0 | 0 | 0 |
| | FW | (England) ENG | Bob Curry | 42 | 22 | 37 | 20 | 4 | 2 | 1 | 0 |
| | FW | (England) ENG | Fred Cutting | 52 | 24 | 46 | 21 | 5 | 3 | 1 | 0 |
| | FW | (England) ENG | Stan Foxall | 51 | 5 | 45 | 5 | 5 | 0 | 1 | 0 |
| | FW | (Spain) ESP | José Gallego | 8 | 1 | 8 | 1 | 0 | 0 | 0 | 0 |
| | FW | (England) ENG | Dennis Hillman | 41 | 6 | 35 | 4 | 5 | 2 | 1 | 0 |
| | FW | (England) ENG | Vic Keeble | 51 | 46 | 45 | 42 | 5 | 4 | 1 | 0 |
| | FW | (England) ENG | Denis Maffey | 6 | 0 | 5 | 0 | 1 | 0 | 0 | 0 |
| | FW | (England) ENG | Arthur Turner | 6 | 0 | 5 | 0 | 1 | 0 | 0 | 0 |
Players who appeared for Colchester who left during the season
| | DF | (Wales) WAL | Bill Bower | 2 | 0 | 2 | 0 | 0 | 0 | 0 | 0 |
| | DF | (England) ENG | Ronnie Sales | 1 | 0 | 1 | 0 | 0 | 0 | 0 | 0 |
| | FW | (England) ENG | Len Cater | 4 | 0 | 4 | 0 | 0 | 0 | 0 | 0 |
| | FW | | John Sharpe | 1 | 0 | 1 | 0 | 0 | 0 | 0 | 0 |

=== Goalscorers ===
| Place | Nationality | Position | Name | Southern League | Southern League Cup | FA Cup | Total |
|---|---|---|---|---|---|---|---|
| 1 | (England) | CF | Vic Keeble | 42 | 4 | 0 | 46 |
| 2 | (England) | IF | Fred Cutting | 21 | 3 | 0 | 24 |
| 3 | (England) | IF | Bob Curry | 20 | 2 | 0 | 22 |
| 4 | (England) | WH | Bill Layton | 7 | 0 | 0 | 7 |
| 5 | (England) | WG | Dennis Hillman | 4 | 2 | 0 | 6 |
| 6 | (England) | WG | Stan Foxall | 5 | 0 | 0 | 5 |
| 7 | (England) | WH | Harry Bearryman | 3 | 1 | 0 | 4 |
| 8 | (England) | WG | Bob Allen | 3 | 0 | 0 | 3 |
| 9 | (Spain) | WG | José Gallego | 1 | 0 | 0 | 1 |
| | | | Own goals | 3 | 0 | 0 | 3 |
| | | | TOTALS | 109 | 12 | 0 | 121 |

=== Clean sheets ===
Number of games goalkeepers kept a clean sheet.

| Place | Nationality | Player | Southern League | Southern League Cup | FA Cup | Total |
|---|---|---|---|---|---|---|
| 1 | (England) | George Wright | 18 | 2 | 0 | 20 |
| | | TOTALS | 18 | 2 | 0 | 20 |

=== Player debuts ===
Players making their first-team Colchester United debut in a fully competitive match.

| Position | Nationality | Player | Date | Opponent | Ground | Notes |
|---|---|---|---|---|---|---|
| WH | (England) | Bill Layton | 20 August 1949 | Weymouth | Layer Road | |
| CB | (England) | Reg Stewart | 20 August 1949 | Weymouth | Layer Road | |
| WG | (Spain) | José Gallego | 20 August 1949 | Weymouth | Layer Road | |
| WH | (England) | John Moore | 8 September 1949 | Chingford Town | Newgate Street | |
| FB | (England) | Doug Beach | 8 October 1949 | Chelmsford City | Layer Road | (Note: Second debut for the club) |
| CB | (England) | Ronnie Sales | 20 October 1949 | Lovell's Athletic | Rexville | |
| CF | | John Sharpe | 22 October 1949 | Yeovil Town | Layer Road | |

== See also ==
- List of Colchester United F.C. seasons
