= 1948–49 Colchester United F.C. season =

Colchester United
1948–49 season
- Chairman: Bill Allen
- Manager: Jimmy Allen (from July 1948)
- Stadium: Layer Road
- Southern League: 4th
- FA Cup: 1st round (eliminated by Reading)
- Southern League Cup: Runners-up
- Top goalscorer: League: Arthur Turner (28); All: Arthur Turner (31)
- Highest home attendance: 19,072 v Reading, 27 November 1948
- Lowest home attendance: 4,131 v Bedford Town, 21 October 1948
- Average home league attendance: 8,476
- Biggest win: 6–0 v Bedford Town, 21 October 1948
- Biggest defeat: 0–5 v Merthyr Tydfil, 22 April 1949; 1–6 v Gloucester City, 30 April 1949
Home colours

The 1948–49 season was Colchester United's seventh season in their history and their seventh in the Southern League. Alongside competing in the Southern League, the club also participated in the FA Cup and Southern League Cup. The club finished as runners–up in the Southern League Cup to Yeovil Town just ten days after losing the delayed 1947–48 season final to Merthyr Tydfil. The club exited the FA Cup in the first round to Reading, although the first encounter between the clubs was abandoned due to heavy fog. The match gathered a record Layer Road and Colchester United crowd of 19,072, before being abandoned with the scores at 1–1.

== Season overview ==
Former Aston Villa and Portsmouth defender Jimmy Allen was tasked with taking Colchester United into the Football League when he stepped into the void left following Ted Fenton's departure for West Ham United during the simmer.

The ex-England international oversaw his side reach the final of the Southern League Cup for the second successive season. With the 1947–48 final held over from the previous season, Colchester first lost that final against Merthyr Tydfil 5–0, before losing the 1948–49 season final 3–0 to Yeovil Town ten days later. During these ten days, the club also played four league fixtures.

On the back of a successful FA Cup run across the 1947–48 season, much was expected of Colchester for their 1948–49 campaign. They drew Reading at home for their first–round fixture, but the game which drew a record Layer Road and Colchester United crowd of 19,072 was abandoned with the scores tied at 1–1 due to heavy fog. The rearranged match saw the U's crash out with a 4–2 defeat.

In the Southern League, Colchester once again finished in fourth position while Chelmsford City and Gillingham battled for the title, with the Kent side winning their second title in three years.

== Players ==
As of match played 7 May 1949.

Name	Position	Nationality	Place of birth	Date of birth	Apps	Goals	Signed from	Date signed	Fee
Goalkeepers
Ken Whitehead	GK	(England)			0	0	(England) Clacton Town	May 1948	Free transfer
George Wright	GK	(England)	Plymouth	10 October 1919 (aged 28)	0	0	(England) Plymouth Argyle	May 1949	£1,000
Harry Wright	GK	(England)	Tottenham	3 June 1909 (aged 38)	64	0	(England) Chelmsford City	11 July 1946	Free transfer
Defenders
Bill Bower	FB	(Wales)	Wrexham	17 November 1911 (aged 36)	73	1	(England) Millwall	28 November 1945	Free transfer
George French	FB	(England)	Colchester	10 November 1926 (aged 21)	0	0	(England) West Ham United	February 1949	Free transfer
Digger Kettle	FB	(England)	Colchester	3 June 1922 (aged 25)	60	1	(England) Arclight Sports	September 1946	Free transfer
Midfielders
Harry Bearryman	WH	(England)	Wandsworth	26 September 1924 (aged 23)	46	5	(England) Chelsea	4 July 1947	Free transfer
Alf Miller	WH	(England)	Portsmouth	25 March 1917 (aged 31)	0	0	(England) Plymouth Argyle	August 1948	Free transfer
Wally Nunn	WH	(England)	Deptford	16 January 1920 (aged 28)	0	0	(England) Swindon Town	June 1948	Free transfer
Frank Stamper	WH/IR	(England)	Hartlepool	22 February 1926 (aged 22)	8	0	Colchester Garrison Army Fire Fighting Centre	3 March 1947	Free transfer
Forwards
Bob Allen	WG	(England)	Bromley-by-Bow	11 October 1916 (aged 31)	44	0	(England) Gainsborough Trinity	13 June 1946	Free transfer
Andy Brown	IF	(Scotland)	Coatbridge	20 February 1915 (aged 33)	42	3	(England) Torquay United	17 June 1947	Free transfer
Len Cater	CF	(England)	Colchester		76	26	Free agent	6 June 1946	Free transfer
Bob Curry	IF	(England)	Gateshead	2 November 1918 (aged 29)	83	49	(England) Northampton Town	13 June 1947	Free transfer
Fred Cutting	IF	(England)	North Walsham	4 December 1921 (aged 26)	31	15	(England) Norwich City	6 December 1947 (Note: Date of signing refers to the date of the player's first game for the club)	Free transfer
Stan Foxall	WG	(England)	Crowle	8 September 1914 (aged 33)	0	0	(England) West Ham United	June 1948	Free transfer
Norman George	WG	(England)			0	0		4 September 1948	Free transfer
Dennis Hillman	WG	(England)	Southend-on-Sea	27 November 1918 (aged 29)	72	13	(England) Brighton & Hove Albion	21 September 1946	Free transfer
Vic Keeble	CF	(England)	Colchester	25 June 1930 (aged 17)	15	9	(England) King George Youth Club	23 May 1947	£10
Denis Maffey	CF	(England)	Sunderland	22 February 1922 (aged 26)	0	0	(England) Ipswich Town	May 1948	Free transfer
Bob Neville	OL				7	2	(England) Rowhedge	October 1946	Free transfer
Ray Townrow	IR	(England)	West Ham		11	5	(England) Wolverhampton Wanderers	2 January 1948	Free transfer
Arthur Turner	CF	(England)	Poplar	22 January 1921 (aged 27)	75	51	(England) Charlton Athletic	September 1946	Free transfer

== Transfers ==
=== In ===
Date	Position	Nationality	Name	From	Fee	Ref.
May 1948	GK	(England)	Ken Whitehead	(England) Clacton Town	Free transfer	
May 1948	CF	(England)	Denis Maffey	(England) Ipswich Town	Free transfer	
June 1948	WH	(England)	Wally Nunn	(England) Swindon Town	Free transfer	
June 1948	WG	(England)	Stan Foxall	(England) West Ham United	Free transfer	
August 1948	WH	(England)	Alf Miller	(England) Plymouth Argyle	Free transfer	
21 August 1948	WG	(England)	Harry Cranfield	(England) Bristol Rovers	Free transfer	(Note: Date of signing refers to the date of the player's first game for the club)
4 September 1948	WG	(England)	Norman George	Unknown	Free transfer	
February 1949	FB	(England)	George French	(England) West Ham United	Free transfer	
23 April 1949	GK	(Wales)	Graham Davies	(England) Watford	Trial	
May 1949	GK	(England)	George Wright	(England) Plymouth Argyle	£1,000	
5 May 1949	CH	(England)	Peter Hildyard	(England) Leyton Orient	Trial	

- Total spending: ▼ ~ £1,000

=== Out ===
Date	Position	Nationality	Name	To	Fee	Ref.
End of season	FB	(England)	Albert Walker	Free agent	Retired	
Summer 1948	CB	(England)	Albert Page	(England) Chingford Town	Free transfer	
Summer 1948	IF	(England)	Ian Gillespie	(England) Leiston	Player-manager	
1 May 1948	GK	(England)	Ernest Setchell	Free agent	Released	(Note: Date of departure refers to the date of the player's final game for the club)
July 1948	WH	(England)	Ted Fenton	(England) West Ham United	Assistant manager	
November 1948	FB	(Wales)	Aubrey Darmody	(England) Great Yarmouth Town	Free transfer	
November 1948	WH	(England)	Arthur Biggs	(England) Vauxhall Motors	Free transfer	
January 1949	GK	(England)	John Le Mare	(England) West Ham United	Free transfer	
2 April 1949	WG	(England)	Harry Cranfield	(England) King's Lynn	Free transfer	
2 May 1949	GK	(Wales)	Graham Davies	(England) Watford	End of trial	
5 May 1949	CH	(England)	Peter Hildyard	(England) Leyton Orient	End of trial	

== Match details ==
=== Southern League ===
==== League table ====
Pos	Team	Pld	W	D	L	GF	GA	GR	Pts
2	Chelmsford City	42	27	7	8	115	64	1.797	61
3	Merthyr Tydfil	42	26	8	8	133	54	2.463	60
4	Colchester United	42	21	10	11	94	61	1.541	52
5	Worcester City	42	22	7	13	87	56	1.554	51
6	Dartford	42	21	9	12	73	53	1.377	51

Source: rsssf.com
Rules for classification: 1) points; 2) goal ratio.

==== Matches ====
21 August 1948 1	Cheltenham Town	1–1	Colchester United	Cheltenham
	Unknown goalscorer	Report	Cutting	Stadium: Whaddon Road; Attendance: 3,400

28 August 1948 2	Colchester United	2–2	Bedford Town	Colchester
	Curry 32'; Foxall 75'	Report	Ball 45'; Parsons 46'	Stadium: Layer Road; Attendance: 8,945

1 September 1948 3	Chelmsford City	2–1	Colchester United	Chelmsford
	O'Neill 47'; Murphy 82'	Report	Turner 19' (pen.)	Stadium: New Writtle Street; Attendance: 12,550

4 September 1948 4	Barry Town	3–1	Colchester United	Barry
	Cain; Johnston; Tobin	Report	Turner	Stadium: Jenner Park Stadium

11 September 1948 5	Colchester United	4–0	Kidderminster Harriers	Colchester
	Turner; Allen; Foxall	Report		Stadium: Layer Road; Attendance: 8,271

18 September 1948 6	Bath City	1–3	Colchester United	Bath
	Browne 80'	Report	Turner 60'; Curry	Stadium: Twerton Park

23 September 1948 7	Lovell's Athletic	1–1	Colchester United	Newport
	Unknown goalscorer	Report	Curry	Stadium: Rexville

25 September 1948 8	Colchester United	3–2	Chelmsford City	Colchester
	Keeble 8', 12'; Cutting 42'	Report	Foreman 76'; Plunkett 77'	Stadium: Layer Road; Attendance: 14,048

16 October 1948 9	Chingford Town	1–5	Colchester United	Chingford
	Wade	Report	Foxall 41'; Turner; Curry; Cutting	Stadium: Newgate Street

6 November 1948 10	Torquay United Reserves	1–3	Colchester United	Torquay
	Griffiths 35'	Report	Cutting 10'; Turner 15', 40'	Stadium: Plainmoor

13 November 1948 11	Colchester United	3–2	Torquay United Reserves	Colchester
	Foxall 2'; Cutting 44'; Turner 79' (pen.)	Report	Reynolds 33'; Lancaster 47'	Stadium: Layer Road; Attendance: 8,775

20 November 1948 12	Yeovil Town	0–1	Colchester United	Yeovil
		Report	Cutting 80'	Stadium: Huish Athletic Ground

18 December 1948 13	Hereford United	2–3	Colchester United	Hereford
	Hogben 48'; Sinclair 58'	Report	Evans 20' (o.g.); Curry 59', 74'	Stadium: Edgar Street

25 December 1948 14	Colchester United	1–1	Gloucester City	Colchester
	Turner	Report	Bazeley 60'	Stadium: Layer Road; Attendance: 7,706

27 December 1948 15	Colchester United	5–1	Hastings United	Colchester
	Cater 32'; Turner 40'; Hillman 45'; Cutting 46', 48'	Report	Moore 31'	Stadium: Layer Road; Attendance: 7,736

1 January 1949 16	Gillingham	1–1	Colchester United	Gillingham
	Unknown goalscorer	Report	Turner (pen.)	Stadium: Priestfield Stadium

8 January 1949 17	Hastings United	2–0	Colchester United	Hastings
	Unknown goalscorer	Report		Stadium: The Pilot Field

15 January 1949 18	Dartford	5–1	Colchester United	Dartford
	Unknown goalscorer	Report	Cutting	Stadium: Watling Street

22 January 1949 19	Colchester United	2–2	Cheltenham Town	Colchester
	Curry; Foxall	Report	Unknown goalscorer	Stadium: Layer Road; Attendance: 7,722

29 January 1949 20	Bedford Town	0–2	Colchester United	Bedford
		Report	Turner (pen.)	Stadium: The Eyrie; Attendance: 2,400

5 February 1949 21	Colchester United	3–0	Barry Town	Colchester
	Turner; Curry; Hillman	Report		Stadium: Layer Road; Attendance: 7,522

12 February 1949 22	Kidderminster Harriers	1–3	Colchester United	Kidderminster
	Jones	Report	Own goal Turner; Cater	Stadium: Aggborough; Attendance: 3,243

19 February 1949 23	Colchester United	4–0	Bath City	Colchester
	Curry; Hillman; Foxall	Report		Stadium: Layer Road; Attendance: 8,264

26 February 1949 24	Colchester United	5–2	Merthyr Tydfil	Colchester
	Turner (pen.); Curry	Report	Unknown goalscorer	Stadium: Layer Road; Attendance: 9,328

5 March 1949 25	Colchester United	4–0	Chingford Town	Colchester
	Turner; Hillman; Cutting	Report		Stadium: Layer Road; Attendance: 7,990

10 March 1949 26	Colchester United	4–0	Tonbridge	Colchester
	Turner (pen.); Cater	Report		Stadium: Layer Road; Attendance: 4,525

12 March 1949 27	Colchester United	4–2	Exeter City Reserves	Colchester
	Curry; Keeble; Unknown goalscorer	Report	Unknown goalscorer	Stadium: Layer Road; Attendance: 8,066

16 March 1949 28	Exeter City Reserves	1–1	Colchester United	Exeter
	Unknown goalscorer	Report	Hillman	Stadium: St James Park; Attendance: 2,314

19 March 1949 29	Gravesend & Northfleet	0–2	Colchester United	Northfleet
		Report	Curry; Cutting	Stadium: Stonebridge Road

24 March 1949 30	Colchester United	1–2	Dartford	Colchester
	Turner	Report	Unknown goalscorer	Stadium: Layer Road; Attendance: 7,156

26 March 1949 31	Colchester United	1–1	Yeovil Town	Colchester
	Foxall	Report	Unknown goalscorer	Stadium: Layer Road; Attendance: 10,247

2 April 1949 32	Colchester United	4–2	Lovell's Athletic	Colchester
	Own goal Turner; Curry; Cutting	Report	Unknown goalscorer	Stadium: Layer Road

11 April 1949 33	Colchester United	0–0	Gravesend & Northfleet	Colchester
		Report		Stadium: Layer Road

15 April 1949 34	Colchester United	0–1	Guildford City	Colchester
		Report	Unknown goalscorer	Stadium: Layer Road; Attendance: 10,799

16 April 1949 35	Tonbridge	3–3	Colchester United	Tonbridge
	Anderson; Hobbis; Robson	Report	Turner; Curry; George	Stadium: Angel Ground

18 April 1949 36	Guildford City	1–0	Colchester United	Guildford
15:15	Unknown goalscorer	Report		Stadium: St Joseph's Road

21 April 1949 37	Worcester City	4–2	Colchester United	Worcester
	Mogford; Summer	Report	Curry; Cater	Stadium: St George's Lane

23 April 1949 38	Merthyr Tydfil	2–0	Colchester United	Merthyr Tydfil
	Beech; Powell	Report		Stadium: Penydarren Park; Attendance: 6,500

28 April 1949 39	Colchester United	3–0	Worcester City	Colchester
	Maffey 30'; Keeble 75', 89'	Report		Stadium: Layer Road; Attendance: 5,445

30 April 1949 40	Gloucester City	6–1	Colchester United	Gloucester
	Unknown goalscorer	Report	Allen (pen.)	Stadium: Longlevens

5 May 1949 41	Colchester United	4–0	Hereford United	Colchester
	Curry; Hillman; Cater; Keeble	Report		Stadium: Layer Road

7 May 1949 42	Colchester United	2–3	Gillingham	Colchester
	Allen; Keeble	Report	Unknown goalscorer	Stadium: Layer Road; Attendance: 9,340

=== Southern League Cup ===
==== 1947–48 season fixture ====
22 April 1949 Final	Merthyr Tydfil	5–0	Colchester United	Merthyr Tydfil
	Powell 6'; Jarman 19', 30'; Davies 70'; Beech 80'	Report		Stadium: Penydarren Park; Attendance: 8,521
Note: Match held over from 1947–48 season due to fixture congestion.

==== 1948–49 season fixtures ====
26 August 1948 Preliminary round	Colchester United	3–1	Exeter City Reserves	Colchester
	Turner; Hillman; Cutting	Report	Unknown goalscorer	Stadium: Layer Road; Attendance: 8,606

21 October 1948 1st round	Colchester United	6–0	Bedford Town	Colchester
	Foxall 30', 70'; Turner 49', 76'; Curry 57'; Cater 63'	Report		Stadium: Layer Road; Attendance: 4,131

11 December 1948 2nd round	Chelmsford City	2–3	Colchester United	Chelmsford
	Soo 34' (pen.); Dicker 85'	Report	Curry 8'; Cutting 86'	Stadium: New Writtle Street; Attendance: 11,102

6 April 1949 Semi-final	Gillingham	2–4	Colchester United	Gillingham
	Unknown goalscorer	Report	Hillman; Foxall; Unknown goalscorer	Stadium: Priestfield Stadium; Attendance: 11,042

2 May 1949 Final	Yeovil Town	3–0	Colchester United	Yeovil
	Bryant; Coffey	Report		Stadium: Huish Athletic Ground; Attendance: 8,000

=== FA Cup ===
27 November 1948 1st round	Colchester United	A–A	Reading	Colchester
14:00	Curry 14'	Report	McPhee 30'	Stadium: Layer Road; Attendance: 19,072
Note: Match abandoned after 35 minutes of play due to fog with the score at 1–1.

4 December 1948 1st round	Colchester United	2–4	Reading	Colchester
	Cater 65', 69'	Report	Edelston 17', 55'; McPhee 20'; Dix 27'	Stadium: Layer Road; Attendance: 13,371

== Squad statistics ==
=== Appearances and goals ===
No.	Pos	Nat	Player	Total		Southern League		Southern League Cup		FA Cup	
No.	Pos	Nat	Player	Apps	Goals	Apps	Goals	Apps	Goals	Apps	Goals
	GK	(England) ENG	Ken Whitehead	38	0	34	0	3	0	1	0
	GK	(England) ENG	George Wright	2	0	2	0	0	0	0	0
	GK	(England) ENG	Harry Wright	5	0	3	0	2	0	0	0
	DF	(England) ENG	Digger Kettle	46	0	39	0	6	0	1	0
	MF	(England) ENG	Harry Bearryman	48	0	41	0	6	0	1	0
	MF	(England) ENG	Alf Miller	2	0	2	0	0	0	0	0
	MF	(England) ENG	Wally Nunn	12	0	10	0	2	0	0	0
	MF	(England) ENG	Frank Stamper	43	0	37	0	5	0	1	0
	FW	(England) ENG	Bob Allen	28	3	23	3	4	0	1	0
	FW	(Scotland) SCO	Andy Brown	34	0	29	0	4	0	1	0
	FW	(England) ENG	Len Cater	36	8	31	5	4	1	1	2
	FW	(England) ENG	Bob Curry	47	19	40	17	6	2	1	0
	FW	(England) ENG	Fred Cutting	42	16	35	13	6	3	1	0
	FW	(England) ENG	Stan Foxall	35	11	30	7	4	4	1	0
	FW	(England) ENG	Norman George	5	1	5	1	0	0	0	0
	FW	(England) ENG	Dennis Hillman	23	8	20	6	3	2	0	0
	FW	(England) ENG	Vic Keeble	15	8	12	8	3	0	0	0
	FW	(England) ENG	Denis Maffey	31	1	28	1	3	0	0	0
	FW	(England) ENG	Ray Townrow	1	0	1	0	0	0	0	0
	FW	(England) ENG	Arthur Turner	36	32	31	29	4	3	1	0
Players who appeared for Colchester who left during the season
	GK	(Wales) WAL	Graham Davies	3	0	2	0	1	0	0	0
	DF	(England) ENG	Peter Hildyard	1	0	1	0	0	0	0	0
	FW	(England) ENG	Harry Cranfield	6	0	6	0	0	0	0	0

=== Goalscorers ===
Place	Nationality	Position	Name	Southern League	Southern League Cup	FA Cup	Total
1	(England)	CF	Arthur Turner	29	3	0	32
2	(England)	IF	Bob Curry	17	2	0	19
3	(England)	IF	Fred Cutting	13	3	0	16
4	(England)	WG	Stan Foxall	7	4	0	11
5	(England)	CF	Len Cater	5	1	2	8
5	(England)	WG	Dennis Hillman	6	2	0	8
5	(England)	CF	Vic Keeble	8	0	0	8
8	(England)	WG	Bob Allen	3	0	0	3
9	(England)	WG	Norman George	1	0	0	1
9	(England)	CF	Denis Maffey	1	0	0	1
			Unknown goalscorer	3	1	0	4
			Own goals	1	0	0	1
			TOTALS	94	16	2	112

=== Clean sheets ===
Number of games goalkeepers kept a clean sheet.

Place	Nationality	Player	Southern League	Southern League Cup	FA Cup	Total
1	(England)	Ken Whitehead	9	1	0	10
2	(Wales)	Graham Davies	1	0	0	1
2	(England)	George Wright	1	0	0	1
		TOTALS	11	1	0	12

=== Player debuts ===
Players making their first-team Colchester United debut in a fully competitive match.

Position	Nationality	Player	Date	Opponent	Ground	Notes
WH	(England)	Wally Nunn	21 August 1948	Cheltenham Town	Whaddon Road	
WG	(England)	Harry Cranfield	21 August 1948	Cheltenham Town	Whaddon Road	
WG	(England)	Stan Foxall	21 August 1948	Cheltenham Town	Whaddon Road	
WH	(England)	Alf Miller	1 September 1948	Chelmsford City	New Writtle Street	
GK	(England)	Ken Whitehead	4 September 1948	Barry Town	Jenner Park Stadium	
CF	(England)	Denis Maffey	11 December 1948	Chelmsford City	New Writtle Street	
WG	(England)	Norman George	15 April 1949	Guildford City	Layer Road	
GK	(Wales)	Graham Davies	28 April 1949	Worcester City	Layer Road	
GK	(England)	George Wright	5 May 1949	Hereford United	Layer Road	
CH	(England)	Peter Hildyard	5 May 1949	Hereford United	Layer Road	

== See also ==
- List of Colchester United F.C. seasons
