= 1952–53 Colchester United F.C. season =

Colchester United
1952–53 season
- Chairman: Bill Allen
- Manager: Jimmy Allen (until 2 May)
- Stadium: Layer Road
- Third Division South: 22nd
- FA Cup: 3rd round (eliminated by Rotherham United)
- Top goalscorer: League: Kevin McCurley (16); All: Kevin McCurley (19)
- Highest home attendance: 14,674 v Ipswich Town, 23 August 1952
- Lowest home attendance: 3,382 v Crystal Palace, 19 March 1953
- Average home league attendance: 8,002
- Biggest win: 6–1 v Walsall, 14 February 1953
- Biggest defeat: 0–4 v Southend United, 7 March 1953; 1–5 v Torquay United, 18 April 1953; 0–4 v Norwich City, 2 May 1953
Home colours

The 1952–53 season was Colchester United's eleventh season in their history and their third season in the Third Division South, the third tier of English football. Alongside competing in the Third Division South, the club also participated in the FA Cup. Colchester reached the third round of the FA Cup for the second season running, but were knocked out by Second Division side Rotherham United after a replay. The club struggled in the league, eventually finishing 22nd of 24 teams which would ultimately cost manager Jimmy Allen his job.

== Season overview ==
The season began with a Layer Road crowd of 14,674 witnessing a 0–0 draw with local rivals Ipswich Town, and in the early stages of the campaign, the club remained mid-table. In the FA Cup, Colchester disposed of Weymouth in the first round following a replay, and then Llanelli in the second round, before once again facing Second Division Yorkshire opposition in Rotherham United. After drawing 2–2 at Millmoor and forcing a replay, Colchester lost the Layer Road replay 2–0.

In the latter stages of the season, a poor run of just one point from six games saw United slip from 13th-position to 22nd, just one place and two points above the re-election positions. Meanwhile, forward Kevin McCurley had justified manager Jimmy Allen's £750 outlay with a return of 19 goals. However, with Allen's style of play criticised by supporters and his unwillingness to reduce the playing staff as requested by the board saw Allen tender his resignation on 2 May 1953.

== Players ==
As of match played 2 May 1953.

Name	Position	Nationality	Place of birth	Date of birth	Apps	Goals	Signed from	Date signed	Fee
Goalkeepers
Frank Coombs	GK	(England)	East Ham	24 April 1925 (aged 27)	13	0	(England) Southend United	8 March 1952 (Note: Date of signing refers to the date of the player's first game for the club)	£450
George Wright	GK	(England)	Plymouth	10 October 1919 (aged 32)	131	0	(England) Plymouth Argyle	May 1949	£1,000
John Wright	GK	(England)	Aldershot	13 August 1933 (aged 18)	0	0	(England) Colchester Casuals	23 May 1952	Free transfer
Defenders
Roy Bicknell	CB	(England)	Doncaster	19 February 1926 (aged 26)	0	0	(England) Gravesend & Northfleet	June 1952	£1,000
George French	FB	(England)	Colchester	10 November 1926 (aged 25)	0	0	(England) West Ham United	February 1949	Free transfer
John Harrison	FB	(England)	Leicester	27 September 1927 (aged 24)	77	0	(England) Aston Villa	30 September 1950	Nominal
Digger Kettle	FB	(England)	Colchester	3 June 1922 (aged 29)	168	1	(England) Arclight Sports	September 1946	Free transfer
Phil Rookes	FB	(England)	Dulverton	23 April 1919 (aged 33)	28	0	(England) Portsmouth	July 1951	£1,000
Trevor Rowlands	FB	(Wales)	Wattstown	2 February 1922 (aged 30)	41	2	(England) Norwich City	20 July 1950	£1,000
Reg Stewart	CB	(England)	Sheffield	30 October 1925 (aged 26)	146	0	(England) Sheffield Wednesday	20 August 1949	£1,000
Midfielders
Harry Bearryman	WH	(England)	Wandsworth	26 September 1924 (aged 27)	243	9	(England) Chelsea	4 July 1947	Free transfer
Jimmy Elder	WH	(Scotland)	Scone	5 March 1928 (aged 24)	93	7	(England) Portsmouth	19 August 1950	£1,000
Trevor Harris	WH	(England)	Colchester	6 February 1936 (aged 16)	0	0	Amateur	July 1951	Free transfer
Bert Hill	WH	(England)	West Ham	8 March 1930 (aged 22)	0	0	(England) Chelsea	September 1952	£300
Ron Hunt	WH	(England)	Colchester	26 September 1933 (aged 18)	3	0	Amateur	October 1951	Free transfer
Forwards
Peter Aitchison	WG	(England)	Harlow	19 September 1931 (aged 20)	9	2	Amateur	August 1950	Free transfer
Bert Barlow	IF	(England)	Kilnhurst	22 July 1916 (aged 35)	0	0	(England) Leicester City	Summer 1952	<£1,000
John Church	WG	(England)	Lowestoft	17 September 1919 (aged 32)	83	13	(England) Norwich City	19 August 1950	£1,000
Dick Cullum	FW	(England)	Colchester	28 January 1931 (aged 21)	0	0	(England) Colchester Colts	28 March 1951	Free transfer
Stan Edwards	CF	(England)	Dawdon	17 October 1926 (aged 25)	0	0	(England) Chelsea	6 September 1952	£750
Mike Grice	WG	(England)	Woking	3 November 1931 (aged 20)	0	0	(England) Lowestoft Town	Summer 1952	£25
Kevin McCurley	CF	(England)	Consett	2 April 1926 (aged 26)	11	6	(England) Liverpool	June 1951	£750
Johnny McKim	IF	(Scotland)	Greenock	22 January 1926 (aged 26)	51	18	(England) Chelsea	19 August 1950	£1,000
Augie Scott	IF	(England)	Sunderland	19 February 1921 (aged 31)	48	6	(England) Southampton	18 August 1951	£2,000
Peter Wright	WG	(England)	Colchester	26 January 1934 (aged 18)	9	0	Amateur	November 1951	Free transfer

== Transfers ==
=== In ===
Date	Position	Nationality	Name	From	Fee	Ref.
Summer 1952	IF	(England)	Bert Barlow	(England) Leicester City	<£1,000	
Summer 1952	WG	(England)	Mike Grice	(England) Lowestoft Town	£25	
23 May 1952	GK	(England)	John Wright	(England) Colchester Casuals	Free transfer	
June 1952	CB	(England)	Roy Bicknell	(England) Gravesend & Northfleet	£1,000	
September 1952	WH	(England)	Bert Hill	(England) Chelsea	£300	
6 September 1952	CF	(England)	Stan Edwards	(England) Chelsea	£750	(Note: Date of signing refers to the date of the player's first game for the club)

- Total spending: ▼ ~ £3,075

=== Out ===
Date	Position	Nationality	Name	To	Fee	Ref.
End of season	WG	(Scotland)	Adam Davidson	(Scotland) Carnoustie Panmure	Released	
End of season	CF	(England)	Arthur Turner	(England) Headington United	Free transfer	
Summer 1952	WH	(England)	John Moore	(England) Staines Town	Free transfer	
Summer 1952	FW	(England)	Jack McClelland	(England) Stoke City	Undisclosed	
14 March 1953	WH	(England)	Harry Wilkinson	(England) Folkestone Town	Released	(Note: Date of departure refers to the date of the player's final game for the club)
4 April 1953	WH	(England)	Len Jones	(England) Ipswich Town	Released	

== Match details ==
=== Third Division South ===
==== Results round by round ====
Round	1	2	3	4	5	6	7	8	9	10	11	12	13	14	15	16	17	18	19	20	21	22	23	24	25	26	27	28	29	30	31	32	33	34	35	36	37	38	39	40	41	42	43	44	45	46
Ground	H	H	A	A	H	H	A	A	H	A	A	H	A	H	A	H	A	H	H	A	A	H	A	A	H	H	A	H	A	H	A	H	H	A	H	H	A	A	H	A	A	H	H	A	A	H
Result	D	W	D	L	W	L	L	L	W	L	W	D	L	D	L	D	W	W	W	D	L	L	W	L	D	W	L	W	D	D	L	D	W	D	D	L	L	D	W	L	L	D	L	L	L	L
Position	13	5	5	13	10	14	17	17	17	17	14	18	20	19	19	19	18	17	15	15	15	18	17	17	17	15	17	16	16	15	17	17	11	12	10	14	16	16	13	16	17	17	21	21	22	22

Source: 11v11.com
A = Away; H = Home; W = Win; D = Draw; L = Loss

==== League table ====
Pos	Team	Pld	W	D	L	GF	GA	GAv	Pts	Qualification or relegation
20	Queens Park Rangers	46	12	15	19	61	82	0.744	39	
21	Gillingham	46	12	15	19	55	74	0.743	39	
22	Colchester United	46	12	14	20	59	76	0.776	38	
23	Shrewsbury Town	46	12	12	22	68	91	0.747	36	Re-elected
24	Walsall	46	7	10	29	56	118	0.475	24	Re-elected

==== Matches ====
23 August 1952 1	Colchester United	0–0	Ipswich Town	Colchester
		Report; Report		Stadium: Layer Road; Attendance: 14,674; Referee: W. Clapton

28 August 1952 2	Colchester United	2–1	Reading	Colchester
	McKim	Report	Unknown goalscorer	Stadium: Layer Road; Attendance: 9,190

30 August 1952 3	Aldershot	0–0	Colchester United	Aldershot
		Report		Stadium: Recreation Ground; Attendance: 8,278

3 September 1952 4	Reading	2–0	Colchester United	Reading
	Unknown goalscorer	Report		Stadium: Elm Park; Attendance: 13,908

6 September 1952 5	Colchester United	3–1	Swindon Town	Colchester
	Church; McKim; Edwards	Report; Report	Betteridge	Stadium: Layer Road; Attendance: 9,062

11 September 1952 6	Colchester United	0–3	Bristol Rovers	Colchester
		Report	Unknown goalscorer	Stadium: Layer Road; Attendance: 8,909

13 September 1952 7	Queens Park Rangers	1–0	Colchester United	Shepherd's Bush
	Unknown goalscorer	Report		Stadium: Loftus Road; Attendance: 13,837

15 September 1952 8	Bristol Rovers	3–1	Colchester United	Bristol
	Unknown goalscorer	Report	Elder pen.'	Stadium: Eastville Stadium; Attendance: 17,336

20 September 1952 9	Colchester United	1–0	Shrewsbury Town	Colchester
	Scott	Report		Stadium: Layer Road; Attendance: 7,779

23 September 1952 10	Bristol City	3–2	Colchester United	Bristol
	Rogers 3', 14', 28'	Report	Barlow 13'; McCurley 28'; Elder (penalty missed)	Stadium: Ashton Gate Stadium; Attendance: 12,615

27 September 1952 11	Walsall	0–3	Colchester United	Walsall
		Report	Grice 37'; Church 42'; McCurley	Stadium: Fellows Park; Attendance: 7,736

4 October 1952 12	Colchester United	1–1	Gillingham	Colchester
	Church	Report	Unknown goalscorer	Stadium: Layer Road; Attendance: 8,529

11 October 1952 13	Bournemouth & Boscombe Athletic	1–0	Colchester United	Bournemouth
	Unknown goalscorer	Report		Stadium: Dean Court; Attendance: 11,679

18 October 1952 14	Colchester United	3–3	Southend United	Colchester
	Church; McKim; McCurley	Report; Report	Marsden; Stubbs	Stadium: Layer Road; Attendance: 10,589

25 October 1952 15	Watford	2–0	Colchester United	Watford
	Bowie; Cook	Report		Stadium: Vicarage Road; Attendance: 15,166

1 November 1952 16	Colchester United	0–0	Brighton & Hove Albion	Colchester
		Report		Stadium: Layer Road; Attendance: 8,139

8 November 1952 17	Newport County	0–1	Colchester United	Newport
		Report	McKim	Stadium: Somerton Park; Attendance: 8,989

29 November 1952 18	Colchester United	4–1	Torquay United	Colchester
	Barlow; Church; McKim	Report	Unknown goalscorer	Stadium: Layer Road; Attendance: 6,846

13 December 1952 19	Colchester United	3–1	Leyton Orient	Colchester
	McKim; McCurley	Report	Unknown goalscorer	Stadium: Layer Road; Attendance: 6,622

20 December 1952 20	Ipswich Town	2–2	Colchester United	Ipswich
	Elsworthy; Jones	Report; Report	McKim; McCurley	Stadium: Portman Road; Attendance: 12,572; Referee: W. Clapton

26 December 1952 21	Norwich City	3–0	Colchester United	Norwich
	Unknown goalscorer	Report		Stadium: Carrow Road; Attendance: 19,859

3 January 1953 22	Colchester United	1–2	Aldershot	Colchester
	McCurley	Report	Unknown goalscorer	Stadium: Layer Road; Attendance: 7,438

17 January 1953 23	Swindon Town	0–1	Colchester United	Swindon
		Report; Report	McKim	Stadium: County Ground; Attendance: 8,545

21 January 1953 24	Exeter City	2–0	Colchester United	Exeter
	Unknown goalscorer	Report		Stadium: St James Park; Attendance: 3,951

24 January 1953 25	Colchester United	1–1	Queens Park Rangers	Colchester
	Rowlands	Report	Unknown goalscorer	Stadium: Layer Road; Attendance: 9,150

31 January 1953 26	Colchester United	3–1	Exeter City	Colchester
	Barlow; Elder pen.' Rowlands	Report	Unknown goalscorer	Stadium: Layer Road; Attendance: 5,643

7 February 1953 27	Shrewsbury Town	3–0	Colchester United	Shrewsbury
	Unknown goalscorer	Report		Stadium: Gay Meadow; Attendance: 7,624

14 February 1953 28	Colchester United	6–1	Walsall	Colchester
	McKim; McCurley	Report	Unknown goalscorer	Stadium: Layer Road; Attendance: 5,102

21 February 1953 29	Gillingham	1–1	Colchester United	Gillingham
	Unknown goalscorer	Report	McCurley	Stadium: Priestfield Stadium; Attendance: 11,299

28 February 1953 30	Colchester United	1–1	Bournemouth & Boscombe Athletic	Colchester
	McCurley	Report	Unknown goalscorer	Stadium: Layer Road; Attendance: 7,858

7 March 1953 31	Southend United	4–0	Colchester United	Southend-on-Sea
	Bainbridge; Grant; Thompson	Report; Report		Stadium: Southend Stadium; Attendance: 10,250

14 March 1953 32	Colchester United	1–1	Watford	Colchester
	McCurley	Report	Meadows	Stadium: Layer Road; Attendance: 6,667

19 March 1953 33	Colchester United	3–0	Crystal Palace	Colchester
	McKim; McCurley	Report		Stadium: Layer Road; Attendance: 3,382

21 March 1953 34	Brighton & Hove Albion	0–0	Colchester United	Hove
		Report		Stadium: Goldstone Ground; Attendance: 12,366

28 March 1953 35	Colchester United	3–3	Newport County	Colchester
	Elder pen.' Church; McCurley; McKim (red card)	Report	Graham; Beattie	Stadium: Layer Road; Attendance: 6,200

3 April 1953 36	Colchester United	0–1	Coventry City	Colchester
		Report; Report	Brown	Stadium: Layer Road; Attendance: 10,618

4 April 1953 37	Crystal Palace	3–1	Colchester United	Selhurst
	Unknown goalscorer	Report	Church	Stadium: Selhurst Park; Attendance: 12,099

6 April 1953 38	Coventry City	2–2	Colchester United	Coventry
	Simpson 55'; Mason 90+4'	Report	Bearryman 40'; Edwards 49'	Stadium: Highfield Road; Attendance: 11,284

11 April 1953 39	Colchester United	3–1	Bristol City	Colchester
	Barlow; Edwards	Report	Unknown goalscorer	Stadium: Layer Road; Attendance: 7,519

16 April 1953 40	Northampton Town	2–0	Colchester United	Northampton
	Unknown goalscorer	Report		Stadium: County Ground; Attendance: 7,982

18 April 1953 41	Torquay United	5–1	Colchester United	Torquay
	Unknown goalscorer	Report	Barlow	Stadium: Plainmoor; Attendance: 7,269

23 April 1953 42	Colchester United	0–0	Millwall	Colchester
		Report		Stadium: Layer Road; Attendance: 8,127

25 April 1953 43	Colchester United	1–2	Northampton Town	Colchester
	Barlow	Report	Unknown goalscorer	Stadium: Layer Road; Attendance: 8,122

27 April 1953 44	Millwall	3–1	Colchester United	New Cross
	Stobbart 5'; Anslow 50'; Short 85'	Report	P. Wright 12'	Stadium: The Den; Attendance: 7,970

30 April 1953 45	Leyton Orient	5–3	Colchester United	Leyton
	Unknown goalscorer	Report	Scott; P. Wright; Edwards	Stadium: Brisbane Road; Attendance: 2,553

2 May 1953 46	Colchester United	0–4	Norwich City	Colchester
		Report	Unknown goalscorer	Stadium: Layer Road; Attendance: 10,029

=== FA Cup ===
22 November 1952 1st round	Weymouth	1–1	Colchester United	Weymouth
	Rowell	Report	McKim	Stadium: Recreation Ground; Attendance: 8,500

27 November 1952 1st round replay	Colchester United	4–0	Weymouth	Colchester
	Targett 33' (o.g.); McKim 39'; Edwards 84', 87'	Report		Stadium: Layer Road; Attendance: 4,314

6 December 1952 2nd round	Colchester United	3–2	Llanelli	Colchester
	Barlow 13'; Church 35'; McCurley 84'	Report	Morris 30', 60'	Stadium: Layer Road; Attendance: 9,693

10 January 1953 3rd round	Rotherham United	2–2	Colchester United	Rotherham
14:15 GMT	Unknown goalscorer	Report; Programme	McCurley	Stadium: Millmoor; Attendance: 16,547

15 January 1953 3rd round replay	Colchester United	0–2	Rotherham United	Colchester
		Report	Unknown goalscorer	Stadium: Layer Road; Attendance: 8,991

== Squad statistics ==
=== Appearances and goals ===
No.	Pos	Nat	Player	Total		Third Division South		FA Cup	
No.	Pos	Nat	Player	Apps	Goals	Apps	Goals	Apps	Goals
	GK	(England) ENG	Frank Coombs	18	0	18	0	0	0
	GK	(England) ENG	George Wright	33	0	28	0	5	0
	DF	(England) ENG	Roy Bicknell	8	0	6	0	2	0
	DF	(England) ENG	George French	1	0	1	0	0	0
	DF	(England) ENG	John Harrison	51	0	46	0	5	0
	DF	(England) ENG	Phil Rookes	46	0	43	0	3	0
	DF	(Wales) WAL	Trevor Rowlands	5	2	5	2	0	0
	DF	(England) ENG	Reg Stewart	45	0	40	0	5	0
	MF	(England) ENG	Harry Bearryman	50	1	45	1	5	0
	MF	(Scotland) SCO	Jimmy Elder	50	3	45	3	5	0
	MF	(England) ENG	Bert Hill	1	0	1	0	0	0
	FW	(England) ENG	Peter Aitchison	3	0	3	0	0	0
	FW	(England) ENG	Bert Barlow	33	7	28	6	5	1
	FW	(England) ENG	John Church	39	9	34	8	5	1
	FW	(England) ENG	Stan Edwards	19	7	16	5	3	2
	FW	(England) ENG	Mike Grice	13	1	13	1	0	0
	FW	(England) ENG	Kevin McCurley	47	19	42	16	5	3
	FW	(Scotland) SCO	Johnny McKim	33	15	28	13	5	2
	FW	(England) ENG	Augie Scott	40	2	38	2	2	0
	FW	(England) ENG	Peter Wright	12	2	12	2	0	0
Players who appeared for Colchester who left during the season
	MF	(England) ENG	Len Jones	13	0	13	0	0	0
	MF	(England) ENG	Harry Wilkinson	1	0	1	0	0	0

=== Goalscorers ===
Place	Nationality	Position	Name	Third Division South	FA Cup	Total
1	(England)	CF	Kevin McCurley	16	3	19
2	(Scotland)	IF	Johnny McKim	13	2	15
3	(England)	WG	John Church	8	1	9
4	(England)	IF	Bert Barlow	6	1	7
4	(England)	CF	Stan Edwards	5	2	7
6	(Scotland)	WH	Jimmy Elder	3	0	3
7	(Wales)	FB	Trevor Rowlands	2	0	2
7	(England)	IF	Augie Scott	2	0	2
7	(England)	WG	Peter Wright	2	0	2
10	(England)	WH	Harry Bearryman	1	0	1
10	(England)	WG	Mike Grice	1	0	1
			Own goals	0	1	1
			TOTALS	60	9	69

=== Disciplinary record ===
Nationality	Position	Name	Third Division South		FA Cup		Total	
Nationality	Position	Name	Booked	Sent off (straight red)	Booked	Sent off (straight red)	Booked	Sent off (straight red)
(Scotland)	IF	Johnny McKim	0	1	0	0	0	1
		TOTALS	0	1	0	0	0	1

=== Clean sheets ===
Number of games goalkeepers kept a clean sheet.

Place	Nationality	Player	Third Division South	FA Cup	Total
1	(England)	George Wright	6	1	7
2	(England)	Frank Coombs	4	0	4
		TOTALS	10	1	11

=== Player debuts ===
Players making their first-team Colchester United debut in a fully competitive match.

Position	Nationality	Player	Date	Opponent	Ground	Notes
CF	(England)	Stan Edwards	6 September 1952	Swindon Town	Layer Road	
WG	(England)	Mike Grice	11 September 1952	Bristol Rovers	Layer Road	
IF	(England)	Bert Barlow	13 September 1952	Queens Park Rangers	Loftus Road	
CB	(England)	Roy Bicknell	4 October 1952	Gillingham	Layer Road	
FB	(England)	George French	4 October 1952	Gillingham	Layer Road	
WH	(England)	Harry Wilkinson	14 March 1953	Watford	Layer Road	
WH	(England)	Bert Hill	11 April 1953	Bristol City	Layer Road	

== See also ==
- List of Colchester United F.C. seasons
