= Evacuation of children in the Spanish Civil War =

Children from the Spanish Republic evacuated to safer countries during the war

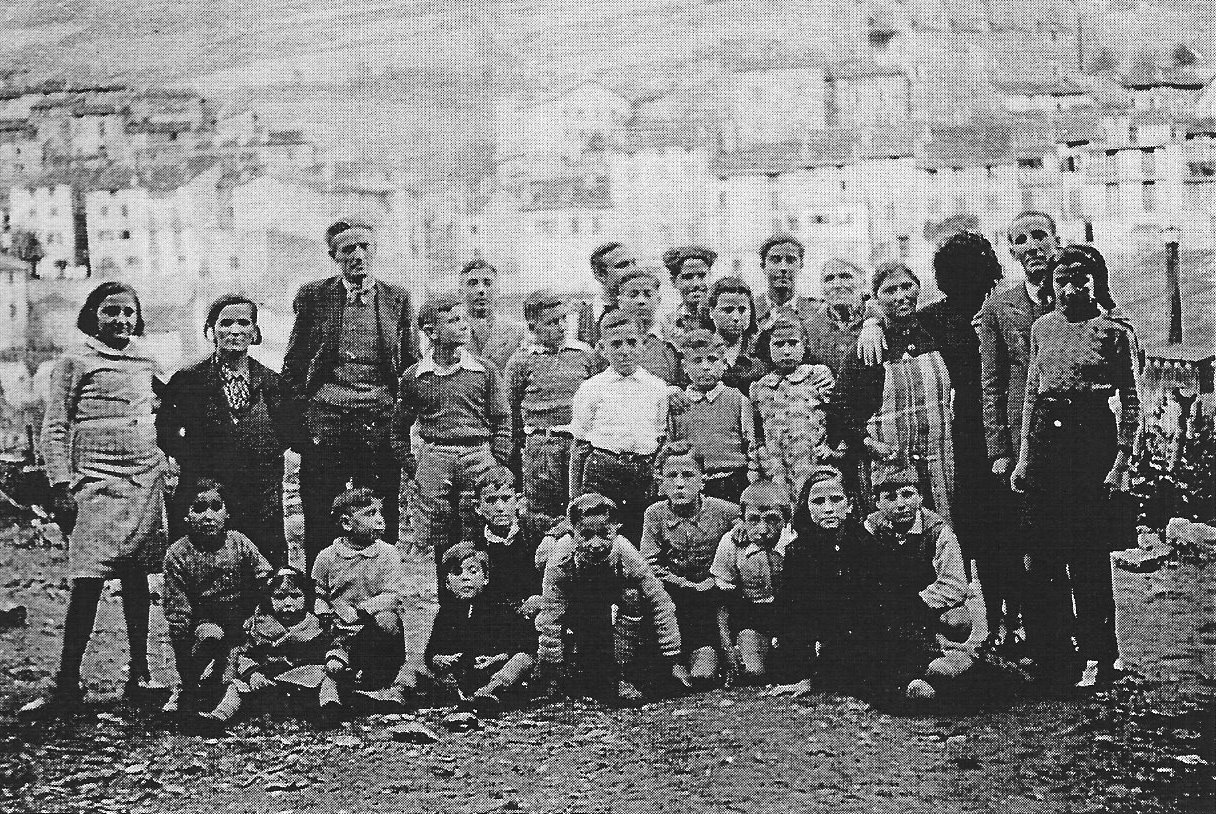
Residents of the War Resisters' International (WRI) children's refuge in the French Pyrenees, some time between 1937 and 1939, warden José Brocca standing third from left.

As the Spanish Civil War proceeded on the Northern front (from 1937 onwards), the Spanish Republican authorities arranged the evacuation of children, some of whom had insufficient documentation to enable their repatriation.

== Evacuations ==
These Spanish War children were shipped to Britain, Belgium, the Soviet Union, other European countries and Mexico. These children were referred to as "Basque refugees", but also included non-Basques. They were embarked in Bilbao (Santurtzi) on boats chartered by the Basque government, loyal to the Republic. Those in Western European countries were able to return to their families after the war, but those in the Soviet Union, from Communist families, were forbidden to return – by Stalin and by Franco. The first opportunity for most of them to do so came in 1956, three years after Stalin's death. Thus they experienced the War and its effects on the Soviet Union at first hand.

=== Stoneham Camp in England ===
Just under 4,000 children arrived at the Southampton Docks on 23 May 1937. They travelled to Britain on the steamship liner Habana, escorted by the battleship HMS Royal Oak and destroyer HMS Forester. Habana had been equipped to accommodate 800 passengers, but this voyage consisted of 3,886 children, 96 teachers, 118 assistants and 16 Catholic priests. All the children and accompanying adults were housed in a single, large refugee camp in North Stoneham, Eastleigh, near Southampton. The construction of the camp at North Stoneham had been finished only two days prior to their arrival. A local farmer, Mr Brown, had provided three of his fields to be used for the Basque children's camp. Work on the camp had begun two weeks before, but the estimated numbers had then been only 2,000; the number was then increased to an expected 4,000. The camp and the sleeping tents were overcrowded. Children were loosely segregated according to their parents' political affiliation, with the children of Basque Nationalists separated from those of Socialists, Communists and Republicans. Sanitation was also a problem in the beginning as the children had been living through war and their hygienic habits had been disrupted by their turbulent lives. Even with the cramped conditions illness was not a large problem within the camp.

The children were under the overall care of the Basque Children's Committee (BCC), part of the National Joint Committee for Spanish Relief (NJCSR) a cross-party organization that co-ordinated aid to Spain. The plan was to move the refugees out of the camp and disperse them into 'colonies' throughout Britain. These 'colonies' consisted of groups of children each with an accompanying Spanish teacher and assistants. They were housed in both large and small houses that were lent, or otherwise made available; some colonies were large - a hundred or more children, and some housed only a dozen or so. By September all of the children were moved into these colonies. Several hundred were taken in by The Salvation Army; the Catholic Church took about a third of the children, the rest were cared for and supported by many organizations including churches, political and humanitarian groups, local associations, businesses and individuals and other volunteers.

As the war in Spain progressed and areas became safer, the children started to be repatriated; the first few after barely a month. The Spanish Civil War ended on 1 April 1939, to be followed rapidly by the beginning of the Second World War in September. By this time only some 400 children remained in Britain, and by 1948 only 280 remained. Throughout their stay and the subsequent repatriations, those aged 16 and above were allowed to decide whether or not they wanted to leave the country. Some had to stay because their parents had been killed or imprisoned, others stayed by choice and made their lives in Britain. A number of evacuees later achieved prominence in different fields, including the Basque ballet dancer Pirmin Treku, who arrived in Britain as a seven-year-old on the Habana and went on to become a principal with the Royal Ballet.

Some of the refugees became professional footballers, including Sabino Barinaga, Emilio Aldecoa, José Gallego and Raimundo Lezama.

== In popular media ==
Luis de Castresana was evacuated to France and Belgium. In 1966, he published the novel El otro árbol de Guernica ("The other Gernika tree") inspired by his refugee experiences. Pedro Lazaga directed a film version in 1969.
