= John Moore (footballer, born 1923) =

English footballer (1923–2012)

Personal information
- Full name: John William Michael Moore
- Date of birth: 25 September 1923
- Place of birth: Chiswick, England
- Date of death: September 2012 (aged 88)
- Place of death: Wandsworth, England
- Height: 5 ft 10 in (1.79 m)
- Position: Wing-half

Youth career
- 1938–1939: Brentford

Senior career*
Years	Team	Apps	(Gls)
1946–1948	Brentford	4	(0)
1948–1949	Gloucester City		
1949–1952	Colchester United	15	(0)
- Staines Town
- Hastings United
Total		19	(0)
- * Club domestic league appearances and goals

John William Michael Moore (25 September 1923 – September 2012) was an English footballer who played in the Football League as a wing-half for Brentford and Colchester United.

== Career ==
Born in Chiswick, London, Moore represented London and Middlesex as a schoolboy and joined First Division side Brentford as a junior after leaving school. The club wanted Moore to sign a professional contract, but the suspension of competitive football due to the outbreak of the Second World War in 1939 prevented this. During the war, Moore guested with Manchester City, Derry City and along with other serving footballers Bill Baxter, Bobby Mitchell and John Aston, won a cup final with Australian club Canterbury-Bankstown, played at the Sydney Cricket Ground. After the war, Moore received interest from First Division side Wolverhampton Wanderers, but returned to Brentford after Harry Curtis offered him a professional contract.

Moore made his Brentford debut on 10 May 1947 in a 1–0 defeat against Bolton Wanderers in the First Division, the first full season following World War II. Behind Archie Macaulay in the pecking order, Moore only made four appearances for the club and played his last game in a 3–0 defeat at Luton Town in the Second Division on 3 September 1947. He saw out his time with the Bees in the reserve team.

On leaving Brentford, Moore turned down a move to Second Division side Leeds United and signed for Gloucester City in the Southern League, where he made 52 appearances and scored 13 goals during the 1948–49 season before joining fellow Southern League club Colchester United at the end of the season for a fee of £1,000.

Moore was signed as an understudy to Harry Bearryman, and made his first-team debut on 8 September 1949 in a 3–1 away defeat at Chingford Town. He was unable to displace Bill Layton from the first team, and by January 1950, he was made captain of the reserve team. He made 13 Southern League appearances for the club, helping the team finish as runners-up in the league and gain election to the Football League. In the Football League, Moore did not make an appearance during Colchester's inaugural 1950–51 season, but made two appearances for the club in 1951–52.

Moore left Layer Road in the summer of 1952 following his final game on 5 January 1952, a 7–0 demolition by Leyton Orient at Brisbane Road. He joined Yeovil on trial in October of the same year, but after a fortnight returned to London, looking for a club closer to his home. He later played for Staines Town and Hastings United, the latter club managed by his brother-in-law Ted Ballard.

== Personal life ==
Moore attended Chiswick School, and during the Second World War, he served in the Fleet Air Arm. After he retired from football, Moore became a car salesman. In August 1997, at age 74, he was working as a chauffeur.

== Honours ==
Colchester United

- 1949–50 Southern Football League runner-up
