= Wally Nunn =

English footballer

Personal information
- Full name: Walter P. Nunn
- Date of birth: 16 January 1920
- Place of birth: Deptford, London, England
- Date of death: 1965 (aged 44–45)
- Place of death: Tonbridge, England
- Position: Wing half

Senior career*
Years	Team	Apps	(Gls)
- Bexleyheath & Welling
- Charlton Athletic
1947–1948	Swindon Town	4	(0)
1948–1949	Colchester United	10	(0)
- Guildford City
Total		14	(0)
- * Club domestic league appearances and goals

Walter P. Nunn (16 January 1920 – 1965) was an English professional footballer who played as a wing half in the Football League for Swindon Town.

Before World War II, Nunn was on the books at Bexleyheath & Welling and Charlton Athletic, although he made no first-team appearances for Charlton. He joined Swindon Town after the war, where he made his Football League debut in the 1947–48 season. After four appearances, he joined Colchester United in the Southern League, and later signed for league rivals Guildford City.

== Career ==
Born in Deptford, London, Nunn's playing career began with Bexleyheath and Welling. Immediately before the outbreak of World War II, Nunn was signed to Charlton Athletic, but he made no first-team appearances for the club.

After the war, Nunn had joined Swindon Town. He made his Football League debut during the 1947–48 season, going on the make a further three appearances across the campaign.

Ahead of the 1948–49 season, Colchester United manager Jimmy Allen brought Nunn to the Southern League club, making his debut on 21 August 1948 in a 1–1 draw at Cheltenham Town. He made ten league and two league cup appearances during the season, but refused terms to remain with Colchester for the 1949–50 season, instead opting to join league rivals Guildford City.
