= Stan Edwards (disambiguation) =

Stan Edwards may refer to:

- Stan Edwards (born 1959), American football player
- Stan Edwards (footballer, born 1942), English footballer
- Stan Edwards (footballer, born 1926) (1926–1989), English footballer
