= Noel Simpson =

Noel Simpson is the name of:

- Noel Simpson (footballer), English footballer
- Noel Simpson (general), Australian general
