= John Foreman (footballer) =

English footballer

Personal information
- Full name: John James Foreman
- Date of birth: 6 October 1913
- Place of birth: Tanfield, County Durham, England
- Date of death: 1964 (aged 50–51)
- Height: 5 ft 8 in (1.73 m)
- Position: Winger

Youth career
- Tanfield Lea Institute

Senior career*
Years	Team	Apps	(Gls)
1931–1932	West Stanley		
1932–1933	Crook Town		
1933–1934	Sunderland	2	(0)
1934–1937	West Ham United	49	(7)
1937	Bury	4	(1)
1937–1938	Swansea Town	14	(2)
1938	Workington		
1938–1939	South Shields		
1939	Hartlepools United	0	(0)
- * Club domestic league appearances and goals

John James Foreman (6 October 1913 – 1964) was an English professional footballer who played as an outside right in the Football League for Sunderland, West Ham United, Bury and Swansea Town.

Previously with Sunderland, Foreman joined Second Division club West Ham United for the 1934–35 season. He made his debut on 29 September 1934, a home win against Plymouth Argyle, and made 23 League and cup appearances in his first season, scoring 3 goals. He followed this up with 20 League appearances, and 4 goals, in his second season. After losing his place to Stan Foxall in 1936-37, he moved to Bury.

Foreman played for Workington and South Shields, before joining Hartlepools United in 1939-40. He made three appearances for Pools before the League was suspended due to the outbreak of World War II.
