= Harry Cranfield =

English footballer

Personal information
- Full name: Harold Richard Cranfield
- Date of birth: 25 December 1917
- Place of birth: Chesterton, Cambridge, England
- Date of death: December 1990 (aged 72–73)
- Place of death: King's Lynn, England
- Position: Winger

Senior career*
Years	Team	Apps	(Gls)
1936–1937	Cambridge Town	9	(4)
1937–1947	Fulham	1	(0)
1947–1948	Bristol Rovers	24	(2)
1948–1949	Colchester United	6	(0)
- King's Lynn
Total		31	(2)
- * Club domestic league appearances and goals

Harold Richard Cranfield (25 December 1917 – December 1990) was an English professional footballer who played as a winger in the Football League for Fulham and Bristol Rovers.

Cranfield signed for Fulham in 1937, but had to wait nine years for his club debut, mostly due to the outbreak of World War II. After just one appearance in 1946, he moved to Bristol Rovers where after two goals and 25 consecutive appearances, injury led him to be released at the end of the season. Picked up by Colchester United in 1948, he made six appearances for the club before moving to King's Lynn.

== Career ==
Nephew of England international Vic Watson, Cranfield, who was born in Chesterton, Cambridge played for his local club Cambridge Town, hoping to follow in his uncle's footsteps as a professional footballer. He joined Fulham in December 1937, but due to the outbreak of World War II, his was forced to wait nine years for his club and professional debut.

Cranfield was called up by the Army to the Physical Training School in Aldershot. Despite being posted overseas, Cranfield did manage to play for Fulham during the war years, scoring four goals in eleven appearances. Cranfield also made a further eight appearances for Cambridge Town during the wartime period, scoring five goals. After the resumption of league football in 1946, Cranfield made his one and only first-team appearance for Fulham. However, it was in his reserve team games where he impressed most, scoring 13 goals. In June 1937, Bristol Rovers paid Fulham approximately £3,000 for Cranfield's services.

Cranfield scored on his debut for Bristol Rovers, and would rack up 25 consecutive games for the club before injury struck and he required a cartilage operation. This effectively ended his campaign and he was released by the club at the end of the season. He joined Colchester United ahead of the 1948–49 season, making his debut on 21 August 1948 in a 1–1 draw at Cheltenham Town. He was released by Colchester at the end of the season after playing just six games. He then moved to King's Lynn.
