= Graham Davies =

Welsh footballer

Personal information
- Full name: Graham Gilding Davies
- Date of birth: 3 October 1921
- Place of birth: Swansea, Wales
- Date of death: 2003 (aged 81–82)
- Position: Goalkeeper

Youth career
- Swansea Town

Senior career*
Years	Team	Apps	(Gls)
1947–1949	Watford	9	(0)
1949	Colchester United	2	(0)
- Hereford United
- Merthyr Tydfil
Total		11	(0)
- * Club domestic league appearances and goals

Graham Gilding Davies (3 October 1921 – 2003) was a Welsh footballer who played in the Football League as a goalkeeper for Colchester United.

== Career ==
Davies, born in Swansea, played for Swansea Town as a youth but failed to make a first-team appearance for the club. He moved to Football League club Watford in 1947 where he made nine appearances. He joined Southern League side Colchester United in 1949, making two league appearances. Davies made his debut for Colchester on 28 April 1949 in a 3–0 win over Worcester City and his final appearance came just two matches later in the Southern League Cup final which resulted in a 3–0 defeat for the U's versus Yeovil Town. Davies would later play for Hereford United and returned to Wales to play for Merthyr Tydfil. He died in 2003.

== Honours ==
Colchester United

- 1948–49 Southern League Cup runner-up

All honours referenced by:
