= Bob Allen (footballer, born 1916) =

English footballer

Personal information
- Full name: Albert Robert Allen
- Date of birth: 11 October 1916
- Place of birth: Bromley-by-Bow, London, England
- Date of death: 7 February 1992 (aged 75)
- Place of death: Epping, England
- Height: 5 ft 11 in (1.80 m)
- Position: Winger

Youth career
- 1931–1932: Tottenham Hotspur

Senior career*
| Years | Team | Apps | (Gls) |
| 1932 | Tottenham Hotspur | 0 | (0) |
| 1932–1933 | Leytonstone | | |
| 1933 | Clapton Orient | 1 | (0) |
| 1934–1936 | Fulham | 11 | (0) |
| 1937 | Doncaster Rovers | 31 | (6) |
| 1938 | Brentford | 0 | (0) |
| 1938 | Dartford | | |
- → Port Vale (guest)
- → Northampton Town (guest)
| 1946 | Northampton Town | 5 | (0) |
| 1947–1951 | Colchester United | 70 | (6) |
| 1951–1952 | Bedford Town | 45 | (0) |
| Total | | 118 | (12) |

International career
- England Schoolboys
- * Club domestic league appearances and goals

Albert Robert Allen (11 October 1916 – 7 February 1992) was an English footballer who played as a winger in the Football League for Clapton Orient, Fulham, Doncaster Rovers, Northampton Town and Colchester United. The majority of his success as a player came at Colchester United, where he won the Southern League Cup and finished as runner-up in the league the same year, helping the club gain entry to the Football League.

== Career ==
Born in Bromley-by-Bow, London, two-time England Schoolboy international Allen was on the books at Tottenham Hotspur before leaving to join Leytonstone in 1932 and then rekindled his Football League career at Clapton Orient in 1933 where he made one appearance. Allen then joined another London-based club, Fulham, where he made eleven appearances in two years.

Allen moved north to play for Doncaster Rovers in 1937, joining for a fee of £350. He scored six goals in 31 games for the club during his single season before moving back to London with Brentford, where he failed to make a first-team appearance. He then played for Dartford before World War II. During the war years, Allen made guest appearances for Port Vale and then Northampton Town before joining the latter when League football recommenced following the hostilities.

In 1947, Allen joined Southern League club Colchester United, where he helped the club finish the Southern League Cup as runners-up twice before winning the competition in 1950. He also aided the club in their quest for League football with election to the Football League the same year after ending the 1949–50 season as league runners-up. After making his debut on 30 August 1947 in a 5–1 win at Bedford Town, Allen went on to make 70 appearances for Colchester in the Southern League and Football League, before a serious knee injury suffered in a 2–0 defeat to Watford at Vicarage Road on 10 February 1951 ended his professional career. He later made a brief return to the Southern League with Bedford Town in August 1951 and retired at the end of the 1951–52 season after having made 45 appearances.

== Personal life ==
As a youth, alongside appearing for England Schoolboys, Allen played tennis at Wimbledon and was a renowned London Schools sprinter but opted to pursue a football career.

After his move to Bedford Town in 1951, Allen found himself in hospital a year later with the prospect of a further year of treatment ahead of him. Colchester arranged a benefit match with Bedford in September 1952 to help aid his family's immediate financial concerns, with a gate of 4,500 in attendance. He later recovered and became a welfare officer in the Redbridge education department.

Albert Robert Allen died in Epping on 7 February 1992 at the age of 75.

== Career statistics ==
Appearances and goals by club, season and competition
| Club | Season | League | | | FA Cup | | Total | |
| Club | Season | Division | Apps | Goals | Apps | Goals | Apps | Goals |
|---|---|---|---|---|---|---|---|---|
| Tottenham Hotspur | 1932–33 | Second Division | 0 | 0 | 0 | 0 | 0 | 0 |
| Clapton Orient | 1933–34 | Third Division South | 1 | 0 | 0 | 0 | 1 | 0 |
| Fulham | 1934–35 | Second Division | 3 | 0 | 0 | 0 | 3 | 0 |
| Fulham | 1935–36 | Second Division | 7 | 0 | 0 | 0 | 7 | 0 |
| Fulham | 1936–37 | Second Division | 1 | 0 | 0 | 0 | 1 | 0 |
| Fulham | Total | | 11 | 0 | 0 | 0 | 11 | 0 |
| Doncaster Rovers | 1937–38 | Third Division North | 31 | 6 | 2 | 0 | 33 | 6 |
| Brentford | 1938–39 | First Division | 0 | 0 | 0 | 0 | 0 | 0 |
| Northampton Town | 1946–47 | Third Division South | 5 | 0 | 0 | 0 | 5 | 0 |
| Colchester United | 1950–51 | Third Division South | 29 | 1 | 2 | 0 | 31 | 1 |

== Honours ==
Colchester United

- Southern League Cup: 1949–50; runner-up 1947–48, 1948–49
- Southern League runner-up: 1949–50

All honours referenced by:
