= Emilio Aldecoa =

Spanish footballer and manager

Personal information
- Full name: Emilio Aldecoa Gómez
- Date of birth: 30 November 1922
- Place of birth: Bilbao, Spain
- Date of death: 4 September 1999 (aged 76)
- Place of death: Lloret de Mar, Spain
- Position: Inside forward

Youth career
- English Electric Co.

Senior career*
Years	Team	Apps	(Gls)
1943–1945	Wolverhampton Wanderers	0	(0)
1945–1947	Coventry City	29	(0)
1947–1949	Athletic Bilbao	45	(9)
1949–1950	Valladolid	49	(11)
1950–1953	Barcelona	23	(2)
1953–1954	Sporting de Gijón	3	(0)

International career
1948	Spain	1	(0)

Managerial career
- 1954–1955: Hércules
- 1955–1957: Gerona
- 1957–1969: CD Condal
- 1959–1960: Gerona
- 1966–1967: Valladolid
- 1967–1968: Gerona
- 1972–1973: Llodio
- 1974–1976: Gerona
- 1979–1980: Figueras
- 1982: Gerona
- * Club domestic league appearances and goals

Emilio Aldecoa Gómez (30 November 1922 – 4 September 1999) was a Spanish professional footballer who played in the English and Spanish football leagues and later managed in Spain and England. He made one appearance for the Spain national team, as a substitute in a 2–1 win against Ireland in May 1948 at the Montjuic Stadium, Barcelona.

== Career ==
=== Refugee in England ===
Aldecoa was born in the Zorroza neighbourhood of Bilbao, Biscay.

He arrived in England as a Spanish Civil War refugee in 1937. Some of the other refugees also became footballers, including Raimundo Pérez Lezama, José Gallego and Sabino Barinaga.

Aldecoa began his football career with Wolverhampton Wanderers, joining them in 1943 from a Staffordshire electrical works team. His first team debut came in September that year, a 2–1 victory away to Crewe Alexandra and he finished the season as Wolves’ leading scorer with 11 goals in 30 games.

He moved to Coventry City in August 1945 and scored on his first team debut, a 3–1 win at home to Portsmouth. The following season, as league football resumed after World War II, he played 29 times for Coventry, failing to score. During his spell he was noted for his practical skills, helping to repair the Highfield Road stadium as well as the home of the local family with whom he was living.

=== Return to Spain ===
Aldecoa returned to Spain in 1947, joining Atlético Bilbao and making his debut on 21 September 1947 in a 5–1 defeat away to Celta Vigo. Winning his sole international cap during his stint in his native region, he scored 9 times in 45 games before moving to Real Valladolid in 1949 where he scored 11 times in 49 games.

He joined Barcelona in 1951. In his first season he scored twice in 19 games as Barcelona won the Spanish Championship. He also played in the final of the Copa Latina in 1952, a 1–0 victory over OGC Nice at the Parc des Princes in Paris. Barcelona retained the title the following season, but Aldecoa played only 4 times.

=== Later years and coaching ===
He moved to Sporting de Gijón in 1953, playing just 3 times, and then to Girona FC in 1954 where he subsequently became manager. He was assistant manager of Birmingham City between 1960 and 1962, making use of his knowledge of the English language and game, and later managed CD Condal and Real Valladolid (from 1966–67).
