= Johnny McKim =

Scottish footballer (1926–2000)

Personal information
- Full name: John McKim
- Date of birth: 22 January 1926
- Place of birth: Greenock, Scotland
- Date of death: 20 June 2000 (aged 74)
- Place of death: Colchester, England
- Position: Forward

Senior career*
Years	Team	Apps	(Gls)
?–1947	Port Glasgow		
1947–1950	Chelsea	0	(0)
1950–1955	Colchester United	129	(44)
1950–?	Clacton Town		
- * Club domestic league appearances and goals

John McKim (22 January 1926 – 20 June 2000) was a Scottish footballer who played in The Football League as a forward.

== Career ==
Born in Greenock, Scotland, McKim played in the Football League for Colchester United, making 129 league appearances scoring 44 goals. He had earlier been with Chelsea, however, he made no league appearances for the club.
