= Tony McPhee (footballer) =

Scottish footballer and manager

Personal information
- Full name: Antony Magnus McPhee
- Date of birth: April 1914
- Place of birth: Edinburgh, Scotland
- Date of death: 1960 (aged 46)
- Position: Centre-forward

Youth career
- 1929–1930: Belfast Celtic

Senior career*
Years	Team	Apps	(Gls)
1930–1936	Workington		
1936–1937	Bradford Park Avenue		
1937–1938	Coventry City		
1938–1949	Reading		

Managerial career
- 1951: Walsall
- * Club domestic league appearances and goals

Antony Magnus "Tony" McPhee (April 1914 – 1960) was a Scottish footballer and football manager. He played as a forward for Belfast Celtic, Workington, Bradford Park Avenue, Coventry City, and Reading; and briefly managed Walsall.

== Biography ==
McPhee was a "tall, commanding player" who had "deft footwork and could unleash a thunderous shot". He started his career with Belfast Celtic in Northern Ireland, before switching to Workington of the North Eastern League in 1930. He joined David Steele's Second Division Bradford Park Avenue in July 1936, and his seventeen goals in thirty games won him a move to Harry Storer's Coventry City in May 1937. He hit six goals in his first three games, before losing his form. He left Highfield Road for Reading in June 1938, who then were in the Third Division South and led by Billy Butler. Scoring on his debut against Queens Park Rangers, he hit 26 goals in 1938–39.

Prolific for Reading during World War II, he scored 160 goals in 226 games between 1939 and 1946. He retired in May 1949, and spent the next two years as manager Ted Drake's assistant. He was appointed manager of Walsall in July 1951. The "Saddlers" form dipped following a good start to 1951–52, and McPhee resigned, lamenting the lack of money available for new players and citing "problems finding a house in the area". He then kept the George Hotel in Basingstoke, and died in 1960, aged just 46.
