= Ronnie Sales =

English footballer

Personal information
- Full name: Ronald Duncan Sales
- Date of birth: 19 September 1920
- Place of birth: South Shields, England
- Date of death: August 1995 (aged 74–75)
- Place of death: South Shields, England
- Position: Defender

Youth career
- Westoe Boys
- Shields Infirmary
- South Shields Boys

Senior career*
Years	Team	Apps	(Gls)
- Reyrolle's
1942–1947	Newcastle United		
1947–1949	Leyton Orient	46	(3)
1949–1950	Colchester United	1	(0)
1950–1951	Hartlepool United	3	(0)
1951–1952	South Shields		
Total		50	(3)
- * Club domestic league appearances and goals

Ronald Duncan Sales (19 September 1920 – August 1995) was an English footballer who played in the Football League as a defender for Leyton Orient and Hartlepool United.

== Career ==
Born in South Shields, Sales played for local boys clubs including Westoe Boys, Shields Infirmary and South Shields Boys before appearing for the factory team of Reyrolle's in Tyneside. He was plucked by Newcastle United in 1942 where he made 42 wartime appearances before securing a move to Football League club Leyton Orient.

Sales made 46 appearances for Orient, scoring three goals before injury cut his time with the club short, moving briefly to Southern League side Colchester United. He made just one appearance for the club, replacing regular Reg Stewart in a 2–1 win away at Lovell's Athletic on 20 October 1949. Sales made no further appearances for Colchester, finding himself back in the north-east with Hartlepool United for the 1950–51 season. He could only manage three first-team league appearances for the club due to a knee injury, later retiring from professional football. He would then go on to play for hometown club South Shields.

Ronald Sales died in August 1995.
