= Roy Bicknell =

English footballer and manager

Personal information
- Full name: Roy Bicknell
- Date of birth: 19 February 1926
- Place of birth: Doncaster, England
- Date of death: 31 January 2005 (aged 78)
- Place of death: Colchester, England
- Position: Defender

Youth career
- 1943–1945: Wolverhampton Wanderers

Senior career*
Years	Team	Apps	(Gls)
1945–1947	Wolverhampton Wanderers	1	(0)
- Notts County (guest)
- Swindon Town (guest)
- Middlesbrough (guest)
1947–1949	Charlton Athletic	7	(0)
1949–1951	Bristol City	21	(0)
- Gravesend & Northfleet
1952–1954	Colchester United	25	(0)
- Clacton Town
Total		54	(0)

Managerial career
- 1959–1963: Clacton Town
- Brantham Athletic
- * Club domestic league appearances and goals

Roy Bicknell (19 February 1926 – 31 January 2005) was an English footballer and manager who played in the Football League as a defender. He played for Wolverhampton Wanderers, Charlton Athletic, Bristol City and Colchester United.

== Career ==
Bicknell, born in Doncaster, began his career with Wolverhampton Wanderers during the wartime era, signing professionally at the end of World War II in 1945. He had appeared for Notts County, Swindon Town and Middlesbrough as a guest player during the war years. He made one appearance for the club before moving to Charlton Athletic, the same club that he had made his single Wolves appearance against.

He made his Charlton debut under Jimmy Seed in a 2–1 First Division win over Bolton Wanderers in October 1947, but unable to displace Harold Phipps, he was sold to Bristol City for £2,000 in 1949. He appeared seven times for the Addicks.

Between 1949 and 1951, Bicknell made 21 appearances for City before moving to non-league Gravesend & Northfleet. In 1952, he returned to league football with Colchester United where he made 25 appearances in two years with the U's.

After leaving Colchester, Bicknell joined Clacton Town having been forced to retire from the professional game through injury. He eventually took the reins as first-team manager with Clacton, guiding the club to the Southern League Premier Division – the highest achievement recorded by the Seasiders. He was later forced to sever his ties with Clacton in 1963, briefly returning to management with Brantham Athletic.

== Personal life ==
Bicknell came from a sporting family, his father was a boxer who once fought for the British featherweight title. His cousin Charlie was also a professional footballer who played for Chesterfield, Bradford City and West Ham United.

Bicknell left Clacton Town in 1963 to become a bookmaker. After managing at Brantham, he ran Hythe Coffee Shop in Hythe, near Colchester, alongside former U's teammate Len Jones. He later worked at the County Court, before retiring in 1987.

== Death ==
Roy Bicknell died on 31 January 2005 due to a pulmonary embolism. He had suffered from Alzheimer's disease. He had three children, sons Andrew and Neil and daughter Gay.
