= 1948–49 Southern Football League =

The 1948–49 Southern Football League season was the 46th in the history of the league, an English football competition.

The league consisted of 22 clubs, including all 18 clubs from the previous season, and four newly elected clubs.

- Hastings United, a new club
- Kidderminster Harriers, joined from the Birmingham & District League
- Tonbridge, a new club
- Chingford Town, a new club

Gillingham were champions, winning their second Southern League title. Four Southern League clubs applied to join the Football League at the end of the season, but none was successful.

== League table ==
Southern Football League
- Season: 1948–49
- Champions: Gillingham
- Matches: 462
- Goals: 1,677 (3.63 per match)

Pos	Team	Pld	W	D	L	GF	GA	GR	Pts
1	Gillingham	42	26	10	6	104	48	2.167	62
2	Chelmsford City	42	27	7	8	115	64	1.797	61
3	Merthyr Tydfil	42	26	8	8	133	54	2.463	60
4	Colchester United	42	21	10	11	94	61	1.541	52
5	Worcester City	42	22	7	13	87	56	1.554	51
6	Dartford	42	21	9	12	73	53	1.377	51
7	Gravesend & Northfleet	42	20	9	13	60	46	1.304	49
8	Yeovil Town	42	19	9	14	90	53	1.698	47
9	Cheltenham Town	42	19	9	14	71	64	1.109	47
10	Kidderminster Harriers	42	19	6	17	77	94	0.819	44
11	Exeter City II	42	18	7	17	83	73	1.137	43
12	Hereford United	42	17	6	19	83	84	0.988	40
13	Bath City	42	15	8	19	72	87	0.828	38
14	Hastings United	42	14	10	18	69	93	0.742	38
15	Torquay United II	42	15	7	20	73	93	0.785	37
16	Lovell's Athletic	42	14	8	20	73	74	0.986	36
17	Guildford City	42	12	12	18	58	85	0.682	36
18	Gloucester City	42	12	10	20	78	100	0.780	34
19	Barry Town	42	12	10	20	55	95	0.579	34
20	Tonbridge	42	9	7	26	54	105	0.514	25
21	Chingford Town	42	6	9	27	43	94	0.457	21
22	Bedford Town	42	5	8	29	32	101	0.317	18

Source: rsssf.com
Rules for classification: 1) points; 2) goal ratio.

== Football League elections ==
Eight Southern League clubs applied to join the Football League, but all four League clubs were re-elected.

Club	League	Votes
Bradford City	Football League	45
Southport	Football League	42
Aldershot	Football League	41
Crystal Palace	Football League	40
Worcester City	Southern League	5
Gillingham	Southern League	5
Shrewsbury Town	Midland League	5
Scunthorpe United	Midland League	5
Merthyr Tydfil	Southern League	3
Yeovil Town	Southern League	2
Peterborough United	Midland League	0
Wigan Athletic	Lancashire Combination	0
South Liverpool	Cheshire League	0
North Shields	North Eastern League	0
Nelson	Lancashire Combination	0
