= Harry Wilkinson (footballer, born 1926) =

English footballer

Personal information
- Full name: Harold Sanderson Wilkinson
- Date of birth: 20 March 1926
- Place of birth: Sunderland, England
- Date of death: March 2017 (aged 90)
- Place of death: Lambeth, London South, England
- Position: Wing half

Senior career*
| Years | Team | Apps | (Gls) |
| 1946–1950 | Chelsea | 63 | (32) |
| 1950–1952 | Exeter City | 14 | (4) |
| 1953 | Colchester United | 1 | (0) |
| 1953–? | Folkestone Town | ? | (?) |
- * Club domestic league appearances and goals

Harold Sanderson Wilkinson (20 March 1926 – March 2017) was an English professional footballer who played as a wing half. He played in the Football League for Exeter City and Colchester United before moving into non-league football.
