= Stan Edwards (footballer, born 1926) =

English footballer

Personal information
- Full name: Stanley Llewellyn Edwards
- Date of birth: 17 October 1926
- Place of birth: Dawdon, England
- Date of death: 14 January 1989 (aged 62)
- Position: Forward

Senior career*
Years	Team	Apps	(Gls)
- Horden Colliery Welfare
	Chelsea	1	(0)
1952–1953	Colchester United	19	(7)
1953–1954	Leyton Orient	2	(1)
Total		18	(6)
- * Club domestic league appearances and goals

Stanley Llewellyn Edwards (17 October 1926 – 14 January 1989) was an English footballer who played as a forward in the Football League for Colchester United and Leyton Orient. He was also on the books at Chelsea.

== Career ==
Born in Dawdon, Edwards played for Horden Colliery Welfare before moving to Chelsea. He failed to make an appearance at Chelsea, moving to Colchester United in 1952. He made his debut for Colchester in a 3–1 win against Swindon Town on 6 September 1952, scoring on his debut. He made 16 Football League appearances for the club, scoring five goals. He made his final appearance for the club in a 5–3 away defeat to Leyton Orient on 30 April 1953, scoring a goal for the U's. Coincidentally, Orient was to be his next club after his release from Colchester in the summer of 1953. Edwards made two appearances for the club, scoring once, before retiring from the game. He broke his leg on both appearances for the club.

Stanley Edwards died on 14 January 1989. Leaving widow Pamela and their four children. Steven, Paul, Andrew and Pamela Jane.
