= Jimmy Allen (footballer, born 1909) =

English footballer

Personal information
- Full name: James Phillips Allen
- Date of birth: 16 October 1909
- Place of birth: Poole, England
- Date of death: 5 February 1995 (aged 85)
- Place of death: Southsea, England
- Height: 6 ft 1 in (1.85 m)
- Position: Defender

Senior career*
Years	Team	Apps	(Gls)
- Poole Town
1930–1934	Portsmouth	132	(1)
1934–1939	Aston Villa	147	(2)
Total		279	(3)

International career
1933	England	2	(0)

Managerial career
- 1948–1953: Colchester United
- * Club domestic league appearances and goals

James Phillips Allen (16 October 1909 – 5 February 1995) was an English footballer and football manager who played and coached in the Football League. He played as a defender for Portsmouth and Aston Villa, making over 250 league appearances. He was Aston Villa's record signing and made two appearances for England at full international level.

After World War II, Allen became manager of Colchester United, whom he led from the Southern League into the Football League in 1950.

== Early life ==
Born in Poole, Allen was the youngest boy in a family of thirteen children to Samuel and Fanny Allen. His father was a drayman. He attended St Mary's School in Longfleet, playing football for the school team, and also played for Poole Central.

== Playing career ==
Allen played for his local club Poole Town, earning a transfer to Portsmouth for a sum of £1,200 in 1930. Allen made 132 appearances for Portsmouth, scoring one goal. In 1934, Portsmouth finished as runner-up in the FA Cup against Manchester City, with Allen picking up and injury during the game, and a runners-up medal.

Allen joined Aston Villa in 1934 for a record transfer fee of £10,775. He played in 147 league matches for Villa, scoring two goals, unable to help the club avoid relegation from the First Division in 1936, but captaining the side to the Second Division championship in 1938.

Allen was in his prime when his career was interrupted by the outbreak of World War II. In September 1939, he played in Villa's last pre-war game, a 1–0 defeat at Derby County. On 4th September the Government announced a ban on Sport to prevent crowds gathering. Villa's League match away to Wolves was one of over thirty mid-week League fixtures called-off. Villa Park found itself in an evacuation district designated under the British Government's civilian evacuation scheme. The Police Chief Constable of Birmingham, C.C.H Moriarty, intimated that he would not sanction football matches within the city of Birmingham. The Football League's Scheme for War-time football proposed to limit gates to 8,000 in evacuation areas. With their large overheads, the directors of Aston Villa and Sunderland announced their intention to close down. The manager and players were paid off whilst Villa Park was commandeered by the War Office. Villa's players quickly found war-time employment. Allen became a policeman.

Allen was forced to retire through injury in 1944, following wartime guest appearances for Birmingham City, Chelsea, Crystal Palace, Fulham, Luton Town, Portsmouth and Southampton, where he made eight appearances.

== International career ==
Allen made his international debut for England at the age of 23 in a 3–0 win over Northern Ireland at Windsor Park, Belfast on 14 October 1933 in a British Home Championship match. His second and final appearance for England came in a 2–1 defeat to Wales on 15 November 1933 at St James' Park, Newcastle upon Tyne. He was injured after 36 minutes. Allen was the 588th player to appear for England.

== Managerial career ==
After the war and retiring from playing, Allen became a sports and welfare officer for a Birmingham company, but in 1948 took up the opportunity to manage Colchester United. With the 1947–48 Southern League Cup final postponed until the 1948–49 season, Colchester were required to fulfil two cup finals in the space of 10 days, finishing as runner-up in both to Merthyr Tydfil in the 1948 final and losing to Yeovil Town in the 1949 final. Allen's team finished as runners-up in the Southern League the following season, and also finally found glory in the League Cup with an aggregate win over Bath City. On 3 June 1950, with the expansion of the Third Division South, Colchester were elected to the Football League for the first time in their history under Allen's stewardship. Allen led the U's to 16th and 10th position in the 1950–51 and 1951–52 seasons respectively, but a poor run of form left Colchester to finish 22nd in the 1952–53 season, as Allen resigned on 2 May 1953.

== Managerial statistics ==
Managerial record by team and tenure
Team	From	To	Record				
Team	From	To	P	W	D	L	Win %
Colchester United	22 June 1948	2 May 1953	249	108	59	82	43.4

All statistics referenced by:

== Later life ==
Following his departure from Colchester, he became a landlord in Southsea. He died in Southsea aged 85 on 5 February 1995.

== Honours ==
=== As a player ===
Portsmouth

- FA Cup runner-up: 1933–34

Aston Villa

- Football League Second Division: 1937–38

=== As manager ===
Colchester United

- Southern League Cup: 1949–50; runner-up: 1947–48, 1948–49

All honours referenced by:
