= José Gallego (footballer, born 1923) =

Spanish footballer (1923–2006)

Personal information
- Full name: José Augustin Gallego
- Date of birth: 8 April 1923
- Place of birth: Errenteria, Spain
- Date of death: 17 September 2006 (aged 83)
- Place of death: Cambridge, England
- Height: 5 ft 7 in (1.70 m)
- Position: Outside forward

Senior career*
Years	Team	Apps	(Gls)
1942–1946	Cambridge Town		
1947–1948	Brentford	6	(0)
1948–1950	Southampton	1	(0)
1950–1952	Colchester United	4	(0)
1952–1957	Cambridge United		
1957–19??	Biggleswade Town		
–	Exning		
- * Club domestic league appearances and goals

José Augustin "Joe" Gallego (8 April 1923 – 17 September 2006), was a Spanish footballer who played as an outside forward for various clubs in the English Football League in the 1940s and 1950s.

== Football career ==
Gallego was born in Errenteria in the Basque Country in Spain. His father was a Spanish government worker who fled to England as a refugee in 1937 during the Spanish Civil War. Gallego arrived in England as a 14-year-old along with his three sisters and his younger brother, Antonio (Tony), who was also to have a short career as a professional footballer, as a goalkeeper with Norwich City. Some of the other refugees also became footballers, including Raimundo Pérez Lezama, Sabino Barinaga and Emilio Aldecoa.

The family settled in Cambridge where José first played football with Cambridge Town in 1942. In 1945, he was joined by Antonio in the Cambridge Town side, now coached by former West Ham United, Southampton and England forward Vic Watson and in 1946 the team won the East Anglian Cup.

In January 1947, Gallego moved to Brentford of the Football League Second Division, where he stayed for a season and a half, making six league appearances.

In the summer of 1948, he moved to fellow Second Division club, Southampton. Although he scored on his debut for the reserve team, he made only one first-team appearance when he replaced the injured Wilf Grant at outside-left in a 3–0 defeat at Barnsley on 2 October 1948. Gallego was the seventh player that season to have worn the No. 11 shirt, before Grant returned for the next match. Although his debut was described as "most promising" and "deserving another try", Gallego suffered from a cracked ankle after being given a "hard time" by the Barnsley full-back and decided to quit full-time professional football.

Southampton tried to sell him to Exeter City in the summer of 1950, but Gallego refused and instead joined Colchester United along with his Southampton team–mate Bill Rochford. Colchester were embarking on their first season in the Football League, but Gallego only made four appearances before dropping down to non-league football.

He then enjoyed six seasons of part-time football back at Cambridge, this time with Cambridge United and played minor league football until after his 50th birthday.

== Career outside football ==
Gallego worked for thirty years for the Gas Board in Cambridge as a meter inspector and continued to play golf until well after his 80th birthday.

Gallego died on 17 September 2006 at the age of 83.
