= Stan Foxall =

English footballer

- Foxall at Colchester United

Personal information
- Full name: Joseph Stanley Foxall
- Date of birth: 8 September 1914
- Place of birth: Crowle, England
- Date of death: 12 August 1991 (aged 76)
- Height: 5 ft 10 1/2 in (1.79 m)
- Position: Forward

Senior career*
Years	Team	Apps	(Gls)
1931–1934	Gainsborough Trinity		(?)
1934–1944	West Ham United	106	(37)
1948–1950	Colchester United	86	(16)
- Chelmsford City
- * Club domestic league appearances and goals

Joseph Stanley Foxall (8 September 1914 – 12 August 1991) was an English footballer who played in the Football League as a forward for West Ham United.

== Career ==
Born in Crowle, Lincolnshire, Foxall had been playing football at Gainsborough Trinity, where he spent three seasons, before being signed by West Ham United in 1934. He made four league appearances in his first season, replacing John Foreman on the right wing.

He represented the London Combination against the Central League in November 1936.

Foxall could operate anywhere along the forward line, and was often moved from the right wing to a more central role, swapping with Sam Small, by Charlie Paynter.

Foxall made 149 war-time league and cup appearances for the east London club, scoring 63 goals, and was a member of the team that won the Football League War Cup in 1940.

His career at West Ham was cut short by a knee injury sustained in a game against Queens Park Rangers in September 1944.

He subsequently joined Southern League side Colchester United in 1948, where he spent two seasons.

He later played for Chelmsford City.

== Honours ==
=== Club ===
West Ham United

- Football League War Cup Winner (1): 1939–40

Colchester United

- Southern Football League Runner-up (1): 1949–50
- Southern Football League Cup Winner (1): 1949–50
- Southern Football League Cup Runner-up (2): 1947–48, 1948–49
