= Alf Miller =

English footballer and coach

Personal information
- Full name: Alfred George Abraham Miller
- Date of birth: 25 March 1917
- Place of birth: Portsmouth, England
- Date of death: 2 August 1999 (aged 82)
- Place of death: Portsmouth, England
- Position: Wing half

Senior career*
Years	Team	Apps	(Gls)
1935	Portsmouth	0	(0)
- Ryde Sports
- Margate
1936–1937	Bristol Rovers	0	(0)
1937–1939	Southport	32	(2)
1939–1948	Plymouth Argyle	9	(0)
1942–1945	→ Aldershot (guest)		
1948–1949	Colchester United	2	(0)
Total		43	(2)

Managerial career
- 1955: Colchester United (caretaker)
- * Club domestic league appearances and goals

Alfred George Abraham Miller (25 March 1917 – 2 August 1999), also known as Dusty Miller, was an English professional footballer and coach who played as a wing half in the Football League for Southport and Plymouth Argyle.

Miller began his career with his hometown club Portsmouth but never appeared for the first-team. He ventured into non-League football before being handed another opportunity in the Football League by Bristol Rovers. Again, he failed to break into the first-team, but a move to Southport saw him make his professional debut in 1937. Two years with Southport amounted to 32 appearances and a move to Plymouth Argyle, but World War II broke out before Miller could make any appearances for the club.

Miller spent the war years making guest appearances for Aldershot, and finally made his debut for Plymouth in 1946. After injury interrupted his return, he made a move to Colchester United in 1948, where he played just twice before becoming a member of the club's coaching staff. He was briefly caretaker manager with Claude Orrin in early 1955.

== Career ==
Born in Portsmouth, Miller was on the books of his hometown club Portsmouth as late as 1935, but after failing to break through into the first-team, he moved into non-League football with Ryde Sports. He later made appearances for Margate before Bristol Rovers signed him in 1936.

After again failing to make a breakthrough, Miller was on the move, this time to Southport ahead of the 1937–38 season. He scored two goals in 32 appearances for the club.

Miller was signed by Plymouth Argyle in 1939, but with the outbreak of World War II he had to wait until 1946 to get his first taste of first-team football with Plymouth. Because Plymouth did not play football during the war years, Miller made guest appearances for Aldershot, playing approximately 25 times between 1942 and 1945.

Once the war was over, Miller was named captain of Argyle and made his long-awaited debut in a 3–1 win against West Ham United on 31 August 1946. He played the first eight games of the season, but injury ruled him out of the remainder of the campaign. He made just one appearance in 1947–48 and was released at the end of the season.

With injury limiting his playing time, Miller made just two appearances for his next club, Colchester United, both games within three days of one another in September 1948. Colchester kept Miller on at the end of the season as a coach, replacing the outgoing Jack Kearton. Miller and club secretary Claude Orrin took charge of first-team affairs in January 1955 after Jack Butler had tendered his resignation after suffering ill health. The pair were in charge until a new manager was appointed in Benny Fenton in March.

After leaving the game, Miller returned to his native Portsmouth, going into the grocery business.

== Managerial statistics ==
Team	From	To	Record				
Team	From	To	P	W	D	L	Win %
Colchester United (Caretaker)	14 January 1955	28 February 1955	5	1	2	2	20.0
