= Dawdon =

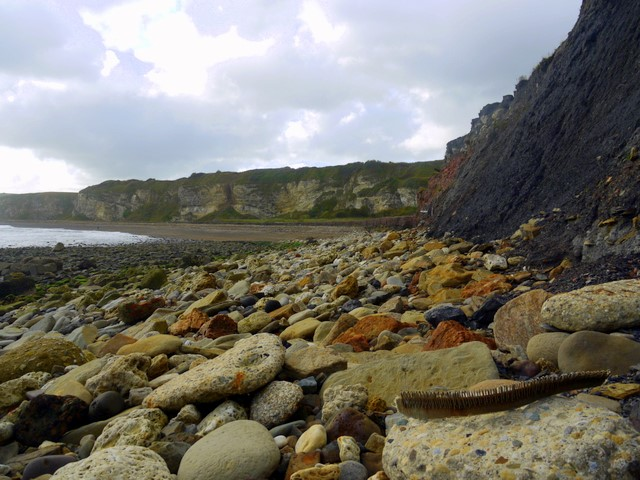
- Lumps of coal among the rocks on Dawdon Blast Beach

- Location within County Durham
- Population: 7,220 (2011 census)
- OS grid reference: NZ433484
- Civil parish: Seaham
- Unitary authority: County Durham
- Ceremonial county: Durham
- Region: North East
- Country: England
- Sovereign state: United Kingdom
- Post town: SEAHAM
- Postcode district: SR7
- Dialling code: 0191
- Police: Durham
- Fire: County Durham and Darlington
- Ambulance: North East
- UK Parliament: Easington

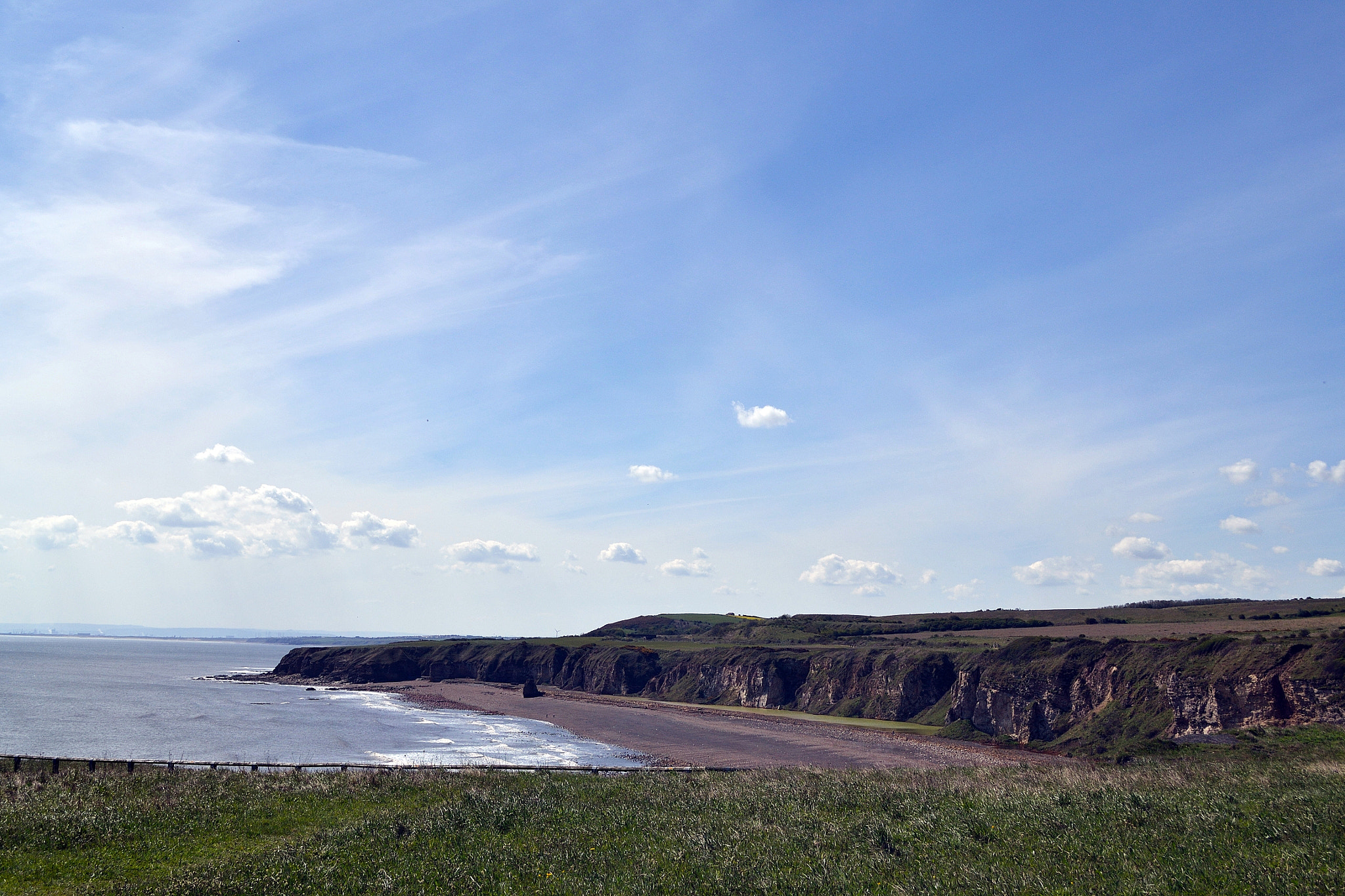
Blast Beach near Dawdon was used for exterior shots of the planet Fiorina "Fury" 161 in Alien 3.

Dawdon is a former pit community to the south of Seaham, in County Durham, England. An area of the beach near Dawdon (known locally as "the Blast", a former waste coal dumping site) was used in the opening scenes of the science fiction film Alien 3.

== History ==
The township of Dawdon (commonly spelled Dawden on old records and maps) was in the parish of Dalton-le-Dale and consisted of an area of 1,088 acres between the Durham coast and the townships of Seaham, Dalton-le-Dale and Cold Hesledon. Seaham Harbour was built in the township. The port and town grew during the 19th century. In 1866 Dawdon became a separate civil parish and became part of Seaham Harbour urban district, on 1 April 1937 the parish was abolished and merged with Seaham. and became part of the new Seaham urban district.

"The population in 1801 was 22; in 1811, 27; in 1821, 35; in 1831, in consequence of the construction of a new harbour, it had increased to 1022; in 1841, 2017; in 1851, 3538; in 1861, 6137; in 1871, 7132; in 1881, 7714; and in 1891, 9044." In 1931 the parish had a population of 19,399.

== Climate ==
Dawdon

Climate chart (precipitation, max. and min. temperature)
J	F	M	A	M	J	J	A	S	O	N	D
56 6 1	39 7 1	51 9 2	52 11 3	50 15 6	55 17 9	45 20 11	61 20 11	58 17 9	57 13 6	62 9 3	59 7 2
- █ Average max. and min. temperatures in °C
- █ Precipitation totals in mm
Imperial conversion
J	F	M	A	M	J	J	A	S	O	N	D
2.2 43 33	1.5 44 33	2 48 36	2 52 38	1.9 58 42	2.2 63 47	1.8 68 51	2.4 67 51	2.3 62 47	2.2 55 43	2.4 48 38	2.3 45 35
- █ Average max. and min. temperatures in °F
- █ Precipitation totals in inches

Like the rest of the United Kingdom, Dawdon has a temperate climate. At 643.3 millimetres (25 in) the average annual rainfall is lower than the national average of 1,125 millimetres (44 in). Equally there are only around 121.3 days where more than 1 millimetre (0.04 in) of rain falls compared with a national average of 154.4 days. The area sees on average 1374.6 hours of sunshine per year, compared with a national average of 1125.0 hours. There is frost on 52 days compared with a national average of 55.6 days. Average daily maximum and minimum temperatures are 12.5 °C (54.5 °F) and 5.2 °C (41.4 °F) compared with a national averages of 12.1 °C (53.8 °F) and 5.1 °C (41.2 °F) respectively.

The table below gives the average temperature and rainfall figures taken between 1971 and 2000 at the Met Office weather station in Durham:

Climate data for Durham Coordinates 54°46′04″N 1°35′04″W; elevation: 102 m (335 ft) 1991–2020 normals, extremes 1843–2023
Month	Jan	Feb	Mar	Apr	May	Jun	Jul	Aug	Sep	Oct	Nov	Dec	Year
Record high °C (°F)	16.3 (61.3)	17.4 (63.3)	21.8 (71.2)	24.1 (75.4)	29.0 (84.2)	30.4 (86.7)	36.9 (98.4)	32.5 (90.5)	30.0 (86.0)	25.3 (77.5)	19.3 (66.7)	15.9 (60.6)	36.9 (98.4)
Mean daily maximum °C (°F)	6.9 (44.4)	7.8 (46.0)	9.9 (49.8)	12.5 (54.5)	15.4 (59.7)	18.0 (64.4)	20.2 (68.4)	19.9 (67.8)	17.4 (63.3)	13.5 (56.3)	9.7 (49.5)	7.1 (44.8)	13.2 (55.8)
Daily mean °C (°F)	4.1 (39.4)	4.6 (40.3)	6.2 (43.2)	8.3 (46.9)	10.9 (51.6)	13.6 (56.5)	15.8 (60.4)	15.6 (60.1)	13.3 (55.9)	10.0 (50.0)	6.6 (43.9)	4.2 (39.6)	9.5 (49.1)
Mean daily minimum °C (°F)	1.3 (34.3)	1.4 (34.5)	2.5 (36.5)	4.1 (39.4)	6.5 (43.7)	9.3 (48.7)	11.3 (52.3)	11.3 (52.3)	9.2 (48.6)	6.5 (43.7)	3.6 (38.5)	1.4 (34.5)	5.7 (42.3)
Record low °C (°F)	−16.9 (1.6)	−18.0 (−0.4)	−15.0 (5.0)	−11.1 (12.0)	−4.8 (23.4)	−0.8 (30.6)	1.4 (34.5)	0.0 (32.0)	−1.7 (28.9)	−5.3 (22.5)	−12.0 (10.4)	−16.4 (2.5)	−18.0 (−0.4)
Average precipitation mm (inches)	51.8 (2.04)	44.6 (1.76)	41.1 (1.62)	51.2 (2.02)	44.4 (1.75)	61.0 (2.40)	60.9 (2.40)	66.5 (2.62)	56.9 (2.24)	63.4 (2.50)	73.0 (2.87)	61.0 (2.40)	675.7 (26.60)
Average precipitation days (≥ 1.0 mm)	11.8	9.9	8.6	9.1	8.6	9.9	10.7	10.3	9.4	11.8	12.0	12.0	124.1
Mean monthly sunshine hours	60.9	84.4	121.7	160.8	187.1	167.1	174.3	167.3	135.3	98.9	64.6	57.6	1,480
Source 1: Met Office
Source 2: Durham Weather

== Dawdon Colliery ==
A new pit was created at Dawdon and new shafts sunk in the rocky coastal area of Noses Point, near Dawdon beginning in 1900. The colliery opened for production in 1907. Dawdon Colliery closed on the 25th of July, 1991.

== Dawdon Miners' Welfare Club ==
The Club was a prominent community hub built in 1909 and funded by contributions from local coal miners. The club served as a central venue for social gatherings, including weddings, wakes, and public meetings, and held cultural significance in the area. It also featured in the 2000 film Billy Elliot, symbolizing the community's mining heritage.

== See also ==
- History of County Durham
