= Noel Simpson (footballer) =

English footballer

Personal information
- Date of birth: 23 December 1922
- Place of birth: Mansfield, England
- Date of death: 21 November 1987 (aged 64)
- Place of death: Kirkby-in-Ashfield, England
- Position: Wing half

Senior career*
Years	Team	Apps	(Gls)
1946–1948	Nottingham Forest	47	(3)
1948–1957	Coventry City	258	(8)
1957–1958	Exeter City	33	(0)
Total		338	(11)
- * Club domestic league appearances and goals

Noel Simpson (23 December 1922 – 21 November 1987) was an English professional footballer who played as a wing half.

== Career ==
Born in Mansfield, Simpson played for Nottingham Forest, Coventry City and Exeter City.
