= Fred Cutting =

English footballer

Personal information
- Full name: Noel Frederick Charles Cutting
- Date of birth: 4 December 1921
- Place of birth: North Walsham, England
- Date of death: 1997 (aged 75–76)
- Position: Inside forward

Senior career*
Years	Team	Apps	(Gls)
1945–1946	Leicester City	0	(0)
1946–1947	Norwich City	0	(0)
1947–1951	Colchester United	133	(59)
1951–?	Great Yarmouth Town	?	(?)
- * Club domestic league appearances and goals

Noel Frederick Charles Cutting (4 December 1921 – 1997) was an English professional footballer who played as an inside forward.

== Career ==
Cutting most notably played for Colchester United, but also spent time at Football League sides Leicester and Norwich, although he did not register any league appearances. After playing for Colchester, he went on to play for Great Yarmouth Town.

== Honours ==
=== Club ===
Colchester United

- Southern Football League runner-up: 1949–50
- Southern Football League Cup winner: 1949–50
- Southern Football League Cup runner-up: 1947–48, 1948–49
