= Bill Layton =

English footballer

Personal information
- Full name: William Herbert Layton
- Date of birth: 13 January 1915
- Place of birth: Shirley, England
- Date of death: February 1984 (aged 69)
- Position: Wing half

Senior career*
| Years | Team | Apps | (Gls) |
| 1937–1946 | Reading | 51 | (17) |
| 1946–1949 | Bradford Park Avenue | 47 | (5) |
| 1949–1951 | Colchester United | 44 | (7) |
| 1951–1954 | Harwich & Parkeston | | |
- * Club domestic league appearances and goals

William Herbert Layton (13 January 1915 – February 1984) was an English footballer who played as a wing half. Layton was born in Shirley, and made appearances in the Football League for Reading, Bradford Park Avenue and Colchester United. He also played in the Southern League for Colchester before their admission to the Football League.

In 1951, Layton left League football to become player-manager at amateur side Harwich & Parkeston. Under his management, the club reached the final of the FA Amateur Cup in 1953. At the end of the 1953–54 season, Layton retired from football to focus on managing the Garland Hotel in Parkeston.

== Honours ==
Colchester United

- Southern League runner-up: 1949–50
- Southern League Cup: 1949–50
