= Denis Maffey =

English footballer

Personal information
- Full name: Denis Maffey
- Date of birth: 22 February 1922
- Place of birth: Sunderland, England
- Date of death: 1995 (aged 72–73)
- Position: Forward

Senior career*
Years	Team	Apps	(Gls)
- Crook Town
- Walton United
1947–1948	Ipswich Town	5	(1)
1948–1949	Colchester United	33	(1)
Total		38	(2)
- * Club domestic league appearances and goals

Denis Maffey (22 February 1922 – 1995) was an English footballer who played in the Football League as a forward for Ipswich Town.

== Career ==
Maffey, born in Sunderland, began his career with non-league clubs Crook Town and Walton United before signing for Ipswich Town in July 1947. He made his Football League debut on 23 August 1947 in a Third Division South 2–0 win over Notts County at Portman Road. Maffey made five league appearances for the club, scoring one goal before making his final appearance for Town on 10 September 1947 in a 1–0 away defeat at Exeter City.

After leaving Ipswich, Maffey joined Southern League club Colchester United, making his debut on 18 December 1948 in a 3–2 win over Hereford United. He made 33 league appearances for Colchester in the league and scored one goal on 28 April 1949 in a 3–0 win against Worcester City at Layer Road. He made his final appearance on 29 October 1949 in a 5–3 away victory against Torquay United Reserves. He was then released by Colchester and retired from the game age 27.

Denis Maffey died in 1995.

== Honours ==
Colchester United

- 1948–49 Southern League Cup runner-up

All honours referenced by:
