= George Wright (footballer, born 1919) =

English footballer (1919–2008)

Personal information
- Full name: George William Wright
- Date of birth: 10 October 1919
- Place of birth: Plymouth, England
- Date of death: 2008
- Position: Goalkeeper

Senior career*
Years	Team	Apps	(Gls)
1938–1949	Plymouth Argyle	12	(0)
1949–1955	Colchester United	195	(0)
- * Club domestic league appearances and goals

George William Wright (10 October 1919 – 2008) was an English professional footballer who played as a goalkeeper.

== Career ==
Goalkeeper Wright played against future club Colchester United for Plymouth Argyle's reserves side (the first visiting side to win at Layer Road) before moving to the club in 1949, where he made 195 appearances in The Football League and the Southern Football League.

He established himself in the team and was a main last line of defence at the club until 1955.
