= George French (footballer, born 1926) =

English footballer

Personal information
- Full name: George Noah French
- Date of birth: 10 November 1926
- Place of birth: Colchester, England
- Date of death: 19 July 2012 (aged 85)
- Place of death: Colchester, England
- Position: Full-back

Senior career*
Years	Team	Apps	(Gls)
1952–1954	Colchester United	3	(0)
- Parkside
Total		3	(0)
- * Club domestic league appearances and goals

George Noah French (10 November 1926 – 19 July 2012) was an English footballer who played as a full-back in the Football League for Colchester United.

== Career ==
Born in Colchester, French joined Colchester United in 1952 from amateur forms, making his debut for the club in a Third Division South 1–1 draw with Gillingham on 4 October at Layer Road. He made two further appearances for Colchester, with his final game coming on 19 September 1953, a 3–0 away defeat to Swindon Town. French then returned to non-league football with local club Parkside.

George French died on 19 July 2012.
