= Chingford Town F.C. =

Chingford Town
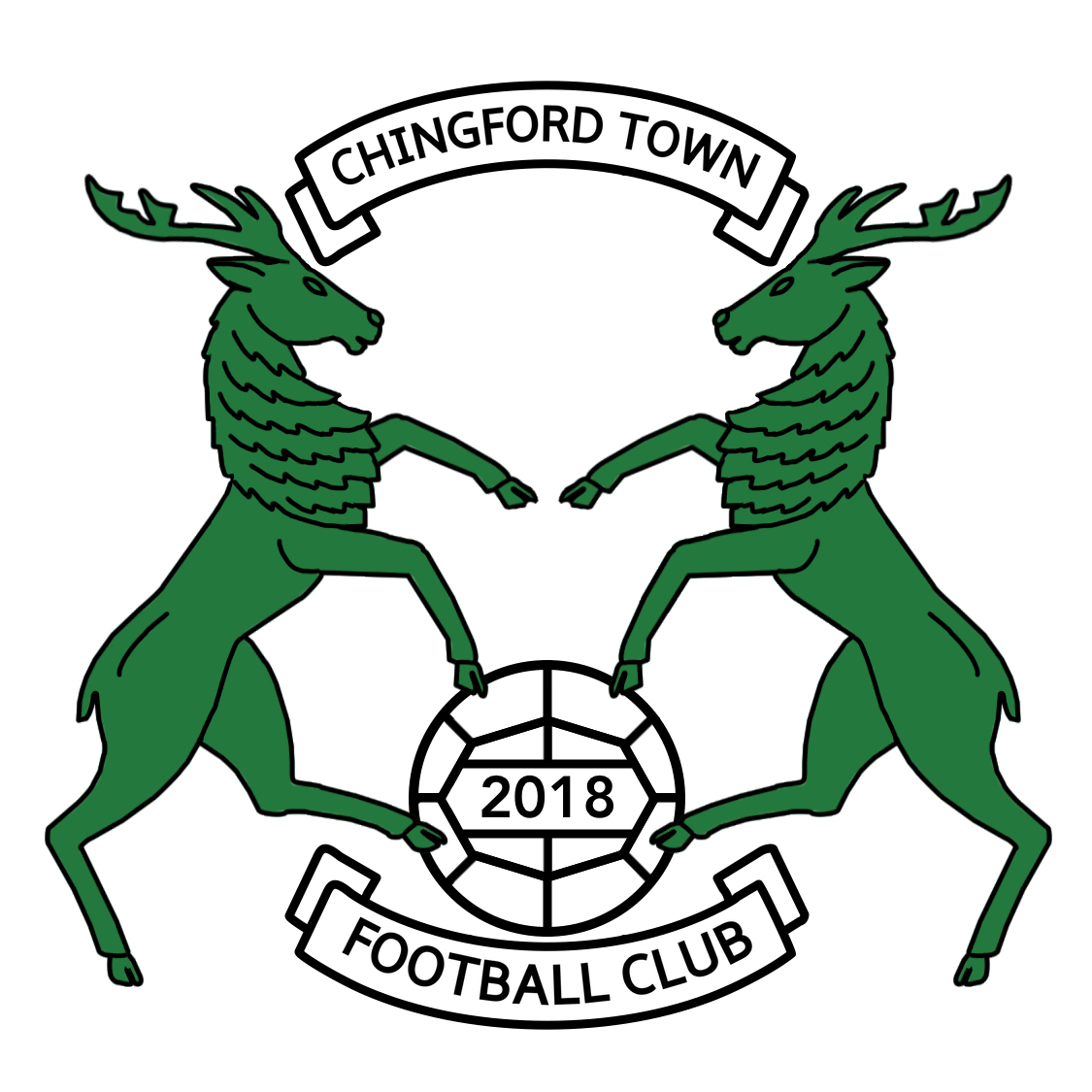
- The Chingford Town FC Badge
- Full name: Chingford Town
- Nickname(s): The Stags
- Founded: 2018
- Chairman: Karl Tew
- Manager: Jack Tew
- 2018–2019: 4th
- Website: http://www.chingfordtown.com/
Home colours	Away colours

Chingford Town Football Club is an amateur football club based in Chingford, London.

Chingford Town was founded in 1947, and played in the post-war amateur leagues until dissolving in 1950. The club was reformed in 2014, playing in the amateur leagues of Essex until once again dissolving in 2016. The most recent version of the club was founded in 2018 and currently plays in the amateur leagues of Essex, with the goal of providing Chingford with a professional football team inspired by the district's rich footballing culture.

== Badge ==
The three iterations of Chingford Town FC have all prominently featured the stag, a commonly featured animal in local schools and organisations.
