= Harry Bearryman =

English footballer

Personal information
- Full name: Henry William Bearryman
- Date of birth: 26 September 1924
- Place of birth: Wandsworth, London, England
- Date of death: December 1976 (age 52)
- Position: Wing half

Youth career
- Chelsea

Senior career*
| Years | Team | Apps | (Gls) |
| 1941–1947 | Chelsea | 0 | (0) |
| 1947–1954 | Colchester United | 293 | (8) |
| 1954–1955 | Metropolitan Police | ? | (?) |
- * Club domestic league appearances and goals

Henry William "Harry" Bearryman (26 September 1924 – December 1976), was an English footballer who played as a wing half in the Football League.

== Career ==
Born in Wandsworth, London, Bearryman began his career at Chelsea where he made 35 appearances during his time there. He joined Colchester United in 1947 and made 173 appearances in the Football League and 120 appearances in the Southern Football League. Bearryman left the U's in 1954 and joined the Metropolitan Police football team. He died in December 1976.

== Honours ==
=== Club ===
Colchester United

- Southern Football League Runner-up (1): 1949–50
- Southern Football League Cup Winner (1): 1949–50
- Southern Football League Cup Runner-up (1): 1948–49
