= 1946–47 Colchester United F.C. season =

Colchester United
1946–47 season
- Chairman: Bill Allen
- Manager: Ted Fenton (from 15 April 1946)
- Stadium: Layer Road
- Southern League: 8th
- FA Cup: 1st round (eliminated by Reading)
- Southern League Cup: Semi-final (eliminated by Gillingham)
- Top goalscorer: League: Arthur Turner (22); All: Arthur Turner (24)
- Highest home attendance: 6,787 v Gothic, 16 November 1946
- Lowest home attendance: 2,661 v Barry Town, 8 February 1947
- Average home league attendance: 6,218
- Biggest win: 6–1 v Exeter City Reserves, 19 October 1946
- Biggest defeat: 0–5 v Reading, 30 November 1946
Home colours

The 1946–47 season was Colchester United's fifth season in their history and their fifth in the Southern League. Alongside competing in the Southern League, the club also participated in the FA Cup and Southern League Cup. New manager Ted Fenton began to assemble a team of professionals following the reliance on guest players during the 1945–46 season, as the club finished 8th in the league. They reached the first round of the FA Cup, but were defeated by Football League side Reading. They were also Southern League Cup semi-finalists, defeated at Priestfield Stadium by Gillingham.

== Season overview ==
New manager Ted Fenton joined the club for the 1946–47 season. He was no stranger to Layer Road, having turned out for Colchester Town in the 1930s whilst a teenager. Fenton's contacts meant that he could quickly assemble a squad of professionals following the war years, which would eventually include 28 part-time professionals. The team would finish mid-table during Fenton's first season.

During the season, the stadium had its Main Stand extended, and the property behind what would become the Barside was purchased to overcome disputes regarding access by supporters to that side of the ground. At the end of the season, the Popular Side stand was demolished, and the timbers were reused to improve the Layer Road End. Meanwhile, the Main Stand had a boundary wall built that would prevent supporters attempting to enter the ground without paying.

== Players ==
As of match played 7 June 1947.

Name	Position	Nationality	Place of birth	Date of birth	Apps	Goals	Signed from	Date signed	Fee
Goalkeepers
Peter Chiswick	GK	(England)	Plaistow	19 September 1929 (aged 16)	0	0	(England) West Ham United	14 July 1946	Free transfer
John Jelly	GK				0	0	(England) Colchester Casuals	4 September 1946 (Note: Date of signing refers to the date of the player's first game for the club)	Free transfer
Harry Wright	GK	(England)	Tottenham	3 June 1909 (aged 36)	0	0	(England) Chelmsford City	11 July 1946	Free transfer
Defenders
Bill Bower	FB	(Wales)	Wrexham	17 November 1911 (aged 34)	30	1	(England) Millwall	28 November 1945	Free transfer
Bob Harding	CB				0	0		14 September 1946	
Digger Kettle	FB	(England)	Colchester	3 June 1922 (aged 23)	0	0	(England) Arclight Sports	September 1946	Free transfer
Albert Page	CB	(England)	Walthamstow	18 March 1916 (aged 30)	0	0	(England) Tottenham Hotspur	26 March 1947	Free transfer
Albert Walker	FB	(England)	Little Lever	4 February 1910 (aged 36)	0	0	(England) Doncaster Rovers	30 May 1946	Free transfer
Midfielders
Arthur Biggs	WH	(England)	Wootton	26 May 1915 (aged 31)	0	0	(England) Bedford Town	7 May 1947	Free transfer
Ted Fenton	WH	(England)	Forest Gate	7 November 1914 (aged 31)	0	0	(England) West Ham United	15 April 1946	Free transfer
John Leah	RH	(England)	Liverpool		0	0	(England) South Liverpool	18 July 1946	Free transfer
Frank Stamper	WH/IR	(England)	Hartlepool	22 February 1926 (aged 20)	0	0	Colchester Garrison Army Fire Fighting Centre	3 March 1947	Free transfer
Forwards
Dennis Cant	CF	(England)	Fordham		0	0	(England) Crittall Athletic	15 August 1946	Free transfer
Len Cater	CF	(England)	Colchester		0	0	Free agent	6 June 1946	Free transfer
Bob Curry	IF	(England)	Gateshead	2 November 1918 (aged 27)	0	0	(England) Gainsborough Trinity	13 June 1946	Free transfer
Ian Gillespie	IF	(England)	Plymouth	6 May 1913 (aged 33)	0	0	(England) Ipswich Town	15 May 1947	Free transfer
Dennis Hillman	WG	(England)	Southend-on-Sea	27 November 1918 (aged 27)	0	0	(England) Brighton & Hove Albion	21 September 1946	Free transfer
Bob Hodgson	CF				9	5	(England) South Shields	February 1946	Free transfer
Bob Hutchings	LW	(England)	Southwark		12	0	Colchester Garrison (No. 1 Holding Battalion)	9 February 1946	Free transfer
Bob Neville	OL				0	0	(England) Rowhedge	October 1946	Free transfer
Alan Ross	OL	(Scotland)	Methil	22 February 1922 (aged 24)	0	0	(England) Ipswich Town	25 July 1946	Free transfer
Trevor Smith	IF	(England)	Stanley	8 September 1910 (aged 35)	0	0	(England) Yeovil Town	March 1947	Free transfer
Arthur Turner	CF	(England)	Poplar	22 January 1921 (aged 25)	0	0	(England) Charlton Athletic	September 1946	Free transfer

== Transfers ==
=== In ===
Date	Position	Nationality	Name	From	Fee	Ref.
15 April 1946	WH	(England)	Ted Fenton	(England) West Ham United	Player-manager	
30 May 1946	FB	(England)	Albert Walker	(England) Doncaster Rovers	Free transfer	
6 June 1946	CF	(England)	Len Cater	Free agent	Free transfer	
13 June 1946	IF	(England)	Bob Curry	(England) Gainsborough Trinity	Free transfer	
4 July 1946	WG	(England)	Wilf Bott	(England) Queens Park Rangers	Free transfer	
11 July 1946	GK	(England)	Harry Wright	(England) Chelmsford City	Free transfer	
14 July 1946	GK	(England)	Peter Chiswick	(England) West Ham United	Free transfer	
18 July 1946	RH	(England)	John Leah	(England) South Liverpool	Free transfer	
25 July 1946	OL	(Scotland)	Alan Ross	(England) Ipswich Town	Free transfer	
28 July 1946	CF	(Scotland)	Alex Stewart	British Army	Trial	
8 August 1946	WG	(England)	Jack Finch	(England) Fulham	Free transfer	
15 August 1946	CF	(England)	Dennis Cant	(England) Crittall Athletic	Free transfer	
31 August 1946	LW	(Scotland)	Sid Smith	(Scotland) Dundee United	Free transfer	(Note: Date of signing refers to the date of the player's first game for the club)
September 1946	FB	(England)	Digger Kettle	(England) Arclight Sports	Free transfer	
September 1946	CF	(England)	Arthur Turner	(England) Charlton Athletic	Free transfer	
4 September 1946	GK		John Jelly	(England) Colchester Casuals	Free transfer	
14 September 1946	CB		Bob Harding	Unknown	Free transfer	
21 September 1946	WG	(England)	Dennis Hillman	(England) Brighton & Hove Albion	Free transfer	
October 1946	OL		Bob Neville	(England) Rowhedge	Free transfer	
10 October 1946	IR		Stan Gibbs	Royal Air Force	Free transfer	
7 December 1946	CB		Don Swift	(England) Severall's Athletic	Free transfer	
March 1947	IF	(England)	Trevor Smith	(England) Yeovil Town	Free transfer	
3 March 1947	WH/IR	(England)	Frank Stamper	Army Fire Fighting Centre	Free transfer	
26 March 1947	CB	(England)	Albert Page	(England) Tottenham Hotspur	Free transfer	
7 May 1947	WH	(England)	Arthur Biggs	(England) Bedford Town	Free transfer	
15 May 1947	IF	(England)	Ian Gillespie	(England) Ipswich Town	Free transfer	
7 June 1947	FW	(England)	Bill Jeffries	(England) Hull City	Trial	

=== Out ===
Date	Position	Nationality	Name	To	Fee	Ref.
End of season	CF	(England)	Bob Gregg	Free agent	Released	
End of season	IR		Bobby Hoines	Free agent	Released	
End of season	CH		Jimmy Jenkins	Free agent	Released	
8 May 1946	CF	(England)	Frank Rawcliffe	(England) Newport County	£250	
31 August 1946	CF	(Scotland)	Alex Stewart	Free agent	Released	(Note: Date of departure refers to the date of the player's final game for the club)
September 1946	CF		Chris Harman	Free agent	Released	
7 September 1946	WG	(England)	Jack Finch	Free agent	Released	
October 1946	WG	(England)	Wilf Bott	(England) Guildford City	Free transfer	
November 1946	FB	(Ireland)	Paddy Shiels	Free agent	Released	
November 1946	LW	(Scotland)	Sid Smith	Free agent	Released	
30 November 1946	OL	(England)	Bob Collins	Free agent	Released	
25 December 1946	CB		Don Swift	Free agent	Released	
January 1947	IR	(Scotland)	Tom Tobin	(England) Clacton Town	Free transfer	
April 1947	IR		Stan Gibbs	Free agent	Released	
19 April 1947	DF	(England)	Syd Fieldus	Colchester United	Management staff	
7 June 1947	FW	(England)	Bill Jeffries	(England) Hull City	End of trial	

- Total incoming: ▲ ~ £250

== Match details ==
=== Friendlies ===
21 September 1946 Friendly	Colchester United	3–0	West Ham United Reserves	Colchester
	Hillman 32'; Turner 44', 55'	Report		Stadium: Layer Road; Attendance: 4,912

21 December 1946 Friendly	Colchester United	2–0	Southend United	Colchester
14:15	Turner 72'; Neville 88'	Report		Stadium: Layer Road

28 December 1946 Friendly	Colchester United	3–0	Watford	Colchester
14:15	Hutchings 10'; Turner 30'; Hillman	Report		Stadium: Layer Road

1 February 1947 Friendly	Colchester United	P–P	Short Sports (Rochester)	Colchester
		Report		Stadium: Layer Road

7 April 1947 Friendly	Colchester United	3–0	(Netherlands) Zwolle Representative XI	Colchester
	Page 54'; Turner; Cater	Report		Stadium: Layer Road

=== Southern League ===
==== League table ====
Pos	Team	Pld	W	D	L	GF	GA	GR	Pts	Results
6	Gravesend & Northfleet	32	17	4	11	82	58	1.414	38	
7	Barry Town	32	14	8	10	89	61	1.459	36	
8	Colchester United	32	15	5	12	65	60	1.083	35	
9	Cheltenham Town	32	14	4	14	68	75	0.907	32	
10	Millwall	32	8	13	11	59	57	1.035	29	Resigned from the league

Source: rsssf.com
Rules for classification: 1) points; 2) goal ratio.

==== Matches ====
31 August 1946 1	Colchester United	2–3	Gloucester City	Colchester
	Stewart 42'; Curry 75'	Report	Griffiths 46'; Davis 85'	Stadium: Layer Road; Attendance: 6,300

4 September 1946 2	Chelmsford City	3–0	Colchester United	Chelmsford
	Foreman 13'; Burley 53'; Somerfield 86'	Report		Stadium: New Writtle Street

7 September 1946 3	Exeter City Reserves	3–1	Colchester United	Exeter
	Rue 15'; Challis 53'; Mustard 79'	Report	Cant 78'	Stadium: St James Park

14 September 1946 4	Colchester United	2–1	Hereford United	Colchester
15:30	Cater 11'; Hodgson	Report	Copp 60'	Stadium: Layer Road

19 September 1946 5	Colchester United	3–2	Millwall Reserves	Colchester
	Own goal Curry; Cater	Report	Unknown goalscorer	Stadium: Layer Road

28 September 1946 6	Colchester United	3–2	Worcester City	Colchester
	Turner 15', 70' (pen.); Curry 39'	Report	Burns 30'; Horton 80'	Stadium: Layer Road; Attendance: 6,143

5 October 1946 7	Colchester United	4–3	Yeovil Town	Colchester
15:15	Cant; Cater	Report	Sibley; White	Stadium: Layer Road

12 October 1946 8	Hereford United	0–0	Colchester United	Hereford
		Report		Stadium: Edgar Street

19 October 1946 9	Colchester United	6–1	Exeter City Reserves	Colchester
15:00	Cater 10'; Turner 35', 44', 53', 77'; Curry 88'	Report	Lancaster 90'	Stadium: Layer Road; Attendance: 6,445

2 November 1946 10	Bath City	3–3	Colchester United	Bath
	Smith 29'; Hamilton 35'; Merritt 68'	Report	Curry 1'; Hillman 10'; Fenton 43'	Stadium: Twerton Park

9 November 1946 11	Worcester City	3–5	Colchester United	Worcester
	Thomson 60'; Horton; Summers	Report	Turner 13', 55'; Collins	Stadium: St George's Lane

23 November 1946 12	Colchester United	1–3	Gravesend & Northfleet	Colchester
14:30	Collins 9'	Report	Palmer 19'; Crowe 24'; Wakeman 55'	Stadium: Layer Road; Attendance: 5,935

7 December 1946 13	Colchester United	3–2	Chelmsford City	Colchester
14:15	Turner 25'; Cater 50', 54'	Report	Burley 22'; Sergeant 35'	Stadium: Layer Road

25 December 1946 14	Colchester United	0–1	Gillingham	Colchester
11:15		Report	Briggs 73'	Stadium: Layer Road

26 December 1946 15	Gillingham	4–2	Colchester United	Gillingham
11:15	Wilson 5'; Kingsnorth 6'; Akers 44'	Report	Curry	Stadium: Priestfield Stadium; Attendance: 11,000

4 January 1947 16	Colchester United	2–2	Cheltenham Town	Colchester
14:15	Turner 40' (pen.); Curry 43'	Report	Crowe	Stadium: Layer Road

18 January 1947 17	Barry Town	2–1	Colchester United	Barry
	Brown 40', 45'	Report	Curry 85'	Stadium: Jenner Park Stadium

8 February 1947 18	Colchester United	2–0	Barry Town	Colchester
15:00	Turner; Neville	Report		Stadium: Layer Road; Attendance: 2,661

22 February 1947	Colchester United	P–P	Dartford	Colchester
15:00		Report		Stadium: Layer Road

1 March 1947 19	Gravesend & Northfleet	3–0	Colchester United	Northfleet
	Butler; Wakeman; Donnelly	Report		Stadium: Stonebridge Road

15 March 1947	Gloucester City	P–P	Colchester United	Gloucester
		Report		Stadium: Longlevens

23 March 1947 20	Yeovil Town	1–1	Colchester United	Yeovil
	Mitcheson	Report	Curry 20'	Stadium: Huish Athletic Ground

29 March 1947 21	Cheltenham Town	1–4	Colchester United	Cheltenham
	Parris 90' (pen.)	Report	Turner 1', 10'; T Smith	Stadium: Whaddon Road

5 April 1947 22	Guildford City	2–1	Colchester United	Guildford
	Roberts 20' (pen.), 55'	Report	Turner 35'	Stadium: St Joseph's Road

12 April 1947 23	Colchester United	2–0	Guildford City	Colchester
15:30	Hillman 12'; Cater 16'	Report		Stadium: Layer Road; Attendance: 6,065

19 April 1947 24	Merthyr Tydfil	4–0	Colchester United	Merthyr Tydfil
	Howarth 35'; Hullett 63'	Report		Stadium: Penydarren Park; Attendance: 8,100

26 April 1947 25	Colchester United	3–2	Bath City	Colchester
15:30	Turner 5'> Fenton 27'; Curry 55'	Report	McCulloch 73'; McDonough 77'	Stadium: Layer Road

3 May 1947 26	Colchester United	2–1	Merthyr Tydfil	Colchester
15:30	Hillman; T Smith	Report	Unknown goalscorer	Stadium: Layer Road

10 May 1947 27	Dartford	3–1	Colchester United	Dartford
	Young; Unknown goalscorer	Report	Curry 16'	Stadium: Watling Street; Attendance: 3,000

17 May 1947 28	Bedford Town	2–0	Colchester United	Bedford
	Watson 4'; Bex 8'	Report		Stadium: The Eyrie

24 May 1947 29	Colchester United	4–0	Bedford Town	Colchester
15:30	Turner 47'; Gillespie 68'; Cater	Report		Stadium: Layer Road

26 May 1947 30	Colchester United	2–1	Dartford	Colchester
15:30	Biggs 10'; Curry 16'	Report	Viles	Stadium: Layer Road

31 May 1947 31	Gloucester City	2–5	Colchester United	Gloucester
	Stow 20'; Grace	Report	Biggs 30'; Turner; Curry; Kettle	Stadium: Longlevens

=== Southern League Cup ===
26 September 1946 1	Colchester United	2–4	Chelmsford City	Colchester
	Turner 70'	Report	Burley 71', 72'; Foreman 74'; Sergeant	Stadium: Layer Road

26 October 1946 2	Bedford Town	0–5	Colchester United	Bedford
		Report	Collins 32', 35'; Cater 41'; Curry 44'; Hutchings 65'	Stadium: The Eyrie

12 December 1946 3	Colchester United	3–2	Millwall Reserves	Colchester
	Neville 37'; Cater 44'; Turner 55'	Report	Anderson 21', 80'	Stadium: Layer Road

11 January 1947 4	Chelmsford City	1–4	Colchester United	Chelmsford
	Duncan 44'	Report	Hillman 14', 36'; Hodgson 25', 37'	Stadium: New Writtle Street; Attendance: 8,000

25 January 1947 5	Colchester United	2–1	Bedford Town	Colchester
14:30	Hillman 49'; Curry 50'	Report	Filby 38'	Stadium: Layer Road

17 February 1947 6	Millwall Reserves	1–1	Colchester United	Millwall
	Sutcliffe 47'	Report	Curry 35'	Stadium: The Den

7 June 1947 Semi-final	Gillingham	3–2	Colchester United	Gillingham
	Piper 38'; Briggs 53'; Russell 82'	Report	Cater 66'; Curry 88'	Stadium: Priestfield Stadium

=== FA Cup ===
16 November 1946 4th qualifying round	Colchester United	5–1	Gothic	Colchester
14:30	Cant 10', 88'; Curry 12'; Cater 40'; Hillman 75'	Report	Niblett 69'	Stadium: Layer Road; Attendance: 6,787

30 November 1946 1st round	Reading	5–0	Colchester United	Reading
	Edelston 10', 63'; McPhee 33'; Chitty 40'; Barney 66'	Report		Stadium: Elm Park; Attendance: 13,381

== Squad statistics ==
=== Appearances and goals ===
No.	Pos	Nat	Player	Total		Southern League		Southern League Cup		FA Cup	
No.	Pos	Nat	Player	Apps	Goals	Apps	Goals	Apps	Goals	Apps	Goals
	GK	(England) ENG	Peter Chiswick	15	0	11	0	2	0	2	0
	GK		John Jelly	2	0	1	0	1	0	0	0
	GK	(England) ENG	Harry Wright	23	0	19	0	4	0	0	0
	DF	(Wales) WAL	Bill Bower	39	0	30	0	7	0	2	0
	DF		Bob Harding	11	0	8	0	1	0	2	0
	DF	(England) ENG	Digger Kettle	16	1	13	1	3	0	0	0
	DF	(England) ENG	Albert Page	12	0	11	0	1	0	0	0
	DF	(England) ENG	Albert Walker	36	0	27	0	7	0	2	0
	MF	(England) ENG	Arthur Biggs	4	2	4	2	0	0	0	0
	MF	(England) ENG	Ted Fenton	36	2	27	2	7	0	2	0
	MF	(England) ENG	John Leah	1	0	0	0	1	0	0	0
	MF	(England) ENG	Frank Stamper	2	0	2	0	0	0	0	0
	FW	(England) ENG	Dennis Cant	6	5	5	3	0	0	1	2
	FW	(England) ENG	Len Cater	39	13	30	9	7	3	2	1
	FW	(England) ENG	Bob Curry	39	19	30	14	7	4	2	1
	FW	(England) ENG	Ian Gillespie	5	1	4	1	1	0	0	0
	FW	(England) ENG	Dennis Hillman	34	7	25	3	7	3	2	1
	FW		Bob Hodgson	12	3	8	1	4	2	0	0
	FW	(England) ENG	Bob Hutchings	30	1	22	0	6	1	2	0
	FW		Bob Neville	7	2	5	1	2	1	0	0
	FW	(Scotland) SCO	Alan Ross	3	0	3	0	0	0	0	0
	FW	(England) ENG	Trevor Smith	8	2	8	2	0	0	0	0
	FW	(England) ENG	Arthur Turner	32	24	25	21	6	3	1	0
Players who appeared for Colchester who left during the season
	DF	(England) ENG	Syd Fieldus	1	0	1	0	0	0	0	0
	DF	(Northern Ireland) NIR	Paddy Shiels	4	0	4	0	0	0	0	0
	DF		Don Swift	3	0	2	0	1	0	0	0
	FW	(England) ENG	Wilf Bott	2	0	2	0	0	0	0	0
	FW	(England) ENG	Bob Collins	10	5	7	3	1	2	2	0
	FW	(England) ENG	Jack Finch	3	0	3	0	0	0	0	0
	FW		Stan Gibbs	1	0	1	0	0	0	0	0
	FW	(England) ENG	Bill Jeffries	1	0	0	0	1	0	0	0
	FW	(Scotland) SCO	Sid Smith	1	0	1	0	0	0	0	0
	FW	(Scotland) SCO	Alex Stewart	1	1	1	1	0	0	0	0
	FW	(Scotland) SCO	Tom Tobin	1	0	1	0	0	0	0	0

=== Goalscorers ===
Place	Nationality	Position	Name	Southern League	Southern League Cup	FA Cup	Total
1	(England)	CF	Arthur Turner	21	3	0	24
2	(England)	IF	Bob Curry	14	4	1	19
3	(England)	CF	Len Cater	9	3	1	13
4	(England)	WG	Dennis Hillman	3	3	1	7
5	(England)	CF	Dennis Cant	3	0	2	5
5	(England)	OL	Bob Collins	3	2	0	5
7		CF	Bob Hodgson	1	2	0	3
8	(England)	WH	Arthur Biggs	2	0	0	2
8	(England)	WH	Ted Fenton	2	0	0	2
8		OL	Bob Neville	1	1	0	2
8	(England)	IF	Trevor Smith	2	0	0	2
12	(England)	IF	Ian Gillespie	1	0	0	1
12	(England)	LW	Bob Hutchings	0	1	0	1
12	(England)	FB	Digger Kettle	1	0	0	1
12	(Scotland)	CF	Alex Stewart	1	0	0	1
			Own goals	1	0	0	1
			TOTALS	65	19	5	89

=== Disciplinary record ===
Nationality	Position	Name	Southern League		Southern League Cup		FA Cup		Total	
Nationality	Position	Name	Booked	Sent off (straight red)	Booked	Sent off (straight red)	Booked	Sent off (straight red)	Booked	Sent off (straight red)
(England)	WH	Ted Fenton	1	0	0	0	1	0	2	0
		TOTALS	1	0	0	0	1	0	2	0

=== Captains ===
Number of games played as team captain.

Place	Nationality	Position	Player	Southern League	Southern League Cup	FA Cup	Total
1	(Wales)	FB	Bill Bower	30	6	2	38
			Not recorded	1	1	0	2
			TOTALS	31	7	2	40

=== Clean sheets ===
Number of games goalkeepers kept a clean sheet.

Place	Nationality	Player	Southern League	Southern League Cup	FA Cup	Total
1	(England)	Harry Wright	3	0	0	3
2	(England)	Peter Chiswick	1	1	0	2
		TOTALS	4	1	0	5

=== Player debuts ===
Players making their first-team Colchester United debut in a fully competitive match.

Position	Nationality	Player	Date	Opponent	Ground	Notes
GK	(England)	Harry Wright	31 August 1946	Gloucester City	Layer Road	
WH	(England)	Ted Fenton	31 August 1946	Gloucester City	Layer Road	
CF	(England)	Len Cater	31 August 1946	Gloucester City	Layer Road	
IF	(England)	Bob Curry	31 August 1946	Gloucester City	Layer Road	
WG	(England)	Jack Finch	31 August 1946	Gloucester City	Layer Road	
OL	(Scotland)	Alan Ross	31 August 1946	Gloucester City	Layer Road	
LW	(Scotland)	Sid Smith	31 August 1946	Gloucester City	Layer Road	
CF	(Scotland)	Alex Stewart	31 August 1946	Gloucester City	Layer Road	
GK		John Jelly	4 September 1946	Chelmsford City	New Writtle Street	
WG	(England)	Wilf Bott	4 September 1946	Chelmsford City	New Writtle Street	
CF	(England)	Dennis Cant	4 September 1946	Chelmsford City	New Writtle Street	
CB		Bob Harding	14 September 1946	Hereford United	Layer Road	
FB	(England)	Albert Walker	14 September 1946	Hereford United	Layer Road	
CF	(England)	Arthur Turner	19 September 1946	Millwall Reserves	Layer Road	
RH	(England)	John Leah	26 September 1946	Chelmsford City	Layer Road	
WG	(England)	Dennis Hillman	26 September 1946	Chelmsford City	Layer Road	
GK	(England)	Peter Chiswick	28 September 1946	Worcester City	Layer Road	
DF		Don Swift	7 December 1946	Chelmsford City	Layer Road	
OL		Bob Neville	7 December 1946	Chelmsford City	Layer Road	
FB	(England)	Digger Kettle	26 December 1946	Gillingham	Priestfield Stadium	
IR		Stan Gibbs	1 March 1947	Gravesend & Northfleet	Stonebridge Road	
IF	(England)	Trevor Smith	23 March 1947	Yeovil Town	Huish Athletic Ground	
CB	(England)	Albert Page	29 March 1947	Cheltenham Town	Whaddon Road	
WH/IR	(England)	Frank Stamper	19 April 1947	Merthyr Tydfil	Penydarren Park	
WH	(England)	Arthur Biggs	17 May 1947	Bedford Town	The Eyrie	
IF	(England)	Ian Gillespie	17 May 1947	Bedford Town	The Eyrie	
FW	(England)	Bill Jeffries	7 June 1947	Gillingham	Priestfield Stadium	

== See also ==
- List of Colchester United F.C. seasons
