= 1947–48 Colchester United F.C. season =

Colchester United
1947–48 season
- Chairman: Bill Allen
- Manager: Ted Fenton (until June 1948)
- Stadium: Layer Road
- Southern League: 4th
- FA Cup: 5th round (eliminated by Blackpool)
- Southern League Cup: Runners-up
- Top goalscorer: League: Arthur Turner (25); All: Bob Curry (30)
- Highest home attendance: 17,048 v Bradford Park Avenue, 24 January 1948
- Lowest home attendance: 4,665 v Bedford Town, 20 December 1947
- Average home league attendance: 9,231
- Biggest win: 8–0 v Gloucester City, 6 September 1947
- Biggest defeat: 0–5 v Blackpool, 7 February 1948
Home colours

The 1947–48 season was Colchester United's sixth season in their history and their sixth in the Southern League. Alongside competing in the Southern League, the club also participated in the FA Cup and Southern League Cup. The season was most notable for Colchester's run in the FA Cup, where they defeated three Football League clubs as they progressed to the fifth round, before being beaten 5–0 by First Division side Blackpool. They finished in 4th position in the Southern League, and while they ended as runners-up in the Southern League Cup, the final wasn't held until April 1949 due to fixture congestion.

== Season overview ==
Manager Ted Fenton's first-team squad had featured 28 part-time professionals during the 1946–47 season, but this number was reduced to 17 for the 1947–48 campaign, while signings such as Bob Allen and Harry Bearryman, and the emergence of Vic Keeble bolstered the ranks.

The 1947–48 season was most memorable for Colchester's magnificent run in the FA Cup. The competition began with a 3–2 win over league rivals Chelmsford City in the fourth qualifying round in front of a Layer Road crowd of 10,396. It was the second year in succession that the U's would reach the first round proper of the cup, having been defeated 5–0 by Reading at the same stage twelve months earlier. The result on this occasion would go in Colchester's favour, with 8,574 fans watching their 2–1 win against Banbury Spencer.

Third Division North side Wrexham visited Layer Road for the second round match, with the visitors falling to a 1–0 defeat courtesy of a Bob Curry goal in front of a 10,642 crowd. With the U's into the third round, it would be the club that inspired Colchester's own strip, Huddersfield Town of the First Division, that would taste defeat at the hands of the non–Leaguers. With the national press making Colchester's Cup progress headline news, Fenton welcomed the extra publicity. He watched Huddersfield play a number of times prior to the tie, declaring to the media that he had come up with a plan to beat them. The plan became known as "the F–plan". Both teams changed colours for the game, with visiting Huddersfield in red, and Colchester in blue. The First Division side struggled to adapt to the cramped surroundings of Layer Road, and when Bob Allen's free kick was parried away by the goalkeeper, U's captain Bob Curry scored from the rebound. This was the first time that a non–League side had beaten a First Division club, with a record crowd of 16,005 witnessing that game.

With the increased interest in Colchester's cup heroics, the crowd from the previous game could have trebled had Layer Road been able to accommodate the fans. The club welcomed Second Division Bradford Park Avenue to the ground on 24 January 1948, with a crowd of 17,048 in attendance. With their opponents wary of Colchester's reputation, Bradford would take the lead, only for Curry to net a brace before being pegged back to 2–2. Fred Cutting went on to score the winner to send the club into the fifth round.

Stanley Matthews' First Division Blackpool were drawn as hosts to Fenton's side. With the effects of the war still evident, fuel rationing meant that the 52 scheduled coaches for the journey to Bloomfield Road were cancelled just 36 hours ahead of the game, meaning that only 12 coaches could travel, and the remainder of the away fans would have to travel by train to the North West. This meant that they would arrive in Blackpool in the early hours the morning of the match, but this did not deter the supporters, with the West Lancashire Post reporting:

The peace of Blackpool was shattered at dawn today by thousands of Colchester fans, waving rattles, ringing bells, blowing trumpets and shouting "Up the U's". Not since pre-war Illumination weekends has there been such an invasion as stormed our streets from 4 o'clock this morning.

Despite the good natured support, the home team defeated the U's by 5–0 in front of a sell-out 29,500 Bloomfield Road crowd. However, the FA Cup success had an effect on Colchester's league form, with the club eventually finishing fourth, nine points adrift of champions Merthyr Tydfil. They also reached the final of the Southern League Cup, but ran out of time to play the final during the season owing to fixture congestion.

Following all of the attention garnered from the Cup run, Fenton was much sought after, and was offered the role of assistant manager at his old club West Ham United during the summer of 1948, a role which he could not refuse.

== Players ==
As of match played 1 May 1948.

Name	Position	Nationality	Place of birth	Date of birth	Apps	Goals	Signed from	Date signed	Fee
Goalkeepers
John Le Mare	GK	(England)	Ipswich	15 April 1926 (aged 21)	0	0	(England) Woodbridge Town	November 1947	Free transfer
Ernest Setchell	GK	(England)	Hammersmith	9 March 1928 (aged 19)	0	0	(England) Dartford	5 June 1947	Free transfer
Harry Wright	GK	(England)	Tottenham	3 June 1909 (aged 37)	23	0	(England) Chelmsford City	11 July 1946	Free transfer
Defenders
Bill Bower	FB	(Wales)	Wrexham	17 November 1911 (aged 35)	69	1	(England) Millwall	28 November 1945	Free transfer
Aubrey Darmody	FB	(Wales)	Swansea	17 March 1921 (aged 26)	0	0	(England) Norwich City	28 July 1947	Free transfer
Digger Kettle	FB	(England)	Colchester	3 June 1922 (aged 24)	16	1	(England) Arclight Sports	September 1946	Free transfer
Albert Page	CB	(England)	Walthamstow	18 March 1916 (aged 31)	12	0	(England) Tottenham Hotspur	26 March 1947	Free transfer
Albert Walker	FB	(England)	Little Lever	4 February 1910 (aged 37)	36	0	(England) Doncaster Rovers	30 May 1946	Free transfer
Midfielders
Harry Bearryman	WH	(England)	Wandsworth	26 September 1924 (aged 22)	0	0	(England) Chelsea	4 July 1947	Free transfer
Arthur Biggs	WH	(England)	Wootton	26 May 1915 (aged 32)	4	2	(England) Bedford Town	7 May 1947	Free transfer
Ted Fenton	WH	(England)	Forest Gate	7 November 1914 (aged 32)	36	2	(England) West Ham United	15 April 1946	Free transfer
Frank Stamper	WH/IR	(England)	Hartlepool	22 February 1926 (aged 21)	2	0	Colchester Garrison Army Fire Fighting Centre	3 March 1947	Free transfer
Forwards
Bob Allen	WG	(England)	Bromley-by-Bow	11 October 1916 (aged 30)	0	0	(England) Gainsborough Trinity	13 June 1946	Free transfer
Andy Brown	IF	(Scotland)	Coatbridge	20 February 1915 (aged 32)	0	0	(England) Torquay United	17 June 1947	Free transfer
Len Cater	CF	(England)	Colchester		39	13	Free agent	6 June 1946	Free transfer
Bob Curry	IF	(England)	Gateshead	2 November 1918 (aged 28)	39	19	(England) Northampton Town	13 June 1947	Free transfer
Fred Cutting	IF	(England)	North Walsham	4 December 1921 (aged 25)	0	0	(England) Norwich City	6 December 1947 (Note: Date of signing refers to the date of the player's first game for the club)	Free transfer
Ian Gillespie	IF	(England)	Plymouth	6 May 1913 (aged 34)	5	1	(England) Ipswich Town	15 May 1947	Free transfer
Dennis Hillman	WG	(England)	Southend-on-Sea	27 November 1918 (aged 28)	34	7	(England) Brighton & Hove Albion	21 September 1946	Free transfer
Vic Keeble	CF	(England)	Colchester	25 June 1930 (aged 16)	0	0	(England) King George Youth Club	23 May 1947	£10
Bob Neville	OL				7	2	(England) Rowhedge	October 1946	Free transfer
Ray Townrow	IR	(England)	West Ham		0	0	(England) Wolverhampton Wanderers	2 January 1948	Free transfer
Arthur Turner	CF	(England)	Poplar	22 January 1921 (aged 26)	32	24	(England) Charlton Athletic	September 1946	Free transfer

== Transfers ==
=== In ===
Date	Position	Nationality	Name	From	Fee	Ref.
23 May 1947	CF	(England)	Vic Keeble	(England) King George Youth Club	£10	
5 June 1947	GK	(England)	Ernest Setchell	(England) Dartford	Free transfer	
13 June 1947	WG	(England)	Bob Allen	(England) Northampton Town	Free transfer	
17 June 1947	IF	(Scotland)	Andy Brown	(England) Torquay United	Free transfer	
26 June 1947	CB	(England)	Frank Rist	(England) Charlton Athletic	Free transfer	
4 July 1947	WH	(England)	Harry Bearryman	(England) Chelsea	Free transfer	
28 July 1947	FB	(Wales)	Aubrey Darmody	(England) Norwich City	Free transfer	
13 September 1947	WG	(England)	Taffy Williams	(England) Northampton Town	Free transfer	
November 1947	GK	(England)	John Le Mare	(England) Woodbridge Town	Free transfer	
6 December 1947	IF	(England)	Fred Cutting	(England) Norwich City	Free transfer	(Note: Date of signing refers to the date of the player's first game for the club)
2 January 1948	IR	(England)	Ray Townrow	(England) Wolverhampton Wanderers	Free transfer	

- Total spending: ▼ ~ £10

=== Out ===
Date	Position	Nationality	Name	To	Fee	Ref.
End of season	LW	(England)	Bob Hutchings	Free agent	Released	
End of season	IF	(England)	Trevor Smith	(England) Watford	Free transfer	
July 1947	GK	(England)	Peter Chiswick	(England) West Ham United	Free transfer	
June 1947	OL	(Scotland)	Alan Ross	(England) Brantham Athletic	Player-coach	
September 1947	CB		Bob Harding	Free agent	Released	
9 October 1947	CF	(England)	Dennis Cant	(England) Clacton Town	Free transfer	
December 1947	GK		John Jelly	(England) Colchester Casuals	Free transfer	
1 December 1947	CF		Bob Hodgson	(England) Brightlingsea United	Manager	
27 December 1947	RH	(England)	John Leah	Free agent	Retired	(Note: Date of departure refers to the date of the player's final game for the club)
17 March 1948	WG	(England)	Taffy Williams	(England) Chingford Town	Free transfer	
21 April 1948	CB	(England)	Frank Rist	(England) Tonbridge Angels	Free transfer	

== Match details ==
=== Friendlies ===
23 August 1947 Friendly	Colchester United	3–2	(Netherlands) PEC Zwolle	Colchester
	Turner (pen.); Allen; Curry	Report	Doorneweert; Maaiste	Stadium: Layer Road; Attendance: 4,200

20 September 1947 Friendly	Colchester United	1–1	Chelsea Reserves	Colchester
15:15	Unknown goalscorer	Report	Unknown goalscorer	Stadium: Layer Road

25 October 1947 Friendly	Colchester United	6–0	Charlton AthleticReserves	Colchester
	Turner; Curry; Hillman; Cater	Report		Stadium: Layer Road; Attendance: 4,004

30 April 1948 Friendly	Arsenal	3–0	Colchester United	Highbury
18:00	Rooke 35', 86'; Roper 66'	Report		Stadium: Arsenal Stadium; Attendance: 35,000

=== Southern League ===
==== League table ====
Pos	Team	Pld	W	D	L	GF	GA	GR	Pts
2	Gillingham	34	21	5	8	81	43	1.884	47
3	Worcester City	34	21	3	10	74	45	1.644	45
4	Colchester United	34	17	10	7	88	41	2.146	44
5	Hereford United	34	16	10	8	77	53	1.453	42
6	Lovells Athletic	34	17	6	11	74	50	1.480	40

Source: rsssf.com
Rules for classification: 1) points; 2) goal ratio.

==== Matches ====
30 August 1947 1	Bedford Town	1–5	Colchester United	Bedford
	Reid	Report	Keeble 52', 55'; Cater 62'	Stadium: The Eyrie

6 September 1947 2	Colchester United	8–0	Gloucester City	Colchester
	Hillman 3', 68'; Turner 67'; Biggs; Curry; Cater	Report		Stadium: Layer Road; Attendance: 11,419

13 September 1947 3	Hereford United	0–0	Colchester United	Hereford
		Report		Stadium: Edgar Street

27 September 1947 4	Yeovil Town	2–0	Colchester United	Yeovil
	Swinfen 10', 30'	Report		Stadium: Huish Athletic Ground

11 October 1947 5	Colchester United	4–2	Bath City	Colchester
15:00	Turner 23', 24'; Owens (o.g.); Hillman	Report	Merritt	Stadium: Layer Road

18 October 1947 6	Colchester United	1–3	Worcester City	Colchester
	Turner	Report	Godfrey; Jackman; Medd	Stadium: Layer Road; Attendance: 6,798

1 November 1947 7	Colchester United	5–0	Torquay United Reserves	Colchester
14:45	Turner; Curry; Fenton	Report		Stadium: Layer Road; Attendance: 6,330

8 November 1947 8	Gravesend & Northfleet	1–2	Colchester United	Northfleet
	Wakeman	Report	Cater; Fenton	Stadium: Stonebridge Road

22 November 1947 9	Colchester United	1–1	Merthyr Tydfil	Colchester
14:45	Turner (pen.)	Report	Carr	Stadium: Layer Road

6 December 1947 10	Barry Town	2–5	Colchester United	Barry
	Allen 42' (o.g.); Brown	Report	Curry 35'; Keeble 43'; Cutting	Stadium: Jenner Park Stadium

20 December 1947 11	Colchester United	3–0	Bedford Town	Colchester
14:15	Curry 8'; Turner 10'	Report		Stadium: Layer Road; Attendance: 4,665

25 December 1947 12	Colchester United	3–0	Gillingham	Colchester
11:00	Turner 8'; Curry 30'	Report		Stadium: Layer Road; Attendance: 7,207

26 December 1947 13	Gillingham	2–2	Colchester United	Gillingham
	Boswell 25'; Warsop 80'	Report	Turner 18'; Curry 30'	Stadium: Priestfield Stadium; Attendance: 12,500

27 December 1947 14	Cheltenham Town	5–2	Colchester United	Cheltenham
	Page 25' (o.g.); Crowe 26'; Le Mare 50' (o.g.); Goring; Green	Report	Keeble 12'; Curry 55'	Stadium: Whaddon Road

3 January 1948 15	Colchester United	1–2	Cheltenham Town	Colchester
14:15	Fenton 19'	Report	Goring	Stadium: Layer Road; Attendance: 6,508

31 January 1948 16	Torquay United Reserves	1–1	Colchester United	Torquay
	Griffiths 30'	Report	Cutting 22'	Stadium: Plainmoor; Attendance: 4,221

14 February 1948 17	Colchester United	6–0	Exeter City Reserves	Colchester
	Rowe (o.g.); Turner; Curry; Cutting	Report		Stadium: Layer Road

21 February 1948 18	Merthyr Tydfil	1–1	Colchester United	Merthyr Tydfil
	Unknown goalscorer	Report	Cutting	Stadium: Penydarren Park

28 February 1948 19	Lovell's Athletic	2–2	Colchester United	Newport
	Edmunds (pen.); Wood	Report	Townrow	Stadium: Rexville; Attendance: 7,000

6 March 1948 20	Worcester City	2–4	Colchester United	Worcester
	White 84'; Jackman	Report	Cater 13'; Hillman 30'; Woolacott (o.g.); Cutting	Stadium: St George's Lane

13 March 1948 21	Bath City	1–1	Colchester United	Bath
	Marshall 25' (pen.)	Report	Brown	Stadium: Twerton Park

17 March 1948 22	Dartford	1–1	Colchester United	Dartford
	Parker 44'	Report	Bearryman 79'	Stadium: Watling Street; Attendance: 5,000

20 March 1948 23	Colchester United	2–0	Chelmsford City	Colchester
	Cutting	Report		Stadium: Layer Road

26 March 1948 24	Colchester United	1–1	Guildford City	Colchester
	Bearryman 43'	Report	Sperrin 75'	Stadium: Layer Road; Attendance: 10,440

27 March 1948 25	Colchester United	6–1	Gravesend & Northfleet	Colchester
	Cutting 3', 23'; Turner 5'; Curry 25', 25'; Keeble 30'	Report	Elliott 68'	Stadium: Layer Road

29 March 1948 26	Guildford City	1–2	Colchester United	Guildford
	Sutton 47'	Report	Turner 14'; Cutting 65'	Stadium: St Joseph's Road; Attendance: 8,400

1 April 1948 27	Colchester United	6–1	Dartford	Colchester
	Turner; Keeble	Report	Unknown goalscorer	Stadium: Layer Road

3 April 1948 28	Colchester United	4–0	Barry Town	Colchester
	Turner; Curry	Report		Stadium: Layer Road

10 April 1948 29	Colchester United	1–1	Hereford United	Colchester
	Fenton 80'	Report	Unknown goalscorer 44' (pen.)	Stadium: Layer Road

14 April 1948 30	Exeter City Reserves	2–1	Colchester United	Exeter
	Smart 5', 23'	Report	Townrow	Stadium: St James Park

17 April 1948 31	Gloucester City	1–3	Colchester United	Gloucester
	Holland	Report	Turner; Cutting; Cater	Stadium: Longlevens; Attendance: 2,250

21 April 1948 32	Chelmsford City	2–1	Colchester United	Chelmsford
	Hurst 6'; Foreman 54'	Report	Curry 10'	Stadium: New Writtle Street

24 April 1948 33	Colchester United	3–0	Yeovil Town	Colchester
	Brown; Turner; Curry	Report		Stadium: Layer Road

1 May 1948 34	Colchester United	0–2	Lovell's Athletic	Colchester
		Report	Holland	Stadium: Layer Road; Attendance: 6,582

=== Southern League Cup ===
11 September 1947 1	Colchester United	3–0	Chelmsford City	Colchester
18:00	Hillman 7'; Gillespie; Cater	Report		Stadium: Layer Road; Attendance: 11,419

24 September 1947 2	Chelmsford City	1–2	Colchester United	Chelmsford
	Foreman 58'	Report	Biggs 50'; Cater 72'	Stadium: New Writtle Street; Attendance: 8,000

16 October 1947 3	Bedford Town	3–3	Colchester United	Bedford
	Sayers 1'; Campbell; Wilmott	Report	Rist 78' (pen.); Curry 90'; Fenton	Stadium: The Eyrie

17 January 1948 4	Colchester United	4–0	Bedford Town	Colchester
	Keeble 20'; Bearryman 28'; Cutting 45'; Cater 60'	Report		Stadium: Layer Road

4 March 1948 5	Colchester United	7–1	Cheltenham Town	Colchester
	Curry; Cutting; Bearryman; Cater	Report	Unknown goalscorer	Stadium: Layer Road

10 March 1948 6	Cheltenham Town	0–4	Colchester United	Cheltenham
		Report	Turner 30'; Cater 40', 89'; Townrow 85'	Stadium: Whaddon Road

19 April 1948 Semi-final	Gravesend & Northfleet	1–1	Colchester United	Northfleet
	Wipfler 30'	Report	Bearryman	Stadium: Stonebridge Road

26 April 1948 Semi-final replay	Colchester United	3–1	Gravesend & Northfleet	Colchester
	Curry; Townrow	Report	Unknown goalscorer	Stadium: Layer Road

=== FA Cup ===
15 November 1947 4th qualifying round	Colchester United	3–1	Chelmsford City	Colchester
14:15	Turner 11'; Curry	Report	McClelland	Stadium: Layer Road; Attendance: 10,396

29 November 1947 1st round	Colchester United	2–1	Banbury Spencer	Colchester
14:00	Curry 80'; Brown	Report	North 16'	Stadium: Layer Road; Attendance: 8,574

13 December 1947 2nd round	Colchester United	1–0	Wrexham	Colchester
14:00	Curry 72'	Report		Stadium: Layer Road; Attendance: 10,642; Referee: Phillips

10 January 1948 3rd round	Colchester United	1–0	Huddersfield Town	Colchester
14:15	Curry 70'	Report		Stadium: Layer Road; Attendance: 16,005; Referee: Reader

24 January 1948 4th round	Colchester United	3–2	Bradford Park Avenue	Colchester
14:45	Curry 16', 19'; Cutting 47'	Report	Elliott 13'; Ainsley 28'	Stadium: Layer Road; Attendance: 17,048

7 February 1948 5th round	Blackpool	5–0	Colchester United	Blackpool
	McIntosh; Mortensen; Munro	Report		Stadium: Bloomfield Road; Attendance: 29,500

== Squad statistics ==
=== Appearances and goals ===
No.	Pos	Nat	Player	Total		Southern League		Southern League Cup		FA Cup	
No.	Pos	Nat	Player	Apps	Goals	Apps	Goals	Apps	Goals	Apps	Goals
	GK	(England) ENG	John Le Mare	5	0	4	0	1	0	0	0
	GK	(England) ENG	Ernest Setchell	2	0	2	0	0	0	0	0
	GK	(England) ENG	Harry Wright	41	0	28	0	7	0	6	0
	DF	(Wales) WAL	Bill Bower	4	0	3	0	1	0	0	0
	DF	(Wales) WAL	Aubrey Darmody	3	0	3	0	0	0	0	0
	DF	(England) ENG	Digger Kettle	44	0	31	0	7	0	6	0
	DF	(England) ENG	Albert Page	8	0	6	0	2	0	0	0
	DF	(England) ENG	Albert Walker	3	0	2	0	1	0	0	0
	MF	(England) ENG	Harry Bearryman	46	5	32	2	8	3	6	0
	MF	(England) ENG	Arthur Biggs	10	2	8	1	1	1	1	0
	MF	(England) ENG	Ted Fenton	30	5	20	4	4	1	6	0
	MF	(England) ENG	Frank Stamper	6	0	4	0	2	0	0	0
	FW	(England) ENG	Bob Allen	44	0	31	0	7	0	6	0
	FW	(Scotland) SCO	Andy Brown	42	3	28	2	8	0	6	1
	FW	(England) ENG	Len Cater	37	13	26	6	5	7	6	0
	FW	(England) ENG	Bob Curry	44	30	31	17	7	6	6	7
	FW	(England) ENG	Fred Cutting	31	15	23	12	3	2	5	1
	FW	(England) ENG	Dennis Hillman	38	6	27	5	6	1	5	0
	FW	(England) ENG	Vic Keeble	15	9	12	8	3	1	0	0
	FW	(England) ENG	Ray Townrow	11	5	8	3	3	2	0	0
	FW	(England) ENG	Arthur Turner	43	27	30	25	7	1	6	1
Players who appeared for Colchester who left during the season
	DF	(England) ENG	Frank Rist	13	1	10	0	3	1	0	0
	MF	(England) ENG	John Leah	1	0	1	0	0	0	0	0
	FW	(England) ENG	Ian Gillespie	1	1	0	0	1	1	0	0
	FW	(England) ENG	Taffy Williams	6	0	4	0	1	0	1	0

=== Goalscorers ===
Place	Nationality	Position	Name	Southern League	Southern League Cup	FA Cup	Total
1	(England)	IF	Bob Curry	17	6	7	30
2	(England)	CF	Arthur Turner	25	1	1	27
3	(England)	IF	Fred Cutting	12	2	1	15
4	(England)	CF	Len Cater	6	7	0	13
5	(England)	CF	Vic Keeble	8	1	0	9
6	(England)	WG	Dennis Hillman	5	1	0	6
7	(England)	WH	Harry Bearryman	2	3	0	5
7	(England)	WH	Ted Fenton	4	1	0	5
7	(England)	IR	Ray Townrow	3	2	0	5
10	(Scotland)	IF	Andy Brown	2	0	1	3
11	(England)	WH	Arthur Biggs	1	1	0	2
12	(England)	IF	Ian Gillespie	0	1	0	1
12	(England)	CB	Frank Rist	0	1	0	1
			Own goals	3	0	0	3
			TOTALS	88	27	10	125

=== Captains ===
Number of games played as team captain.

Place	Nationality	Position	Player	Southern League	Southern League Cup	FA Cup	Total
1	(England)	IF	Bob Curry	15	3	3	21
			Not recorded	19	3	5	27
			TOTALS	34	6	8	48

=== Clean sheets ===
Number of games goalkeepers kept a clean sheet.

Place	Nationality	Player	Southern League	Southern League Cup	FA Cup	Total
1	(England)	Harry Wright	7	2	2	11
2	(England)	John Le Mare	1	1	0	2
3	(England)	Ernest Setchell	1	0	0	1
		TOTALS	9	3	2	14

=== Player debuts ===
Players making their first-team Colchester United debut in a fully competitive match.

Position	Nationality	Player	Date	Opponent	Ground	Notes
WH	(England)	Harry Bearryman	30 August 1947	Bedford Town	The Eyrie	
CB	(England)	Frank Rist	30 August 1947	Bedford Town	The Eyrie	
WG	(England)	Bob Allen	30 August 1947	Bedford Town	The Eyrie	
IF	(Scotland)	Andy Brown	30 August 1947	Bedford Town	The Eyrie	
CF	(England)	Vic Keeble	30 August 1947	Bedford Town	The Eyrie	
WG	(England)	Taffy Williams	27 September 1947	Yeovil Town	Huish Athletic Ground	
IF	(England)	Fred Cutting	29 November 1947	Banbury Spencer	Layer Road	
GK	(England)	John Le Mare	6 December 1947	Barry Town	Jenner Park Stadium	
IR	(England)	Ray Townrow	17 January 1948	Bedford Town	Layer Road	
FB	(Wales)	Aubrey Darmody	29 March 1948	Guildford City	St Joseph's Road	
GK	(England)	Ernest Setchell	24 April 1948	Yeovil Town	Layer Road	

== See also ==
- List of Colchester United F.C. seasons
