= List of Colchester United F.C. managers =

Colchester United Football Club is an English football club based in Colchester, Essex. Formed in 1937 from the remnants of the former Colchester Town football club, United competed in the Southern Football League from their foundation until 1950, when they were elected to the Football League.

Ted Davis, a former Huddersfield Town goalkeeper and Bath City manager was appointed by Colchester United's board of directors to take charge of team affairs in 1937. Davis' Huddersfield contacts allowed the newly-formed club's players to be kitted in the same blue and white strip as his former team. In the 1939–40 season, after only three Southern League games, the Second World War was declared and the club closed down until 1945.

Former Colchester Town player Syd Fieldus along with a couple of the directors kept Colchester United alive but dormant during the war years. Fieldus was appointed secretary-manager for 1945–46. He liaised with Major Dai Rees and forged a strong relationship with the Garrison. Since United had only four contracted players, the team was complemented by a number servicemen. Fieldus urged the board to appoint a full-time manager for the 1946–47 season and Ted Fenton, formerly of West Ham United was hired. Fenton had turned out for Colchester Town in the early 1930s as a teenager. Following a successful FA Cup run in 1947–48, he rejoined West Ham as assistant manager in the summer of 1948.

Ex-England international centre-half Jimmy Allen took over in 1948 and led Colchester to Football League election in the summer of 1950.

Allen resigned on 2 May 1953 and Jack Butler, a former Arsenal player, was appointed his replacement. Butler had been coaching in Belgium and had been in charge of the Belgium national team between 1935 and 1940, leading them to the 1938 FIFA World Cup Finals. He resigned in January 1955 and the board chose Benny Fenton to be player-manager. He spent eight years with the club, suffering relegation for the first time in the clubs history in 1961, only to return to the Third Division at the first attempt. Fenton left to take over at Orient in November 1963.

Fenton's replacement was former Stoke City and England centre-half Neil Franklin. His spell in charge saw Colchester bounce between the Third and Fourth Divisions, and he was sacked following his second relegation to Division Four.

Colchester's new manager was Dick Graham, who adopted a policy of employing older, more experienced players. Graham led his U's side to arguable their most famous victory; a 3–2 FA Cup win against First Division Leeds United in the fifth round in 1971.

When Colchester United held its annual general meeting in September 1972, Graham was so incensed of the questioning of his team and tactics by a shareholder that he tendered his resignation. A month later, Jim Smith was appointed manager, who had led Boston United to the Northern Premier League title. Smith later left to join Second Division side Blackburn Rovers in the summer of 1975. His coach Bobby Roberts was appointed manager.

Under Roberts' stewardship, Colchester were relegated from the Third Division in his first season in charge, but made another immediate return the following season. Following another relegation in 1981, and a drop in form in the Fourth Division, Roberts was asked to resign in April 1982. He refused and was sacked a month later.

Former Ipswich Town centre-half Allan Hunter accepted a player-manager role and introduced former Ipswich coach Cyril Lea as his assistant for 1982–83. On the back of having to give up his own playing career through injury and Colchester player John Lyons' suicide, Hunter resigned in January 1983. Lea took over until the end of the campaign. Four months after becoming caretaker, Lea was appointed full-time. After failing to achieve promotion from the Fourth Division in 1986, Lea was then sacked.

Former Colchester goalkeeper Mike Walker, then coach of the U's reserves, took over as caretaker and went unbeaten in the remaining eight matches of the season. He was appointed full-time, but was sacked in November 1987 by chairman Jonathan Crisp with the club top of Division Four. Crisp claimed Walker had resigned, but an alleged personal matter between the pair was said to have been the spark. Roger Brown took over the team, but his tenure lasted less than a year as he was sacked after Leyton Orient beat Brown's team 8–0.

Former Rangers manager Jock Wallace was tasked with keeping Colchester in the Football League as they finished in 22nd position in 1989, eight points clear of relegation to the Conference. Ill health meant that Wallace had to step down from his role the following season, and former Ipswich and England defender Mick Mills was made the new manager in January 1990. A poor run of form towards the end of the season condemned Colchester to relegation out of the Football League for the first time in 40 years.

Ian Atkins was appointed as the new manager and charged to make an immediate return to the Football League. The U's were playing as a fully professional team, yet finished runners-up to Barnet. Atkins joined Birmingham City as coach at the end of the season and new chairman James Bowdidge appointed Roy McDonough as player-manager. McDonough, who had been Atkins' assistant, led Colchester back to the League football at his first and the club's second attempt, winning the FA Trophy in the process to complete a non-league double.

Following a disappointing 1993–94 season, McDonough was sacked and former Ipswich full-back George Burley was appointed his replacement in July 1994. Burley was later tapped up by Ipswich, who had been refused permission to speak to him and he walked out on fifth-placed Colchester.

Steve Wignall was named as new Colchester manager in January 1995. Under Wignall's management, the U's finished as runners-up in the 1997 Football League Trophy Final and won promotion via the 1998 Football League Third Division play-off final. Wignall quit in 1999 citing that he had taken his team as far as he could and was frustrated at the role agents were playing in transfer deals he was trying to set up.

Steve Whitton, Wignall's assistant, became caretaker before Mick Wadsworth, former Scarborough manager, was appointed, keeping Whitton on as assistant. Wadsworth later resigned, citing travelling distance to work as his main reason for leaving. Whitton was promoted to become manager in August 1999. After losing to Conference side Chester in the FA Cup at Layer Road and a run of seven games without a win he left by mutual consent in January 2003. Assistant Geraint Williams took caretaker charge, before Reading's player-coach Phil Parkinson as appointed as United's new boss. Under Parkinson, the U's reached the 5th round of the FA Cup and later achieved promotion to the Championship. Parkinson, however, resigned on 13 June 2006 to take over at Hull City.

Geraint Williams was charged with the daunting task of leading United in their first season in the Championship. The 10th-placed finish they achieved in the 2006–07 season was the highest in the club's history making them 30th in the entire Football League. Colchester were relegated back to League One in 2008, and following a poor run, United were in the bottom four with a record of 1 League win from 6, as Williams was relieved of his duties. Assistant manager Kit Symons took charge for four games, but on 10 October 2008 former Wycombe manager Paul Lambert was unveiled as Colchester's new manager. He quickly inspired The U's to record their first home victory in a thumping 5–0 win over Carlisle 15 days later. On the first day of the 2009–10 season, United walloped Norwich in a truly sensational 7–1 thrashing at Carrow Road. Norwich approached the Colchester chairman over taking Lambert as their new manager following their sacking of Bryan Gunn. Former Watford boss Aidy Boothroyd was unveiled as successor to Lambert on 3 September 2009.

In the summer of 2010, Boothroyd joined Coventry City as their new manager on a three-year deal after he led the U's to eighth place in League One. Colchester promoted John Ward to be new manager following the departure of Boothroyd, having been his assistant. After two mid-table finishes Ward was sacked after a poor start to the 2012–13 Season, being replaced by his assistant Joe Dunne. Joe Dunne was replaced in 2014 by Tony Humes.

== Managers ==
Statistics are correct as of 13 April 2025.

All first team matches are counted, except wartime matches.

Key
Highlight	Description
Manager name	Highlighted stint as caretaker manager

Name	Nationality	From	To	P	W	D	L	GF	GA	GD	Win %	Honours	Ref
Ted Davis	England	21 July 1937	30 September 1939	127	79	17	31	325	154	171	62.2	1938–39 Southern League champions 1939–40 Southern League Cup winners	
Syd Fieldus	England	1 June 1945	15 April 1946	31	11	7	13	51	70	−19	35.5		
Ted Fenton	England	15 April 1946	31 May 1948	88	48	17	23	214	135	79	54.5		
Jimmy Allen	England	22 June 1948	2 May 1953	249	108	59	82	433	380	53	43.4	1949–50 Southern League runners-up 1949–50 Southern League Cup winners	
Jack Butler	England	16 June 1953	14 January 1955	76	16	19	41	84	135	−51	21.1		
Alf Miller	England	14 January 1955	28 February 1955	5	1	2	2	3	6	−3	20.0		
Benny Fenton	England	28 February 1955	16 November 1963	425	165	106	154	734	732	2	38.8	1961–62 Fourth Division runners-up	
Committee	N/a	16 November 1963	2 December 1963	3	2	0	1	7	2	5	67.7		
Neil Franklin	England	2 December 1963	13 May 1968	234	72	62	100	313	383	−70	30.8		
Dick Graham	England	1 June 1968	7 September 1972	215	91	52	72	317	287	30	42.3	1971 Watney Cup winners	
Dennis Mochan	Scotland	7 September 1972	24 October 1972	11	1	4	6	14	21	−7	9.1		
Jim Smith	England	24 October 1972	20 June 1975	135	55	34	46	191	155	36	40.7		
Bobby Roberts	Scotland	20 June 1975	3 May 1982	375	143	108	124	504	451	53	38.1		
Allan Hunter	Northern Ireland	5 May 1982	18 January 1983	36	17	7	12	51	39	12	47.2		
Cyril Lea	Wales	18 January 1983	10 April 1986	173	71	46	56	294	243	51	41.0		
Mike Walker	Wales	10 April 1986	1 November 1987	83	37	16	30	120	102	18	44.6		
Steve Foley	England	1 November 1987	4 November 1987	1	1	0	0	4	1	3	100.0		
Roger Brown	England	4 November 1987	18 October 1988	47	15	12	20	42	67	−25	31.9		
Steve Foley	England	16 October 1988	8 January 1989	18	5	5	8	28	31	−3	27.7		
Jock Wallace	Scotland	8 January 1989	20 December 1989	52	12	16	24	63	87	−24	23.1		
Steve Foley	England	20 December 1989	3 January 1990	3	2	0	1	5	3	2	66.6		
Mick Mills	England	3 January 1990	9 May 1990	25	8	3	14	27	37	−10	32.0		
Ian Atkins	England	1 June 1990	19 July 1991	51	30	11	10	80	46	34	58.8	1990–91 Conference runners-up	
Roy McDonough	England	1 August 1991	15 May 1994	155	69	33	53	271	226	45	44.5	1991–92 Conference winners 1992 FA Trophy winners	
George Burley	Scotland	1 June 1994	24 December 1994	26	12	6	8	41	38	3	46.2		
Dale Roberts	England	24 December 1994	12 January 1995	5	1	1	3	5	7	−2	20.0		
Steve Wignall	England	12 January 1995	21 January 1999	218	81	64	73	289	283	6	37.2	1998 Third Division play-off winners 1997 League Trophy runners-up	
Steve Whitton^{[A]}	England	21 January 1999	28 January 1999	1	0	1	0	3	3	0	0.0		
Mick Wadsworth	England	28 January 1999	25 August 1999	24	7	7	10	28	41	−13	29.2		
Steve Whitton	England	25 August 1999	29 January 2003	180	52	44	84	221	287	−66	28.8		
Geraint Williams	Wales	29 January 2003	25 February 2003	5	2	3	0	4	4	0	40.0		
Phil Parkinson	England	25 February 2003	14 June 2006	187	79	54	54	256	203	53	42.8	2006 League One runners-up	
Geraint Williams	Wales	28 July 2006	22 September 2008	104	31	27	46	146	161	−15	29.8		
Kit Symons	Wales	22 September 2008	9 October 2008	5	2	0	3	8	9	−1	40.0		
Paul Lambert	Scotland	9 October 2008	18 August 2009	42	19	7	16	55	43	12	45.2		
Joe Dunne	Ireland	18 August 2009	1 September 2009	4	1	1	2	5	6	−1	25.0		
Aidy Boothroyd	England	2 September 2009	20 May 2010	44	19	12	13	56	52	4	43.2	2009–10 Essex Senior Cup winners	
John Ward	England	31 May 2010	24 September 2012	111	33	39	39	139	169	−24	29.7		
Joe Dunne	Ireland	27 September 2012	1 September 2014	45	16	10	19	80	100	−20	35.6		
Tony Humes	England	1 September 2014	26 November 2015	67	22	15	30	101	126	−25	32.8		
Richard Hall	England	26 November 2015	2 December 2015	1	0	0	1	1	5	−4	0.0		
Wayne Brown	England	2 December 2015	21 December 2015	3	1	0	2	6	8	−2	33.3		
Kevin Keen	England	21 December 2015	26 April 2016	24	5	7	12	21	40	−19	20.8		
David Wright	England	26 April 2016	4 May 2016	1	0	1	0	2	2	0	0.0		
Steve Ball	England	4 May 2016	8 May 2016	1	0	0	1	1	2	−1	0.0		
John McGreal	England	8 May 2016	14 July 2020	202	76	55	71	289	264	25	37.6		
Steve Ball	England	28 July 2020	23 February 2021	34	8	13	13	39	47	−8	23.5		
Wayne Brown	England	24 February 2021	31 March 2021	9	1	3	5	5	14	−9	11.1		
Hayden Mullins	England	31 March 2021	13 May 2021	8	3	3	2	8	8	0	37.5		
Hayden Mullins	England	13 May 2021	19 January 2022	32	8	8	16	28	42	−14	25.0		
Wayne Brown	England	19 January 2022	18 September 2022	34	12	9	13	39	41	−2	35.3		
Steve Ball	England	18 September 2022	30 September 2022	1	0	0	1	0	0	0	0		
Matt Bloomfield	England	30 September 2022	21 February 2023	28	9	6	13	28	31	−3	32.1		
Ross Embleton	England	21 February 2023	2 March 2023	2	0	0	2	0	3	−3	0		
Ben Garner	England	2 March 2023	21 October 2023	24	6	6	12	31	36	−5	25.0		
Matthew Etherington	England	23 October 2023	16 November 2023	4	3	1	0	8	4	4	75.0		
Matthew Etherington	England	16 November 2023	1 January 2024	11	2	0	9	10	25	−15	18.2		
Danny Cowley	England	4 January 2024	Present	67	20	29	18	82	76	6	29.9		

== Notes ==
A.: Steve Whitton was joint caretaker manager with Micky Cook for a single match in January 1999.
B.: John McGreal was joint caretaker manager with Richard Hall in November 2015.
