= Frank Stamper =

English footballer

Personal information
- Full name: Frank Fielden Thorpe Stamper
- Date of birth: 22 February 1926
- Place of birth: West Hartlepool, England
- Date of death: July 1999 (aged 73)
- Place of death: Hartlepool, England
- Height: 5 ft 11 in (1.80 m)
- Positions: Centre half; wing half

Senior career*
Years	Team	Apps	(Gls)
- Hartlepools United
- Hesleden Colliery
1947–1949	Colchester United	43	(0)
1949–1958	Hartlepools United	301	(26)
- Blyth Spartans
Total		344	(26)
- * Club domestic league appearances and goals

Frank Fielden Thorpe Stamper (22 February 1926 – July 1999) was an English professional footballer who played as a centre half and wing half in the Football League for Hartlepools United.

Stamper's career began with hometown club Hartlepool as an amateur. He also represented Hesleden Colliery before joining the Army. After World War II, Stamper signed a professional contract with Southern League club Colchester United, where he spent two-and-a-half seasons, before returning to Hartlepool. He went on to make over 300 appearances for Hartlepools United over the course of nine years. He later represented Blyth Spartans.

== Career ==
Stamper, born in West Hartlepool, began his playing career with Hartlepools United as an amateur. Prior to World War II, Stamper had represented Hesleden Colliery, before joining the Army where he was stationed with the Army Fire Fighting Centre at Cherry Tree Camp.

After the war, following a trial game in which he scored two goals, Stamper signed a professional contract with Southern League side Colchester United on 3 March 1947. He played two games in the closing stages of the 1946–47 season, playing both games as left half. He played numerous reserve team games as an inside right. He continued in the reserve team during the 1947–48 campaign for the majority of the season, again playing wing half, before making six appearances late in the season in the same position. Demobbed by the Army in July 1948, Stamper switched to centre half for the 1948–49 season, while he began training on a full-time basis. He replaced the outgoing player-manager Ted Fenton in the centre of defence and went on to make 43 appearances over the course of the season. He refused terms with the club at the end of the season, instead opting to return to his native Hartlepool.

Opting to return to Hartlepools United for the 1949–50 season, Stamper made his Football League debut in the Third Division North win against Bradford City on 3 September 1949. He made 16 appearances in his first season with the club and went on to make 301 Football League and 25 FA Cup appearances for the club between 1949 and 1958, scoring 30 goals in all competitions. He is joint-tenth in the list of Hartlepool's all-time leading appearances, tied with Keith Nobbs on 326, while he is also ranked tenth with 301 Football League appearances.

After leaving Hartlepool in 1958, Stamper joined Blyth Spartans and later became a builder, before retiring in 1991.
