= Darmody =

Darmody can refer to:

== Places ==
- Darmody, Saskatchewan, Canada

== People ==
- Aubrey Darmody (1921–2006), Welsh footballer
- Jimmy Darmody, a fictional character in Boardwalk Empire
- Nathan Darmody, former drummer for Allstar Weekend
- Steve Darmody (1890–1969), Australian rugby league player
- Tim Darmody, Irish architect, designer of Mardyke Gardens, Fitzgerald Park, Cork City, Ireland
