= Bill Bower (footballer) =

Welsh footballer

Personal information
- Full name: Ronald William Charles Bower
- Date of birth: 17 November 1911
- Place of birth: Wrexham, Wales
- Date of death: December 1998 (aged 87)
- Place of death: Colchester, England
- Position: Right-back

Senior career*
Years	Team	Apps	(Gls)
1932–1934	New Brighton	24	(0)
1935–1936	South Liverpool		
1936–1937	Bolton Wanderers	3	(0)
1937–1945	Millwall		
	→ Southend United (guest)	39	(0)
	→ New Brighton (guest)	40	(1)
	→ Aldershot (guest)	44	(5)
1945	→ Colchester United (guest)	10	(0)
1945–1949	Colchester United	45	(0)
1949–1956	Sudbury Town		
Total		205	(6)
- * Club domestic league appearances and goals

Ronald William Charles Bower (17 November 1911 – December 1998) was a Welsh professional footballer who played as a right-back in the Football League for New Brighton and Bolton Wanderers.

Bower began his career as a forward, a position in which he played 24 Football League games for New Brighton between 1932 and 1934. He then joined non-League side South Liverpool, before continuing in the Football League with Bolton Wanderers, where he made three appearances. He then moved south to Millwall in the Southern League. The onset of World War II limited the number of games that Bower could play, but he did make guest appearances for Southend United, New Brighton and Aldershot. He joined Colchester United as a guest in 1945, but signed professional terms in November 1945, remaining with the club until 1949 and making 55 Southern League appearances. He wound down his playing career with Sudbury Town.

== Career ==
Born in Wrexham, Bower began his professional career as a forward with Football League club New Brighton. He made 24 appearances between 1932 and 1934 before joining non-League outfit South Liverpool in 1935. He returned to the Football League one year later with Bolton Wanderers, where he was converted into a right-back - a position he would remain in for the rest of his career. Bower made three appearances for Bolton before moving to London to play for Millwall in the Southern League in 1937.

The outbreak of World War II curtailed his professional career, but Bower did make guest appearances for a number of clubs. He made 39 appearances for Southend United, 40 appearances in addition to one goal for his first club New Brighton, and 44 appearances for Aldershot, scoring five goals.

Bower joined Colchester United as a guest for their 1945–46 campaign, where he made ten appearances prior to signing a professional contract with the club. He signed on 28 November 1945 and was ever-present for an entire season where Colchester used 80 players, playing all 20 league fixtures and 10 cup ties. He was one of only four players to be retained at the end of the 1945–46 season.

With Colchester's squad already possessing two players by the name of Ronald, manager Syd Fieldus decided to refer to Bower as Bill, owing to his middle name of William. In his second season with the club, Bower made a further 30 league appearances, seven Southern League Cup games and two FA Cup outings, missing just one game all season.

Bower stepped aside to allow the developing Digger Kettle to progress in Colchester's first-team for the 1947–48 season, acting as cover whilst captaining and coaching the reserve team in the Eastern Counties League. After failing to make an appearance in the 1948–49 season, Bower undertook an FA coaching badge during the 1949–50 season, while spending the summer months providing local schools with his coaching knowledge. He made his final two Colchester United appearances during the season, replacing the injured Kettle for games against Hereford United and Dartford on 1 October 1949.

Bower left Colchester to join Sudbury Town, where he played until 1956. Outside of football, he worked in the dispatch department for Woods in Colchester. He died in the town in December 1998.

Sporting positions
Preceded by Jimmy Jenkins	Colchester United captain 1946–1947	Succeeded by Bob Curry
