= Trevor Smith (footballer, born 1910) =

English footballer and manager (1910–1997)

Personal information
- Full name: John Trevor Smith
- Date of birth: 8 September 1910
- Place of birth: West Stanley, England
- Date of death: 23 October 1997 (aged 87)
- Place of death: Bracknell, England
- Height: 5 ft 5 in (1.65 m)
- Position: Inside forward

Youth career
- South Moor
- Annfield Plain

Senior career*
Years	Team	Apps	(Gls)
1933–1935	Charlton Athletic	23	(6)
1935–1938	Fulham	93	(19)
1938–1946	Crystal Palace	57	(14)
- → Fulham (guest)
- → Notts County (guest)
- → Nottingham Forest (guest)
- → Tottenham Hotspur (guest)
1946–1947	Yeovil Town		
1947	Colchester United	8	(2)
1947–1948	Watford	10	(0)
1948–1949	Bedford Town		
Total		191	(41)

Managerial career
- 1949: Wingate
- * Club domestic league appearances and goals

John Trevor Smith (8 September 1910 – 23 October 1997), better known as Trevor Smith, was an English professional footballer and manager who played as an inside forward in the Football League for Charlton Athletic, Fulham, Crystal Palace and Watford. He also managed Wingate.

After beginning his career as an amateur in the Stanley area, Smith was signed by Charlton Athletic in 1933 following a trial. He was signed by Fulham in 1935 and would make 93 appearances for the club. He joined Crystal Palace in 1938, and remained with the club through the war years. Smith made guest appearances for Fulham, Notts County, Nottingham Forest and Tottenham Hotspur.

At the end of the war, Smith joined Yeovil Town but was then poached by Southern League rivals Colchester United towards the end of the 1946–47 season. He made a return to League football in 1947, joining Watford. Bedford Town signed Smith for the 1948–49 season, where he was made captain. He then became manager of Wingate in 1949.

== Career ==
Born in Stanley, Smith had trials for three Football League clubs having developed as an amateur player with South Moor and Annfield Plain. Following trials with Portsmouth, Blackpool and Charlton Athletic in the early 1930s, Charlton signed Smith in 1933. He scored six goals in 23 appearances for Charlton before making a move to Fulham in March 1935 for a £1,000 fee.

Smith helped Fulham reach the semi-final of the FA Cup in 1936 and went on to score 19 goals in 93 appearances. Crystal Palace signed Smith from Fulham on 4 February 1938 for £2,500. Here, he scored 14 goals in 57 games, but his Palace career was interrupted by World War II. He remained with the club during the war years, but made guest appearances for Fulham, Notts County, Nottingham Forest and Tottenham Hotspur.

After the war, Smith left Palace in May 1946 to join Southern League side Yeovil Town. He was then brought to league rivals Colchester United by Ted Fenton on 15 March 1947, making his debut against Yeovil in a 1–1 draw between the sides at The Huish on 23 March. He made eight league appearances for Colchester, scoring twice before being released at the end of the season.

Smith made a return to the Football League when he was picked up by Watford ahead of the 1947–48 season, making just ten appearances. He then moved back to the Southern League for the 1948–49 season, joining Bedford Town where he was made captain. In 1949, Smith was manager at Wingate.
