= Fred Dell =

English footballer

Personal information
- Full name: Frederick Dell
- Date of birth: 10 December 1915
- Place of birth: Dartford, England
- Date of death: 1970 (aged 54–55)
- Place of death: Dartford, England
- Height: 6 ft 1/2 in (1.84 m)
- Position: Inside right

Senior career*
Years	Team	Apps	(Gls)
–1935	Dartford		
1935–1938	West Ham United	4	(0)
1938–1939	Doncaster Rovers	29	(12)
- * Club domestic league appearances and goals

Fred Dell (10 December 1915 – 1970) was an English footballer who played as an inside right for Dartford and in The Football League for West Ham United and Doncaster Rovers.

== Club career ==
Born in Dartford, Kent, Dell joined his hometown club Dartford. Signed by West Ham in 1935 for a reported fee of £2,000, he played only four games with his debut coming on 14 December 1936 in a 2–0 home defeat by Sheffield United. Dell moved to Doncaster Rovers in 1938 along with Albert Walker in exchange for Rovers Arthur Banner. He made 33 appearances in league and cup games, including two in the 1939–40 season before war broke out and he left for the forces. In addition to his 12 league goals he scored 4 in the FA Cup.
