= Harry Wright (footballer, born 1909) =

English footballer and manager

Personal information
- Full name: Harold Edward Wright
- Date of birth: 3 June 1909
- Place of birth: Tottenham, London, England
- Date of death: April 1994 (aged 84)
- Place of death: King's Lynn, England
- Position: Goalkeeper

Senior career*
Years	Team	Apps	(Gls)
- Harwich & Parkeston
1932–1935	Charlton Athletic	38	(0)
1936–1937	Aldershot	28	(0)
	Derby County	25	(0)
- Chelmsford City
1946–1949	Colchester United	50	(0)
Total		141	(0)

International career
1935	England XI	1	(0)

Managerial career
- 1959: Lebanon
- 1961–1963: India U19
- 1963–1964: India
Medal record
Men's football
Representing India (as manager)
AFC Asian Cup
Runner-up	1964
- * Club domestic league appearances and goals

Harold Edward Wright (3 June 1909 – April 1994) was an English professional footballer and manager who played as a goalkeeper in the Football League for Charlton Athletic, Aldershot, and Derby County. He managed the Lebanon national team in 1959 and the India national team between 1963 and 1964.

Wright began his playing career with Harwich & Parkeston, but by 1932 he was on the books at Charlton, where he remained for three years. He spent time with Aldershot and then Derby County before the outbreak of World War II. He also appeared for Southern League sides Chelmsford City and Colchester United. He represented an England XI once in 1935 against an Anglo-Scot team in a friendly game for the King George V Jubilee Trust Fund.

Wright took up a coaching role at Guildford City following his retirement in 1949, before holding similar positions at Walsall and Luton Town. He was named as head coach at Everton in 1956, and later coached the India youth team between 1961 and 1963 in preparation for the 1963 AFC Youth Championship. In 1963, he inherited Syed Abdul Rahim's India national team, where Wright led the side to the runners-up spot in the 1964 Asian Cup, which remains the most notable triumph in professional football for India.

== Club career ==
Born in Tottenham, London, Wright initially played for Essex outfit Harwich & Parkeston, but by 1932 he had joined Football League side Charlton Athletic. Between 1932 and 1935, Wright made 38 league appearances, despite being understudy to Sam Bartram as Charlton rose from the Third Division to the First Division.

During the 1936–37 season, Wright played 28 times for Aldershot as they finished bottom of the Football League. However, a fee of £2,500 saw him move to Derby County for the following season, where he played 25 times.

In the war years, Wright played at Layer Road, the ground of his future club Colchester United alongside his future manager Ted Fenton while playing for an Eastern Command side. Having also played for Southern League side Chelmsford City, Wright signed for Essex rivals Colchester United on 11 July 1946. Despite playing 23 times for Colchester, the club initially decided to not retain Wright for the 1947–48 season, but a month later, a change of heart saw Wright re-sign. In his second season, he helped Colchester reach the fifth round of the FA Cup, but within weeks of the beginning of the 1948–49 season, Wright had suffered an injury that saw him lose his place to Ken Whitehead. His attempted comeback on 23 April 1949 against Merthyr Tydfil ended early due to injury, meaning Colchester were forced to play forward Vic Keeble in goal. It would be his final appearance for the club. He made 69 appearances for Colchester in all competitions.

== International career ==
Wright made one appearance for an England XI side that played an Anglo-Scots team in the King George V Jubilee Trust Fund friendly held at Highbury on 8 May 1935. A crowd of 8,944 witnessed the 1–0 defeat for the England side, with Manchester United's George Mutch scoring the only goal of the game.

== Coaching career ==
On leaving Colchester in the summer of 1949, Wright was appointed trainer-coach at Guildford City. After qualifying as an FA coach and physiotherapist, Wright would hold coaching positions at Walsall and Luton Town before being appointed head coach of First Division Everton in September 1956.

In 1959, Wright coached the Lebanon national team at the qualifiers for the 1960 Summer Olympics. Between 1961 and 1963, Wright spent time in India coaching the Indian youth team in preparation for the 1963 AFC Youth Championship in Malaya. Wright then inherited Syed Abdul Rahim's side to become the first foreign coach of the India national football team after Rahim died in 1963. Wright was tasked with taking his side to the 1964 AFC Asian Cup. They finished as runners-up to hosts Israel in the round-robin tournament, which to-date remains the best achievement in Indian professional football.

Wright retired to King's Lynn in Norfolk, where he died in April 1994.
