= Andy Brown (footballer, born 1915) =

Scottish footballer

Personal information
- Full name: Andrew Brown
- Date of birth: 20 February 1915
- Place of birth: Coatbridge, Scotland
- Date of death: 1973 (aged 57–58)
- Place of death: Colchester, England
- Position: Forward

Senior career*
Years	Team	Apps	(Gls)
- Cumbernauld Thistle
1936–1938	Cardiff City	2	(0)
1938–1947	Torquay United	34	(5)
1947–1949	Colchester United	57	(2)
Total		91	(7)
- * Club domestic league appearances and goals

Andrew Brown (20 February 1915 – 1973) was a Scottish footballer who played as a forward in the Football League for Torquay United.

== Career ==
Born in Coatbridge, Brown began his career with Scottish amateur outfit Cumbernauld Thistle. He later joined Cardiff City, making three appearances for the side over two years. He moved to Torquay United in 1938, making 34 league appearances and scoring five goals after World War II.

Brown joined Southern League club Colchester United in 1947, making his debut in the opening game of the 1947–48 season in a 5–1 victory at Bedford Town. He scored his first goal for Colchester in a 2–1 FA Cup first round win over Banbury Spencer on 29 November 1947. His first league goal came during a 1–1 draw at Bath City on 13 March 1948. His final goal came in a 3–0 win over Yeovil Town on 24 April 1948, and made his last appearance for the club the following season in a 2–0 loss to Merthyr Tydfil on 23 April 1949.

Andrew Brown died in 1973.
