= Peter Chiswick =

English footballer

Personal information
- Full name: Peter John Henry Chiswick
- Date of birth: 19 September 1929
- Place of birth: Plaistow, Essex, England
- Date of death: August 1962 (aged 32)
- Height: 5 ft 10 in (1.78 m)
- Position: Goalkeeper

Youth career
- 1946–1954: West Ham United

Senior career*
Years	Team	Apps	(Gls)
1946–1947	Colchester United	11	(0)
1946–1956	West Ham United	19	(0)
1956–1957	Gillingham	14	(0)
- Margate
- Barking
Total		44	(0)
- * Club domestic league appearances and goals

Peter John Henry Chiswick (19 September 1929 – August 1962) was an English professional footballer who played as a goalkeeper in the Football League for West Ham United and Gillingham.

Chiswick initially signed amateur terms with Colchester United in 1946, while also registering for West Ham's colts team. His performances during the 1946–47 season saw West Ham sign Chiswick professionally, but he had to wait until 1954 to have his first taste of first-team football. After 19 league appearances, Chiswick left the club in 1956 to join Gillingham. Here, he made 14 appearances, and later turned out for Margate and Barking.

== Career ==
Born in Plaistow, Essex, Chiswick hailed from Wivenhoe, Essex. He signed for nearby Southern League side Colchester United as an amateur on 14 July 1946. He was also registered to West Ham United's colts team. Following in his father's footsteps as a goalkeeper, Chiswick made 15 appearances for Colchester during the 1946–47 season, and his performances impressed enough that West Ham decided to offer him a professional contract in July 1947. Colchester asked to keep Chiswick for the 1947–48 season, but West Ham declined and Chiswick continued his development in their Football Combination and Eastern Counties League teams.

Chiswick finally made his West Ham and Football League debut on 6 February 1954 as his side defeated Leeds United 5–2. He made 19 consecutive appearances from the latter stages of the 1953–54 season and the early part of the 1954–55 season, before losing his place in the starting line-up.

For the 1956–57 season, Chiswick moved to Third Division South side Gillingham, where over the course of the season, he made 14 league appearances. After this season, Chiswick remained in Kent with Margate, before becoming player-coach at Barking. He died in August 1962 from a throat infection.
