= Arthur Banner =

English footballer (1918–1980)

Personal information
- Date of birth: 28 June 1918
- Place of birth: Sheffield, Yorkshire, England
- Date of death: 30 April 1980 (aged 61)
- Place of death: Thorpe Bay, Essex
- Position: Defender

Senior career*
Years	Team	Apps	(Gls)
1937–1938	Doncaster Rovers	0	(0)
1938–1948	West Ham United	27	(0)
1948–1953	Leyton Orient	164	(1)
- Sittingbourne

Managerial career
- Sittingbourne
- Ilford
- * Club domestic league appearances and goals

Arthur Banner (28 June 1918 – 30 April 1980) was an English footballer who played as a defender for Doncaster Rovers, West Ham United, Leyton Orient and Sittingbourne where he was also the player-manager.

== Playing career ==
=== Doncaster Rovers ===
Born in Sheffield, Banner started his football career with Doncaster Rovers where he made no league appearances but played 4 games in the Division 3 North Challenge Cup where Rovers lost in extra time in the semi-final. At the end of the season, he moved to West Ham United in exchange for Fred Dell and Albert Walker.

=== West Ham United ===
In his first season at West Ham in 1938, Banner played just one Football League game, a 2–0 home win against Southampton on 22 April 1939, before the outbreak of World War II. During the war, Banner served in the Essex Regiment and the Royal Artillery rising to the rank of sergeant. He continued to play for West Ham during the war and after it ended played 26 more games before moving to Leyton Orient in February 1948.

== Management ==
He later became player-manager of Sittingbourne and was coach to Ilford when they reached the FA Amateur Cup in 1958 which they lost 3–0 to Woking.

Banner died in Thorpe Bay in Essex in April 1980.
