= Jack Finch (footballer, born 1909) =

English footballer and manager

Personal information
- Full name: John Finch
- Date of birth: 3 February 1909
- Place of birth: West Ham, Essex, England
- Date of death: 15 November 1993 (aged 84)
- Place of death: Worthing, England
- Height: 5 ft 7 1/2 in (1.71 m)
- Position: Winger

Senior career*
Years	Team	Apps	(Gls)
- Walthamstow Avenue
1930–1946	Fulham	280	(50)
- → Brentford (guest)
- → Crystal Palace (guest)
1946	Colchester United	3	(0)
Total		283	(50)

Managerial career
- 1949: Nigeria
- 1950–1952: Valur
- * Club domestic league appearances and goals

John Finch (3 February 1909 – 15 November 1993) was an English professional footballer and manager who played as a winger in the Football League for Fulham, where he made over 280 appearances, and was the first manager of the Nigeria touring team. He also spent two years managing Icelandic side Valur.

Finch's entire professional playing career was spent with Fulham. He joined in 1930 and remained with the club for 16 years, throughout World War II. He made 295 appearances for the club between 1930 and 1939, and made a further 72 appearances during the war years. He also guested for Brentford and Crystal Palace during this time. He had a brief stint with Colchester United following the hostilities.

Finch was the first coach of the Nigeria national team, taking charge of the side in 1949 for their tour of England, in which they played a number of friendlies against varying opposition. He later managed Icelandic side Valur between 1950 and 1952.

== Playing career ==
Born in West Ham, Finch began his career at Walthamstow Avenue. He was invited for a trial at Aston Villa in 1929, but he eventually signed for Fulham as an amateur in October 1930. Just one month later, Finch had signed a professional deal with the club. During Finch's second season with the club, he earned a medal when Fulham lifted the Third Division South championship in the 1931–32 season. Finch played in 15 FA Cup ties for the Cottagers, which included the 1935–36 semi-final defeat to eventual runners-up Sheffield United. Finch would go on to make 280 league appearances and score 50 goals, and as such was the only player to feature in every season in the 1930s. With the outbreak of World War II, Finch continued to play for Fulham during the war years, racking up a further 72 wartime league appearances. He also made guest appearances for Brentford and Crystal Palace.

Finch signed for Southern League club Colchester United on 8 August 1946. He made just three appearances for Colchester in August and September 1946.

== Managerial career ==
Finch was the first coach to the Nigeria touring team in 1949. Meeting his players at Liverpool docks, he took charge of the group for their first training session ahead of their first match against Marine. His side won 5–2, and won further games against Dulwich Hamlet and Bromley. They drew twice against a Corinthian League XI and South Liverpool, but lost to Bishop Auckland, Leytonstone, an Isthmian League XI and an Athenian League XI. His side played many of their games barefoot.

Finch later coached Icelandic team Valur between 1950 and 1952. He later became a freelance reporter in the West Ham area, before taking up a driving job in the Lowestoft area.
