= Frank Rist =

English cricketer & footballer

Personal information
- Full name: Frank Henry Rist
- Born: 30 March 1914; Wandsworth, London, England
- Died: 8 September 2001 (aged 87); Whipps Cross, Essex, England
- Height: 6 ft 0 in (183 cm)
- Batting: Right-handed
- Bowling: Right arm medium
- Role: Wicket-keeper

Domestic team information
- Years: Team
- 1934-1953: Essex

Career statistics
| Competition | FC |
|---|---|
| Matches | 65 |
| Runs scored | 1,496 |
| Batting average | 15.11 |
| 100s/50s | 0/3 |
| Top score | 62* |
| Balls bowled |
| Wickets | 1 |
| Bowling average | 8.00 |
| 5 wickets in innings | 0 |
| 10 wickets in match | 0 |
| Best bowling | 1/8 |
| Catches/stumpings | 35/5 |
- Source: Cricinfo, 5 December 2020

Frank Rist (30 March 1914 – 8 September 2001) was an English cricketer. He played for Essex between 1934 and 1953. He also played football as a centre half in the Football League for Charlton Athletic.
