= Ben Burley =

English footballer

Personal information
- Full name: Benjamin Burley
- Date of birth: 2 November 1907
- Place of birth: Sheffield, England
- Date of death: 25 January 2003 (aged 95)
- Place of death: Great Yarmouth, England
- Height: 5 ft 7 in (1.70 m)
- Position: Outside forward

Youth career
- Darnall School
- Netherhope Institute
- Woodhouse Mill United

Senior career*
Years	Team	Apps	(Gls)
1931–1933	Sheffield United	0	(0)
1933–1934	Southampton	2	(0)
1934–1935	Grimsby Town	22	(5)
1935–1938	Norwich City	35	(4)
1938–1939	Darlington	35	(7)
1939–1940	Chelmsford City		

Managerial career
- 1951–1954: Chelmsford City
- * Club domestic league appearances and goals

Benjamin Burley (2 November 1907 – 25 January 2003) was an English professional footballer who played as an outside-forward for various clubs in the 1930s, including Southampton, Grimsby Town, Norwich City and Darlington. He was later a coach before becoming manager of Chelmsford City in the 1950s.

== Football career ==
=== Playing career ===
Burley was born in Sheffield where he was educated at Darnall School and played football as a youth for Netherhope Institute and Woodhouse Mill United. He also played schoolboy football for the Sheffield and Yorkshire F.A.s.

In November 1931, he joined Sheffield United but never made any first-team appearances before a transfer to the south coast to join Southampton of the Football League Second Division in September 1933. Described as a "stocky and thrustful winger", he was used as cover for Fred Tully and Bill Luckett and his only first-team appearances came at outside-left in the last two matches of the 1933–34 season, both defeats.

In the summer of 1934, he moved to Grimsby Town who had just been promoted to the First Division. Burley remained for a season, scoring five goals in 22 appearances as Grimsby finished fifth in the league, their highest-ever league position.

Burley moved on in the summer of 1935, to return to the Second Division with Norwich City. He made his debut on 7 September 1935 and played 35 league matches, scoring four goals, over a three-year period, before joining Darlington in May 1938. In his one season at Feethams, Burley rarely missed a match in the Third Division North, scoring seven goals from 35 league appearances.

In July 1939, he dropped out of the Football League to join Chelmsford City, who had joined the Southern League a year earlier. In a season which was truncated because of the Second World War, Chelmsford won the Eastern section and then drew with Lovell's Athletic in the play-offs; both teams were declared joint champions.

During the war, Burley played as a guest for various clubs, including Southend United, Millwall, Brighton & Hove Albion, Queens Park Rangers and Crystal Palace.

=== Coaching and management career ===
After the war, Burley obtained his F.A. coaching badge, before working as a coach in the Netherlands.

In June 1951, he returned to Chelmsford City, initially as a coach, before replacing Billy Walsh as manager in August. In Burley's three seasons in charge at Chelmsford, the club finished in the lower half of the Southern League table and in 1954, Burley was replaced by Frank Grice. In his time as manager, Chelmsford City played 105 matches, of which 30 were won, 21 drawn and 54 lost.

== Honours ==
=== As a player ===
Chelmsford City

- Southern League champions: 1939–40
