= Arthur Biggs =

English footballer

Personal information
- Full name: Arthur Gilbert Biggs
- Date of birth: 26 May 1915
- Place of birth: Wootton, England
- Date of death: 15 January 1996 (aged 80)
- Place of death: Luton, England
- Height: 5 ft 11 in (1.80 m)
- Position: Forward

Senior career*
| Years | Team | Apps | (Gls) |
| 1933–1937 | Arsenal | 3 | (0) |
| 1937–1938 | Heart of Midlothian | 19 | (12) |
| 1938–1946 | Aberdeen | 23 | (8) |
| 1939–1940 | → Luton Town (guest) | 19 | (5) |
- → Watford (guest)
- → Crystal Palace (guest)
| 1945 | → Ipswich Town (guest) | 5 | (1) |
| 1946–1947 | Bedford Town | | |
| 1947 | Colchester United | 12 | (4) |
- Vauxhall Motors
| Total | | 81 | (30) |
- * Club domestic league appearances and goals

Arthur Gilbert Biggs (26 May 1915 – 15 January 1996) was an English professional footballer who played as a forward in the Football League for Arsenal and in the Scottish Football League for Heart of Midlothian and Aberdeen.

Biggs spent three and a half years in the Arsenal Reserve team before finally making his professional debut in 1937. He played three times for Arsenal before moving to Hearts. Here, he scored 12 league goals in 19 appearances when he moved to Aberdeen in 1938. He remained registered with Aberdeen through the war years. He made guest appearances for Luton Town, Watford, Crystal Palace and Ipswich Town, before returning to his home county to play for Bedford Town in 1946. He moved to Southern League rivals Colchester United toward the end of the season, spending six months in Essex before moving back to Luton to play for the Vauxhall Motors works team.

== Career ==
Born in Wootton, Bedfordshire, Biggs joined Arsenal as an amateur in October 1933. He turned professional two months later and spent three and a half years in the reserve side when his efforts in the Football Combination, 41 goals for the season which was then a club record, earned him a call-up to the first-team squad. He made his Arsenal debut on 29 March 1937 in a 0–0 draw with Stoke City. He made two further appearances for Arsenal before making a £2,500 move to Heart of Midlothian in December 1937.

Frank Moss brought Biggs to Hearts on 9 December 1937, making his debut two days later. He helped the club to the runners-up spot in his first season with the club and would score 12 goals in 19 games. He made a move to Aberdeen early in the 1938–39 season, but his appearances were limited with the outbreak of World War II. He remained registered to Aberdeen during the war years when he returned to Bedfordshire to join Luton Town. Here, he made 19 guest appearances and scored five goals during the 1939–40 season. Biggs also made wartime guest appearances for Watford, Crystal Palace and Ipswich Town, the latter of which he played five games and scored one goal in the Football League South in 1945.

After the war, Biggs joined Southern League side Bedford Town during the 1946–47 season while employed at the Vauxhall Motors Luton plant. He joined league rivals Colchester United for the final four games of the season, scoring three goals. He scored a further two goals in ten appearances during the 1947–48 season, but left the club in November 1948. He then returned to play for the Vauxhall Motors works team in Luton, playing in the Spartan League.
