= Bob Curry =

English footballer

Personal information
- Full name: Robert Curry
- Date of birth: 2 November 1918
- Place of birth: Gateshead, England
- Date of death: June 2001 (aged 82)
- Position: Inside forward

Senior career*
Years	Team	Apps	(Gls)
1936–1937	Gateshead		
1937–1938	Sheffield Wednesday	1	(0)
1939–1940	→ Bradford Park Avenue (wartime guest)	5	(3)
1940–1941	→ Sheffield Wednesday (wartime)	7	(1)
1943–1944	→ Leeds United (wartime guest)	1	(2)
1943–1944	→ Lincoln City (wartime guest)	1	(0)
1944–1945	→ Mansfield Town (wartime guest)	13	(5)
1944–1946	→ Sheffield United (wartime guest)	19	(6)
1945–1946	Gainsborough Trinity		
1946–1951	Colchester United	138	(78)
1951–195?	Clacton Town		
–	Halstead Town		

Managerial career
- –: Clacton Town
- –: Halstead Town
- * Club domestic league appearances and goals

Robert Curry (2 November 1918 – June 2001) was an English professional footballer who played as an inside forward for Sheffield Wednesday and Colchester United in the Football League.

== Career ==
=== Early career ===
Curry started his football career with his hometown club, Gateshead of the Third Division North, in the 1936–37 season. He did not make a first team appearance before signing for Second Division Sheffield Wednesday in September 1937. He only made one first team appearance with the Owls and that was in his first season of 1937–38, when he made his debut at Hillsborough in a 1–2 loss to Aston Villa on 18 September 1937.

=== War years ===
Curry played seven times for Sheffield Wednesday in 1940–41 and scored once but that was all the games he took part in for his employers during the war years. Prior to this, he also guested five times for Bradford Park Avenue in 1939–40 and scored three goals. He guested for Leeds United in the 1943–44 Football League Northern Section (Second Championship) in a 2–2 draw at Derby County in which Curry scored both Leeds goals. Curry had one game for Lincoln City in 1943–44 but did not score. He scored five times in thirteen games for Mansfield Town in the 1944–45 season and also played six times and scored once for Sheffield United in the same season and then scored five times in thirteen games for them in the 1945–46 season. He left Hillsborough for non-league Gainsborough Trinity and then with Colchester United, where he was a consistent scorer in their Southern League days.

=== Colchester United ===
Curry signed for Colchester before the start of the 1946–47 season and made his debut for them, and scored, just a couple of months before his twenty-eighth birthday in the home match with Gloucester City on 31 August 1946 which they lost 2–3. He was the second on the goalscoring list in Southern League matches with fourteen, eight behind leading scorer Arthur Turner, as they finished eighth. 1947–48 saw them fourth with Curry scoring seventeen but still eight behind Turner. 1948–49 saw Colchester again fourth and runners-up in the Southern League Cup with Curry netting another seventeen goals, eleven behind Turner. In 1949–50 Colchester finished second on goal average to Merthyr Tydfil and won the Southern League Cup, beating Bath City 6–4 on aggregate in the two-legged final. Curry scored twenty league goals, but was third on the list behind Vic Keeble, who had forty, and Fred Cutting with twenty-one. On 3 June 1950 Gillingham, who polled forty-four votes, and Colchester, who polled twenty-eight, were elected to the Football League because of their support base while Merthyr Tydfil only polled one and missed out. In his association with Colchester from 1946 to 1947 to 1949–50 Bob Curry had scored 68 goals in 139 appearances in the Southern League, scored eight goals in ten FA Cup ties and 14 goals in 23 Southern League Cup ties, a total of 90 goals in 172 games. In the 1950–51 season in which Colchester played in the Football League Third Division South, Colchester's first-ever league game was against old Southern League foes Gillingham at Priestfield on 19 August 1950, when a crowd of 19,542 witnessed a 0–0 draw. Five days later Curry scored United's first-ever League goal in a 1–1 draw at Swindon Town. He top-scored with 13 goals in 32 games in the league and scored twice in two FA Cup games, as Colchester finished 16th.

By the end of his Colchester career, Curry had played 138 league games for the U's, scoring 78 goals in that time. He was a captain of the team and led the U's through their momentous FA Cup run of 1947–48, which saw the non-league side reach the Fifth Round, knocking out the giants of Huddersfield Town along the way. He scored the winning goals against the Terriers and against Wrexham in that cup run, along with two more in the win over Bradford Park Avenue. He left Layer Road to become the Player-Manager of Clacton Town and later Halstead Town. Bob Curry died in June 2001, and he was posthumously inducted into the Colchester United Hall of Fame in 2011.

== Honours ==
=== Club ===
Colchester United

- Southern League runner-up: 1949–50
- Southern League Cup: 1949–50
- Southern League Cup runner-up: 1947–48, 1948–49
