= Albert Page =

English footballer

Personal information
- Full name: Albert Edward Page
- Date of birth: 18 March 1916
- Place of birth: Walthamstow, England
- Date of death: 1995 (aged 78–79)
- Height: 5 ft 10 1/2 in (1.79 m)
- Position: Centre half

Senior career*
Years	Team	Apps	(Gls)
- Leyton
1936–1945	Tottenham Hotspur	55	(0)
- Colchester United
- Chingford Town
- * Club domestic league appearances and goals

Albert Edward Page (18 March 1916 – 1995) was an English professional footballer who played for Leyton, Tottenham Hotspur, Colchester United and Chingford Town.

== Football career ==
Page began his career at Leyton. In 1936 the centre half joined Tottenham Hotspur. Between 1936 and 1946, Page made 56 appearances in all competitions for the Lilywhites. After leaving White Hart Lane he played at Colchester United before ending his career at non League Chingford Town.
