= Ian Gillespie (footballer) =

English footballer

Personal information
- Full name: Ian Colin Gillespie
- Date of birth: 6 May 1913
- Place of birth: Plymouth, England
- Date of death: 5 March 1988 (aged 74)
- Place of death: Ipswich, England
- Position: Forward

Youth career
- Frost's Athletic

Senior career*
Years	Team	Apps	(Gls)
- Norwich City
- Harwich & Parkeston
1937–1946	Crystal Palace	21	(4)
1945–1946	Ipswich Town (guest)		
1946–1947	Ipswich Town	6	(1)
1947	Colchester United	4	(1)
- Leiston
Total		31	(6)
- * Club domestic league appearances and goals

Ian Colin Gillespie (6 May 1913 – 5 March 1988) was an English footballer who played in the Football League as a forward for Crystal Palace and Ipswich Town. He was also signed to Norwich City.

== Career ==
Born in Plymouth, Gillespie began his career playing for Frost's Athletic, a youth club associated with Norwich City. He signed for Norwich in 1933, prior to signing for Harwich & Parkeston in the non-leagues. From there, he signed for Crystal Palace in February 1937. He appeared 27 times and scored five goals for Palace, including four goals in 21 league appearances. He also made over 80 wartime appearances for Palace.

During World War II, Gillespie made guest appearances at a number of clubs, including Ipswich Town, where he played 29 first-team games during the war years, scoring four goals. He signed for Ipswich permanently in April 1946, going on to make six Football League appearances, scoring once before moving to Southern League neighbours Colchester United in May 1947.

Gillespie made his Colchester debut on 17 May in a 2–0 away defeat to Bedford Town. He scored his first, and only, league goal in the reverse fixture one-week later, on this occasion a 4–0 victory at Layer Road. His final game came on 11 September 1947, a 3–0 Southern League Cup victory over rivals Chelmsford City, a game in which he also scored.

After leaving Colchester, Gillespie would later play for Leiston. He died in Ipswich on 5 March 1988.
