= Albert Walker (footballer) =

English footballer

Personal information
- Date of birth: 4 February 1910
- Place of birth: Little Lever, England
- Date of death: April 1993
- Height: 5 ft 11 in (1.80 m)
- Position: Full-back

Senior career*
Years	Team	Apps	(Gls)
- Little Lever United
1928	Southport		
1928	Bolton Wanderers		
1929–1932	Barrow	72	(11)
1932–1938	West Ham United	162	(0)
1938–1942	Doncaster Rovers	37	(0)
- Gainsborough Trinity
1946–1948	Colchester United	29	(0)
- * Club domestic league appearances and goals

Albert Walker (4 February 1910 – April 1993) was an English professional footballer who played as a full-back in the Football League for Barrow, West Ham United and Doncaster Rovers.

Walker was born in Little Lever, near Bolton, Lancashire. After moving from his school team to Little Lever United of the Bolton and District League, Walker signed as an amateur for Southport. He spent little over a year at Haig Avenue before moving to Bolton Wanderers of the First Division.

Competing with Bob Haworth and Alex Finney, Walker found his chances limited and moved to Third Division North side Barrow the following year.

After 72 games and 11 goals for Barrow, Walker was picked up by London club West Ham United, who had just been relegated to the Second Division. He made his Hammers debut against Oldham Athletic, a 5–2 win at Upton Park. Walker spent six years at West Ham, forming a partnership with Alf Chalkley, and was an ever-present during the 1934–35 season. He played his last game for the club on 28 December 1937 against Norwich City.

Walker left in 1938 to join Doncaster Rovers along with Fred Dell in an exchange which took Arthur Banner down south. He made 37 League and 5 FA Cup appearances for Rovers, plus 3 appearances in the curtailed 1939–40 season. He spent World War II with the National Fire Service, and continued playing for Doncaster in the Wartime Leagues and cup competitions, making at least 81 appearances during that time, still without scoring. His last game for Rovers was on 16 December 1942 in a 1–1 draw at Barnsley.

Walker later joined Gainsborough Trinity and then Southern League club Colchester United, where he made 39 league and cup appearances.

He later rejoined West Ham as coach of the Metropolitan League team, then worked his way up through the Eastern Counties League and Football Combination teams before working with the first team. He retired in 1980.
