= Aubrey Darmody =

Welsh footballer

Personal information
- Full name: Aubrey Darmody
- Date of birth: 17 May 1921
- Place of birth: Swansea, Wales
- Date of death: 9 February 2006 (aged 84)
- Place of death: Great Yarmouth, England
- Position: Full-back

Senior career*
Years	Team	Apps	(Gls)
- Tower United
- Cardiff Nomads
1946–1947	Norwich City	2	(0)
1948	Colchester United	3	(0)
- Great Yarmouth Town
Total		5	(0)
- * Club domestic league appearances and goals

Aubrey Darmody (17 May 1921 – 9 February 2006) was a Welsh footballer who played in the Football League as a full-back for Norwich City.

== Career ==
Born in Swansea, Darmody played in Wales for Tower United and Cardiff Nomads before joining English Third Division South side Norwich City in 1946. He made two appearances for the Canaries, making his debut on Christmas Day 1946 away to Bournemouth in a 1–0 victory. He was on the team sheet for the return fixture the following day at Carrow Road in what was to be his final appearance for Norwich in a 6–1 defeat.

Darmody joined Colchester United in 1948, making his debut in a 2–1 Southern League win over Guildford City on 29 March. His final appearance came less than one month later in a 2–1 away defeat to Exeter City Reserves on 14 April 1948. After leaving Colchester, he signed for Great Yarmouth Town where he had a trophy named in his honour for the 'outstanding young player' of the year.

Aubrey Darmody died in Great Yarmouth on 9 February 2006, leaving behind wife Cindy and daughter Lynne.
