= Dennis Hillman =

English footballer

Personal information
- Full name: Dennis Victor Hillman
- Date of birth: 27 November 1918
- Place of birth: Southend-on-Sea, England
- Date of death: 22 December 1994 (aged 76)
- Place of death: Colchester, England
- Position: Outside right

Senior career*
Years	Team	Apps	(Gls)
–1944	Barking		
1944–1946	Brighton & Hove Albion	0	(0)
1946–1951	Colchester United	111	(18)
1951–1952	Gillingham	21	(0)
- Hastings United
- Ramsgate Athletic
Total		133	(18)
- * Club domestic league appearances and goals

Dennis Victor Hillman (27 November 1918 – 22 December 1994) was an English footballer who played in the Football League as an outside right for Colchester United and Gillingham.

== Career ==
Born in Southend-on-Sea, Hillman began his career with Brighton & Hove Albion, although he failed to break into the first-team with the club, opting to return to Essex with Colchester United shortly after World War II in 1946. He would go on to make 107 Southern League appearances for the club and appeared on four occasions in the Football League after Colchester's election in 1950.

Hillman made his Southern League debut on 28 September 1946 in a 3–2 home victory against Worcester City and scored his first goal for the club in a 3–3 draw at Bath City on 2 November of the same year. He would go on to score 18 times in the Southern League, scoring his final goal in the second leg of the Southern League Cup final against Bath, resulting in a 3–4 defeat as Colchester won 6–4 on aggregate on 3 May 1950. He played his last game for the U's on 24 March 1951, a Third Division South 3–0 defeat by rivals Ipswich Town.

Gillingham signed Hillman in August 1951 from Colchester, making 21 appearances for the club, eventually losing his place to Bill Burtenshaw. He would later play for Hastings United and Ramsgate Athletic.

Dennis Hillman died aged 76 on 22 December 1994 in a road accident.
