= Arthur Turner (footballer, born 1921) =

English footballer (1921–2019)

Personal information
- Full name: Arthur Alexander Turner
- Date of birth: 22 January 1921
- Place of birth: Poplar, London, England
- Date of death: 28 January 2019 (aged 98)
- Position: Centre forward

Senior career*
Years	Team	Apps	(Gls)
1945–1946	Charlton Athletic	0	(0)
1947–1951	Colchester United	136	(90)
1951–????	Headington United		
- * Club domestic league appearances and goals

Arthur Alexander Turner (22 January 1921 – 25 January 2019) was an English amateur footballer who played at centre forward for Charlton Athletic in the 1946 FA Cup Final, thus becoming the only player to play in an FA Cup Final who never played a League game for his club, since the League's inception. He went on to have a league career at Colchester United.

== Career ==
=== Charlton Athletic ===
Following the cessation of the Second World War, there was no League football in 1945–46. The FA Cup was the main competition to be played this season; to make up for the lack of quality matches, all FA Cup rounds from round one up to and including the quarter-finals were made two-legged ties (rather than the traditional single matches) with the aggregate score determining who went through to the next round.

Poplar born Turner was a 22-year-old RAF officer who played part-time for Charlton Athletic, making a total of nine appearances in Charlton's run to the final, in which they played ten matches. After easy victories over Wolverhampton Wanderers, Preston North End (against whom Turner scored three goals in the two legs) and Brentford (another three goals), Charlton met Bolton Wanderers in the semi-final. Bolton were still suffering from the after-effects of the Burnden Park disaster in which 33 spectators were killed as a result of overcrowding. Charlton won the semi-final to set up a Cup Final against Derby County. Turner played no significant part in the final itself, whereas his (unrelated) namesake, Bert Turner, scored for both sides, conceding an own goal on 85 minutes, which he cancelled out from a free-kick a minute later.

=== Colchester United ===
In 1947, Turner was signed for Colchester United by manager Ted Fenton who was endeavouring to build a side capable of obtaining election from the Southern League into the Football League. Success took some time to arrive, and it was not until 1950 that Colchester (then managed by Jimmy Allen) finally achieved their dream, when they were one of two clubs elected to join an expanded Football League Third Division South.

Turner scored Colchester's first Football League goal at Layer Road, when he struck five minutes into a 4–1 win against Swindon Town on 31 August 1950. Turner made 36 appearances in Colchester's inaugural Football League season, scoring twelve goals, but injury restricted him to only nine further appearances, and he retired from football in the summer of 1951, although he did subsequently return to the Southern League with Headington United.

== Honours ==
Charlton Athletic

- FA Cup runner-up: 1945–46

Colchester United

- Southern League runner-up: 1949–50
- Southern League Cup: 1949–50; runner-up: 1947–48, 1948–49
