= Digger Kettle =

English footballer

Personal information
- Full name: Albert Henry Kettle
- Date of birth: 3 June 1922
- Place of birth: Colchester, England
- Date of death: 1 March 1999 (aged 76)
- Place of death: Fordham, England
- Position: Defender

Youth career
- Stanway Rovers
- Chapel and Wakes Colne
- Arclight Sports

Senior career*
Years	Team	Apps	(Gls)
1946–1955	Colchester United	145	(2)
1955–1957	Sudbury Town		
- Woods Athletic
- * Club domestic league appearances and goals

Albert Henry "Digger" Kettle (3 June 1922 – 1 March 1999) was an English footballer who played for Colchester United.

== Career ==
Born in Colchester, Kettle served in the Royal Air Force in Rhodesia and Italy during World War II. After playing for Stanway Rovers, Chapel and Wakes Colne and Arclight Sports as a teenager, he signed for Colchester United in 1946. Remaining part-time, he played as a full-back for Colchester in the Southern League and Football League whilst continuing to work for Woods, a fan manufacturer in Colchester.

After 23 appearances in the Football League, Kettle signed for Sudbury Town in 1955. After two seasons with Sudbury he signed for Woods Athletic, where he ended his playing career.

He died in 1999.

== Honours ==
=== Club ===
Colchester United

- Southern League runner-up: 1949–50
- Southern League Cup winner: 1949–50
- Southern League Cup runner-up: 1947–48, 1948–49
