= Ted Fenton =

English footballer (1914–1992)

Personal information
- Full name: Edward Benjamin Ambrose Fenton
- Date of birth: 7 November 1914
- Place of birth: Forest Gate, Essex, England
- Date of death: 12 July 1992 (aged 77)
- Place of death: England
- Height: 5 ft 9 in (1.75 m)
- Position: Wing-half

Senior career*
Years	Team	Apps	(Gls)
1932–1946	West Ham United	166	(18)
1946–1948	Colchester United		

Managerial career
- 1946–1948: Colchester United
- 1950–1961: West Ham United
- 1961–1965: Southend United
- * Club domestic league appearances and goals

Edward Benjamin Ambrose Fenton (7 November 1914 – 12 July 1992) was an English football player and manager. A wing-half, he spent almost his entire playing career at West Ham United and went on to manage the club between 1950 and 1961.

== Playing career ==
=== West Ham United ===
A prolific goal scorer as a schoolboy Fenton joined West Ham schoolboys eleven and won an England schoolboys eleven cap against Scotland, at Ibrox Park, in 1929. He made his West Ham debut in 1932 and played regularly until the outbreak of World War II. He joined the Army and served as a PT instructor in North Africa and Burma. Mainly as a wing half, but also as a utility player, Fenton made 179 appearances and scored 19 goals in first class games for the Hammers. He also made 204 appearances and scored 44 goals during World War II fixtures.

== Managerial career ==
=== Colchester United ===
At the end of the war Fenton went on to become player-manager at Southern League team Colchester United.

=== West Ham United ===
He returned to Upton Park in 1948 to become assistant manager to Charlie Paynter before becoming manager of West Ham in 1950. Fenton's greatest achievement was in winning The Hammers the Division Two championship in the 1957–58 season and thereby securing the club top flight football for the first time since 1932. The 1957–58 and 1958–59 seasons saw The Hammers achieve two goalscoring records; 1957–58 101 league goals in a season and 1958–59, 59 home league goals in a season which was even more remarkable being the season following promotion to Division One.

During his time Fenton was responsible for establishing "The Academy" and the development of youth teams that reached the F.A. Youth Cup Final twice in three Years over the period 1956–59. With the help of chairman Reg Pratt he was also responsible for encouraging as many players as possible in taking their FA Coaching Badges to ensure the players had something to fall back on when their playing days were over. Fenton's departure from West Ham in March 1961 has never been fully explained by the club. Under strain and on sick-leave and with West Ham's league position suffering he left the club under circumstances which both he and the club decided would remain confidential. He was succeeded as manager in 1961 by Ron Greenwood.

Seven of the West Ham 1964 FA Cup winning team had either been signed by Ted Fenton from other clubs, or had worked their way up from the Academy during his time as manager.

=== Southend United ===
Following his exit from West Ham, Fenton had four undistinguished years as manager of Southend United before his dismissal in May 1965. He never returned to football following his sacking by Southend.

== Outside football ==
His brother Benny Fenton was also a West Ham United player and later managed Millwall.

On 4 July 1992, he was injured in a car crash in Leicestershire, and died in hospital seven days later from his injuries.

== Managerial statistics ==
Team	From	To	Record				
Team	From	To	P	W	D	L	Win %
Colchester United	15 April 1946	31 May 1948	88	48	17	23	54.5
