= List of Colchester United F.C. players (25–99 appearances) =

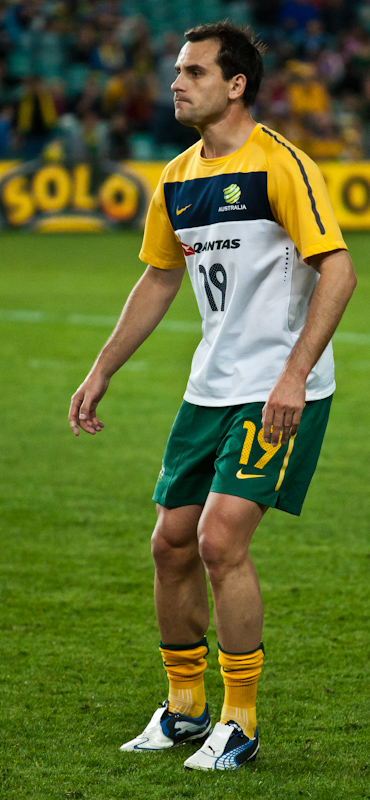
Richard Garcia, the only Colchester United player to make exactly 99 appearances in all competitions.

Colchester United Football Club is an English football club based in Colchester, Essex. Formed in 1937, the club competed in the Southern Football League from their foundation until 1950, when they were elected to the Football League. The club spent eleven years in the Third Division South and Third Division following the league's reorganisation in 1958, with a best finish of third place in 1957, one point behind rivals Ipswich Town and Torquay United. Colchester suffered their first relegation in 1961 as they finished 23rd in the Third Division, but spent just one season in the Fourth Division as they were promoted in second position, behind Millwall by just one point. This trend of relegation followed by promotion continued over the next few decades, before the club were eventually relegated from the Football League to the Conference in 1990.

Player-manager Roy McDonough guided the club back to the Football League in 1992, winning the non-league double of the Conference title and the FA Trophy. The club then won promotion to the Second Division in 1998 with a 1–0 Third Division play-off final win at Wembley against Torquay United. The club were again promoted in the 2005–06 season under the stewardship of Phil Parkinson, gaining the opportunity to play second tier football for the first time in their history. After two seasons in the Championship, Colchester were relegated back to League One. Colchester were relegated to the fourth tier for the first time in 18-years at the end of the 2015–16 season.

Colchester United's first team have competed in a number of professional competitions, and all players who have played between 25 and 99 of these matches, either as a member of the starting line-up or as a substitute, are listed below. Each player's details include the duration of his Colchester United career, his usual playing position while employed by the club, the number of matches started, the number of substitute appearances and total number of appearances, their total goals scored and total numbers of yellow and red cards collected. The players are sorted by total number of appearances, then by number of starts, then by player name in alphabetical order.

== Introduction ==
Over 200 players have made between 25 and 99 appearances in all competitions for Colchester United. Richard Garcia is the only player to have made exactly 99 appearances during his Colchester United career. Five of the players featured on this list would either go on to manage the club or were player-manager. These include Syd Fieldus, Ted Fenton, Allan Hunter, Ian Atkins and Geraint Williams.

Five players who made between 25 and 99 Colchester United appearances have also been inducted into the club's Hall of Fame. All of these players were in the starting line-up when Colchester beat Leeds United 3–2 in the FA Cup fifth round in 1971, and were duly inducted into the Hall of Fame in 2009 alongside the six other players who played in that game. The five players include Ray Crawford, John Gilchrist, John Kurila, Brian Lewis and Dave Simmons.

== Key ==
Player

- Players highlighted in yellow are registered Colchester United players for the 2016–17 season.
- Players marked in italics were on loan from another club for the duration of their Colchester United career. The loaning club(s) are noted in the reference column.

Positions key
Pre-1960s		1960s–	
GK	Goalkeeper		
FB	Full back	DF	Defender
HB	Half-back	MF	Midfielder
FW	Forward		
U	Utility player		

Position

- Playing positions are listed according to the tactical formations that were employed at the time. The change in the names of defensive and midfield positions reflects the tactical evolution that occurred from the 1960s onwards.

Club career

- Club career is defined as the first and last calendar years in which the player appeared for the club in any of the competitions listed below.

Total starts, Total subs, Total apps, Total goals, Total yellow cards and Total red cards

- Total starts, total subs and total goals are matches a player has started, been brought on as a substitute and the combined total of these figures, the total number of goals scored, and the total number of yellow and red cards received in the following competitions; Southern League, Southern League Mid-Week Section, Southern League Cup, English Football League (including play-offs), Conference, FA Cup, EFL Cup, Associate Members' Cup/Football League Trophy/EFL Trophy, FA Trophy, Bob Lord Trophy and the Watney Cup.

== Players with 25 to 99 appearances ==
As of match played 26 November 2021

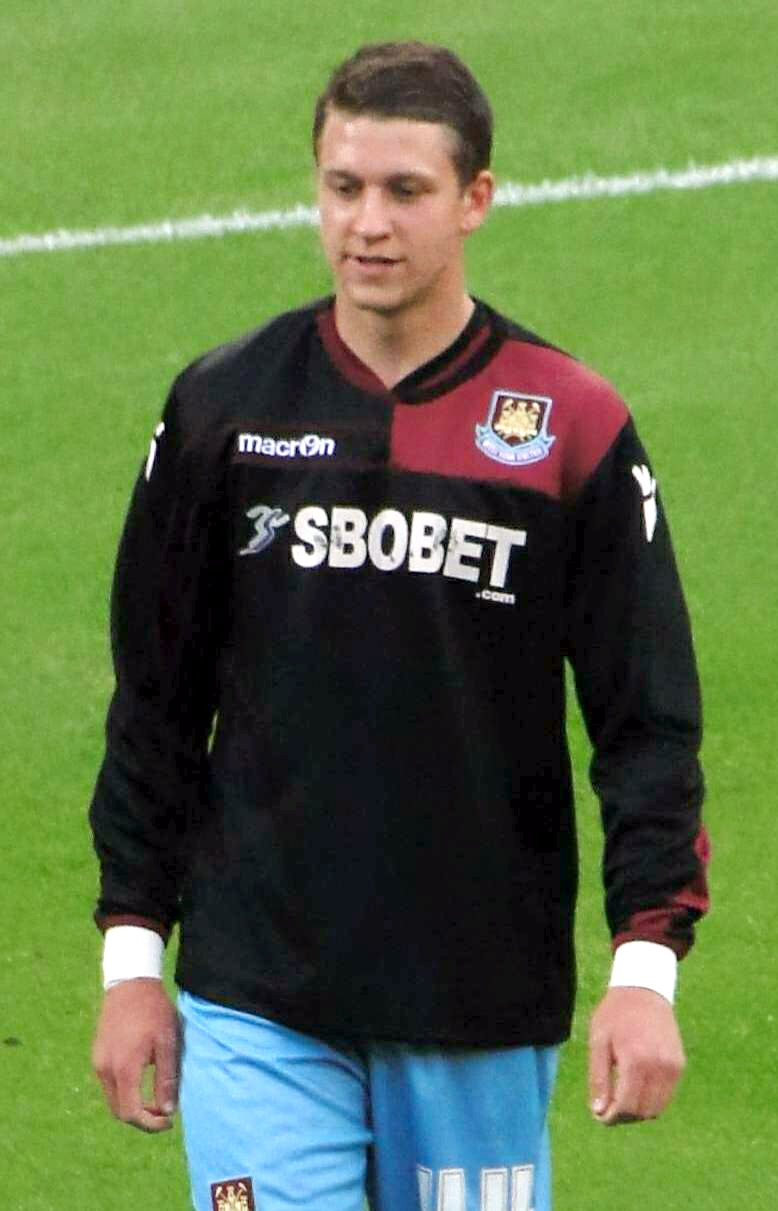
George Moncur scored 23 goals in 97 appearances for Colchester from 2014 to 2016.

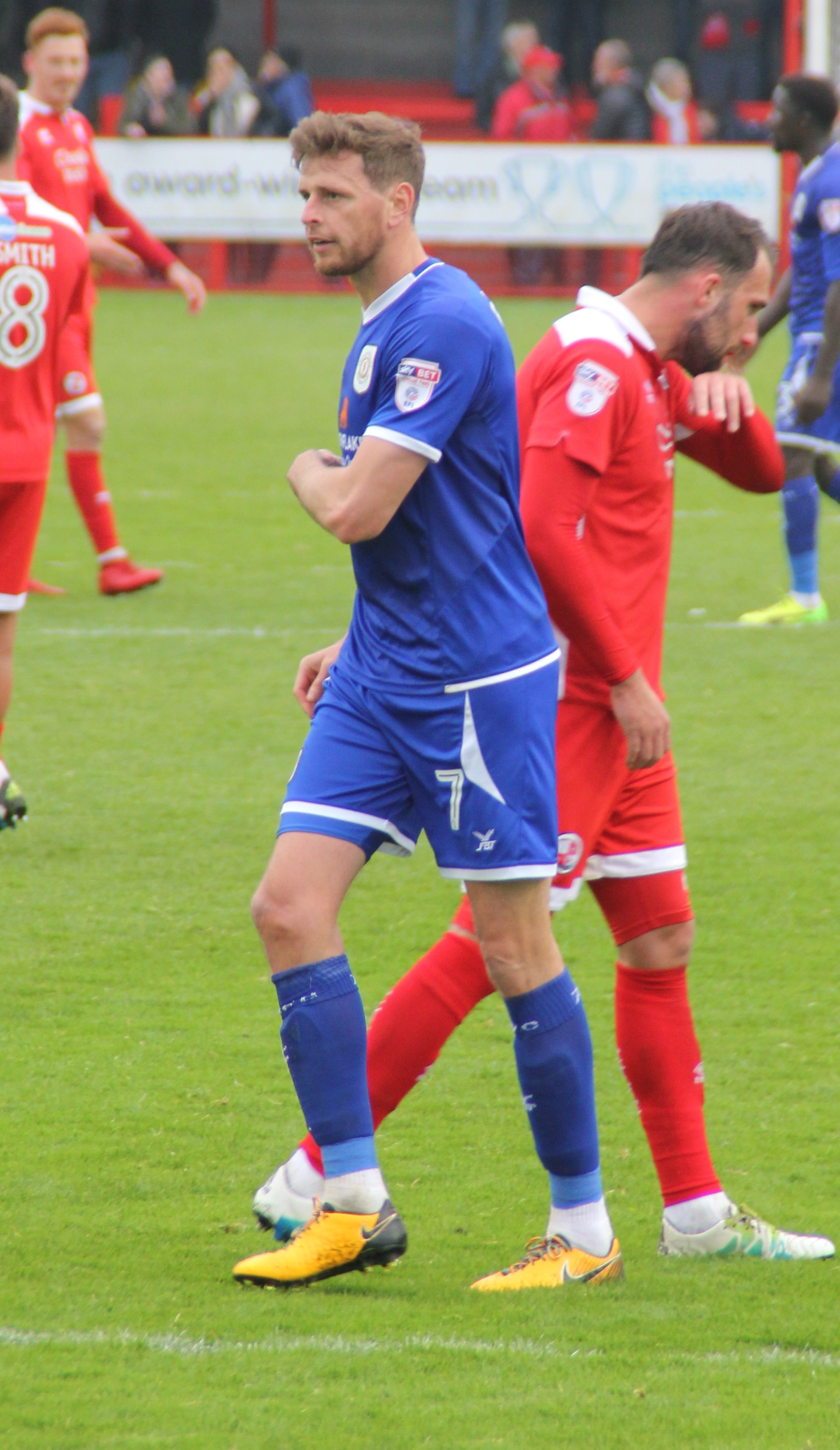
Chris Porter scored 30 goals in 95 appearances for the U's between 2015 and 2017.

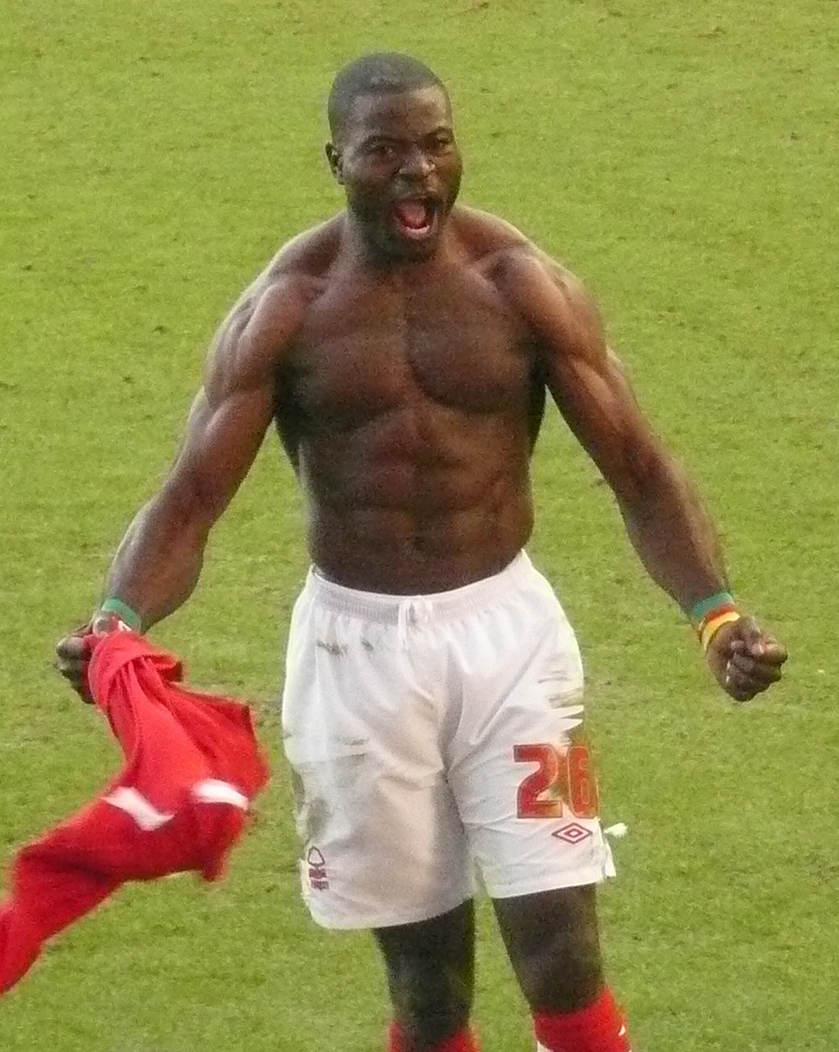
George Elokobi made 94 appearances for Colchester over two spells from 2005 to 2008, and 2015 to 2017.

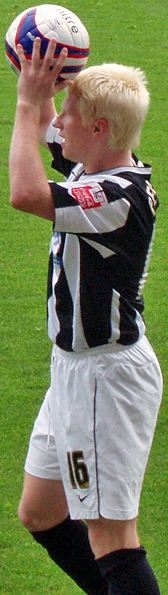
David Perkins made 91 Colchester United appearances between 2008 and 2011.

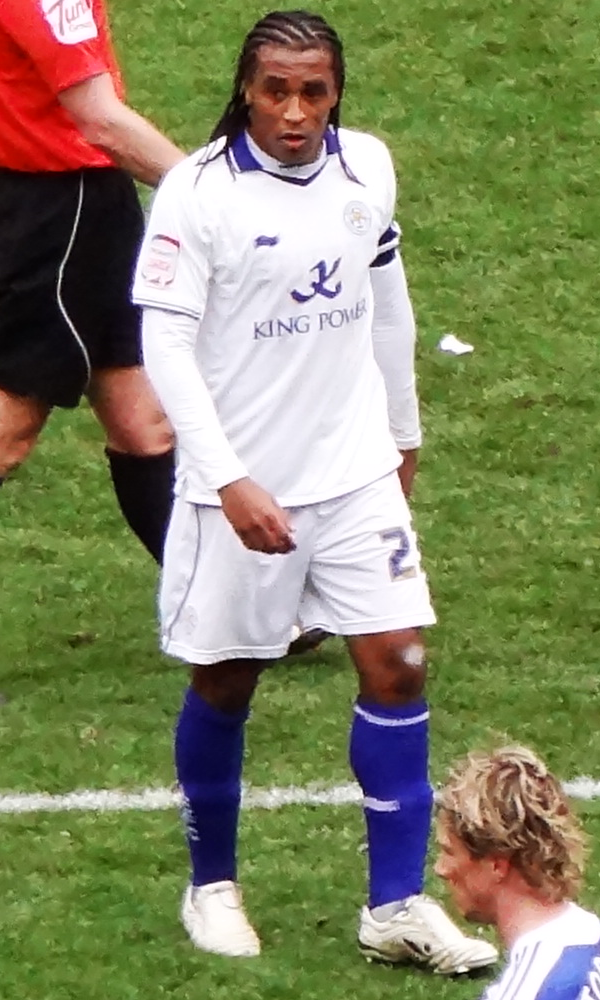
Neil Danns scored 28 goals in 87 appearances for Colchester United over two spells between 2004 and 2006, and made the 2005–06 PFA Team of the Year.

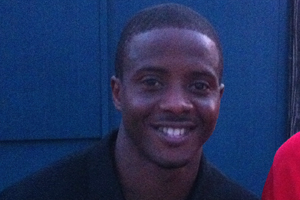
Kevin Lisbie scored 30 goals in 86 appearances for Colchester United over two separate seasons with the club, ending the season as the club's top scorer on both occasions.

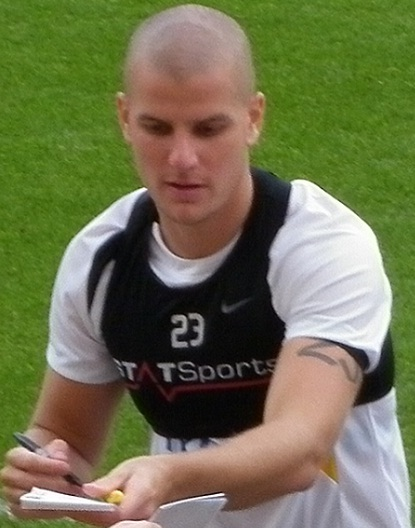
Marc Tierney made 85 Colchester appearances between 2008 and 2010, including appearances on loan from Shrewsbury Town

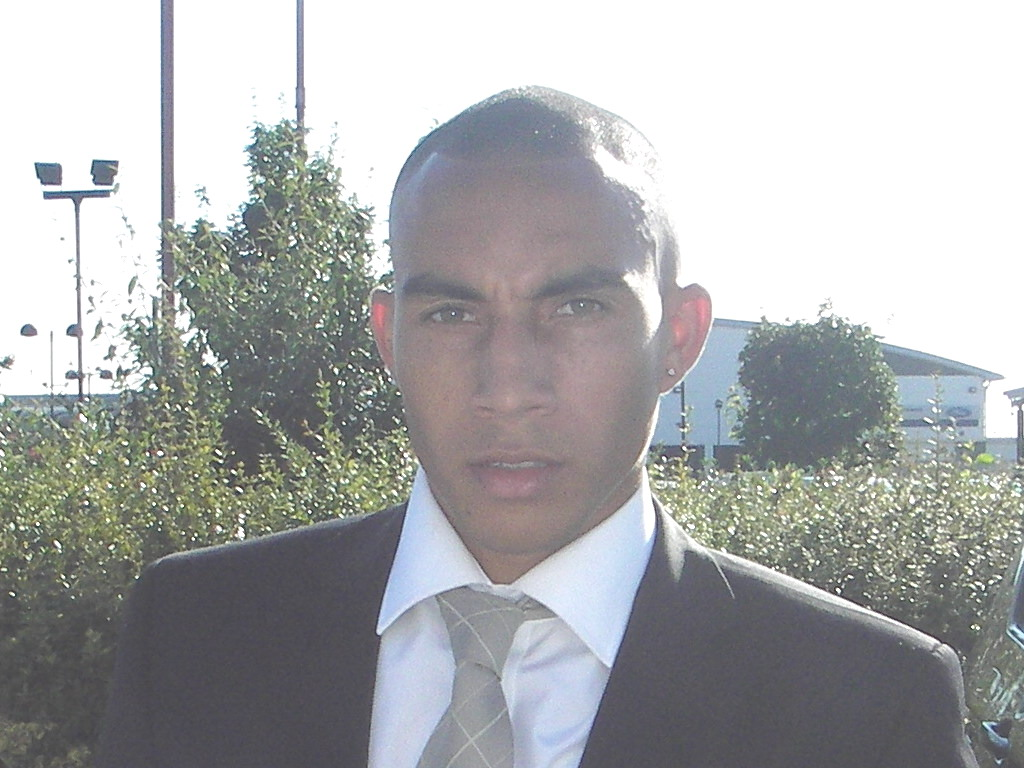
Craig Fagan was Colchester's leading goalscorer with 14 goals in the 2004–05 season, scoring 24 goals in 82 appearances in total.

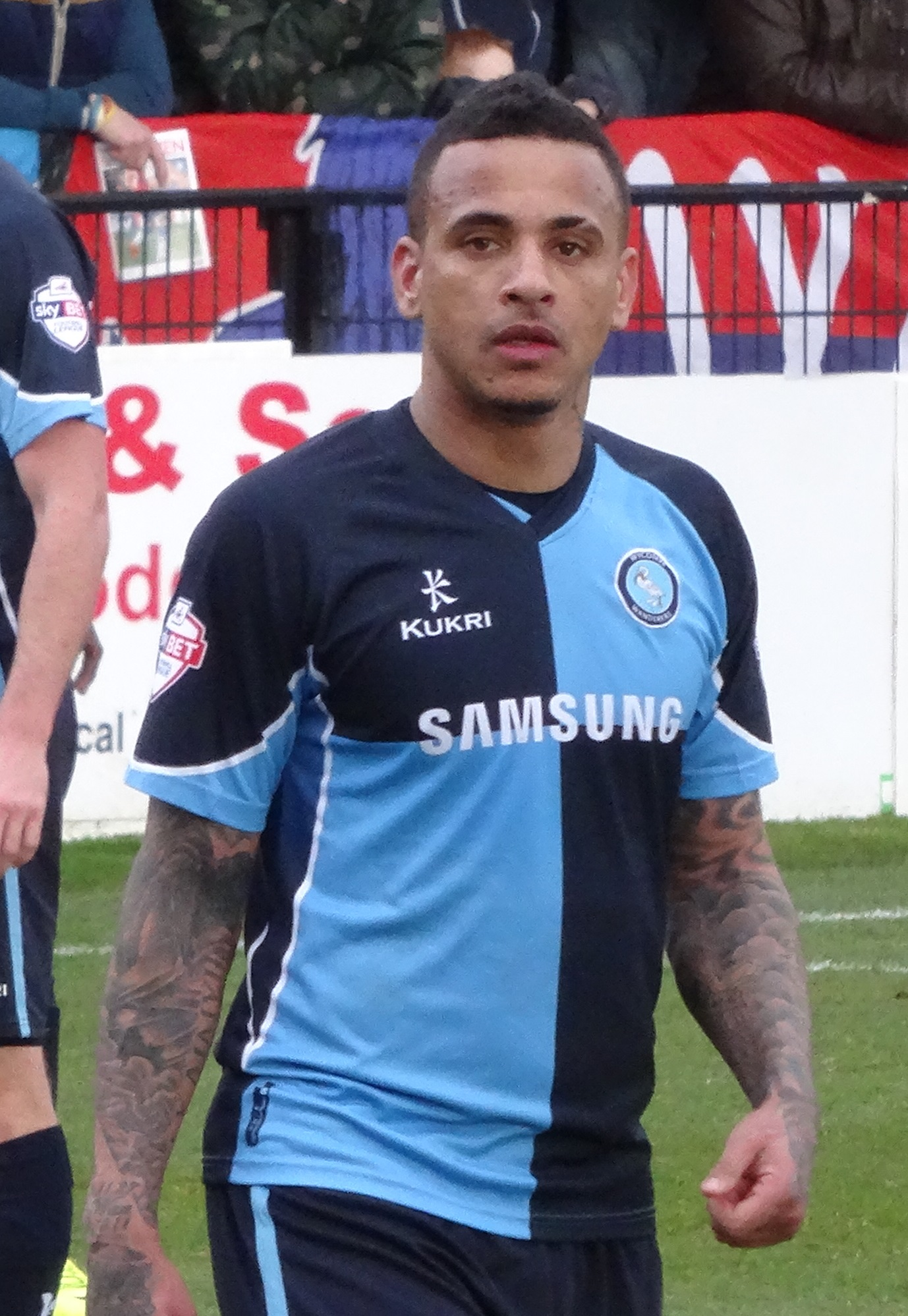
Dean Morgan, a product of the Colchester United academy, made 77 first-team appearances for the U's, with 25 starts, 52 substitute appearances and scoring six goals between 2000 and 2003.

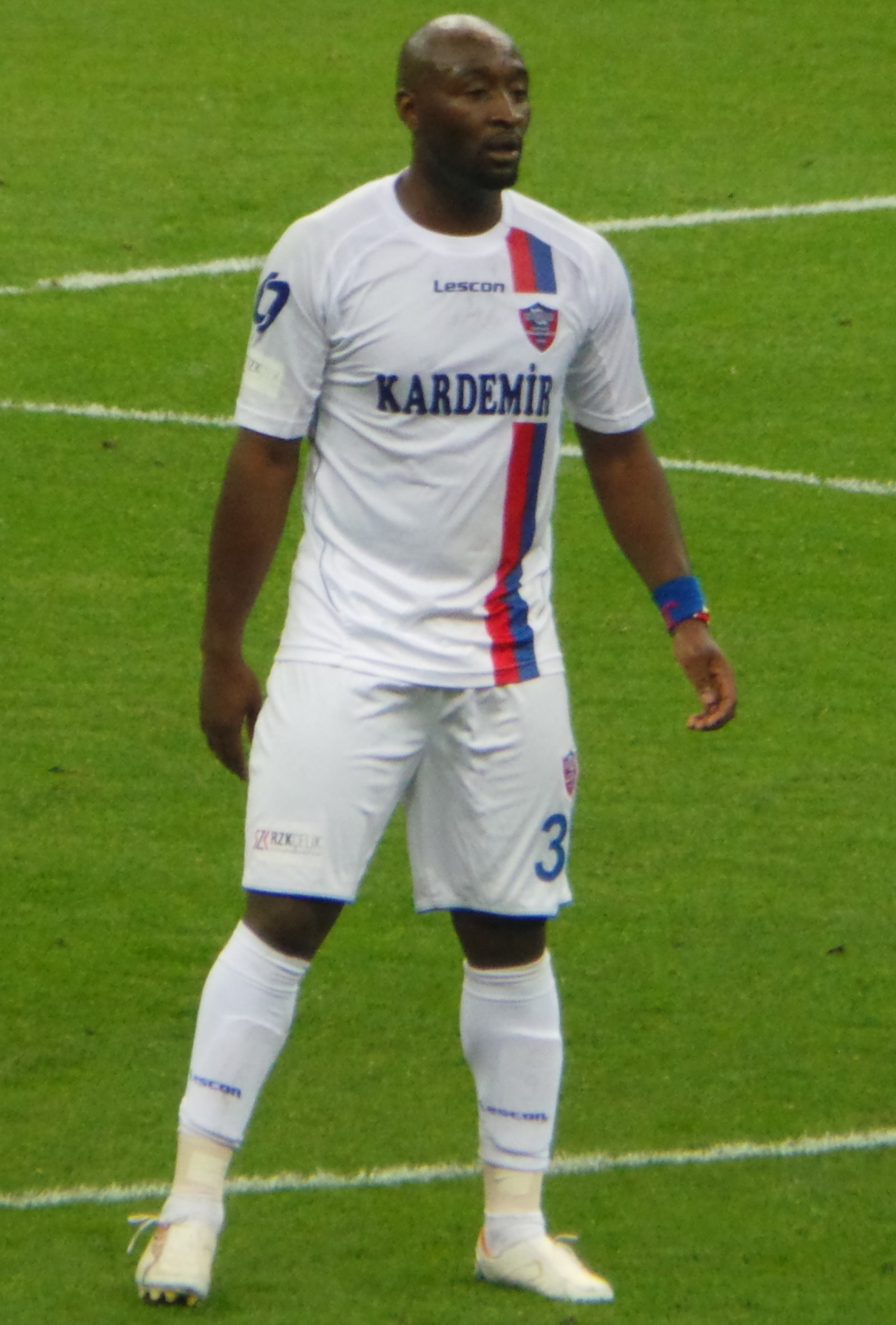
Lomana LuaLua scored 20 goals in 67 appearances for Colchester, earning him a move to Premier League club Newcastle United in 2000.

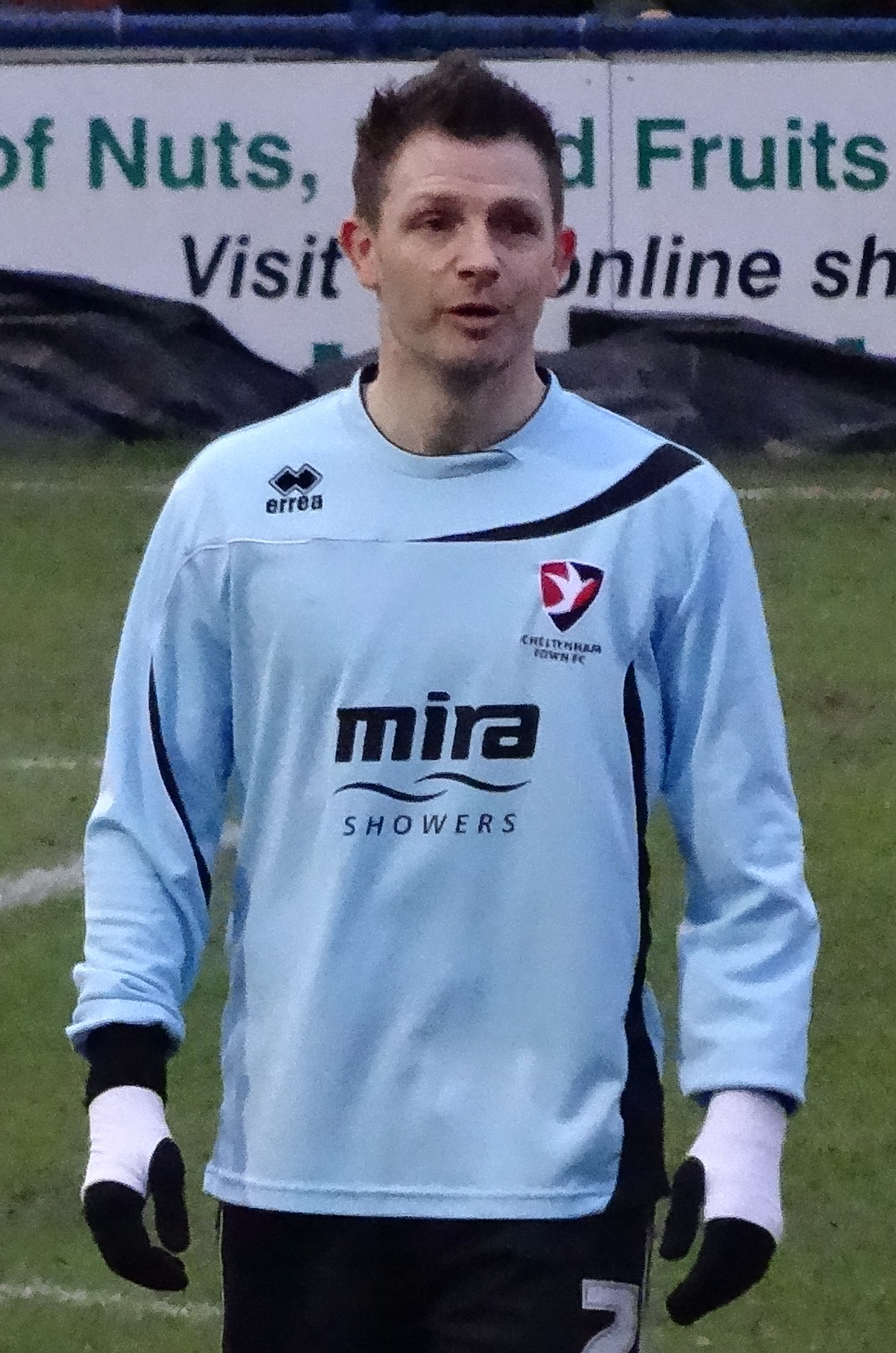
Jamie Cureton was the Championship top scorer in 2006–07 with 23 goals.

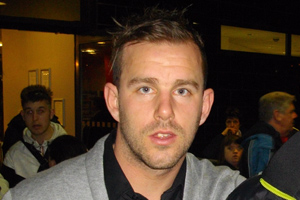
Rowan Vine scored 12 goals in 49 appearances during the 2003–04 season on loan from Portsmouth.

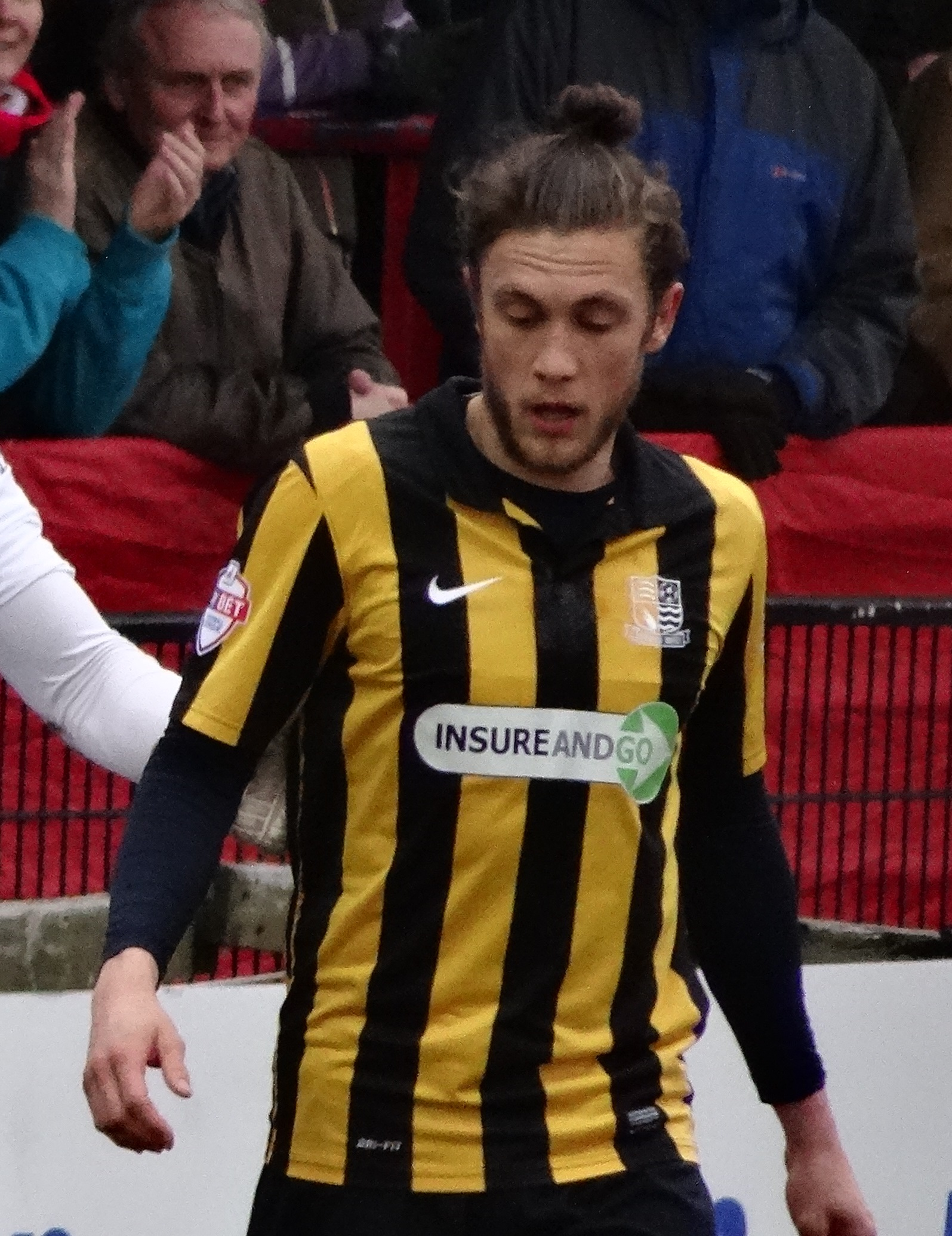
Ben Coker made his professional debut for Colchester in 2011, and made 45 first team appearances between 2011 and 2012.

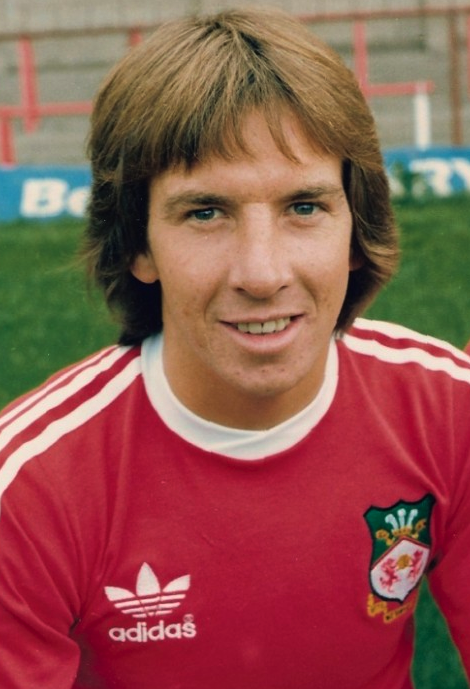
John Lyons scored 13 goals in 40 games for Colchester before he committed suicide at his Layer de la Haye home in 1982.

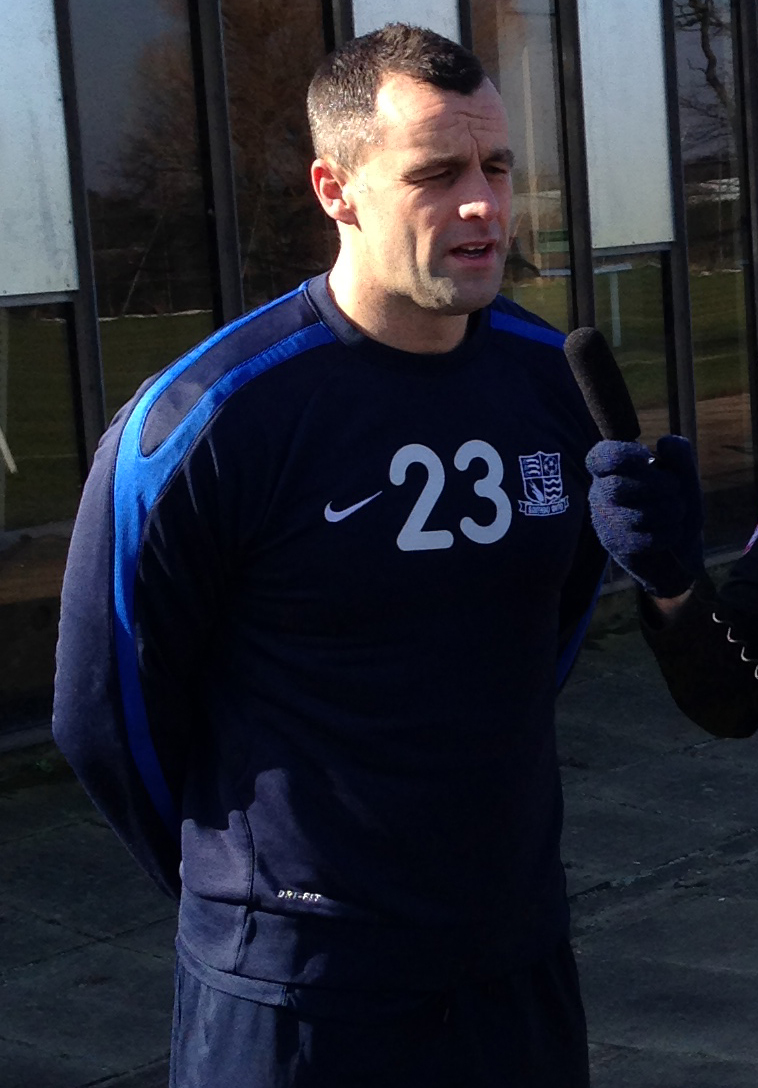
Chris Barker made 39 appearances on loan from Cardiff City in the 2006–07 season.

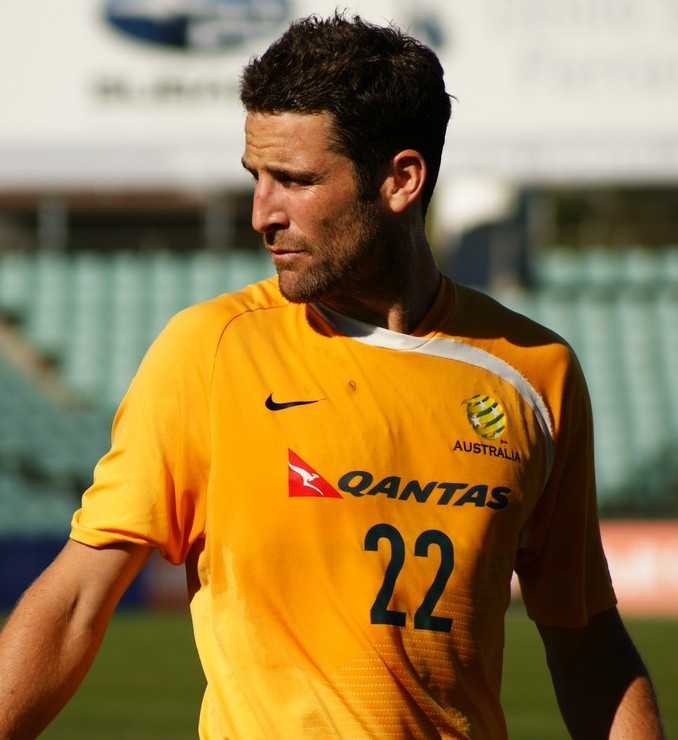
Australia international Chris Coyne briefly became Colchester's most expensive player when they paid Luton Town £350,000 for him in January 2008.

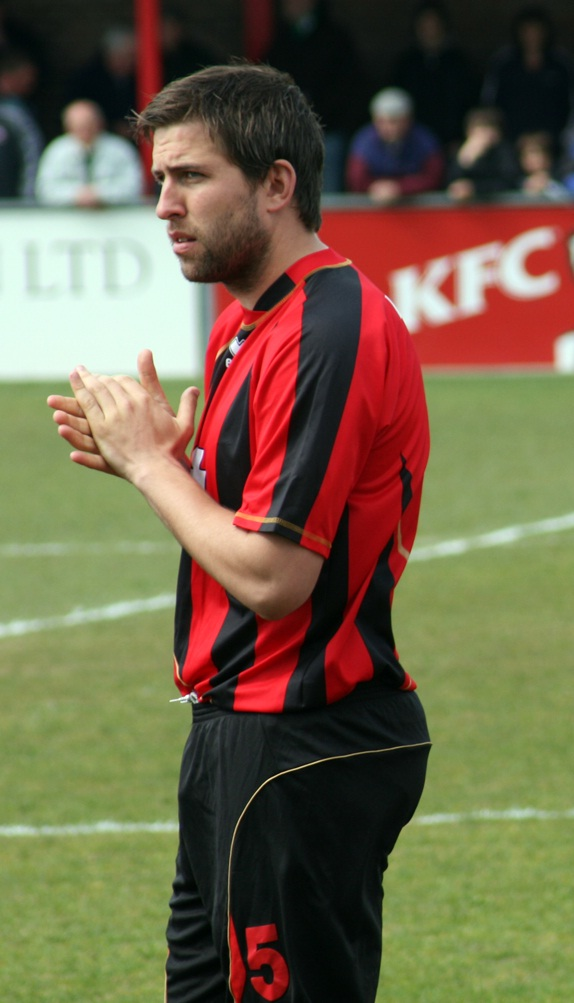
Adam Virgo made 37 appearances on loan from Celtic in the 2007–08 season.

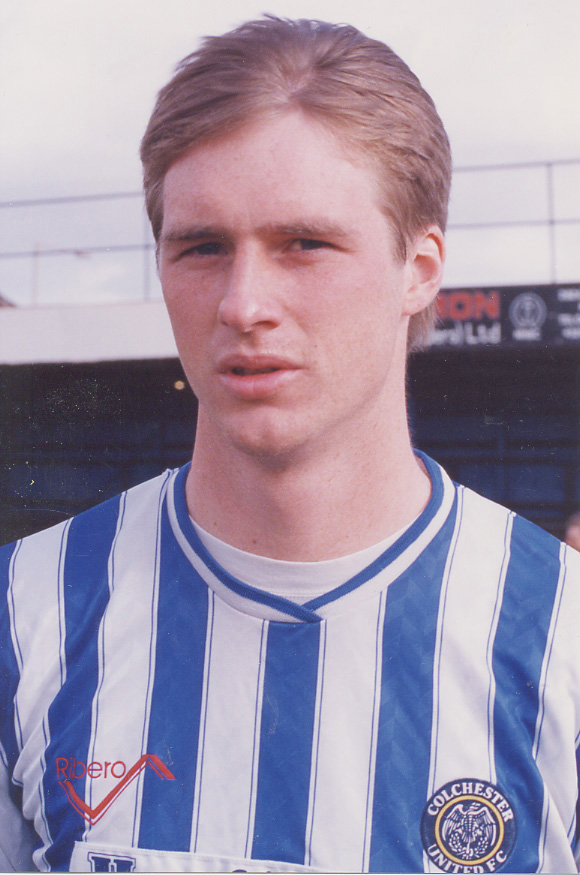
Mike Masters became the first American to score at Wembley when Colchester defeated Witton Albion in the 1992 FA Trophy final.

Player	Position	Club career	Total starts	Total subs	Total apps	Total goals	Total (yellow card)	Total (red card)	Ref
(Australia) Richard Garcia	MF	2004–2007	76	23	99	21	8	0	
(England) Paul Hinshelwood	FB	1986–1988	98	0	98	6	6	0	
(Wales) Arthur Pritchard	FW	1937–1939	98	0	98	74	0	0	
(Scotland) Alec Cheyne	FW	1937–1939	97	0	97	59	0	0	
(England) George Moncur	MF	2014 (Note: On loan from West Ham United); 2014–2016	85	12	97	23	3	0	
(England) Ben Stevenson	MF	2018 (Note: On loan from Wolverhampton Wanderers); 2019–2021	80	17	97	6	15	0	
(England) Mark Sale	FW	1997–1999	84	12	96	13	15	0	
(England) Luke Norris	FW	2018–2020	57	39	96	23	9	0	
(England) Jeff Hull	MF	1982–1985	93	2	95	10	2	0	
(England) Chris Porter	FW	2015–2017	80	15	95	30	2	0	
(France) Mikael Mandron	FW	2017–2019	66	29	95	12	14	1	
(England) Brian Garvey	DF	1970–1972	90	4	94	2	2	0	
(Cameroon) George Elokobi	FB	2005–2008; 2015–2017	87	7	94	6	12	1	
(England) Brennan Dickenson	FW	2016–2019	65	28	93	15	7	0	
(England) Dale Tempest	FW	1987–1989	83	9	92	22	1	0	
(England) Noel Parkinson	MF	1984–1986	89	2	91	13	4	0	
(England) David Perkins	MF	2008–2011	80	11	91	9	7	1	
(England) Mario Walsh	FW	1987–1989; 1990–1991	77	13	90	35	0	1	
(England) Johnny Martin	FW	1966–1969	88	1	89	11	0	0	
(Wales) Stuart Morgan	DF	1972–1975	87	2	89	10	2	3	
(England) Harry Pell	MF	2018–2021	86	3	89	13	24	1	
(England) Stephen Grenfell	FB	1986 (Note: On loan from Tottenham Hotspur); 1986–1988	84	4	88	2	4	0	
(Montserrat) Brandon Comley	MF	2017–2018 (Note: On loan from Queens Park Rangers); 2018–2020	69	19	88	3	13	0	
(England) Neil Danns	MF	2004 (Note: On loan from Blackburn Rovers); 2004–2006	82	5	87	28	19	0	
(Guyana) Callum Harriott	FW	2015 (Note: On loan from Charlton Athletic); 2019–2021	77	10	87	19	16	0	
(England) Stan Foxall	FW	1948–1950	86	0	86	16	0	0	
(England) Ken Jones	MF	1969–1972	81	5	86	27	1	0	
(Jamaica) Kevin Lisbie	FW	2007–2008; 2009–2010 (Note: On loan from Ipswich Town)	77	9	86	30	12	1	
(Scotland) John Docherty	HB	1963–1965	85	0	85	2	0	0	
(England) Marc Tierney	FB	2008 (Note: On loan from Shrewsbury Town); 2009–2010	83	2	85	1	13	1	
(Zimbabwe) Macauley Bonne	FW	2013–2017	25	60	85	15	4	0	
(England) Jason Cook	MF	1991–1993	76	8	84	5	0	0	
(South Africa) Sandy Kennon	GK	1965–1967	83	0	83	0	0	0	
(England) George Wallis	FW	1938–1939	83	0	83	30	0	1	
(Northern Ireland) Colin Hill	DF	1987–1989	76	6	82	2	0	0	
(England) Craig Fagan	FW	2003–2004 (Note: On loan from Birmingham City); 2004–2005	74	8	82	24	25	3	
(England) Roy McCrohan	HB	1962–1964	81	0	81	5	0	0	
(England) Steve Ball	MF	1990; 1992–1996	66	15	81	12	0	0	
(England) Ashley Vincent	FW	2009 (Note: On loan from Cheltenham Town); 2009–2012	61	20	81	10	7	0	
(England) Mark Radford	MF	1987–1991	56	25	81	5	0	0	
(Scotland) Jim Oliver	FW	1968–1970	69	11	80	11	2	0	
(England) Barry Dominey	DF	1974–1977	65	15	80	5	0	0	
(England) Martin Grainger	FB	1989–1993	61	18	79	8	1	1	
(England) Winston White	FW	1987–1988	77	1	78	12	1	1	
(England) Dennis Longhorn	MF	1980–1983	67	11	78	0	0	0	
(England) Brian Wood	DF	1968 (Note: On loan from Orient); 1968–1970	77	0	77	2	0	0	
(England) Tony Dennis	MF	1994–1996	64	13	77	5	1	1	
(Wales) Gareth Williams	FW	2003 (Note: On loan from Crystal Palace); 2004; 2004–2006	37	40	77	15	0	0	
(Montserrat) Dean Morgan	FW	2000–2003	25	52	77	6	1	0	
(Scotland) Andy Brown	FW	1947–1949	76	0	76	3	0	0	
(England) Gus Caesar	DF	1994–1996	76	0	76	3	0	0	
(England) Jabo Ibehre	FW	2012 (Note: On loan from Milton Keynes Dons); 2013–2015	70	6	76	17	7	1	
(England) Richard Brindley	DF	2015 (Note: On loan from Rotherham United); 2015–	69	7	76	2	4	0	
(England) Stuart Hicks	DF	1988–1990	69	7	76	1	2	0	
(England) Noah Chilvers	AM	2019–	59	17	76	6	9	0	
(Republic of Ireland) John-Joe O'Toole	MF	2009 (Note: On loan from Watford); 2010–2013	50	26	76	3	14	1	
(Ghana) Kwame Poku	MF	2019–2021	61	14	75	6	2	0	
(Wales) Bill Bower	FB	1945–1949	74	0	74	1	0	0	
(England) Len Jones	HB	1950–1953	74	0	74	4	0	0	
(England) Steve Brown	FW	1993–1995	68	6	74	21	0	0	
(England) Phil Rookes	FB	1951–1953	73	0	73	0	0	0	
(England) John McLaughlin	FB	1972–1973	72	1	73	2	0	0	
(England) Danny Light	FW	1968–1970	71	2	73	16	0	0	
(Jamaica) Marcus Bean	MF	2012–2014	63	10	73	5	18	0	
(England) Scott Vernon	FW	2006 (Note: On loan from Blackpool); 2008–2010	37	36	73	13	0	0	
(England) John Reeves	MF	1985–1988	66	6	72	7	4	1	
(England) Dave Bickles	DF	1968–1970	71	0	71	3	0	0	
(England) Dave Simmons	FB	1970–1973	65	6	71	19	0	0	
(England) Tommy English	FW	1985; 1985–1987; 1989–1990	55	16	71	25	1	1	
(Republic of Ireland) Clinton Morrison	FW	2012–2014	39	32	71	4	6	1	
(England) Harry Wright	GK	1946–1949	70	0	70	0	0	0	
(England) Mark Cousins	GK	2007–2014	67	3	70	0	0	0	
(England) Robert Morris	HB	1938–1939	69	0	69	5	0	0	
(New Zealand) Tommy Smith	CB	2011; 2020–	65	3	69	2	9	0	
(Wales) George Crisp	FW	1937–1939	68	0	68	25	0	0	
(England) Keith Rutter	DF	1963–1964	68	0	68	0	0	0	
(England) Alf Worton	FB	1938–1939	68	0	68	0	0	0	
(England) Craig Eastmond	MF	2012 (Note: On loan from Arsenal); 2013–2014	56	12	68	7	16	0	
(England) Terry Baker	DF	1986–1988	67	0	67	3	4	0	
(England) Bert Barlow	FW	1952–1954	67	0	67	17	0	0	
(England) Neale Marmon	DF	1990–1991	65	2	67	9	2	0	
(Democratic Republic of the Congo) Lomana LuaLua	FW	1999–2000	43	24	67	20	6	1	
(England) Joe Birch	FB	1938–1939	66	0	66	3	0	0	
(England) Ted Fenton	HB	1946–1948	66	0	66	7	1	0	
(England) Shaun Elliott	DF	1990–1992	56	10	66	1	1	1	
(Scotland) John Kurila	DF	1970–1971	65	0	65	4	3	0	
(England) Paul Reid	DF	2008–2011	61	4	65	1	9	0	
(England) Scott Stamps	FB	1997–1999	60	5	65	1	12	0	
(Guyana) Matthew Briggs	DF	2015 (Note: On loan from Millwall); 2015–2017	58	7	65	0	11	1	
(England) Simon Clark	DF	2000–2002	60	4	64	0	12	1	
(England) Paul Gibbs	FB	1995–1997	48	16	64	3	3	0	
(England) Kevin Rapley	FW	2001–2002	47	17	64	11	3	1	
(England) Steve Forbes	MF	1997–1999	42	22	64	5	10	0	
(England) Russell Blake	FW	1955–1961	63	0	63	8	0	0	
(England) Terry Price	FW	1967–1969	61	2	63	6	0	0	
(England) Dean Hammond	MF	2008–2009	57	6	63	5	9	0	
(Jamaica) Jevani Brown	AM	2019–2021	41	21	62	11	3	0	
(England) Ken Hodgson	FW	1966–1969	60	1	61	19	0	0	
(England) John Evans	FW	1957–1959	60	0	60	24	0	0	
(Wales) George Smith	HB	1937–1939	60	0	60	3	0	0	
(England) Alex Wynter	DF	2014; 2015–2017	49	11	60	1	7	0	
(England) Philip Ifil	FB	2008–2010	46	14	60	2	6	0	
(England) Brian Lewis	MF	1970–1972	59	0	59	27	2	0	
(England) Andy Woodman	GK	2000 (Note: On loan from Brentford); 2001–2002	59	0	59	0	2	0	
(England) Nick Chatterton	MF	1986–1988	56	3	59	10	0	0	
(England) Neil Gregory	FW	1998; 1998–1999	47	12	59	11	8	0	
(Wales) Lloyd James	MF	2010–2012	38	21	59	3	7	0	
(England) Jamie Guy	FW	2005–2009	4	55	59	3	3	0	
(England) Terry Dyson	FW	1968–1970	55	3	58	4	2	0	
(England) Micky Brown	FW	1968–1970	52	6	58	12	0	0	
(England) Les Taylor	MF	1989–1991	46	12	58	1	0	0	
(England) Russell Irving	FW	1984–1986	43	15	58	10	0	0	
(England) Cohen Bramall	LB	2019–2021	57	0	57	2	6	1	
(England) Eric Burgess	FB	1971–1972	55	2	57	9	0	0	
(England) Robbie Reinelt	FW	1995–1997	30	27	57	13	5	1	
(England) Ernie Adams	GK	1967–1968	56	0	56	0	0	0	
(England) Ray Crawford	FW	1970–1971	56	0	56	31	0	0	
(Wales) Mark Walton	GK	1987 (Note: On loan from Luton Town); 1987; 1987–1989	56	0	56	0	0	0	
(England) Barrie Aitchison	FW	1964–1966	55	1	56	7	0	0	
(England) Arthur Kaye	FW	1965–1967	55	1	56	2	0	0	
(England) Jamie Cureton	FW	2005 (Note: On loan from Swindon Town); 2006–2007	54	2	56	31	3	0	
(Scotland) John Gilchrist	FB	1970–1972	54	2	56	2	1	0	
(England) Wayne Andrews	FW	2003–2004	44	12	56	16	5	1	
(Republic of Ireland) Sean Murray	MF	2017–2018	37	19	56	3	3	1	
(England) Alex Smith	FB	1973–1974 (Note: On loan from Southend United); 1974–1975	55	0	55	1	1	0	
(England) Tony Hadley	DF	1983–1984	54	1	55	0	1	1	
(England) Ross Johnson	DF	2000 (Note: On loan from Brighton & Hove Albion); 2000–2002	50	5	55	1	3	0	
(England) Sanchez Watt	FW	2012; 2013–2015	45	10	55	10	11	1	
(England) Kevin McLeod	FW	2006–2008	37	18	55	7	5	0	
(England) Ronnie Dunn	GK	1937–1939	54	0	54	0	0	0	
(United States) Alexander Wood	FB	1937–1938	54	0	54	1	0	0	
(England) David Fox	MF	2009–2010; 2014–2015	50	4	54	5	2	0	
(England) Richie Griffiths	FB	1962–1964	53	0	53	0	0	0	
(Scotland) Tommy Millar	FB	1960–1962	53	0	53	4	0	0	
(Republic of Ireland) Owen Garvan	MF	2015–2017	49	4	53	2	8	0	
(Wales) Jimmy Baker	HB	1937–1939	52	0	52	3	0	0	
(England) Cliff Fairchild	FB	1937–1938	52	0	52	0	0	0	
(Scotland) Jimmy Lindsay	MF	1974–1975	52	0	52	7	0	0	
(England) David Raine	FB	1965–1967	48	4	52	0	0	0	
(England) David Wright	DF	2013–2014	46	6	52	1	2	0	
(England) Bill Layton	HB	1949–1951	51	0	51	8	0	0	
(England) Edgar Rumney	FB	1957–1964	51	0	51	1	0	0	
(England) Frank Stamper	HB	1947–1949	51	0	51	0	0	0	
(England) Miles Welch-Hayes	DF	2020–	44	7	51	1	8	0	
(England) Barry Smith	GK	1971–1973	50	0	50	0	0	0	
(England) Ray Whittaker	FW	1969–1971	46	4	50	7	0	0	
(Malta) Luke Gambin	WG	2019–2020	21	29	50	2	3	0	
(England) Ian Atkins	DF	1990–1991	49	0	49	8	1	0	
(England) Kurtis Guthrie	FW	2016–2019	43	6	49	13	7	0	
(England) Rowan Vine	FW	2003–2004 (Note: On loan from Portsmouth)	40	9	49	12	9	0	
(England) Billy Light	GK	1938–1945	48	0	48	0	0	0	
(England) Brendan Sarpong-Wiredu	MF	2019; 2021–	44	4	48	2	13	0	
(England) Ryan Clampin	LW/LB	2018–	42	6	48	2	6	0	
(England) John Cheesewright	GK	1994–1995	47	0	47	0	0	0	
(England) Len Astill	FW	1938–1939	46	0	46	24	0	0	
(Wales) Trevor Rowlands	FB	1951–1953	46	0	46	5	0	0	
(England) Barry Dyson	FW	1973–1975	43	2	45	7	1	0	
(England) Owen Simpson	FB	1968–1969	43	2	45	4	2	0	
(England) Joe Edwards	MF	2015–2016	42	3	45	2	9	1	
(England) Ben Coker	MF	2011–2012	39	6	45	1	5	0	
(Republic of Ireland) Dave Mooney	FW	2010–2011 (Note: On loan from Reading); 2011	42	2	44	14	6	1	
(England) Brian Abrey	HB	1961–1962	43	0	43	2	0	0	
(Wales) Geraint Williams	MF	1998–1999	42	1	43	0	2	0	
(England) Michael Cheetham	MF	1995–1996	39	4	43	4	0	0	
(England) Bob Hutchings	FW	1946–1947	42	0	42	1	0	0	
(England) John Laidlaw	FB	1959–1960	42	0	42	1	0	0	
(Scotland) George Ramage	GK	1963	42	0	42	0	0	0	
(England) John Mansfield	MF	1964–1968	36	6	42	3	0	0	
(Scotland) Robert Scott	FB	1989–1990	29	13	42	10	0	0	
(Scotland) Craig Slater	MF	2016–2017	27	15	42	3	3	0	
(England) Roy Massey	FW	1969–1970	35	6	41	15	0	0	
(England) Alan Buck	GK	1964–1968	40	0	40	0	0	0	
(England) Mike Foster	FW	1961–1962	40	0	40	8	0	0	
(Gibraltar) Tony Macedo	GK	1968 (Note: On loan from Fulham); 1968–1969	40	0	40	0	0	0	
(England) Ken Mayes	FW	1937–1938	40	0	40	0	0	0	
(England) Pat Woods	FB	1963–1964	40	0	40	0	0	0	
(Wales) John Lyons	FW	1982	38	2	40	13	0	0	
(England) Michael Rose	FB	2011–2013	38	2	40	3	4	0	
(England) Simon Lowe	FW	1986–1987 (Note: On loan from Hartlepool United); 1987	36	4	40	8	0	0	
(England) Tim Allpress	DF	1993–1995	29	11	40	0	0	0	
(England) Simon Hackney	FW	2009–2011	25	15	40	3	5	0	
(England) Chris Barker	FB	2006–2007 (Note: On loan from Cardiff City)	39	0	39	0	4	2	
(England) Albert Walker	FB	1946–1948	39	0	39	0	0	0	
(England) Phil Bloss	MF	1971–1973	35	4	39	2	0	0	
(England) Doug Beach	FB	1945–1946; 1949–1950	38	0	38	2	0	0	
(England) Frank Coombs	GK	1952–1954	38	0	38	0	0	0	
(England) Denis Maffey	FW	1948–1949	38	0	38	1	0	0	
(England) Eddie Smith	FW	1956–1957	38	0	38	13	0	0	
(England) Ken Whitehead	GK	1948–1949	38	0	38	0	0	0	
(Australia) Chris Coyne	DF	2008–2009	35	3	38	1	6	0	
(England) Kirk Game	DF	1985–1987	35	3	38	0	1	0	
(United States) Marcelle Bruce	FB	1989–1991	34	4	38	1	0	0	
(England) Russell Cotton	MF	1978–1982	34	4	38	1	0	0	
(England) Sean Clohessy	DF	2014–2015	35	2	37	0	2	0	
(England) Steve Hetzke	DF	1988–1989	35	2	37	3	0	1	
(Scotland) Adam Virgo	DF	2007–2008 (Note: On loan from Celtic)	31	6	37	1	6	0	
(England) Nicky Haydon	DF	1997–1999	20	17	37	2	5	0	
(England) Arthur Langley	FW	1964–1965	36	0	36	13	0	0	
(England) Trevor Morgan	FW	1989–1990	35	1	36	12	0	0	
(Dominica) Shamal George	GK	2020–	34	2	36	0	2	0	
(England) Kevin Bedford	FB	1988–1989	33	3	36	0	0	0	
(England) Alan Dickens	MF	1993–1994	32	4	36	3	0	0	
(England) Dominic Vose	MF	2013–2014	22	14	36	0	1	0	
(Northern Ireland) Adrian Coote	FW	2001–2003	12	24	36	4	5	0	
(England) Clive Stafford	FB	1989–1990	33	2	35	0	0	0	
(England) Ryan Dickson	FB	2013–2014	30	5	35	0	4	0	
(Scotland) Denny Johnstone	FW	2016–2017	20	15	35	2	1	0	
(United States) Mike Masters	FW	1990–1991; 1992	14	21	35	10	0	0	
(Republic of Ireland) Paddy Leonard	FW	1954–1955	34	0	34	5	0	0	
(England) Ted Phillips	FW	1965–1966	34	0	34	13	0	0	
(England) Simon Burman	MF	1985–1986	29	5	34	3	5	0	
(Jamaica) Theo Robinson	ST	2019–2020	20	14	34	12	1	1	
(England) Tarique Fosu	FW	2016–2017	14	20	34	6	5	0	
(Scotland) Jimmy Kirk	GK	1954–1955	32	0	32	0	0	0	
(Scotland) Bob Murray	FW	1939	32	0	32	6	0	0	
(Scotland) George Ritchie	HB	1937–1939	32	0	32	1	0	0	
(England) Tony Evans	MF	1978–1980	21	11	32	2	0	0	
(England) Bobby Noble	DF	1972–1973	29	2	31	0	1	0	
(England) Cameron James	DF	2016–2020	20	11	31	0	2	0	
(England) Bert Howe	FB	1969–1970	30	0	30	1	1	0	
(England) Alf Marshall	FB	1958–1961	30	0	30	0	0	0	
(England) Dillon Barnes	GK	2016–2019	29	1	30	0	1	1	
(England) Billy Gilbert	DF	1989–1990	29	1	30	0	0	0	
(Northern Ireland) Richard McKinney	GK	2002–2004	29	1	30	0	1	1	
(England) Dave Barnett	MF	1988–1989	27	3	30	0	1	2	
(England) Mark Yates	MF	1990–1991	26	4	30	6	0	0	
(England) Omar Sowunmi	CB	2019–2021	20	10	30	0	4	1	
(England) Dion Sembie-Ferris	FW	2015–2016	7	23	30	1	0	0	
(England) Roy Bicknell	DF	1952–1954	29	0	29	0	0	0	
(Wales) Tecwyn Jones	HB	1964–1965	29	0	29	0	0	0	
(Scotland) John McInally	GK	1972 (Note: On loan from Lincoln City); 1972–1973	29	0	29	0	0	0	
(England) Mick Ferguson	FW	1986	28	1	29	11	2	0	
(Republic of Ireland) Alan Maybury	FB	2008–2009	28	1	29	0	7	0	
(England) Jamie Moralee	FW	1999–2000	21	8	29	2	1	0	
(England) Lewis Kinsella	DF	2016–2017	20	9	29	0	8	0	
(England) Michael Folivi	FW	2020–2021	13	16	29	6	1	0	
(England) Jamie Cade	FW	2003–2005	11	18	29	0	0	0	
(England) Elliot Parish	GK	2015–2016	27	1	28	0	0	0	
(Republic of Ireland) Barry Conlon	FW	2000–2001 (Note: On loan from York City)	25	3	28	8	2	0	
(England) Sean Norman	MF	1986–1987	25	3	28	2	1	0	
(England) Chris Keeble	MF	2000–2003	14	14	28	2	1	0	
(England) Jimmy Jenkins	DF	1945–1946	27	0	27	0	0	0	
(England) Don Youngs	GK	1938–1939	27	0	27	0	0	0	
(Scotland) Tommy McKechnie	FW	1967–1968	26	1	27	6	0	0	
(England) Stephen Hunt	FB	2004–2005	20	7	27	1	2	1	
(England) Bill Barraclough	FW	1937–1938	26	0	26	4	0	2	
(Republic of Ireland) Rene Gilmartin	GK	2017–2019	26	0	26	0	0	0	
(England) Andy Myers	DF	2003	26	0	26	0	2	1	
(France) Fabrice Richard	FB	1999–2000	24	2	26	0	2	0	
(Northern Ireland) Allan Hunter	DF	1982	23	3	26	0	0	0	
(England) Bobby Mills	MF	1972–1974	20	6	26	0	1	0	
(Wales) Lee Beevers	DF	2009–2011	18	8	26	1	2	0	
(England) Tosin Olufemi	FB	2013–2015	16	10	26	0	2	0	
(England) Darren Ambrose	MF	2015–2016	14	12	26	4	2	0	
(England) Pat Connolly	FW	1964–1965	25	0	25	7	0	0	
(England) Brian Dobson	DF	1956–1959	25	0	25	0	0	0	
(England) Syd Fieldus	DF	1937–1947	25	0	25	3	0	0	
(Republic of Ireland) John Grace	GK	1989–1990	25	0	25	0	0	0	
(England) Doug Keene	HB	1953–1954	25	0	25	1	0	0	
(England) Alan Shires	FW	1966–1968	24	1	25	3	0	0	
(England) Stewart Bright	FB	1975–1976	23	2	25	0	0	0	
(England) Marvin Sordell	FW	2015–2016	22	3	25	6	1	0	
(England) Paris Cowan-Hall	WG	2019–2021	6	19	25	2	2	0	
