= 1938–39 Colchester United F.C. season =

Colchester United
1938–39 season
- Chairman: Maurice Pye
- Manager: Ted Davis
- Stadium: Layer Road
- Southern League: Winners
- Southern League Mid-Week Section: Runners-up
- FA Cup: 1st round (eliminated by Folkestone)
- Southern League Cup: Semi-final (competition not completed)
- Top goalscorer: League: Arthur Pritchard (34); All: Arthur Pritchard (44)
- Highest home attendance: 13,000 (estimate) v Guildford City, 7 April 1939
- Lowest home attendance: 4,000 (estimate) v Barry Town, 31 December 1938
- Average home league attendance: 8,307
- Biggest win: 8–0 v Dartford, 16 March 1939
- Biggest defeat: 0–3 v Cardiff City Reserves, 18 March 1939
Home colours

The 1938–39 season was Colchester United's second season in their history and their second in the Southern League. Alongside competing in the Southern League, the club also participated in the Southern League Mid-Week Section and Southern League Cup. Colchester won the Southern League title after beating local rivals Chelmsford City to the top of the league by one point. They also reached the 1st round of the FA Cup, where they were eliminated by Folkestone, and finished as runners-up to Tunbridge Wells Rangers in the Mid-Week Section. They reached the semi-final of the Southern League Cup, but the competition could not be completed due to fixture congestion.

== Season overview ==
Manager Ted Davis began strengthening his squad ready for a push to reach the Football League over the summer period. The public responded by turning out in force for a game against Gillingham, with 8,142 in attendance, and a week later, a visit from Arsenal 'A' saw 10,129 watch Colchester beat their counterparts 2–0. However, Davis securing a number of high-profile players came at a cost. Many were still contracted to the Football League clubs that they were signed from, meaning that if Colchester were to gain election to the Football League, the club would have very few contracted players.

Colchester made their first FA Cup outing during the 1938–39 season. They saw off Ilford 4–1 at Layer Road, but were defeated in the first round proper by Folkestone, watched by 8,160.

In a very successful season for the club, Colchester claimed the Southern League title by one point over Guildford City, scoring 110 goals in 44 games. They finished second in the Mid-Week Section, and reached the semi-final of the Southern League Cup, although due to fixture congestion, the game could not be played during the regular season and was postponed until the 1939–40 campaign.

Overall, Colchester scored 161 goals, with Arthur Pritchard netting 44 goals, George Wallis 24, and Alec Cheyne and Len Astill scoring 21 apiece.

The case for Football League election was presented to Football League members on 23 May 1938 by club director Walter Clark. With high hopes for election following a successful season, Colchester United failed to secure a single vote from the members, put down to the fact that there were so many League-registered players on the books that Davis had signed for Colchester.

Despite the League setback, the ownership of the Layer Road ground was passed to Colchester Borough Council, with club chairman Maurice Pye declaring:

Every lover of football, will I'm sure, welcome this as a move in the right direction, for whatever happens, this fine open space will always belong to the town, and be for the benefit of Colcestrians and their love of football.

== Players ==
As of match played 6 May 1939.

Name	Position	Nationality	Place of birth	Date of birth	Apps	Goals	Signed from	Date signed	Fee
Goalkeepers
Ronnie Dunn	GK	(England)	Southall	24 November 1908 (aged 29)	51	0	(England) Crystal Palace	3 July 1937	Free transfer
Billy Light	GK	(England)	Woolston	11 June 1913 (aged 24)	0	0	(England) West Bromwich Albion	17 June 1938	£1,500
Don Youngs	GK	(England)			7	0	(England) Martlesham RAF	5 November 1937	Free transfer
Defenders
Cecil Allan	LB	(Ireland)	Belfast	1 August 1914 (aged 23)	0	0	(England) Chelsea	27 May 1938	£2,000
Jimmy Baker	CB/RH	(Wales)	Trethomas	5 May 1904 (aged 34)	31	2	(England) Bristol City	9 July 1937	Free transfer
Joe Birch	LB/RB	(England)	Hednesford	6 July 1904 (aged 33)	0	0	(England) Fulham	24 June 1938	£750
Syd Fieldus	DF	(England)	Romford	27 May 1909 (aged 29)	21	3	(England) Brentford	3 July 1937	Free transfer
Ian Haley	RB	(England)	North Bierley		9	0	(England) Colchester Town	1 January 1938 (Note: Date of signing refers to the date of the player's first game for the club)	Free transfer
George Leslie	CB	(England)	Slough	9 July 1907 (aged 30)	43	0	(England) Guildford City	9 July 1937	Free transfer
Alf Worton	LB	(England)	Wolverhampton	4 April 1914 (aged 24)	0	0	(England) Norwich City	3 June 1938	Free transfer
Midfielders
Robert Morris	LH/RH	(England)	Hatton	11 March 1913 (aged 25)	0	0	(England) Norwich City	22 July 1938	£500
George Ritchie	LH	(Scotland)	Maryhill	16 January 1904 (aged 34)	31	1	(England) Leicester City	12 August 1937	Free transfer
George Smith	RH	(Wales)	Connah's Quay		24	2	(England) Bath City	27 October 1937	Free transfer
Forwards
Len Astill	IL/OL	(England)	Wolverhampton	30 December 1916 (aged 21)	0	0	(England) Ipswich Town	20 May 1938	Free transfer
Alec Cheyne	IH	(Scotland)	Glasgow	28 April 1907 (aged 31)	54	35	(England) Chelsea	13 August 1937	£3,000
George Crisp	WG	(Wales)	Pontypool	30 June 1911 (aged 26)	39	14	(Wales) Newport County	28 August 1937	Undisclosed
Jack Hodge	OR	(England)	Plymouth		51	24	(England) Luton Town	13 July 1937	Free transfer
Ernie Matthews	CF	(England)	Chester-le-Street	8 November 1912 (aged 25)	0	0	(England) Sheffield Wednesday	26 May 1938	£2,500
George Merritt	IF	(England)	Ormskirk		0	0	(England) Derby County	30 September 1938	Free transfer
Robert Murray	IF	(Scotland)	Newhaven	27 March 1915 (aged 23)	0	0	(England) Bath City	24 January 1939	£800
Arthur Pritchard	CF	(Wales)	Newport	22 October 1917 (aged 20)	37	29	(England) Yeovil & Petters United	28 August 1937	Free transfer
Ivan Thacker	CF	(England)	Lowestoft		4	1	(England) Lowestoft Town	18 February 1938	Free transfer
George Wallis	IF	(England)	Sawley		16	7	(England) Bath City	28 February 1938	Free transfer
George Williams	IR/CF				4	0	(England) Ipswich Town	17 July 1937	Free transfer

== Transfers ==
=== In ===
Date	Position	Nationality	Name	From	Fee	Ref.
20 May 1938	IL/OL	(England)	Len Astill	(England) Ipswich Town	Free transfer	
26 May 1938	CF	(England)	Ernie Matthews	(England) Sheffield Wednesday	£2,500	
27 May 1938	LB	(Ireland)	Cecil Allan	(England) Chelsea	£2,000	
3 June 1938	LB	(England)	Alf Worton	(England) Norwich City	Free transfer	
17 June 1938	GK	(England)	Billy Light	(England) West Bromwich Albion	£1,500	
24 June 1938	LB/RB	(England)	Joe Birch	(England) Fulham	£750	
22 July 1938	LH/RH	(England)	Robert Morris	(England) Norwich City	£500	
30 September 1938	IF	(England)	George Merritt	(England) Derby County	Free transfer	
24 January 1939	IF	(Scotland)	Robert Murray	(England) Bath City	£800	

- Total spending: ▼ ~ £8,050

=== Out ===
Date	Position	Nationality	Name	To	Fee	Ref.
End of season	RB	(England)	Cliff Fairchild	(England) Arsenal	£500	
14 May 1938	LH/RH	(England)	Jimmy Collins	Retired	Released	
14 May 1938	OL	(England)	Bill Barraclough	(England) Doncaster Rovers	Free transfer	
31 May 1938	CF/IL	(Wales)	Bill Pendergast	(England) Chester	Free transfer	
23 June 1938	LB	(United States)	Alexander Wood	(England) Chelmsford City	Free transfer	
September 1938	CF		Albert Bennett	Free agent	Released	
12 January 1939	IL/OL	(England)	Ken Mayes	(England) Chelmsford City	Free transfer	

- Total incoming: ▲ ~ £500

== Match details ==
=== Friendlies ===
15 October 1938 Friendly	Colchester United	4–2	Fulham Reserves	Colchester
	Astill 3', 18' (pen.); Williams 25' (o.g.); Cheyne	Report	Conroy 5'; Freeman	Stadium: Layer Road

27 December 1938 Friendly	Colchester United	2–0	Charlton Athletic Reserves	Colchester
	Pritchard 30'; Thacker 67'	Report		Stadium: Layer Road

16 October 1937 Friendly (Colchester Challenge Cup Final)	Colchester United	2–1	Southend United	Colchester
18:30	Cheyne 30'; Fieldus 85'	Report	Bolan 60'	Stadium: Layer Road

=== Southern League ===
==== League table ====
Pos	Team	Pld	W	D	L	GF	GA	GR	Pts	Result (Note: Number of goals for and/or against is inaccurate.)
1	Colchester United	44	31	5	8	110	37	2.973	67	Left league at end of season
2	Guildford City	44	30	6	8	126	52	2.423	66	
3	Gillingham	44	29	6	9	104	57	1.825	64	Left league at end of season
4	Plymouth Argyle II	44	26	5	13	128	63	2.032	57	Left league at end of season
5	Yeovil & Petters United	44	22	10	12	85	70	1.214	54	

Rules for classification: The system of using goal average to separate two teams tied on points was used up until the 1976-77 season. The points system: 2 points for a win, 1 point for a draw and 0 points for losing.

==== Matches ====
27 August 1938 1	Colchester United	2–0	Gillingham	Colchester
	Wallis 35'; Matthews 43'	Report		Stadium: Layer Road; Attendance: 8,142

3 September 1938 2	Colchester United	2–0	Arsenal 'A'	Colchester
	Cheyne 37'; Morris 87'	Report		Stadium: Layer Road; Attendance: 10,129

7 September 1938 3	Dartford	0–1	Colchester United	Dartford
		Report	Cheyne 28'	Stadium: Watling Street

10 September 1938 4	Colchester United	8–1	Yeovil & Petters United	Colchester
	Pritchard 14', 18', 29'; Morris 34'; Wallis 54'; Cheyne 54'; Gilmour 70' (o.g.); Astill 75'	Report	Graham 19'	Stadium: Layer Road; Attendance: 7,160

15 September 1938 5	Colchester United	4–0	Dartford	Colchester
	Astill 2', 65' (pen.); Pritchard 32', 48'	Report		Stadium: Layer Road; Attendance: 6,000

24 September 1938 6	Exeter City Reserves	2–1	Colchester United	Exeter
15:15	Bussey 65'; Worton 75' (o.g.)	Report	Pritchard 30'	Stadium: St James Park; Attendance: 2,500

1 October 1938 7	Colchester United	3–2	Cardiff City Reserves	Colchester
15:15	Pritchard 80'; Wallis	Report	Turner 40'; Birch (o.g.)	Stadium: Layer Road; Attendance: 7,247; Referee: G. Hamilton-Jones

8 October 1938 8	Aldershot Reserves	0–1	Colchester United	Aldershot
		Report	Crisp 43'	Stadium: Recreation Ground

13 October 1938 9	Colchester United	1–0	Folkestone	Colchester
	Pritchard 30'	Report		Stadium: Layer Road

22 October 1938 10	Cheltenham Town	2–1	Colchester United	Cheltenham
	Prior 15'; Leedham	Report	Pritchard 52'	Stadium: Whaddon Road; Referee: W. Harper

29 October 1938 11	Colchester United	3–1	Bristol Rovers Reserves	Colchester
	Cheyne 21', 35', 49'	Report	Kitchen 44'	Stadium: Layer Road; Attendance: 6,000

5 November 1938 12	Norwich City Reserves	1–5	Colchester United	Norwich
14:45	O'Reilly 84'	Report	Pritchard 20', 47', 67'; Crisp 41', 87'	Stadium: Carrow Road; Attendance: 3,005

19 November 1938 13	Yeovil & Petters United	2–1	Colchester United	Yeovil
	Graham 3'; Green 44'	Report	Pritchard 87'	Stadium: Huish Athletic Ground

3 December 1938 14	Colchester United	3–1	Cheltenham Town	Colchester
	Cheyne 16', 45'; Hodge 87'	Report	Butt 65'	Stadium: Layer Road; Attendance: 5,000

10 December 1938 15	Colchester United	4–0	Bath City	Colchester
	Cheyne 2'; Matthews 48'; Hodge	Report		Stadium: Layer Road

17 December 1938 16	Bristol Rovers Reserves	0–1	Colchester United	Bristol
		Report	Wallis 20'	Stadium: Eastville Stadium

31 December 1938 17	Colchester United	5–1	Barry Town	Colchester
	Wallis 15', 23', 63'; Hodge 76'; Pritchard 87'	Report	James 73'	Stadium: Layer Road; Attendance: 4,000

7 January 1939 18	Tunbridge Wells Rangers	0–2	Colchester United	Royal Tunbridge Wells
14:45		Report	Pritchard 55', 65'	Stadium: Down Farm

14 January 1939 19	Gillingham	1–3	Colchester United	Gillingham
	Johnson 50'	Report	Whitelaw 10' (o.g.); Crisp 20'; Pritchard 85'	Stadium: Priestfield Stadium; Attendance: 3,748; Referee: W. Daly

21 January 1939 20	Colchester United	7–0	Newport County Reserves	Colchester
	Hodge 3'; Pritchard 5', 7'; Astill 37', 54'; Wallis 80', 89'	Report		Stadium: Layer Road

4 February 1939 21	Colchester United	3–1	Swindon Town Reserves	Colchester
15:10	Astill 3', 66'; Morris 71'	Report	Woodman 63'	Stadium: Layer Road

11 February 1939 22	Torquay United Reserves	0–2	Colchester United	Torquay
		Report	Baker 30'; Pritchard 89'	Stadium: Plainmoor

18 February 1939 23	Colchester United	2–0	Aldershot Reserves	Colchester
	Murray 9'; Hodge	Report		Stadium: Layer Road

25 February 1939 24	Folkestone	1–4	Colchester United	Folkestone
	Davis	Report	Pritchard 13', 43'; Wallis 15'; Astill	Stadium: Cheriton Road

2 March 1939 25	Colchester United	6–1	Exeter City Reserves	Colchester
	Pritchard 25', 28', 58'; Astill 31', 56'; Murray 35'	Report	Bussey 86'	Stadium: Layer Road

4 March 1939 26	Plymouth Argyle Reserves	0–3	Colchester United	Plymouth
		Report	Pritchard 18'; Murray 30'; Hodge 67'	Stadium: Home Park; Attendance: 5,200

11 March 1939 27	Swindon Town Reserves	2–1	Colchester United	Swindon
	Woolhouse 72'; Woodman	Report	Pritchard 85'	Stadium: County Ground; Attendance: 5,000

18 March 1939 28	Cardiff City Reserves	3–0	Colchester United	Cardiff
	Prescott 1'; Court 39', 42'	Report		Stadium: Ninian Park

25 March 1939 29	Newport County Reserves	0–1	Colchester United	Newport
		Report	Cheyne 80'	Stadium: Somerton Park

29 March 1939 30	Arsenal 'A'	0–0	Colchester United	Enfield
		Report		Stadium: Enfield Stadium

30 March 1939 31	Colchester United	1–1	Tunbridge Wells Rangers	Colchester
	Murray 67'	Report	Wood 25'	Stadium: Layer Road

1 April 1939 32	Colchester United	5–1	Torquay United Reserves	Colchester
15:15	Pritchard 36', 38', 55'; Crisp 43'; Cheyne 61'	Report	Dyer 15'	Stadium: Layer Road

7 April 1939 33	Colchester United	1–0	Guildford City	Colchester
	Pritchard 50'	Report		Stadium: Layer Road; Attendance: 13,000

8 April 1939 34	Colchester United	1–1	Worcester City	Colchester
	Pritchard 14'	Report	Melaniphy 75'	Stadium: Layer Road

10 April 1939 35	Guildford City	3–1	Colchester United	Guildford
	J. Brown 27'; McPheat 53'; R. Brown 68'	Report	Crisp 18'	Stadium: St Joseph's Road; Attendance: 10,000

11 April 1939 36	Colchester United	5–1	Norwich City Reserves	Colchester
	Cheyne 8'; Wallis 35'; Hodge	Report	Johnson	Stadium: Layer Road

15 April 1939 37	Barry Town	0–2	Colchester United	Barry
		Report	Crisp 12'; Matthews	Stadium: Jenner Park Stadium

20 April 1939 38	Bath City	0–3	Colchester United	Bath
		Report	Hodge 25'; Pritchard	Stadium: Twerton Park

22 April 1939 39	Colchester United	2–3	Plymouth Argyle Reserves	Colchester
	Cheyne 20'; Pritchard 22'	Report	Chitty 4', 46'; Olver 72'	Stadium: Layer Road

24 April 1939 40	Chelmsford City	0–0	Colchester United	Chelmsford
		Report		Stadium: New Writtle Street; Attendance: 7,000

27 April 1939 41	Worcester City	1–0	Colchester United	Worcester
	Burns 80'	Report		Stadium: St George's Lane

29 April 1939 42	Colchester United	4–0	Ipswich Town Reserves	Colchester
15:15	Hodge 28'; Wallis 33', 55'; Birch 70' (pen.)	Report		Stadium: Layer Road

1 May 1939 43	Colchester United	2–2	Chelmsford City	Colchester
	Astill 32'; Morris 88'	Report	Palethorpe 13'; Wright 70'	Stadium: Layer Road; Attendance: 5,000

6 May 1939 44	Ipswich Town Reserves	2–3	Colchester United	Ipswich
	Lawrence 26'; O'Leary 72'	Report	Cheyne 20'; Wallis 21'; Astill 82'	Stadium: Portman Road; Attendance: 12,000

=== Southern League Mid-Week Section ===
==== League table ====
Pos	Team	Pld	W	D	L	GF	GA	GR	Pts	Qualification
1	Tunbridge Wells Rangers (C)	16	8	7	1	37	18	2.056	23	Southern League Midweek Section champions
2	Colchester United	16	9	2	5	36	21	1.714	20	
3	Norwich City Reserves	16	7	4	5	40	26	1.538	18	
4	Millwall Reserves	16	7	4	5	33	23	1.435	18	
5	Portsmouth 'A'	16	5	4	7	21	29	0.724	14	

Rules for classification: 1) Points; 2) Goal average; 3) Number of goals scored. The system of using goal average to separate two teams tied on points was used up until the 1976–77 season. The points system: 2 points for a win, 1 point for a draw and 0 points for losing.
(C) Champions

==== Matches ====
22 September 1938 1	Norwich City Reserves	0–2	Colchester United	Norwich
		Report	Astill 9'; Cassidy 43' (o.g.)	Stadium: Carrow Road; Attendance: 2,505

28 September 1938 2	Folkestone	1–2	Colchester United	Folkestone
	Appleby 32'	Report	Hodge 5'; Pritchard 53'	Stadium: Cheriton Road; Referee: J. Farmer

6 October 1938 3	Colchester United	2–2	Tunbridge Wells Rangers	Colchester
	Wallis 27'; Astill 29'	Report	Wood 31'; Grainger 63'	Stadium: Layer Road

20 October 1938 4	Colchester United	4–1	Portsmouth 'A'	Colchester
	Cheyne 60', 83', 89'; Thacker	Report	Jepson 80'	Stadium: Layer Road

27 October 1938 5	Colchester United	1–3	Aldershot Reserves	Colchester
	Smith 42'	Report	Turner 3', 86'; Gray 32'	Stadium: Layer Road

14 December 1938 6	Aldershot Reserves	1–2	Colchester United	Aldershot
	Curtis 25'	Report	Matthews 34'; Hodge 68'	Stadium: Recreation Ground

9 January 1939 7	Millwall Reserves	1–2	Colchester United	Millwall
	Daniels 10'	Report	Crisp 48'; Pritchard 65'	Stadium: The Den

2 February 1939 8	Colchester United	3–1	Folkestone	Colchester
	Wallis 10', 42'; Astill 88'	Report	Birch 49' (o.g.)	Stadium: Layer Road

8 February 1939 9	Guildford City	1–0	Colchester United	Guildford
	Woolf 47'	Report		Stadium: St Joseph's Road; Attendance: 750

15 February 1939 10	Tunbridge Wells Rangers	2–1	Colchester United	Royal Tunbridge Wells
	Archibald 57'; Robinson 80'	Report	Pritchard 18'	Stadium: Down Farm

23 February 1939 11	Colchester United	3–0	Guildford City	Colchester
	Morris 30'; Cheyne 78'; Astill 88'	Report		Stadium: Layer Road

16 March 1939 12	Colchester United	8–0	Dartford	Colchester
	Hodge 2'; Cheyne 34'; Murray 49'; Wallis 65'; Pritchard 75', 80'; Crisp 89'	Report		Stadium: Layer Road

22 March 1939 13	Portsmouth 'A'	1–0	Colchester United	Portsmouth
	Candy 49'	Report		Stadium: Fratton Park

23 March 1939 14	Colchester United	2–1	Millwall Reserves	Colchester
	Astill	Report	Walsh 15'	Stadium: Layer Road

2 May 1939 15	Dartford	2–2	Colchester United	Dartford
	Heathcote 30'; Kitchener	Report	Pritchard 6'; Wallis 85'	Stadium: Watling Street

4 May 1939 16	Colchester United	2–4	Norwich City Reserves	Colchester
	Murray 64'; Wallis 89'	Report	Bates 5', 15'; Maskell 25'	Stadium: Layer Road

=== Southern League Cup ===
17 September 1938 1st round	Colchester United	5–0	Ipswich Town Reserves	Colchester
15:15	Hodge 17'; Cheyne 19'; Pritchard 65'; Astill 71', 84'	Report	Shufflebottom (red card) 60'	Stadium: Layer Road; Attendance: 10,000; Referee: S. Flaxman

28 January 1939 2nd round	Colchester United	3–1	Arsenal 'A'	Colchester
15:00	Wallis 4'; Astill 21'; Pritchard 72'	Report	Bremner 20'	Stadium: Layer Road; Attendance: 10,000

13 April 1939 3rd round	Colchester United	2–0	Folkestone	Colchester
	Cheyne 6'; Pritchard 75'	Report		Stadium: Layer Road

=== FA Cup ===
12 November 1938 4th qualifying round	Colchester United	4–1	Ilford	Colchester
14:30	Pritchard 15'; Wallis 53'; Crisp 60'; Hodge 69'	Report	Robinson 48'	Stadium: Layer Road; Attendance: 6,100

26 November 1938 1st round	Folkestone	2–1	Colchester United	Folkestone
	Ashley 76'; Birch (o.g.)	Report	Leslie 87'	Stadium: Cheriton Road; Attendance: 4,700

== Squad statistics ==
=== Appearances and goals ===
No.	Pos	Nat	Player	Total		Southern League		FA Cup		Southern League Mid-Week Section		Southern League Cup	
No.	Pos	Nat	Player	Apps	Goals	Apps	Goals	Apps	Goals	Apps	Goals	Apps	Goals
	GK	(England) ENG	Ronnie Dunn	3	0	1	0	0	0	2	0	0	0
	GK	(England) ENG	Billy Light	42	0	26	0	2	0	12	0	2	0
	GK	(England) ENG	Don Youngs	20	0	17	0	0	0	2	0	1	0
	DF	(Northern Ireland) NIR	Cecil Allan	3	0	0	0	0	0	3	0	0	0
	DF	(Wales) WAL	Jimmy Baker	21	1	14	1	2	0	5	0	0	0
	DF	(England) ENG	Joe Birch	62	1	44	1	2	0	13	0	3	0
	DF	(England) ENG	Syd Fieldus	1	0	0	0	0	0	1	0	0	0
	DF	(England) ENG	Ian Haley	1	0	0	0	0	0	1	0	0	0
	DF	(England) ENG	George Leslie	58	1	40	0	2	1	13	0	3	0
	DF	(England) ENG	Alf Worton	64	0	44	0	2	0	15	0	3	0
	MF	(England) ENG	Robert Morris	65	5	44	4	2	0	16	1	3	0
	MF	(Scotland) SCO	George Ritchie	1	0	0	0	0	0	0	0	1	0
	MF	(Wales) WAL	George Smith	36	1	21	0	0	0	13	1	2	0
	FW	(England) ENG	Len Astill	41	21	27	12	0	0	12	6	2	3
	FW	(Scotland) SCO	Alec Cheyne	40	21	29	14	2	0	6	5	3	2
	FW	(Wales) WAL	George Crisp	31	11	20	7	2	1	8	3	1	0
	FW	(England) ENG	Jack Hodge	60	17	42	12	2	1	13	3	3	1
	FW	(England) ENG	Ernie Matthews	7	4	6	3	0	0	1	1	0	0
	FW	(England) ENG	George Merritt	4	0	3	0	0	0	1	0	0	0
	FW	(Scotland) SCO	Robert Murray	29	6	21	4	0	0	8	2	0	0
	FW	(Wales) WAL	Arthur Pritchard	59	44	40	34	2	1	14	6	3	3
	FW	(England) ENG	Ivan Thacker	1	1	0	0	0	0	1	1	0	0
	FW	(England) ENG	George Wallis	63	24	43	16	2	1	15	6	3	1
Players who appeared for Colchester who left during the season
	FW	(England) ENG	Ken Mayes	3	0	2	0	0	0	1	0	0	0

=== Goalscorers ===
Place	Nationality	Position	Name	Southern League	FA Cup	SL Mid-Week Section	Southern League Cup	Total
1	(Wales)	CF	Arthur Pritchard	34	1	6	3	44
2	(England)	IF	George Wallis	16	1	6	1	24
3	(England)	IL/OL	Len Astill	12	0	6	3	21
3	(Scotland)	IH	Alec Cheyne	14	0	5	2	21
5	(England)	OR	Jack Hodge	12	1	3	1	17
6	(England)	WG	George Crisp	7	1	3	0	11
7	(Scotland)	IF	Robert Murray	4	0	2	0	6
8	(England)	LH/RH	Robert Morris	4	0	1	0	5
9	(England)	CF	Ernie Matthews	3	0	1	0	4
10	(Wales)	CB/RH	Jimmy Baker	1	0	0	0	1
10	(England)	LB/RB	Joe Birch	1	0	0	0	1
10	(England)	CB	George Leslie	0	1	0	0	1
10	(Wales)	RH	George Smith	0	0	1	0	1
10	(England)	CF	Ivan Thacker	0	0	1	0	1
			Own goals	2	0	1	0	3
			TOTALS	110	5	36	10	161

=== Captains ===
Number of games played as team captain.

Place	Nationality	Position	Player	Southern League	FA Cup	SL Mid-Week Section	Southern League Cup	Total
1	(England)	CB	George Leslie	38	2	12	2	54
			Not recorded	6	0	4	1	11
			TOTALS	44	2	16	3	65

=== Clean sheets ===
Number of games goalkeepers kept a clean sheet.

Place	Nationality	Player	Southern League	FA Cup	SL Mid-Week Section	Southern League Cup	Total
1	(England)	Billy Light	13	2	0	1	16
2	(England)	Don Youngs	6	1	0	1	8
3	(England)	Ronnie Dunn	1	0	0	0	1
		TOTALS	20	0	3	2	25

=== Player debuts ===
Players making their first-team Colchester United debut in a fully competitive match.

Position	Nationality	Player	Date	Opponent	Ground	Notes
GK	(England)	Billy Light	28 August 1938	Gillingham	Layer Road	
LB/RB	(England)	Joe Birch	28 August 1938	Gillingham	Layer Road	
LH/RH	(England)	Robert Morris	28 August 1938	Gillingham	Layer Road	
LB	(England)	Alf Worton	28 August 1938	Gillingham	Layer Road	
IL/OL	(England)	Len Astill	28 August 1938	Gillingham	Layer Road	
CF	(England)	Ernie Matthews	28 August 1938	Gillingham	Layer Road	
LB	(Ireland)	Cecil Allan	22 September 1938	Norwich City Reserves	Carrow Road	
IF	(England)	George Merritt	8 October 1938	Aldershot Reserves	Recreation Ground	
IF	(Scotland)	Robert Murray	2 February 1939	Folkestone	Layer Road	

== See also ==
- List of Colchester United F.C. seasons
