= 1939–40 Colchester United F.C. season =

Colchester United
1939–40 season
- Chairman: Walter Clark
- Manager: Ted Davis (until September 1939)
- Stadium: Layer Road
- Southern League: League abandoned
- Top goalscorer: League: Alec Cheyne (2); All: Len Astill; Joe Birch; Alec Cheyne; George Law (2)
- Highest home attendance: 4,200 v Plymouth Argyle Reserves, 26 August 1939
- Lowest home attendance: 4,200 v Plymouth Argyle Reserves, 26 August 1939
- Average home league attendance: 4,200
- Biggest win: 5–1 v Norwich City Reserves, 28 August 1939
- Biggest defeat: 1–2 v Chelmsford City, 31 August 1939
Home colours

The 1939–40 season was Colchester United's third season in their history and their third in the Southern League. Alongside competing in the Southern League, the club were also due to participate in the Southern League Mid-Week Section, FA Cup and Southern League Cup. They were also due to play the Southern League Cup matches remaining from the previous season during the campaign, but only played the outstanding semi-final fixture against Norwich City Reserves. The season was to end prematurely, with competitive football abandoned with the outbreak of World War II. Colchester United played regular season fixtures until 2 September 1939, with the 0–0 draw at Layer Road with Ipswich Town Reserves the final competitive fixture to be played by the club for almost six years.

== Season overview ==
War loomed over Europe during the beginning of the 1939–40 campaign. After kicking the season off with a win against Plymouth Argyle Reserves on 26 August 1939, Colchester played Norwich City Reserves in the first-leg of the delayed Southern League Cup semi-final, beating their opponents 5–1. After only three Southern League games, World War II was declared, and as with predecessors Colchester Town during World War I, the club closed down, denying the club a chance to earn League football after gaining considerable momentum over the previous two seasons.

Colchester United continued to play friendlies against local opposition until December 1939, when the Army Fire Fighting Corp took over Layer Road for drill practice. The ground itself did continued to host matches during hostilities, as a number of high-profile military encounters took place at the stadium. The influx of military personnel through Colchester Garrison ensured that Layer Road played host to a number of star players through the war years.

== Players ==
As of match played 2 September 1939.

Name	Position	Nationality	Place of birth	Date of birth	Apps	Goals	Signed from	Date signed	Fee
Goalkeepers
Billy Light	GK	(England)	Woolston	11 June 1913 (aged 25)	42	0	(England) West Bromwich Albion	17 June 1938	£1,500
Defenders
Jimmy Baker	CB/RH	(Wales)	Trethomas	5 May 1904 (aged 35)	52	3	(England) Bristol City	9 July 1937	Free transfer
Joe Birch	LB/RB	(England)	Hednesford	6 July 1904 (aged 34)	62	1	(England) Fulham	24 June 1938	£750
Syd Fieldus	DF	(England)	Romford	27 May 1909 (aged 30)	22	3	(England) Brentford	3 July 1937	Free transfer
George Leslie	CB	(England)	Slough	9 July 1907 (aged 31)	101	1	(England) Guildford City	9 July 1937	Free transfer
Alf Worton	LB	(England)	Wolverhampton	4 April 1914 (aged 25)	64	0	(England) Norwich City	3 June 1938	Free transfer
Midfielders
Bill Main	WH	(Scotland)	St Monans		0	0	(England) Cardiff City	19 August 1939	Free transfer
Robert Morris	LH/RH	(England)	Hatton	11 March 1913 (aged 26)	65	5	(England) Norwich City	22 July 1938	£500
Forwards
Len Astill	IL/OL	(England)	Wolverhampton	30 December 1916 (aged 22)	41	21	(England) Ipswich Town	20 May 1938	Free transfer
Ken Burditt	IF	(England)	Ibstock	12 November 1906 (aged 32)	0	0	(England) Notts County	25 May 1939	£1,000
Alec Cheyne	IH	(Scotland)	Glasgow	28 April 1907 (aged 32)	94	56	(England) Chelsea	13 August 1937	£3,000
George Law	CF	(England)	Wellingborough	12 May 1912 (aged 27)	0	0	(England) Norwich City	18 June 1939	£100
Arthur Pritchard	CF	(Wales)	Newport	22 October 1917 (aged 21)	96	72	(England) Yeovil & Petters United	28 August 1937 (Note: Date of signing refers to the date of the player's first game for the club)	Free transfer
Ivan Thacker	CF	(England)	Lowestoft		5	2	(England) Lowestoft Town	18 February 1938	Free transfer
George Wallis	IF	(England)	Sawley		79	31	(England) Bath City	28 February 1938	Free transfer

== Transfers ==
=== In ===
Date	Position	Nationality	Name	From	Fee	Ref.
25 May 1939	IF	(England)	Ken Burditt	(England) Notts County	£1,000	
18 June 1939	CF	(England)	George Law	(England) Norwich City	£100	
19 August 1939	WH	(Scotland)	Bill Main	(England) Cardiff City	Free transfer	

- Total spending: ▼ ~ £1,100

=== Out ===
Date	Position	Nationality	Name	To	Fee	Ref.
End of season	LH	(Scotland)	George Ritchie	(England) Ipswich Town Reserves assistant coach	Free transfer	
End of season	RH	(Wales)	George Smith	Free agent	Released	
End of season	IF	(England)	George Merritt	Free agent	Released	
4 May 1939	RB	(England)	Ian Haley	Free agent	Released	(Note: Date of departure refers to the date of the player's final game for the club)
31 May 1939	GK	(England)	Ronnie Dunn	Free agent	Released	
31 May 1939	LB	(Ireland)	Cecil Allan	(England) Colchester Casuals	Free transfer	
31 May 1939	OR	(England)	Jack Hodge	(England) Hereford United	Free transfer	
31 May 1939	CF	(England)	Ernie Matthews	(England) Ashington	Free transfer	
31 May 1939	IR/CF		George Williams	Free agent	Released	
1 July 1939	GK	(England)	Don Youngs	Free agent	Released	
21 July 1939	WG	(Wales)	George Crisp	(England) Nottingham Forest	Undisclosed	
31 August 1939	IF	(Scotland)	Robert Murray	Free agent	Released	
2 September 1939	LB/RB	(England)	Joe Birch	Free agent	Released	
2 September 1939	CB	(England)	George Leslie	Free agent	Released	
2 September 1939	WH	(Scotland)	Bill Main	Free agent	Released	
2 September 1939	LH/RH	(England)	Robert Morris	Free agent	Released	
2 September 1939	LB	(England)	Alf Worton	Free agent	Released	
2 September 1939	IL	(England)	Len Astill	Free agent	Released	
2 September 1939	IF	(England)	Ken Burditt	Free agent	Released	
2 September 1939	CF	(England)	George Law	Free agent	Released	
2 September 1939	IF	(England)	George Wallis	Free agent	Released	
7 September 1939	CB/RH	(Wales)	Jimmy Baker	Retired	Retired	
7 September 1939	CF	(Wales)	Arthur Pritchard	Free agent	Released	
5 January 1940	IH	(Scotland)	Alec Cheyne	(England) Chelmsford City	Released	

== Match details ==
=== Friendlies ===
16 August 1939 Friendly	Southend United	2–2	Colchester United	Southend-on-Sea
	Martin 25'; Ormandy	Report	Pritchard	Stadium: Southend Stadium; Attendance: 1,753

30 September 1939 Friendly	Crittall Athletic	1–1	Colchester United	Braintree
	Unknown goalscorer	Report	Law	Attendance: 800

7 October 1939 Friendly	Colchester United	4–1	17th/21st Lancers	Colchester
15:00	Leslie 25'; Morris 70'; Bidewell 71'; Law 72'	Report	Simpson 32'	Stadium: Layer Road; Attendance: 500

14 October 1939 Friendly	Colchester United	1–2	Crittall Athletic	Colchester
15:00	Cheyne 30'	Report	Edwards 37'; Rees 75'	Stadium: Layer Road

21 October 1939 Friendly	Chelmsford City	4–0	Colchester United	Chelmsford
	Wright 30'; Shaw 37'; Burley	Report		Stadium: New Writtle Street; Attendance: 3,417

28 October 1939 Friendly	Colchester United	3–3	Norwich City Reserves	Colchester
	Cheyne 47', 75'; Birch 60' (pen.)	Report	Coleman 30'; Rose 35'; Houseago 62'	Stadium: Layer Road

7 November 1939 Friendly	Colchester United	7–0	Officers' Cadet Training Unit	Colchester
15:00	Edwards; Fieldus; Perrett; Rees	Report		Stadium: Layer Road

11 November 1939 Friendly	Southend United	3–2	Colchester United	Southend-on-Sea
	Shalcross; Oswald; Lewis	Report	Mullane 15', 18'	Stadium: Southend Stadium

25 November 1939 Friendly	Colchester United	2–1	Fulham Reserves	Colchester
14:40	Fieldus; Birch (pen.)	Report	Cranfield	Stadium: Layer Road

2 December 1939 Friendly	Colchester United	4–0	Southend United	Colchester
14:30	Birch 30' (pen.); Rees 45'; Cheyne	Report		Stadium: Layer Road

9 December 1939 Friendly	Colchester United	4–3	17th/21st Lancers	Colchester
14:30	Little 10'; Perrett; Pendergast	Report	Elder 65'; McCormack	Stadium: Layer Road

16 December 1939 Friendly	Colchester United	1–1	Chelmsford City	Colchester
	Cheyne 25'	Report	Jones 20'	Stadium: Layer Road; Attendance: 500

23 December 1939 Friendly	Chelmsford City	6–1	Colchester United	Chelmsford
	Beauchamp; Burley; Jones; McCormick; Sliman (pen.)	Report	Cheyne	Stadium: New Writtle Street; Attendance: 1,300

25 December 1939 Friendly	Norwich City Reserves	1–2	Colchester United	Norwich
	Unknown goalscorer	Report	Little; Rees	Stadium: Carrow Road

26 December 1939 Friendly	Colchester United	3–4	Norwich City Reserves	Colchester
14:15	Potts; Simpson	Report	Unknown goalscorer	Stadium: Layer Road

30 December 1939 Friendly	Colchester United	3–2	Dartford	Colchester
	Morris 60'; Fieldus	Report	Rozier	Stadium: Layer Road; Attendance: 200

=== Southern League ===
26 August 1939 1	Colchester United	3–1	Plymouth Argyle Reserves	Colchester
15:15	Law 14'; Cheyne 51'; Birch 85' (pen.)	Report	Olver 88'	Stadium: Layer Road; Attendance: 4,200

31 August 1939 2	Colchester United	1–2	Chelmsford City	Colchester
	Cheyne 83'; Wallis (red card)	Report	Burley 10'; Phillips 35'	Stadium: Layer Road

2 September 1939 3	Colchester United	0–0	Ipswich Town Reserves	Colchester
		Report		Stadium: Layer Road

=== Southern League Cup ===
28 August 1939 1938–39 Semi-final 1st leg	Norwich City Reserves	1–5	Colchester United	Norwich
	Coleman	Report	Law 57'; Astill 60'; Pritchard; Birch (pen.)	Stadium: Carrow Road; Attendance: 1,480

== Squad statistics ==
=== Appearances and goals ===
No.	Pos	Nat	Player	Total		Southern League		Southern League Cup	
No.	Pos	Nat	Player	Apps	Goals	Apps	Goals	Apps	Goals
	GK	(England) ENG	Billy Light	4	0	3	0	1	0
	DF	(England) ENG	Joe Birch	4	2	3	1	1	1
	DF	(England) ENG	Syd Fieldus	1	0	1	0	0	0
	DF	(England) ENG	George Leslie	1	0	1	0	0	0
	DF	(England) ENG	Alf Worton	4	0	3	0	1	0
	MF	(Scotland) SCO	Bill Main	3	0	2	0	1	0
	MF	(England) ENG	Robert Morris	4	0	3	0	1	0
	FW	(England) ENG	Len Astill	4	2	3	0	1	2
	FW	(England) ENG	Ken Burditt	3	0	2	0	1	0
	FW	(Scotland) SCO	Alec Cheyne	3	2	3	2	0	0
	FW	(England) ENG	George Law	4	2	3	1	1	1
	FW	(Wales) WAL	Arthur Pritchard	2	1	1	0	1	1
	FW	(England) ENG	George Wallis	4	0	3	0	1	0
Players who appeared for Colchester who left during the season
	FW	(Scotland) SCO	Robert Murray	3	0	2	0	1	0

=== Goalscorers ===
Place	Nationality	Position	Name	Southern League	Southern League Cup	Total
1	(England)	IL	Len Astill	0	2	2
1	(England)	LB/RB	Joe Birch	1	1	2
1	(Scotland)	IH	Alec Cheyne	2	0	2
1	(England)	CF	George Law	1	1	2
5	(Wales)	CF	Arthur Pritchard	0	1	1
			Own goals	0	0	0
			TOTALS	4	5	9

=== Disciplinary record ===
Nationality	Position	Name	Southern League		Southern League Cup		Total	
Nationality	Position	Name	Booked	Sent off (straight red)	Booked	Sent off (straight red)	Booked	Sent off (straight red)
(England)	IF	George Wallis	0	1	0	0	0	1
		TOTALS	0	1	0	0	0	1

=== Captains ===
Number of games played as team captain.

Place	Nationality	Position	Player	Southern League	Southern League Cup	Total
1	(Scotland)	IH	Alec Cheyne	1	0	1
1	(England)	CB	George Leslie	1	0	1
			Not recorded	1	1	2
			TOTALS	3	1	4

=== Clean sheets ===
Number of games goalkeepers kept a clean sheet.

Place	Nationality	Player	Southern League	Southern League Cup	Total
1	(England)	Billy Light	1	0	1
		TOTALS	1	0	1

=== Player debuts ===
Players making their first-team Colchester United debut in a fully competitive match.

Position	Nationality	Player	Date	Opponent	Ground	Notes
WH	(Scotland)	Bill Main	26 August 1939	Plymouth Argyle Reserves	Layer Road	
IF	(England)	Ken Burditt	26 August 1939	Plymouth Argyle Reserves	Layer Road	
CF	(England)	George Law	26 August 1939	Plymouth Argyle Reserves	Layer Road	

== See also ==
- List of Colchester United F.C. seasons
