= George Law =

George Law may refer to:

- George Henry Law (1761–1845), Anglican bishop
- George Law (financier) (1806–1881)
- George Law Curry (1820–1878), governor of Oregon Territory
- George Law (footballer, born 1885), (1885–1969), Scottish footballer
- George Law (footballer, born 1912) (1912–1970), English footballer for Norwich City
- George Law (cricketer) (1846–1911)
- SS George Law, an 1850s steamship
