= Jack Mayes =

English footballer

Personal information
- Full name: Jack Arnold Mayes
- Date of birth: 8 December 1913
- Place of birth: Wickford, England
- Date of death: 1994 (aged 80–81)
- Height: 5 ft 7 in (1.70 m)
- Position: Wing half

Senior career*
| Years | Team | Apps | (Gls) |
| 1932–1933 | Barking | | |
| 1933–1934 | Crystal Palace | 0 | (0) |
| 1934–1935 | Barking | | |
| 1935–1939 | Chelsea | 12 | (0) |
| 1939 | Chelmsford City | 2 | (0) |
- * Club domestic league appearances and goals

Jack Arnold Mayes (8 December 1913 – 1994) was an English professional footballer who played as a wing half.

== Career ==
Mayes began his career at Barking in 1932, signing for Crystal Palace the following year. After failing to make an appearance at Crystal Palace, Mayes returned to Barking. In 1935, Mayes signed for Chelsea. Over the course of three seasons, Mayes made 12 Football League appearances at the club before the outbreak of World War II. Mayes later played for Chelmsford City, alongside his brother Ken.
