= Ken Burditt =

English footballer (1906–1977)

Personal information
- Full name: Frederick Charles Kendall Burditt
- Date of birth: 12 November 1906
- Place of birth: Ibstock, England
- Date of death: 27 October 1977 (aged 70)
- Height: 5 ft 10 in (1.78 m)
- Position: Forward

Senior career*
Years	Team	Apps	(Gls)
- Ibstock Penistone Rovers
- Bloxwich Strollers
1930	Gresley Rovers	7	(7)
1930–1936	Norwich City	173	(61)
1936–1938	Millwall	69	(33)
1938–1939	Notts County		
1939	Colchester United	2	(0)
- → Leicester City (guest)
Total		182	(68)
- * Club domestic league appearances and goals

Frederick Charles Kendall Burditt (12 November 1906 – 27 October 1977) was an English footballer who played as a forward in the Football League for Norwich City, Millwall and Notts County.

== Career ==
Born in Ibstock, Burditt began playing for local club Ibstock Penistone Rovers, followed by Bloxwich Strollers, before moving to Gresley Rovers where he appeared in seven games for the club, scoring seven goals. He made his debut against Walsall Reserves on 30 August 1930, with his final game coming on 25 October of the same year against Redditch.

After leaving Gresley, Burditt joined Football League club Norwich City, making his debut on 17 January 1931 at home to Walsall in a 3–1 Third Division South victory. Burditt went on to make 173 appearances for the Canaries, scoring 61 goals. His final game came in a 2–1 Second Division win over Doncaster Rovers on 2 May 1936.

Burditt then moved to Millwall and was a member of a number of giant-killing squads in the 1936–37 FA Cup, including a 3–0 win over Chelsea in the fourth round on 30 January 1937, scoring twice, a 2–1 win against Derby County on 20 January in the fifth round, and a 2–0 win over Manchester City on 6 March in the quarter-final. He finished the season as Millwall's top goalscorer with 25 goals. He would then move on to Notts County in 1938, before exiting the Football League in 1939 to join Southern League club Colchester United for £1,000.

With the U's, Burditt could only manage two league appearances in the 1939–40 season due to the outbreak of World War II. During the war years, he returned to Ibstock and worked as a coal miner. He also appeared as a guest player for Leicester City playing five games, but could not continue a playing career in football because his mining work had affected his lungs.

Burditt died on 27 October 1977 in Grimsby.
