= Ernie Matthews =

English footballer

Personal information
- Full name: Ernest Matthews
- Date of birth: 8 November 1912
- Place of birth: Chester-le-Street, England
- Height: 5 ft 10 in (1.78 m)
- Position: Forward

Senior career*
Years	Team	Apps	(Gls)
- Kibblesworth Welfare
1935–1937	Bury	73	(46)
1937–1938	Sheffield Wednesday	16	(7)
1938–1939	Colchester United	6	(3)
- Ashington
Total		95	(56)
- * Club domestic league appearances and goals

Ernest Matthews (born 8 November 1912, date of death unknown) was an English professional footballer who played as a forward in the Football League for Bury and Sheffield Wednesday.

After joining from Kibblesworth Welfare, Matthews was the leading goalscorer for Bury for his two seasons with the club, and the third highest goalscorer in the Football League. His performances prompted Sheffield Wednesday to pay £3,700 in 1937. He spent one season with Wednesday, scoring seven goals in 16 outings, before signing for Southern League side Colchester United for £2,500 in 1938. Injury forced Matthews out of the Championship winning side, and he returned to the North East of England to play for Ashington in 1939.

== Career ==
Born in Chester-le-Street, Matthews playing career began with nearby Kibblesworth Welfare, before he joined Football League club Bury. Between 1935 and 1937, he scored 46 goals in 73 appearances, becoming Bury's leading scorer in both the 1935–36 and 1936–37 seasons. In addition, Matthews was also the third highest goalscorer in the entire Football League.

Sheffield Wednesday signed Matthews for £3,700 in 1937. Matthews made his debut in the Second Division game with Tottenham Hotpsur on 16 September 1937, a game which Wednesday lost 3–0 at Hillsborough. He went on to make 16 appearances for the club, scoring seven goals. He played his last match on 5 March 1938, a 3–1 home defeat by Manchester United.

Southern League side Colchester United paid £2,500 for Matthews on 26 May 1938. He made a goalscoring debut for Colchester on 27 August, scoring the U's second goal in a 2–0 win over Gillingham at Layer Road. However, two weeks later, he suffered knee ligament damage, ruling him out until December. During this time, Arthur Pritchard had scored 17 goals at the rate of a goal a game, limiting Matthews' chances in the first-team. He made six league appearances for Colchester, scoring three times, before being released by the club at the end of the 1938–39 season. He then returned to the North East to play for Ashington.
