= Jack Ormandy =

English footballer

Personal information
- Full name: John Ormandy
- Date of birth: 25 January 1912
- Place of birth: Liverpool, England
- Date of death: 6 January 1997 (aged 84)
- Place of death: Dewsbury, England
- Height: 5 ft 7 in (1.70 m)
- Position: Outside left

Senior career*
Years	Team	Apps	(Gls)
- Prescot Cables
1932–1936	Bradford City	63	(9)
1936–1939	Bury	87	(18)
1939–1946	Southend United	0	(0)
1946–1947	Oldham Athletic	30	(5)
1947–1948	Halifax Town	7	(0)
Total		187	(32)
- * Club domestic league appearances and goals

John Ormandy (25 January 1912 – 6 January 1997) was an English professional footballer who played as an outside left.

== Career ==
Born in Liverpool, Ormandy played for Prescot Cables, Bradford City, Bury, Southend United, Oldham Athletic and Halifax Town. For Bradford City, he made 63 appearances in the Football League; he also made 3 FA Cup appearances.

For Bury, he made 87 appearances in the Football League; he also made 5 FA Cup appearances.

== Sources ==
- Frost, Terry (1988). Bradford City A Complete Record 1903–1988. Breedon Books Sport. ISBN 0-907969-38-0.
