= Jackie Little =

English footballer

Personal information
- Full name: John Little
- Date of birth: 17 May 1912
- Place of birth: Gateshead, England
- Date of death: 15 October 2007 (aged 95)
- Place of death: Ipswich, England
- Position: Winger

Senior career*
Years	Team	Apps	(Gls)
1937–1950	Ipswich Town	146	(20)
1950–????	Stowmarket Town		

Managerial career
- 1950–????: Stowmarket Town
- * Club domestic league appearances and goals

John Little (17 May 1912 − 15 October 2007) was an English professional footballer. During his career he made almost 150 appearances for Ipswich Town. After retiring from professional football, he joined Stowmarket Town as player-coach.

He died in October 2007, aged 95.
