= Harry Freeman (footballer) =

English footballer

Personal information
- Full name: Harold Freeman
- Date of birth: 4 November 1918
- Place of birth: England
- Date of death: 19 March 1997 (aged 78)
- Position: Right-back

Senior career*
Years	Team	Apps	(Gls)
1937–1952	Fulham	179	(7)
1952–1953	Walsall	21	(1)
- Dover
1954–1956	Ashford Town	41	(3)

Managerial career
- 1955–1956: Ashford Town (player-manager)
- * Club domestic league appearances and goals

Harry Freeman (4 November 1918 – 19 March 1997) was a professional footballer who played as a full back. He played for Fulham between 1937 and 1952 (although this spell was split by the outbreak of the Second World War. He played 179 league matches and scored 7 goals. He made 190 appearances in all competitions for the club, scoring 8 goals. He spent about 3 years based at Kempston Barracks in Bedfordshire, he was married to Olive who moved up and stayed with Mr and Mrs Childerly in Margetts Rd.

After leaving Fulham his League career continued at Walsall, after which he played non-league football at Dover and initially as a player then player-manager at Ashford Town (Kent).
