= Maurice Conroy =

English footballer

Personal information
- Full name: Richard Maurice Conroy
- Date of birth: 26 April 1919
- Place of birth: Bradford, England
- Date of death: December 2006 (aged 87)
- Place of death: East Riding of Yorkshire, England
- Position: Full back

Senior career*
Years	Team	Apps	(Gls)
1937–1939	Fulham	0	(0)
1946–1949	Accrington Stanley	87	(1)
1950–1951	Scunthorpe & Lindsey United	1	(0)
Total		88	(1)
- * Club domestic league appearances and goals

Richard Maurice Conroy (26 April 1919 - December 2006) is an English retired professional footballer who played as a full back in the Football League.
