= Len Bolan =

English footballer

Personal information
- Full name: Leonard Arthur Bolan
- Date of birth: 16 March 1909
- Place of birth: Lowestoft, England
- Date of death: 1973 (aged 63–64)
- Height: 5 ft 7 in (1.70 m)
- Position: Outside right

Senior career*
Years	Team	Apps	(Gls)
- Lowestoft Town
1933–1934	Tottenham Hotspur	10	(3)
1935–1940	Southend United	104	(20)
- * Club domestic league appearances and goals

Leonard Arthur Bolan (16 March 1909 in Lowestoft – 1973) was a professional footballer who played for Lowestoft Town, Tottenham Hotspur and Southend United.

== Football career ==
Bolan played for his local side Lowesoft Town before having spells at Norwich City in 1930 and West Ham United in 1931 without appearing in the senior team for either club. The outside right joined Tottenham Hotspur where he was involved in 10 matches and scoring three goals between 1933 and 1934. In 1935 Bolan joined Southend United and featured in 121 matches and finding the net on 24 occasions between 1935 and 1940.
