= George Law (footballer, born 1912) =

English footballer

Personal information
- Full name: Dudley George Law
- Date of birth: 12 May 1912
- Place of birth: Wellingborough, England
- Date of death: 2 October 1970 (aged 58)
- Place of death: Dover, England
- Height: 5 ft 10 in (1.78 m)
- Position: Forward

Senior career*
| Years | Team | Apps | (Gls) |
| 1934–1938 | Northampton Town | 0 | (0) |
- Rushden Town
| 1938–1939 | Norwich City | 6 | (2) |
| 1939 | Colchester United | 3 | (1) |
- Lowestoft Town
- Wellingborough Town
| Total | | 9 | (3) |
- * Club domestic league appearances and goals

Dudley George Law (12 May 1912 – 2 October 1970) was an English professional footballer who played as a forward in the Football League for Norwich City.

Registered with Northampton Town since 1934, Law turned out for Rushden Town after Northampton scrapped their 'A' team. He scored 100 goals in 18-months with the club, prompting Norwich City to sign him. He scored twice in six Football League games for Norwich, before joining Colchester United. However, his time with Colchester was cut short due to the outbreak of World War II, and he moved to Lowestoft, where he appeared for Lowestoft Town and later Wellingborough Town.

== Career ==
Born in Wellingborough, Law was signed to Northampton Town in October 1934 as an amateur whilst still working at an Earls Barton boot factory. After Northampton terminated their 'A' team, Law played for Rushden Town while still registered to Northampton. He scored 100 goals for Rushden during his 18-month stint with the sides, prompting Luton Town, Norwich City and Rochdale to declare their interest in the player. He signed for Norwich in January 1938 and scored 16 goals in three months for the reserve side. His performances earned him a place in the first-team for the first time, and he made his debut in the closing game of the 1937–38 season, a 2–0 defeat to Aston Villa at Villa Park on 7 May 1938.

Law scored a further 24 goals for Norwich's reserve side during the 1938–39 season, but could only manage a further five appearances and two goals for the first-team.

Ahead of the 1939–40 season, Law joined Southern League side Colchester United. He made a goalscoring debut for the club on 26 August 1939 as the U's beat Plymouth Argyle Reserves 3–1 at Layer Road, scoring the opening goal. However, with the declaration of World War II, the league was abandoned, leaving Law with one goal in three league matches.

Law moved to Lowestoft after the abandonment of Colchester's season, where he became a lorry driver and would later turn out for Lowestoft Town and his hometown club Wellingborough Town. Law died while on holiday in Kent on 2 October 1970.
