= Frank Shufflebottom =

English footballer

Personal information
- Date of birth: 9 October 1917
- Place of birth: Chesterfield, England
- Height: 5 ft 10 in (1.78 m)
- Position: Right back

Youth career
- 1935–1936: Margate

Senior career*
Years	Team	Apps	(Gls)
1936–1939	Ipswich Town	43	(0)
1939–1946	Nottingham Forest	2	(0)
- →(wartime)
- →Raith Rovers (guest)
- →Kilmarnock (guest)
1945–1946	→Dundee United (guest)	16	(1)
1946–1948	Bradford City	56	(0)
- * Club domestic league appearances and goals

Frank Shufflebottom (born 9 October 1917, date of death unknown) was an English professional footballer who played as a right back.

== Career ==
Born in Chesterfield, Shufflebottom began his career at Margate, before turning professional with Ipswich Town in June 1936. Over the next three seasons Shufflebottom made a total of 43 appearances in the Southern Football League. His career was interrupted by World War Two; he signed for Nottingham Forest in June 1939, but didn't make an official appearance until the Football League began again in 1946. During and immediately after the War, Shufflebottom was a guest player for Scottish clubs Raith Rovers, Kilmarnock and Dundee United. He moved to Bradford City in October 1946, making 56 league appearances over the next two years.
