= George Law (cricketer) =

English cricketer (1846–1911)

George Law (17 April 1846 – 30 July 1911) was an English first-class cricketer active from 1871 to 1881. He played for Middlesex and Marylebone Cricket Club (MCC). He was born in Rochdale and died in Marylebone.
