= Arthur Pritchard =

Welsh footballer

Personal information
- Full name: Arthur Brynley Pritchard
- Date of birth: 22 October 1917
- Place of birth: Newport, Wales
- Date of death: December 2005 (aged 87–88)
- Place of death: Newport, Wales
- Height: 5 ft 9 in (1.75 m)
- Position: Forward

Senior career*
Years	Team	Apps	(Gls)
- Oakdale
–1937	Newport County	4	(0)
1937	Yeovil & Petters United		(8)
1937–1939	Colchester United	63	(51)
Total		67	(59)
- * Club domestic league appearances and goals

Arthur Brynley Pritchard (22 October 1917 – December 2005) was a Welsh professional footballer who played as a forward in the Football League for Newport County.

== Career ==
Born in Newport, Wales, Pritchard started his career with local club Oakdale, before signing with hometown club Newport County. Here, he made his professional debut, making four appearances in the Football League. He joined Southern League side Yeovil & Petters United midway through the 1936–37 season, scoring eight goals.

Pritchard joined Colchester United ahead of their inaugural Southern League season in the summer of 1937, starting against his former club Yeovil in their first ever professional match, when Yeovil came out 3–0 victors at the Huish on 28 August 1937. He scored twice in the first professional match to be played at Layer Road on 2 September, scoring the third and fifth goals in a 6–1 win against Bath City. During the 1937–38 season, Pritchard registered 17 league goals in 22 outings, with four goals in four games in the Southern League Cup, and eight goals in eleven games in all other competitions. He also helped the club to win the Southern League Cup in their first season.

The 1938–39 season saw Pritchard become a virtual ever-present in the starting eleven. He scored 34 times in 40 league games, in addition to one goal in two FA Cup appearances, three goals in three Southern League Cup outings and six in fourteen in other competitions, as Colchester went on to win the Southern League title.

Pritchard played his final games for the club during the ill-fated 1939–40 season. He scored a contentious goal in Colchester's delayed Southern League Cup semi-final from the 1938–39 season on 28 August 1939 during a 5–1 win at Carrow Road over Norwich City Reserves. This was to be his last goal for the club. His final match was a 2–1 home defeat by Chelmsford City in the Southern League on 31 August. During his time with Colchester, Pritchard became something of a record setter, becoming the first U's player to hit seven hat-tricks for the club, and two four goal hauls. These records were later broken by Arthur Turner.

As an Army reservist, Pritchard was called to Edinburgh to rejoin his regiment, the Royal Scots Greys as soon as war was declared. The Royal Scots Greys were involved in heavy fighting in the North African Campaign, Italian Campaign and the North West Europe Campaign. As such, Pritchard was twice erroneously reported as killed in action by the local press.

== Honours ==
Colchester United

- 1938 Southern League Cup winner
- 1938–39 Southern League winner

All honours referenced by:
