= George Wallis (footballer) =

English footballer

Personal information
- Full name: George Henry Wallis
- Date of birth: 1910
- Place of birth: Sawley, England
- Date of death: 1988 (aged 77–78)
- Place of death: Derby, England
- Height: 5 ft 11 in (1.80 m)
- Position: Inside forward

Senior career*
Years	Team	Apps	(Gls)
–1933	Sandiacre Excelsior		
1933–1934	Birmingham	0	(0)
1934–1937	Bristol City	42	(14)
1937–1938	Bath City		
1938–1939	Colchester United	56	(20)
Total		98	(34)
- * Club domestic league appearances and goals

George Henry Wallis (1910–1988) was an English professional footballer who played as an inside forward in the Football League for Bristol City.

== Career ==
Born in Sawley, Derbyshire, Wallis started his career with nearby Sandiacre Excelsior. He was picked up by Birmingham in 1933, but 18 months at St Andrew's yielded no appearances in the first team, and Wallis moved on to Bristol City in August 1934. During his three-year stay with City, he racked up 14 goals in 42 league games, making 46 appearances in all competitions.

Wallis signed for Bath City in 1937, but when the club was forced to reduce its wage bill, former Bath manager and then Colchester United manager Ted Davis brought Wallis to Layer Road on 28 February 1938, having scored a brace of goals for Bath the previous weekend.

Making his Colchester debut in a 1–0 win at home to Dartford in the Southern League Mid-Week Section, and scored his first goal in the league just two days later, as his side fell to a 2–1 defeat to Bristol Rovers Reserves. He almost missed the game, arriving at the ground 15 minutes before kick-off after manager Davis had appealed to railway officials at Paddington station to allow a non-stop train to Newport, Wales, to stop at Badminton, Gloucestershire, before a taxi took Wallis and fellow player Bill Pendergast to Bristol.

During his first full season with the club, Wallis made 63 appearances in all competitions throughout 1938–39, scoring 23 goals and helping his side to the Southern League title. His final Colchester goal was a late consolation during their 4–2 Mid-Week Section home defeat by Norwich City Reserves on 4 May 1939.

In the penultimate game before the outbreak of the Second World War, Wallis was sent off during the Southern League game with Chelmsford City at Layer Road on 31 August 1939. After making an "inexcusable foul" on a Chelmsford player, Wallis was dismissed, although his actions had followed a "crippling injury" to Bill Main. The match also boiled over when Colchester fans clashed with Chelmsford fans, players and staff following the 2–1 home defeat. He, along with many of his teammates, then played their last competitive game for Colchester on 2 September 1939, in a 0–0 draw with Ipswich Town Reserves ahead of the war.

== Honours ==
Colchester United

- 1938–39 Southern League winner

All honours referenced by:
