= George Smith (footballer, born 1910) =

Welsh footballer

Personal information
- Full name: George Smith
- Date of birth: 1910
- Place of birth: Connah's Quay, Wales
- Height: 5 ft 11 in (1.80 m)
- Position: Left half

Senior career*
Years	Team	Apps	(Gls)
- Connah's Quay
–1930	Bristol City		
1930–1932	Thames	73	
1932–1933	Bradford City	1	(0)
1933–	Newport County	4	(0)
- Wolverhampton Wanderers
	Bournemouth	16	(0)
–1937	Bath City		
1937–1939	Colchester United	36	(2)
- Clacton Town
Total		130	(2)
- * Club domestic league appearances and goals

George Smith (born 1910, date of death unknown) was a Welsh professional footballer who played as a left half back in the Football League for Bradford City, Newport County and Bournemouth.

== Career ==
Born in Connah's Quay, Wales, Smith began his career in his hometown, playing for Connah's Quay Football Club. He was signed by Football League side Bristol City, before joining London-based Thames in 1930, where he made 73 appearances. He moved to Bradford City in 1932, where he made his league debut in which was to be his only appearance for the Bradford in one year at Valley Parade. He returned to Wales with Newport County in 1933, making four appearances. He once again moved on, this time to Wolverhampton Wanderers, and then to Bournemouth, where he would make 16 appearances. He transferred to Bath City after leaving Bournemouth, but would later team up with former Bath manager Ted Davis at newly formed Southern League rivals Colchester United in 1937.

After signing for Colchester on 27 October 1937, Smith made his debut three days later in the Southern League Mid-Week Section win against Dartford. He scored the first of two league goals for the club on 6 November 1937, scoring from a rebound Alec Cheyne effort in a 2–2 draw against his former club Newport County's reserve side. During his time with Colchester, Smith amassed 60 appearances in all competitions, scoring three goals. He made his final appearance on 22 March 1939 as Colchester were beaten 1–0 by a Portsmouth 'A' side at Fratton Park. He managed to help his side to the Southern League title during the 1938–39 season.

After leaving Colchester, Smith served during World War II, before returning to play for Clacton Town with a number of other former Colchester United players.

== Honours ==
Colchester United

- 1938–39 Southern League winner

All honours referenced by:
