= Alf Worton =

English footballer

Personal information
- Full name: Alfred James Worton
- Date of birth: 4 April 1914
- Place of birth: Wolverhampton, England
- Date of death: December 2000 (aged 85–86)
- Place of death: Stourbridge, England
- Height: 5 ft 10 in (1.78 m)
- Position: Left-back

Senior career*
Years	Team	Apps	(Gls)
- Ettingshall Westley
- Bilston Borough
1933–1934	Walsall	0	(0)
1933–1938	Norwich City		
1938–1939	Colchester United	47	(0)
Total		47	(0)
- * Club domestic league appearances and goals

Alfred James Worton (4 April 1914 – December 2000) was an English professional footballer who played as a left-back in the Football League for Norwich City.

Having played in the Midlands non-Leagues, Worton was signed by Walsall in 1933, but after failing to break into the first team, he signed for Norwich City after just one season. He made his professional debut for Norwich in 1934, and remained with the club for four seasons, before joining Southern League side Colchester United.

== Career ==
Worton began his career playing for local sides Ettingshall Westley and Bilston Borough, before being signed up by Walsall in 1933. He made over 60 reserve appearances for the club, but failed to break into the first-team. He was signed by Norwich City on 9 June 1934, joining the club following their promotion to the Second Division.

Worton made his debut for Norwich on 13 October 1934 in a 2–1 defeat at Blackpool. He would go on to represent the club 23 times between 1934 and 1938, before joining Southern League side Colchester United on a free transfer on 3 June 1938. He made his Colchester debut on 27 August 1938 as the U's beat Gillingham 2–0 at Layer Road. He made 68 appearances during his time with Colchester, making the left-back position his own and helping the club to the 1938–39 Southern League title. He started each of Colchester's games in the early stages of the 1939–40 season, but the outbreak of World War II caused the league to be abandoned, and Worton returned to his Midlands home.

After retiring from playing, Worton would work in a Wolverhampton boilermaker until his retirement in 1977. He died in Stourbridge in December 2000.

== Honours ==
Colchester United

- 1938–39 Southern Football League winner
