= Ken Mayes =

English footballer

Personal information
- Full name: Kenneth William Mayes
- Date of birth: 8 October 1910
- Place of birth: Wickford, England
- Date of death: 21 February 1975 (aged 64)
- Height: 5 ft 6 in (1.68 m)
- Positions: Inside left; outside left

Senior career*
Years	Team	Apps	(Gls)
- Barking Town
- Brentwood & Warley
1931	Southend United	5	(1)
- Barking Town
1934–1935	Fulham	2	(0)
- Colchester Town
1937–1938	Colchester United	21	(0)
1938–1940	Chelmsford City		
- * Club domestic league appearances and goals

Kenneth William Mayes (8 October 1910 – 21 February 1975) was an English footballer who played as an inside left or outside left for Southend United and Fulham in the Football League. He also played for Barking Town, Brentwood & Warley and Colchester United.

== Personal life ==
Mayes played alongside his brother, Jack, at Chelmsford City.
