= Jimmy Baker (footballer, born 1904) =

Welsh footballer

Personal information
- Full name: James Edward Baker
- Date of birth: 5 May 1904
- Place of birth: Trethomas, Wales
- Date of death: 1979 (aged 74–75)
- Place of death: Solihull, England
- Height: 6 ft 0 in (1.83 m)
- Position: Wing half

Senior career*
Years	Team	Apps	(Gls)
- Lovell's Athletic
1926–1929	Wolverhampton Wanderers	16	(0)
1929–1932	Coventry City	108	(8)
1932–1933	Lovell's Athletic		
1933–1935	Coventry City	74	(3)
1935–1937	Bristol City	10	(0)
1937–1939	Colchester United	31	(2)
Total		239	(13)
- * Club domestic league appearances and goals

James Edward Baker (5 May 1904 – 1979) was a Welsh footballer who played in the Football League as a wing half. He made appearances for league clubs Wolverhampton Wanderers, Coventry City and Bristol City, also playing for Lovell's Athletic and Colchester United.

== Career ==
Born in Trethomas, Baker played for the works team for non-league Lovell's sweet manufacturers Lovell's Athletic, before signing for Second Division side Wolverhampton Wanderers in 1926, making his Football League debut on 30 April 1927 in a 2–1 win over Fulham.

Baker remained at Molineux for three seasons but only managed 17 appearances in total during this period, 16 of which were in the league. He joined Coventry City in 1929, where he would go on to have two spells, interspersed by a return to Lovell's Athletic. Baker made over 108 league appearances for Coventry before moving to Bristol City in January 1935.

His Bristol City stint saw Baker play in only 10 games and so signed for newly formed Southern League club Colchester United in 1937, making his debut in a match against Folkestone on 23 September 1937. He made 52 appearances in all competitions for the U's, scoring three times and aiding the club to the Southern League Cup in 1937–38 and the league title in 1938–39. He retired from playing following his stay at Colchester, playing his last match on 11 March 1939 against Swindon Town Reserves.

== Honours ==
Colchester United

- 1937–38 Southern League Cup winner
- 1938–39 Southern League winner

All honours referenced by:
