= Robert Morris (English footballer) =

English footballer (1913–??)

Personal information
- Full name: Robert Arthur John Morris
- Date of birth: 11 March 1913
- Place of birth: Hatton, London, England
- Height: 5 ft 11 in (1.80 m)
- Position: Wing half

Senior career*
Years	Team	Apps	(Gls)
- Brentford
- Slough
- Leyton
- Southall
1933–1938	Norwich City		
1938–1939	Colchester United	47	(4)
1940	Southend United (guest)		
1940–1941	Fulham (guest)		
1942–1943	Crystal Palace (guest)		
1943–1944	Reading (guest)		
1945–1946	Crystal Palace (guest)		
Total		47	(4)
- * Club domestic league appearances and goals

Robert Arthur John Morris (born 11 March 1913, date of death unknown), also known as Roy Morris, was an English professional footballer who played as a wing half in the Football League for Norwich City.

Morris was signed to Norwich from Brentford in 1933. He had also appeared for non-League clubs Slough, Leyton and Southall. He made his Norwich debut in 1933, and remained with the Canaries until 1938, when he joined Southern League side Colchester United, where he would make 69 first team appearances until World War II.

== Career ==
Born in Hatton, London, Morris was on the books at Brentford, where he featured mostly in the 'A' team. While with Brentford, Morris also turned out for non-League sides including Slough, Leyton and Southall. He was signed from Brentford by Norwich City on 8 May 1933. He earned the nickname "Roy" while with the Canaries after manager Tom Parker continually referred to him as Roy rather than Robert. Morris made his professional debut for the club on 7 October 1933, becoming the 391st player to represent Norwich. City lost the match 2–0 at home to Torquay United in the Third Division South match.

After five years with Norwich, Morris moved to Southern League side Colchester United on 22 July 1938 for their second-ever season, but remained on City's transfer list with a value of £500. He made his Colchester debut on 27 August in their 2–0 win against Gillingham at Layer Road, and scored his first goal in the next game on 3 September as the U's beat an Arsenal 'A' side 2–0.

Having helped the club to the Southern League title in his first season with the club, Morris ended the campaign with 65 appearances, the most of any player at the club across the season. He began the 1939–40 season by appearing in all of Colchester's games before the league was abandoned following the U's 0–0 draw with Ipswich Town Reserves on 2 September owing to the outbreak of World War II.

During the war years, Morris appeared for a number of sides, including Southend United in May 1940, five appearances for Fulham in 1940–41, six appearances for Crystal Palace in 1942–43, five appearances for Reading in 1943–44 and a further three for Palace in 1945–46.

== Honours ==
Colchester United

- 1938–39 Southern Football League winner
