= Len Astill =

English footballer

Personal information
- Full name: Leonard Victor Astill
- Date of birth: 30 December 1916
- Place of birth: Wolverhampton, England
- Date of death: 25 March 1990 (aged 73)
- Place of death: Lilleshall, England
- Height: 5 ft 11 in (1.80 m)
- Position: Left winger

Youth career
- Horden Road School
- Old Hall School
- Heath Town

Senior career*
Years	Team	Apps	(Gls)
1933–1935	Wolverhampton Wanderers	2	(0)
1936–1937	Blackburn Rovers	3	(1)
1937–1938	Ipswich Town	27	(12)
1938–1939	Colchester United	30	(13)
Total		62	(26)
- * Club domestic league appearances and goals

Leonard Victor Astill (30 December 1916 – 25 March 1990) was an English footballer who played as a left winger in the Football League for Wolverhampton Wanderers and Blackburn Rovers. He also appeared in the Southern League for Ipswich Town and Colchester United.

== Career ==
Born in Wolverhampton, Astill played as a youth for Horden Road and Old Hall schools in Wolverhampton, before joining local club Heath Town, and then being picked up by hometown Football League club Wolverhampton Wanderers. After only two appearances for Wolves, he moved to Blackburn Rovers in 1935 having gained England Junior caps during the 1934–35 season. He signed for a fee of £3,000, but could only manage three appearances and one goal at Ewood Park.

Astill moved to East Anglia from Blackburn to Ipswich Town in 1937, where he scored 12 goals in 27 league games during his solitary season at the club. For Astill to remain at Portman Road, Ipswich needed to stump up a £1,000 fee for his signing, but the club refused despite the player being second-top scorer for the 1937–38 season, and so moved on to neighbours Colchester United. The move to Colchester proved fruitful for Astill as he helped the club secure the Southern League title in his first season. After his debut on 27 August 1938 in a 2–0 win over Gillingham and scoring his first goal against Yeovil & Petters United in an 8–1 thrashing on 10 September, Astill ended his first season with 13 goals in 27 league appearances, but his time at the club was cut short with the outbreak of World War II and the cancellation of the 1939–40 season, where he appeared in all three matches before the competition was abandoned.

== Personal life ==
The War spelt the end of Astill's playing career, and he became an on-course bookmaker in Telford, before becoming a newsagent and then settling in Walsall working as a market trader for almost 30 years. Leonard Astill died on 25 March 1990.

== Honours ==
Colchester United

- 1938–39 Southern Football League winner

All honours referenced by:
