= Ronnie Dunn (footballer) =

English footballer

Personal information
- Full name: Ronald Victor Dunn
- Date of birth: 24 November 1908
- Place of birth: Southall, London, England
- Date of death: January 1994 (aged 85)
- Place of death: Swale, England
- Height: 5 ft 9 1/2 in (1.77 m)
- Position: Goalkeeper

Senior career*
Years	Team	Apps	(Gls)
1926–1929	Dorset Regiment		
1929–1931	Wealdstone		
1931–1937	Crystal Palace	167	(0)
1937–1939	Colchester United	32	(0)
Total		199	(0)
- * Club domestic league appearances and goals

Ronald Victor Dunn (24 November 1908 – January 1994) was an English professional footballer who played as a goalkeeper in the Football League for Crystal Palace.

Dunn represented his regiment in the British Army before joining Wealdstone. He then joined Crystal Palace, where he spent six years, before moving to newly formed Southern League side Colchester United in 1937. He spent two years with Colchester before the Second World War, after which he retired from playing.

== Career ==
Born in Southall, London, Dunn served in the British Army in the Dorset Regiment, who he represented at football as an 18-year-old, joining Wealdstone in 1929. After featuring in a British Armed Forces game at Selhurst Park, Dunn was signed by Crystal Palace in 1931 to act as understudy to Billy Callender.

Following Callender's suicide in 1932, Dunn took up the role of first-team goalkeeper at Palace, where he went on to make 175 appearances in all competitions between 1931 and 1937.

Dunn joined newly formed Southern League side Colchester United in 1937. He played in Colchester's first ever competitive league game on 28 August 1937, making numerous saves despite being defeated 3–0 by Yeovil & Petters United at The Huish. In his first appearance at Colchester's home ground of Layer Road, prominent bugle and cornet player Dunn welcomed the players of both Colchester United and Bath City onto the pitch with a rendition of the post horn galop on 2 September 1937 for Colchester's first professional game at Layer Road. Dunn's introduction using the Post Horn Galop continued throughout the club's time at Layer Road, until 2008. His musical background also saw him as a member of the Crystal Palace Prize Band, in which he played the cornet. Later in the season, Crystal Palace manager Tom Bromilow brought his side to Layer Road for a friendly match in recognition of Dunn's services to the club. Colchester won the game 2–1, just two days after Dunn's father had died. Dunn helped Colchester win the Southern League Cup in his only full season with the club.

Although initially released at the end of the 1937–38 season, Dunn was retained to aid United's reserve side for the 1938–39 season. He made his final outing for Colchester against Newport County Reserves in the league on 25 March 1939, keeping a clean sheet as Colchester defeated their counterparts 1–0 at Somerton Park. Dunn was then released at the end of the season. He made 32 Southern League appearances, five Southern League Cup appearances and played 17 games in Mid-Week Section and other competitions.

After leaving Colchester, Dunn was called up as an army reserve in 1939, spending five years in West Africa. He did not continue to play professional football on his return to England. He died at the age of 85 in Swale in January 1994.

== Honours ==
Colchester United

- 1938 Southern League Cup winner

All honours referenced by:
