= George Crisp =

Welsh footballer

Personal information
- Full name: George Henry Crisp
- Date of birth: 30 June 1911
- Place of birth: Pontypool, Wales
- Date of death: 1982 (aged 70–71)
- Position: Winger

Senior career*
Years	Team	Apps	(Gls)
- Llanelli
1934–1935	Coventry City	8	(0)
- Bristol Rovers
- Newport County
1937–1939	Colchester United	39	(16)
- Nottingham Forest
- Merthyr Tydfil
Total		47	(16)
- * Club domestic league appearances and goals

George Henry Crisp (30 June 1911 – 1982) was a Welsh footballer who played in the Football League as a winger for Coventry City. He also represented Llanelli, Bristol Rovers, Newport County, Colchester United, Nottingham Forest and Merthyr Tydfil.

== Career ==
Crisp, born in Penrhiwceiber, began his career with Welsh club Llanelli. He moved from Llanelli to Football League club Coventry City in the Third Division South in November 1933, making his debut in a 4–1 defeat to Bristol Rovers on 20 January 1934. He made seven appearances in the 1933–34 season and one appearance in the 1934–35 season. He made his final appearance for the club in a 2–1 defeat to Newport County on 15 September 1934, moving to Bristol Rovers in July 1935.

Crisp went on to appear for Bristol Rovers and later Newport County, the two clubs which he made his first and final Coventry appearances for respectively, prior to joining newly formed Southern League team Colchester United in August 1937. He made his debut in Colchester's first-ever competitive match, a 3–0 away defeat to Yeovil & Petters United on 28 August 1937. He scored his first goal for the club against neighbours and rivals Ipswich Town on 4 September 1937 in a 3–3 home draw.

Over his two seasons with Colchester, Crisp made 39 Southern League appearances and scored 16 goals. He scored his final goal for Colchester on 15 April 1939 in a 2–0 away victory over Barry Town and made his final appearance in a 4–2 defeat to Norwich City Reserves on 4 May 1939.

After leaving Colchester, Crisp would later represent Nottingham Forest and Merthyr Tydfil. He died in 1982.
