= Syd Fieldus =

English footballer

Syd Fieldus MBE
Personal information
- Full name: Sydney Albert William Fieldus
- Date of birth: 27 May 1909
- Place of birth: Romford, England
- Date of death: April 1974 (aged 64)
- Place of death: Colchester, England
- Position: Defender

Senior career*
Years	Team	Apps	(Gls)
- Clapton Orient
- Brentford
- Colchester Town
1937–1939	Colchester United	19	(3)
1946–1947	Colchester United	2	(0)
- Chelmsford City

Managerial career
- 1945–1946: Colchester United
- * Club domestic league appearances and goals

Sydney Albert William Fieldus MBE (27 May 1909 – April 1974) was an English footballer who played as a defender.

== Early life ==
Fieldus was born in Romford, Essex on 27 May 1909.

== Career ==
Fieldus began his career with both Clapton Orient and Brentford, before signing for Colchester United in 1937. He made 23 appearances in all competitions for the club, before the outbreak of World War II. During the war, he served as a Captain in the Essex Home Guard, being awarded an MBE for his efforts on 15 December 1944, whilst he also appeared for Clapton Orient, Southend United and Colchester Wanderers – a club formed by Fieldus who were disbanded upon the return of league football. Following the culmination of the war, Fieldus was instrumental in helping restart Colchester's footballing activities, serving the club as secretary-manager from June 1945 to April 1946. Following his time at Colchester, Fieldus appeared for Chelmsford City.

== Later life and death ==
Fieldus died in Colchester in April 1974.

== Managerial statistics ==
Team	From	To	Record				
Team	From	To	P	W	D	L	Win %
Colchester United	1 June 1945	15 April 1946	31	11	7	13	35.5
