= Joe Birch =

English footballer (1904–1980)

Personal information
- Full name: Joseph Birch
- Date of birth: 6 July 1904
- Place of birth: Hednesford, England
- Date of death: 4 December 1980 (aged 76)
- Place of death: Colchester, England
- Height: 5 ft 10 in (1.78 m)
- Position: Full back

Senior career*
| Years | Team | Apps | (Gls) |
| 1920–1926 | Cannock Town | | |
| 1926–1928 | Hednesford Town | | |
| 1928–1929 | Birmingham | 1 | (0) |
| 1929–1931 | Bournemouth & Boscombe Athletic | 26 | (0) |
| 1931–1938 | Fulham | 185 | (0) |
| 1938–19?? | Colchester United | | |
- * Club domestic league appearances and goals

Joseph Birch (6 July 1904 – 4 December 1980) was an English professional footballer who made more than 200 appearances in the Football League playing for Birmingham, Bournemouth & Boscombe Athletic and Fulham. He played as a full back.

Birch was born in Hednesford, Staffordshire. He played non-league football for Cannock Town and Hednesford Town before joining Birmingham in 1928. Birch played his only game for Birmingham in the First Division on Boxing Day 1928 in a 6–2 defeat at Bolton Wanderers, just before the club paid £4,000 for the services of Huddersfield Town full back Ned Barkas. He played for Bournemouth & Boscombe Athletic in the Third Division South before moving on to Fulham. In his first season Birch contributed to their winning the Third Division South title and consequent promotion, and in seven seasons with the club he played 185 league games. They awarded him a benefit match against fellow west London club Queens Park Rangers in 1937. He finished off his career with Colchester United, with whom he won the championship of the Southern League in the 1938–39 season.

Birch died in Colchester, Essex, in 1980 at the age of 76.

== Honours ==
Fulham

- Third Division South champions: 1931–32

Colchester United

- Southern League champions: 1938–39
