= Robert Murray (Scottish footballer) =

Scottish footballer (born 1915)

Robert David Murray (27 March 1915, date of death unknown) was a Scottish footballer who played as a forward. Born in Newhaven, Edinburgh, he played for Heart of Midlothian, Manchester United, Bath City and Colchester United.

== Honours ==
=== Club ===
Colchester United

- Southern Football League: 1938–39
