= 1966–67 Colchester United F.C. season =

Colchester United
1966–67 season
- Chairman: Bill Allen (until January); Harold Moore (from January)
- Manager: Neil Franklin
- Stadium: Layer Road
- Third Division: 13th
- FA Cup: 2nd round (eliminated by Peterborough United)
- League Cup: 1st round (eliminated by Queens Park Rangers)
- Top goalscorer: League: Reg Stratton (24); All: Reg Stratton (24)
- Highest home attendance: 9,081 v Peterborough United, 7 January 1967
- Lowest home attendance: 3,965 v Scunthorpe United, 11 February 1967
- Average home league attendance: 5,714
- Biggest win: 5–0 v Doncaster Rovers, 15 October 1966
- Biggest defeat: 0–5 v Queens Park Rangers, 23 August 1966 v Torquay United, 19 November 1966
Home colours

The 1966–67 season was Colchester United's 25th season in their history and their first back in the third tier of English football, the Third Division, following promotion from the Fourth Division the previous season. Alongside competing in the Third Division, the club also participated in the FA Cup and the League Cup.

Colchester finished comfortably mid-table by finishing 13th. Queens Park Rangers defeated the U's 5–0 in the League Cup, while Peterborough United knocked them out in the second round of the FA Cup.

== Season overview ==
Neil Franklin spent £4,000 to sign Ken Hodgson from Bournemouth in the summer, and alongside Peter Bullock, the pair amassed 31 goals between them. Meanwhile, Reg Stratton scored 24 league goals as Colchester ended their first season back in the Third Division with a mid-table 13th position finish.

== Players ==
As of match played 13 May 1967.

Name	Position	Nationality	Place of birth	Date of birth	Apps	Goals	Signed from	Date signed	Fee
Goalkeepers
Alan Buck	GK	(England)	Colchester	25 August 1946 (aged 19)	11	0	Amateur	July 1963	Free transfer
Sandy Kennon	GK	(South Africa)	Johannesburg	28 November 1933 (aged 32)	60	0	(England) Norwich City	March 1965	Free transfer
Defenders
Alan Dennis	CB	(England)	Colchester	22 February 1951 (aged 15)	0	0	Apprentice	April 1967	Free transfer
Duncan Forbes	CB	(Scotland)	Edinburgh	19 June 1941 (aged 24)	187	1	(Scotland) Musselburgh Athletic	4 September 1961	Nominal
Brian Hall	LB	(England)	Burbage	9 March 1939 (aged 27)	60	12	(England) Mansfield Town	March 1965	Free transfer
Mick Loughton	CB	(England)	Colchester	8 December 1942 (aged 23)	77	2	Amateur	August 1961	Free transfer
Dennis Mochan	FB	(Scotland)	Falkirk	12 December 1935 (aged 30)	0	0	(England) Nottingham Forest	24 September 1966 (Note: Date of signing refers to the date of the player's first game for the club)	Free transfer
Ray Price	FB	(England)	Hetton-le-Hole	18 May 1944 (aged 22)	16	0	(England) Norwich City	Summer 1964	Free transfer
David Raine	FB	(England)	Darlington	28 March 1937 (aged 29)	25	0	(England) Doncaster Rovers	1 June 1965	Nominal
Midfielders
Bobby Blackwood	MF	(Scotland)	Edinburgh	20 August 1934 (aged 31)	45	5	(England) Ipswich Town	1 June 1965	Free transfer
David Buck	WH	(England)	Colchester	25 August 1946 (aged 18)	1	0	Apprentice	16 October 1965	Free transfer
Dave Lamont	MF	(Scotland)	Glasgow	2 April 1949 (aged 17)	0	0	Apprentice	July 1965	Free transfer
John Mansfield	MF	(England)	Colchester	13 September 1946 (aged 19)	8	1	Apprentice	August 1964	Free transfer
Derek Trevis	MF	(England)	Birmingham	9 September 1942 (aged 23)	107	11	(England) Aston Villa	7 March 1964	Free transfer
Forwards
Peter Barlow	FW	(England)	Portsmouth	9 January 1950 (aged 16)	0	0	Apprentice	September 1965	Free transfer
Peter Bullock	FW	(England)	Stoke-on-Trent	17 November 1941 (aged 24)	36	11	(England) Southend United	30 October 1965	Nominal
Ken Hodgson	FW	(England)	Newcastle upon Tyne	19 January 1942 (aged 24)	0	0	(England) Bournemouth	20 August 1966	£4,000
Johnny Martin	WG	(England)	Ashington	4 December 1946 (aged 19)	0	0	(England) Aston Villa	20 August 1966	Free transfer
Alan Shires	WG	(England)	Leigh-on-Sea	29 June 1948 (aged 17)	0	0	(England) Southend United	27 August 1966	Free transfer
Reg Stratton	FW	(England)	Kingsley	10 July 1939 (aged 26)	39	21	(England) Fulham	28 May 1965	Free transfer
Brian Westlake	CF	(England)	Newcastle-under-Lyme	19 September 1943 (aged 22)	0	0	(England) Tranmere Rovers	February 1967	Nominal

== Transfers ==
=== In ===
Date	Position	Nationality	Name	From	Fee	Ref.
20 August 1966	FW	(England)	Ken Hodgson	(England) Bournemouth & Boscombe Athletic	£4,000	(Note: Date of signing refers to the date of the player's first game for the club)
20 August 1966	WG	(England)	Johnny Martin	(England) Aston Villa	Free transfer	
27 August 1966	WG	(England)	Alan Shires	(England) Southend United	Free transfer	
24 September 1966	FB	(Scotland)	Dennis Mochan	(England) Nottingham Forest	Free transfer	
February 1967	CF	(England)	Brian Westlake	(England) Tranmere Rovers	Nominal	
April 1967	CB	(England)	Alan Dennis	Apprentice	Free transfer	

- Total spending: ▼ ~ £4,000

=== Out ===
Date	Position	Nationality	Name	To	Fee	Ref.
End of season	FB	(England)	David Laitt	(England) Crittall Athletic	Released	
End of season	WG	(England)	John Hornsby	(England) South Shields	Released	
End of season	IF	(England)	Ted Phillips	(Malta) Floriana	Player-manager	
28 May 1966	FB	(Scotland)	John Fowler	(England) Heybridge Swifts	Player-manager	(Note: Date of departure refers to the date of the player's final game for the club)
28 May 1966	WG	(England)	Barrie Aitchison	(England) Cambridge City	Released	
31 May 1966	IF	(England)	Dennis Barrett	Free agent	Released	
August 1966	WG	(England)	Mike Grice	(England) Lowestoft Town	Released	
11 February 1967	WG	(England)	Arthur Kaye	Free agent	Retired	

== Match details ==
=== Third Division ===
==== Results round by round ====
Round	1	2	3	4	5	6	7	8	9	10	11	12	13	14	15	16	17	18	19	20	21	22	23	24	25	26	27	28	29	30	31	32	33	34	35	36	37	38	39	40	41	42	43	44	45	46
Ground	H	A	H	A	H	A	H	H	A	A	H	H	A	H	A	H	A	A	A	H	A	A	H	H	A	H	A	A	H	A	H	A	H	H	H	H	A	H	A	H	H	A	H	A	A	H
Result	L	L	W	D	W	D	W	W	L	W	W	D	L	W	L	L	D	L	W	L	L	D	W	W	L	L	L	L	L	L	W	W	D	W	W	D	L	W	L	D	W	D	L	L	D	W
Position	18	22	19	16	13	12	10	7	8	7	5	5	8	5	6	12	10	14	12	14	16	18	13	13	14	16	16	17	18	19	17	14	17	13	10	10	13	12	12	11	11	12	14	16	14	12

Source: 11v11.com
A = Away; H = Home; W = Win; D = Draw; L = Loss

==== League table ====
Pos	Team	Pld	W	D	L	GF	GA	GAv	Pts
11	Gillingham	46	15	16	15	58	62	0.935	46
12	Walsall	46	18	10	18	65	72	0.903	46
13	Colchester United	46	17	10	19	76	73	1.041	44
14	Orient	46	13	18	15	58	68	0.853	44
15	Peterborough United	46	14	15	17	66	71	0.930	43

==== Matches ====
20 August 1966 1	Colchester United	2–3	Middlesbrough	Colchester
	Bullock; Stratton	Report; Report	O'Rourke; Lawson	Stadium: Layer Road; Attendance: 4,385

27 August 1966 2	Shrewsbury Town	2–1	Colchester United	Shrewsbury
	Unknown goalscorer	Report	Stratton	Stadium: Gay Meadow; Attendance: 4,819

3 September 1966 3	Colchester United	2–1	Watford	Colchester
	Hodgson 15'; Stratton 55' (pen.)	Report	Garbett 70'	Stadium: Layer Road; Attendance: 4,232

6 September 1966 4	Swindon Town	1–1	Colchester United	Swindon
	Rogers 16'	Report; Report	Hodgson 11'	Stadium: County Ground; Attendance: 11,600

10 September 1966 5	Colchester United	3–1	Bristol Rovers	Colchester
	Own goal (o.g.); Hodgson; Stratton	Report	Unknown goalscorer	Stadium: Layer Road; Attendance: 4,736

17 September 1966 6	Oxford United	1–1	Colchester United	Oxford
	Unknown goalscorer	Report	Hodgson	Stadium: Manor Ground; Attendance: 6,503

24 September 1966 7	Colchester United	3–2	Oldham Athletic	Colchester
	Own goal (o.g.); Hodgson	Report	Unknown goalscorer	Stadium: Layer Road; Attendance: 5,921

26 September 1966 8	Colchester United	2–1	Swindon Town	Colchester
	Forbes; Hodgson 68'	Report; Report	Willie Penman 45'	Stadium: Layer Road; Attendance: 7,874

30 September 1966 9	Scunthorpe United	3–1	Colchester United	Scunthorpe
	Unknown goalscorer	Report	Stratton	Stadium: Old Showground; Attendance: 5,222

8 October 1966 10	Reading	2–3	Colchester United	Reading
	Webb 80'; Harris (pen.)	Report	Martin 3'; Shires 16', 90'	Stadium: Elm Park; Attendance: 7,213

15 October 1966 11	Colchester United	5–0	Doncaster Rovers	Colchester
	Hodgson; Bullock; Stratton	Report		Stadium: Layer Road; Attendance: 6,461

17 October 1966 12	Colchester United	2–2	Orient	Colchester
	Stratton	Report	Unknown goalscorer	Stadium: Layer Road; Attendance: 8,969

22 October 1966 13	Mansfield Town	2–0	Colchester United	Mansfield
	Unknown goalscorer	Report		Stadium: Field Mill; Attendance: 6,028

29 October 1966 14	Colchester United	4–0	Grimsby Town	Colchester
	Hodgson; Bullock; Stratton	Report		Stadium: Layer Road; Attendance: 6,330

4 November 1966 15	Walsall	1–0	Colchester United	Walsall
	Unknown goalscorer	Report		Stadium: Fellows Park; Attendance: 8,192

12 November 1966 16	Colchester United	1–4	Peterborough United	Colchester
	Hodgson	Report; Report	Fairbrother; Mason	Stadium: Layer Road; Attendance: 6,353

14 November 1966 17	Orient	3–3	Colchester United	Leyton
	Unknown goalscorer	Report	Hodgson; Stratton	Stadium: Brisbane Road; Attendance: 5,714

19 November 1966 18	Torquay United	5–0	Colchester United	Torquay
	Unknown goalscorer	Report		Stadium: Plainmoor; Attendance: 5,056

3 December 1966 19	Darlington	0–4	Colchester United	Darlington
		Report	Mansfield; Martin; Stratton	Stadium: Feethams; Attendance: 5,706

10 December 1966 20	Colchester United	1–3	Queens Park Rangers	Colchester
	Stratton	Report	Unknown goalscorer	Stadium: Layer Road; Attendance: 8,195

17 December 1966 21	Middlesbrough	4–0	Colchester United	Middlesbrough
	O'Rourke; Horsfield	Report; Report		Stadium: Ayresome Park; Attendance: 8,891

26 December 1966 22	Bournemouth & Boscombe Athletic	1–1	Colchester United	Bournemouth
	Unknown goalscorer	Report	Martin	Stadium: Dean Court; Attendance: 5,478

27 December 1966 23	Colchester United	2–0	Bournemouth & Boscombe Athletic	Colchester
	Hodgson; Bullock	Report		Stadium: Layer Road; Attendance: 6,140

31 December 1966 24	Colchester United	3–1	Shrewsbury Town	Colchester
	Hodgson; Bullock; Stratton	Report	Unknown goalscorer	Stadium: Layer Road; Attendance: 4,980

14 January 1967 25	Bristol Rovers	4–1	Colchester United	Bristol
	Unknown goalscorer	Report	Stratton	Stadium: Eastville Stadium; Attendance: 15,415

21 January 1967 26	Colchester United	1–2	Oxford United	Colchester
	Stratton	Report	Unknown goalscorer	Stadium: Layer Road; Attendance: 4,755

28 January 1967 27	Workington	1–0	Colchester United	Workington
	Unknown goalscorer	Report		Stadium: Borough Park; Attendance: 2,589

4 February 1967 28	Oldham Athletic	4–0	Colchester United	Oldham
	Unknown goalscorer	Report		Stadium: Boundary Park; Attendance: 8,961

11 February 1967 29	Colchester United	0–1	Scunthorpe United	Colchester
		Report	Unknown goalscorer	Stadium: Layer Road; Attendance: 3,965

18 February 1967 30	Gillingham	2–1	Colchester United	Gillingham
	Unknown goalscorer	Report	Stratton	Stadium: Priestfield Stadium; Attendance: 6,147

25 February 1967 31	Colchester United	2–0	Reading	Colchester
	Westlake 17'; Stratton 40'	Report		Stadium: Layer Road; Attendance: 4,331

3 March 1967 32	Doncaster Rovers	1–4	Colchester United	Doncaster
	Unknown goalscorer	Report	Westlake; Martin (pen.); Stratton	Stadium: Belle Vue; Attendance: 8,481

11 March 1967 33	Colchester United	0–0	Gillingham	Colchester
		Report		Stadium: Layer Road; Attendance: 4,915

18 March 1967 34	Colchester United	3–0	Mansfield Town	Colchester
	Westlake; Martin; Bullock	Report		Stadium: Layer Road; Attendance: 4,175

24 March 1967 35	Colchester United	3–1	Swansea Town	Colchester
	Hodgson; Bullock	Report	Unknown goalscorer	Stadium: Layer Road; Attendance: 7,277

25 March 1967 36	Colchester United	0–0	Grimsby Town	Colchester
		Report		Stadium: Layer Road; Attendance: 4,487

27 March 1967 37	Swansea Town	1–0	Colchester United	Swansea
	Unknown goalscorer	Report		Stadium: Vetch Field; Attendance: 5,748

1 April 1967 38	Colchester United	5–1	Walsall	Colchester
	Westlake; Martin; Bullock	Report	Unknown goalscorer	Stadium: Layer Road; Attendance: 4,809

8 April 1967 39	Peterborough United	2–1	Colchester United	Peterborough
	Watson; Byrne	Report; Report	Hodgson	Stadium: London Road Stadium; Attendance: 5,362

10 April 1967 40	Colchester United	2–2	Workington	Colchester
	Hodgson; Bullock	Report	Unknown goalscorer	Stadium: Layer Road; Attendance: 4,767

15 April 1967 41	Colchester United	1–0	Torquay United	Colchester
	Stratton	Report		Stadium: Layer Road; Attendance: 5,672

22 April 1967 42	Brighton & Hove Albion	1–1	Colchester United	Hove
	Gould	Report	Stratton	Stadium: Goldstone Ground; Attendance: 10,567

29 April 1967 43	Colchester United	2–3	Darlington	Colchester
	Martin; Stratton	Report	Unknown goalscorer	Stadium: Layer Road; Attendance: 4,578

6 May 1967 44	Queens Park Rangers	2–1	Colchester United	Shepherd's Bush
	Unknown goalscorer	Report	Hall	Stadium: Loftus Road; Attendance: 10,935

9 May 1967 45	Watford	0–0	Colchester United	Watford
		Report		Stadium: Vicarage Road; Attendance: 20,169

13 May 1967 46	Colchester United	3–2	Brighton & Hove Albion	Colchester
	Bullock	Report	Livesey; Turner	Stadium: Layer Road; Attendance: 4,238

=== League Cup ===
23 August 1966 1st round	Queens Park Rangers	5–0	Colchester United	Shepherd's Bush
	Marsh 23', 37', 40', 53'; Lazarus	Report		Stadium: Loftus Road; Attendance: 5,497

=== FA Cup ===
26 November 1966 1st round	Gainsborough Trinity	0–1	Colchester United	Gainsborough
		Report	Hall	Stadium: The Northolme; Attendance: 3,968

7 January 1966 2nd round	Colchester United	0–3	Peterborough United	Colchester
		Report; Report	Watson; Fairbrother	Stadium: Layer Road; Attendance: 9,081

== Squad statistics ==
=== Appearances and goals ===
No.	Pos	Nat	Player	Total		Third Division		FA Cup		League Cup	
No.	Pos	Nat	Player	Apps	Goals	Apps	Goals	Apps	Goals	Apps	Goals
	GK	(England) ENG	Alan Buck	26	0	25	0	0	0	1	0
	GK	(South Africa) RSA	Sandy Kennon	23	0	21	0	2	0	0	0
	DF	(Scotland) SCO	Duncan Forbes	49	1	46	1	2	0	1	0
	DF	(England) ENG	Brian Hall	48	2	45	1	2	1	1	0
	DF	(England) ENG	Mick Loughton	25	0	23	0	1	0	1	0
	DF	(Scotland) SCO	Dennis Mochan	35	0	31+3	0	1	0	0	0
	DF	(England) ENG	Ray Price	1	0	0+1	0	0	0	0	0
	DF	(England) ENG	David Raine	27	0	25+1	0	1	0	0	0
	MF	(Scotland) SCO	Bobby Blackwood	22	0	20	0	1	0	1	0
	MF	(England) ENG	John Mansfield	8	2	7+1	2	0	0	0	0
	MF	(England) ENG	Derek Trevis	48	0	45	0	2	0	1	0
	FW	(England) ENG	Peter Barlow	4	0	3+1	0	0	0	0	0
	FW	(England) ENG	Peter Bullock	43	15	40+1	15	1	0	1	0
	FW	(England) ENG	Ken Hodgson	47	16	44	16	2	0	1	0
	FW	(England) ENG	Johnny Martin	49	8	46	8	2	0	1	0
	FW	(England) ENG	Alan Shires	17	2	15	2	1	0	0+1	0
	FW	(England) ENG	Reg Stratton	49	24	46	24	2	0	1	0
	FW	(England) ENG	Brian Westlake	15	5	14+1	5	0	0	0	0
Players who appeared for Colchester who left during the season
	FW	(England) ENG	Arthur Kaye	14	0	10+1	0	2	0	1	0

=== Goalscorers ===
Place	Nationality	Position	Name	Third Division	FA Cup	League Cup	Total
1	(England)	FW	Reg Stratton	24	0	0	24
2	(England)	FW	Ken Hodgson	16	0	0	16
3	(England)	FW	Peter Bullock	15	0	0	15
4	(England)	WG	Johnny Martin	8	0	0	8
5	(England)	CF	Brian Westlake	5	0	0	5
6	(England)	LB	Brian Hall	1	1	0	2
6	(England)	MF	John Mansfield	2	0	0	2
6	(England)	WG	Alan Shires	2	0	0	2
9	(Scotland)	CB	Duncan Forbes	1	0	0	1
			Own goals	2	0	0	2
			TOTALS	76	1	0	77

=== Clean sheets ===
Number of games goalkeepers kept a clean sheet.

Place	Nationality	Player	Third Division	FA Cup	League Cup	Total
1	(South Africa)	Sandy Kennon	7	1	0	8
2	(England)	Alan Buck	3	0	0	3
		TOTALS	10	1	0	11

=== Player debuts ===
Players making their first-team Colchester United debut in a fully competitive match.

Position	Nationality	Player	Date	Opponent	Ground	Notes
FW	(England)	Ken Hodgson	20 August 1966	Middlesbrough	Layer Road	
WG	(England)	Johnny Martin	20 August 1966	Middlesbrough	Layer Road	
WG	(England)	Alan Shires	23 August 1966	Queens Park Rangers	Loftus Road	
FB	(Scotland)	Dennis Mochan	24 September 1966	Oldham Athletic	Layer Road	
FW	(England)	Peter Barlow	27 December 1966	Bournemouth & Boscombe Athletic	Layer Road	
CF	(England)	Brian Westlake	18 February 1967	Gillingham	Priestfield Stadium	

== See also ==
- List of Colchester United F.C. seasons
