= 1965–66 Colchester United F.C. season =

Colchester United
1965–66 season
- Chairman: Bill Allen
- Manager: Neil Franklin
- Stadium: Layer Road
- Fourth Division: 4th (promoted)
- FA Cup: 1st round (eliminated by Queens Park Rangers)
- League Cup: 2nd round (eliminated by Middlesbrough)
- Top goalscorer: League: Reg Stratton (18); All: Reg Stratton (21)
- Highest home attendance: 10,200 v Luton Town, 8 April 1966
- Lowest home attendance: 2,768 v Notts County, 22 November 1965
- Average home league attendance: 5,225
- Biggest win: 4–0 v Barnsley, 11 September 1965
- Biggest defeat: 0–4 v Queens Park Rangers, 18 November 1965
Home colours

The 1965–66 season was Colchester United's 24th season in their history and their first back in the fourth tier of English football, the Fourth Division, following relegation the previous season. Alongside competing in the Fourth Division, the club also participated in the FA Cup and the League Cup.

Colchester were immediately promoted back to the Third Division after ending the season in fourth position. Queens Park Rangers handed Colchester another early FA Cup exit following a replay, while Middlesbrough knocked the U's out of the League Cup in the second round.

== Season overview ==
Neil Franklin brought in forward Reg Stratton to lead the line for the new season and he responded with 18 league goals and 21 in total. They won ten times on their travels, setting a new club record, while losing just three times at Layer Road. After leading the Fourth Division table across Easter, subsequent defeats to promotion rivals Darlington on two occasions and Torquay United saw Colchester drop to fourth position ahead of the final game of the season. A 2–1 defeat to Newport County left fans awaiting the result of Luton Town's game with Chester with Luton just one point behind and the game kicking off 15-minutes later than the U's fixture. The game finished 1–1 with Colchester, Luton, and Tranmere Rovers all tied on 56 points. Goal average would separate the sides, with Franklin's side pipping Tranmere to the final promotion spot by 0.08.

As the club did four years prior, the U's bounced back from the Fourth Division at the first attempt. The season was also notable as player replacements were allowed for the first time. Ray Price became Colchester's first substitute when he came on to replace the injured Ted Phillips after 85-minutes of their 2–0 home win over Rochdale on 18 September.

== Players ==
As of match played 28 May 1966.

Name	Position	Nationality	Place of birth	Date of birth	Apps	Goals	Signed from	Date signed	Fee
Goalkeepers
Alan Buck	GK	(England)	Colchester	25 August 1946 (aged 18)	11	0	Amateur	July 1963	Free transfer
Sandy Kennon	GK	(South Africa)	Johannesburg	28 November 1933 (aged 31)	10	0	(England) Norwich City	March 1965	Free transfer
Defenders
Duncan Forbes	CB	(Scotland)	Edinburgh	19 June 1941 (aged 23)	141	0	(Scotland) Musselburgh Athletic	4 September 1961	Nominal
John Fowler	FB	(Scotland)	Leith	17 October 1933 (aged 31)	412	5	(Scotland) Bonnyrigg Rose Athletic	20 August 1955 (Note: Date of signing refers to the date of the player's first game for the club)	Free transfer
Brian Hall	LB	(England)	Burbage	9 March 1939 (aged 26)	10	1	(England) Mansfield Town	March 1965	Free transfer
David Laitt	FB	(England)	Colchester	1 November 1946 (aged 18)	0	0	Amateur	Summer 1962	Free transfer
Mick Loughton	CB	(England)	Colchester	8 December 1942 (aged 22)	28	1	Amateur	August 1961	Free transfer
Ray Price	FB	(England)	Hetton-le-Hole	18 May 1944 (aged 21)	11	0	(England) Norwich City	Summer 1964	Free transfer
David Raine	FB	(England)	Darlington	28 March 1937 (aged 28)	0	0	(England) Doncaster Rovers	1 June 1965	Nominal
Midfielders
Bobby Blackwood	MF	(Scotland)	Edinburgh	20 August 1934 (aged 30)	0	0	(England) Ipswich Town	1 June 1965	Free transfer
David Buck	WH	(England)	Colchester	25 August 1946 (aged 18)	0	0	Apprentice	16 October 1965	Free transfer
Dave Lamont	MF	(Scotland)	Glasgow	2 April 1949 (aged 16)	0	0	Apprentice	July 1965	Free transfer
John Mansfield	MF	(England)	Colchester	13 September 1946 (aged 18)	1	0	Apprentice	August 1964	Free transfer
Derek Trevis	MF	(England)	Birmingham	9 September 1942 (aged 22)	60	7	(England) Aston Villa	7 March 1964	Free transfer
Forwards
Barrie Aitchison	WG	(England)	Colchester	15 November 1937 (aged 26)	41	4	(England) Tottenham Hotspur	1 August 1964	£750
Peter Barlow	FW	(England)	Portsmouth	9 January 1950 (aged 15)	0	0	Apprentice	September 1965	Free transfer
Dennis Barrett	IF				0	0	Apprentice	Summer 1964	Free transfer
Peter Bullock	FW	(England)	Stoke-on-Trent	17 November 1941 (aged 23)	0	0	(England) Southend United	30 October 1965	Nominal
Mike Grice	WG	(England)	Woking	3 November 1931 (aged 33)	248	30	(England) Coventry City	18 August 1962 (Note: Date of signing refers to the date of the player's first game in his second spell for the club)	£1,000
John Hornsby	WG	(England)	Ferryhill	3 August 1945 (aged 19)	0	0	(England) Evenwood Town	October 1965	£25/5s
Arthur Kaye	WG	(England)	Higham	9 May 1933 (aged 32)	0	0	(England) Middlesbrough	21 August 1965	Free transfer
Ted Phillips	IF	(England)	Leiston	21 August 1933 (aged 31)	0	0	(England) Luton Town	11 September 1965	Part exchange
Reg Stratton	FW	(England)	Kingsley	10 July 1939 (aged 25)	0	0	(England) Fulham	28 May 1965	Free transfer

== Transfers ==
=== In ===
Date	Position	Nationality	Name	From	Fee	Ref.
28 May 1965	FW	(England)	Reg Stratton	(England) Fulham	Free transfer	
1 June 1965	FB	(England)	David Raine	(England) Doncaster Rovers	Nominal	
1 June 1965	MF	(Scotland)	Bobby Blackwood	(England) Ipswich Town	Free transfer	
July 1965	MF	(Scotland)	Dave Lamont	Apprentice	Free transfer	
21 August 1965	WH	(England)	Jackie Bell	(England) Norwich City	Free transfer	(Note: Date of signing refers to the date of the player's first game for the club)
21 August 1965	WG	(England)	Arthur Kaye	(England) Middlesbrough	Free transfer	
September 1965	FW	(England)	Peter Barlow	Apprentice	Free transfer	
11 September 1965	IF	(England)	Ted Phillips	(England) Luton Town	Part exchange with Billy Stark	
October 1965	WG	(England)	John Hornsby	(England) Evenwood Town	£25/5s	
16 October 1965	WH	(England)	David Buck	Apprentice	Free transfer	
30 October 1965	FW	(England)	Peter Bullock	(England) Southend United	Nominal	

- Total spending: ▼ ~ £25/5s

=== Out ===
Date	Position	Nationality	Name	To	Fee	Ref.
End of season	WH	(Scotland)	John Docherty	(England) Chelmsford City	Released	
End of season	FB	(England)	Richie Griffiths	(England) Haverhill Rovers	Released	
End of season	IF	(Wales)	Gareth Salisbury	(England) Chesterfield	Released	
23 April 1965	IF	(Scotland)	Bobby Hill	(England) Bury Town	Released	(Note: Date of departure refers to the date of the player's final game for the club)
23 April 1965	IF	(England)	Arthur Langley	(England) Nottingham Forest	Released	
28 August 1965	FW	(Scotland)	Billy Stark	(England) Luton Town	£1,000 plus Ted Phillips	
October 1965	WH	(Wales)	Tecwyn Jones	(England) Crewe Alexandra	Nominal	
12 February 1966	WH	(England)	Jackie Bell	(England) Gainford Town	Released	

- Total incoming: ▲ ~ £1,000

== Match details ==
=== Fourth Division ===
==== Results round by round ====
Round	1	2	3	4	5	6	7	8	9	10	11	12	13	14	15	16	17	18	19	20	21	22	23	24	25	26	27	28	29	30	31	32	33	34	35	36	37	38	39	40	41	42	43	44	45	46
Ground	A	H	H	A	H	A	H	A	H	A	A	H	H	A	A	H	H	A	H	A	H	A	H	A	H	H	A	A	H	A	H	H	A	H	A	H	H	A	A	H	H	H	A	A	A	A
Result	L	W	D	W	W	D	W	L	W	L	L	W	D	W	W	W	W	L	W	W	D	L	D	L	W	W	W	W	L	D	W	W	W	W	L	D	D	W	D	D	L	L	W	W	L	L
Position	21	10	12	8	4	3	2	4	4	6	9	7	10	7	5	3	4	4	4	3	3	4	4	5	4	4	4	4	4	4	3	2	2	1	1	1	1	1	1	1	2	4	4	2	4	4

Source: 11v11.com
A = Away; H = Home; W = Win; D = Draw; L = Loss

==== League table ====
Pos	Team	Pld	W	D	L	GF	GA	GAv	Pts	Promotion or relegation
2	Darlington (P)	46	25	9	12	72	53	1.358	59	Promotion to the Third Division
3	Torquay United (P)	46	24	10	12	72	49	1.469	58	Promotion to the Third Division
4	Colchester United (P)	46	23	10	13	70	47	1.489	56	Promotion to the Third Division
5	Tranmere Rovers	46	24	8	14	93	66	1.409	56	
6	Luton Town	46	24	8	14	90	70	1.286	56	

Source: rsssf.com
(P) Promoted

==== Matches ====
21 August 1965 1	Port Vale	1–0	Colchester United	Burslem
	Bannister	Report		Stadium: Vale Park; Attendance: 11,212

23 August 1965 2	Colchester United	1–0	Halifax Town	Colchester
	Kaye 83'	Report		Stadium: Layer Road; Attendance: 4,473

28 August 1965 3	Colchester United	1–1	Crewe Alexandra	Colchester
	Stark	Report	Unknown goalscorer	Stadium: Layer Road; Attendance: 4,040

4 September 1965 4	Bradford City	1–2	Colchester United	Bradford
	Thorpe 63'	Report	Stratton 41'; Aitchison 57'	Stadium: Valley Parade; Attendance: 2,692

11 September 1965 5	Colchester United	4–0	Barnsley	Colchester
	Phillips 5', 22', 50'; Aitchison 69'	Report		Stadium: Layer Road; Attendance: 5,082

14 September 1965 6	Halifax Town	1–1	Colchester United	Halifax
	Unknown goalscorer	Report	Stratton	Stadium: The Shay; Attendance: 2,773

18 September 1965 7	Colchester United	2–0	Rochdale	Colchester
	Stratton	Report		Stadium: Layer Road; Attendance: 4,968

24 September 1965 8	Tranmere Rovers	2–0	Colchester United	Birkenhead
	Unknown goalscorer	Report		Stadium: Prenton Park; Attendance: 8,821

2 October 1965 9	Colchester United	3–2	Stockport County	Colchester
	Stratton; Phillips	Report	Haydock; White	Stadium: Layer Road; Attendance: 4,968

7 October 1965 10	Notts County	1–0	Colchester United	Nottingham
	Unknown goalscorer	Report		Stadium: Meadow Lane; Attendance: 5,681

9 October 1965 11	Barrow	3–0	Colchester United	Barrow-in-Furness
	Unknown goalscorer	Report		Stadium: Holker Street; Attendance: 5,378

16 October 1965 12	Colchester United	2–0	Hartlepools United	Colchester
	Stratton 20'; Trevis 44'	Report; Report		Stadium: Layer Road; Attendance: 4,421; Referee: R. Spittle

30 October 1965 13	Colchester United	0–0	Southport	Colchester
		Report; Report		Stadium: Layer Road; Attendance: 4,165; Referee: E. Wallace

6 November 1965 14	Wrexham	2–3	Colchester United	Wrexham
	Unknown goalscorer	Report	Hall; Loughton; Phillips	Stadium: Racecourse Ground; Attendance: 3,743

20 November 1965 15	Aldershot	1–3	Colchester United	Aldershot
	Walden 78'	Report	Phillips 12'; Trevis 12'; Blackwood 25'	Stadium: Recreation Ground; Attendance: 3,097

22 November 1965 16	Colchester United	4–1	Notts County	Colchester
	Bullock 11'; Hall 29'; Forbes 33'; Butler 62' (o.g.)	Report	Still 65'	Stadium: Layer Road; Attendance: 2,768

27 November 1965 17	Colchester United	3–2	Newport County	Colchester
	Hall	Report	Jones; Hale	Stadium: Layer Road; Attendance: 3,593

4 December 1965 18	Doncaster Rovers	2–0	Colchester United	Doncaster
	Unknown goalscorer	Report		Stadium: Belle Vue; Attendance: 6,035

11 December 1965 19	Colchester United	3–0	Chesterfield	Colchester
	Blackwood; Hall; Bullock	Report		Stadium: Layer Road; Attendance: 3,867

18 December 1965 20	Hartlepools United	0–1	Colchester United	Hartlepool
		Report	Phillips	Stadium: Victoria Park; Attendance: 4,067

27 December 1965 21	Colchester United	1–1	Chester	Colchester
	Phillips	Report	Morris	Stadium: Layer Road; Attendance: 7,840

28 December 1965 22	Chester	2–1	Colchester United	Chester
	Jones; Morris	Report	Bullock	Stadium: Sealand Road; Attendance: 8,361

1 January 1966 23	Colchester United	2–2	Barrow	Colchester
	Blackwood; Stratton	Report	Mulholland; Worthington	Stadium: Layer Road; Attendance: 4,676

8 January 1966 24	Bradford Park Avenue	1–0	Colchester United	Bradford
	Unknown goalscorer	Report		Stadium: Park Avenue; Attendance: 5,867

15 January 1966 25	Colchester United	2–1	Doncaster Rovers	Colchester
	Bullock	Report	Unknown goalscorer	Stadium: Layer Road; Attendance: 3,778

29 January 1966 26	Colchester United	3–0	Port Vale	Colchester
	Own goal 25' (o.g.); Phillips 76'; Hornsby 90'	Report		Stadium: Layer Road; Attendance: 4,481

5 February 1966 27	Crewe Alexandra	0–2	Colchester United	Crewe
		Report	Phillips	Stadium: Gresty Road; Attendance: 5,470

12 February 1966 28	Lincoln City	0–2	Colchester United	Lincoln
		Report	Stratton; Phillips	Stadium: Sincil Bank; Attendance: 2,294

19 February 1966 29	Colchester United	0–1	Bradford City	Colchester
		Report	Unknown goalscorer	Stadium: Layer Road; Attendance: 4,936

26 February 1966 30	Barnsley	1–1	Colchester United	Barnsley
	Unknown goalscorer	Report	Hall	Stadium: Oakwell; Attendance: 3,166

28 February 1966 31	Colchester United	6–3	Bradford Park Avenue	Colchester
	Kaye; Trevis; Bullock; Stratton	Report	Unknown goalscorer	Stadium: Layer Road; Attendance: 4,921

5 March 1966 32	Colchester United	3–0	Lincoln City	Colchester
	Hall; Bullock; Phillips	Report		Stadium: Layer Road; Attendance: 5,055

11 March 1966 33	Rochdale	0–1	Colchester United	Rochdale
		Report	Stratton	Stadium: Spotland Stadium; Attendance: 1,780

19 March 1966 34	Colchester United	2–1	Tranmere Rovers	Colchester
	Stratton	Report	Unknown goalscorer	Stadium: Layer Road; Attendance: 6,611

25 March 1966 35	Stockport County	1–0	Colchester United	Stockport
	Clark	Report		Stadium: Edgeley Park; Attendance: 6,500

2 April 1966 36	Colchester United	1–1	Wrexham	Colchester
	Stratton	Report	Unknown goalscorer	Stadium: Layer Road; Attendance: 5,012

8 April 1966 37	Colchester United	2–2	Luton Town	Colchester
	Stratton	Report	Unknown goalscorer	Stadium: Layer Road; Attendance: 10,200

9 April 1966 38	Torquay United	0–1	Colchester United	Torquay
		Report	Aitchison	Stadium: Plainmoor; Attendance: 7,678

11 April 1966 39	Luton Town	1–1	Colchester United	Luton
	Unknown goalscorer	Report	Stratton	Stadium: Kenilworth Road; Attendance: 15,245

16 April 1966 40	Colchester United	0–0	Aldershot	Colchester
		Report		Stadium: Layer Road; Attendance: 5,356

25 April 1966 41	Colchester United	0–1	Darlington	Colchester
		Report	Unknown goalscorer	Stadium: Layer Road; Attendance: 7,353

30 April 1966 42	Colchester United	0–2	Torquay United	Colchester
		Report	Unknown goalscorer	Stadium: Layer Road; Attendance: 5,922

7 May 1966 43	Chesterfield	2–4	Colchester United	Chesterfield
	Unknown goalscorer	Report	Hall; Bullock; Stratton	Stadium: Saltergate; Attendance: 3,943

10 May 1966 44	Southport	0–1	Colchester United	Southport
		Report	Mansfield	Stadium: Haig Avenue; Attendance: 4,983

16 May 1966 45	Darlington	2–0	Colchester United	Darlington
	Unknown goalscorer	Report		Stadium: Feethams; Attendance: 12,474

28 May 1966 46	Newport County	2–1	Colchester United	Newport
	Morgan; Hale	Report	Trevis	Stadium: Somerton Park; Attendance: 2,905

=== League Cup ===
1 September 1965 1st round	Colchester United	2–1	Exeter City	Colchester
	Stratton	Report	Unknown goalscorer	Stadium: Layer Road; Attendance: 2,988

22 September 1965 2nd round	Colchester United	2–4	Middlesbrough	Colchester
	Hall; Stratton	Report; Report	Horner; Irvine; McMordie	Stadium: Layer Road; Attendance: 7,777

=== FA Cup ===
13 November 1965 1st round	Colchester United	3–3	Queens Park Rangers	Colchester
	Hall 27'; Blackwood 35'	Report	Allen 40'; Sanderson 64'; Collins	Stadium: Layer Road; Attendance: 6,693

17 November 1965 1st round replay	Queens Park Rangers	4–0	Colchester United	Shepherd's Bush
	R. Morgan; Allen (2); Sanderson	Report		Stadium: Loftus Road; Attendance: 6,166

== Squad statistics ==
=== Appearances and goals ===
No.	Pos	Nat	Player	Total		Fourth Division		FA Cup		League Cup	
No.	Pos	Nat	Player	Apps	Goals	Apps	Goals	Apps	Goals	Apps	Goals
	GK	(South Africa) RSA	Sandy Kennon	50	0	46	0	2	0	2	0
	DF	(Scotland) SCO	Duncan Forbes	46	1	42	1	2	0	2	0
	DF	(Scotland) SCO	John Fowler	27	0	25	0	2	0	0	0
	DF	(England) ENG	Brian Hall	50	11	46	9	2	1	2	1
	DF	(England) ENG	David Laitt	1	0	0+1	0	0	0	0	0
	DF	(England) ENG	Mick Loughton	49	1	45	1	2	0	2	0
	DF	(England) ENG	Ray Price	5	0	4+1	0	0	0	0	0
	DF	(England) ENG	David Raine	25	0	19+3	0	2	0	1	0
	MF	(Scotland) SCO	Bobby Blackwood	45	5	41	3	2	2	2	0
	MF	(England) ENG	David Buck	1	0	0+1	0	0	0	0	0
	MF	(England) ENG	John Mansfield	7	1	5+2	1	0	0	0	0
	MF	(England) ENG	Derek Trevis	47	4	43	4	2	0	2	0
	FW	(England) ENG	Barrie Aitchison	15	3	13+1	3	0	0	1	0
	FW	(England) ENG	Peter Bullock	36	11	34	11	2	0	0	0
	FW	(England) ENG	Mike Grice	15	0	12+1	0	0	0	2	0
	FW	(England) ENG	John Hornsby	12	1	11	1	0	0	1	0
	FW	(England) ENG	Arthur Kaye	42	2	38	2	2	0	2	0
	FW	(England) ENG	Ted Phillips	34	13	32	13	2	0	0	0
	FW	(England) ENG	Reg Stratton	39	21	37	18	0	0	2	3
Players who appeared for Colchester who left during the season
	MF	(England) ENG	Jackie Bell	7	0	7	0	0	0	0	0
	MF	(Wales) WAL	Tecwyn Jones	4	0	3	0	0	0	1	0
	FW	(Scotland) SCO	Billy Stark	3	1	3	1	0	0	0	0

=== Goalscorers ===
Place	Nationality	Position	Name	Fourth Division	FA Cup	League Cup	Total
1	(England)	FW	Reg Stratton	18	0	3	21
2	(England)	IF	Ted Phillips	13	0	0	13
3	(England)	FW	Peter Bullock	11	0	0	11
3	(England)	LB	Brian Hall	9	1	1	11
5	(Scotland)	MF	Bobby Blackwood	3	2	0	5
6	(England)	MF	Derek Trevis	4	0	0	4
7	(England)	WG	Barrie Aitchison	3	0	0	3
8	(England)	WG	Arthur Kaye	2	0	0	2
9	(Scotland)	CB	Duncan Forbes	1	0	0	1
9	(England)	WG	John Hornsby	1	0	0	1
9	(England)	CB	Mick Loughton	1	0	0	1
9	(England)	MF	John Mansfield	1	0	0	1
9	(Scotland)	FW	Billy Stark	1	0	0	1
			Own goals	2	0	0	2
			TOTALS	70	3	4	77

=== Clean sheets ===
Number of games goalkeepers kept a clean sheet.

Place	Nationality	Player	Fourth Division	FA Cup	League Cup	Total
1	(South Africa)	Sandy Kennon	15	0	0	15
		TOTALS	15	0	0	15

=== Player debuts ===
Players making their first-team Colchester United debut in a fully competitive match.

Position	Nationality	Player	Date	Opponent	Ground	Notes
WH	(England)	Jackie Bell	21 August 1965	Port Vale	Vale Park	
WG	(England)	John Hornsby	21 August 1965	Port Vale	Vale Park	
WG	(England)	Arthur Kaye	21 August 1965	Port Vale	Vale Park	
FW	(England)	Reg Stratton	21 August 1965	Port Vale	Vale Park	
MF	(Scotland)	Bobby Blackwood	1 September 1965	Exeter City	Layer Road	
IF	(England)	Ted Phillips	11 September 1965	Barnsley	Layer Road	
FB	(England)	David Raine	22 September 1965	Middlesbrough	Layer Road	
WH	(England)	David Buck	16 October 1965	Hartlepools United	Layer Road	
FB	(England)	David Laitt	30 October 1965	Southport	Layer Road	
FW	(England)	Peter Bullock	30 October 1965	Southport	Layer Road	

== See also ==
- List of Colchester United F.C. seasons
