= 1967–68 Colchester United F.C. season =

Colchester United
1967–68 season
- Chairman: Harold Moore (until January); Arthur Neville (from January)
- Manager: Neil Franklin
- Stadium: Layer Road
- Third Division: 22nd (relegated)
- FA Cup: 3rd round (eliminated by West Bromwich Albion)
- League Cup: 1st round (eliminated by Brighton & Hove Albion)
- Top goalscorer: League: Reg Stratton (9); All: Reg Stratton (11)
- Highest home attendance: 15,981 v West Bromwich Albion, 27 January 1968
- Lowest home attendance: 2,483 v Peterborough United, 11 May 1968
- Average home league attendance: 4,591
- Biggest win: 2–0 v Bristol Rovers, 23 December 1967 v Chelmsford City, 6 January 1968
- Biggest defeat: 0–5 v Barrow, 13 November 1967
Home colours

The 1967–68 season was Colchester United's 26th season in their history and their second successive season in the third tier of English football, the Third Division. Alongside competing in the Third Division, the club also participated in the FA Cup and the League Cup.

Colchester were relegated to the Fourth Division after a two–year stay in the Third Division. They succumbed following 15 defeats in 22 games, recording just one win during this time. Manager Neil Franklin was sacked two days after the season ending 5–1 home defeat by Peterborough United. They fared better in the FA Cup, earning a third round replay against First Division West Bromwich Albion where they were defeated 4–0, but exited the League Cup in the first round, beaten by Brighton & Hove Albion by the same scoreline.

== Season overview ==
Colchester's league and FA Cup form contrasted during the 1967–68 season. A trip to Torquay United in the first round of the Cup saw the U's earn a replay at home, where they won 2–1. Essex rivals Chelmsford City were beaten 2–0 in the second round, a joint–best result for the campaign for Colchester. Layer Road then played host to First Division West Bromwich Albion in front of a crowd just short of 16,000. With the score at 1–1, both goalscorer Reg Stratton and John Mansfield had goals ruled out for infringements late on as the tie went to a replay. The U's lost 4–0 at The Hawthorns to the eventual Cup winners.

With the attention on Colchester's cup run, their league form had dropped significantly. After challenging for the promotion positions, Colchester lost 15 of their remaining 22 games after Boxing Day, winning just once. A new all-time record low attendance of 2,483 watched the final day 5–1 defeat by Peterborough United at Layer Road.

With Colchester relegated, and their third relegation in eight seasons, manager Neil Franklin was sacked two days after the season-ending defeat to Peterborough.

== Players ==
As of match played 11 May 1968.

Name	Position	Nationality	Place of birth	Date of birth	Apps	Goals	Signed from	Date signed	Fee
Goalkeepers
Ernie Adams	GK	(England)	Hackney	17 January 1948 (aged 19)	0	0	(England) Arsenal	1 July 1967	Free transfer
Alan Buck	GK	(England)	Colchester	25 August 1946 (aged 20)	37	0	Amateur	July 1963	Free transfer
Defenders
Alan Dennis	CB	(England)	Colchester	22 February 1951 (aged 16)	0	0	Apprentice	April 1967	Free transfer
Duncan Forbes	CB	(Scotland)	Edinburgh	19 June 1941 (aged 25)	236	2	(Scotland) Musselburgh Athletic	4 September 1961	Nominal
Brian Hall	LB	(England)	Burbage	9 March 1939 (aged 28)	108	14	(England) Mansfield Town	March 1965	Free transfer
Mick Loughton	CB	(England)	Colchester	8 December 1942 (aged 24)	102	2	Amateur	August 1961	Free transfer
Dennis Mochan	FB	(Scotland)	Falkirk	12 December 1935 (aged 31)	35	0	(England) Nottingham Forest	24 September 1966 (Note: Date of signing refers to the date of the player's first game for the club)	Free transfer
Bob Walker	CB	(England)	Wallsend	23 July 1942 (aged 24)	0	0	(England) Bournemouth	7 October 1967	Free transfer
Midfielders
Bobby Blackwood	MF	(Scotland)	Edinburgh	20 August 1934 (aged 32)	67	5	(England) Ipswich Town	1 June 1965	Free transfer
David Buck	WH	(England)	Colchester	25 August 1946 (aged 18)	1	0	Apprentice	16 October 1965	Free transfer
Roger Joslyn	MF	(England)	Colchester	7 May 1950 (aged 17)	0	0	Apprentice	23 December 1967	Free transfer
John Mansfield	MF	(England)	Colchester	13 September 1946 (aged 20)	16	3	Apprentice	August 1964	Free transfer
Derek Trevis	MF	(England)	Birmingham	9 September 1942 (aged 24)	155	11	(England) Aston Villa	7 March 1964	Free transfer
Forwards
Peter Barlow	FW	(England)	Portsmouth	9 January 1950 (aged 17)	4	0	Apprentice	September 1965	Free transfer
Peter Bullock	FW	(England)	Stoke-on-Trent	17 November 1941 (aged 25)	79	26	(England) Southend United	30 October 1965	Nominal
Ken Hodgson	FW	(England)	Newcastle upon Tyne	19 January 1942 (aged 25)	47	16	(England) Bournemouth	20 August 1966	£4,000
Johnny Martin	WG	(England)	Ashington	4 December 1946 (aged 20)	49	8	(England) Aston Villa	20 August 1966	Free transfer
Jim Oliver	FW	(Scotland)	Falkirk	3 December 1941 (aged 25)	0	0	(England) Brighton & Hove Albion	January 1968	£2,000
Terry Price	WG	(England)	Colchester	11 October 1945 (aged 21)	0	0	(England) Orient	16 September 1967	£2,000
Alan Shires	WG	(England)	Leigh-on-Sea	29 June 1948 (aged 18)	17	2	(England) Southend United	27 August 1966	Free transfer
Reg Stratton	FW	(England)	Kingsley	10 July 1939 (aged 27)	88	45	(England) Fulham	28 May 1965	Free transfer

== Transfers ==
=== In ===
Date	Position	Nationality	Name	From	Fee	Ref.
1 July 1967	GK	(England)	Ernie Adams	(England) Arsenal	Free transfer	
23 December 1967	MF	(England)	Roger Joslyn	Apprentice	Free transfer	(Note: Date of signing refers to the date of the player's first game for the club)
9 September 1967	FB	(Scotland)	John Fowler	Free agent	Free transfer	
16 September 1967	FW	(Scotland)	Tommy McKechnie	(England) Bournemouth & Boscombe Athletic	Free transfer	
16 September 1967	WG	(England)	Terry Price	(England) Orient	£2,000	
7 October 1967	CB	(England)	Bob Walker	(England) Bournemouth & Boscombe Athletic	Free transfer	
January 1968	FW	(Scotland)	Jim Oliver	(England) Brighton & Hove Albion	£2,000	

- Total spending: ▼ ~ £4,000

=== Out ===
Date	Position	Nationality	Name	To	Fee	Ref.
End of season	GK	(South Africa)	Sandy Kennon	(England) Lowestoft Town	Released	
End of season	FB	(England)	David Raine	(England) Burton Albion	Released	
Summer 1967	FB	(England)	Ray Price	(England) Chelmsford City	Released	
July 1967	CF	(England)	Brian Westlake	(Belgium) Royal Daring Club de Bruxelles	£5,000	
13 November 1967	FB	(Scotland)	John Fowler	Free agent	Released	
28 February 1968	MF	(Scotland)	Dave Lamont	(England) Eastern Gas	Released	(Note: Date of departure refers to the date of the player's final game for the club)
22 April 1968	FW	(Scotland)	Tommy McKechnie	(England) Bury Town	Free transfer	

- Total incoming: ▲ ~ £5,000

== Match details ==
=== Third Division ===
==== Results round by round ====
Round	1	2	3	4	5	6	7	8	9	10	11	12	13	14	15	16	17	18	19	20	21	22	23	24	25	26	27	28	29	30	31	32	33	34	35	36	37	38	39	40	41	42	43	44	45	46
Ground	H	A	A	H	A	H	A	H	A	H	H	A	H	A	A	H	A	A	H	A	H	A	H	A	H	A	H	H	A	A	H	H	A	A	H	H	A	H	H	A	A	H	A	A	H	H
Result	D	D	W	W	L	D	W	D	L	W	D	L	W	D	L	L	W	L	D	D	W	L	W	L	L	L	L	L	L	D	W	L	L	D	L	L	L	L	D	L	L	D	D	D	D	L
Position	12	12	8	5	7	9	6	4	7	5	7	10	8	6	9	16	11	15	15	16	13	16	12	15	16	20	20	20	20	20	19	19	20	22	22	22	22	22	22	22	22	22	22	22	23	23

Source: 11v11.com
A = Away; H = Home; W = Win; D = Draw; L = Loss

==== League table ====
Pos	Team	Pld	W	D	L	GF	GA	GAv	Pts	Promotion or relegation
20	Mansfield Town	46	12	13	21	51	67	0.761	37	
21	Grimsby Town (R)	46	14	9	23	52	69	0.754	37	Relegation to 1968–69 Fourth Division
22	Colchester United (R)	46	9	15	22	50	87	0.575	33	Relegation to 1968–69 Fourth Division
23	Scunthorpe United (R)	46	10	12	24	56	87	0.644	32	Relegation to 1968–69 Fourth Division
24	Peterborough United (R)	46	20	10	16	79	67	1.179	31 (Note: Peterborough deducted 19 points for making irregular payments to players)	Relegation to 1968–69 Fourth Division

Source: rsssf.com
(R) Relegated

==== Matches ====
19 August 1967 1	Colchester United	0–0	Oldham Athletic	Colchester
		Report		Stadium: Layer Road; Attendance: 3,989

26 August 1967 2	Bristol Rovers	1–1	Colchester United	Colchester
	Unknown goalscorer	Report	Hall	Stadium: Layer Road; Attendance: 3,989

4 September 1967 3	Southport	2–3	Colchester United	Southport
	Spence; Redrobe	Report; Report	Hodgson; Bullock	Stadium: Haig Avenue; Attendance: 7,058

5 September 1967 4	Colchester United	3–2	Barrow	Colchester
	Stratton 37'; Bullock 39'; Mochan 54'	Report	Knox 80'; Edwards 86'	Stadium: Layer Road; Attendance: 3,609

9 September 1967 5	Oxford United	3–1	Colchester United	Oxford
	Unknown goalscorer	Report	Hall	Stadium: Manor Ground; Attendance: 5,873

16 September 1967 6	Colchester United	0–0	Bury	Colchester
		Report		Stadium: Layer Road; Attendance: 4,331

23 September 1967 7	Bournemouth & Boscombe Athletic	1–2	Colchester United	Bournemouth
	Pound 7'	Report	McKechnie 6', 70'	Stadium: Dean Court; Attendance: 5,766

25 September 1967 8	Colchester United	1–1	Southport	Colchester
	Bullock	Report; Report	Andrews	Stadium: Layer Road; Attendance: 5,873

29 September 1967 9	Tranmere Rovers	4–2	Colchester United	Birkenhead
	Unknown goalscorer	Report	Bullock; McKechnie	Stadium: Prenton Park; Attendance: 7,133

2 October 1967 10	Colchester United	2–1	Watford	Colchester
	McKechnie	Report	Garbett	Stadium: Layer Road; Attendance: 6,420

7 October 1967 11	Colchester United	0–0	Brighton & Hove Albion	Colchester
		Report		Stadium: Layer Road; Attendance: 5,075

14 October 1967 12	Shrewsbury Town	4–0	Colchester United	Shrewsbury
	Unknown goalscorer	Report		Stadium: Gay Meadow; Attendance: 4,162

21 October 1967 13	Colchester United	2–1	Swindon Town	Colchester
	Blackwood 60'; Price 77'	Report; Report	Penman 43'	Stadium: Layer Road; Attendance: 4,907

24 October 1967 14	Watford	1–1	Colchester United	Watford
	Garvey	Report	Bullock	Stadium: Vicarage Road; Attendance: 10,669

28 October 1967 15	Reading	1–0	Colchester United	Reading
	Unknown goalscorer	Report		Stadium: Elm Park; Attendance: 5,741

4 November 1967 16	Colchester United	3–5	Torquay United	Colchester
	Shires; Hodgson; Stratton	Report	Unknown goalscorer	Stadium: Layer Road; Attendance: 3,249

11 November 1967 17	Grimsby Town	1–2	Colchester United	Cleethorpes
	Moore 63'	Report	Barlow 61'; Blackwood 77'	Stadium: Blundell Park; Attendance: 3,667

13 November 1967 18	Barrow	5–0	Colchester United	Barrow-in-Furness
	Unknown goalscorer	Report		Stadium: Holker Street; Attendance: 5,685

18 November 1967 19	Colchester United	2–2	Gillingham	Colchester
	Stratton	Report	Unknown goalscorer	Stadium: Layer Road; Attendance: 4,190

25 November 1967 20	Walsall	1–1	Colchester United	Walsall
	Unknown goalscorer	Report	Forbes	Stadium: Fellows Park; Attendance: 10,001

2 December 1967 21	Colchester United	2–1	Northampton Town	Colchester
	Trevis; Price	Report	Unknown goalscorer	Stadium: Layer Road; Attendance: 3,505

16 December 1967 22	Oldham Athletic	2–1	Colchester United	Oldham
	Unknown goalscorer	Report	Barlow	Stadium: Boundary Park; Attendance: 4,177

23 December 1967 23	Colchester United	2–0	Bristol Rovers	Colchester
	Barlow; Stratton	Report		Stadium: Layer Road; Attendance: 4,324

26 December 1967 24	Mansfield Town	2–1	Colchester United	Mansfield
	Unknown goalscorer	Report	Stratton	Stadium: Field Mill; Attendance: 6,679

30 December 1967 25	Colchester United	1–2	Mansfield Town	Colchester
	Stratton	Report	Unknown goalscorer	Stadium: Layer Road; Attendance: 4,180

20 January 1968 26	Bury	2–0	Colchester United	Bury
	Unknown goalscorer	Report		Stadium: Gigg Lane; Attendance: 7,000

3 February 1968 27	Colchester United	0–1	Bournemouth & Boscombe Athletic	Colchester
		Report	Unknown goalscorer	Stadium: Layer Road; Attendance: 4,075

10 February 1968 28	Colchester United	1–2	Tranmere Rovers	Colchester
	Martin	Report	Unknown goalscorer	Stadium: Layer Road; Attendance: 3,739

17 February 1968 29	Peterborough United	3–1	Colchester United	Peterborough
	Thompson; Hall	Report; Report	Loughton	Stadium: London Road Stadium; Attendance: 5,066

24 February 1968 30	Brighton & Hove Albion	0–0	Colchester United	Hove
		Report		Stadium: Goldstone Ground; Attendance: 6,512

26 February 1968 31	Colchester United	1–0	Scunthorpe United	Colchester
	Barlow	Report		Stadium: Layer Road; Attendance: 3,979

2 March 1968 32	Colchester United	0–3	Shrewsbury Town	Colchester
		Report	Unknown goalscorer	Stadium: Layer Road; Attendance: 3,877

9 March 1968 33	Scunthorpe United	5–1	Colchester United	Scunthorpe
	Unknown goalscorer	Report	Mochan	Stadium: Old Showground; Attendance: 3,003

16 March 1968 34	Swindon Town	1–1	Colchester United	Swindon
	Rogers 34'	Report; Report	Martin 40'	Stadium: County Ground; Attendance: 13,515

23 March 1968 35	Colchester United	2–5	Reading	Colchester
	Bullock	Report	Unknown goalscorer	Stadium: Layer Road; Attendance: 3,136

25 March 1968 36	Colchester United	1–2	Oxford United	Colchester
	Stratton	Report	Unknown goalscorer	Stadium: Layer Road; Attendance: 3,516

30 March 1968 37	Torquay United	3–0	Colchester United	Torquay
	Unknown goalscorer	Report		Stadium: Plainmoor; Attendance: 9,801

6 April 1968 38	Colchester United	1–3	Grimsby Town	Colchester
	Blackwood	Report	Unknown goalscorer	Stadium: Layer Road; Attendance: 3,231

12 April 1968 39	Colchester United	1–1	Stockport County	Colchester
	Loughton	Report	Atkins	Stadium: Layer Road; Attendance: 4,059

13 April 1968 40	Gillingham	1–0	Colchester United	Gillingham
	Unknown goalscorer	Report		Stadium: Priestfield Stadium; Attendance: 5,734

15 April 1968 41	Stockport County	1–0	Colchester United	Stockport
	Atkins	Report		Stadium: Edgeley Park; Attendance: 7,149

20 April 1968 42	Colchester United	2–2	Walsall	Colchester
	Loughton	Report	Unknown goalscorer	Stadium: Layer Road; Attendance: 2,764

22 April 1968 43	Orient	1–1	Colchester United	Leyton
	Unknown goalscorer	Report	Stratton	Stadium: Brisbane Road; Attendance: 6,125

27 April 1968 44	Northampton Town	2–2	Colchester United	Northampton
	Unknown goalscorer	Report	Loughton; Price	Stadium: County Ground; Attendance: 6,859

4 May 1968 45	Colchester United	1–1	Orient	Colchester
	Martin	Report	Unknown goalscorer	Stadium: Layer Road; Attendance: 3,124

11 May 1968 46	Colchester United	1–5	Peterborough United	Colchester
	Trevis	Report	Thompson; Conmy; Hall; Garwood	Stadium: Layer Road; Attendance: 2,483

=== League Cup ===
23 August 1967 1st round	Brighton & Hove Albion	4–0	Colchester United	Hove
	Flood; Livesey; Napier	Report		Stadium: Goldstone Ground; Attendance: 10,745

=== FA Cup ===
12 December 1967 1st round	Torquay United	1–1	Colchester United	Torquay
	Unknown goalscorer	Report	Barlow	Stadium: Plainmoor; Attendance: 6,655

18 December 1967 1st round replay	Colchester United	2–1	Torquay United	Colchester
	Trevis	Report	Unknown goalscorer	Stadium: Layer Road; Attendance: 7,079

6 January 1968 2nd round	Chelmsford City	0–2	Colchester United	Chelmsford
		Report	Stratton; McKechnie	Stadium: New Writtle Street; Attendance: 16,400

27 January 1968 3rd round	Colchester United	1–1	West Bromwich Albion	Colchester
	Stratton	Report	Brown pen.'	Stadium: Layer Road; Attendance: 15,981

31 January 1968 3rd round	West Bromwich Albion	4–0	Colchester United	West Bromwich
	Astle; Clark; Kaye	Report		Stadium: The Hawthorns; Attendance: 40,008

== Squad statistics ==
=== Appearances and goals ===
No.	Pos	Nat	Player	Total		Third Division		FA Cup		League Cup	
No.	Pos	Nat	Player	Apps	Goals	Apps	Goals	Apps	Goals	Apps	Goals
	GK	(England) ENG	Ernie Adams	50	0	44	0	5	0	1	0
	GK	(England) ENG	Alan Buck	2	0	2	0	0	0	0	0
	DF	(Scotland) SCO	Duncan Forbes	52	1	46	1	5	0	1	0
	DF	(England) ENG	Brian Hall	46	2	41	2	5	0	0	0
	DF	(England) ENG	Mick Loughton	31	5	28+1	5	1	0	1	0
	DF	(Scotland) SCO	Dennis Mochan	46	2	40	2	5	0	1	0
	DF	(England) ENG	Bob Walker	19	0	13+4	0	0+2	0	0	0
	MF	(Scotland) SCO	Bobby Blackwood	50	3	43+1	3	5	0	1	0
	MF	(England) ENG	Roger Joslyn	12	0	10+2	0	0	0	0	0
	MF	(England) ENG	John Mansfield	21	0	13+2	0	5	0	1	0
	MF	(England) ENG	Derek Trevis	51	4	45	2	5	2	1	0
	FW	(England) ENG	Peter Barlow	18	5	14+2	4	2	1	0	0
	FW	(England) ENG	Peter Bullock	23	7	20	7	1+1	0	1	0
	FW	(England) ENG	Ken Hodgson	13	3	11+1	3	0	0	1	0
	FW	(England) ENG	Johnny Martin	31	3	25	3	5	0	1	0
	FW	(Scotland) SCO	Jim Oliver	15	0	14+1	0	0	0	0	0
	FW	(England) ENG	Terry Price	39	3	35	3	4	0	0	0
	FW	(England) ENG	Alan Shires	8	1	8	1	0	0	0	0
	FW	(England) ENG	Reg Stratton	33	11	29	9	3	2	1	0
Players who appeared for Colchester who left during the season
	DF	(Scotland) SCO	John Fowler	3	0	3	0	0	0	0	0
	MF	(Scotland) SCO	Dave Lamont	1	0	0+1	0	0	0	0	0
	FW	(Scotland) SCO	Tommy McKechnie	27	6	22+1	5	4	1	0	0

=== Goalscorers ===
Place	Nationality	Position	Name	Third Division	FA Cup	League Cup	Total
1	(England)	FW	Reg Stratton	9	2	0	11
2	(England)	FW	Peter Bullock	7	0	0	7
3	(Scotland)	FW	Tommy McKechnie	5	1	0	6
4	(England)	FW	Peter Barlow	4	1	0	5
4	(England)	CB	Mick Loughton	5	0	0	5
6	(England)	MF	Derek Trevis	2	2	0	4
7	(Scotland)	MF	Bobby Blackwood	3	0	0	3
7	(England)	FW	Ken Hodgson	3	0	0	3
7	(England)	WG	Johnny Martin	3	0	0	3
7	(England)	WG	Terry Price	3	0	0	3
11	(England)	LB	Brian Hall	2	0	0	2
11	(Scotland)	FB	Dennis Mochan	2	0	0	2
13	(Scotland)	CB	Duncan Forbes	1	0	0	1
13	(England)	WG	Alan Shires	1	0	0	1
			Own goals	0	0	0	0
			TOTALS	50	6	0	56

=== Clean sheets ===
Number of games goalkeepers kept a clean sheet.

Place	Nationality	Player	Third Division	FA Cup	League Cup	Total
1	(England)	Ernie Adams	6	1	0	7
		TOTALS	6	1	0	7

=== Player debuts ===
Players making their first-team Colchester United debut in a fully competitive match.

Position	Nationality	Player	Date	Opponent	Ground	Notes
GK	(England)	Ernie Adams	19 August 1967	Oldham Athletic	Layer Road	
FB	(Scotland)	John Fowler	9 September 1967	Oxford United	Manor Ground	(Note: Second debut for the club)
FW	(Scotland)	Tommy McKechnie	16 September 1967	Bury	Layer Road	
WG	(England)	Terry Price	16 September 1967	Bury	Layer Road	
CB	(England)	Bob Walker	7 October 1967	Brighton & Hove Albion	Layer Road	
MF	(Scotland)	Dave Lamont	4 November 1967	Torquay United	Layer Road	
MF	(England)	Roger Joslyn	23 December 1967	Bristol Rovers	Layer Road	
FW	(Scotland)	Jim Oliver	24 February 1968	Brighton & Hove Albion	Goldstone Ground	

== See also ==
- List of Colchester United F.C. seasons
