= 1964–65 Colchester United F.C. season =

Colchester United
1964–65 season
- Chairman: Bill Allen
- Manager: Neil Franklin
- Stadium: Layer Road
- Third Division: 23rd (relegated)
- FA Cup: 2nd round (eliminated by Torquay United)
- League Cup: 1st round (eliminated by Torquay United)
- Top goalscorer: League: Billy Stark (13); All: Billy Stark (14)
- Highest home attendance: 6,074 v Peterborough United, 16 April 1965
- Lowest home attendance: 2,218 v Torquay United, 2 September 1964
- Average home league attendance: 3,634
- Biggest win: 4–1 v Barnsley, 9 January 1965
- Biggest defeat: 0–5 v Queens Park Rangers, 26 February 1965
Home colours

The 1964–65 season was Colchester United's 23rd season in their history and their third successive season in the Third Division, the third tier of English football. Alongside competing in the Third Division, the club also participated in the FA Cup and the League Cup.

Neil Franklin's first full season in charge saw an influx of new players, with 14 new arrivals at Layer Road replacing a host of experienced players, including former apprentice Peter Wright and experienced wing half Roy McCrohan. As such, Colchester's form suffered and the club battled against relegation for much of the season. They were eventually relegated after finishing in 23rd-position.

Colchester's fortunes in the cup competitions were no better than the league. They experienced early exits in each cup, twice being eliminated by Torquay United.

== Season overview ==
With manager Neil Franklin looking to make his mark on the Colchester first–team, Roy McCrohan, Keith Rutter and Peter Wright all left the club, and 14 new players arrived across the season. The biggest surprise to United fans was when Wright was not named on the retained list for the season. The former apprentice who had spent his entire career as a part–time professional with Colchester had scored 99 goals in 453 league and cup matches.

Having already sold one half of the previously prolific strike force of Bobby Hunt and Martyn King when Hunt left for Northampton Town earlier in 1964, Franklin sold King to Wrexham in October of the same year, and without their goals, a season of struggle ensued. Colchester could only manage 50 league goals across the season.

Franklin's first–ever signing, Derek Trevis, was an ever–present during the season, as was Duncan Forbes, while Billy Stark ended the season as top scorer with 14 league and cup goals. It was an injury–plagued season for Colchester, with Barrie Aitchison, Mike Grice, Martyn King, Gareth Salisbury and Billy Stark all ruled out as early as September, meaning Franklin had to call upon Noel Kearney, a former Ipswich Town player who had been released by the club three months earlier. Kearney signed on a month–long trial and played three games for Colchester, all of which ended in defeat.

Colchester were relegated back to the Fourth Division with Franklin having already been handed a year's contract extension mid-season. Average attendance hit an all-time low figure of 3,634 and the Supporter's Club could only muster 997 members.

The season was also notable for the introduction of inside-forward Dennis Barrett, Colchester United's first professional apprentice, who was taken on in the summer of 1964.

== Players ==
As of match played 23 April 1965.

| Name | Position | Nationality | Place of birth | Date of birth | Apps | Goals | Signed from | Date signed | Fee |
Goalkeepers
| Alan Buck | GK | (England) | Colchester | 25 August 1946 (aged 17) | 0 | 0 | Amateur | July 1963 | Free transfer |
| Sandy Kennon | GK | (South Africa) | Johannesburg | 28 November 1933 (aged 30) | 0 | 0 | (England) Norwich City | March 1965 | Free transfer |
Defenders
| Duncan Forbes | CB | (Scotland) | Edinburgh | 19 June 1941 (aged 22) | 90 | 0 | (Scotland) Musselburgh Athletic | 4 September 1961 | Nominal |
| John Fowler | FB | (Scotland) | Leith | 17 October 1933 (aged 30) | 372 | 5 | (Scotland) Bonnyrigg Rose Athletic | 20 August 1955 (Note: Date of signing refers to the date of the player's first game for the club) | Free transfer |
| Richie Griffiths | FB | (England) | Earls Colne | 21 March 1942 (aged 22) | 42 | 0 | (England) Colchester Casuals | June 1961 | Free transfer |
| Brian Hall | LB | (England) | Burbage | 9 March 1939 (aged 25) | 0 | 0 | (England) Mansfield Town | March 1965 | Free transfer |
| David Laitt | FB | (England) | Colchester | 1 November 1946 (aged 17) | 0 | 0 | Amateur | Summer 1962 | Free transfer |
| Mick Loughton | CB | (England) | Colchester | 8 December 1942 (aged 21) | 0 | 0 | Amateur | August 1961 | Free transfer |
| Ray Price | FB | (England) | Hetton-le-Hole | 18 May 1944 (aged 20) | 0 | 0 | (England) Norwich City | Summer 1964 | Free transfer |
Midfielders
| John Docherty | WH | (Scotland) | Glasgow | 28 February 1935 (aged 29) | 40 | 1 | (Scotland) Heart of Midlothian | 14 September 1963 | Free transfer |
| Tecwyn Jones | WH | (Wales) | Ruabon | 27 January 1941 (aged 23) | 0 | 0 | (Wales) Wrexham | 1 October 1964 | Part exchange |
| John Mansfield | MF | (England) | Colchester | 13 September 1946 (aged 17) | 0 | 0 | Apprentice | August 1964 | Free transfer |
| Derek Trevis | MF | (England) | Birmingham | 9 September 1942 (aged 21) | 9 | 0 | (England) Aston Villa | 7 March 1964 | Free transfer |
Forwards
| Barrie Aitchison | WG | (England) | Colchester | 15 November 1937 (aged 26) | 0 | 0 | (England) Tottenham Hotspur | 1 August 1964 | £750 |
| Dennis Barrett | IF | | | | 0 | 0 | Apprentice | Summer 1964 | Free transfer |
| Mike Grice | WG | (England) | Woking | 3 November 1931 (aged 32) | 203 | 29 | (England) Coventry City | 18 August 1962 (Note: Date of signing refers to the date of the player's first game in his second spell for the club) | £1,000 |
| Bobby Hill | IF | (Scotland) | Edinburgh | 9 June 1938 (aged 25) | 238 | 22 | (Scotland) Easthouses Lily Miners Welfare | 9 June 1955 | Free transfer |
| John Hornsby | WG | (England) | Ferryhill | 3 August 1945 (aged 18) | 0 | 0 | (England) Evenwood Town | January 1965 | Trial |
| Arthur Langley | IF | (England) | Leeds | 30 January 1933 (aged 31) | 0 | 0 | (England) Oxford United | September 1964 | £1,500 |
| Gareth Salisbury | IF | (Wales) | Caernarfon | 11 March 1941 (aged 23) | 0 | 0 | (England) Luton Town | 22 August 1964 | Free transfer |
| Billy Stark | FW | (Scotland) | Glasgow | 27 May 1937 (aged 27) | 68 | 20 | (England) Carlisle United | November 1962 | £3,750 |

== Transfers ==
=== In ===
| Date | Position | Nationality | Name | From | Fee | Ref. |
|---|---|---|---|---|---|---|
| Summer 1964 | FB | (England) | Ray Price | (England) Norwich City | Free transfer | |
| Summer 1964 | IF | | Dennis Barrett | Apprentice | Free transfer | |
| August 1964 | MF | (England) | John Mansfield | Apprentice | Free transfer | |
| 1 August 1964 | WG | (England) | Barrie Aitchison | (England) Tottenham Hotspur | £750 | |
| 22 August 1964 | CF | (England) | Pat Connolly | (England) Macclesfield Town | £1,200 | (Note: Date of signing refers to the date of the player's first game for the club) |
| 22 August 1964 | IF | (Wales) | Gareth Salisbury | (England) Luton Town | Free transfer | |
| September 1964 | WG | (England) | Noel Kearney | Free agent | Trial | |
| September 1964 | IF | (England) | Arthur Langley | (England) Oxford United | £1,500 | |
| 1 October 1964 | WH | (Wales) | Tecwyn Jones | (Wales) Wrexham | Part exchange with Martyn King | |
| January 1965 | WG | (England) | John Hornsby | (England) Evenwood Town | Trial | |
| March 1965 | GK | (South Africa) | Sandy Kennon | (England) Norwich City | Free transfer | |
| March 1965 | LB | (England) | Brian Hall | (England) Mansfield Town | Free transfer | |

- Total spending: ▼ ~ £3,450

=== Out ===
| Date | Position | Nationality | Name | To | Fee | Ref. |
|---|---|---|---|---|---|---|
| End of season | GK | (Scotland) | George Ramage | (England) Leyton Orient | Released | |
| End of season | WH | (England) | Roy McCrohan | (England) Bristol Rovers | Released | |
| End of season | WG | (England) | Peter Wright | (England) Romford | Released | |
| Summer 1964 | IF | (England) | Tony Miller | (England) Crittall Athletic | Released | |
| August 1964 | CB | (England) | Keith Rutter | (England) Romford | Free transfer | |
| October 1964 | WG | (England) | Noel Kearney | (England) Chelmsford City | End of trial | |
| 1 October 1964 | CF | (England) | Martyn King | (Wales) Wrexham | £3,000 plus Tecwyn Jones | |
| 31 October 1964 | FB | (England) | Edgar Rumney | (England) Sudbury Town | Player-coach | (Note: Date of departure refers to the date of the player's final game for the club) |
| December 1964 | IF | (Australia) | Tommy McColl | (England) Chelsea | Nominal | |
| 26 February 1965 | GK | (England) | Percy Ames | (England) Romford | Free transfer | |
| 16 April 1965 | CF | (England) | Pat Connolly | (England) Altrincham | Released | |

- Total incoming: ▲ ~ £3,000

== Match details ==
=== Friendlies ===
| 8 August 1964 | Colchester United | 1–0 | Romford | Colchester |
| 15:00 BST | Docherty 37' (pen.) | Report | | Stadium: Layer Road; Attendance: 1,500 |

| 15 August 1964 | Norwich City | 5–1 | Colchester United | Norwich |
| 15:00 BST | Davies 13', 74'; Bryceland 54'; Heath 60'; Price 68' (o.g.) | Report | King 37' | Stadium: Carrow Road; Attendance: 3,684 |

=== Third Division ===
==== Results round by round ====
| Round | 1 | 2 | 3 | 4 | 5 | 6 | 7 | 8 | 9 | 10 | 11 | 12 | 13 | 14 | 15 | 16 | 17 | 18 | 19 | 20 | 21 | 22 | 23 | 24 | 25 | 26 | 27 | 28 | 29 | 30 | 31 | 32 | 33 | 34 | 35 | 36 | 37 | 38 | 39 | 40 | 41 | 42 | 43 | 44 | 45 | 46 |
|---|---|---|---|---|---|---|---|---|---|---|---|---|---|---|---|---|---|---|---|---|---|---|---|---|---|---|---|---|---|---|---|---|---|---|---|---|---|---|---|---|---|---|---|---|---|---|
| Ground | H | A | A | H | H | A | H | H | A | H | A | A | H | A | A | H | H | A | H | H | A | A | H | A | H | A | H | A | H | A | H | A | A | H | H | A | H | A | H | A | H | A | H | H | A | A |
| Result | L | L | W | L | L | W | L | L | D | D | L | L | L | D | L | L | W | L | D | D | L | D | W | L | W | L | W | L | W | L | D | L | L | D | L | L | D | D | W | W | W | L | L | L | L | L |
| Position | 22 | 21 | 17 | 20 | 22 | 15 | 20 | 21 | 21 | 21 | 22 | 23 | 24 | 24 | 24 | 24 | 22 | 23 | 23 | 23 | 23 | 23 | 23 | 23 | 22 | 22 | 22 | 22 | 21 | 21 | 20 | 21 | 21 | 21 | 22 | 22 | 22 | 22 | 21 | 21 | 21 | 21 | 21 | 21 | 22 | 22 |

Source: 11v11.com
A = Away; H = Home; W = Win; D = Draw; L = Loss

==== League table ====
| Pos | Team | Pld | W | D | L | GF | GA | GAv | Pts | Promotion or relegation |
|---|---|---|---|---|---|---|---|---|---|---|
| 20 | Oldham Athletic | 46 | 13 | 10 | 23 | 61 | 83 | 0.735 | 36 | |
| 21 | Luton Town | 46 | 11 | 11 | 24 | 51 | 94 | 0.543 | 33 | Relegated |
| 22 | Port Vale | 46 | 9 | 14 | 23 | 41 | 76 | 0.539 | 32 | Relegated |
| 23 | Colchester United | 46 | 10 | 10 | 26 | 50 | 89 | 0.562 | 30 | Relegated |
| 24 | Barnsley | 46 | 9 | 11 | 26 | 54 | 90 | 0.600 | 29 | Relegated |

==== Matches ====
| 22 August 1964 1 | Colchester United | 0–1 | Carlisle United | Colchester |
| | | Report | Unknown goalscorer | Stadium: Layer Road; Attendance: 4,420 |

| 26 August 1964 2 | Luton Town | 3–1 | Colchester United | Luton |
| | Unknown goalscorer | Report | Stark | Stadium: Kenilworth Road; Attendance: 9,797 |

| 29 August 1964 3 | Port Vale | 1–2 | Colchester United | Burslem |
| | Poole 20' | Report | Stark 24'; Salisbury 26' | Stadium: Vale Park; Attendance: 8,190 |

| 31 August 1964 4 | Colchester United | 0–1 | Luton Town | Colchester |
| | | Report | Unknown goalscorer | Stadium: Layer Road; Attendance: 5,115 |

| 5 September 1964 5 | Colchester United | 1–2 | Hull City | Colchester |
| | Trevis 66' | Report | Wilkinson 13', 75' | Stadium: Layer Road; Attendance: 3,310 |

| 7 September 1964 6 | Mansfield Town | 0–1 | Colchester United | Mansfield |
| | | Report | McColl | Stadium: Field Mill; Attendance: 11,573 |

| 12 September 1964 7 | Colchester United | 0–3 | Brentford | Colchester |
| | | Report | Fielding; Lazarus | Stadium: Layer Road; Attendance: 3,977 |

| 14 September 1964 8 | Colchester United | 0–1 | Mansfield Town | Colchester |
| | | Report | Unknown goalscorer | Stadium: Layer Road; Attendance: 3,544 |

| 19 September 1964 9 | Bristol Rovers | 2–2 | Colchester United | Bristol |
| | Unknown goalscorer | Report | Stark; King | Stadium: Eastville Stadium; Attendance: 13,211 |

| 26 September 1964 10 | Colchester United | 2–2 | Oldham Athletic | Colchester |
| | Trevis; King | Report | Unknown goalscorer | Stadium: Layer Road; Attendance: 3,642 |

| 30 September 1964 11 | Grimsby Town | 2–0 | Colchester United | Cleethorpes |
| | Unknown goalscorer | Report | | Stadium: Blundell Park; Attendance: 8,455 |

| 3 October 1964 12 | Exeter City | 2–0 | Colchester United | Exeter |
| | Unknown goalscorer | Report | | Stadium: St James Park; Attendance: 5,800 |

| 5 October 1964 13 | Colchester United | 0–1 | Grimsby Town | Colchester |
| | | Report | Unknown goalscorer | Stadium: Layer Road; Attendance: 3,837 |

| 10 October 1964 14 | Bristol City | 1–1 | Colchester United | Bristol |
| | Unknown goalscorer | Report | Langley | Stadium: Ashton Gate Stadium; Attendance: 9,983 |

| 14 October 1964 15 | Bournemouth & Boscombe Athletic | 3–1 | Colchester United | Bournemouth |
| | Unknown goalscorer | Report | Stark | Stadium: Dean Court; Attendance: 7,526 |

| 17 October 1964 16 | Colchester United | 1–2 | Queens Park Rangers | Colchester |
| | Langley | Report | Unknown goalscorer | Stadium: Layer Road; Attendance: 3,529 |

| 19 October 1964 17 | Colchester United | 4–3 | Bournemouth & Boscombe Athletic | Colchester |
| | Langley 19', 83'; Stark 29'; Aitchison 82' | Report | Archer 14'; Woods 36'; Hodgson 47' | Stadium: Layer Road; Attendance: 3,454 |

| 24 October 1964 18 | Shrewsbury Town | 3–0 | Colchester United | Shrewsbury |
| | Unknown goalscorer | Report | | Stadium: Gay Meadow; Attendance: 4,770 |

| 26 October 1964 19 | Colchester United | 1–1 | Workington | Colchester |
| | Connolly 64' | Report | Unknown goalscorer | Stadium: Layer Road; Attendance: 3,700 |

| 31 October 1964 20 | Colchester United | 2–2 | Reading | Colchester |
| | Langley; Stark | Report | Unknown goalscorer | Stadium: Layer Road; Attendance: 3,350 |

| 7 November 1964 21 | Southend United | 6–3 | Colchester United | Southend-on-Sea |
| | Gilfillan; McKinven | Report; Report | Langley; Connolly | Stadium: Roots Hall; Attendance: 6,941 |

| 20 November 1964 22 | Scunthorpe United | 0–0 | Colchester United | Scunthorpe |
| | | Report | | Stadium: Old Showground; Attendance: 7,454 |

| 28 November 1964 23 | Colchester United | 2–1 | Walsall | Colchester |
| | Stark; Connolly | Report | Unknown goalscorer | Stadium: Layer Road; Attendance: 3,394 |

| 12 December 1964 24 | Carlisle United | 4–1 | Colchester United | Carlisle |
| | Unknown goalscorer | Report | Aitchison | Stadium: Brunton Park; Attendance: 5,747 |

| 19 December 1964 25 | Colchester United | 2–0 | Port Vale | Colchester |
| | Langley; Trevis | Report | | Stadium: Layer Road; Attendance: 2,528 |

| 26 December 1964 26 | Gillingham | 2–1 | Colchester United | Gillingham |
| | Unknown goalscorer | Report | Stark | Stadium: Priestfield Stadium; Attendance: 10,692 |

| 28 December 1964 27 | Colchester United | 2–1 | Gillingham | Colchester |
| | Trevis | Report | Unknown goalscorer | Stadium: Layer Road; Attendance: 3,966 |

| 2 January 1965 28 | Hull City | 5–1 | Colchester United | Kingston-upon-Hull |
| | Wagstaff; Chilton; Henderson; McSeveney | Report | Stark | Stadium: Boothferry Park; Attendance: 16,928 |

| 9 January 1965 29 | Colchester United | 4–1 | Barnsley | Colchester |
| | Langley; Stark; Docherty | Report | Unknown goalscorer | Stadium: Layer Road; Attendance: 2,824 |

| 16 January 1965 30 | Brentford | 1–0 | Colchester United | Brentford |
| | Gelson | Report | | Stadium: Griffin Park; Attendance: 9,000 |

| 23 January 1965 31 | Colchester United | 1–1 | Bristol Rovers | Colchester |
| | Stark | Report | Unknown goalscorer | Stadium: Layer Road; Attendance: 4,851 |

| 30 January 1965 32 | Watford | 3–0 | Colchester United | Watford |
| | Harris; Houghton; Own goal o.g.' | Report | | Stadium: Vicarage Road; Attendance: 5,720 |

| 6 February 1965 33 | Oldham Athletic | 3–1 | Colchester United | Oldham |
| | Unknown goalscorer | Report | Salisbury | Stadium: Boundary Park; Attendance: 6,926 |

| 13 February 1965 34 | Colchester United | 1–1 | Exeter City | Colchester |
| | Langley | Report | Unknown goalscorer | Stadium: Layer Road; Attendance: 3,073 |

| 20 February 1965 35 | Colchester United | 2–3 | Bristol City | Colchester |
| | Stark | Report | Unknown goalscorer | Stadium: Layer Road; Attendance: 2,905; Referee: R. Paine |

| 26 February 1965 36 | Queens Park Rangers | 5–0 | Colchester United | Shepherd's Bush |
| | Unknown goalscorer | Report | | Stadium: Loftus Road; Attendance: 4,462 |

| 6 March 1965 37 | Colchester United | 0–0 | Watford | Colchester |
| | | Report | | Stadium: Layer Road; Attendance: 3,385 |

| 13 March 1965 38 | Reading | 1–1 | Colchester United | Reading |
| | Unknown goalscorer | Report | Connolly | Stadium: Elm Park; Attendance: 5,502 |

| 20 March 1965 39 | Colchester United | 3–1 | Southend United | Colchester |
| | Own goal o.g.' Langley; Connolly | Report; Report | Bullock | Stadium: Layer Road; Attendance: 2,929 |

| 26 March 1965 40 | Barnsley | 1–2 | Colchester United | Barnsley |
| | O'Hara 55' | Report | Loughton 58'; Hall 86' | Stadium: Oakwell; Attendance: 3,070 |

| 3 April 1965 41 | Colchester United | 2–1 | Scunthorpe United | Colchester |
| | Trevis; Grice | Report | Unknown goalscorer | Stadium: Layer Road; Attendance: 3,212 |

| 10 April 1965 42 | Walsall | 2–1 | Colchester United | Walsall |
| | Unknown goalscorer | Report | Langley | Stadium: Fellows Park; Attendance: 2,766 |

| 16 April 1965 43 | Colchester United | 0–1 | Peterborough United | Colchester |
| | | Report; Report | Dougan | Stadium: Layer Road; Attendance: 6,074 |

| 17 April 1965 44 | Colchester United | 0–4 | Shrewsbury Town | Colchester |
| | | Report | Unknown goalscorer | Stadium: Layer Road; Attendance: 3,058 |

| 19 April 1965 45 | Peterborough United | 4–1 | Colchester United | Peterborough |
| | Barnes; Dougan; Thompson | Report; Report | Aitchison | Stadium: London Road Stadium; Attendance: 6,262 |

| 23 April 1965 46 | Workington | 1–0 | Colchester United | Workington |
| | Unknown goalscorer | Report | | Stadium: Borough Park; Attendance: 3,001 |

=== League Cup ===
| 2 September 1964 1st round | Colchester United | 1–1 | Torquay United | Colchester |
| | Aitchison | Report | Unknown goalscorer | Stadium: Layer Road; Attendance: 2,218 |

| 10 September 1964 1st round | Torquay United | 3–0 | Colchester United | Torquay |
| | Unknown goalscorer | Report | | Stadium: Plainmoor; Attendance: 4,683 |

=== FA Cup ===
| 14 November 1964 1st round | Colchester United | 3–3 | Bideford | Colchester |
| | Salisbury 4'; Langley 27'; Trevis 75' | Report | Court 2'; Bennett 37'; Penny 58' | Stadium: Layer Road; Attendance: 4,566 |

| 18 November 1964 1st round replay | Bideford | 1–2 | Colchester United | Bideford |
| | Bennett 31' | Report | Connolly 44'; Stark 76' | Stadium: The Sports Ground; Attendance: 4,513 |

| 5 December 1964 2nd round | Torquay United | 2–0 | Colchester United | Torquay |
| | Unknown goalscorer | Report | | Stadium: Plainmoor; Attendance: 4,724 |

== Squad statistics ==
=== Appearances and goals ===
| No. | Pos | Nat | Player | Total | | Third Division | | FA Cup | | League Cup | |
| No. | Pos | Nat | Player | Apps | Goals | Apps | Goals | Apps | Goals | Apps | Goals |
|---|---|---|---|---|---|---|---|---|---|---|---|
| | GK | (England) ENG | Alan Buck | 11 | 0 | 10 | 0 | 1 | 0 | 0 | 0 |
| | GK | (South Africa) RSA | Sandy Kennon | 10 | 0 | 10 | 0 | 0 | 0 | 0 | 0 |
| | DF | (Scotland) SCO | Duncan Forbes | 51 | 0 | 46 | 0 | 3 | 0 | 2 | 0 |
| | DF | (Scotland) SCO | John Fowler | 40 | 0 | 35 | 0 | 3 | 0 | 2 | 0 |
| | DF | (England) ENG | Richie Griffiths | 11 | 0 | 9 | 0 | 0 | 0 | 2 | 0 |
| | DF | (England) ENG | Brian Hall | 10 | 1 | 10 | 1 | 0 | 0 | 0 | 0 |
| | DF | (England) ENG | Mick Loughton | 28 | 1 | 25 | 1 | 3 | 0 | 0 | 0 |
| | DF | (England) ENG | Ray Price | 11 | 0 | 11 | 0 | 0 | 0 | 0 | 0 |
| | MF | (Scotland) SCO | John Docherty | 46 | 1 | 41 | 1 | 3 | 0 | 2 | 0 |
| | MF | (Wales) WAL | Tecwyn Jones | 25 | 0 | 25 | 0 | 0 | 0 | 0 | 0 |
| | MF | (England) ENG | John Mansfield | 1 | 0 | 1 | 0 | 0 | 0 | 0 | 0 |
| | MF | (England) ENG | Derek Trevis | 51 | 7 | 46 | 6 | 3 | 1 | 2 | 0 |
| | FW | (England) ENG | Barrie Aitchison | 41 | 4 | 36 | 3 | 3 | 0 | 2 | 1 |
| | FW | (England) ENG | Mike Grice | 45 | 1 | 40 | 1 | 3 | 0 | 2 | 0 |
| | FW | (Scotland) SCO | Bobby Hill | 15 | 0 | 14 | 0 | 0 | 0 | 1 | 0 |
| | FW | (England) ENG | Arthur Langley | 36 | 13 | 33 | 12 | 3 | 1 | 0 | 0 |
| | FW | (Wales) WAL | Gareth Salisbury | 17 | 3 | 15 | 2 | 1 | 1 | 1 | 0 |
| | FW | (Scotland) SCO | Billy Stark | 30 | 14 | 28 | 13 | 2 | 1 | 0 | 0 |
Players who appeared for Colchester who left during the season
| | GK | (England) ENG | Percy Ames | 30 | 0 | 26 | 0 | 2 | 0 | 2 | 0 |
| | DF | (England) ENG | Edgar Rumney | 11 | 0 | 11 | 0 | 0 | 0 | 0 | 0 |
| | FW | (England) ENG | Pat Connolly | 25 | 7 | 21 | 6 | 3 | 1 | 1 | 0 |
| | FW | (England) ENG | Noel Kearney | 3 | 0 | 3 | 0 | 0 | 0 | 0 | 0 |
| | FW | (England) ENG | Martyn King | 7 | 2 | 6 | 2 | 0 | 0 | 1 | 0 |
| | FW | (Australia) AUS | Tommy McColl | 6 | 1 | 4 | 1 | 0 | 0 | 2 | 0 |

=== Goalscorers ===
| Place | Nationality | Position | Name | Third Division | FA Cup | League Cup | Total |
|---|---|---|---|---|---|---|---|
| 1 | (Scotland) | FW | Billy Stark | 13 | 1 | 0 | 14 |
| 2 | (England) | IF | Arthur Langley | 12 | 1 | 0 | 13 |
| 3 | (England) | CF | Pat Connolly | 6 | 1 | 0 | 7 |
| 3 | (England) | MF | Derek Trevis | 6 | 1 | 0 | 7 |
| 5 | (England) | WG | Barrie Aitchison | 3 | 0 | 1 | 4 |
| 6 | (Wales) | IF | Gareth Salisbury | 2 | 1 | 0 | 3 |
| 7 | (England) | CF | Martyn King | 2 | 0 | 0 | 2 |
| 8 | (Scotland) | WH | John Docherty | 1 | 0 | 0 | 1 |
| 8 | (England) | WG | Mike Grice | 1 | 0 | 0 | 1 |
| 8 | (England) | LB | Brian Hall | 1 | 0 | 0 | 1 |
| 8 | (England) | CB | Mick Loughton | 1 | 0 | 0 | 1 |
| 8 | (Australia) | IF | Tommy McColl | 1 | 0 | 0 | 1 |
| | | | Own goals | 1 | 0 | 0 | 1 |
| | | | TOTALS | 50 | 5 | 1 | 56 |

=== Clean sheets ===
Number of games goalkeepers kept a clean sheet.

| Place | Nationality | Player | Third Division | FA Cup | League Cup | Total |
|---|---|---|---|---|---|---|
| 1 | (England) | Percy Ames | 3 | 0 | 0 | 3 |
| 2 | (South Africa) | Sandy Kennon | 1 | 0 | 0 | 1 |
| | | TOTALS | 4 | 0 | 0 | 4 |

=== Player debuts ===
Players making their first-team Colchester United debut in a fully competitive match.

| Position | Nationality | Player | Date | Opponent | Ground | Notes |
|---|---|---|---|---|---|---|
| WG | (England) | Barrie Aitchison | 22 August 1964 | Carlisle United | Layer Road | |
| CF | (England) | Pat Connolly | 22 August 1964 | Carlisle United | Layer Road | |
| IF | (Wales) | Gareth Salisbury | 22 August 1964 | Carlisle United | Layer Road | |
| MF | (England) | John Mansfield | 12 September 1964 | Brentford | Layer Road | |
| WG | (England) | Noel Kearney | 12 September 1964 | Brentford | Layer Road | |
| GK | (England) | Alan Buck | 3 October 1964 | Exeter City | St James Park | |
| WH | (Wales) | Tecwyn Jones | 10 October 1964 | Bristol City | Ashton Gate Stadium | |
| IF | (England) | Arthur Langley | 10 October 1964 | Bristol City | Ashton Gate Stadium | |
| CB | (England) | Mick Loughton | 7 November 1964 | Southend United | Roots Hall | |
| FB | (England) | Ray Price | 6 February 1965 | Oldham Athletic | Boundary Park | |
| GK | (South Africa) | Sandy Kennon | 6 March 1965 | Watford | Layer Road | |
| LB | (England) | Brian Hall | 6 March 1965 | Watford | Layer Road | |

== See also ==
- List of Colchester United F.C. seasons
