= Peter Butler =

Peter or Pete Butler may refer to:

- Pete Butler (coach) (1909–1983), American football, basketball, and baseball coach and college athletics administrator
- Peter Butler (politician) (born 1951), Conservative Member of Parliament
- Peter Butler (rugby union) (born 1951), played rugby for Gloucester and England in the 1970s
- Peter Butler (golfer) (1932–2022), English golfer
- Peter Butler (footballer, born 1942), English Football League player
- Peter Butler (footballer, born 1966), English Football League player
- Peter Butler (surgeon) (born 1962), set to perform the first face transplant in the UK
- Peter Butler (runner) (born 1958), Canadian middle-distance runner
- Peter A. Butler (born 1949), professor of physics at the University of Liverpool
- Peter Butler (trade unionist) (1901–1995), New Zealand seaman, trade unionist, communist and local politician
- Peter Butler of Roscrea, 16th-century Irish man
