= Arthur Thorpe =

Arthur Thorpe may refer to:

- Arthur Thorpe (footballer)
- Arthur Thorpe (physicist)
