= Listed buildings in Burbage, Derbyshire =

Burbage is a village in the High Peak district of Derbyshire, England. The village contains four listed buildings that are recorded in the National Heritage List for England. All the listed buildings are designated at Grade II, the lowest of the three grades, which is applied to "buildings of national importance and special interest". The listed buildings consist of a church, a former limehouse, a group of three obelisks, and a single obelisk.

== Buildings ==
Name and location	Photograph	Date	Notes
Limehouse; 53.25063°N 1.93916°W		Late 18th century	The former limehouse is in limestone. It consists of a simple rectangle, open to the front, partly open on the right side, and with an overhanging roof. To the right are traces of stone walling.
Three obelisks, Gardens of Edgemoor; 53.25851°N 1.94797°W		c. 1788	The three obelisks are placed around the gardens, they are in limestone, and about 4 metres (13 ft) high. Each obelisk has a tapering octagonal shaft with a moulded spreading base on an octagonal square-cut plinth with three recessed panels. The base is square with chamfered corners.
Obelisk, Dog Hole Cottage; 53.25145°N 1.93954°W		Mid-19th century	The obelisk is a monument to a dog in the garden of a cottage, and is in gritstone on a limestone base. The base is square on steps, the lower stage is decorated with a band of reeding, above is a panel with a carved motif, and a projecting moulded band and a squat obelisk. On each face is a triangular frieze, a Greek key frieze, paterae, and the incised word "BOB". At the top is a moulded cornice and the statue of a dog.
Christ Church; 53.25295°N 1.93578°W		1860–61	The church was designed by Henry Currey, and is in millstone grit with slate roofs. It consists of a nave, north and south aisles under parallel pitched roofs, north and south transepts, a chancel with a semicircular apse, an organ chamber and vestries, and a west tower. The tower has a porch, a semicircular stair turret, string courses, twin circular bell openings, a parapet rising to a triangle in the middle of each side, and a pyramidal roof. In the transepts are rose windows.
