= Bert Barlow =

English footballer (1916–2004)

Personal information
- Full name: Herbert Barlow
- Date of birth: 22 July 1916
- Place of birth: Kilnhurst, England
- Date of death: 19 March 2004 (aged 87)
- Place of death: Colchester, England
- Height: 5 ft 7 1/2 in (1.71 m)
- Position: Inside forward

Youth career
- Silverwood Colliery

Senior career*
Years	Team	Apps	(Gls)
1935–1937	Barnsley	58	(12)
1937–1938	Wolverhampton Wanderers	3	(1)
1938–1949	Portsmouth	104	(34)
1949–1952	Leicester City	42	(9)
1952–1954	Colchester United	60	(16)
- Crittall Athletic
- Long Melford
Total		267	(72)
- * Club domestic league appearances and goals

Herbert Barlow (22 July 1916 – 19 March 2004) was an English footballer who played as an inside forward in the Football League, where he made over 250 league appearances for Barnsley, Wolverhampton Wanderers, Portsmouth, Leicester City and Colchester United. His son Peter was also a professional footballer.

== Career ==
Born in Kilnhurst, Barlow began working as a miner in the then West Riding of Yorkshire at the Silverwood Colliery, where he played football, representing the miners' team. He joined Barnsley in July 1935, where he made 58 Football League appearances and scored 12 goals, and additionally scored two goals in four FA Cup matches. Barlow earned a £5,000 move to Wolverhampton Wanderers after being spotted by Frank Buckley. He would make only three appearances for the club, scoring once, before being signed by Portsmouth.

Barlow had the satisfaction of scoring against his former club Wolves in the 1939 FA Cup Final, opening the scoring in a 4–1 rout at Wembley. Following World War II, Barlow remained with Portsmouth and helped the club win the 1948–49 Football League Championship, before departing Fratton Park for Leicester City in December 1949. He left the club having netted 34 goals in 104 appearances. After scoring nine times in 42 games for Leicester, Barlow made a move to Colchester United for a £1,000 fee in the summer of 1952.

Making his debut on 13 September 1952 in a 1–0 defeat at Queens Park Rangers, Barlow would go on to make 60 appearances and score 16 goals in his two years at Layer Road before injury forced him to retire from the professional game, later representing Crittall Athletic and Long Melford. He remained active in local junior football, running a grocery shop in Colchester while coaching Colchester Casuals, Barn Hall and Long Melford and assisting his son Peter when he was manager at Coggeshall Town.

== Personal life ==
Barlow's son, Peter, was also a professional footballer, who began his career at Colchester United and later represented Workington and Hartlepool United in the Football League.

Herbert Barlow died in Colchester on 19 March 2004.

== Honours ==
Portsmouth

- Football League First Division: 1948–49
- FA Cup: 1938–39
- FA Charity Shield: 1949 (shared)

All honours referenced by:
