= Terry Price (footballer) =

English footballer

Personal information
- Full name: Terence Edmund Price
- Date of birth: 11 October 1945 (age 81)
- Place of birth: Colchester, England
- Height: 5 ft 7 in (1.70 m)
- Position: Winger

Youth career
- Leyton Orient

Senior career*
| Years | Team | Apps | (Gls) |
| 1964–1967 | Leyton Orient | 87 | (18) |
| 1967–1969 | Colchester United | 56 | (5) |
| 1969–1976 | Chelmsford City | | |
| 1976–1979 | Barnet | 65 | (8) |
- Gravesend & Northfleet
- Chelmsford City
- Tiptree United
| –1983 | Chelmsford City | | |
| Total | | 208 | (31) |
- * Club domestic league appearances and goals

Terence Edmund Price (born 11 October 1945) is an English former footballer who played in the Football League as a winger for Leyton Orient and Colchester United.

== Career ==
Born in Colchester, Price progressed through the youth ranks at Leyton Orient, representing England youth during a tour of Tenerife. He made his first-team debut just before his 19th birthday and scored against Portsmouth in the opening game of the 1964–65 season. While the club were suffering a financial crisis, Price briefly acted as trainer, but following Orient's relegation from the Second Division, Price would return to his hometown to play for Colchester United for a fee of £2,000. He had featured in 87 league games for the club, scoring 18 times.

Prior to joining Colchester, Price had a short trial with neighbours Ipswich Town, playing in a testimonial but featuring in no other competitive first-team action. He made his debut for the U's on 16 September 1967 in a 0–0 draw with Bury at Layer Road and scored his first goal for the club in a 2–1 home win against Swindon Town one month later.

Price suffered relegation during his first season with Colchester, and following manager Neil Franklin's departure coupled with the arrival of Dick Graham, Price found his first-team chances fewer and further between. After making 35 league starts for the club during the 1967–68 season, his involvement with the first-team in his second season was reduced, making 19 starts and coming on from the bench twice. In total, Price played 56 league games for the United, scoring five times, the last of these goals rounding-up the scoring in a 3–0 win against Workington on 4 November 1968. He played his final game for the club on 21 April 1969 in a goalless draw with Halifax Town at Layer Road.

Price would play for Chelmsford City after receiving the axe from Graham, later playing for the club on a further two separate occasions. He also had stints with a number of other non-league teams including Barnet and Gravesend before his first return to Chelmsford, and then a spell with Tiptree United before a further return to City where he would make 389 appearances for the club, scoring 108 goals. He played in the Eastern Counties league until 1985 and in local Sunday league football for a number of years after that. Price came back to Layer Road during 1993–94 in a coaching capacity for the youth team for a year.
