= Ernie Adams (footballer, born 1948) =

English footballer (born 1948)

Personal information
- Full name: Ernest Robert Adams
- Date of birth: 17 January 1948 (age 78)
- Place of birth: Hackney, London, England
- Height: 6 ft 0 in (1.83 m)
- Position: Goalkeeper

Youth career
- 1964–1965: Arsenal

Senior career*
Years	Team	Apps	(Gls)
1965–1967	Arsenal	0	(0)
1967–1969	Colchester United	48	(0)
1969–1972	Crewe Alexandra	112	(0)
1972–1973	Darlington	25	(0)
- Crook Town
Total		185	(0)
- * Club domestic league appearances and goals

Ernest Robert Adams (born 17 January 1948) is an English former footballer who played as a goalkeeper in the Football League for Colchester United, Crewe Alexandra and Darlington. Adams came up through the youth ranks at Arsenal, where was a member of the 1966 FA Youth Cup winning squad, but failed to break into the first-team.

== Career ==
Born in Hackney, London, Adams began his career at Arsenal as an apprentice in February 1964, and signed professional terms in January 1965. With the club, he finished as FA Youth Cup runner-up in 1965 and won the competition in 1966. Despite playing over 160 times for the Arsenal Academy and Reserves, Adams failed to break into the first-team squad, and was released at the end of the 1966–67 season.

Adams joined Colchester United for the 1967–68 season, making his professional debut on 19 August, the opening day of the season, in a 0–0 draw with Oldham Athletic at Layer Road. Adams missed only two league games during his first full season, but the club suffered relegation to the Fourth Division despite a strong FA Cup run. New manager Dick Graham began a clear-out of his inherited squad, with Adams one of the players to be forced out. He made his final appearance for Colchester on 4 September 1968 in a 1–0 League Cup defeat to Workington. He made 48 league appearances for the club.

Crewe Alexandra picked up Adams following his Colchester exit, and made 112 league appearances between 1969 and 1972, albeit in a very poor Crewe side that conceded 130 goals in two seasons. He subsequently joined Darlington for the 1972–73 season where he made 25 league appearances. Following this, Adams turned out for non-league Crook Town.

== Later life ==
On joining Crook Town, Adams settled in the local area, where he became a prison officer at HM Prison Frankland in Brasside, County Durham.

== Honours ==
Arsenal

- FA Youth Cup 1965: Runners-up medal
- FA Youth Cup: 1966: Winner
