= Pat Connolly (footballer) =

English footballer (born 1941)

Personal information
- Full name: Patrick Joseph Connolly
- Date of birth: 27 July 1941 (age 85)
- Place of birth: Newcastle-under-Lyme, England
- Position: Forward

Senior career*
Years	Team	Apps	(Gls)
1960–1963	Crewe Alexandra	9	(3)
1963–1964	Macclesfield Town	45	(27)
1964–1965	Colchester United	21	(7)
- Altrincham
- Northwich Victoria
- Winsford United
Total		30	(10)
- * Club domestic league appearances and goals

Patrick Joseph Connolly (born 27 July 1941) is an English former footballer who played in the Football League as a forward for Crewe Alexandra and Colchester United.

== Career ==
Connolly, born in Newcastle-under-Lyme, joined Crewe Alexandra in 1960, making nine appearances and scoring three goals in his time with the club. He moved into non-league football with Macclesfield Town before signing for Colchester United for £1,200 in 1964.

During the 1964–65 season, Connolly made 21 appearances, scoring seven goals. He made his debut on 22 August in a 1–0 defeat at Layer Road to Carlisle United and scored his first goal on 26 October in a 1–1 home draw with Workington. His last goal for the club came on 20 March 1965 in a 3–1 Essex derby win over Southend United, and made his last appearance on 16 April in a 1–0 defeat to Peterborough United.

Connolly later played for non-league teams Altrincham, Northwich Victoria and Winsford United after his Colchester exit in the summer of 1965.
