= Noel Kearney =

English footballer

Personal information
- Full name: Noel Michael Kearney
- Date of birth: 7 October 1942 (age 84)
- Place of birth: Ipswich, England
- Position: Winger

Youth career
- 1960–1964: Ipswich Town

Senior career*
Years	Team	Apps	(Gls)
1964	Colchester United	3	(0)
- Chelmsford City
Total		3	(0)
- * Club domestic league appearances and goals

Noel Michael Kearney (born 7 October 1942) is an English former footballer who played in the Football League as a winger for Colchester United.

== Career ==
Born in Ipswich, Kearney began his career with hometown club Ipswich Town, signing in October 1960. He spent four years with the club, making 50 youth appearances and 44 reserve appearances. He scored 79 goals at youth level and scored seven times in the reserve team, but failed to break into the first-team at the club.

He signed for Colchester United in September 1964 on trial from Ipswich at the age of 21, and went on to make his Football League debut on 12 September during a 3–0 defeat to Brentford at Layer Road. Kearney made three appearances for the U's, featuring for the final time on 5 October 1964 in another home defeat, on this occasion 1–0 to Grimsby Town.

After leaving Colchester, Kearney signed to Chelmsford City before retiring from the game. He became a builder following the end of his footballing career.
