= Tommy Watson (footballer, born 1943) =

Scottish footballer

Personal information
- Full name: Thomas Watson
- Date of birth: 23 August 1943 (age 83)
- Place of birth: Lesmahagow, Scotland
- Position: Winger

Youth career
- Stevenage Town

Senior career*
Years	Team	Apps	(Gls)
1965–1968	Peterborough United	75	(20)
1968–1970	Walsall	86	(17)
1970–1972	Gillingham	49	(7)
1972-74	Maidstone United		
1974-75	Gravesend and Northfleet	20	(9)
1975	Eastcourt United		
Total		230	(53)
- * Club domestic league appearances and goals

Thomas Watson (born 23 August 1943) is a Scottish former professional footballer. He played for Peterborough United, Walsall and Gillingham between 1965 and 1972. He then moved into the Southern League with Maidstone United and Gravesend and Northfleet before retiring through injury after a spell with Eastcourt United in the Kent County League.
