= Tommy McKechnie =

Scottish footballer

Tom McKechnie
Personal information
- Full name: Thomas Sharp McKechnie
- Date of birth: 9 February 1940
- Place of birth: Milngavie, Scotland
- Date of death: 6 April 2009 (aged 69)
- Place of death: Old Kilpatrick, Scotland
- Height: 6 ft 0 in (1.83 m)
- Position: Forward

Youth career
- Bridgeton Waverley

Senior career*
Years	Team	Apps	(Gls)
195?–1960	Rangers	0	(0)
1960–1961	Kirkintilloch Rob Roy		
1961–1966	Luton Town	131	(31)
1966–1967	Boscombe and Bournemouth Athletic	14	(2)
1967–1968	Colchester United	23	(5)
1968–19??	Bury Town		
- * Club domestic league appearances and goals

Thomas Sharp McKechnie (9 February 1940 – 6 April 2009) was a Scottish footballer who played as a forward, best known for his time with Luton Town. He also played in the Football League for Boscombe and Bournemouth Athletic and Colchester United.

== Playing career ==
Born in Milngavie, McKechnie started out with Bridgeton Waverley before joining Rangers, but never appeared in the Scottish League. He left for Kirkintilloch Rob Roy before moving south of the border to Luton Town in 1961. He spent five years in Bedfordshire before moving to Boscombe and Bournemouth Athletic, where he spent a year. He then spent a season at Colchester United before moving into non-League football with Bury Town.
