= Bob Walker (footballer, born 1942) =

English footballer (born 1942)

Personal information
- Full name: Robert Walker
- Date of birth: 23 July 1942
- Place of birth: Wallsend, England
- Position: Central defender

Senior career*
Years	Team	Apps	(Gls)
?–1962	Gateshead		
1962–1963	Brighton & Hove Albion	12	(1)
1963–1964	Ashford Town	40	(2)
1964–1965	Hartlepool United	0	(0)
1964–1965	Margate		
1965–1967	Bournemouth	10	(0)
1967–1968	Colchester United	17	(0)
1968–1969	Dover		
1969–1970	Bedford Town		
1970–1971	Salisbury		
- * Club domestic league appearances and goals

Robert Walker (born 23 July 1942) is an English former professional footballer who played as a central defender. He played in the Football League for Brighton & Hove Albion, Bournemouth and Colchester United.

Walker began his career at non-league Gateshead before joining Football League club Brighton & Hove Albion in 1962. After one season he played the next with Southern League Ashford Town (Kent). At the start of the 1964–65 campaign he joined Football League club Hartlepool United but after a brief stay in which he made no appearances he returned to the Southern League for four matches with Margate. Early in 1965 Walker returned to the Football League joining Bournemouth. He subsequently moved to Colchester United for the 1967–68 season.

Thereafter Walker played non-league football for Dover, Bedford Town and Salisbury.
