= Jackie Bell =

English footballer

Personal information
- Full name: John Russell Bell
- Date of birth: 17 October 1939
- Place of birth: Evenwood Co Durham
- Date of death: 1991 (aged 51–52)
- Position: Wing half

Senior career*
Years	Team	Apps	(Gls)
1957–1962	Newcastle United	111	(8)
1962–1964	Norwich City	48	(3)
1965–1966	Colchester United	7	(0)
- * Club domestic league appearances and goals

John Russell "Jackie" Bell (17 October 1939 – 1991) was an English footballer. He played for Newcastle United, Norwich City and Colchester United.

== Career ==
Bell joined Newcastle United straight from school. He turned professional in 1957. He played as a wing-back for the club from 1956 until 1962, making 117 appearances and scoring 8 goals.

After playing for Newcastle United since 1957, Bell was transferred to Norwich City in July 1962 for £100,000. This transfer became the subject of a dispute on which the League management committee heard evidence. Norwich City alleged that Newcastle United had asked too high a transfer for a player they knew to be diabetic. Newcastle denied they had tricked Norwich City and their explanation was accepted. They returned half the transfer fee to Norwich.

While playing for Colchester United, Bell was found to be suffering from diabetes so retired on medical advice from League football, joining Gainford Town.
