= Bill Atkins (footballer) =

English footballer

Personal information
- Full name: William Mark Atkins
- Date of birth: 9 May 1939 (age 87)
- Place of birth: Solihull, England
- Height: 6 ft 2 in (1.88 m)
- Position: Forward

Senior career*
| Years | Team | Apps | (Gls) |
| 1958–1959 | Aston Villa | 0 | (0) |
| 1959–1965 | Swindon Town | 75 | (28) |
| 1965–1967 | Halifax Town | 74 | (34) |
| 1967–1969 | Stockport County | 92 | (37) |
| 1969 | Portsmouth | 11 | (2) |
| 1969–1972 | Halifax Town | 125 | (37) |
| 1972–1973 | Rochdale | 25 | (7) |
| 1973–1975 | Darlington | 44 | (12) |
- * Club domestic league appearances and goals

William Mark Atkins (born 9 May 1939) is an English former professional footballer who played as a forward in the Football League in the 1960s and 1970s.

Atkins made league appearances for six different clubs, including two spells and 200 appearances with Halifax Town. His first spell with Halifax ended in March 1967 when he moved to Stockport County in a swap-deal with David Shawcross.
