= Alan Shires =

English footballer

Allan Shires
Personal information
- Full name: Allan Jeffrey Shires
- Date of birth: 29 June 1948 (age 78)
- Place of birth: Leigh-on-Sea, England
- Height: 5 ft 8 in (1.73 m)
- Position: Winger

Youth career
- Southend United

Senior career*
Years	Team	Apps	(Gls)
1965–1966	Southend United	1	(0)
1966–1968	Colchester United	23	(3)
- Chelmsford City
- Pegasus Athletic
- Southend Manor
Total		24	(3)
- * Club domestic league appearances and goals

Allan Jeffrey Shires (born 29 June 1948) is an English former footballer who played as a winger in the Football League for Southend United and Colchester United. He has a wife named Christine. They have three children; Darren, Dawn and Julie. Allan has two Sons-in-Law, Darren Yuille and Jeff Smith. He also has a Daughter-in-Law, Liezel. Allan Shires has six grandchildren; Angel Shires, Leon Shires, Billy Yuille, Louis Yuille, Katie Smith and Jennifer Smith.

== Career ==
Born in Leigh-on-Sea, Shires was an apprentice with local club Southend United, where he made one substitute appearance in the 1965–66 season.

Shires was released by Southend in the summer of 1966 and taken on trial and subsequently signed by Essex rivals Colchester United. He made his debut for the U's on 27 August 1966 in a 2–1 away defeat to Shrewsbury Town. His first goals came in a 3–2 away win over Reading on 8 October 1966, the second of which was a last-minute match winner. Shires went on to play 23 times for Colchester, scoring one further goal during a 5–3 home defeat to Torquay United on 4 November 1967. He played his last game for the club against Gillingham on 13 April 1968, a game in which he broke his collarbone.

Shires was released from Colchester in the summer of 1968, subsequently joining Chelmsford City. He also appeared for Southend Manor.
