= Gareth Salisbury =

Welsh footballer

Personal information
- Date of birth: 11 March 1941 (age 85)
- Place of birth: Caernarfon, Wales
- Position: Inside forward

Youth career
- Wrexham

Senior career*
Years	Team	Apps	(Gls)
1959–1962	Wrexham	11	(0)
1962–1963	Norwich City	0	(0)
1963–1964	Luton Town	12	(2)
1964–1965	Colchester United	15	(2)
1965–1966	Chesterfield	34	(9)
- Kidderminster Harriers
- Bangor City
1969–1971	Juventus	46	(5)
- * Club domestic league appearances and goals

Gareth Salisbury (born 11 March 1941) is a Welsh former professional footballer who played as a forward in The Football League.

== Club career ==
=== Football League career ===
His career in the Football league saw him play for Wrexham, Norwich City, Luton Town, Colchester United and Chesterfield.

=== Non-league career ===
He also went on to represent Kidderminster Harriers, where he scored five goals in ten appearances between 1967 and 1968 and Bangor City in the English non-leagues.

=== Australia ===
He later moved to Melbourne in Australia to play in the Victoria State League for Juventus and was voted Player of the Year in 1970 when the team won the grand slam, consisting of the Victorian State League and Australia Cup, the first national football competition.

In the 1969 season he made 8 league appearances. In the 1970 season he made 21 league appearances, scoring three goals. The following season he made 17 league appearances, scoring two goals.

== International career ==
He was also capped by Wales at youth international level.
