= Peter Butler (footballer, born 1942) =

English footballer

Personal information
- Date of birth: 3 October 1942 (age 84)
- Place of birth: Nottingham, England
- Position: Goalkeeper

Youth career
- Notts County

Senior career*
Years	Team	Apps	(Gls)
1961–1966	Notts County	44	(0)
1966–1967	Bradford City	17	(0)
- Worksop Town
Total		61	(0)
- * Club domestic league appearances and goals

Peter Butler (born 3 October 1942) is an English former professional footballer who played as a goalkeeper.

== Career ==
Born in Nottingham, Butler played for Notts County, Bradford City and Worksop Town.
