= David Buck (footballer) =

English footballer

Personal information
- Full name: David Colin Buck
- Date of birth: 25 August 1946
- Place of birth: Colchester, England
- Date of death: 1996 (aged 49–50)
- Position: Wing half

Youth career
- Colchester United

Senior career*
Years	Team	Apps	(Gls)
1965	Colchester United	1	(0)
Total		1	(0)
- * Club domestic league appearances and goals

David Colin Buck (25 August 1946 – 1996) was an English footballer who played as a wing half in the Football League for Colchester United.

== Career ==
Born in Colchester, Buck joined hometown club Colchester United as an apprentice. He made just one appearance for Colchester, coming on as a substitute for Reg Stratton in a 2–0 victory over Hartlepool United on 16 October 1965.

Buck had a twin brother, Alan, who also played for Colchester United as a goalkeeper, making 38 league appearances between 1964 and 1968.

David Buck died in 1996.
