= Barrie Aitchison =

English footballer (1937–2021)

Personal information
- Full name: Barrie George Aitchison
- Date of birth: 15 November 1937
- Place of birth: Colchester, England
- Date of death: 23 November 2021 (aged 84)
- Height: 5 ft 9 in (1.75 m)
- Position: Winger

Youth career
- 1953–1954: Colchester United

Senior career*
Years	Team	Apps	(Gls)
	Colchester Casuals	0	(0)
1954–1964	Tottenham Hotspur	0	(0)
1964–1966	Colchester United	50	(6)
1966–1967	Cambridge City		
- Bury Town
Total		50	(6)
- * Club domestic league appearances and goals

Barrie George Aitchison (15 November 1937 – 23 November 2021) was an English footballer who played as a winger in the Football League for Colchester United, where he came through the youth ranks before joining Tottenham Hotspur, but failed to make a first-team appearance. His older brother Peter also played professionally for Colchester United.

== Career ==
Born in Colchester, Aitchison followed in his brother Peter's footsteps by joining Colchester United from Border League football in 1953, but was considered too slight and was released in 1954, joining Tottenham Hotspur. He spent ten years with the club, mostly in the reserves and other minor sides, during which time they won the Football Combination twice. A fee of £750 brought Aitchison back to Layer Road in 1964 having failed to make a first-team breakthrough whilst at Tottenham.

Aitchison made his Colchester debut on 22 August 1964 in a 1–0 defeat at home to Carlisle United. He scored his first professional goal on 2 September of the same year in a 1–1 League Cup draw with Torquay United, going on to score six goals in the Football League in 50 games for the club. In September 1965, during a 2–0 home victory over Rochdale, Aitchison suffered an injury that would ultimately lead to his retirement from the full-time game, as he went on to play his final Football League and final professional game on 28 May 1966, a 2–1 away defeat to Newport County.

After declining Colchester's offer of a part-time contract for the 1966–67 season, Aitchison moved to non-league Cambridge City before transferring to Bury Town a season later.

== Later life ==
As a result of his footballing and injury suffered while with Colchester United, Aitchison underwent a cartilage operation in 1970. Following his retirement from the professional game, he worked for Alston's in Colchester, a furniture upholsterers.
