= Brian Westlake =

English footballer (1943–2026)

Personal information
- Date of birth: 19 September 1943
- Place of birth: Newcastle-under-Lyme, England
- Date of death: 7 February 2026 (aged 82)
- Position: Forward

Youth career
- 1961–1963: Stoke City

Senior career*
Years	Team	Apps	(Gls)
1963	Doncaster Rovers	5	(1)
1963–1966	Halifax Town	100	(27)
1966–1967	Tranmere Rovers	14	(3)
1967	Colchester United	15	(5)
1967–1968	Royal Daring de Bruxelles	25	(3)
1972–1973	Macclesfield Town	6	(2)
Total		165	(41)
- * Club domestic league appearances and goals

Brian Westlake (19 September 1943 – 7 February 2026) was an English footballer who played as a forward in the Football League for Colchester United, Doncaster Rovers, Halifax Town and Tranmere Rovers. He died on 7 February 2026, at the age of 82.

== Career statistics ==
Appearances and goals by club, season and competition
Club	Season	League			FA Cup		League Cup		Total	
Club	Season	Division	Apps	Goals	Apps	Goals	Apps	Goals	Apps	Goals
Stoke City	1961–62	Second Division	0	0	0	0	0	0	0	0
Doncaster Rovers	1963–64	Fourth Division	5	1	0	0	1	0	6	1
Halifax Town	1963–64	Fourth Division	20	11	0	0	0	0	20	11
Halifax Town	1964–65	Fourth Division	39	11	2	2	1	1	42	14
Halifax Town	1965–66	Fourth Division	36	4	0	0	1	0	37	4
Halifax Town	1966–67	Fourth Division	5	1	0	0	2	0	7	1
Halifax Town	Total		100	27	2	2	4	1	106	30
Tranmere Rovers	1966–67	Fourth Division	14	3	2	0	0	0	16	3
Colchester United	1966–67	Fourth Division	15	5	0	0	0	0	15	5
Career total			134	36	4	2	5	1	143	39
