= Tecwyn Jones =

Welsh footballer

Personal information
- Full name: Tecwyn Lloyd Jones
- Date of birth: 27 January 1941 (age 85)
- Place of birth: Ruabon, Wales
- Position: Wing half

Senior career*
Years	Team	Apps	(Gls)
1961–1964	Wrexham	57	(2)
1964–1965	Colchester United	28	(0)
1965–1966	Crewe Alexandra	8	(0)

International career
	Wales U23	1	(0)
- * Club domestic league appearances and goals

Tecwyn Lloyd Jones (born 27 January 1941) is a Welsh former professional footballer who played for football league clubs Wrexham, Colchester United and Crewe Alexandra before moving into Welsh non-league football. He represented Wales at U23 level.
