= Johnny Martin (footballer) =

English footballer

Personal information
- Full name: John Martin
- Date of birth: 4 December 1946
- Place of birth: Ashington, England
- Date of death: 16 November 2013 (aged 66)
- Place of death: Tenerife, Spain
- Position: Winger

Senior career*
Years	Team	Apps	(Gls)
1964–1966	Aston Villa	1	(0)
1966–1969	Colchester United	78	(11)
1969	Chelmsford City		
1969–1974	Workington	207	(32)
1974–1976	Southport	63	(7)
1976–19??	Wigan Athletic		
- Formby
- * Club domestic league appearances and goals

John Martin (4 December 1946 – 16 November 2013) was an English footballer who played as a winger in the Football League.

== Career ==
Born in Ashington, Martin made one appearance for Aston Villa before making appearances in the Football League for Colchester United, Workington, where he made over 200 league appearances, and Southport, and in non-league football for Chelmsford City, Wigan Athletic and Formby.

Martin lived in Tenerife from 1997. In 2006, he was diagnosed with leukaemia. He died in November 2013.
