= Arthur Thorpe (footballer) =

English footballer

Personal information
- Full name: Arthur William Thorpe
- Date of birth: 31 July 1939 (age 87)
- Place of birth: Lucknow, British India
- Position: Left winger

Youth career
- Bolton Wanderer

Senior career*
Years	Team	Apps	(Gls)
1957–1959	Ossett Albion		
1960–1963	Scunthorpe United	27	(5)
1963–1966	Bradford City	81	(17)
- Boston United
- Ossett Town
Total		108+	(22+)
- * Club domestic league appearances and goals

Arthur William Thorpe (born 31 July 1939) is an English former professional footballer who played as a left winger.

== Career ==
Born in Lucknow, British India, in 1939, Thorpe began his career in non-league football with Ossett Albion in 1957, before signing for Scunthorpe United in September 1960 as a 21-year-old. Thorpe spent three years at Scunthorpe, scoring 5 goals in 27 appearances in the Football League between 1960 and 1963. Thorpe also played Bradford City, scoring 17 goals in 81 League appearances between 1963 and 1966. Thorpe also played with Bolton Wanderer, Ossett Town and Boston United.
