= Peter Barlow (footballer) =

English footballer & manager (born 1950)

Personal information
- Full name: Peter Barlow
- Date of birth: 9 January 1950 (age 76)
- Place of birth: Portsmouth, England
- Height: 5 ft 10 in (1.78 m)
- Position: Forward

Youth career
- 1965–1966: Colchester United

Senior career*
Years	Team	Apps	(Gls)
1966–1969	Colchester United	21	(4)
1969–1970	Workington	42	(11)
1970–1971	Hartlepool United	11	(0)
1971-1972	Stafford Rangers		
1972-1973	Nantwich Town		(8)
- Hednesford Town
- Heybridge Swifts
- Chelmsford City
1978–1983	Coggeshall Town		
	Wivenhoe Town	80	
1991	Wivenhoe Town	2	(0)
Total		74	(23)

Managerial career
- 1978–1983: Coggeshall Town
- * Club domestic league appearances and goals

Peter Barlow (born 9 January 1950) is an English former football player and manager who played as a forward in the Football League for Colchester United, Workington and Hartlepool United. He was also player-manager at Coggeshall Town, assisted by his father Bert who was also a professional footballer.

== Career ==
Born in Portsmouth, Barlow began his playing career at Colchester United, where his father Bert had played in the early 1950s. On 27 December 1966, Barlow became Colchester's then youngest-ever player when he made his debut against Bournemouth at the age of 16 years and 342 days during a 2–0 win at Layer Road. Barlow remained the youngest debutant for the U's until Lindsay Smith made his debut for the club in April 1971 aged 16 years and 214 days. He is currently the third-youngest debutant behind Smith and Thomas Bender.

Barlow became a full professional at the club after his 18th birthday in January 1968, having been an apprentice since September 1965. He scored four goals in 16 appearances during the 1967–68 season, but under new manager Dick Graham, Barlow found himself on the transfer list and moved to Workington in February 1969. Having made 21 appearances for Colchester, Barlow added to his tally with 11 goals in 42 league games at Workington during his year-and-a-half with the Reds.

During the summer of 1970, Barlow moved to Hartlepool United, where he made just 11 league appearances before dropping into non-league football with Northern Premier League leaders Stafford Rangers. Here he emulated his father in playing at Wembley some 33 years later as Stafford beat Barnet 3–0 in the 1971–72 FA Trophy. Barlow played for Nantwich Town, returning to Stafford in the 1973 close season, and then appeared for Hednesford Town before returning to Essex with Heybridge Swifts and Chelmsford City. In 1978, he took over as player-manager at Coggeshall Town, assisted by his father. He remained at Coggeshall until 1983, when he returned to playing with Wivenhoe Town. He had a brief spell in junior football but returned to Broad Lane to play for Wivenhoe once again in August 1991 to help keep the cash-strapped club afloat.

== Honours ==
Stafford Rangers

- 1971–72 FA Trophy winner

All honours referenced by:
