= John Hornsby (footballer) =

English footballer

Personal information
- Full name: John Hornsby
- Date of birth: 3 August 1945 (age 81)
- Place of birth: Ferryhill, England
- Position: Winger

Senior career*
| Years | Team | Apps | (Gls) |
- Evenwood Town
| 1965–1966 | Colchester United | 11 | (1) |
- Ferryhill Athletic
- South Shields
| Total | | 11 | (1) |
- * Club domestic league appearances and goals

John Hornsby (born 3 August 1945) is an English former footballer who played in the Football League as a winger for Colchester United.

== Career ==
Born in Ferryhill, Hornsby represented local club Evenwood Town prior to joining Colchester United in 1965. He made his debut on 21 August 1965 in a 1–0 defeat to Port Vale at Vale Park. He scored just one goal for Colchester in his 11 league appearances in the home fixture against Port Vale which resulted in a 3–0 victory to the U's. He made his final appearance in a 0–0 draw with Aldershot at Layer Road on 16 April 1966 before returning to County Durham to play for hometown team Ferryhill United and South Shields.
