= Reg Stratton =

English footballer (1939–2018)

Personal information
- Full name: Reginald Malcolm Stratton
- Date of birth: 10 July 1939
- Place of birth: Kingsley, England
- Date of death: 21 May 2018 (aged 78)
- Height: 5 ft 10 in (1.78 m)
- Position: Forward

Senior career*
Years	Team	Apps	(Gls)
- Woking
1959–1965	Fulham	21	(1)
1965–1968	Colchester United	112	(51)
1968	Vancouver Royals	4	(0)
- Brentwood Town
- Basingstoke Town
- Dover
Total		137	(52)

International career
- England youth
1957	England amateur	3	(0)
- * Club domestic league appearances and goals

Reginald Malcolm Stratton (10 July 1939 – 21 May 2018) was an English footballer who played as a forward in the Football League for Fulham and Colchester United and in the North American Soccer League for Vancouver Royals.

== Career ==
Born in Kingsley, England youth and England amateur international Stratton joined Fulham in May 1959 after helping his club Woking to lift the FA Amateur Cup in front of a 71,000 strong crowd at Wembley Stadium by scoring in the 3–0 win. He had won England amateur caps against Germany, Ireland and Switzerland in 1957. With Woking, Stratton had scored 64 goals in 123 games for the club, but could only manage one goal in 21 games for Fulham between 1959 and 1965. His only league goal came against Liverpool.

Stratton rediscovered his scoring touch with Colchester United, where in 112 league games he scored 51 times. He made his United debut on 21 August 1965, a 1–0 away defeat at Port Vale and opened his scoring account with a brace on 1 September in the League Cup as the U's beat Exeter City 2–1 at Layer Road. In each of his three seasons with Colchester, Stratton finished as top scorer with 17, 24 and nine goals respectively, helping the club gain promotion to the Third Division at the end of the 1965–66 season. However, after refusing new terms, he was placed on the transfer list, and in 1968 briefly joined Vancouver Royals in the North American Soccer League where he made four appearances, before the team folded.

Following his spell in Canada, Stratton returned to England in the English non-leagues, playing for Brentwood Town, Basingstoke Town and Dover.

== Personal life ==
Stratton is great-uncle to former Manchester United and England midfielder Tom Cleverley.

Stratton was also a keen cricketer and in his later years he and his family had many connections to Cove Cricket Club in Hampshire.
