= Ken Hodgson =

English footballer (1942–2007)

Personal information
- Full name: Kenneth Hodgson
- Date of birth: 19 January 1942
- Place of birth: Newcastle upon Tyne, England
- Date of death: 23 October 2007 (aged 65)
- Position: Forward

Youth career
- Newcastle United

Senior career*
Years	Team	Apps	(Gls)
1960–1961	Newcastle United	6	(0)
1961–1964	Scunthorpe United	88	(30)
1964–1966	Bournemouth	78	(24)
1966–1969	Colchester United	57	(19)
1969–?	Poole Town	?	(?)
- * Club domestic league appearances and goals as of 17:22, 13 May 2011

Kenneth Hodgson (19 January 1942 – 23 October 2007), born in Newcastle upon Tyne, England, was an English professional footballer who played as a forward. He played for his hometown team Newcastle United, who developed him in their junior and reserve teams. He made six appearances before moving on to Scunthorpe, Bournemouth and Colchester United.

Hodgson was a versatile player, and he played in all five forward positions.
