= John Mansfield (footballer) =

English footballer

Personal information
- Full name: John Vincent Mansfield
- Date of birth: 13 September 1946 (age 80)
- Place of birth: Colchester, England
- Position: Midfielder

Youth career
- Colchester United

Senior career*
Years	Team	Apps	(Gls)
1964–1969	Colchester United	34	(3)
- Brentwood Town
- Chelmsford City
Total		34	(3)
- * Club domestic league appearances and goals

John Vincent Mansfield (born 13 September 1946) is an English former footballer who played in the Football League as a midfielder for Colchester United.

== Career ==
Born in Colchester, Mansfield signed for hometown club Colchester United as an apprentice, breaking into the first team in 1964 the day before his 18th birthday on 12 September in a 3–0 defeat to Brentford at Layer Road. He scored his first goal for the club on 10 May 1966 in a 1–0 victory at Southport.

Mansfield was involved in 34 Football League games between his debut in 1964 and his final game in 1968, a 1–0 home defeat to Workington in the League Cup on 4 September. He had scored three goals for the club with his final goal scored on 3 December 1966 in a 4–0 away win against Darlington.

After leaving Colchester following his final appearance, he went on to join non-league outfits Brentwood Town and Chelmsford City.
