= Ray Price (footballer) =

English footballer

Personal information
- Full name: Raymond Price
- Date of birth: 18 May 1944
- Place of birth: Hetton-le-Hole, England
- Date of death: 18 November 1990 (aged 46)
- Place of death: Grimsby, England
- Height: 5 ft 10 1/2 in (1.79 m)
- Position: Full-back

Youth career
- Norwich City

Senior career*
| Years | Team | Apps | (Gls) |
| 1963–1964 | Norwich City | 1 | (0) |
| 1964–1967 | Colchester United | 17 | (0) |
- Chelmsford City
| Total | | 18 | (0) |
- * Club domestic league appearances and goals

Raymond Price (18 May 1944 – 18 November 1990) was an English footballer who played in the Football League as a full-back for Norwich City and Colchester United.

== Career ==
Born in Hetton-le-Hole, Price began his career as a junior at Norwich City where he made one Football League appearance on 29 February 1964 in a 2–1 away defeat to Derby County, replacing regular left-back Joe Mullett who was suffering from tonsillitis.

Price moved to Colchester United in the summer of 1964. After making his debut on 6 February 1965 in a 3–1 defeat to Oldham Athletic at Boundary Park, he failed to establish himself in the first-team, with his most notable contribution being the first-ever substitute used by the U's when he came on for Ted Phillips in a 2–0 home win over Rochdale on 19 September 1965. He made 17 appearances for the club, with his final game a 0–0 draw with Gillingham on 11 March 1967.

Released in the summer of 1967, Price joined Chelmsford City before returning to Norwich to set up a successful badminton club. He then relocated to Lincolnshire where he was working as an insurance salesman when he suffered a fatal heart attack at the age of 46.
