= Alan Buck =

English footballer

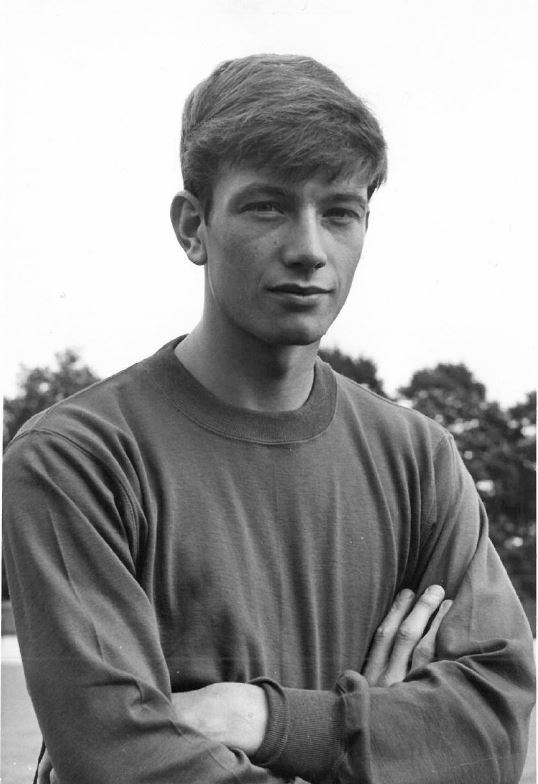

Personal information
- Full name: Alan Michael Buck
- Date of birth: 25 August 1946 (age 80)
- Place of birth: Colchester, England
- Position: Goalkeeper

Youth career
- Colchester United

Senior career*
Years	Team	Apps	(Gls)
1964–1968	Colchester United	38	(0)
- Poole Town
Total		38	(0)
- * Club domestic league appearances and goals

Alan Michael Buck (born 25 August 1946) is an English former footballer who played as a goalkeeper in the Football League for Colchester United.

== Career ==
Born in Colchester, Buck joined hometown club Colchester United as an apprentice. He made his debut for Colchester in a 2–0 home defeat to Exeter City on 3 October 1964. He went on to make 38 league appearances for the club between 1964 and 1968, with his final appearance coming in a 4–0 defeat to Scunthorpe United at Layer Road on 26 August 1968. After leaving Colchester, he joined non-league side Poole Town.

Buck had a twin brother, David, who also played for Colchester United as a wing half, making one league appearance in 1965. David died in 1996.
