= Burbage, Derbyshire =

Village in Derbyshire, England

Coordinates: 53.253°N 1.930°W

Burbage
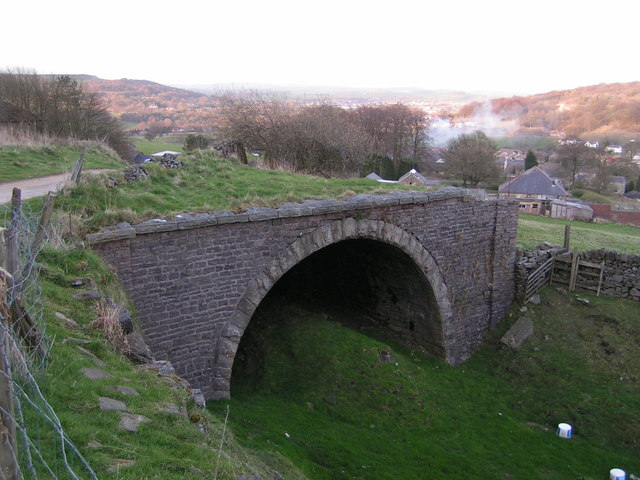
- Disused railway bridge, Burbage, which carried the old Macclesfield Road over the line. Viewed looking NE over Burbage and Buxton. The bridge is completely filled some 15 yards in. To the north lies the 500 yd Burbage Tunnel which took the line into the Goyt Valley.

- Location within Derbyshire
- Population: 2,540 (Ward. 2011)
- OS grid reference: SK047728
- District: High Peak
- Shire county: Derbyshire
- Region: East Midlands
- Country: England
- Sovereign state: United Kingdom
- Post town: BUXTON
- Postcode district: SK17
- Police: Derbyshire
- Fire: Derbyshire
- Ambulance: East Midlands

Burbage is a village in the High Peak district, in the county of Derbyshire, England. At the 2011 Census Burbage was a ward of the High Peak Borough Council. The population taken at this Census was 2,540.

Burbage is well known for its brass band, the Burbage Band (Buxton).

Burbage backs onto Grinlow Woods to the south and provides access to Solomon's Temple. Burbage Edge overlooks the settlement from the west.

Burbage Tunnel (now blocked) is a remnant of the Cromford and High Peak Railway, which operated from 1831 to 1967, although the section near Burbage was abandoned in the 1890s in favour of a new alignment via Buxton.

Christchurch at Burbage was designed by Henry Currey (architect for the Duke of Devonshire's estate) and was built in 1861. The Public Hall at Burbage was opened in July 1894 by Lady Cavendish and Lady Goring. It was built opposite Christchurch at the junction of Leek Road and Old Macclesfield Road. The hall held 400 people and was used for all the public events in Burbage for decades. The Burbage war memorial was erected beside it. Later it became Worth’s garage and car showroom. At the eastern end of the building were four shops, occupied amongst others by Thomas’s Grocers, Bonsall’s butchers and Edward’s newsagents. The building was demolished in 2007.

Burbage Golf Club (now defunct) first appeared in 1899. It continued until the 1920s.

The Duke pub (formerly the Duke of York Inn) on St John's Road is a free house. The Red Lion on Holmfield was built in 1842 but it is no longer a pub.

Photographs of Burbage can be found at GENUKI.

== Governance ==
Burbage was formerly a chapelry in the parish of Hartington, on 31 December 1894 Burbage became a separate civil parish, being formed from the part of Hartington Upper Quarter in Buxton Urban District, on 1 April 1974 the parish was abolished and became part of Buxton unparished area. In 1951 the parish had a population of 4780.

== See also ==
- Listed buildings in Burbage, Derbyshire
