= List of defunct English football stadiums =

This is a list of football stadiums in England that are now defunct. Each stadium is shown alongside the year in which it ceased to be used and the stadium which replaced it.

== Defunct stadiums ==
| Year | Club | Defunct Stadium | Replacement Stadium |
|---|---|---|---|
| 1881 | Nottingham Forest | Castle Ground | Trent Bridge Cricket Ground |
| 1886 | Sunderland | Abbs Field | Newcastle Road |
| 1886 | Millwall Rovers | Glengall Road | Lord Nelson Ground |
| 1889 | Wolves | Dudley Road | Molineux |
| 1890 | Millwall Athletic | Lord Nelson Ground | The Athletic Grounds |
| 1893 | Walsall Town Swifts | The Chuckery | West Bromwich Road |
| 1893 | Royal Arsenal | Invicta Ground | Manor Ground |
| 1894 | Notts County | Castle Ground | Trent Bridge Cricket Ground |
| 1895 | Bolton Wanderers | Pike's Lane | Burnden Park |
| 1896 | Rotherham Town | Clifton Grove | - |
| 1896 | Crewe Alexandra | Alexandra Recreation Ground | Gresty Road |
| 1896 | Southampton | Antelope Ground | County Ground |
| 1897 | Thames Ironworks | Browning Road | Memorial Grounds |
| 1897 | Aston Villa | Wellington Road | Villa Park |
| 1897 | Luton Town | Dallow Lane | Dunstable Road |
| 1898 | Blackpool | Athletic Grounds | Bloomfield Road |
| 1898 | Southampton | County Ground | The Dell |
| 1898 | Sunderland | Newcastle Road | Roker Park |
| 1899 | Darwen | Barley Bank | Anchor Ground |
| 1899 | Grimsby Town | Abbey Park | Blundell Park |
| 1899 | Sheffield Wednesday | Olive Grove | Hillsborough Stadium (originally Owlerton Stadium) |
| 1900 | Loughborough | Athletic Ground | - |
| 1900 | West Bromwich Albion | Stoney Lane | The Hawthorns |
| 1901 | Leicester City | Belgrave Road Cycle and Cricket Ground | Aylestone Road |
| 1901 | Millwall Athletic | Athletic Ground | North Greenwich |
| 1902 | Gainsborough Trinity | Bowling Green Ground | The Northolme |
| 1905 | Luton Town | Dunstable Road | Kenilworth Road |
| 1906 | Hull City | The Circle | Anlaby Road |
| 1908 | Norwich City | Newmarket Road | The Nest |
| 1910 | Millwall | North Greenwich | The Old Den |
| 1910 | Manchester United | Bank Street | Old Trafford |
| 1913 | Woolwich Arsenal | Manor Ground | Highbury |
| 1913 | Port Vale | Athletic Ground | Old Recreation Ground |
| 1915 | Crystal Palace | Crystal Palace | The Nest |
| 1923 | Manchester City | Hyde Road | Maine Road |
| 1924 | Crystal Palace | The Nest | Selhurst Park |
| 1926 | Castleford Town | Castleford Sports Stadium | Wheldon Road |
| 1930 | Clapton Orient | Millfields Road | Lea Bridge Stadium |
| 1930 | Gateshead | Horsley Hill | Redheugh Park |
| 1932 | York City | Fulfordgate | Bootham Crescent |
| 1935 | Norwich City | The Nest | Carrow Road |
| 1939 | Hull City | Anlaby Road | Boothferry Park |
| 1950 | Port Vale | Old Recreation Ground | Vale Park |
| 1955 | Southend United | Southend Stadium | Roots Hall |
| 1963 | Accrington Stanley | Peel Park | Crown Ground |
| 1968 | Nelson | Seedhill | Victoria Park |
| 1969 | New Brighton | Tower Athletic Grounds | — |
| 1970 | Gateshead | Redheugh Park | Gateshead International Stadium |
| 1973 | Bradford Park Avenue | Park Avenue | Horsfall Stadium |
| 1976 | Bury Town | Cemetry Road | Ram Meadow |
| 1980 | Tonbridge Angels | Angel Ground | Longmead Stadium |
| 1982 | Hillingdon Borough | Falling Lane | |
| 1985 | — | White City Stadium | — |
| 1986 | Bristol Rovers | Eastville Stadium | Twerton Park |
| 1987 | Ashford United | Essella Park | The Homelands |
| 1988 | Maidstone United F.C. (1897) | Athletic Ground | - |
| 1988 | Scunthorpe United | Old Showground | Glanford Park |
| 1989 | Witton Albion | Central Ground | Wincham Park |
| 1990 | Grantham Town | London Road | South Kesteven Sports Stadium |
| 1990 | Walsall | Fellows Park | Bescot Stadium |
| 1990 | Wycombe Wanderers | Loakes Park | Adams Park |
| 1990 | Yeovil Town | Huish Athletic Ground | Huish Park |
| 1992 | Maidstone United | Watling Street | Gallagher Stadium |
| 1992 | Chester City | Sealand Road | Deva Stadium |
| 1993 | Millwall | The Old Den | The Den |
| 1994 | Huddersfield Town | Leeds Road | Galpharm Stadium (originally McAlpine Stadium) |
| 1994 | Northampton Town | County Ground | Sixfields Stadium |
| 1994 | — | Fallowfield Stadium | — |
| 1995 | Middlesbrough | Ayresome Park | Riverside Stadium |
| 1997 | Bolton Wanderers | Burnden Park | Reebok Stadium |
| 1997 | Brighton and Hove Albion | Goldstone Ground | Withdean Stadium |
| 1997 | Derby County | Baseball Ground | Pride Park Stadium |
| 1997 | Stoke City | Victoria Ground | Britannia Stadium |
| 1997 | Sunderland | Roker Park | Stadium of Light |
| 1998 | Reading | Elm Park | Madejski Stadium |
| 1998 | Wimbledon | Plough Lane | Kingsmeadow |
| 1999 | Enfield | Southbury Road | Meadow Park |
| 1999 | Wigan Athletic | Springfield Park | DW Stadium |
| 2000 | — | Wembley Stadium (1923) | Wembley Stadium |
| 2001 | Runcorn | Canal Street | Halton Stadium |
| 2001 | Oxford United | Manor Ground | Kassam Stadium |
| 2001 | Southampton | The Dell | St Mary's Stadium |
| 2002 | Hull City | Boothferry Park | KCOM Stadium |
| 2002 | Leicester City | Filbert Street | King Power Stadium |
| 2003 | Darlington | Feethams | The Darlington Arena (originally Reynolds Arena) |
| 2003 | Manchester City | Maine Road | City of Manchester Stadium |
| 2005 | Burton Albion | Eton Park | Pirelli Stadium |
| 2005 | Coventry City | Highfield Road | Ricoh Arena |
| 2005 | Swansea City | Vetch Field | The Liberty Stadium |
| 2006 | Arsenal | Highbury | Emirates Stadium |
| 2006 | Aylesbury United | Buckingham Road | The Meadow |
| 2007 | Doncaster Rovers | Belle Vue | Keepmoat Stadium |
| 2007 | Shrewsbury Town | Gay Meadow | New Meadow |
| 2007 | Milton Keynes Dons | former England National Hockey Stadium | Stadium:mk |
| 2007 | Scarborough | McCain Stadium | Flamingo Land Stadium (as Scarborough Athletic) |
| 2008 | Colchester United | Layer Road | Colchester Community Stadium |
| 2008 | Hendon | Claremont Road | Chesnut Avenue (2008-2009); Wheatsheaf Park (2008-2009); Vale Farm (2009-2013); Earlsmead Stadium (2013-2016); Silver Jublee Park (2016–present) |
| 2008 | Horsham | Queen Street | Woodside Road (2008-2009); Goring's Mead (2009-2017); Culver Road (2017-2019); Hop Oast (2019–present) |
| 2008 | Rotherham United | Millmoor | Don Valley Stadium |
| 2009 | Cardiff City | Ninian Park | Cardiff City Stadium |
| 2010 | Chesterfield | Saltergate | Technique Stadium |
| 2010 | Grays Athletic | New Recreation Ground | Rookery Hill (2010-2012); Rush Green (2012-2013); Mill Field (2013-2017) |
| 2010 | Morecambe | Christie Park | Globe Arena |
| 2011 | Hayes & Yeading | Church Road | Kingfield Stadium |
| 2011 | Kettering Town | Rockingham Road | Latimer Park |
| 2012 | Rotherham United | Don Valley Stadium | New York Stadium |
| 2012 | Rushden and Diamonds | Nene Park | Hayden Road (as AFC Rushden & Diamonds) |
| 2013 | Barnet | Underhill Stadium | The Hive Stadium |
| 2013 | Cambridge City | Milton Road Ground | Bridge Road Ground (Ground share) |
| 2016 | West Ham United | Boleyn Ground | London Stadium |
| 2017 | Aveley | Mill Field | Parkside |
| 2017 | Grays Athletic | Mill Field | Parkside |
| 2017 | Tottenham Hotspur | White Hart Lane | Wembley Stadium (2017-2018); Tottenham Hotspur Stadium (2019–present) |
| 2020 | Boston United | York Street | Jakemans Community Stadium |
| 2020 | Brentford | Griffin Park | Brentford Community Stadium |
| 2020 | AFC Wimbledon | Kingsmeadow Stadium | Plough Lane |
| 2021 | York City | Bootham Crescent | LNER Community Stadium |
| 2024 | Truro City | Treyew Road | Truro City Stadium |
| 2025 | Everton | Goodison Park | Hill Dickinson Stadium |

== Stadiums no longer used for football ==
- Aigburth Cricket Ground
- Alexandra Meadows - Last used for football in 1881 by Blackburn Rovers. Remains in use for its original purpose of cricket.
- Christ Church Ground
- Clifton Grove
- County Cricket Ground, Derby
- County Cricket Ground, Northampton
- The Darlington Arena
- Dean Park Cricket Ground
- Herne Hill Velodrome - FA Amateur Cup Final 1911 played there. Used by Crystal Palace F.C. between 1914–1918. Used now for cycling races although a football pitch is still available.
- Kennington Oval
- Nevill Ground — Last used for football in 1903. Remains in use for its original purpose of cricket.
- Trent Bridge — Last used for football in 1910 by Notts County. Remains in use for its original purpose of cricket.

== See also ==
- List of football stadiums in England
