= The Den =

Football stadium in London, home to Millwall F.C. since 1993

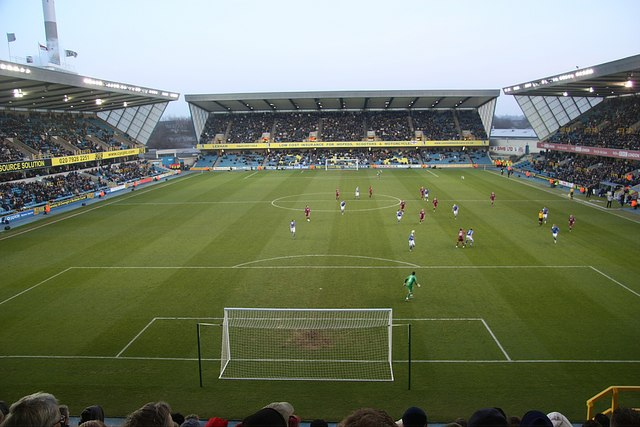
- View from the North Stand in 2009
- Interactive map of The Den
- Former names: The New Den; Senegal Fields; The New London Stadium
- Location: New Cross Gate; London, SE16
- Coordinates: 51°29′9″N 0°3′3″W
- Capacity: 20,146
- Surface: SISGrass (hybrid grass)
- Scoreboard: 55sqm LED Display
- Field size: 106 × 64 m
- Public transit: South Bermondsey

Construction
- Built: 1992–93
- Opened: 4 August 1993; 33 years ago
- Cost: £16 million

Tenants
- Millwall F.C. (1993–present); Millwall Lionesses L.F.C. (2015–2019)

The Den (previously The New Den) is a football stadium in the New Cross and Bermondsey area of south-east London, and the home of Millwall Football Club. The Den is adjacent to the South London railway originating at London Bridge, and a quarter-of-a-mile from the Old Den, which it replaced on September 30, 1993.

Built on a previous site of housing, a church and the Senegal Fields playgrounds, the Den has an all-seated capacity of 20,146, although segregation of visiting supporters and crowd safety measures have historically reduced the usable capacity, to approximately 18,100 in 2013.

The Den is the sixth stadium that Millwall have occupied since their formation in the Millwall area of the Isle of Dogs in 1885. Previous grounds include Glengall Road (1885–1886), Lord Nelson Ground (1886–1890), The Athletic Grounds (1890–1901), North Greenwich (1901–1910) and The Old Den (1910–1993).

== History ==
The New Den, as it was initially known to distinguish it from its predecessor, was the first new all-seater stadium in England to be completed after the Taylor Report on the Hillsborough disaster of 1989. It was designed with effective crowd management in mind (particularly given Millwall's crowd problems at The Old Den), with the escape routes being short and direct. After chairman Reg Burr decided that it would not be viable to redevelop The Old Den as an all-seater stadium, he announced in 1990 that the club would relocate to a new stadium in the Senegal Fields area in south Bermondsey. Originally, it was planned to have a seating capacity of between 25,000 and 30,000; however, the club opted to wait so the capacity was kept to just over 20,000.

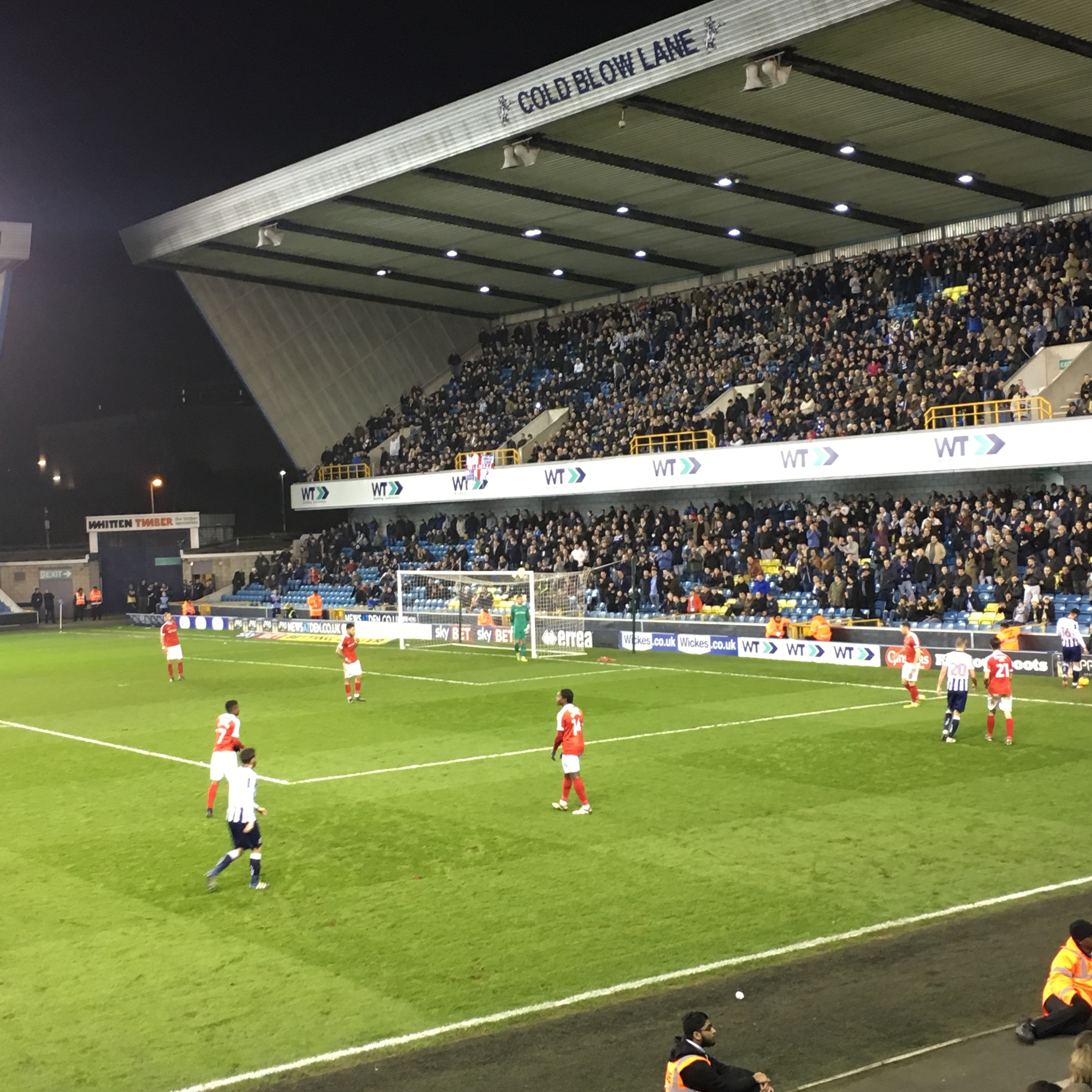
South London rivals Millwall and Charlton playing in front of the Cold Blow Lane Stand at the Den in December 2016

Millwall played their final game at The Old Den on 8 May 1993 after 83 years and then moved to the new stadium a quarter-of-a-mile away from Cold Blow Lane. The £16 million New Den was opened by John Smith, the leader of the Labour Party and of the Opposition at the time, on 4 August 1993 prior to a prestigious friendly against Sporting CP, which Sporting won 2–1. The Den was the first new stadium constructed for a professional football team in London since 1937.

Millwall have experienced mixed fortunes since relocating to the Den. Their first season at the stadium (1993–94) saw them finish third in Division One—their highest finish since relegation from the top flight four years earlier. However, their dreams of Premier League football were ended by a defeat in the playoffs and they were relegated to Division Two in 1996, not winning promotion from that level until 2001. They again came close to reaching the Premier League in 2002, finishing fourth, but once again losing in the playoffs. The Lions reached the FA Cup final for the first time in 2004, and despite a 3–0 defeat by Manchester United they qualified for European competition for the first time in their history. Millwall has been relegated twice since then; going down in 2006 and 2015, but have also won promotion in 2010 and 2017. However, the stadium has yet to host Premier League football—Millwall had played in the old First Division for two seasons from 1988 during their final few years at their previous stadium.

In September 2016 Lewisham Council approved a compulsory purchase order of land surrounding the Den rented by Millwall, as part of a major redevelopment of the "New Bermondsey" area. The plans are controversial because the developer, Renewal, is controlled by offshore companies with unclear ownership, and is seen by the club and local community to be profiteering by demolishing existing homes and businesses as well as Millwall's car-park and the highly acclaimed and well recognised Millwall Community Trust—to build up to 2,400 new private homes, with no council housing and less than 15% of 'affordable housing'. Millwall had submitted their own plans for regeneration centred around the football club itself, but the council voted in favour of Renewal's plans. Original plans submitted in 2012 would have seen the stadium demolished for redevelopment.

In December 2016 Private Eye reported how Renewal had been founded by a former Lewisham Council leader and senior officer, suggesting potential bias, and that the decision to approve Renewal's plans may have been made as long ago as 2013 despite the fact that no due diligence had been able to be carried out by PricewaterhouseCoopers due to "poor" and "limited" access to information and management at Renewal, which is registered in the Isle of Man.

In October 2019 Lewisham Council terminated the conditional land sale agreement with Renewal, ensuring the stadium's future. This allowed Millwall to prepare their own development plans, and in February 2020, Millwall announced plans for a phased expansion, adding upper tiers behind existing seating to gradually expand the Den to 34,000 seats.

In June 2021, Renewal submitted new plans for its housing development by the Den, with 3,500 new homes in towers of up to 44 storeys over a 15-year period. The first phase, behind Surrey Canal Road, would see 600 new flats in three 31-storey blocks, with 35% meeting an "affordable" requirement. Surrey Canal railway station is planned to service the area.

== Stands ==
On 20 January 2011, the East Stand of The Den was renamed as the Dockers Stand, paying tribute to Millwall's early history and supporter base of Thames dockers, and houses Millwall's family enclosure and executive boxes. The South Stand is known as the Cold Blow Lane Stand, which was the name of the road which led into The Old Den. The West Stand was renamed the Barry Kitchener Stand, named after Millwall's longest-serving player. It houses Millwall's family hospitality lounges, press box and executive seats.

In August 2026, the North Stand was converted to accommodate both home and visiting supporters. The stand was split down the middle, with licensed safe standing installed across the entire upper tier.

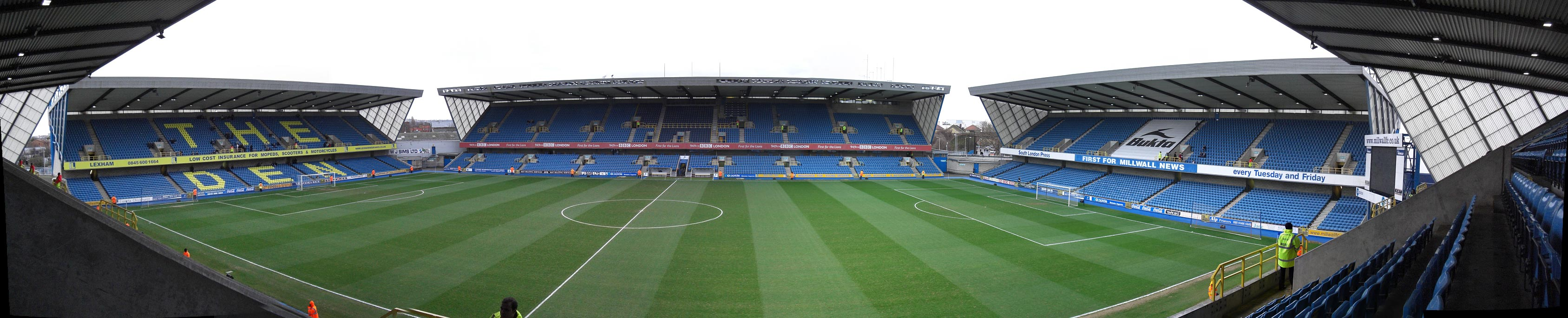
A panoramic view of The Den from the Dockers Stand. Directly opposite is the Barry Kitchener Stand, to the left is the Cold Blow Lane Stand and to the right is the North Stand.
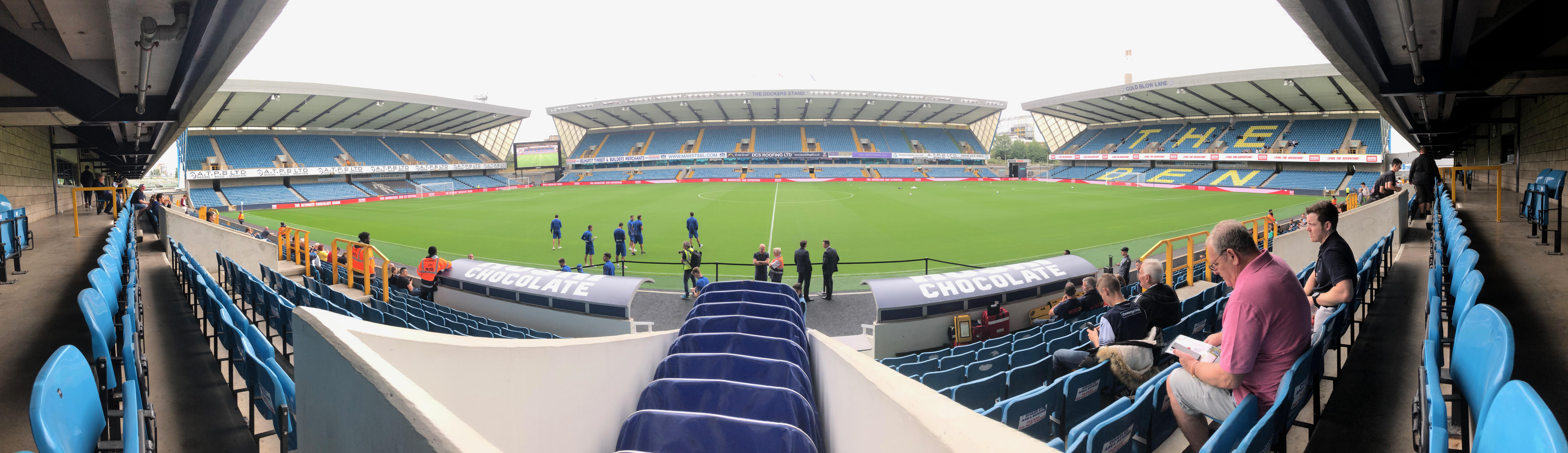
A panoramic view of the Den from Block 31 in the Barry Kitchener Stand. The image shows the new scoreboard and Huski Chocolate sponsorship.

== Average attendances ==
EFL Championship
- 2025–26: 17,135
- 2024–25: 15,490
- 2023–24: 16,540
- 2022–23: 14,767
- 2021–22: 12,970
- 2020–21: 174
- 2019–20: 10,748
- 2018–19: 13,624
- 2017–18: 13,368

League One
- 2016–17: 9,340
- 2015–16: 9,108

The Championship
- 2014–15: 10,902
- 2013–14: 11,330
- 2012–13: 10,559
- 2011–12: 11,484
- 2010–11: 12,438

League One
- 2009–10: 10,835
- 2008–09: 8,940
- 2007–08: 8,669
- 2006–07: 9,452

The Championship
- 2005–06: 9,529
- 2004–05: 11,656

Division One
- 2003–04: 10,500
- 2002–03: 8,512
- 2001–02: 13,380

Division Two
- 2000–01: 11,442
- 1999–00: 9,463
- 1998–99: 6,958
- 1997–98: 7,022
- 1996–97: 7,753

Division One
- 1995–96: 9,559
- 1994–95: 7,687
- 1993–94: 10,100

== International matches and other events ==
In 1994, a boxing match was held at the Den. Local boy Michael Bentt lost his WBO World Heavyweight Championship to Herbie Hide. The fight was Bentt's last after being rushed to the hospital and told he could never fight again, after suffering brain injuries in the loss. On 1 May 2006, the Den hosted the FA Women's Cup Final between Arsenal L.F.C. and Leeds United L.F.C. Arsenal Ladies won the Cup 5–0. Four international matches have been hosted at the Den. England Women 0-1 Germany Women (8 March 1998), Ghana 1–1 Senegal (21 August 2007), Jamaica 0–0 Nigeria (11 February 2009) and Australia 3–4 Ecuador (5 March 2014). Former Millwall player Tim Cahill scored two of Australia's goals, becoming the country's all-time top scorer. On 5 September 2015, the ground hosted Rugby league as Wigan Warriors defeated the Catalans Dragons 42–16 in a Super League Super 8s match in front of a crowd of 8,101.

=== Celebrity Soccer Sixes ===
The Den hosted the Samaritans Celebrity Soccer Sixes on 18 May 2008. Film and television stars played at the Den, the first time the event has not been hosted by a Premier League club. Babyshambles failed to retain the trophy, losing 3–2 to dance act Faithless. The winners of the women's trophy were Cansei de Ser Sexy. Around 150 celebrities took part including McFly, Tony Hadley, Amy Winehouse and ex-Millwall fan favourite Terry Hurlock to raise money for the charity.

=== In drama ===
The Den doubles as The Dragon's Lair, home ground of Harchester United in the TV series Dream Team. It also appeared in an episode of the ITV show Primeval. The Base is often used by the TV and film industries. It was used to film The Bill episode of Gun Runner: Kick Off featuring their home game against Leyton Orient in March 2008 (aired on ITV in July 2008). Sportswear giant Nike filmed their Take It to the Next Level advertisement over a period of three days and nights at the Den, also in March 2008. In 2010, Kit Kat made their own 'Cross your Fingers' advert using clips from Arsenal, West Ham, Oxford United and also Millwall's Den.

== Transport and access ==
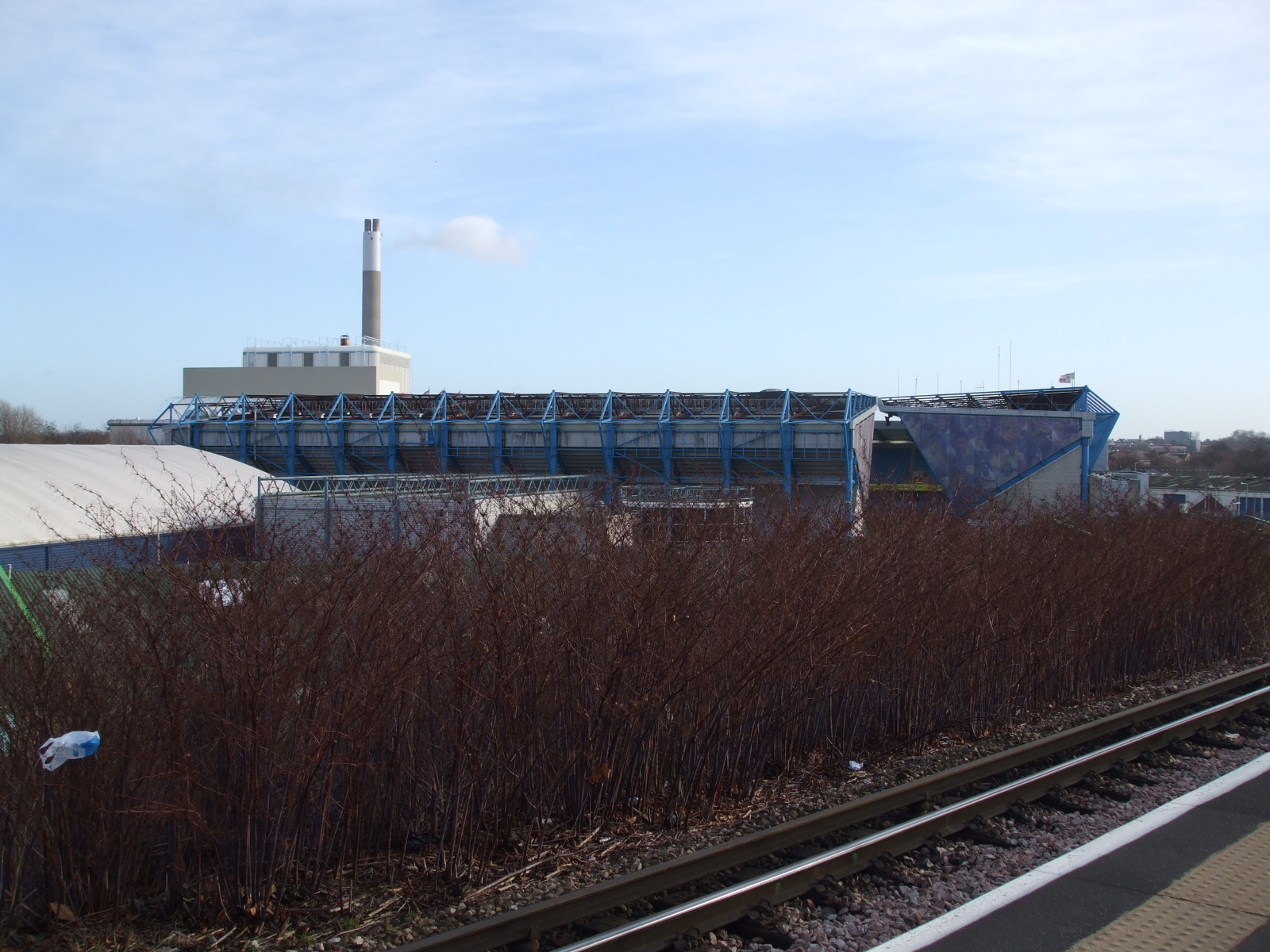
View of the Den from South Bermondsey railway station

The Den is served by the National Rail station South Bermondsey, which is a five-minute walk away from the ground. Away supporters have their own walkway link, which is available to them on match days. There are no official car parking facilities for supporters. The P12 bus stops closest to the ground in Ilderton Road, just a two-minute walk away. The 21, 53, 172 and 453 buses all stop on the Old Kent Road, a ten-minute walk away from the ground. The closest tube station to the Den is Canada Water (on the Jubilee line), which is a 20-minute walk away. The former East London Line stations of Surrey Quays and New Cross Gate (now part of London Overground) both are a 15-minute walk from the stadium.

Construction of New Bermondsey railway station, a London Overground line adjacent to the Den, began in 2012 but then stalled as plans for a major development were delayed. The June 2021 Renewal plans for its housing development included completion of New Bermondsey station.

The Quietway 1 cycle route runs around South Bermondsey station and past the Den. However, the route is closed and diverted in the vicinity of the stadium on Millwall match days.

== See also ==
- Football in London
- Lists of stadiums
