= Joseph Cross =

Joseph or Joe Cross may refer to:

== People ==
- Joseph Cross (actor) (born 1986), American actor
- Joseph Cross (cartographer) (1821–1865), English cartographer
- Joseph Cross (cricketer) (1849–1918), English cricketer
- Joseph Cross (judge) (1843–1913), New Jersey state legislator and judge
- Joseph Cross (trade unionist) (1859–1925), British trade unionist
- Joe Cross (baseball) (1858–1933), Major League Baseball right fielder
- Joe Cross (filmmaker) (born 1966), Australian filmmaker

== Other ==
- Joseph Cross (tower) (German: Josephskreuz), an architecturally significant observation tower
