= Old Kent Road railway station =

Former railway station in England

Coordinates: 51.4782°N 0.0545°W

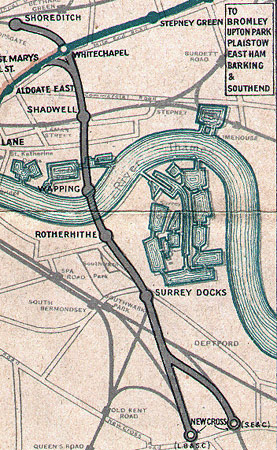
A 1915 map showing the location of the station near the bottom of the map

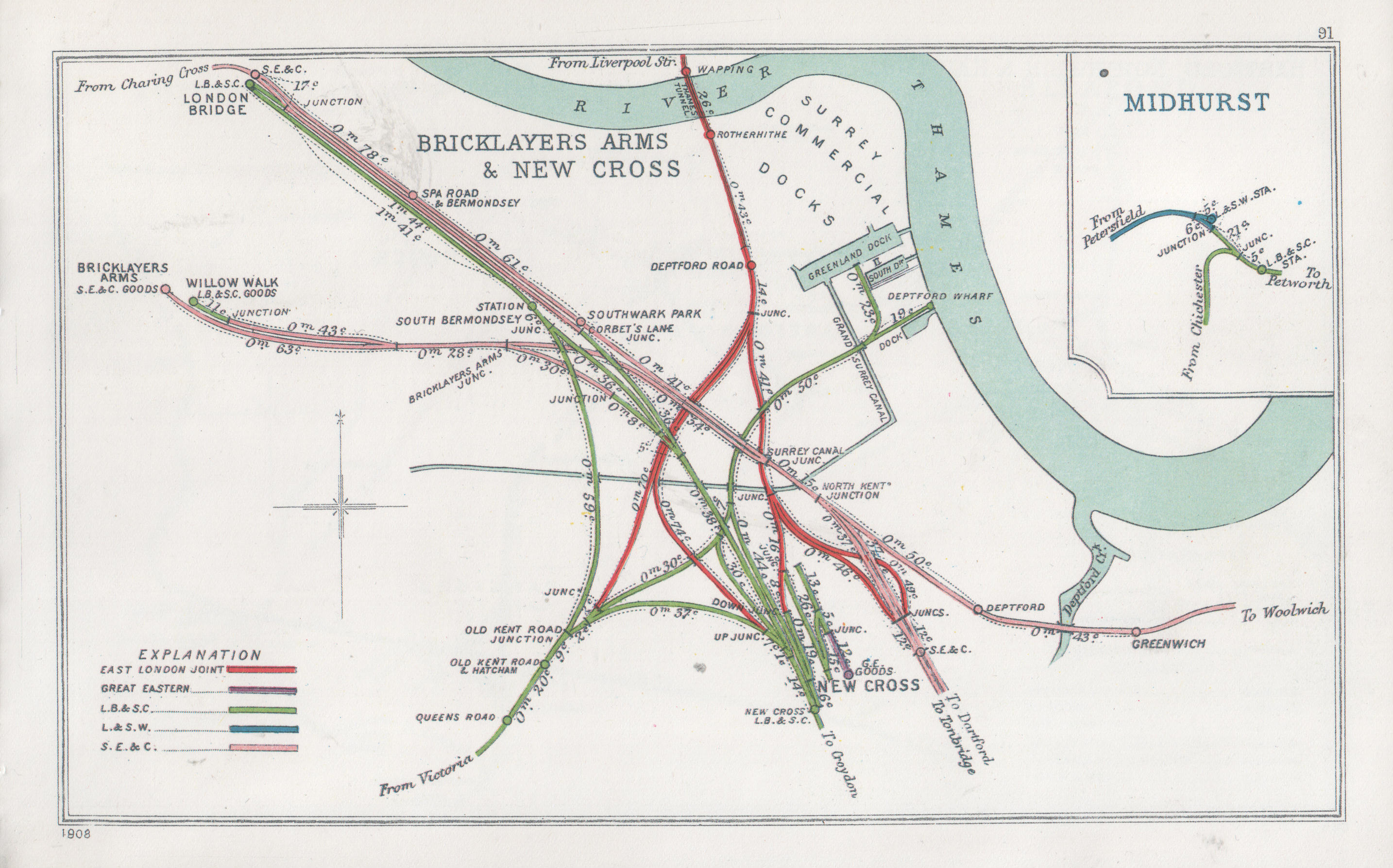
A 1908 Railway Clearing House map of lines around the approaches to London Bridge station

Old Kent Road was a railway station on the South London line section of London, Brighton and South Coast Railway in south London, England. It took its name from the Old Kent Road on which it was located. The station opened on 13 August 1866 and closed on 1 January 1917.

== History ==
The station opened on 13 August 1866 as part of the initial South London line service between London Bridge and Loughborough Park. Service was extended from Loughborough Park to Victoria on 1 May 1867.

It was located on a viaduct to the south of Old Kent Road in the Peckham division of the parish of Camberwell. The boundary with the hamlet of Hatcham in the parish of St Paul Deptford was located just to the east of the station. The railway crossed the road on a bridge.

To the north the next station was South Bermondsey and to the south the next station was Queen's Road. The station was renamed in 1870 to Old Kent Road and Hatcham.

South London line service converted to overhead electric traction from 1 December 1909 and was marketed as the South London Elevated Electric Railway.

The station closed temporarily on 1 January 1917 during the First World War as an economy measure, but was not reopened after the end of the war despite public complaints.

=== East London Railway connection ===
To the north of Old Kent Road the Old Kent Road junction provided a connection to Deptford Road on the East London Railway.

LBSCR passenger service between Old Kent Road and Wapping on the East London Railway commenced on 13 March 1871. Services were extended to Liverpool Street on 11 April 1876 and Peckham Rye on 1 August 1877. From 31 December 1885 the service was cut back to Shoreditch from Liverpool Street.

The passenger train service to East London was withdrawn on 1 June 1911 and the track was removed in 1912.

The connection to the East London line from Old Kent Road junction was restored in December 2012 with services operated by the London Overground.

== Proposed new stations ==
A new station named Surrey Canal on the London Overground is proposed to be situated about 700 metres north of the site of the former Old Kent Road station.

A new London Underground station at Old Kent Road was proposed in 2014 as part of plans for the Bakerloo line extension, for which the route has been safeguarded, as of 2021.

| Preceding station | Disused railways | Following station |
|---|---|---|
| Queen's Road Peckham | London, Brighton & South Coast Railway | South Bermondsey |
