= Glengall Grove =

Street on the Isle of Dogs, London

Coordinates: 51°29′45.71″N 0°0′49.71″W

Glengall Grove is a street on the Isle of Dogs, in London's East End. The street was once part of Glengall Road which stretched across most of the Isle of Dogs.

== History ==
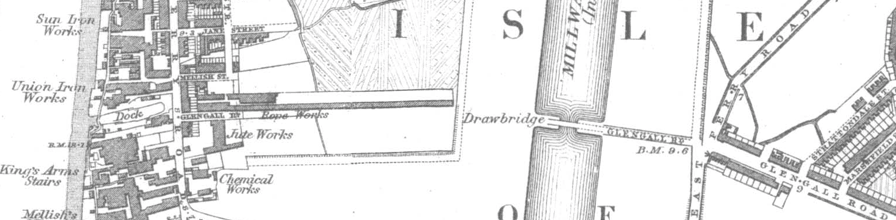
Glengall Road on an 1885 map from the Report of the Boundary Commissioners for England and Wales

Glengall Street appears on Joseph Cross's New Plan of London for 1861, but not on his previous plan of 1850. The name comes from the Richard Butler, 2nd Earl of Glengall who had married Margaret Lauretta Mellish, the daughter of William Mellish, in 1834. Margaret and her sister inherited a large amount of land on the Isle of Dogs, known as the Mellish Estate. After becoming the Countess of Glengall, the trustees of the Mellish inheritance successfully challenged the Earl of Glengall, who was declared bankrupt before dying in 1858. It was thus during this period that Glengall Street and the nearby Mellish Street were named.

Millwall football club, then known as Millwall Rovers' first ever fixture was held on Glengall Road, on 24 October 1885 against a team called St Luke's.

== Legacy ==
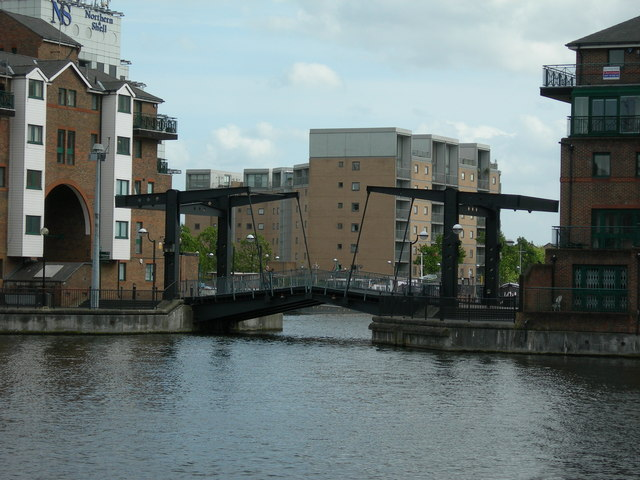
Glengall Bridge in 2007

Glengall Bridge on the current Pepper Street carries the name "Glengall" and is located at the same place that a previous bridge linked the eastern and western parts of Glengall Grove.
