= Russell Green (footballer) =

English footballer and manager

Personal information
- Full name: Norman Russell Green
- Date of birth: 13 August 1933
- Place of birth: Donington, Lincolnshire, England
- Date of death: 21 April 2012 (aged 78)
- Place of death: Gainsborough, Lincolnshire, England
- Position: Wing half

Senior career*
Years	Team	Apps	(Gls)
	Corby Town	?	(?)
1957–1964	Lincoln City	125	(8)
–	Gainsborough Trinity	?	(?)

Managerial career
- 1964–1971: Gainsborough Trinity
- * Club domestic league appearances and goals

Russell Green (13 August 1933 – 21 April 2012) was an English professional footballer who played as a wing half.

== Career ==
Born in Donington, Green made 125 appearances in the Football League for Lincoln City between 1957 and 1964, and also played non-league football for Corby Town and Gainsborough Trinity.

Russell Green, a former blacksmith's apprentice, was an exceptionally strong and fit player, once described as 'a "they shall not pass" sort of player'. He was part of Lincoln City's famous "Great Escape" team of 1957–58, which seemed doomed to relegation from Division 2, but then narrowly avoided the drop by winning all their last 6 games.

Although wing-half was probably his favoured position, Lincoln City manager Bill Anderson frequently played the versatile Green at fullback. During the 1961–62 season he also served a stint playing at centre forward, and scored a match-winning hat trick when Lincoln beat Newport County 3–2.

Subsequently, as captain and player coach at Gainsborough Trinity, Green again played in a variety of positions, this time including centre-half. He led Trinity to the Midlands Counties League championship in the 1966–67 season.
