= 1885–86 Millwall Rovers F.C. season =

Millwall Rovers
1885–86 season
- Chairman: Jasper Sexton
- Manager: Committee
- Stadium: Glengall Road
- Top goalscorer: League: None; All: Unknown
- Highest home attendance: Unknown
- Lowest home attendance: Unknown
Home colours

This is the first season of Millwall Rovers, the club that was to become Millwall. The club's first match was against Fillebrook FC on 3 October 1885.

== Background ==
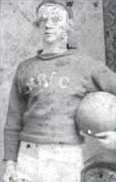
The first Millwall Rovers kit, worn by club secretary Jasper Sexton in 1885.

Millwall Rovers were formed by the workers of J.T. Morton's canning and preserve factory in the Millwall area of London's Isle of Dogs in 1885. First founded in Aberdeen in 1849 to supply sailing ships with food, the company opened their first English cannery and food processing plant at Millwall docks in 1872 and attracted a workforce from across the country, including the east coast of Scotland, primarily Dundee.

The club secretary was seventeen-year-old Jasper Sexton, the son of the landlord of The Islander pub in Tooke Street where Millwall held their meetings. Millwall Rovers' first fixture was on 3 October 1885 against Fillebrook, a team that played in Leytonstone. The newly formed team were well beaten 5–0.

== Season summary ==
Club secretary Jasper Sexton submitted to the Football Annual the following record, of played 24, won 17, drawn 3 and lost 4. Goals 45 for and 28 against. After the away loss to Fillebrook, their first home game was against St Luke's, which they won 2–1. They won their next five games, then a draw, a defeat and four more wins.

== Squad ==
- Duncan Hean
- Patrick Holahan

== Kit ==
Navy blue shirts and white trousers. The initials of the club MRFC were embroidered on the shirt.
