= Surrey Canal railway station =

Planned railway station in South East London

Surrey Canal
- Interactive map of Surrey Canal

General information
- Location: Bermondsey
- Local authority: London Borough of Lewisham
- Managed by: London Overground
- Owner: Transport for London
- Number of platforms: 2
- Accessible: Yes
- Fare zone: 2

Key dates
- October 2011: Funding provided
- January 2012: Planning permission granted
- February 2015: Name changed to New Bermondsey
- November 2021: Name changed to Surrey Canal

Other information
- Coordinates: 51.4844°N 0.0494°W

Surrey Canal railway station (formerly New Bermondsey and Surrey Canal Road) is a proposed station on the Windrush line of the London Overground network. It is on the line from Surrey Quays to Clapham Junction which opened in December 2012.

The site is on Surrey Canal Road where Bermondsey, New Cross and Deptford meet. The station will be adjacent to Millwall Football Club's ground and will mean more routes and trains for match-day crowds other than through South Bermondsey and Surrey Quays stations.

== History ==
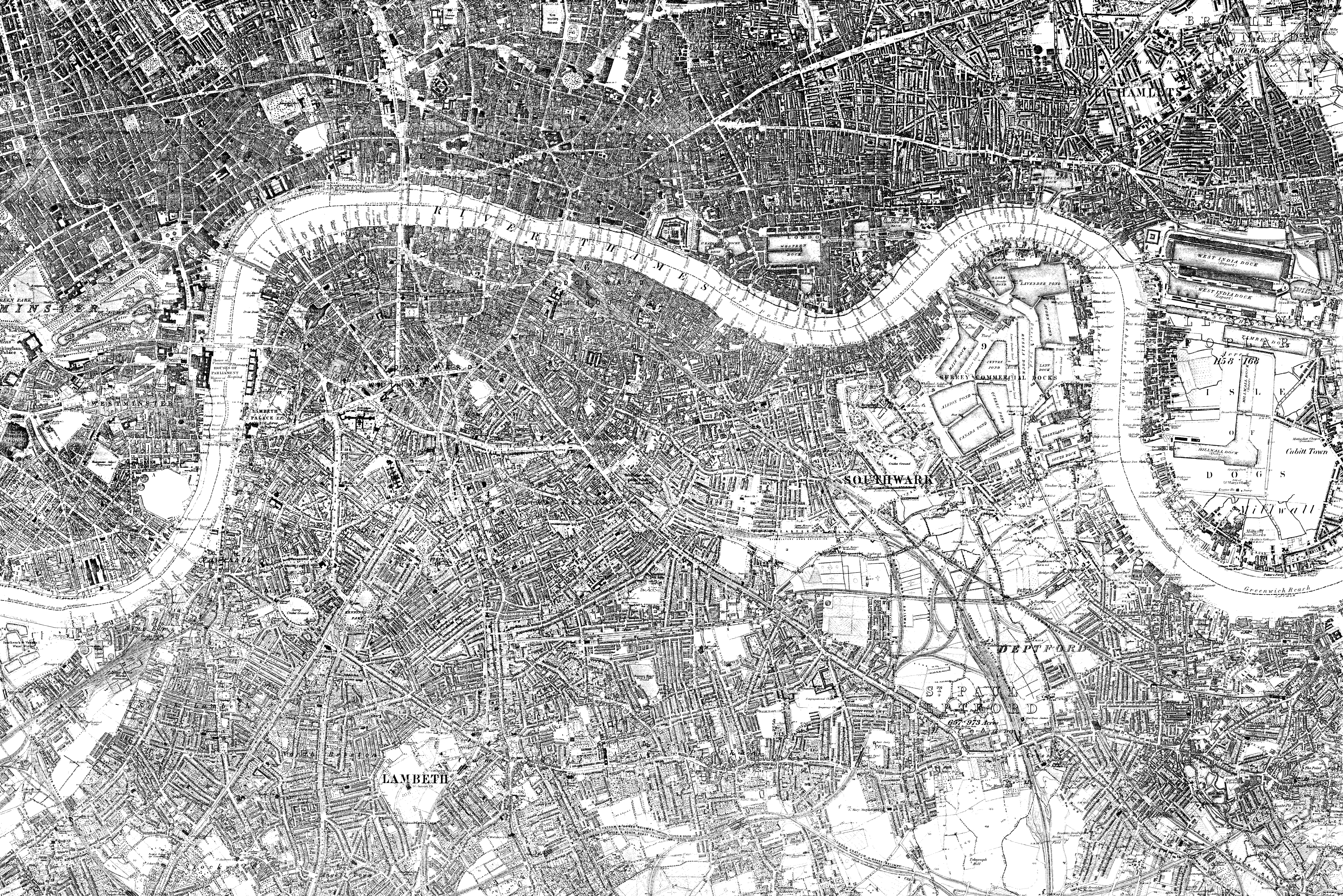
The locale in the 1870s. Click for broader map and to enable varied magnification.

Surrey Canal Road overlies the former Grand Surrey Canal which linked the Tideway's Surrey Commercial Docks at Rotherhithe to wharves at Camberwell and Peckham. Vessels principally carried timber to the docks from the mid-19th century until their closure in the late 1960s. The canal was infilled for safety and disuse in the mid-1970s and turned into the road linking Ilderton Road, SE16, with Trundleys Road, SE8. This area known as the 'Surrey Canal Triangle' was from its early decades by some residents and businesses named the Surrey Canal neighbourhood.

=== Funding doubt and promise ===
It was announced in February 2009 that the line extension would be built but that funding for such a station might not be available.

Lewisham Council agreed in principle in January 2010 to provide the missing funding to complete the station. Transport for London is committed to building the foundations for the station building and platforms to enable construction to take place readily should funding be found. In September 2010, the Department for Transport refused to provide £7 million for building the station as it would not provide good value for money.

=== Renewal proposal ===
In 2014, the developers, Renewal, working in partnership with TfL proposed a re-brand of the area to "New Bermondsey", the name of which was to be used by the station and as the name for a whole new district of London. In 2015, TfL confirmed that the area of major development surrounding the station would be named "New Bermondsey" and that the station would have the same name, and in February 2015, Surrey Canal was renamed New Bermondsey and designated a Housing Zone by the GLA. In December 2015, Section 73 planning consent was granted.

=== 2016–present ===
In September 2016, Lewisham Council's mayor and cabinet voted for use of its purchase order powers at New Bermondsey. In February 2017, an independent inquiry ran to investigate allegations made by Millwall Football Club about New Bermondsey and the Surrey Canal Sports Foundation. In November 2017 the legal experts of the inquiry made their report. It concluded that there was no wrongdoing on the part of Renewal or Lewisham Council.

Amid rising London property prices and thus development returns, in March 2018, the council lost £20 million earmarked as needed for New Bermondsey from the Greater London Authority, of which £12 million for the station.

In August 2019, the government approved a Housing Infrastructure Fund bid for the new station.

Lewisham Council approved a TfL planning application for the station in December 2021, in which the name of the station is confirmed as "Surrey Canal".

In December 2025, Lewisham Council approved additional funding for the new station.

== Local development ==
=== Neptune Wharf ===
In March 2012, planning permission was also granted to create a new residential and leisure development at the junction of Surrey Canal, Trundleys and Grinstead Roads in North Deptford. The scheme will be branded Neptune Wharf, taking its name from the former Neptune Chemical Works which once lined the canal between Trundleys Road and Evelyn Street. Of significance is the plan to re-open part of the canal tow path (currently the dilapidated road, Canal Approach) and opening up of the railway arches between Deptford Park and Folkestone Gardens to create a piazza alongside the new apartments.

Buildings and landscaping will extend between Plough Way and Oxestalls Road down to where the canal ran parallel with Evelyn Street on its last (eastern) leg. The residential apartments will overlook a shallower, very linear, lake replicating part of the canal's route. This is akin to the Albion Channel, about 1/4 mile (0.40 km) north, which emulates Albion Dock – within sight of part of Canada Water station.

=== New Bermondsey ===
A circa £850m expected sale value development around The Den has been approved. It bore working names Surrey Canal: London's Sporting Village and/or the Surrey Canal Triangle. Renewal, the developer, agreed in late 2011 to fund the missing capital needed for the new station, and Lewisham Council's strategic planning committee resolved to grant the application at a meeting on 13 October 2011. Planning permission subject to a so-worded Section 106 agreement was agreed in January 2012, securing its construction.

The developments will now include shops, restaurants, business space and new leisure and sports and multi-faith facilities along with up to 2,400 new homes, replacing warehouses, light industrial estates and a handful of 1990s-built residential blocks. The first two out of five development phases were scheduled for construction between Q2 2018 and 2020.

Future services
Preceding station	London Overground	Following station
Queens Road Peckham towards Clapham Junction or Battersea Park	Windrush line South London line	Surrey Quays towards Dalston Junction
