= Bowling Green Ground =

Football ground in Gainsborough, England

- Interactive map of Bowling Green Ground
- Location: Gainsborough, England
- Coordinates: 53.4039°N 0.7833°W
- Surface: Grass

Tenant
- Gainsborough Trinity

The Bowling Green Ground was a football ground in Gainsborough in England. It was used as a temporary home ground by Gainsborough Trinity during their time in the Football League.

== History ==
The Bowling Green Ground was located to the north-west of Gainsborough town centre. It was an extremely basic ground; there were no spectator facilities, and canvas sheeting borrowed from the local Agricultural Society was erected around the ground when matches were played.

Gainsborough used the Bowling Green Ground and Sincil Bank in Lincoln as an alternative venue when the Northolme was being used for cricket. One match played at the ground was a 3–0 win over Blackpool on 19 April 1902. The site was later converted into housing.
