= Glengall Bridge =

Bridge on the Isle of Dogs, London, England

Coordinates: 51°29′47″N 0°01′01″W

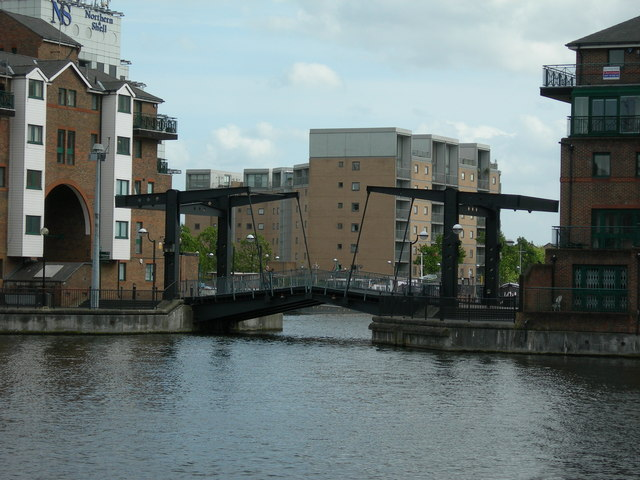
Glengall Bridge

Glengall Bridge is a bridge in the Millwall Inner Dock, Isle of Dogs, London, England, near the Crossharbour DLR station. It is located in the London Borough of Tower Hamlets. The present Dutch-style double-leaf bascule bridge opened in 1990, resembling Langlois Bridge at Arles.The contract to manufacture the bridge across Millwall Dock was awarded to Butterley Engineering Company Ltd; of Ripley, Derbyshire.

The name derives from Glengall Grove which used to extend from West Ferry Road to Manchester Road with a bridge over Millwall Dock at exactly the same spot.

In The World Is Not Enough, James Bond's boat cruises underneath the bridge in the famous water chase scene.
