= Glengall Road =

Millwall F.C.'s first ground from 1885–1886

- The Dockers
- Interactive map of Glengall Road
- Location: Glengall Road; Millwall; Isle of Dogs; London, England
- Coordinates: 51.4949°N 0.023197°W
- Capacity: ~2,000 (standing)
- Surface: Grass
- Field size: 90 x 70 yards

Construction
- Built: Summer, 1885
- Opened: 24 October 1885
- Closed: 23 April 1886

Tenant
- Millwall Rovers F.C. (1885–1886)

Glengall Road was a football ground on the Isle of Dogs in East London. It was the first home of Millwall – then known as Millwall Rovers – from its foundation in 1885 until 1886, when the club moved to the Lord Nelson Ground in the south of the Island. It is the only ground they played in throughout their history within the district of Millwall.

The ground was a piece of wasteland that was converted into a football pitch, which an estimated 2,000 fans would congregate around. To earn revenue, the club wanted a ground they could enclose to charge supporters, so moved after just one season to the Lord Nelson Ground. The team enjoyed a successful first year, winning 17 of their 24 games. Glengall Road no longer exists, and was redeveloped into Tiller Road and Glengall Grove, with Glengall Bridge dividing them.

== History ==
=== Formation and finding a ground ===
"What does it matter if the "Dockers" playing field is surrounded by all that is common to an industrial locality. What if two score chimneys encircle the ground and the blast of ships syren is constantly dinning the ears. The gaunt towering "smoke stacks" are themselves characteristic of the Millwall club. It is a product of the masses; a few labouring men formed it in the year 1885; it relies upon the support of the working classes for its existence."

— Newspaper article titled Of Humble Origin, describing Glengall Road.

In the early 1800s most of the Isle of Dogs was rural and farmland but during the 1850s the majority of the riverside had been industrialsed. The area was known to locals as just 'The Island'. J.T. Morton was founded in Aberdeen in 1849 to supply ships with food, the company expanded and opened their first English cannery plant at Millwall dock in 1872. Millwall Rovers was founded by the workers of J.T. Morton's canning and preserve factory in the Millwall area of the Isle of Dogs in London's East End in the summer of 1885.

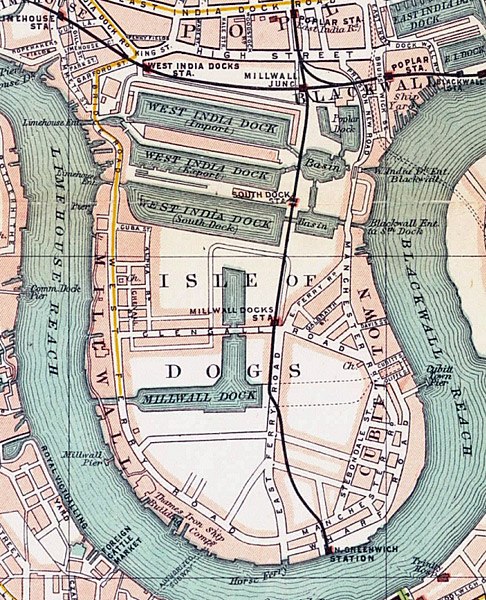
Glengall Road shown on an 1899 map. The road extended across the Isle of Dogs and has since been divided up into Tiller Road and Glengall Grove, with Glengall Bridge separating the two streets. Millwall's ground was on the far left of Glengall Road on this map.

The new club sought a place to play which was close to their factory within the district of Millwall, and decided upon waste ground at the western end of Glengall Road (now called Tiller Road), which was not far from the junction with West Ferry Road. The area was previously used by the Millwall Jute Works, and was left unused except for flytipping. The area was cleared by a volunteer workforce and roughly marked out as a pitch. Players from J.T. Morton's Aberdeen factory, such as Duncan Hean, were brought down especially to play for Millwall. Hean was Rovers' first captain and was described as the 'original promoter' of Millwall on the Island, attracting local dockers as fans to Glengall Road. Supporters would stand along Glengall Road and Millwall Dock Road to watch games, with an estimated 2,000 spectating some of the matches. The pitch was small and constrained due to the heavily built up surroundings of factories and the Millwall outer dock on all sides. It measured no larger than 90 by 70 yards, and was boggy in places.

The club secretary was 17-year-old Jasper Sexton, the son of the landlord of The Islander pub in Tooke Street. Millwall held their club meetings here, and due to it being a five minute walk from Glengall Road, also used it as a changing room for the team during matches. The club stored their brake here, an open wagon with seats decked in the clubs' blue and white colours, for travel to away games. Millwall Rovers' first home fixture at Glengall Road was a game against St Luke's on 24 October 1885, which they won 2–1. The new club won nine, lost one, and one game was drawn in their first eleven games at their new ground. Their first and only home defeat was against the top club in East London at the time, Old St Paul's, who beat Millwall 4–0. Throughout their first season of existence, Millwall played 24, won 17, lost four, and three games were drawn. They scored 45 goals and conceded 28. On 23 April 1886, Rovers played their last game at Glengall Road, a 3–1 win against Westminster Swifts.

=== Relocation ===
Rovers searched for a better playing surface for the 1886–87 season, which could be enclosed so they could charge paying customers and expand from playing friendlies into playing in competitions, such as the London Senior Cup and East End Senior Cup. They found an area behind a pub just under a mile away (1.21 km) in Cubitt Town, on the south end of The Island. This became known as the Lord Nelson Ground. No trace remains of the Glengall Road ground today, after World War II bombing and housing redevelopment completely changed the area. The Docklands Business Centre and Caravel Close now sit on the site of the ground, both on Tiller Road, E14.
