= Joseph Cross (cricketer) =

English cricketer

Joseph John Cross (23 February 1849 – 2 November 1918) was an English cricketer. He was a right-handed batsman who played for Gloucestershire. He was born in Merriott, Somerset and died in Lambridge, Bath, Somerset.

Cross made his first-class debut in July 1870 against Surrey. From the lower order, he scored a duck in the only innings in which he batted, as Gloucestershire won the match by an innings margin, restricting Surrey to what was, at the time, their lowest first-class score against a county side.

Cross' second and final first-class appearance came the following week against the MCC, against whom he scored his only runs in first-class cricket in the first innings of the match. Gloucestershire again won this match by an innings margin, thanks to an innings of 172 from WG Grace, and Cross scored five runs.
