= Gainsborough Trinity F.C. =

Association football club in England

- Full name: Gainsborough Trinity Football Club
- Nicknames: Trinity, The Holy Blues
- Founded: 1873
- Ground: The Northolme
- Capacity: 4,340 (504 seated)
- Chairman: Dave Horsley & John Myskiw
- Manager: Russ Wilcox
- League: Northern Premier League Premier Division
- 2025–26: Northern Premier League Premier Division, 7th of 21
- Website: gainsboroughtrinity.com
Home colours	Away colours

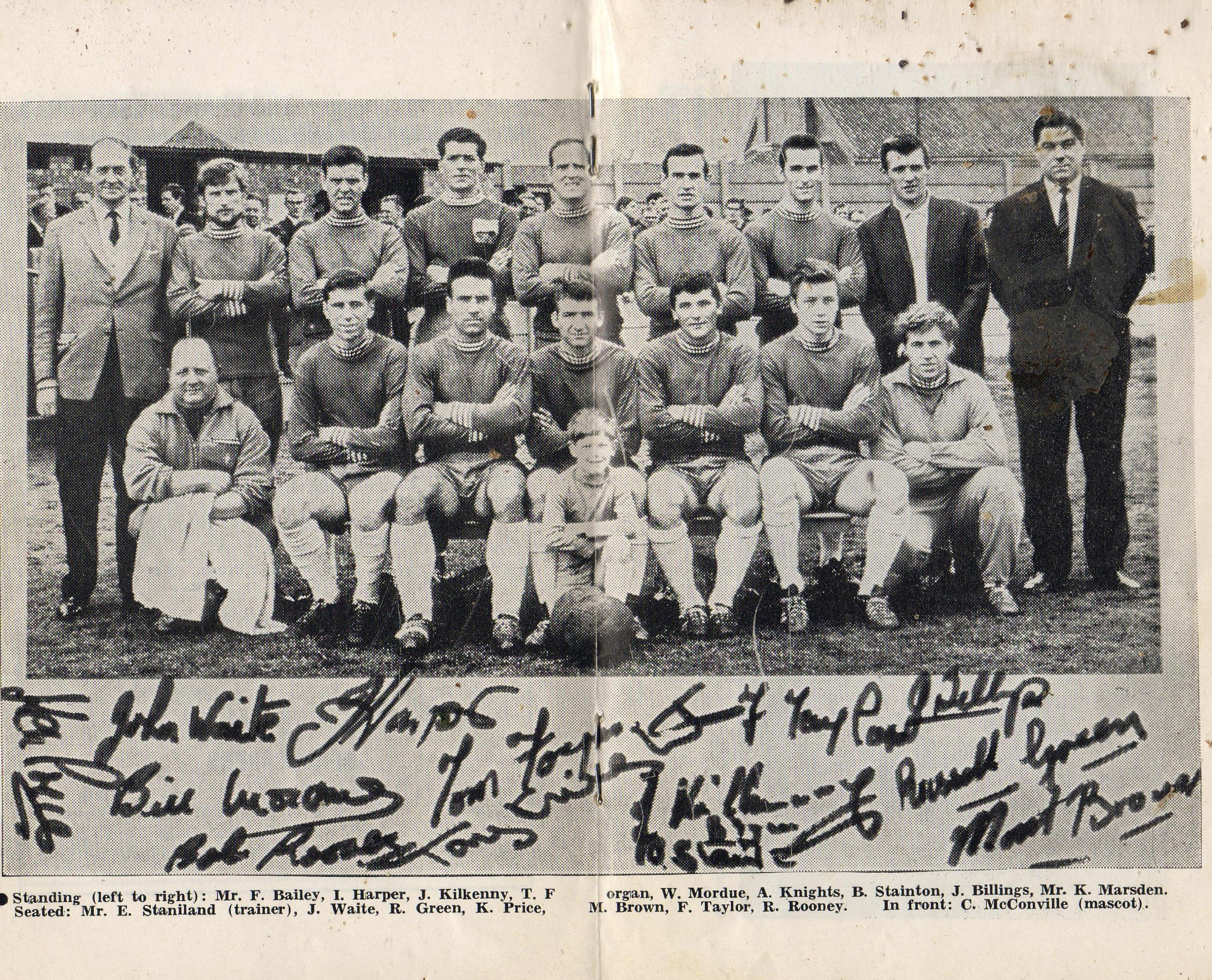
Gainsborough Trinity squad photo for 1966–67

Gainsborough Trinity Football Club is a football club based in Gainsborough, Lincolnshire, England. Established in 1873, the club became members of the Football League in 1896 and remained members of the Second Division until 1912, making Gainsborough one of the smallest towns in England to have had a Football League team. They are currently members of the Northern Premier League Premier Division, the seventh tier of English football, and play at the Northolme.

== History ==
The club was established in 1873 as Trinity Recreationists by the Reverend George Langton Hodgkinson, vicar of Holy Trinity parish, Gainsborough. In 1889 they were founder members of the Midland League and were league champions in 1890–91. The club finished as runners-up the following season and again in 1895–96, after which they applied for election to the Football League. In the vote they finished third, ahead of existing members Port Vale and Crewe Alexandra, and were elected into the Second Division. The club's first season in Division Two of the League saw them finish seventh, but a gradual decline in form saw them finish in the bottom half of the table every season until 1904. In 1901–02 Trinity finished bottom of the division, but were re-elected. In 1904–05 the club finished sixth in Division Two, their best performance during their Football League membership.

In 1911–12 Gainsborough finished bottom of the Second Division for a second time, and failed to be re-elected, receiving just nine votes to the 27 received by newly elected Lincoln City. The club returned to the Midland League, finishing third in 1912–13 and second in 1913–14, after which they unsuccessfully applied for readmission to the Football League. When the Football League created a new Third Division North in 1921, Trinity applied for membership, but were again unsuccessful. The club won the Midland League title in 1927–28, and the following season defeated Football League opposition in the FA Cup for the first time since losing their League status, beating Crewe 3–1 in the first round, before losing to Chesterfield in the second round. In 1931–32 they beat Crewe again in the first round, before losing 5–2 at home to Watford. In 1937–38 Trinity beat Port Vale in the first round, before losing to fellow non-League club Yeovil & Petters United. Another Football League team was beaten the following season, when Trinity knocked out Gateshead in the first round, before losing to Doncaster Rovers.

Following World War II Gainsborough had further success in the FA Cup, reaching the first round of the FA Cup in 1945–46, losing to Mansfield Town, and in 1946–47, when they were beaten by Darlington. In 1948–49 they reached the second round after defeating Witton Albion in the first round, before losing 4–3 at Walsall. They went on to win a third Midland League title that season. First round appearances in the FA Cup followed in 1950–51 (losing 3–0 to Plymouth) and 1951–52 (losing to Witton), before the 1952–53 season saw another second round appearance; after beating Netherfield in a first round replay, they lost 2–1 at Newport County. They reached the first round again the following season, before losing 4–1 at home to Chesterfield. The club failed to repeat the feat until 1959–60, when they lost to Doncaster Rovers in a replay.

At the end of the 1959–60 season, the Midland League was disbanded. Gainsborough spent a single season playing in both the Central Alliance and Division Two of the Yorkshire League, before returning to a reformed Midland League in 1961. Trinity won their fourth Midland League title in 1966–67, also reaching the first round of the FA Cup (losing 1–0 at home to Colchester United), before becoming founder members of the new Northern Premier League in 1968. The club applied to join the Football League again in 1975 and 1976, but received only a single vote on each occasion. The 1983–84 season saw them reach the first round of the FA Cup for the first time in over a decade, as they lost 2–0 at home to Blackpool.

When the Northern Premier League added a second division in 1987, Gainsborough were placed in the Premier Division. In 1997–98 FA Cup saw them drawn against local rivals Lincoln City, who after a 1–1 draw lost 3–2 in a 'home' replay that was played at Lincoln's Sincil Bank. Another first round appearance in 2003–04 ended with a 7–1 defeat at Brentford. At the end of the season a tenth-place finish saw the club become founder members of the Conference North. FA Cup first round appearances followed in 2006–07 (a 3–1 defeat by Barnet) and 2007–08 (a 6–0 loss at home to Hartlepool United). In 2011–12 the club finished fourth, qualifying for the promotion play-offs. However, after beating FC Halifax Town in the semi-finals, Trinity lost the final 1–0 to Nuneaton Town. During the 2012–13 season they reached the semi-finals of the FA Trophy and managed to beat Wrexham 2–1 at home but would lose 4–3 on aggregate. In another FA Cup first round appearance in 2015–16, the club were beaten 1–0 by Shrewsbury Town. The club were relegated for the first time in their history at the end of the 2017–18 season, dropping into the Northern Premier League's Premier Division.

Gainsborough finished fourth in the Premier Division in 2022–23, qualifying for the promotion play-offs. They subsequently lost 5–3 on penalties to Bamber Bridge in the semi-finals after a 1–1 draw. In 2024–25 the club reached the second round of the FA Cup for the first time since the 1950s after beating Hednesford Town on penalties (after a 4–4 draw) in the first round. They lost 1–0 at Harrogate Town in the second round which was televised on BBC Two.

== Ground ==
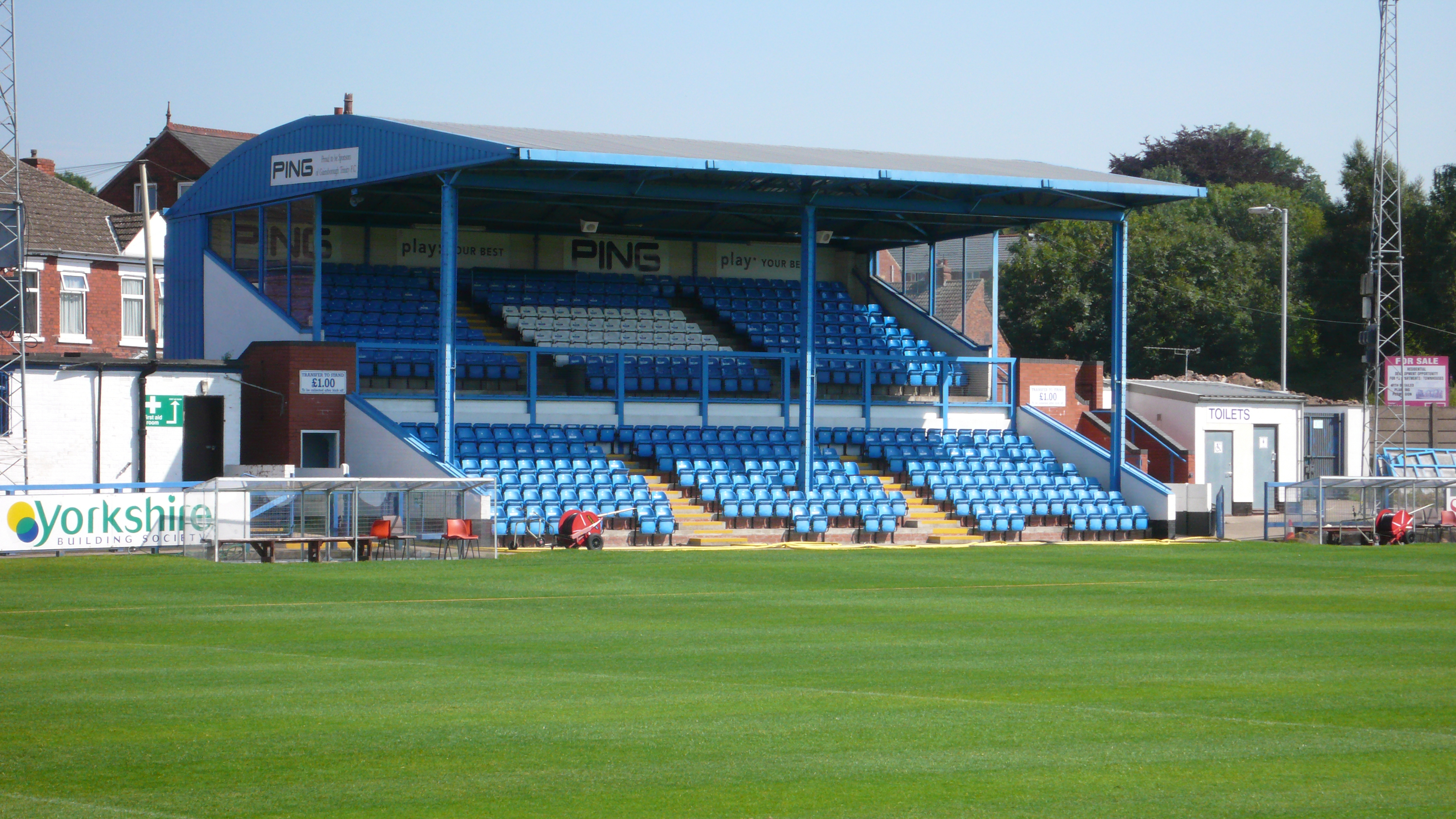
The Northolme

Trinity moved to the Northolme ground, then also a cricket venue, in 1884. During their time in the Football League the club also played home matches at the Bowling Green Ground in the north-west of the town and Sincil Bank in Lincoln when the Northolme was being used for cricket. The record attendance of 9,760 was set for a Midland League match against local rivals Scunthorpe United in 1948.

== Current squad ==
As of 19 August 2026

Note: Flags indicate national team as defined under FIFA eligibility rules; some limited exceptions apply. Players may hold more than one non-FIFA nationality.

No.	Pos.	Nation	Player
—	GK	ENG	Callum Hawkins
—	GK	ENG	David Robson
—	DF	ENG	Harrison Beeden
—	DF	ENG	Ben Blythe
—	DF	ENG	Ashley Jackson
—	DF	ENG	Jack Leckie
—	DF	ENG	Jacob McLoughlin
—	DF	ENG	Ashton Offler
—	DF	ENG	Aaron Simpson
—	DF	ENG	Harvey Sutcliffe

No.	Pos.	Nation	Player
—	MF	ENG	Lewis Butroid (vice-captain)
—	MF	ENG	Jordan Helliwell
—	MF	ENG	George Hornshaw
—	MF	ENG	Bobby Johnson (captain)
—	MF	SCO	Fraser Preston
—	MF	ENG	Elliott Whitehouse
—	FW	ENG	Connor Brown
—	FW	ENG	Javelle Clarke
—	FW	ENG	Theo Williams

== Rivals and local games ==
Gainsborough Trinity's location on the bank of the River Trent pits them against a host of clubs from Lincolnshire and Nottinghamshire. The most noted local derbies for Gainsborough are against Boston United and Worksop Town, as both clubs have spent numerous seasons in both the Northern Premier League and Conference North divisions with Trinity. Games with Boston or Worksop are traditionally played on Boxing Day and New Year's Day.

Professional clubs in traditional Lincolnshire such as Lincoln City, Scunthorpe United and Grimsby Town have rarely played Trinity outside of pre-season tournaments such as the Lincolnshire Senior Cup. The last competitive match between Trinity and a professional Lincolnshire club was when they played Lincoln City in the first round of the FA Cup in the 1996–97 season, with Trinity eventually losing 3–2 in the replay following a 1–1 draw at Sincil Bank.

== Club officials ==
As of 14 November 2023

Position	Name
Chairman	Dave Horsley
President	Steve Summers
Director	Darren Ashley
Club Secretary	Matt Boles
Manager	Russ Wilcox
Assistant Manager/Goalkeeping Coach	Kevin Pressman
Kitman	Jed Hallam

== Managerial history ==
Dates	Name	Notes	First Game	Last Game	P	W	D	L
1959–1960	(England) Charles Walker							
1960–1961	(England) Tom Daley							
1961–1963	(England) Gladstone Guest							
1964–1971	(England) Russell Green							
1971–1973	(England) Jim Kilkenny							
?-?	(England) Bobby Ham							
1979–1980	(England) Roy Ellam							
1980–1981	(England) Neil Warnock							
1985–1987	(Scotland) Pat Buckley							
1991–1993	(England) Gary Simpson		24 August 1991	9 October 1993	96	30	26	40
1993–1994	(Wales) Leighton James		26 October 1993	3 January 1994	11	4	3	4
1994–1995	(England) Gary Brook		12 February 1994	29 April 1995	52	18	15	19
1995–1998	(England) Ernie Moss		19 August 1995	27 April 1998	128	60	34	34
1998–1999	(Scotland) Steve Richards		22 August 1998	15 October 1999	52	23	10	19
1999–2000	(England) Ernie Moss		6 November 1999	24 April 2000	33	11	13	9
2000	(England) Greg Fee		19 August 2000	21 October 2000	14	2	4	8
2000–2001	(England) Phil Tingay		24 October 2000	20 October 2001	44	20	13	11
2001	(England) Phil Brown & (England) Frank Nicholson	Caretakers	27 October 2001	17 November 2001	5	2	1	2
2001–2002	(England) Dave Norton	Player/Manager	24 November 2001	23 April 02	25	6	6	13
2002–2003	(England) Phil Stant	Player/Manager	17 August 2002	26 April 2003	44	16	11	17
2003–2007	(England) Paul Mitchell		16 August 2003	1 December 2007	186	63	51	72
2007–2009	(England) Steve Charles	Caretaker until 5 January 2008 then permanent	8 December 2007	17 August 2009	72	24	22	26
2009	(England) Dave Reeves & (England) Steve Blatherwick	Caretaker Managers	22 August 2009	22 August 2009	1	0	0	1
2009	(England) Adie Moses	Caretaker Manager	22 August 2009	28 August 2009	3	1	0	2
2009–2011	(England) Brian Little		28 August 2009	20 August 2011	80	25	17	38
2011–2016	(England) Steve Housham		20 August 2011	8 March 2016	201	80	36	85
2016–2017	(England) Dominic Roma	Player/Manager	12 March 2016	4 February 2017				
2017	(England) Adam Quinn	Caretaker Manager	11 February 2017	11 February 2017				
2017–2018	(England) Dave Frecklington		18 February 2017	5 February 2018				
2018	(England) Nathan Jarman & Adam Quinn	Caretaker Managers	10 February 2018	10 February 2018	1	0	0	1
2018–2019	(England) Lee Sinnott							
2019	(England) Ross Hannah & Liam King							
2019–2021	(England) Curtis Woodhouse							
2021–2022	(England) Tom Shaw							
2022–2023	(England) Neal Bishop & Damon Parkinson							
2023	(England) Neal Bishop							
2023	(England) Darryn Stamp							
2023–	(England) Russ Wilcox							

== Honours ==
- Midland League
  - Champions 1890–91, 1927–28, 1948–49, 1966–67
- Northern Premier League
  - Challenge Cup winners 1981–82, 1996–97
- Lincolnshire Senior Cup
  - Winners 1889–90, 1892–93, 1894–95, 1897–98, 1903–04, 1904–05, 1906–07, 1910–11, 1970–71, 2002–03, 2017–18
- Lincolnshire County Senior Cup
  - Winners 1946–47, 1947–48, 1948–49
- Lincolnshire Senior 'A' Cup
  - Winners 1950–51, 1951–52, 1957–58, 1958–59, 1963–64
- Lincolnshire Shield
  - Winners 2007–08, 2011–12

== Records ==
- Best FA Cup performance: Third round, 1886–87
- Best FA Trophy performance: Semi-finals, 2012–13
- Record attendance: 9,760 vs Scunthorpe United, Midland League, 1948
- Biggest victory: 7–0 vs Fleetwood Town; 7–0 vs Great Harwood Town
- Heaviest defeat: 1–7 vs Stalybridge Celtic, Northern Premier League, 2000–01; 1–7 vs Brentford, FA Cup, 2003–04
- Record transfer fee paid: £3,000 to Burton Albion for Stuart Lowe
- Record transfer fee received: £30,000 from Lincoln City for Tony James

== See also ==
- Gainsborough Trinity F.C. players
- Gainsborough Trinity F.C. managers
