= The Northolme =

Football ground in Gainsborough, Lincolnshire, England

- KAL Group Stadium
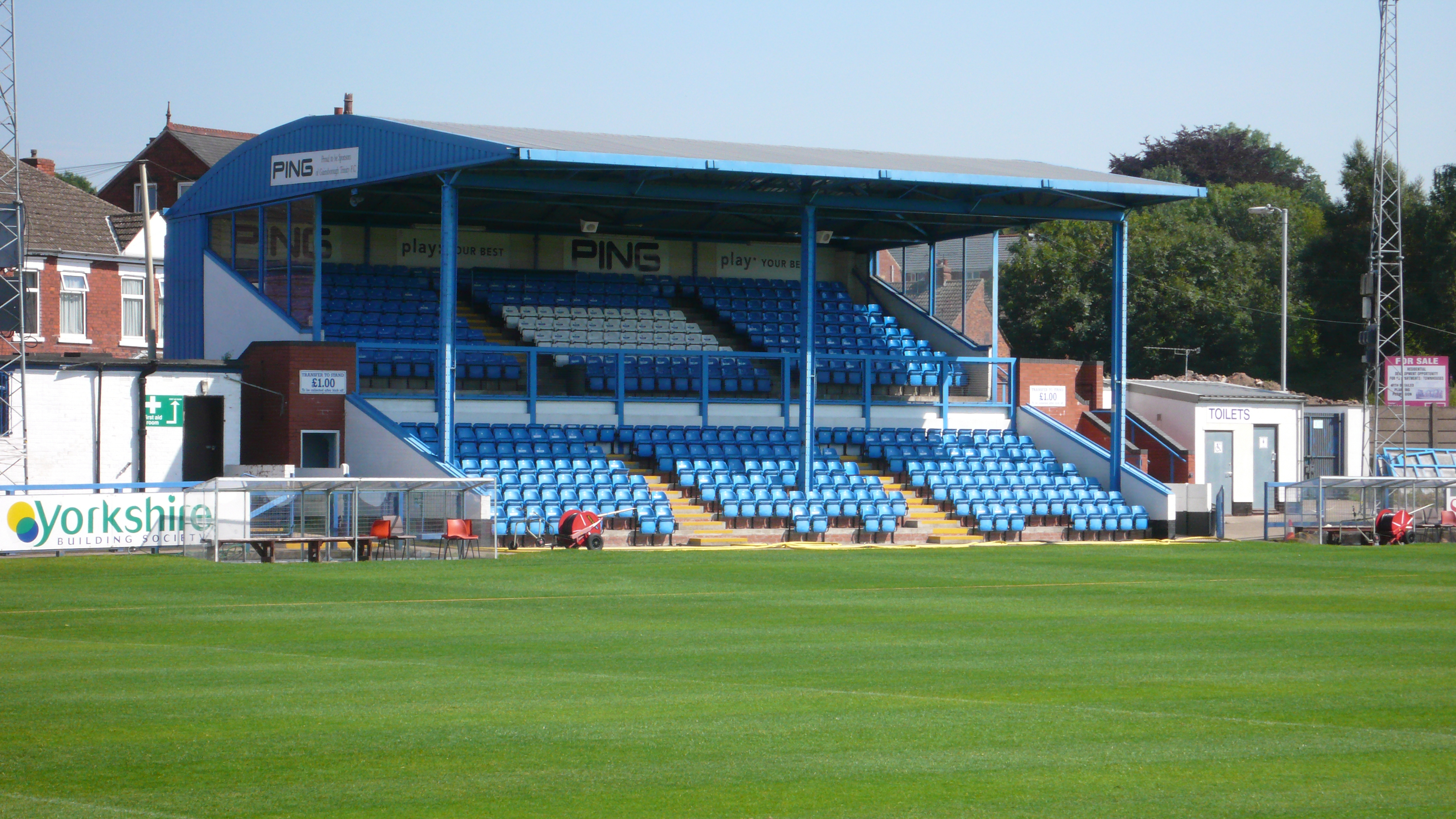
- The Ping stand.
- Interactive map of The Northolme
- Location: Gainsborough, England
- Coordinates: 53°24′12″N 0°46′28″W
- Owner: Gainsborough Trinity Supporters' Club
- Capacity: 4,304 (504 seated)
- Surface: Grass
- Public transit: Gainsborough Central (0.6mi); Gainsborough Lea Road (1.4mi)

Construction
- Opened: 1850s

Tenants
- Gainsborough Trinity (1884–); Worksop Town (1988–1992); Boston United (2020)

The Northolme (known as the KAL Group Stadium for sponsorship purposes) is a football ground in Gainsborough, Lincolnshire, England. It is the home ground of Gainsborough Trinity, it has a capacity of 4,304, of which 504 is seated.

== History ==
The Northolme was opened in the 1850s, and was originally used as a cricket ground. Gainsborough Trinity moved to the ground in 1884, at which time the only spectator facility was a small covered stand in the south-west corner of the ground. Players used the nearby Sun Inn for changing rooms, with the pub building a special extension for use by the football club.

A 200-seat grandstand was later added along the southern touchline, along with a covered terrace on the northern side of the pitch. Trinity were elected to the Football League in 1896, and the first League match at the ground was played on 12 September 1896, with 2,000 spectators watching a 1–1 draw with Manchester City. The ground was still used for cricket, and Trinity occasionally had to play matches at the Bowling Green Ground in the north-west of the town and Sincil Bank in Lincoln. The record attendance for a Football League match at the Northolme was set on 29 April 1911, when 5,600 saw Trinity beat Chelsea 3–1.

Gainsborough were voted out of the Football League at the end of the 1911–12 season, and returned to the Midland League. The ground's record attendance of 9,760 was set for a Midland League match against local rivals Scunthorpe United in the 1940s. During the same decade the stand on the southern touchline burnt down and a new grandstand was built on the northern touchline.

In 1988, Worksop Town lost their Central Avenue ground, and were forced to groundshare at the Northolme until 1992. A similar request was rejected in 2008.

For the beginning of the 2020–21 season, rivals Boston United were granted permission to use the Northolme as their home ground temporarily whilst finishing touches were applied to their new stadium.

On 28 September 2023, Scunthorpe United announced that, after its upcoming National League North game against Brackley Town, future fixtures would be played at The Northolme, due to a land dispute with Glanford Park's owner. Gainsborough Trinity, however, released a statement stating that Scunthorpe's announcement was issued without their knowledge or consent. Scunthorpe continued to play at Glanford Park in late October as negotiations over their ground's ownership continued, and on 16 November 2023, the club exchanged contracts to buy Glanford Park.

== Gallery ==
Stadium gallery

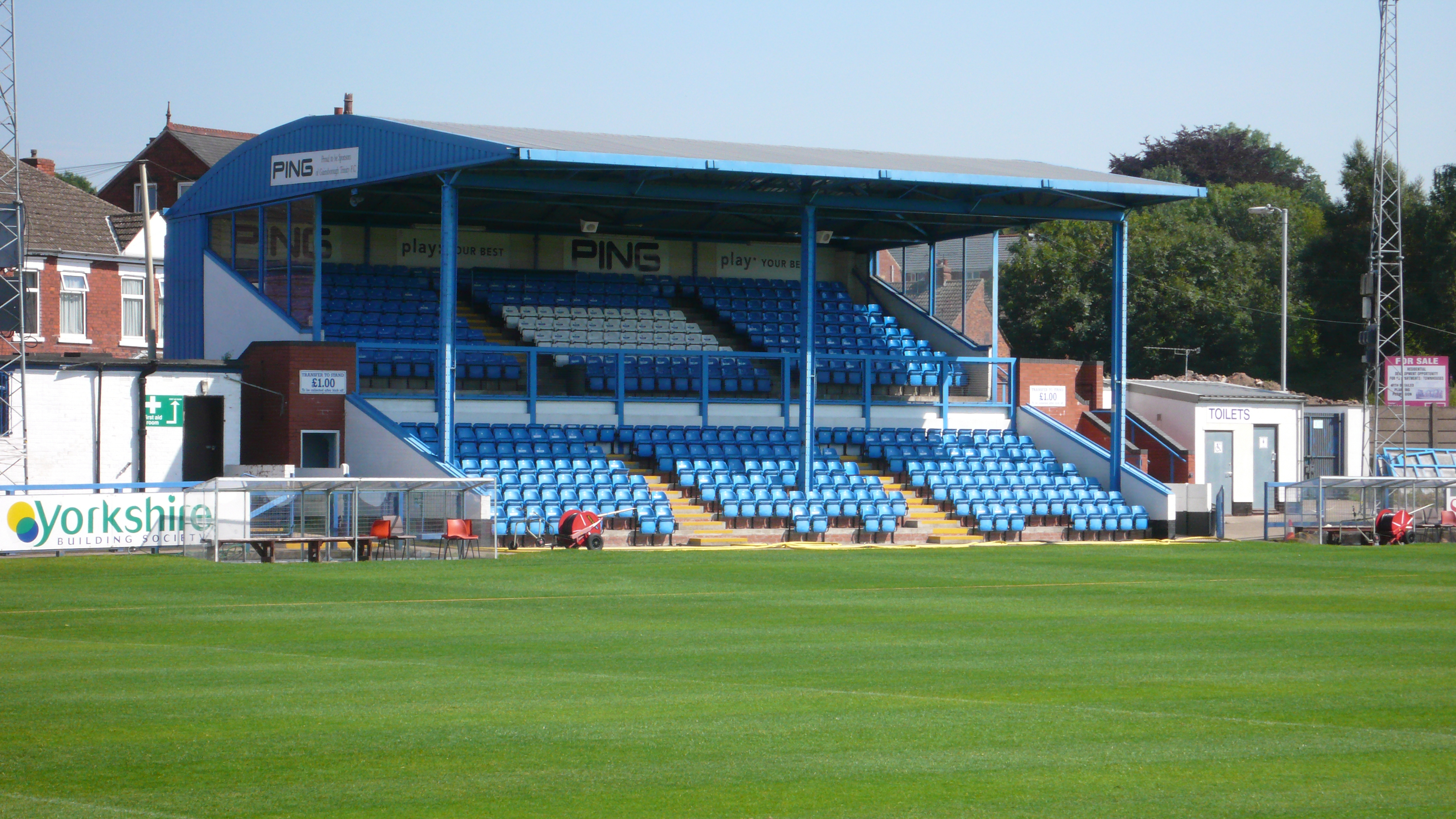
The Ping stand on the north side of the ground.

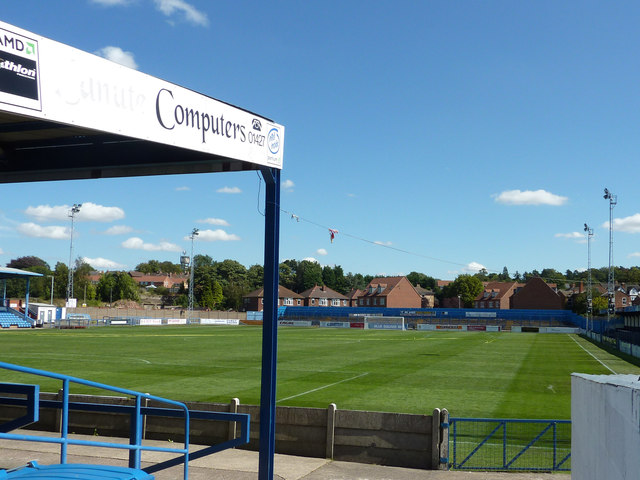
Looking in from the Town Terrace.

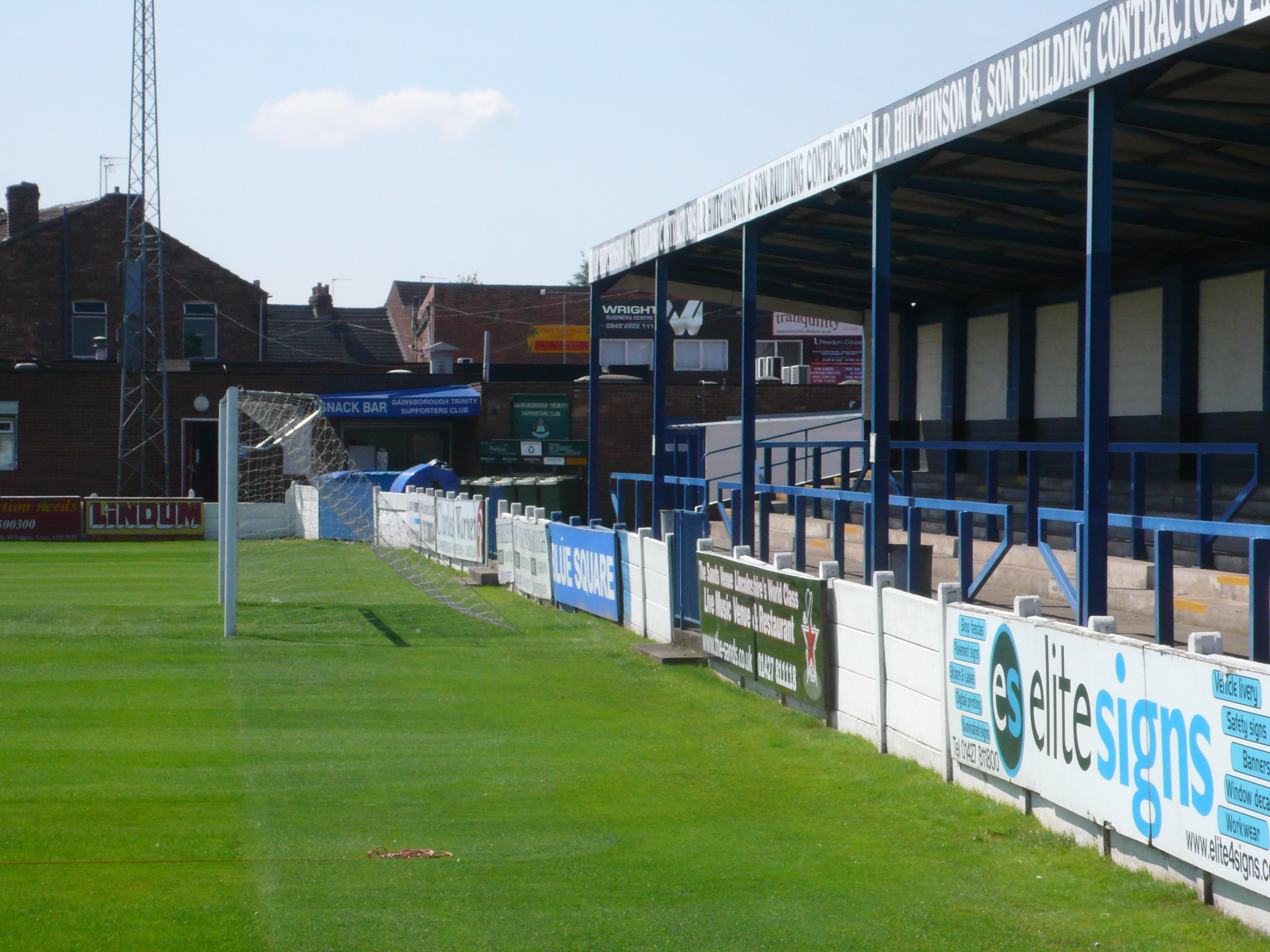
The Town Terrace to the right.

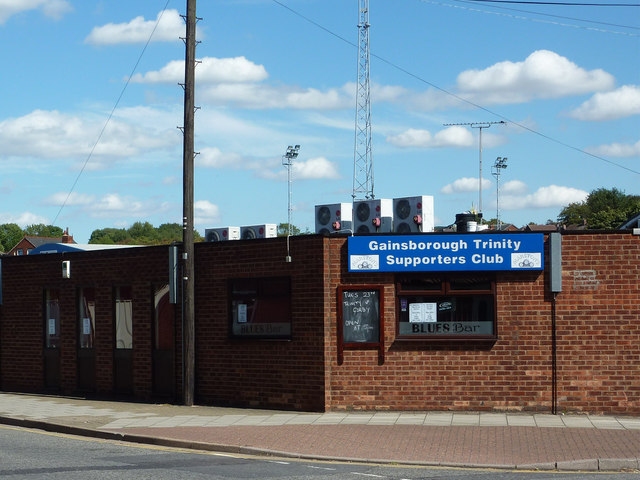
The Blues Club on the south west corner of the ground.
