= Clifton Grove =

Football ground in Rotherham, England

- Interactive map of Clifton Grove
- Location: Rotherham, England
- Coordinates: 53.4304°N 1.3389°W
- Surface: Grass

Construction
- Opened: 1891
- Closed: 1896

Tenant
- Rotherham Town

Clifton Grove was a football ground in Rotherham, England. It was the home ground of the original Rotherham Town club.

== History ==
The ground was opened on 26 September 1891 for a Midland League game between Rotherham and Grantham Rovers. It was located to the east of Rotherham town centre and consisted of a covered seated stand on the northern touchline, which had been moved from the club's previous Clifton Lane cricket ground and an open seated stand behind the eastern goal.

In 1893 the club was elected to the Football League, and the first League match at Clifton Grove was played on 9 September 1893, with Rotherham defeating Grimsby Town in front of 3,000 spectators. This was also the highest League attendance recorded at the ground, and was equalled on 1 September 1894 for a 3–1 defeat by Burton Wanderers.

In 1896 the club was voted out of the Football League and subsequently folded. The last League game at Clifton Grove was played on 16 March 1896 with just 300 watching a 2–2 draw against Lincoln City. After the club folded, the ground was subsequently used for housing.
