= South Bermondsey railway station =

National Rail station in London, England

South Bermondsey
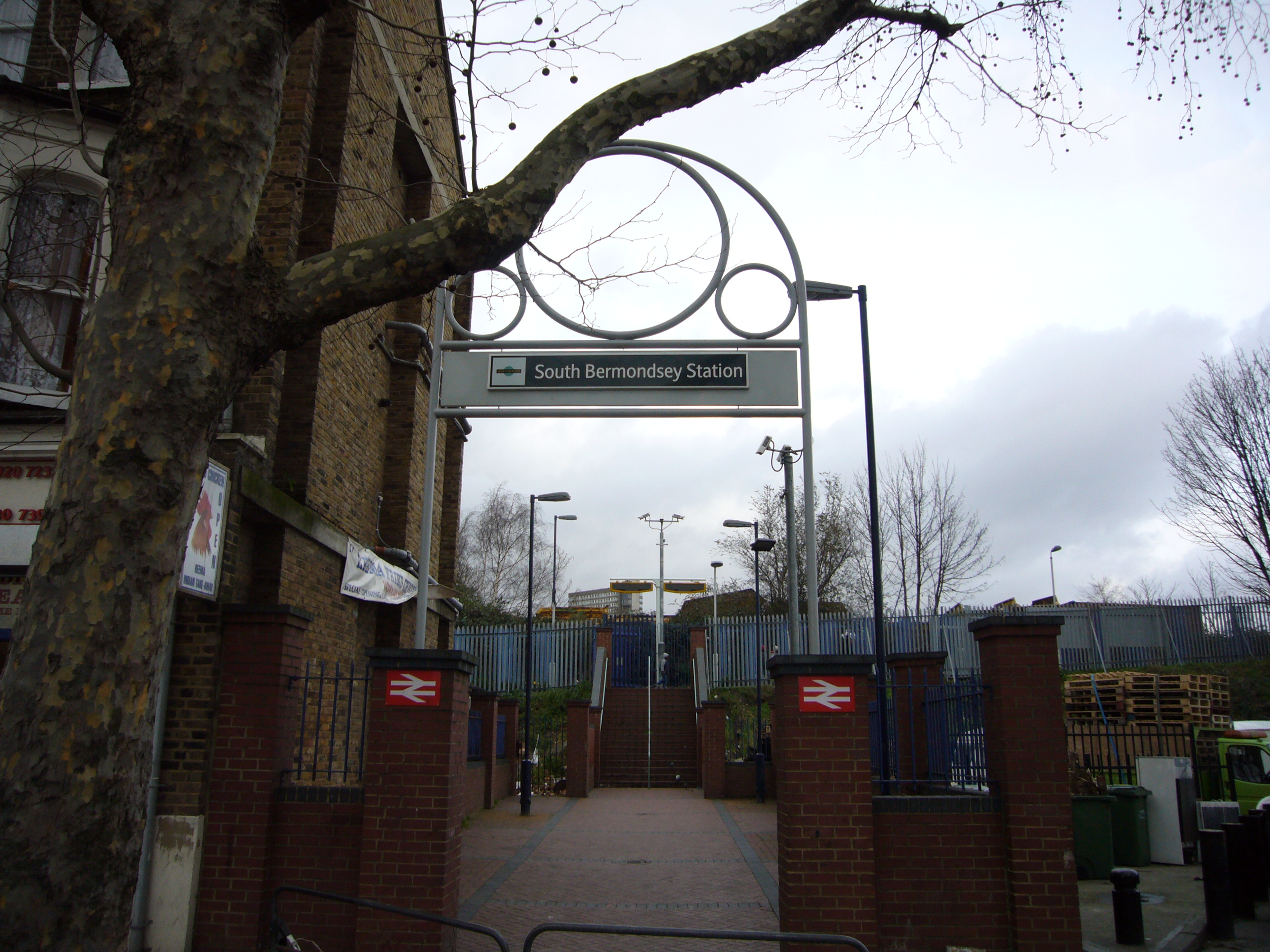
- Interactive map of South Bermondsey

General information
- Location: South Bermondsey
- Local authority: Southwark
- Managed by: Southern
- Station code: SBM
- DfT category: E
- Number of platforms: 2
- Fare zone: 2

National Rail annual entry and exit
- 2020–21: ▼0.259 million
- 2021–22: ▲0.460 million
- 2022–23: ▲0.495 million
- 2023–24: ▲0.537 million
- 2024–25: ▲0.633 million

Railway companies
- Pre-grouping: London, Brighton and South Coast Railway
- Post-grouping: Southern Railway

Key dates
- 13 August 1866: Opened
- 1 January 1917: Closed
- 1 May 1919: Reopened
- 17 June 1928: New station opened

Other information
- External links: Departures; Facilities
- Coordinates: 51.4878°N 0.0544°W

South Bermondsey railway station is on the South London line, serving the district of South Bermondsey in the London Borough of Southwark and managed and operated by Southern. It is 1 mile 63 chains (2.9 km) down the line from London Bridge; the following station on the line is Queens Road Peckham. The station is the principal stop for Millwall F.C.'s The Den.

== History ==
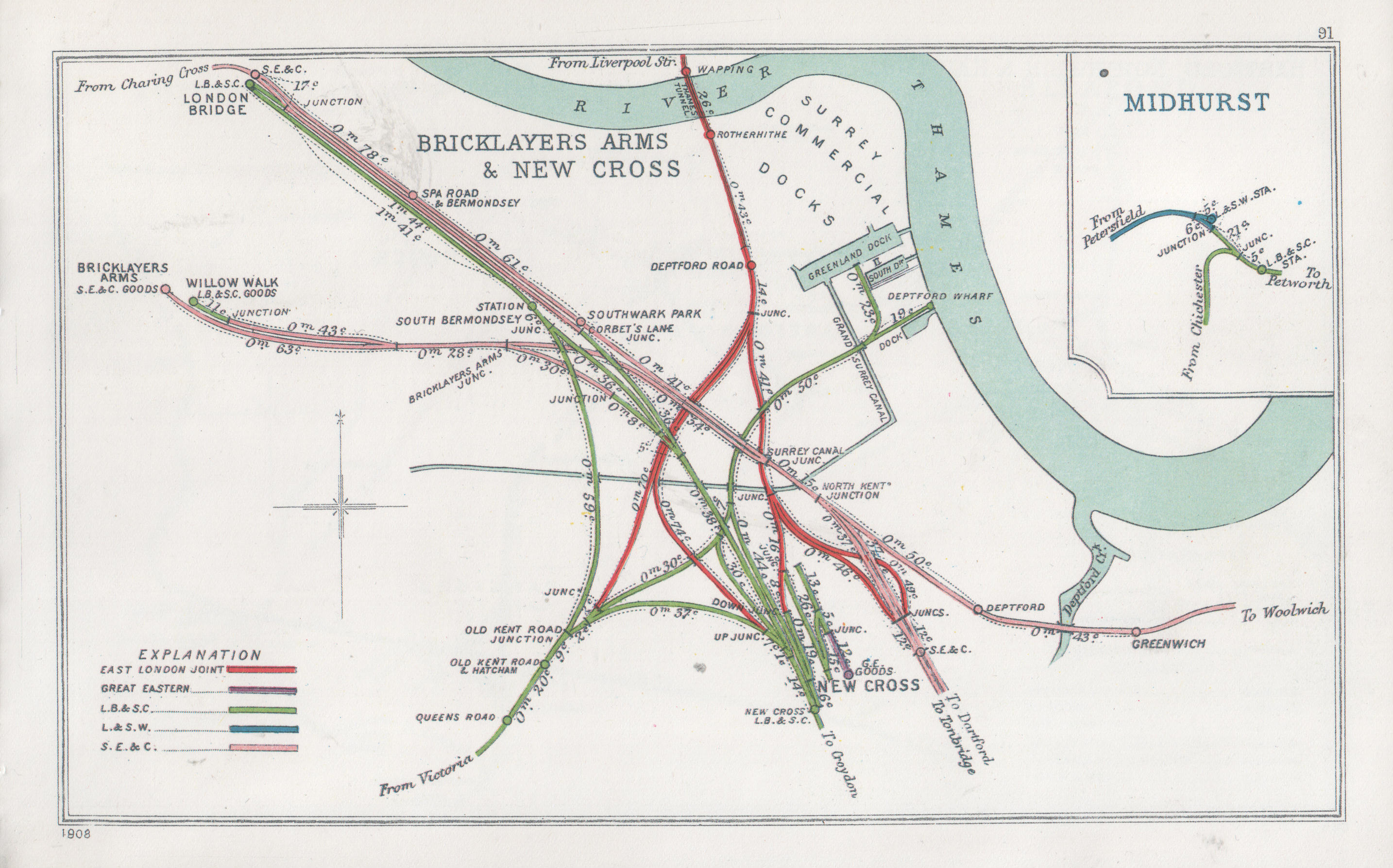
A 1908 Railway Clearing House map of lines around the approaches to London Bridge, showing the original position of South Bermondsey station

The original station was situated to the north-west of South Bermondsey Junction, on the northern side of Rotherhithe New Road, very close to the now-closed Southwark Park railway station. It opened on 13 August 1866 with the South London Line, and was originally named Rotherhithe. On 1 December 1869 it was renamed South Bermondsey; Rotherhithe railway station less than a mile away opened six days later.

The original station closed on 17 June 1928, when the present station, situated south of South Bermondsey Junction, took its place. The 1928 station is on an embankment, and its platforms and buildings are of wooden construction; the current passenger access to the station from Rotherhithe New Road and Ilderton Road is by a footpath partly constructed on the embankment previously occupied by the line to Bricklayers Arms and Willow Walk Goods Depots. In 1993, football club Millwall opened their ground The Den adjacent to the station. A direct footpath was built from the station to the North Stand (away section) of the ground, this is used on match days only.

== Accidents & Incidents ==
On 21 January 1947, an empty stock train was involved in a rear-end collision with an electric multiple unit.

== Services ==
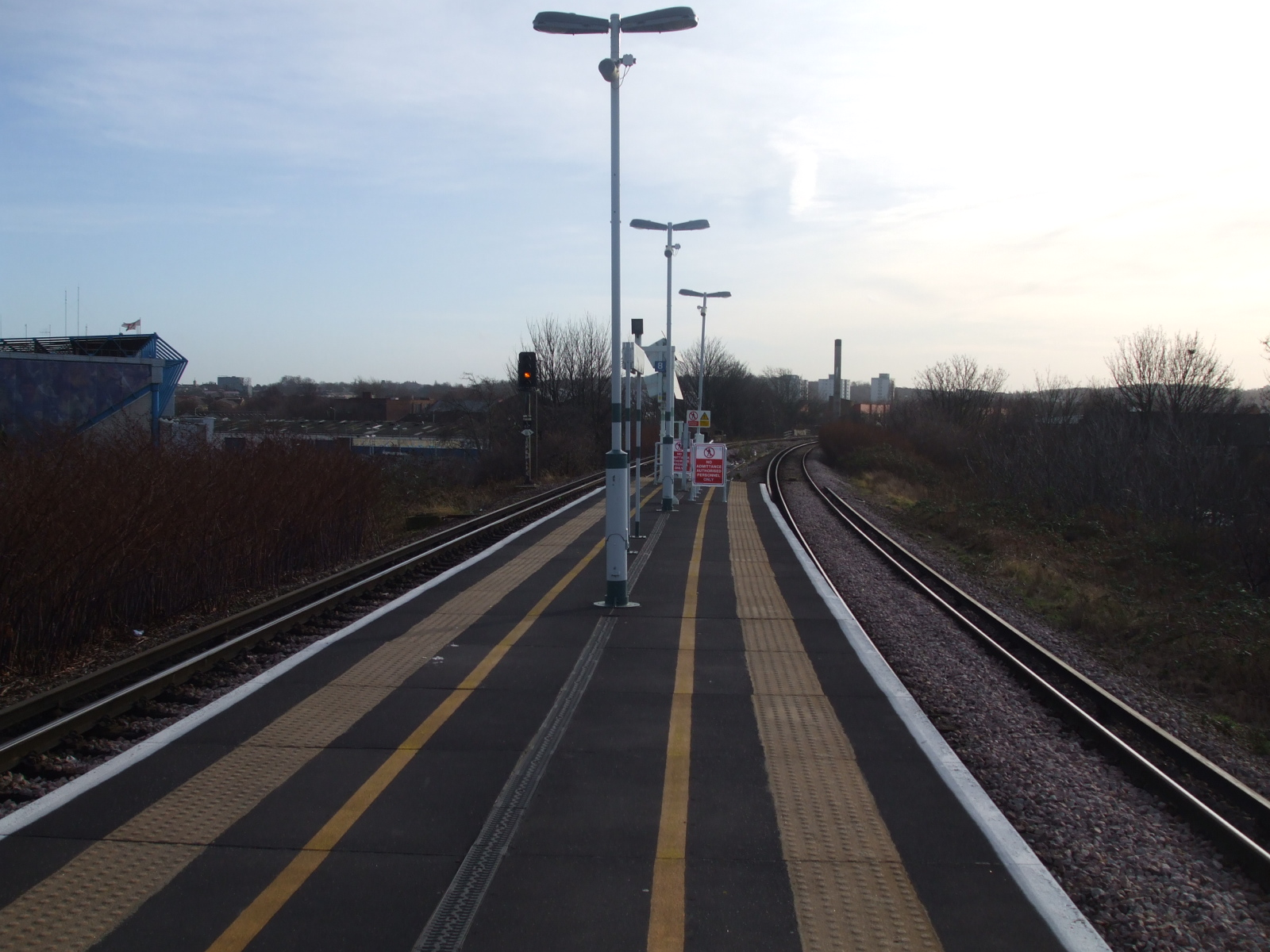
The island platform with The Den in the background

All services at South Bermondsey are operated by Southern using Class 377 EMUs.

The typical off-peak service in trains per hour is:

- 2 tph between London Bridge and East Croydon via Norbury
- 2 tph between London Bridge and Beckenham Junction via Crystal Palace

During the evenings (after approximately 20:00), the service between London Bridge and Beckenham Junction is reduced to hourly. This service does not run on Sundays.

Preceding station	National Rail	Following station
London Bridge	Southern South London Line	Queens Road Peckham

== Connections ==
London Buses routes 1, 381 and P12 serve the station.

The Quietway 1 cycle route passes the station entrance.
