= Joseph Cross (cartographer) =

English cartographer

Joseph Cross (27 October 1821 – 1865) was an English cartographer based in Holborn in the middle of the nineteenth century. He produced various maps of such locations as London and Australia.

Joseph was the son of Joseph Cross senior, who established a map publishing business at least since 1823 when he published A new map of the county of Monmouth.

== Maps on line ==
- 1839 Chart of part of New South Wales
