= The Athletic Grounds (Isle of Dogs) =

Former association football stadium in London

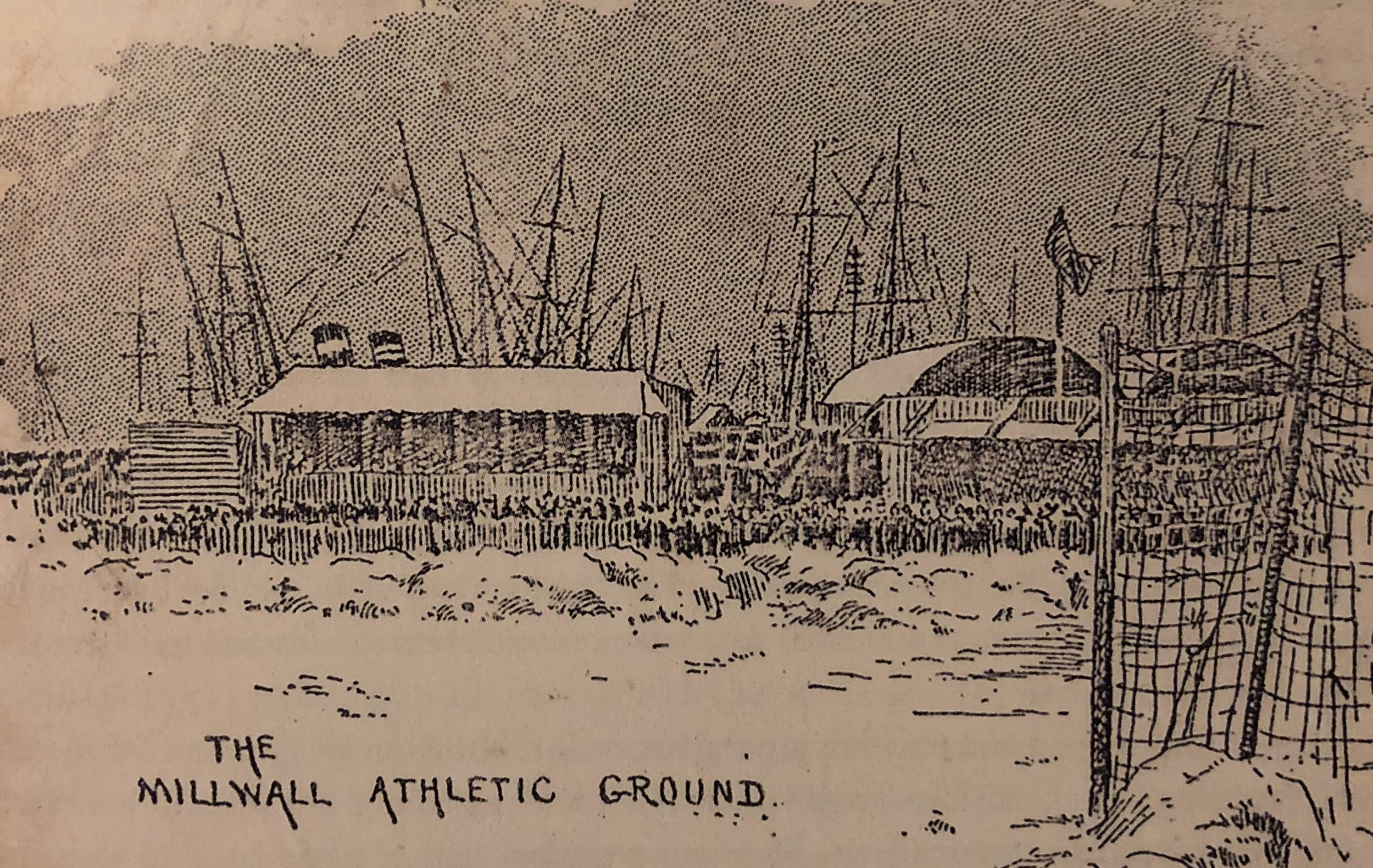
- 1894 illustration depicting a westward view across the snow-covered pitch
- Interactive map of The Athletic Grounds
- Location: East Ferry Road; Isle of Dogs, London, E14 3NY
- Coordinates: 51°29′40″N 0°0′48″W
- Capacity: 10,000–20,000 (standing)
- Surface: Grass

Construction
- Opened: 6 September 1890
- Closed: 27 April 1901

Tenant
- Millwall Athletic (1890–1901)

The Athletic Grounds was a football ground and the home of Millwall Athletic Football Club from 1890–1901, the team who went on to become Millwall. It was situated on the Isle of Dogs, East London. It was the third stadium Millwall had occupied since their formation as a football club in 1885. Millwall were formidable at the Athletic Grounds, winning 73% of their games. In total they played 147 games here in all competitions, winning 108, losing 24 and drawing 15.

== History ==
On 10 May 1890 Millwall Rovers played their last game at their second ground, the Lord Nelson Ground, a piece of land situated behind the Lord Nelson pub, against Royal Arsenal to help raise funds for a new ground. The game raised £113 9s. The money helped Millwall move into the Athletic Grounds. This was their first purpose-built ground, with a grandstand that seated 600 people and an overall capacity of between 10,000 and 15,000. The club dropped Rovers from their name, adopting Athletic to go with their new ground.

The new ground was situated on East Ferry Road, opposite the Millwall Docks station. The club obtained a 14-year lease from the Millwall Dock Company and it covered some 27 acres. The club was forced to move on 11 years into the lease, as the dock company wanted to use it as a timber yard. The last game at the Athletic Grounds was a 4–0 win over Bristol City on 27 April 1901 in the Western League. They relocated for the start of the 1901–1902 season to a location near their second home, which became known as North Greenwich.

They remained an east London club for a further nine years, with the last game played on the Isle of Dogs on 8 October 1910 against Portsmouth, which Millwall won 3–1. Due to lack of expansion space in the Millwall area of East London, Millwall moved to South London in 1910 and into their ground, The Den.

== Attendances ==
The record attendance at The Athletic Grounds of 20,000 was achieved twice in the FA Cup, in a 4–2 win against Woolwich Arsenal on 16 January 1897 in the Fifth qualifying round and a 1–1 draw with Aston Villa on 3 February 1900 in the Third round.
