= North Greenwich (football ground) =

Defunct London football stadium, home to Millwall F.C. (1901-1910)

- Former names: East Ferry Road
- Location: North Greenwich; Isle of Dogs; London, England
- Capacity: 16,300 (standing)
- Surface: Grass

Construction
- Built: July-September 1901
- Opened: 21 September 1901
- Closed: 15 October 1910

Tenant
- Millwall Athletic F.C. (1901–1910)

North Greenwich was a football ground and the home of Millwall Athletic Football Club from 1901–1910, the team who went on to become Millwall. It was situated on the Isle of Dogs, East London. It was the fourth stadium that Millwall have occupied since their formation as a football club in 1885, and their last East London ground before they moved to South London. Millwall played 249 games in all competitions at North Greenwich, winning 153, losing 46 and with 50 drawn.

== History ==
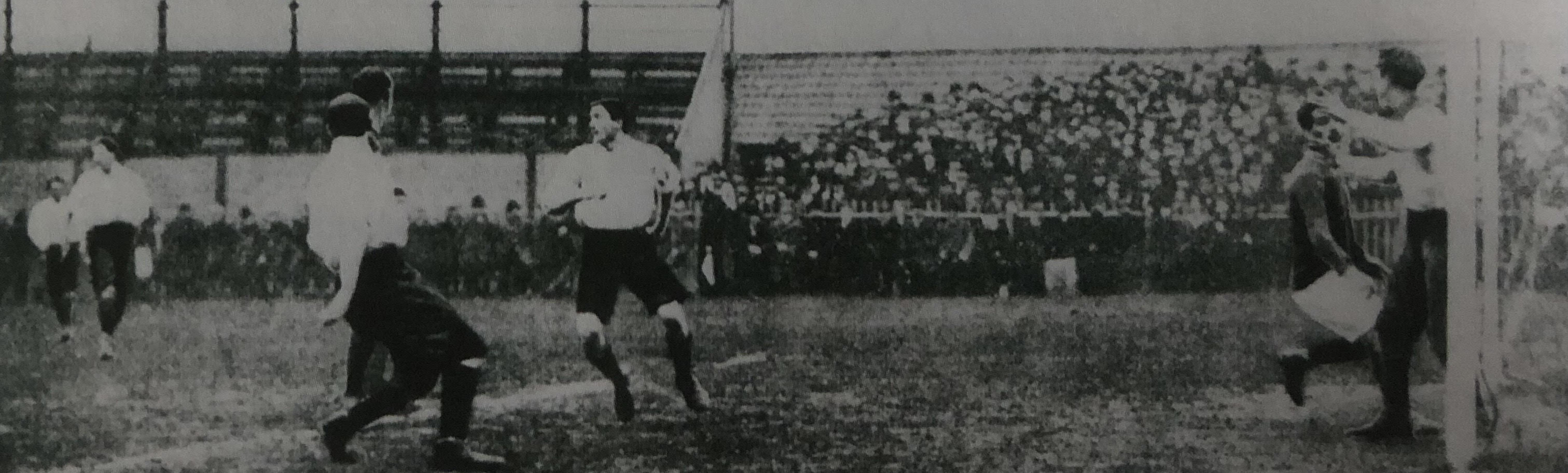
Millwall playing Preston in the 1902 FA Cup at North Greenwich.

Millwall Athletic were forced to leave their third ground, The Athletic Grounds after the Millwall Dock Company told them they wanted to use it as a timberyard. The last game at the Athletic Grounds was a 4–0 win over Bristol City on 27 April 1901 in the Western League. Millwall relocated for the start of the 1901–02 season to a location near their second home, which became known as North Greenwich, staying in the Metropolitan Borough of Poplar.

Their first game at North Greenwich was against Portsmouth on 21 September 1901, which they lost 3–2. The Game was watched by 6,000 people. The last ever first-team game played on the Isle of Dogs was on 10 October 1910 against Woolwich Arsenal in the London Challenge Cup. Millwall won the game 1–0 in front of a crowd of 3000.

Millwall Park now covers the land the ground used to stand on, and the railway viaduct forms part of the Docklands Light Railway. During the early 1900s supporters found it difficult to get on to the island to watch games, with severe congestion caused by increasing traffic in Millwall Docks. The Blackwall Tunnel opened in 1897 and the Greenwich Foot Tunnel in 1902 but due to lack of expansion space in the Millwall area of East London, Millwall moved to South London in 1910 and into their ground, The Den.

== Attendances ==
The record attendance at North Greenwich was 16,285 in the FA Cup, in a 1–0 win against Woolwich Arsenal on 10 February 1909 in a Second round replay.
