= Lord Nelson Ground =

Millwall F.C.'s second stadium from 1886–1890

Coordinates: 51.489°N 0.011°W

Lord Nelson
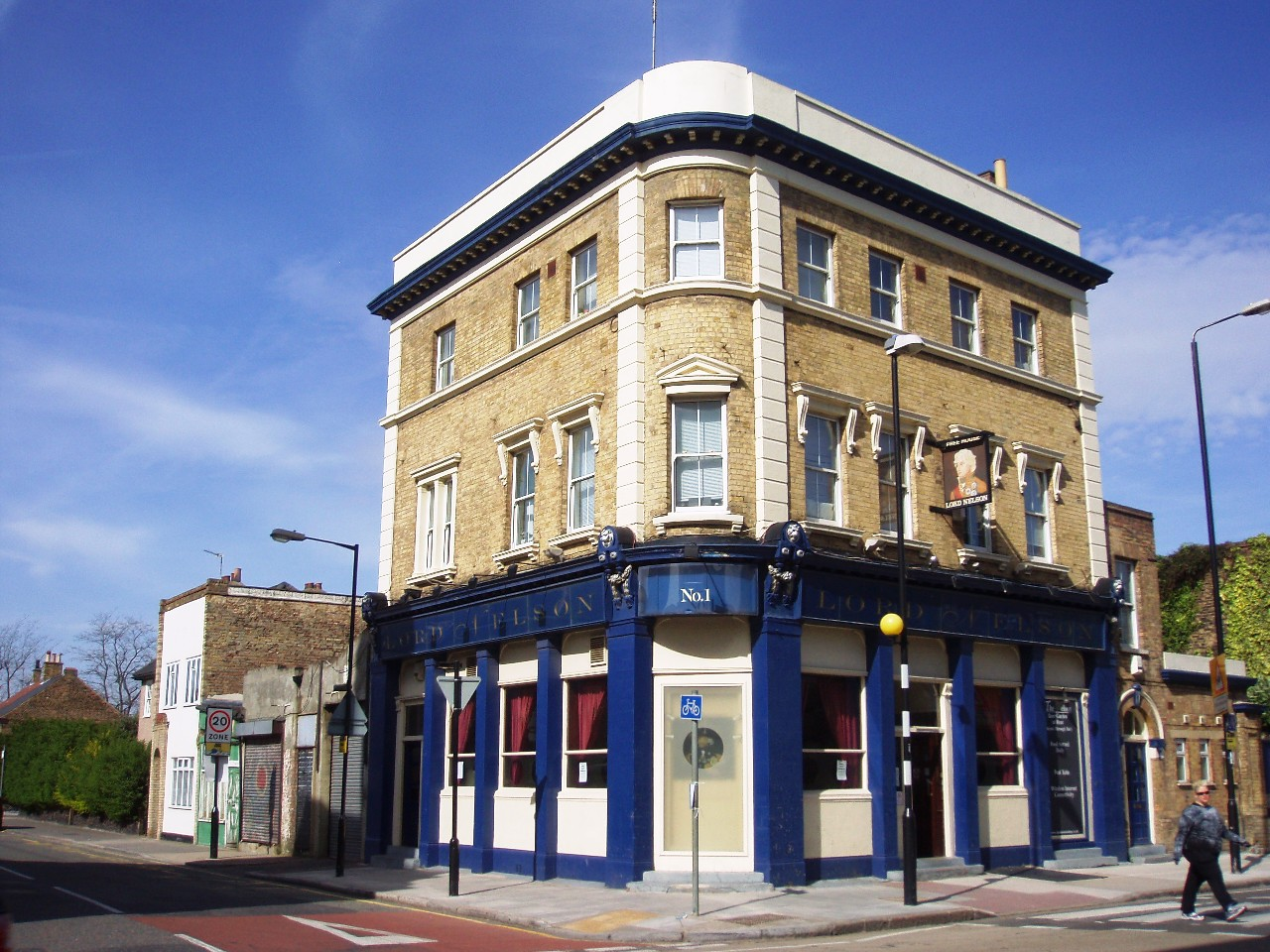
- The Lord Nelson pub (pictured in 2008) was used as a changing room during games.
- Interactive map of Lord Nelson
- Location: East Ferry Road; Cubitt Town; Isle of Dogs; London, England
- Capacity: 1,500 (standing)
- Surface: Grass

Construction
- Built: 1886
- Opened: 25 September 1886
- Closed: 10 May 1890

Tenant
- Millwall Rovers F.C. (1886–1890)

The Lord Nelson Ground was a football ground and the home of Millwall Rovers Football Club from 1886 to 1890, the team who went on to become Millwall. The ground was situated behind the Lord Nelson pub on East Ferry Road in Millwall on the Isle of Dogs in east London. It was the second stadium that Millwall have occupied since their formation as a football club in 1885. Millwall played a total of 101 games at this ground, winning 59, losing 30 and drawing 12.

== History ==
Millwall Rovers were playing on Glengall Road, and due to their success and the enthusiasm of its members decided to find a more suitable enclosure for games to be played on. Land was acquired on the southern tip of the Isle of Dogs and Lord Nelson became the clubs' new headquarters. With an enclosed ground, Millwall was finally able to charge an entry fee for fans and enter cup competitions. Millwall rented the land from a Mrs Lydia McMahon, and she received a better offer for it forcing Millwall to be evicted in 1890.

Their first game at the Lord Nelson Ground was a 4–1 win against Iona F.C. on 25 September 1886. The last game played there was 3–3 draw against Royal Arsenal on 10 May 1890. The game helped raise £113 9s in funds for The Athletic Grounds, Millwall's new stadium which they would move into in September 1890. Millwall Park now sits on the land where the Lord Nelson Ground once stood.
