= 1937–38 Colchester United F.C. season =

Colchester United
1937–38 season
- Chairman: Maurice Pye
- Manager: Ted Davis
- Stadium: Layer Road
- Southern League: 6th
- Southern League Mid-Week Section: 2nd
- Southern League Cup: Winners
- Top goalscorer: League: Alec Cheyne (19); All: Alec Cheyne (35)
- Highest home attendance: 11,000 (estimate) v Ipswich Town, 4 September 1937
- Lowest home attendance: 2,500 (estimate) v Norwich City Reserves, 16 September 1937
- Average home league attendance: 5,167
- Biggest win: 8–0 v Newport County Reserves, 30 April 1938
- Biggest defeat: 2–5 v Norwich City Reserves, 23 April 1938
Home colours

The 1937–38 season was Colchester United's first ever season after the formation as a professional club from amateur predecessors Colchester Town. Alongside competing in the Southern League, the club also participated in the Southern League Mid-Week Section and Southern League Cup. The club did not enter the FA Cup, but did win the Southern League Cup at the first attempt. Colchester finished 6th position in the league, and finished as runners-up to Millwall Reserves in the Mid-Week Section.

== Season overview ==
During a transitional period from the amateur organisation at Colchester Town to a professional club, twelve directors formed the board, appointing former Huddersfield Town goalkeeper and Bath City manager Ted Davis to take charge of team affairs. On 14 July 1937, the announcement was publicly made that the new club would be named Colchester United. A week after his appointment, Davis had already organised for the club to play in the same blue and white striped kit as his former club Huddersfield.

With trial matches taking place between 19 and 26 August 1937, Colchester United played their first ever professional match on 28 August 1937, travelling to The Huish to face Yeovil & Petters United. The game ended 3–0 to Yeovil, but Colchester made amends in their first game at Layer Road against Davis' old side Bath City on 2 September in the Mid-Week Section. The U's thrashed their counterparts 6–1, with Reg Smith registering the club's first hat-trick. Proficient bugle and cornet player Ronnie Dunn, Colchester's goalkeeper, welcomed the players of both sides to the pitch with a rendition of the post horn galop, a tradition which would remain throughout the club's years at Layer Road. The attendance was recorded as £250 instead of numbers of supporters, with the amount equating to an approximate attendance of 3,500. Two days later, an estimated 11,000 came to Layer Road to witness a 3–3 draw in the first meeting between Colchester United and nearby rivals Ipswich Town.

Reg Smith was sold to Wolverhampton Wanderers in October 1937 for £250, and with a deal agreed for Cliff Fairchild to join Arsenal at the end of the season for £500, Davis used his entrepreneurial skills to arrange for both First Division clubs to contest the Colchester Challenge Cup at Layer Road. The friendly fixture proved to be a success, with 17,584 seeing Wolves beat Arsenal 1–0.

Following an excellent beginning to Colchester United's existence spelt a swift demise for Colchester Town. With the Oysters suffering financial difficulty, the amateur club folded in 1937, having joined the six-club Essex Senior League. The club re-emerged briefly in January 1938 to complete an Essex Senior Cup tie in order to avoid a fine, but the withdrawal of Town meant that United could enter a reserve side into the Eastern Counties League one month later, with the reserve squad boosted by many of those previously on the books with Colchester Town.

Layer Road suffered severe damage to the roof in January 1938 during a severe gale, with a recently erected corrugated iron roof and timber structure damaging nearby buildings, causing the ground to be closed for two days to clear the debris.

The return match with Ipswich saw 8,000 Colchester fans set a new Portman Road ground record attendance of 23,890, with United wearing a new orange and black away strip. They had worn these kits a week earlier in a friendly against Charlton Athletic to acclimatise themselves to the new strip.

At the end of the season, Colchester finished mid-table, but did reach the Southern League Cup final. They lost the first leg 2–1 at Yeovil, but triumphed 3–1 at Layer Road to win 4–3 on aggregate and secure the club's first ever trophy. The club then adopted the nickname "The U's" to differentiate themselves from "The Oysters" of Colchester Town. Across the season, Colchester found the back of the net 155 times in all competitions, with Alec Cheyne scoring 35 goals, Arthur Pritchard 29 goals and Jack Hodge 24 goals helping the U's to that total. With professional football proving to be a success, the same applied for Colchester's neighbours and rivals Ipswich Town, who were elected to the Football League for the 1938–39 season.

== Players ==
As of match played 7 May 1938.

Name	Position	Nationality	Place of birth	Date of birth	Apps	Goals	Signed from	Date signed	Fee
Goalkeepers
Ronnie Dunn	GK	(England)	Southall	24 November 1908 (aged 28)	0	0	(England) Crystal Palace	3 July 1937	Free transfer
Don Youngs	GK	(England)			0	0	(England) Martlesham RAF	5 November 1937	Free transfer
Defenders
Jimmy Baker	CB/RH	(Wales)	Trethomas	5 May 1904 (aged 33)	0	0	(England) Bristol City	9 July 1937	Free transfer
Cliff Fairchild	RB	(England)	Great Yarmouth	23 October 1917 (aged 19)	0	0	(England) Northfleet United	28 August 1937 (Note: Date of signing refers to the date of the player's first game for the club)	Free transfer
Syd Fieldus	DF	(England)	Romford	27 May 1909 (aged 28)	0	0	(England) Brentford	3 July 1937	Free transfer
Ian Haley	RB	(England)	North Bierley		0	0	(England) Colchester Town	1 January 1938	Free transfer
George Leslie	CB	(England)	Slough	9 July 1907 (aged 29)	0	0	(England) Guildford City	9 July 1937	Free transfer
Alexander Wood	LB	(United States)	(Scotland) Lochgelly	12 June 1907 (aged 29)	0	0	(England) Nottingham Forest	16 July 1937	Free transfer
Midfielders
Jimmy Collins	LH/RH	(England)	Brentford	14 July 1903 (aged 33)	0	0	(England) West Ham United	3 July 1937	Free transfer
George Ritchie	LH	(Scotland)	Maryhill	16 January 1904 (aged 33)	0	0	(England) Leicester City	12 August 1937	Free transfer
George Smith	RH	(Wales)	Connah's Quay		0	0	(England) Bath City	27 October 1937	Free transfer
Forwards
Bill Barraclough	OL	(England)	Kingston upon Hull	3 January 1909 (aged 28)	0	0	(England) Chelsea	7 August 1937	Free transfer
Albert Bennett	CF				0	0	(England) Colchester Town	25 November 1937	Free transfer
Alec Cheyne	IH	(Scotland)	Glasgow	28 April 1907 (aged 30)	0	0	(England) Chelsea	13 August 1937	£3,000
George Crisp	WG	(Wales)	Pontypool	30 June 1911 (aged 25)	0	0	(Wales) Newport County	28 August 1937	Undisclosed
Jack Hodge	OR	(England)	Plymouth		0	0	(England) Luton Town	13 July 1937	Free transfer
Ken Mayes	IL/OL	(England)	Wickford	8 October 1910 (aged 26)	0	0	(England) Fulham	3 July 1937	£500
Bill Pendergast	CF/IL	(Wales)	Penygroes	13 April 1915 (aged 22)	0	0	(England) Bristol Rovers	9 December 1937	Free transfer
Arthur Pritchard	CF	(Wales)	Newport	22 October 1917 (aged 19)	0	0	(England) Yeovil & Petters United	28 August 1937	Free transfer
Ivan Thacker	CF	(England)	Lowestoft		0	0	(England) Lowestoft Town	18 February 1938	Free transfer
George Wallis	IF	(England)	Sawley		0	0	(England) Bath City	28 February 1938	Free transfer
George Williams	IR/CF				0	0	(England) Ipswich Town	17 July 1937	Free transfer

== Transfers ==
=== In ===
Date	Position	Nationality	Name	From	Fee	Ref.
Summer 1937	GK	(England)	Ted Platt	None	Free transfer	
23 June 1937	CF	(Scotland)	Reg Smith	(England) Bristol City	Free transfer	
3 July 1937	LH/RH	(England)	Jimmy Collins	(England) West Ham United	Free transfer	
3 July 1937	GK	(England)	Ronnie Dunn	(England) Crystal Palace	Free transfer	
3 July 1937	DF	(England)	Syd Fieldus	(England) Brentford	Free transfer	
3 July 1937	IL/OL	(England)	Ken Mayes	(England) Fulham	£500	
9 July 1937	CB/RH	(Wales)	Jimmy Baker	(England) Bristol City	Free transfer	
9 July 1937	CB	(England)	George Leslie	(England) Guildford City	Free transfer	
13 July 1937	OR	(England)	Jack Hodge	(England) Luton Town	Free transfer	
16 July 1937	LB	(United States)	Alexander Wood	(England) Nottingham Forest	Free transfer	
17 July 1937	IR/CF		George Williams	(England) Ipswich Town	Free transfer	
7 August 1937	OL	(England)	Bill Barraclough	(England) Chelsea	Free transfer	
12 August 1937	LH	(Scotland)	George Ritchie	(England) Leicester City	Free transfer	
13 August 1937	IH	(Scotland)	Alec Cheyne	(England) Chelsea	£3,000	
28 August 1937	RB	(England)	Cliff Fairchild	(England) Northfleet United	Free transfer	(Note: Date of signing refers to the date of the player's first game for the club)
28 August 1937	WG	(Wales)	George Crisp	(Wales) Newport County	Undisclosed	
28 August 1937	CF	(Wales)	Arthur Pritchard	(England) Yeovil & Petters United	Free transfer	
7 October 1937	DF	(England)	John Ormesher	(England) Colchester Town	Free transfer	
27 October 1937	RH	(Wales)	George Smith	(England) Bath City	Free transfer	
5 November 1937	GK	(England)	Don Youngs	(England) Martlesham RAF	Free transfer	
17 November 1937	CF	(England)	Tully Day	(England) Harwich & Parkeston	Free transfer	
25 November 1937	CF		Albert Bennett	(England) Colchester Town	Free transfer	
9 December 1937	CF/IL	(Wales)	Bill Pendergast	(England) Bristol Rovers	Free transfer	
1 January 1938	RB	(England)	Ian Haley	(England) Colchester Town	Free transfer	
18 February 1938	CF	(England)	Ivan Thacker	(England) Lowestoft Town	Free transfer	
28 February 1938	IF	(England)	George Wallis	(England) Bath City	Free transfer	
23 April 1938	OR	(England)	Sam Simnett	(England) Ipswich Town	Free transfer	

- Total spending: ▼ ~ £3,500

=== Out ===
Date	Position	Nationality	Name	From	Fee	Ref.
25 October 1937	CF	(Scotland)	Reg Smith	(England) Wolverhampton Wanderers	£500	
January 1938	DF	(England)	John Ormesher	Free agent	Released	
March 1938	GK	(England)	Ted Platt	(England) Arsenal	Free transfer	
19 April 1938	CF	(England)	Tully Day	(England) Harwich & Parkeston	Free transfer	(Note: Date of departure refers to the date of the player's final game for the club)
23 April 1938	OR	(England)	Sam Simnett	Free agent	Released	

- Total incoming: ▲ ~ £500

== Match details ==
=== Friendlies ===
27 September 1937 Friendly	Colchester United	0–4	Portsmouth	Colchester
		Report	Beattie 10', 65'; Smith 35', 90'	Stadium: Layer Road; Attendance: 3,500

14 October 1937 Friendly	Colchester United	3–1	Queens Park Rangers	Colchester
	Pritchard 16', 40'; Cheyne	Report	McCarthy 85'	Stadium: Layer Road; Attendance: 1,500

16 October 1937 Friendly	Colchester United	1–4	Chelsea Reserves	Colchester
15:15	Cheyne 12'	Report	Lewis 11', 57'; Sherbourne 33', 71'	Stadium: Layer Road; Attendance: 4,000; Referee: V. Asherwood

22 January 1938 Friendly	Colchester United	0–1	Charlton Athletic XI	Colchester
		Report	Barron 50'	Stadium: Layer Road; Attendance: 4,731

24 March 1938 Friendly	Colchester United	2–1	Crystal Palace	Colchester
	Williams 5', 65'	Report	Waldron	Stadium: Layer Road

=== Southern League ===
==== League table ====
Pos	Team	Pld	W	D	L	GF	GA	GR	Pts
4	Yeovil & Petters United	34	14	14	6	72	45	1.600	42
5	Norwich City II	34	15	11	8	77	55	1.400	41
6	Colchester United	34	15	8	11	90	58	1.552	38
7	Bristol Rovers II	34	14	8	12	63	62	1.016	36
8	Swindon Town II	34	14	7	13	70	76	0.921	35

Rules for classification: The system of using goal average to separate two teams tied on points was used up until the 1976-77 season. The points system: 2 points for a win, 1 point for a draw and 0 points for losing.

==== Matches ====
28 August 1937 1	Yeovil & Petters United	3–0	Colchester United	Yeovil
15:15	Halliday 30', 49', 70'	Report		Stadium: Huish Athletic Ground; Referee: E. Davis

4 September 1937 2	Colchester United	3–3	Ipswich Town	Colchester
	Crisp 41'; Wood 43'; Cheyne 75'	Report	Williams 2'; Alsop 15'; Perrett 80' (pen.)	Stadium: Layer Road; Attendance: 11,000

11 September 1937 3	Colchester United	0–0	Yeovil & Petters United	Colchester
15:15		Report		Stadium: Layer Road

18 September 1937 4	Colchester United	5–0	Guildford City	Colchester
15:15	Crisp 16'; R. Smith 37'; Pritchard 38', 53', 57'	Report		Stadium: Layer Road; Attendance: 5,000

25 September 1937 5	Aldershot Reserves	0–0	Colchester United	Aldershot
		Report		Stadium: Recreation Ground

29 September 1937 6	Torquay United Reserves	2–2	Colchester United	Torquay
15:30	Shelley 3', 53'	Report	Baker 18'; R. Smith 30'	Stadium: Plainmoor

9 October 1937 7	Plymouth Argyle Reserves	5–4	Colchester United	Plymouth
	Dougan 13'; McHarg 33', 38', 40', 75'	Report	Mitcheson 25' (o.g.); Cheyne 46'; Pritchard 90'; R. Smith	Stadium: Home Park; Attendance: 3,000

23 October 1937 8	Colchester United	3–2	Cheltenham Town	Colchester
15:15	Crisp 4'; Fieldus 75'; Ritchie 86'	Report	Ray 50'; Thornley 62'	Stadium: Layer Road; Attendance: 4,500

6 November 1937 9	Newport County Reserves	2–2	Colchester United	Newport
	Chadwick 75' (pen.); Owen 85'	Report	G. Smith 12'; Cheyne 65'; Barraclough (red card)	Stadium: Somerton Park

13 November 1937 10	Colchester United	2–2	Norwich City Reserves	Colchester
	Crisp 2'; G. Smith 47'	Report	Cassidy 43', 88'	Stadium: Layer Road; Attendance: 4,000

20 November 1937 11	Folkestone	2–4	Colchester United	Folkestone
	Cheesmur 25'; Caswell 44'	Report	Hodge 56', 75'; Cheyne; Fieldus	Stadium: Cheriton Road

27 November 1937 12	Colchester United	2–0	Aldershot Reserves	Colchester
14:35	Hodge 54'; Fieldus 78'	Report		Stadium: Layer Road

4 December 1937 13	Swindon Town Reserves	1–5	Colchester United	Swindon
	Emery	Report	Pritchard 10'; Hodge 60'	Stadium: County Ground; Attendance: 1,000

18 December 1937 14	Colchester United	7–1	Folkestone	Colchester
14:30	Hodge 8', 57'; Day 25', 54', 73'; Cheyne 27'; Pritchard 65'	Report	Jones 87'	Stadium: Layer Road; Attendance: 3,000

25 December 1937	Exeter City Reserves	P–P	Colchester United	Exeter
		Report		Stadium: St James Park

27 December 1937 15	Colchester United	3–1	Exeter City Reserves	Colchester
	Barraclough 18'; Day 53'; Cheyne 79'	Report	McGill 45'	Stadium: Layer Road; Attendance: 8,000

1 January 1938 16	Colchester United	6–1	Barry Town	Colchester
	Cheyne 6'; Hodge 19'; Pendergast 21', 42', 70'; Day 32'	Report	Carless 82'	Stadium: Layer Road

8 January 1938 17	Cheltenham Town	2–2	Colchester United	Cheltenham
14:30	Ray; Rushforth	Report	Pendergast 4'; Cheyne	Stadium: Whaddon Road; Referee: R. Griffin

15 January 1938 18	Colchester United	2–0	Dartford	Colchester
	Pritchard; Pendergast	Report		Stadium: Layer Road

5 February 1938 19	Ipswich Town	3–2	Colchester United	Ipswich
	Astill 44'; Perrett 85'; Little 89'	Report	Pritchard 27'; Cheyne 70'	Stadium: Portman Road; Attendance: 23,890

12 February 1938 20	Barry Town	2–1	Colchester United	Barry
	Dakin 5', 15'	Report	Cheyne	Stadium: Jenner Park Stadium

19 February 1938 21	Dartford	3–0	Colchester United	Dartford
	Smithson 65'; Catlin; Moseley	Report		Stadium: Watling Street

24 February 1938 22	Colchester United	3–1	Tunbridge Wells Rangers	Colchester
	Hodge 23'; Cheyne 77'; Barraclough 82'	Report	Kavanagh 85'	Stadium: Layer Road

26 February 1938 23	Colchester United	1–0	Bristol Rovers Reserves	Colchester
	Pritchard 13'	Report		Stadium: Layer Road; Attendance: 6,238

5 March 1938 24	Bristol Rovers Reserves	2–1	Colchester United	Bristol
	Charles; Sullivan	Report	Wallis 10'	Stadium: Eastville Stadium

26 March 1938 25	Colchester United	4–0	Torquay United Reserves	Colchester
	Wallis 46', 51', 73'; Cheyne 62'	Report		Stadium: Layer Road; Attendance: 5,312

2 April 1938 26	Guildford City	3–2	Colchester United	Guildford
	R. Brown 45'; Bytheway 80'; J. Brown 86'	Report	Cheyne 26'; Hodge 39'	Stadium: St Joseph's Road; Attendance: 4,000

9 April 1938 27	Exeter City Reserves	2–1	Colchester United	Exeter
	Farrell 40'; Pollard 83'	Report	Hodge 65'	Stadium: St James Park

15 April 1938 28	Bath City	2–3	Colchester United	Bath
15:15	Weale 27'; Davis	Report	Day 25', 70', 89'	Stadium: Twerton Park

16 April 1938 29	Colchester United	7–1	Swindon Town Reserves	Colchester
15:15	Crisp 30' (pen.), 39', 75' (pen.); Cheyne 39', 80'; Hodge; Day	Report	Hunt	Stadium: Layer Road; Attendance: 6,782

18 April 1938 30	Colchester United	1–1	Bath City	Colchester
15:15	Cheyne 40'	Report	Curtis 85'	Stadium: Layer Road; Attendance: 8,000

21 April 1938 31	Norwich City Reserves	5–2	Colchester United	Norwich
	Law 32', 37'; O'Reilly 35'; Morris 68'; Burley 82'	Report	Crisp 46'; Pritchard 89'	Stadium: Carrow Road; Attendance: 1,596

23 April 1938 32	Tunbridge Wells Rangers	3–0	Colchester United	Royal Tunbridge Wells
	Kavanagh 5', 40', 50'	Report		Stadium: Down Farm

30 April 1938 33	Colchester United	8–0	Newport County Reserves	Colchester
	Wallis 3'; Crisp 5'; Cheyne 9'; Pritchard 18', 65', 67', 78'; Hodge 88'	Report		Stadium: Layer Road

7 May 1938 34	Colchester United	2–3	Plymouth Argyle Reserves	Colchester
15:15	Cheyne 36', 38' (pen.)	Report	Connor 55', 58'; Dougan 61'	Stadium: Layer Road

=== Southern League Mid-Week Section ===
==== League table ====
Pos	Team	Pld	W	D	L	GF	GA	GR	Pts	Result
1	Millwall Reserves (C)	18	13	3	2	59	21	2.810	29	Southern League Midweek Section champions
2	Colchester United	18	13	1	4	42	23	1.826	27	
3	Aldershot Reserves	18	11	3	4	38	29	1.310	25	
4	Folkestone	18	7	6	5	32	36	0.889	20	
5	Norwich City Reserves	18	9	1	8	45	39	1.154	19	

Rules for classification: 1) Points; 2) Goal average; 3) Number of goals scored. The system of using goal average to separate two teams tied on points was used up until the 1976–77 season. The points system: 2 points for a win, 1 point for a draw and 0 points for losing.
(C) Champions

==== Matches ====
2 September 1937 1	Colchester United	6–1	Bath City	Colchester
	R. Smith 5', 13', 60'; Pritchard 25', 41'; Hodge 40'	Report	Brown 89'	Stadium: Layer Road

23 September 1937 2	Colchester United	1–0	Folkestone	Colchester
	Baker 35'	Report		Stadium: Layer Road

2 October 1937 3	Bath City	3–4	Colchester United	Bath
	Davis 44', 88'; Dransfield 80' (pen.)	Report	Pritchard 26'; Hodge 50', 57'; Crisp	Stadium: Twerton Park

7 October 1937 4	Colchester United	1–2	Tunbridge Wells Rangers	Colchester
	R. Smith 72'	Report	Finnan 13'; Langley	Stadium: Layer Road

20 October 1937 5	Portsmouth 'A'	3–4	Colchester United	Portsmouth
	Cook 12'; Price 30'; Beaumont 79'	Report	Pritchard 6'; Cheyne 11', 14'; R. Smith 70'	Stadium: Fratton Park

30 October 1937 6	Dartford	1–2	Colchester United	Dartford
	Moseley 89'	Report	Cheyne 15'; Pritchard 60'	Stadium: Watling Street

17 November 1937 7	Aldershot Reserves	3–1	Colchester United	Aldershot
	Simpson 1'; Court 49', 75'	Report	Crisp 78'	Stadium: Recreation Ground

25 November 1937 8	Norwich City Reserves	2–1	Colchester United	Norwich
	Burley 71'; Church 74'	Report	Barraclough 65'; Barraclough (red card)	Stadium: Carrow Road; Attendance: 1,518

11 December 1937 9	Colchester United	1–0	Aldershot Reserves	Colchester
	Cheyne 17'	Report		Stadium: Layer Road

29 January 1938 10	Colchester United	2–1	Portsmouth 'A'	Colchester
15:00	Cheyne 29'; Pendergast 40'	Report	Cunnington 25'	Stadium: Layer Road; Attendance: 4,632

31 January 1938 11	Millwall Reserves	2–0	Colchester United	Millwall
15:00	Osborne 30'; Walsh 60' (pen.)	Report		Stadium: The Den

3 March 1938 12	Colchester United	1–0	Dartford	Colchester
	Barraclough 89'	Report		Stadium: Layer Road

10 March 1938 13	Colchester United	5–0	Guildford City	Colchester
	Hodge 10'; Wallis 40'; Day 79'; Cheyne	Report		Stadium: Layer Road

12 March 1938 14	Folkestone	2–2	Colchester United	Folkestone
	Cheesmur 51'; Halls 87'	Report	Crisp 26'; Cheyne 67'	Stadium: Cheriton Road

19 March 1938 15	Colchester United	3–0	Norwich City Reserves	Colchester
15:15	Thacker 2'; Cheyne 12'; Hodge 72'	Report		Stadium: Layer Road; Attendance: 6,215

23 March 1938 16	Tunbridge Wells Rangers	0–1	Colchester United	Royal Tunbridge Wells
		Report	Hodge 25'	Stadium: Down Farm

2 May 1938 17	Guildford City	1–4	Colchester United	Guildford
	Atherton	Report	Crisp 20'; Pritchard 23', 28'; Hodge 43'	Stadium: St Joseph's Road

5 May 1938 18	Colchester United	3–2	Millwall Reserves	Colchester
	Wallis 5'; Cheyne 58'; Pritchard 61'	Report	Mangnall 5', 30'	Stadium: Layer Road

=== Southern League Cup ===
16 September 1937 1st round	Colchester United	7–3	Norwich City Reserves	Colchester
	Cheyne 22', 40'; R. Smith 27', 80'; Pritchard 35', 87'; Hodge 76'	Report	Reilly 18'; Fairchild 20' (o.g.); Church 71'	Stadium: Layer Road; Attendance: 2,500

16 December 1937 2nd round	Colchester United	2–0	Guildford City	Colchester
	Day 50'; Cheyne 83'	Report		Stadium: Layer Road

30 March 1938 Semi-final 1st leg	Dartford	0–2	Colchester United	Chelmsford
17:20		Report	Hodge 35'; Day 75'	Stadium: New Writtle Street; Attendance: 3,000

7 April 1938 Semi-final 2nd leg	Colchester United	8–1 (10–1 agg.)	Dartford	Colchester
	Hodge 4', 65'; Day 21', 30'; Cheyne 35', 50'; Crisp 70'	Report	Prout 20' (pen.)	Stadium: Layer Road

19 April 1938 Final 1st leg	Yeovil & Petters United	2–1	Colchester United	Yeovil
18:30	Attley 20'; Manns 40'	Report	Cheyne 84'	Stadium: Huish Athletic Ground; Attendance: 1,600

27 April 1938 Final 2nd leg	Colchester United	3–1 (4–3 agg.)	Yeovil & Petters United	Colchester
18:30	Cheyne 25'; Pritchard 35', 84'	Report	Appleby 68'	Stadium: Layer Road; Attendance: 7,500

== Squad statistics ==
=== Appearances and goals ===
No.	Pos	Nat	Player	Total		Southern League		Southern League Mid-Week Section		Southern League Cup	
No.	Pos	Nat	Player	Apps	Goals	Apps	Goals	Apps	Goals	Apps	Goals
	GK	(England) ENG	Ronnie Dunn	51	0	31	0	15	0	5	0
	GK	(England) ENG	Don Youngs	7	0	3	0	3	0	1	0
	DF	(Wales) WAL	Jimmy Baker	31	2	17	1	10	1	4	0
	DF	(England) ENG	Cliff Fairchild	52	0	30	0	16	0	6	0
	DF	(England) ENG	Syd Fieldus	21	3	13	3	4	0	4	0
	DF	(England) ENG	Ian Haley	9	0	5	0	4	0	0	0
	DF	(England) ENG	George Leslie	43	0	24	0	16	0	3	0
	DF	(United States) USA	Alexander Wood	54	1	32	1	16	0	6	0
	MF	(England) ENG	Jimmy Collins	3	0	3	0	0	0	0	0
	MF	(Scotland) SCO	George Ritchie	31	1	20	1	7	0	4	0
	MF	(Wales) WAL	George Smith	24	2	15	2	9	0	0	0
	FW	(England) ENG	Bill Barraclough	26	4	19	2	6	2	1	0
	FW		Albert Bennett	1	0	0	0	1	0	0	0
	FW	(Scotland) SCO	Alec Cheyne	54	35	32	19	16	9	6	7
	FW	(Wales) WAL	George Crisp	39	14	19	9	15	4	5	1
	FW	(England) ENG	Jack Hodge	51	24	30	12	15	7	6	5
	FW	(England) ENG	Ken Mayes	37	0	19	0	12	0	6	0
	FW	(Wales) WAL	Bill Pendergast	11	6	8	5	3	1	0	0
	FW	(Wales) WAL	Arthur Pritchard	37	29	22	17	11	8	4	4
	FW	(England) ENG	Ivan Thacker	4	1	2	0	2	1	0	0
	FW	(England) ENG	George Wallis	16	7	10	5	6	2	0	0
	FW		George Williams	4	0	3	0	1	0	0	0
Players who appeared for Colchester who left during the season
	DF	(England) ENG	John Ormesher	2	0	1	0	1	0	0	0
	FW	(England) ENG	Tully Day	15	15	7	9	4	2	4	4
	FW	(England) ENG	Sam Simnett	1	0	1	0	0	0	0	0
	FW	(England) ENG	Reg Smith	14	10	8	3	5	5	1	2

=== Goalscorers ===
Place	Nationality	Position	Name	Southern League	SL Mid-Week Section	Southern League Cup	Total
1	(Scotland)	IH	Alec Cheyne	19	9	7	35
2	(Wales)	CF	Arthur Pritchard	17	8	4	29
3	(England)	OR	Jack Hodge	12	7	5	24
4	(England)	CF	Tully Day	9	2	4	15
5	(Wales)	WG	George Crisp	9	4	1	14
6	(England)	CF	Reg Smith	3	5	2	10
7	(England)	IF	George Wallis	5	2	0	7
8	(Wales)	CF/IL	Bill Pendergast	5	1	0	6
9	(England)	OL	Bill Barraclough	2	2	0	4
10	(England)	DF	Syd Fieldus	3	0	0	3
11	(Wales)	CB/RH	Jimmy Baker	1	1	0	2
11	(Wales)	RH	George Smith	2	0	0	2
13	(Scotland)	LH	George Ritchie	1	0	0	1
13	(England)	CF	Ivan Thacker	0	1	0	1
13	(United States)	LB	Alexander Wood	1	0	0	1
			Own goals	1	0	0	1
			TOTALS	0	0	0	155

=== Disciplinary record ===
Nationality	Position	Name	Southern League		SL Mid-Week Section		Southern League Cup		Total	
Nationality	Position	Name	Booked	Sent off (straight red)	Booked	Sent off (straight red)	Booked	Sent off (straight red)	Booked	Sent off (straight red)
(England)	OL	Bill Barraclough	0	1	0	1	0	0	0	2
(Wales)	WG	George Crisp	0	0	0	0	1	0	1	0
		TOTALS	0	1	0	1	1	0	1	2

=== Captains ===
Number of games played as team captain.

Place	Nationality	Position	Player	Southern League	SL Mid-Week Section	Southern League Cup	Total
1	(Scotland)	LH	George Ritchie	17	7	4	28
2	(Wales)	CB/RH	Jimmy Baker	3	4	1	8
			Not recorded	14	7	1	22
			TOTALS	34	18	6	58

=== Clean sheets ===
Number of games goalkeepers kept a clean sheet.

Place	Nationality	Player	Southern League	SL Mid-Week Section	Southern League Cup	Total
1	(England)	Ronnie Dunn	7	4	2	13
2	(England)	Don Youngs	1	2	0	3
		TOTALS	8	6	2	16

=== Player debuts ===
Players making their first-team Colchester United debut in a fully competitive match.

Position	Nationality	Player	Date	Opponent	Ground	Notes
GK	(England)	Ronnie Dunn	28 August 1937	Yeovil & Petters United	Huish Athletic Ground	
LH/RH	(England)	Jimmy Collins	28 August 1937	Yeovil & Petters United	Huish Athletic Ground	
RB	(England)	Cliff Fairchild	28 August 1937	Yeovil & Petters United	Huish Athletic Ground	
CB	(England)	George Leslie	28 August 1937	Yeovil & Petters United	Huish Athletic Ground	
LH	(Scotland)	George Ritchie	28 August 1937	Yeovil & Petters United	Huish Athletic Ground	
LB	(United States)	Alexander Wood	28 August 1937	Yeovil & Petters United	Huish Athletic Ground	
IH	(Scotland)	Alec Cheyne	28 August 1937	Yeovil & Petters United	Huish Athletic Ground	
WG	(Wales)	George Crisp	28 August 1937	Yeovil & Petters United	Huish Athletic Ground	
OR	(England)	Jack Hodge	28 August 1937	Yeovil & Petters United	Huish Athletic Ground	
CF	(Wales)	Arthur Pritchard	28 August 1937	Yeovil & Petters United	Huish Athletic Ground	
CF	(England)	Reg Smith	28 August 1937	Yeovil & Petters United	Huish Athletic Ground	
IL/OL	(England)	Ken Mayes	2 September 1937	Bath City	Layer Road	
OL	(England)	Bill Barraclough	11 September 1937	Yeovil & Petters United	Layer Road	
CB/RH	(Wales)	Jimmy Baker	23 September 1937	Folkestone	Layer Road	
DF	(England)	John Ormesher	7 October 1937	Tunbridge Wells Rangers	Layer Road	
DF	(England)	Syd Fieldus	9 October 1937	Plymouth Argyle Reserves	Home Park	
RH	(Wales)	George Smith	30 October 1937	Dartford	Watling Street	
CF	(England)	Albert "Tully" Day	17 November 1937	Aldershot Reserves	Recreation Ground	
CF		Albert Bennett	25 November 1937	Norwich City Reserves	Carrow Road	
CF/IL	(Wales)	Bill Pendergast	11 December 1937	Aldershot Reserves	Layer Road	
RB	(England)	Ian Haley	1 January 1938	Barry Town	Layer Road	
IR/CF		George Williams	31 January 1938	Millwall Reserves	The Den	
GK	(England)	Don Youngs	24 February 1938	Tunbridge Wells Rangers	Layer Road	
CF	(England)	Ivan Thacker	3 March 1938	Dartford	Layer Road	
IF	(England)	George Wallis	3 March 1938	Dartford	Layer Road	
OR	(England)	Sam Simnett	23 April 1938	Tunbridge Wells Rangers	Down Farm	

== See also ==
- List of Colchester United F.C. seasons
