= Cliff Fairchild =

English footballer

Personal information
- Full name: Clifford Charles Fairchild
- Date of birth: 23 October 1917
- Place of birth: Romford, England
- Date of death: 1974 (aged 56–57)
- Place of death: Great Yarmouth, England
- Height: 5 ft 11 1/2 in (1.82 m)
- Position: Full-back

Senior career*
Years	Team	Apps	(Gls)
- Barking
1936–1937	Northfleet United		
1937–1938	Colchester United	30	(0)
1938–1939	Arsenal	0	(0)
1939–1946	Southend United	2	(0)
- Great Yarmouth Town
- Lowestoft Town
Total		32	(0)

Managerial career
- Great Yarmouth Town (player-coach)
- * Club domestic league appearances and goals

Clifford Charles Fairchild (23 October 1917 – 1974) was an English professional footballer who played as a full-back in the Football League for Southend United. He was also on the books at Arsenal, but failed to break into the first-team.

== Career ==
Born in Romford, Fairchild embarked on his footballing career with Barking, and by his 19th birthday, he was registered as a professional with Tottenham Hotspur's nursery side Northfleet United. He trialled for newly formed Southern League side Colchester United during the summer of 1937 in a "probables versus possibles" pre-season game, impressing Colchester manager Ted Davis. He signed on for the club's first professional season, making his debut in their first-ever game, a 3–0 defeat to Yeovil & Petters United at The Huish on 28 August 1937.

Having become a regular in Davis' first-team, Arsenal manager George Allison was sufficiently impressed to sign him from Colchester for a £500 fee, in addition to the Arsenal first-team taking part in the Colchester Challenge Cup against Wolverhampton Wanderers at Layer Road - a match between two First Division sides that drew a then-record crowd of 17,854 to Layer Road. Also heading to Arsenal under the same deal was young goalkeeper Ted Platt. However, the deal, which was agreed in March 1938, allowed Fairchild to remain with Colchester until the end of the 1937–38 season.

Remaining with Colchester allowed Fairchild to help his side to lift the Southern League Cup after beating Yeovil 4–3 on aggregate over two legs. He played his final game for the U's on 30 April 1938 as Colchester thrashed Newport County Reserves 8–0 at home.

Fairchild joined Arsenal for the 1938–39 season, but was restricted only to appearances for the Arsenal Colts side. He revisited Layer Road with the reserves in the Southern League and Cup, but failed to make a first-team appearance for the Gunners. He was released at the end of the season.

Third Division South side Southend United signed Fairchild for the 1939–40 season, where he made two appearances in the Football League before the league was disbanded due to the outbreak of World War II. He played a selection of wartime friendlies for Southend.

After the war, Fairchild became player-coach at Great Yarmouth Town in August 1946, and in the early 1950s continued his playing career with Lowestoft Town, regularly featuring for the reserve side and occasionally called upon for first-team duties until the 1955–56 season.

== Honours ==
Colchester United

- 1938 Southern League Cup winner
