= Jimmy Collins (footballer, born 1903) =

English footballer

- Collins with West Ham United

Personal information
- Full name: James Frederick Arthur Collins
- Date of birth: 28 September 1903
- Place of birth: Brentford, England
- Date of death: May 1977 (aged 73–74)
- Place of death: Epping, Essex
- Height: 5 ft 11 in (1.80 m)
- Position: Wing half

Youth career
- East Ham Boys

Senior career*
Years	Team	Apps	(Gls)
- Chelmsford
- Clapton
–1921	Leyton		
1921–1936	West Ham United	311	(3)
1937–1938	Colchester United	3	(0)
Total		314	(3)
- * Club domestic league appearances and goals

James Frederick Arthur Collins (28 September 1903 – May 1977) was an English professional footballer who played as a wing half in the Football League for West Ham United.

== Career ==
Born in Brentford, Collins, who was nicknamed "Lottie" after a music hall artiste of the era, played for East Ham Boys, with whom he made his first appearance at Upton Park as captain in 1917. He was called up to represent England Schools, but missed out on a cap after the game, against Scotland, was cancelled.

Playing as a forward, Collins featured for Chelmsford, Clapton and Leyton before signing amateur forms with West Ham United in 1921. He made his professional debut in the Football League on 9 February 1924 against Tottenham Hotspur.

Finding opportunities upfront limited, he switched to wing-half to gain regular football. He managed to play 160 consecutive games for West Ham, before a cartilage injury ended his run.

Following West Ham's relegation from the First Division to the Second Division, Collins was one of the few professional players to be retained, appearing in the FA Cup semi-final defeat to Everton the following season.

Having made 336 appearances for West Ham, including 311 in the league, scoring three goals, Collins proved instrumental in the club's pursuit of the London Combination title with the Reserves as they pipped Arsenal to the title.

After retiring from football in 1936, Collins made a return with newly formed Southern League club Colchester United in 1937. He made his debut in Colchester's first-ever match on 28 August 1937, when they were defeated 3–0 by Yeovil & Petters United at The Huish. However, he became the first player to be dropped by manager Ted Davis. His next appearance proved to be coincidental, as he travelled to Bath to cheer his teammates on, only to be called upon when Syd Fieldus missed his train. He made his third and final appearance on 23 April 1938, in a lineup that had nine changes made to it in Colchester's sixth game in only nine days. The match ended in a 3–0 defeat to Tunbridge Wells Rangers, and he was released by the club at the end of the 1937–38 season.

== Personal life ==
Collins owned and trained greyhounds for racing, with his 'Golden Hammer' finishing second in the 1931 English Greyhound Derby at White City Stadium. His brother, Ted, was an amateur international footballer who played for West Ham, Leyton and Walthamstow Avenue.
