= Yeovil Town 2–1 Sunderland (1949) =

- Event: 1948–49 FA Cup fourth round
Yeovil Town	Sunderland
2	1
- Date: 29 January 1949
- Venue: Huish Athletic Ground, Yeovil
- Attendance: 17,123

Yeovil Town v Sunderland was a football match played on 29 January 1949 at the Huish Athletic Ground, Yeovil. The match was a tie in the fourth round of the FA Cup. Yeovil Town won the match 2–1, with Alec Stock and Eric Bryant scoring the goals for the winning side. The match is notable for being one of the few occasions in the history of the FA Cup where a non-league club has defeated a team in the top tier of English football.

== Background ==
Yeovil Town was a non-league team competing in the Southern League during the 1948–49 season. The club entered the FA Cup at the Fourth qualifying round, and were drawn against Lovells Athletic. Yeovil were losing 2–0 at half time, but following an own goal from a Lovells defender in the second half, Yeovil went on to win the match 3–2. The team won more convincingly in the next two rounds, winning 4–0 against Romford and then beating Weymouth by the same scoreline. Yeovil were then drawn against Bury, who at the time were situated near the top of the Second Division. Yeovil won the match 3–1, progressing to the fourth round for the first time in their history.

Sunderland was a First Division side who had become known as the "Bank of England club" due to the large amounts of money the club had spent, including the signing of Len Shackleton for £20,500, a then-British record transfer fee. Sunderland entered the FA Cup in the third round, defeating Crewe Alexandra 2–0.

== Match summary ==
In the build-up to the game, Yeovil player-manager Alec Stock attempted to give his players a psychological edge over their opponents. He exaggerated the steepness of the sloping pitch at Huish, and refused to allow the Sunderland players to train on the pitch. The official attendance for the match was 17,123, although it is believed that many spectators without a ticket also made it into the ground, and it is estimated that somewhere between 18,000 and 19,000 watched the game.

The morning before the match, Yeovil's first choice goalkeeper Stan Hall was forced to drop out of the side due to a shoulder injury. He was replaced by Dickie Dyke, who had made only one first team appearance for the club. Sunderland made two changes to the side that defeated Derby County in the league the week before, with captain Fred Hall returning to the lineup at the expense of Ken Oliver, while Barney Ramsden filled in for the injured Arthur Hudgell in defence.

Yeovil started the match strongly, with Sunderland struggling to cope with the home side. After coming close to scoring on a couple of occasions, Yeovil then took the lead in the 28th minute. Sunderland failed to defend a lobbed free kick, and the ball was played to Alec Stock on the edge of the penalty area, who turned quickly before shooting towards the right hand side of the goal beyond the reach of Sunderland goalkeeper Johnny Mapson. Sunderland began to create a few chances of their own, but a string of fine saves from backup goalkeeper Dickie Dyke maintained Yeovil's 1–0 lead as the first half came to a close.

With just over a quarter-hour gone in the second half, Sunderland got their equaliser. A long ball into the penalty area was misjudged by Dyke – his one mistake in the match – allowing Jackie Robinson to score a simple tap in. With neither side able to find a winning goal, the score remained 1–1 after the full 90 minutes were played.

Instead of going straight to a replay, both teams agreed to play extra time, which was allowed under the rules of the competition at the time.

As extra time began, a dense cloud of fog descended onto the pitch, almost forcing the match to be abandoned. Towards the end of the first period of extra time, a mishit pass from Len Shackleton fell to Ray Wright, playing Eric Bryant through on goal, who found the net to put Yeovil back into the lead. With 15 minutes remaining to hold onto their lead, Yeovil were now on the back foot, with the superior fitness of Sunderland's professional players beginning to tell. Three minutes from time, the referee blew for a free kick to Sunderland. The Yeovil supporters, thinking the whistle had been blown for full-time, prematurely invaded the pitch in celebration, threatening to abandon the game once more. Order was eventually restored, allowing the final minutes of the game to be played.

== Match details ==
29 January 1949

Yeovil Town	2–1 (a.e.t.)	Sunderland
Stock 28'; Bryant 105'		Robinson 62'

Huish Athletic Ground, Yeovil
Attendance: 17,123

YEOVIL TOWN:
GK	1	(England) Dickie Dyke
DF	2	(England) Arthur Hickman
DF	3	(England) Ralph Davis
MF	4	(England) Bob Keeton
MF	5	(England) Les Blizzard
MF	6	(England) Nick Collins
FW	7	(Scotland) Bobby Hamilton
FW	8	(England) Alec Stock (c)
FW	9	(England) Eric Bryant
FW	10	(England) Ray Wright
FW	11	(England) Jack Hargreaves
Player/Manager:
(England) Alec Stock

SUNDERLAND:
GK	1	(England) Johnny Mapson
DF	2	(England) Jack Stelling
DF	3	(England) Barney Ramsden
MF	4	(England) Willie Watson
MF	5	(England) Fred Hall (c)
MF	6	(England) Arthur Wright
FW	7	(England) Len Duns
FW	8	(England) Jackie Robinson
FW	9	(England) Ronnie Turnbull
FW	10	(England) Len Shackleton
FW	11	(England) Tommy Reynolds
Manager:
(Scotland) Bill Murray

MATCH RULES

- 90 minutes
- 30 minutes of extra-time if necessary

== Aftermath ==
The match is frequently cited as one of the FA Cup's greatest ever upsets. In 2009, Yeovil attempted to commemorate the 60th anniversary of the game with an exhibition match between former players of Yeovil Town and Sunderland, but the game was called off due to a waterlogged pitch.

Yeovil were drawn against Manchester United in the fifth round, losing 8–0 at Maine Road in front of a crowd of over 80,000 people. However, the club went on to earn a reputation for frequently causing upsets in the FA Cup. Before their promotion to the Football League in 2003, Yeovil had defeated League opposition in the FA Cup on 20 different occasions – more times than any other non-league club.
