= George Leslie (footballer) =

English footballer

Personal information
- Full name: George William John Leslie
- Date of birth: 9 July 1907
- Place of birth: Slough, England
- Date of death: 22 November 1986 (aged 79)
- Place of death: Colchester, England
- Height: 6 ft 1 in (1.85 m)
- Position: Centre-half

Senior career*
Years	Team	Apps	(Gls)
- Slough Town
1930–?	Charlton Athletic	0	(0)
- Red Star Olympique
1932–1936	Walsall	88	(2)
1936–1937	Guildford City		
1937–1939	Colchester United	65	(0)
Total		153	(2)
- * Club domestic league appearances and goals

George William John Leslie (9 July 1907 – 22 November 1986) was an English professional footballer who played as a centre-half in the Football League for Walsall. Leslie was also on the books at Charlton Athletic but failed to make a first-team appearance. He additionally featured for Slough Town, Red Star Olympique in Paris, France, Guildford City and Colchester United.

== Career ==
Born in Slough, Leslie began his career with Slough Town before making a move to Charlton Athletic in 1930. He failed to break into the first-team, instead opting to move to France to ply his trade, featuring for Paris-based Red Star Olympique. He returned to England in 1932, joining up with Football League club Walsall. With Walsall, Leslie featured in an FA Cup giant killing when his Third Division North side defeated First Division Arsenal 2–0 in the third round of the 1932–33 competition.

Leslie would go on to make 88 Football League appearances for Walsall, scoring twice before drifting back into non-league football with Guildford City. Colchester United manager Ted Davis signed him from Guildford for the newly formed Southern League club in the summer of 1937. Leslie made his debut for the U's in their first-ever professional match on 28 August 1937 as Colchester fell to a 3–0 defeat to Yeovil & Petters United at the Huish. Leslie suffered from a string of injury problems while with Colchester as he was required to undergo a cartilage operation in May 1938, and suffered further setbacks in October 1938, requiring further fitness training at Highbury, London. On his return to first-team action, Leslie was named club captain, having been voted as the best centre-half in the Southern League for the 1937–38 campaign. He was just behind Jack Hodge in becoming the first player for the club to reach 100 first-team appearances. Leslie ended his time with Colchester during the 1939–40 season, when the league was abandoned due to the onset of World War II. He made his final appearance in a 0–0 draw against Ipswich Town Reserves on 2 September 1939, bringing his total appearances to 102 in all competitions.

Following the war, Leslie assisted fellow former Colchester United player Cecil Allan in running the Colchester Casuals amateur side from 1940 to 1949.

== Death ==
Leslie died in Colchester at the age of 79 on 22 November 1986.

== Honours ==
Colchester United

- 1937–38 Southern League Cup winner
- 1937–38 Southern Football League Mid-Week section runner-up
- 1938–39 Southern Football League winner
- 1938–39 Southern Football League Mid-Week section runner-up

All honours referenced by:

Sporting positions
Preceded by George Ritchie	Colchester United captain 1938–1939	Succeeded by Jimmy Jenkins
