= Abraham Smith =

Abraham Smith may refer to:

- A. Herr Smith (1815–1894), Republican member of the U.S. House of Representatives from Pennsylvania
- A. Hyatt Smith (1814–1892), American politician
- Abraham Smith (footballer) (1910–1974), footballer for Portsmouth and Mansfield Town
- Abraham Smith (politician), American politician, member of the Georgia House of Representatives
- Abe Smith in African Rally Championship

== See also ==
- Abram Smith (disambiguation)
