= Frederick Hall =

Frederick or Fred Hall may refer to:

- Frederick Hall (actor) (1923–1995), British actor
- Frederick Hall (painter) (1860–1948), English impressionist painter
- Frederick Hall (Normanton MP) (1855–1933), British Labour Member of Parliament 1905–1933
- Sir Frederick Hall, 1st Baronet (1864–1932), British Conservative Member of Parliament for Dulwich 1910–1932
- Frederick William Hall (1885–1915), Canadian recipient of the Victoria Cross
- Frederick William Hall (academic) (1868–1933), President of St John's College, Oxford
- Frederick W. Hall (Canadian magistrate) (d. 1977), Canadian reeve and magistrate
- Frederick Wilson Hall (1908–1984), New Jersey Supreme Court judge
- Frederic Aldin Hall (1854–1925), chancellor of Washington University in St. Louis
- Fred Hall (1916–1970), governor of Kansas 1955–1957
- Fred Hall (footballer, born 1917) (1917–1989), English footballer for Sunderland
- Fred Hall (footballer, born 1924) (1924–2006), English footballer for Birmingham City, later president of Huntingdonshire County FA
- Fred Hall (musician) (1898–1954), American pianist and bandleader
- Freddy Hall (1985–2022), Bermudian footballer
- Pastor Frederick Hall, fictional character from 1940 British film Pastor Hall
- William Williams (died 1815), American soldier, born Frederick Hall
