= Bill Barraclough =

English footballer

Personal information
- Full name: William Barraclough
- Date of birth: 3 January 1909
- Place of birth: Hull, England
- Date of death: 6 August 1969 (aged 60)
- Place of death: Hull, England
- Height: 5 ft 7 in (1.70 m)
- Position: Outside left

Senior career*
Years	Team	Apps	(Gls)
- Bridlington Town
1925–1928	Hull City	9	(0)
1928–1934	Wolverhampton Wanderers	172	(18)
1934–1937	Chelsea	74	(8)
1937–1938	Colchester United	19	(2)
1938-1939	Doncaster Rovers		
1945-1946	Peterborough United		
1940–1941	Hull City (guest)		
Total		274	(28)
- * Club domestic league appearances and goals

William Barraclough (3 January 1909 – 6 August 1969) was an English footballer who played as an outside left in the Football League for Hull City, Wolverhampton Wanderers, Chelsea and Doncaster Rovers. He also represented Colchester United in their first-ever season and Peterborough United.

== Career ==
Born in Hull, Barraclough began his career at Bridlington Town before signing for hometown club Hull City at the age of 16. He made nine Football League appearances while at Boothferry Park, and he had done enough to convince Wolverhampton Wanderers to sign him in 1928.

Barraclough made his Wolves debut on 15 December 1928 in a 3–2 win against Clapham Orient but could only manage three appearances during the 1928–29 season. However, he was a virtual ever-present when Wolves won the Second Division championship in the 1931–32 season, scoring seven times. The wide-man remained a first choice player as the club consolidated in the top flight over the next two seasons before leaving to join Chelsea in October 1934.

Following his Chelsea debut on 3 November 1934, Barraclough became an unpopular figure with the West London faithful, with his intricate ball skills occasionally being displayed at the cost of directness, often finding himself being barracked by some members of the crowd. Despite this, he made 74 league appearances in two and a half years at Stamford Bridge, scoring eight times, additionally notching three goals in seven FA Cup outings.

With a £2,500 price tag, Barraclough moved to newly formed Southern League club Colchester United for their inaugural season in 1937, making his debut in a 0–0 draw with Yeovil & Petters United on 11 September 1937 at Layer Road. However, Barraclough will go down in history as the first-ever Colchester player to be sent off when he received his marching orders on 25 November 1937 in a 2–1 defeat to Norwich City Reserves for persistently questioning the referee. United manager Ted Davis said of the incident that "Barraclough suffered a grave injustice in being ordered off for what was a trivial offence." Such was the gravity of the situation that the Football Association saw fit to warn Barraclough as to his future conduct. He made 19 league appearances and scored two goals for Colchester before being released by Davis at the end of the season.

After his release from Colchester, Barraclough joined Doncaster Rovers for a then-record £500 fee, a sum that went to Chelsea as they still held his league registration. He was involved in further misdemeanours at Doncaster in a game against Scunthorpe United, but the FA took no further action owing to his improvement in character. He later played for Peterborough United and made a return to Hull City during the war years as a guest player during the 1940–41 season, scoring two goals in 19 games.

== Later life ==
During the war, Barraclough was based in both Hull and Colchester, serving with the RADC in the latter. He returned to Hull to work as a clerk at the Port of Hull and later worked as a fruit merchant before his death on 6 August 1969.

== Honours ==
Wolverhampton Wanderers

- 1931–32 Football League Second Division winner (level 2)

All honours referenced by:
