= Jack Hodge =

English footballer

Personal information
- Full name: John Hodge
- Date of birth: 1906
- Place of birth: Plymouth, England
- Date of death: March 1996 (aged 90)
- Place of death: Plymouth, England
- Height: 5 ft 8 in (1.73 m)
- Position: Outside right

Senior career*
Years	Team	Apps	(Gls)
- Truro City
- Green Waves
- Halls Engineers
- Pearn Bros
- St Austell
1933–1934	Plymouth Argyle	0	(0)
1934–1935	Bristol City	62	(8)
1935–1937	Luton Town	20	(1)
1937–1939	Colchester United	72	(26)
1939	Hereford United		
- Devonport Dockyard
- Royal Naval Torpedo Depot
- Plymouth City
- Plymouth United
1945–1946	Plymouth Argyle (guest)		
- Torquay United (guest)
Total		154	(35)
- * Club domestic league appearances and goals

John Hodge (1906 – March 1996) was an English professional footballer who played as an outside right in the Football League for Bristol City and Luton Town. He played in his hometown of Plymouth for a number of local amateur clubs, joining Plymouth Argyle briefly but failing to make any first-team appearances. He also represented Southern League club Colchester United, featuring in their first-ever match.

== Career ==
Born in Plymouth, Devon, Hodge began his footballing career as an outside-right for local amateur sides, including Truro City, Greenwaves, Halls Engineers, Pearn Bros and St Austell prior to signing for his hometown Football League club Plymouth Argyle. Joining for the 1933–34 season, Hodge failed to make a first-team appearance for the Second Division outfit, as he moved to Bristol City for the 1934–35 season.

Hodge's move to Bristol City saw him rack up eight goals in 62 Third Division South appearances. During his stint with the Robins, he scored in an FA Cup giant killing, when City defeated First Division Portsmouth 2–0 in a fourth round replay match held on 30 January 1935. Hodge scored in the 86th minute to secure the victory.

An £800 bid from Luton Town saw Hodge move to Kenilworth Road in 1935, and despite a large offer from Arsenal in the same year, Hodge remained with the Hatters. He proved instrumental in Luton's 1936–37 title win, providing numerous assists for Joe Payne. At the end of the season, further offers followed from Newcastle United and Crystal Palace. Luton rejected these advances, despite the player refusing to re-sign for the club. Manager of the newly formed Colchester United, Ted Davis, stepped in to sign the player after a deal to move to Newcastle hit a snag.

Hodge made his Colchester United debut in their first-ever professional match as they fell to a 3–0 defeat to Yeovil & Petters United at the Huish on 28 August 1937. He scored the first of his 41 goals for the club in a Southern League Mid-Week section match against Bath City just five days later as Colchester triumphed 6–1 at Layer Road, their first recorded victory. Alongside his 41 goals in all competitions, Hodge made 112 appearances for the U's, and became the first player to reach 100 appearances for the club. While with Colchester, Hodge earned more silverware, winning the Southern League Cup in 1938 and winning the Southern League title in 1939.

After taking a dislike to Colchester's training regime, Hodge was released at the end of the 1938–39 season, opting to move to Hereford United. When the Second World War was declared in September 1939, he returned to Plymouth to work at Devonport Dockyard, representing the Dockyard team. He also represented to Royal Naval Torpedo Depot, Plymouth City and Plymouth United. He finally had his chance to represent Plymouth Argyle when he registered with the Football League in November 1945 to play as a guest for the club. He made three appearances, but the club failed to win any of these games. He played his last game for the club on 9 January 1946, before making one final guest appearance for Torquay United later in the same season.

== Death ==
Hodge died in Plymouth at the age of 90 in March 1996.

== Honours ==
Luton Town

- 1936–37 Football League Third Division South winner

Colchester United

- 1937–38 Southern League Cup winner
- 1937–38 Southern Football League Mid-Week section runner-up
- 1938–39 Southern Football League winner
- 1938–39 Southern Football League Mid-Week section runner-up

All honours referenced by:
