= Huish Park =

Football stadium in Somerset, England

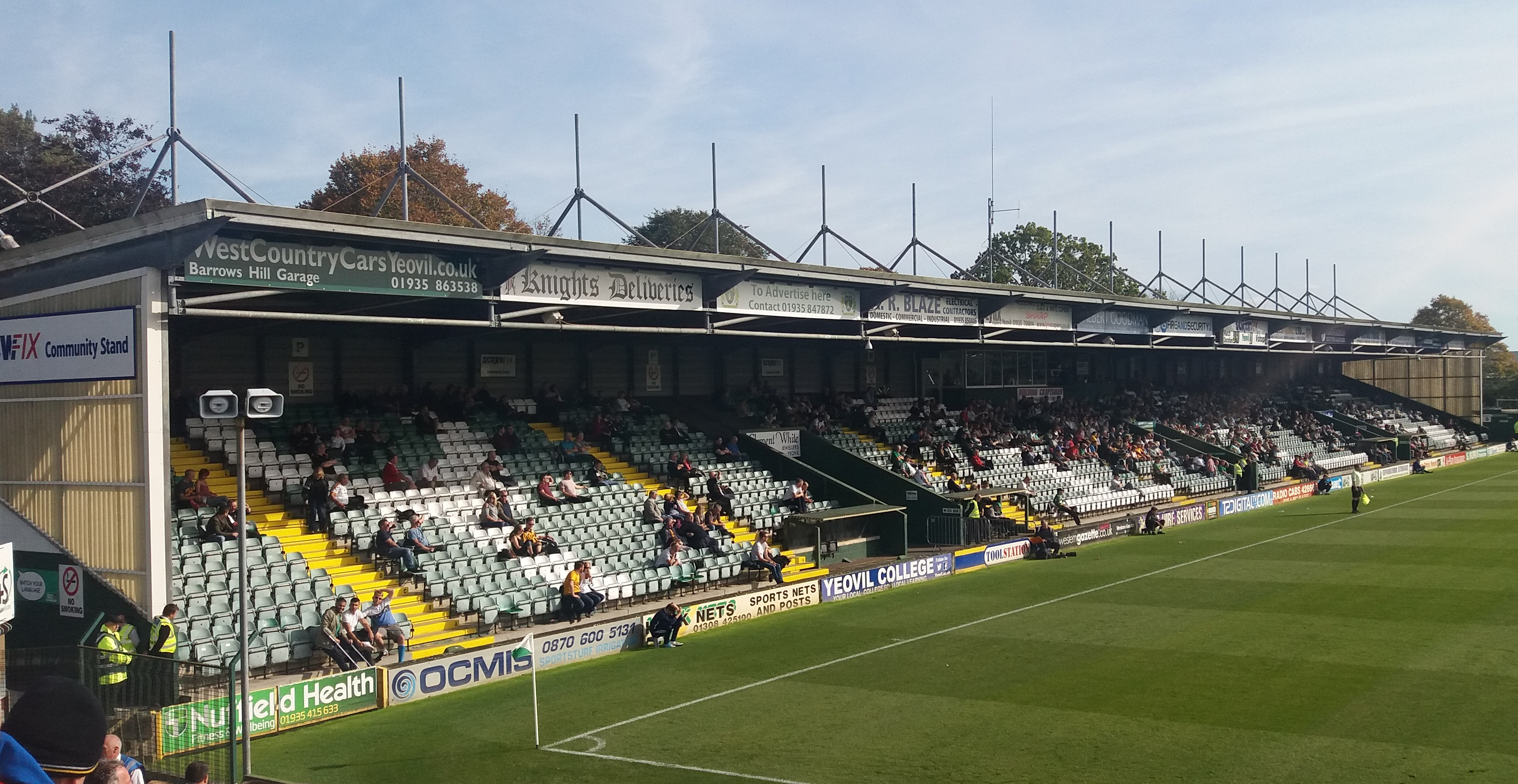
- The East Stand in 2017
- Interactive map of Huish Park
- Full name: Huish Park Stadium
- Location: Yeovil, Somerset, England
- Coordinates: 50°57′1″N 2°40′26″W
- Owner: Somerset Council
- Operator: Yeovil Town
- Capacity: 9,565 (5,212 seated)
- Surface: Grass
- Record attendance: 9,527 Yeovil Town vs. Leeds United
- Field size: 115 by 72 yards (105 m × 66 m)

Construction
- Built: 1989–1990
- Opened: 4 August 1990
- Cost: £3.5 million

Tenants
- Yeovil Town Football Club (1990–present); Yeovil Town Ladies Football Club (2016–2018)

Huish Park is a football stadium located in Yeovil, Somerset, England. The stadium has been home to Yeovil Town F.C. since its completion in 1990, following their relocation from Huish. Huish Park has a capacity of 9,565 (of which two stands are all-seated, totalling 5,212 seats) with terraces behind each of the goals.

== History ==
In January 1985, Yeovil started negotiations to sell the Huish Athletic Ground and move to a new stadium in the Houndstone area of Yeovil on the site of an old army camp. Negotiations commenced between the club and Bartlett Construction regarding moving from Huish to a new site at Houndstone Camp, with the first meeting taking place on 12 November 1985 when an offer of £1.3m was made for the Huish site. Following further meetings and more detailed plans being studied the offer was raised to over £2m early in 1986, when the directors agreed in principle for the move to go ahead. A company, Collier & Madge, who specialised in buying and selling supermarket sites was engaged to advise the club and to ensure the best possible price was obtained.

On 15 December 1986, the club was informed by its advisors, Collier and Madge, that the offer of £2.4m now on the table was about as much as they could hope to receive. It was revealed that the new proposed site for the club was 20.75 acres of freehold land at Houndstone Camp with a further 4.2 acres being made available on a 999-year lease. The directors agreed in principle to the deal and Tesco were insisting that contracts should be exchanged by the end of March 1987 with the building contractors having vacant possession by July 1988. Further discussions took place with South Somerset District Council regarding developing the new site for recreational use, and they set aside money to purchase the land.

At an extraordinary general meeting held on 25 August 1987, shareholders gave the go-ahead to "conclude negotiations with F. R. Bartlett Limited for the sale of Huish and to negotiate the development of the Houndstone site". The voting was 14,431 for and 1,356 against, giving a majority of 13,075, representing 91% in favour. On 15 September 1987, the Public Inquiry began which was to delay the proposed move for a long time; two days later the final agreement was signed.

On 21 March 1989, and after a wait of just over 20 months, the result of the Public Inquiry was made known. The Department of the Environment granted planning permission to develop Huish. The first work at the new ground got underway in May 1989 when boreholes were drilled. A month later it was revealed that the cost of the new development had risen to £3.5m and that Bartletts had come forward with a further £400,000, bringing the total for the sale of Huish to £2.8m. On Sunday 1 April 1990, over 500 supporters viewed the new stadium at Houndstone, and it was announced the new stadium would be called Huish Park.

The new Huish Park Stadium was opened with a friendly against Newcastle United on 4 August 1990, ending in a 2–1 defeat in front of a crowd of 5,093. The first competitive match followed on 18 August 1990 with a Football Conference match against Colchester United, the 2–0 win for Yeovil resulted in Mickey Spencer scoring Yeovil's first competitive goal at the new ground. The first season at the new ground resulted in an average attendance of 2,639, an increase of 17.6%, and the season finished with an U18 international match between England and Wales attracting a bumper 6,153 crowd.

The 1999–2000 season saw a proposal for the erection of a roof over the home terrace. The work eventually took place in early 2001, with the roof being completed for the match against Rushden & Diamonds, which drew a then-record crowd of 8,868.

Following Yeovil's promotion to the Football League, crowds increased by 30% to an average of 6,197 in the 2003–04 season, and on 25 April 2008, Yeovil's match against Leeds United saw the record attendance at the ground of 9,527.

In May 2022, South Somerset District Council completed the purchase of Huish Park and its surrounding land for £2.8 million from Yeovil Town Football Club, with the football club becoming tenants of the Council through a leaseback arrangement.

== Stands ==
The ground is made up of four stands:

- The Bamfords Main Stand (Main Stand), is a cantilevered covered single tiered stand that is all-seated. The stand has executive boxes running across its back and bar areas, the dug outs and players' tunnel and it houses the ticket office and club shop.
- The Screwfix Stand (East Stand), similar to the Main Stand in style with a Press Box beneath its roof.
- The Thatchers Gold Stand (Home Terrace), similar style covered cantilevered terrace for home fans.
- The Away Terrace (Away Terrace), smaller uncovered terrace with a large electric scoreboard behind.

== Attendances ==
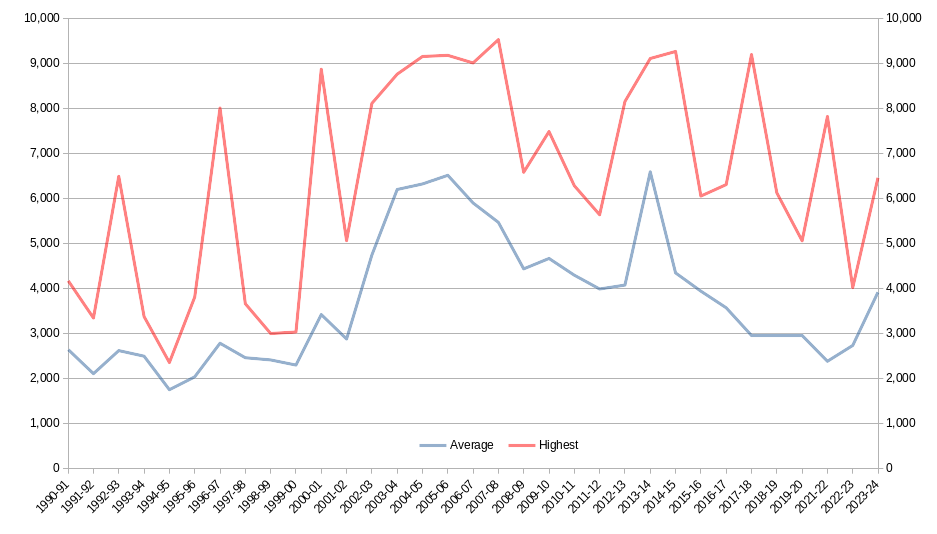
Average and highest attendances at the ground since it was opened in the 1990–91 season.

The five highest attendances at Huish Park are:

Date	Competition	Opposition	Attendance
25 April 2008	League One	Leeds United	9,527
4 January 2004	FA Cup	Liverpool	9,348
4 January 2015	FA Cup	Manchester United	9,264
26 January 2018	FA Cup	Manchester United	9,195
31 December 2005	League One	Bristol City	9,178

== International games ==
The stadium has been used for the following international games:

- 22 May 1991 England U18 Vs Wales U18 (3–0)
- 17 May 1992 England women Vs Iceland women (4–0)
- 16 November 1993 England U18 Vs France U18 (3–3)
- 23 April 1996 England U18 Vs Scotland U18 (3–0)
- 15 September 1999 England women Vs France women (0–1)
- 24 April 2002 England Semi-Pro Vs Netherlands Semi-Pro
- 27 March 2007 England U18 Vs Netherlands U18 (4–1)
- 15 October 2009 England U16 Vs Wales U16 (1–0)
- 25 March 2011 England Schools U16 Vs Wales Schools U16 (1–0)
- 20 November 2014 England U16 Vs Scotland U16 (2–1)

== Future development ==
In March 2011, Yeovil Town announced plans for a 3,500 seat stand to replace the current Away Terrace, in conjunction with the training pitches being redeveloped into retail land creating over 300 jobs in partnership with Chris Dawson, owner of the Range Home and Leisure. Following public consultation in late-November 2011 the plans for a new stand have dropped off the agenda with the retail development continuing as a new food store.

== Gallery ==
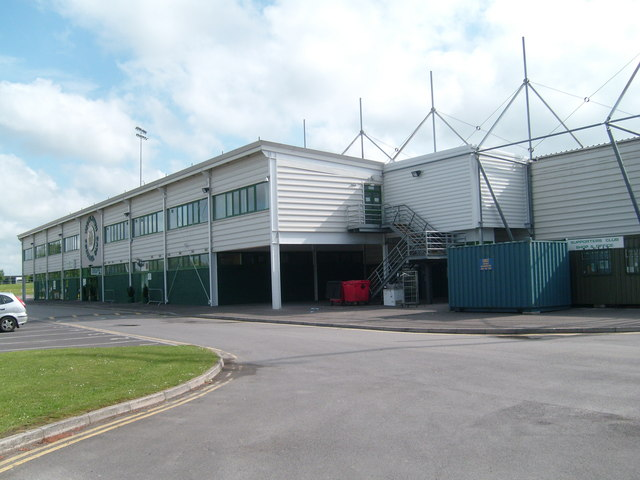
View looking towards the Main Stand

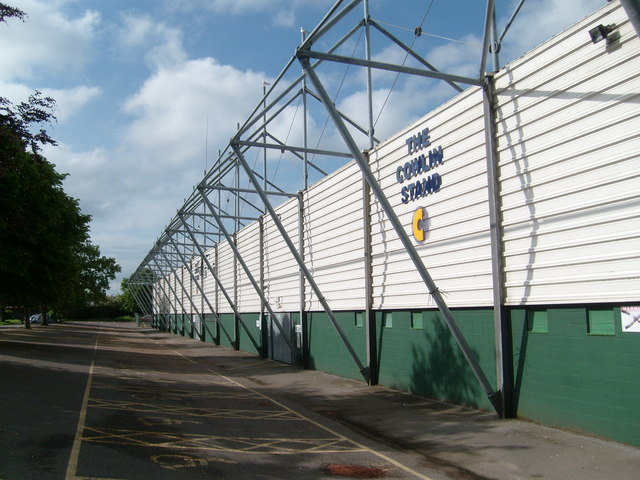
External view of the East Stand

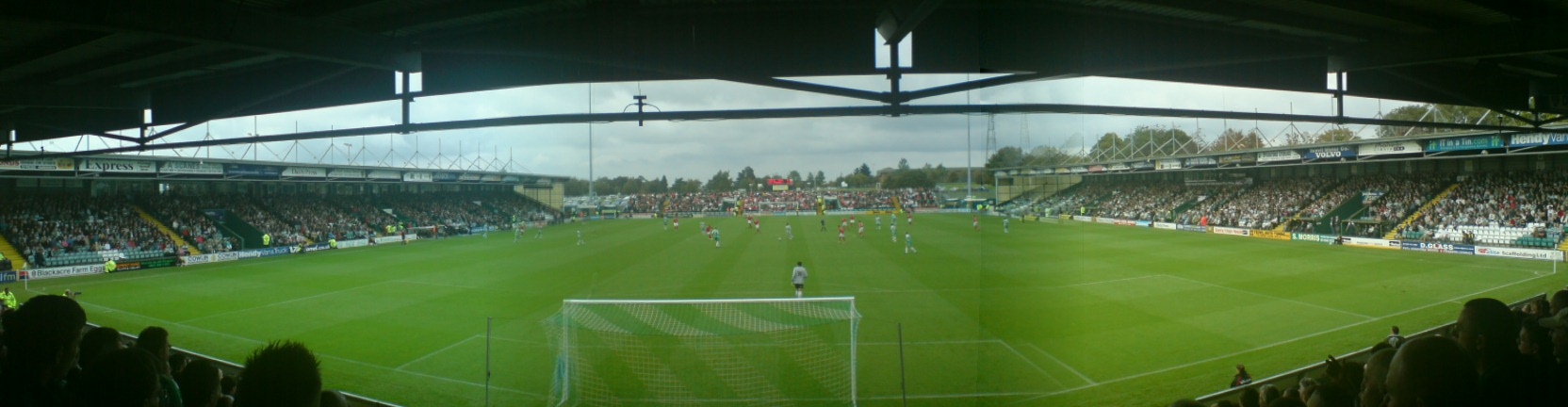
View across the pitch from the Home Terrace

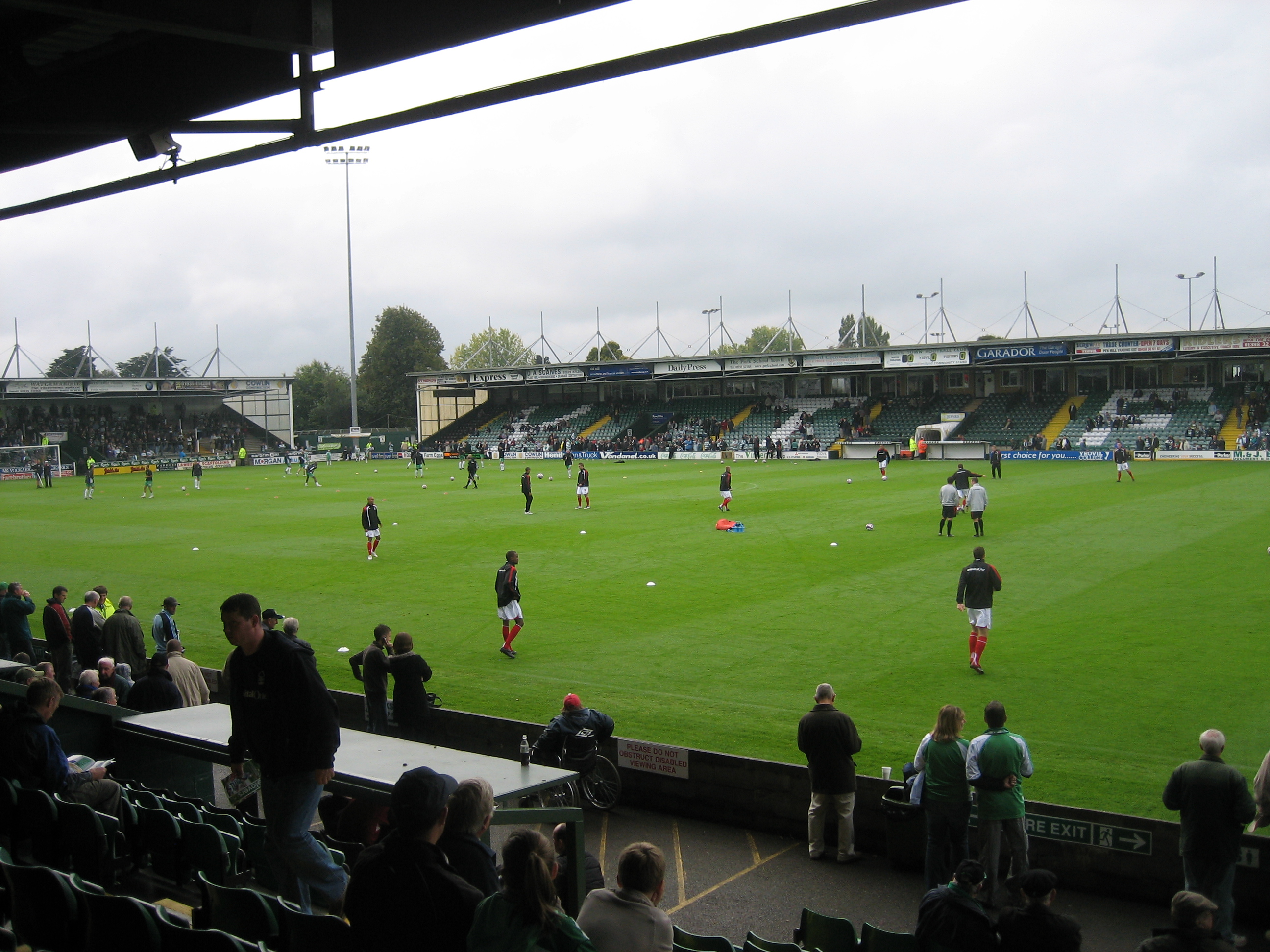
View across the pitch from the East Stand

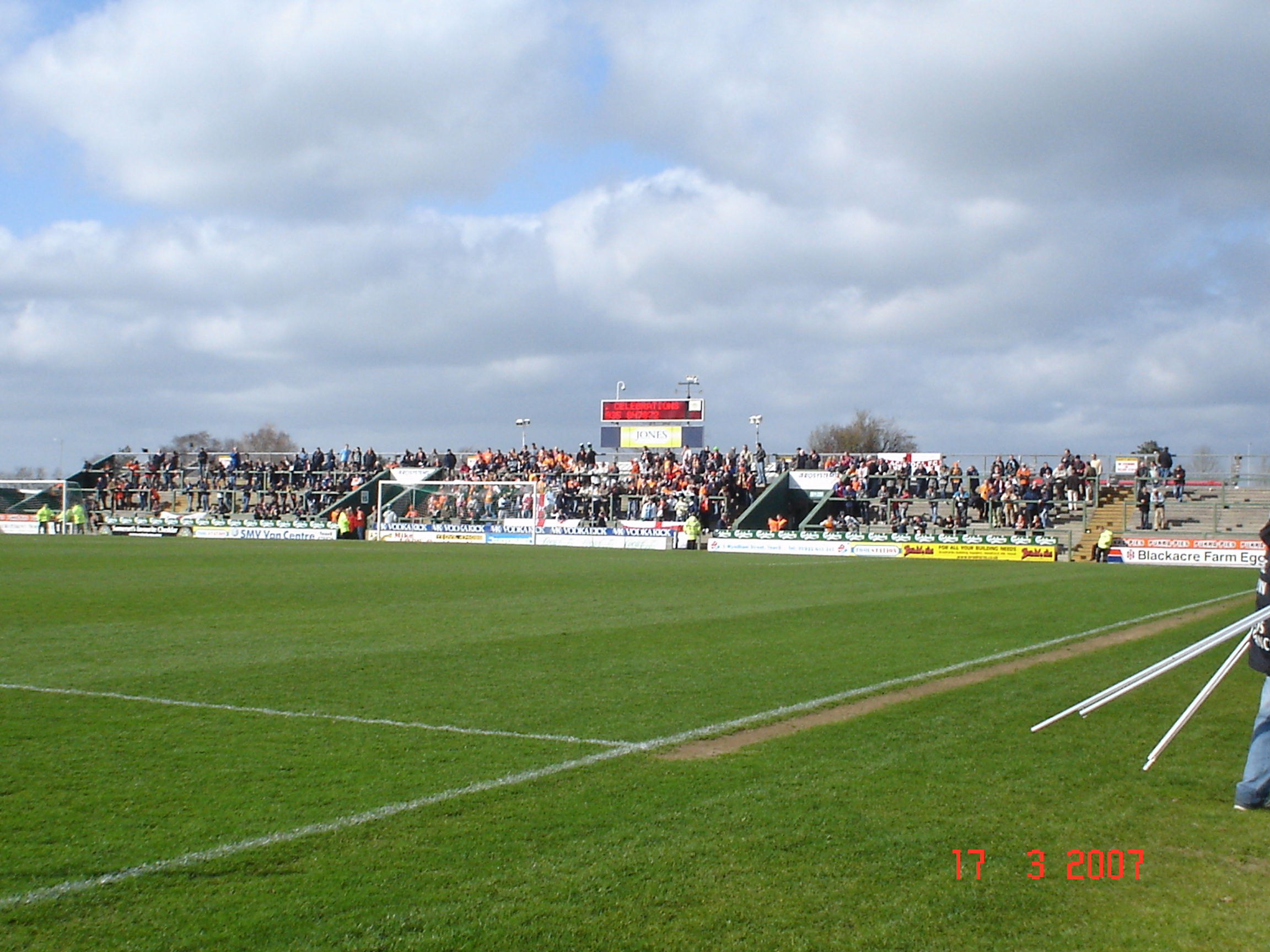
View of the Away Terrace

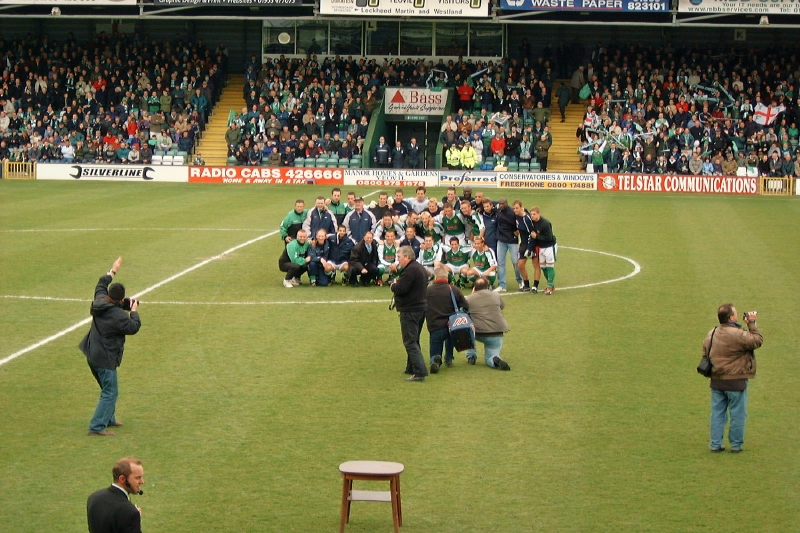
Yeovil celebrating their Football Conference triumph with East Stand in the background
