= Abram Smith =

Abram Smith may refer to:

- Abram Smith (American football) (born 1998), American football player
- Abram D. Smith (1811–1865), American lawyer and politician
- an African-American lynched in 1930 - see Lynching of Thomas Shipp and Abram Smith

== See also ==
- Abraham Smith (disambiguation)
