= Jack Connor (footballer, born 1911) =

Scottish footballer

Personal information
- Date of birth: 7 September 1911
- Place of birth: Glasgow, Scotland
- Date of death: 1994 (aged 82–83)
- Height: 5 ft 6 1/2 in (1.69 m)
- Position: Centre forward

Senior career*
Years	Team	Apps	(Gls)
19??–1932	St Roch's		
1932–1934	Celtic	4	(1)
1932–1933	→ Airdrie (loan)	21	(22)
1934–1936	Airdrie	70	(47)
1934–1935	→ Albion Rovers (loan)	6	(8)
1936–1938	Plymouth Argyle	42	(19)
1938–1939	Swansea Town	12	(1)
1939–1946	Queen of the South	?	(?)
1946	Alloa Athletic	6	(4)
1947	St Johnstone	5	(2)
Total		166	(104)

Managerial career
- St Roch's
- * Club domestic league appearances and goals

Jack Connor (7 September 1911 – 1994) was a Scottish footballer who played as a centre forward.

He began his career with St Roch's and joined Celtic in 1932. He was then loaned to Airdrie, where he scored 22 league goals. He joined the club permanently the following season after being unable to break into the first team at Celtic Park and continued to score regularly, including six goals in eight matches during a brief loan spell with Albion Rovers. He moved to England in 1936 to play for Plymouth Argyle. He scored 17 goals in his first season with the club, but lost his place in the team the following year after the arrival of Bill Hullett. He was transferred to Swansea Town and spent one season with the Welsh side before joining Queen of the South, where he played during the Second World War. He briefly played for Alloa Athletic and St Johnstone after the war before returning to St Roch's as their manager.
