= Tommy Dougan =

Scottish footballer (1915–1980)

Thomas Dougan (22 November 1915 – 1980) was a Scottish footballer. His regular position was as a forward. He was born in Holytown. He played for Alloa Athletic, Tunbridge Wells Rangers, Plymouth Argyle, Heart of Midlothian, and made four appearances for Manchester United.

Dougan died in Lochore in 1980, at the age of 64.
