= George Perrett =

English footballer

Personal information
- Full name: George Richard Perrett
- Date of birth: 2 May 1915
- Place of birth: Kennington, England
- Date of death: 8 September 1952 (aged 37)
- Position: Half back

Youth career
- Woking

Senior career*
Years	Team	Apps	(Gls)
1935–1936	Fulham	0	(0)
1936–1950	Ipswich Town	131	(4)
- * Club domestic league appearances and goals

George Richard Perrett (2 May 1915 – 8 September 1952) was an English professional footballer. He made over 100 appearances for Ipswich Town between 1936 and 1950. He was born in London.
