= Reg Smith (footballer, born 1916) =

English footballer

Personal information
- Full name: Reginald George Charles Smith
- Date of birth: 1916
- Place of birth: Westbury, Wiltshire, England
- Height: 5 ft 10 in (1.78 m)
- Position: Forward

Senior career*
Years	Team	Apps	(Gls)
- Westbury United
- Trowbridge Town
1935–1937	Bristol City	7	(1)
1937	Colchester United	8	(3)
1937–1938	Wolverhampton Wanderers	2	(0)
1938–1939	Tranmere Rovers	1	(0)
- Yeovil & Petters United
Total		18	(4)
- * Club domestic league appearances and goals

Reginald George Charles Smith (1916 – unknown) was an English footballer who played as a forward in the Football League for Bristol City, Wolverhampton Wanderers and Tranmere Rovers.

== Career ==
Born in Westbury, Wiltshire, Smith played for local sides Westbury United and Trowbridge Town before being signed by Football League club Bristol City for the 1935–36 season. He made seven league starts and scored once for City before becoming the first signing for newly formed Southern League club Colchester United.

Smith featured in Colchester's inaugural match on 28 August 1937 at Yeovil & Petters United, a game which the U's lost 3–0. He scored the club's first competitive goal and went on to record the club's first hat-trick in a 6–1 thrashing of Bath City at Layer Road in the following game on 2 September. He would record three goals in eight league appearances for Colchester, five goals in five Southern League mid-week section games and two goals in a single Southern League Cup match. His goalscoring ability was spotted by Wolverhampton Wanderers' manager Frank Buckley who signed him in October 1937 for £500, making Smith the first transfer out of Colchester.

With Wolves, Smith featured just twice before joining Tranmere Rovers. Here, he only managed one appearance before joining Yeovil & Petters United.

== Personal life ==
Smith not only played competitive football, but was a good enough tennis player that he entered Wimbledon on three occasions.
