= George Ritchie (footballer, born 1904) =

Scottish footballer (1904–1978)

Personal information
- Full name: George Thompson Ritchie
- Date of birth: 16 January 1904
- Place of birth: Glasgow, Scotland
- Date of death: 10 September 1978 (aged 74)
- Place of death: Leicester, England
- Height: 5 ft 6 in (1.68 m)
- Position: Wing half

Senior career*
| Years | Team | Apps | (Gls) |
- Maryhill
| 1922–1924 | Blackburn Rovers | 2 | (0) |
| 1924–1925 | Royal Albert | 19 | (10) |
| 1925–1928 | Falkirk | 80 | (3) |
| 1928–1937 | Leicester City | 247 | (12) |
| 1937–1939 | Colchester United | 20 | (1) |
| Total | | 368 | (26) |
- * Club domestic league appearances and goals

George Thompson Ritchie (16 January 1904 – 10 September 1978) was a Scottish footballer who played in the Football League as a wing half.

== Career ==
Born in Glasgow, Scotland, Ritchie played as a wing half for English clubs Blackburn Rovers, Leicester City and Colchester United and in Scotland for Royal Albert and Falkirk.

He was part of the Leicester side which finished runners-up in 1928-29, the club's highest-ever league finish (until 2016). He returned to Leicester's coaching staff under the management of former teammate Johnny Duncan between 1946 and 1949.

== Honours ==
Leicester City

- Football League Second Division: 1936–37

Colchester United

- Southern Football League Cup: 1937–38

Sporting positions
| Preceded by none | Colchester United captain 1937–1938 | Succeeded by George Leslie |
