= Jack Price (footballer, born 1918) =

English footballer

Personal information
- Full name: John Price
- Date of birth: 29 August 1918
- Place of birth: Horden, England
- Date of death: 18 April 2013 (aged 94)
- Place of death: Horden, England
- Position: Forward

Senior career*
Years	Team	Apps	(Gls)
1936–1937	Portsmouth	0	(0)
1937–1938	Wolverhampton Wanderers	0	(0)
1938–1948	Hartlepools United	90	(12)
1948–1949	York City	2	(2)
- * Club domestic league appearances and goals

John Price (29 August 1918 – 18 April 2013) was an English professional footballer born in Horden, County Durham, who played in the Football League in the 1930s for Hartlepools United and York City. He played as a forward.
