= Ray Wright =

English footballer

Personal information
- Full name: Horace Raymond Wright
- Date of birth: 6 September 1918
- Place of birth: Pontefract, England
- Date of death: August 1987 (aged 68)
- Place of death: Luton, England
- Position: Forward

Senior career*
Years	Team	Apps	(Gls)
1937–1939	Wolverhampton Wanderers	8	(1)
1946–1948	Exeter City	56	(11)
- Yeovil Town
- * Club domestic league appearances and goals

Horace Raymond Wright (6 September 1918 – August 1987) was an English professional footballer who played as an inside forward. He started his career with Wolverhampton Wanderers, making eight appearances before the outbreak of World War II. Wright joined Exeter City when competitive football resumed after the war and spent two seasons at the club before joining Yeovil Town.
