= Fred Hall (footballer, born 1917) =

English footballer

Personal information
- Full name: Frederick Wilkinson Hall
- Date of birth: 18 November 1917
- Place of birth: Chester-le-Street, England
- Date of death: 8 January 1989 (aged 71)
- Place of death: Stanley, County Durham, England
- Height: 5 ft 10 1/2 in (1.79 m)
- Position: Centre half

Youth career
- Ouston Juniors

Senior career*
Years	Team	Apps	(Gls)
1935–1946	Blackburn Rovers	29	(0)
1946–1955	Sunderland	215	(1)
1955–1956	Barrow	16	(1)
- * Club domestic league appearances and goals

Frederick Wilkinson Hall (18 November 1917 – 8 January 1989) was an English footballer who played for Sunderland as a defender.

== Club career ==
Hall arrived at Sunderland from Blackburn Rovers in 1946, and made his debut for the club on 31 August 1946 against Derby County in a 3–2 at Roker Park. Shortly after joining he was appointed as captain, as a central figure in the team. While playing for Sunderland during 1946 to 1954 he scored a single goal in 215 league appearances. After his Sunderland career, he joined Barrow in 1955 and went on to make 16 appearances with one goal in a single season, he then retired in 1956.
