= Ted Platt =

English footballer

Personal information
- Full name: Edward Hewitt Platt
- Date of birth: 26 March 1921
- Place of birth: Newcastle-under-Lyme, England
- Date of death: 20 September 1996 (aged 75)
- Place of death: Ilford, East London, England
- Height: 6 ft 1 in (1.85 m)
- Position: Goalkeeper

Youth career
- –1937: Bath City
- 1937–1939: Colchester United
- 1939–1946: Arsenal

Senior career*
Years	Team	Apps	(Gls)
1946–1953	Arsenal	53	(0)
1953–1955	Portsmouth	31	(0)
1955	Aldershot	16	(0)
1955–1957	Worcester City		
1957–1958	Ashford Town		
Total		100	(0)
- * Club domestic league appearances and goals

Edward Platt (26 March 1921 – 20 September 1996) was an English professional footballer. He played 100 games in the Football League as a goalkeeper for Arsenal, Portsmouth and Aldershot.

== Career ==
Platt, who had previously been with Bath City, joined Arsenal when 17 years of age in January 1939 from Southern League club Colchester United for whom he was a reserve goalkeeper and played in their Eastern Counties League team. He made his Arsenal first team debut in November 1946 and made a total of 53 appearances for the club in the Football League. Arsenal won England's top league, the First Division, in 1952-53 but, sharing goalkeeper duties with George Swindin and Jack Kelsey, Platt made only three league appearances in the championship winning team and left the club at the end of the season.

In July 1953 Platt joined Portsmouth, also of the First Division, where he remained for two seasons. After the 1954–55 season he was made available for transfer and subsequently signed with Aldershot. After playing in 16 of Aldershot's 18 initial Third Division South league matches of the 1955–56 season Platt was suspended by the club and at his own request was placed on the club's transfer list.

Within ten days, in November 1955, Platt joined Southern Football club Worcester City, staying with the club until the end of the following 1956–57 campaign. He signed with Ashford Town of the Kent League in the summer of 1957 and played with them for one season.
