= Abraham Smith (footballer) =

English footballer (1910–1974)

Personal information
- Date of birth: 17 December 1910
- Place of birth: Mansfield, England
- Date of death: 1974 (aged 63–64)
- Position: Half-back

Senior career*
Years	Team	Apps	(Gls)
–	Mansfield Town		
1931–1939	Portsmouth	78	(0)
- * Club domestic league appearances and goals

Abraham Smith (17 December 1910 – 1974) was an English professional footballer who played in The Football League for Portsmouth. He also played for Mansfield Town.
