= Huish Athletic Ground =

Football stadium in Somerset, England

Huish
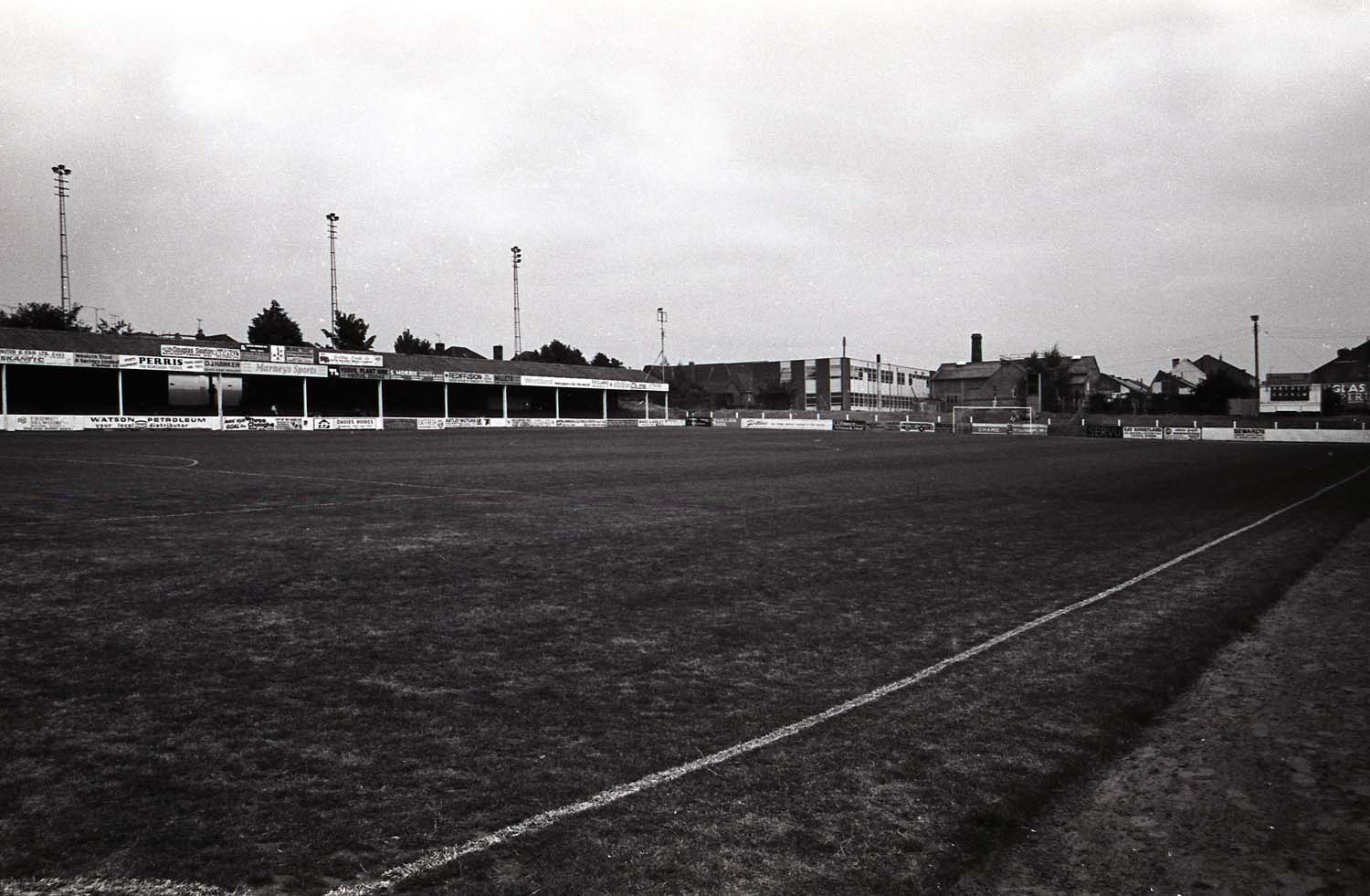
- Huish in 1983
- Interactive map of Huish
- Full name: Huish Athletic Ground
- Location: Yeovil, Somerset, England
- Coordinates: 50°56′32″N 2°38′13″W
- Owner: Yeovil Town F.C.
- Operator: Yeovil Town F.C.
- Capacity: 9,950 (at closure)
- Surface: Grass
- Record attendance: 17,123

Construction
- Opened: 28 August 1920
- Closed: 5 May 1990
- Demolished: 1990

Tenant
- Yeovil Town Football Club (1920–1990)

Huish Athletic Ground, more commonly referred to as Huish, was a football stadium located in Yeovil, Somerset, England. It was the second home ground of Yeovil Town Football Club, after the Pen Mill Athletic Ground which they left in 1920, until the club's departure for Huish Park in 1990.

The ground was most famous for having an 8-foot (2.4 m) side to side slope, and was the scene of one of the biggest FA Cup giant killings when Yeovil beat Sunderland in the fourth Round in 1949. The site is now occupied by the car park of a Tesco Extra hypermarket.

== History ==
=== Early years ===
The club had initially made an approach at the end of the 1897–98 season, for the Huish field then owned by Brutton's Brewery, but this approach was unsuccessful. Negotiations continued before the First World War for a move to this more central location in the town, with the club at the time playing at a ground adjacent to Pen Mill station. The summer of 1920 saw Yeovil & Petters United leave the Pen Mill Athletic Ground, after the purchase of the land at Huish from the brewery for £1,725; a covenant was placed on the deal that the brewery had first refusal to buy back the land at the original figure. The name for the ground was borrowed from the name of a suburb of the town, Huish, from the Old English hiwisc meaning a group of houses, or a household.

The new ground, at the west end of the town centre, saw its first competitive game on 28 August 1920 when the reserve team played Christchurch in the Dorset League: an attendance of 1,500 witnessed Yeovil & Petters United win 5–0. Initially the terraces were flat with the only covered accommodation in the form of a 300-seater stand that had been brought from Pen Mill; that stand was soon extended, to include dressing rooms costing £733 and additional capacity, and remained in place until 1963.

During the summer of 1923, tennis courts were marked out on the pitch and hired out at £2 per court for the summer season. Also that summer, 750 loads of earth were brought to the ground by Bartletts Ltd. to form a terrace at the Queen Street end of the ground and the pitch was lengthened by four yards (3.7 m) at a cost of £15. In October and November, a further 100 tons of materials were given by Westlands and hauled to the ground at a cost of £9 and the Club opened negotiations with the Southern Railway Company to purchase 1,000 railway sleepers, at a cost of £50, to add steps to the terraces. In 1924 the Supporters Club was formed and three tea huts were purchased and installed at Huish, and on 15 November 1924, Yeovil played their first game against a Football League team in the FA Cup, beating Bournemouth and Boscombe 3–2 at Huish before a crowd of 5,500. Before the next round home tie against Bristol Rovers, additional terracing was added at the Bruttons End and toilets were installed. In October 1926 the club acquired a lighting set on extended loan from Petters United, which enabled training to take place at night on the pitch and, a month later, the covered accommodation over the terraces at the Queen Street end was opened.

Greyhound racing took place around the pitch as early as 12 May 1928. The independent racing (unaffiliated to a governing body) was intermittent and organised by the Yeovil Football and Athletic Club Ltd. It is believed that the racing stopped before 1950 but was taking place in 1946.

In 1931 the club acquired the freehold of the land from Brutton's Brewery and purchased further land at the end of the ground to increase accommodation. A substantial amount of money was loaned to the club at a nominal rate of interest for the period that football was played at Huish to fund the purchase, and fans were asked to play their part in wiping off the balance. The next development of Huish came in the 1934–35 season when Yeovil reached the third round of the FA Cup for the first time and were drawn against Liverpool. In the two weeks between the time of the draw and the game being played, a small stand was built in the corner at the Queen Street end to hold 100 people at a cost of £250. The stand acted as the director's box and boardroom until the new main stand was built, and remained in place until 1983. At a board meeting on 7 February 1938, the first of many plans to level the pitch was discussed, but the practicality and the cost of such a scheme made this impossible. The ground's slope became infamous with the pitch sloped six feet (1.8 m) along the halfway line and eight feet (2.4 m) from corner to corner.

On 12 January 1939, during a FA Cup third round replay against Sheffield Wednesday the game saw a new record crowd of 14,329 pack into Huish with thousands more locked outside the ground. After the game got under way, the weight of the hordes of supporters who had climbed onto the roof of the Queen Street end caused the roof to split from one end to the other but the spectators were safely removed. That same month a loudspeaker system was purchased for £10 and in July the same year a quotation for £514 was received to build a retaining wall and to provide a concrete terrace at the Bruttons end; costs, however, stopped this project.

The last game at Huish before the ground was closed due to the Second World War was against Lovell's Athletic resulting in a 3–2 win for Yeovil on 27 January 1940. During the war Huish was, at first, used by the War Office as an ammunitions store and then by the United States Army, who offered to level the pitch if they could use the ground to play baseball, but their offer was not taken up.

=== Post-war expansion ===
Competitive football returned to Huish on 25 August 1945, when Swindon Town Reserves ran out 3–0 winners. The ground's most famous moment came on 29 January 1949, when Huish hosted Yeovil's greatest giant-killing as the then Southern League upset 'Bank of England' side Sunderland in the fourth round of the FA Cup. Over 35,000 applications for tickets were received but the ground could only hold half that number. A total of 17,123 spectators crammed into Huish, the largest attendance at the ground. The gates were opened at 12 noon, the main queue was six deep and over one-half mile (0.8 km) long. The final score Yeovil 2–1 Sunderland, shocked the whole football world, however, the game was almost stopped due to fog and a pitch invasion three minutes from time when the crowd thought that the referee had blown the final whistle. Five thousand jubilant fans invaded the pitch but they responded to the pleas from the players and moved back onto the terraces, and the game was concluded.

An extensive ground improvement scheme was then begun in 1949. Over the next five years the top bank of clinkers, earth and railway sleepers was removed and a concrete terrace was installed. This work continued at Bruttons End. The covering at the Queen Street end was removed and that terrace was then concreted. The final part of this project was to cover the North Terrace. The cost of these extensive works was in excess of £5,000, and to raise this money an appeal was made to the traders of the town and a special fund, known as the Ground Development Fund, was instituted. In 1954 a wall was built in front of the North Terrace and floodlights were installed at the ground. The first match under the lights was a friendly game against Tottenham Hotspur, on 8 March 1955: Yeovil won the match 2–0 before a crowd of 4,031. The first competitive game under the floodlights was against Bath City, on 23 March 1955. The final game of that season at Huish saw Yeovil draw 2–2 against Hastings United to win their first Southern League Championship. In 1956 further work on the North Terrace was completed when the back of the stand was closed in.

The next major development of Huish took place in the summer of 1963 when the new stand was built, as the original Pen Mill stand was demolished. Plans were drawn up by James E. Fox and in March 1963 work commenced when first a tea hut and then the stand was demolished. By the first week in May building work was under way, and at the start of the 1963–64 season the dressing rooms had been completed and the stand was open but the rest of the facilities were still under construction. The new 2,000 seater Main Stand was finally completed just in time for an FA Cup tie with Crystal Palace, on 7 December 1963, when the Social Club was opened. The new stand, which had cost £60,000 to build, gave the club new dressing rooms, an upstairs boardroom, and a long bar for supporters to drink in, where the club held dances and bingo nights. The bar soon became one of the hubs of the town, with the ground being on the west end of the town centre, and the additional income began to give the club payback for that investment.

In the late 1960s plans were drawn up for the Yeovil inner relief road, with one plan showing the road running right through the middle of the Huish pitch. When the road was eventually built only one very small area of land, at the Queen Street end, was lost. In July 1969 after months of negotiations the Deed of Covenant was released to the Club. In the summer of 1970 a Pop Festival was organised at Huish but the event was a flop and a loss of £470 was made. At the start of the seventies, scenes reminiscent of 1949 against Sunderland returned once again to Huish when Yeovil were drawn at home to Arsenal in the third round of the FA Cup. Admission charges were raised from 4s 6d to 15s for the terraces and from 6s 6d. to 30s for the stand. A wall was built in front of the main stand forming an enclosure to accommodate part of the crowd of 14,500. The big day did not arrive though, as on 2 January 1971 the game was postponed because there was a blanket of snow four inches deep on the pitch. The game was played the following Wednesday afternoon, Arsenal winning 3–0. At a Board meeting held in November 1972, the Directors once again discussed the possibility of levelling the Huish pitch; the cost would have been in the region of £17,000. The following month the club received an offer of £260,000 for the purchase of Huish.

The second half of the 1976–77 season saw European football come to Huish when Yeovil entertained Turris and then Bari in the Anglo Italian Semi Professional Tournament, with Yeovil travelling to Italy later that summer to play two further games in the tournament.

=== Departure and destruction ===
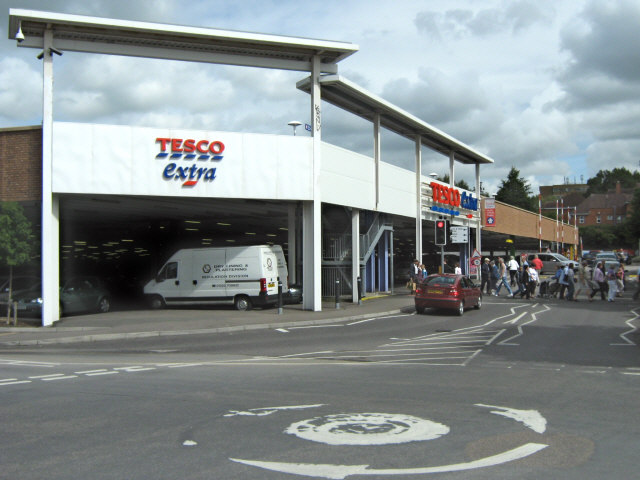
A Tesco Extra hypermarket is located on the site where Huish used to be.

The slope that the club had refused to level during the War was by the 1980s one of the barriers to promotion to the Football League. The last decade of the ground saw the club spend over £200,000 in the interest of crowd safety: the main stand underwent major surgery with the introduction of staircases and fire proofing while the terraces saw the introduction of crash barriers and segregation areas and, in the last season at Huish, the purchase of a closed circuit television system, at a cost of £15,000, to assist police in crowd surveillance. Furthermore, the Main stand was starting to develop rust in its supports that gave the club the dilemma of whether to pay the high maintenance costs of keeping Huish alive, or sell up and move to another site. Gradual safety restrictions had pulled the official ground capacity down to around 10,000 in its later years. The last capacity attendance came in January 1988, when Queens Park Rangers visited for an FA Cup third round match and 9,717 spectators watched a 0–3 defeat against the First Division side.

On 4 March 1985 the club opened negotiations with Bartlett Construction Limited with a view to selling Huish and moving to a new stadium at Houndstone. At that stage a value of £680,000 was placed upon Huish, which, over several years of negotiations rose to a final figure of £2.8m. Initially it was hoped that the building of a new stadium would commence in April 1986 but the results of a public inquiry which was held in September 1987 were not made known until February 1989. On 21 March 1989, the club finally got planning permission for an out-of-town stadium, on land previously used by the Houndstone Army Camp, and just over a year later, a home match against Telford United on 5 May 1990 marked the end of seventy years of football at Huish.

The bulldozers moved in and the site became part of a Tesco supermarket, while Yeovil Town moved out to Houndstone, with the old ground's name partially retained in its Huish Park moniker. For several years after, a weathercock on top of the Tesco building's clock tower showed a metal design with small figures of footballers; this is now located on top of the scoreboard above the Copse Road Terrace at Huish Park. Some items from Huish were transferred to other grounds, such as the turnstiles which ended up at Exmouth Town, but the majority of it ended up as rubble.

== See also ==
- List of defunct English football stadiums
