= Ted Davis (footballer) =

English footballer and manager

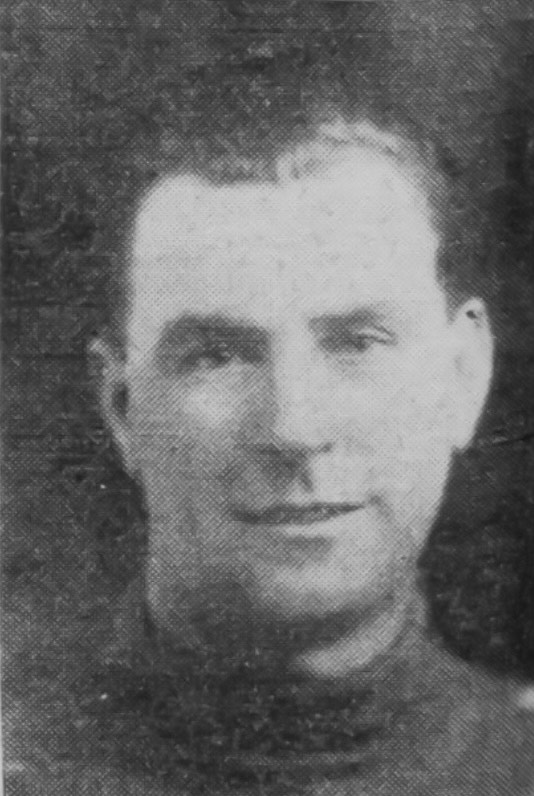

Personal information
- Full name: Edwin Davis
- Date of birth: 1892
- Place of birth: Bedminster, Bristol, England
- Date of death: 1954
- Height: 6 ft 0 in (1.83 m)
- Position: Goalkeeper

Senior career*
Years	Team	Apps	(Gls)
- Clapton Orient
1914–1922	Huddersfield Town	50	(0)
1922–1925	Blackburn Rovers	24	(0)

Managerial career
- 1927–1937: Bath City
- 1937–1939: Colchester United
- 1939–1947: Bath City
- * Club domestic league appearances and goals

Edwin Davis (1892–1954) was a professional footballer, who played for Clapton Orient, Huddersfield Town and Blackburn Rovers. He is Bath City's longest serving manager of all time.

== Management career ==
=== Bath City ===
Davis was appointed at Bath City in 1927. In 1929, he won the club their first competitive trophy, The Somerset Cup. The following season, the team finished first in the Southern League Western Section, though Bath lost 3–2 in the play offs to Eastern Section Champions Aldershot Town, hence, they were less applicable for election to the Third Division. The season was labelled "the best in the club's history by the Bath Chronicle." In 1933, the club won the Southern League Western Section for a second time, but lost in the final to play–off Eastern Section Champions Norwich City 2–1. In 1937, Davis left Bath for Colchester United.

Ted Davis rejoined Bath City in 1939, Upon the Outbreak of the Second World War, Bath were accepted to join the temporary Football League North, competing with the likes of Liverpool, Manchester United, Aston Villa and Everton, finishing the eventual champions under Davis, thereby becoming the only semi-professional side ever to win a Football League trophy. Though he then left the club in 1947. In total, Davis spent 17 years as Bath's first team coach, their longest serving manager.

== Managerial statistics ==
Team	From	To	Record				
Team	From	To	G	W	D	L	Won %
Colchester United	21 July 1937	30 September 1939	127	79	17	31	62.2
